= Contract =

Legally binding document establishing rights and duties between parties

A contract is an agreement that specifies certain legally enforceable rights and obligations pertaining to two or more parties. A contract typically involves consent to transfer of goods, services, money, or promise to transfer any of those at a future date. The activities and intentions of the parties entering into a contract may be referred to as contracting. In the event of a breach of contract, the injured party may seek judicial remedies such as damages or equitable remedies such as specific performance or rescission. A binding agreement between actors in international law is known as a treaty.

Contract law, the field of the law of obligations concerned with contracts, is based on the principle that agreements must be honoured. Like other areas of private law, contract law varies between jurisdictions. In general, contract law is exercised and governed either under common law jurisdictions, civil law jurisdictions, or mixed-law jurisdictions that combine elements of both common and civil law. Common law jurisdictions typically require contracts to include consideration in order to be valid, whereas civil and most mixed-law jurisdictions solely require a meeting of the minds between the parties.

Within the overarching category of civil law jurisdictions, there are several distinct varieties of contract law with their own distinct criteria: the German tradition is characterised by the unique doctrine of abstraction, systems based on the Napoleonic Code are characterised by their systematic distinction between different types of contracts, and Roman-Dutch law is largely based on the writings of renaissance-era Dutch jurists and case law applying general principles of Roman law prior to the Netherlands' adoption of the Napoleonic Code. The UNIDROIT Principles of International Commercial Contracts, published in 2016, aim to provide a general harmonised framework for international contracts, independent of the divergences between national laws, as well as a statement of common contractual principles for arbitrators and judges to apply where national laws are lacking. Notably, the Principles reject the doctrine of consideration, arguing that elimination of the doctrine "bring[s] about greater certainty and reduce litigation" in international trade. The Principles also rejected the abstraction principle on the grounds that it and similar doctrines are "not easily compatible with modern business perceptions and practice".

Contract law can be contrasted with tort law (also referred to in some jurisdictions as the law of delicts), the other major area of the law of obligations. While tort law generally deals with private duties and obligations that exist by operation of law, and provide remedies for civil wrongs committed between individuals not in a pre-existing legal relationship, contract law provides for the creation and enforcement of duties and obligations through a prior agreement between parties. The emergence of quasi-contracts, quasi-torts, and quasi-delicts renders the boundary between tort and contract law somewhat uncertain.

== Overview ==
A contract is a set of constructs created by distinct parties (Meeting of the minds) working to accomplish more than they could alone. Contracts are generally written and signed, and the legal enforceability of them secures some shelter of reliability. Contracts are widely used in commercial law, and for the most part form the legal foundation for transactions across the world. Common examples include contracts for the sale of services and goods, construction contracts, contracts of carriage, software licenses, employment contracts, insurance policies, sales or leases of land, among others. A contractual term is a "provision forming part of a contract". Each term gives rise to a contractual obligation, breach of which can give rise to litigation, although a contract may also state circumstances in which performance of an obligation may be excused. Not all terms are stated expressly, and terms carry different legal weight depending on how central they are to the objectives of the contract.

Contract duration may cover any period of time agreed by the parties. There are advantages to long term contracting, which fosters the development of trust, innovation, and better commercial relationships, but short term contracting also provides for flexibility and the ability to respond more readily to changing market conditions. A "term contract", also known as a "measured term contract", provides for the delivery of goods or services over a defined period of time. (Note: "Term", in this context, means period, not "contractual term.")

Contracting is a specific phase within procurement. It includes creating, negotiating, and managing contracts.

Obligations created by contracts can generally be transferred, subject to requirements imposed by law. Laws regarding the modification of contracts or the assignment of rights under a contract are broadly similar across jurisdictions. In most jurisdictions, a contract may be modified by a subsequent contract or agreement between the parties to modify the terms governing their obligations to each other. This is reflected in Article 3.1.2 of the Principles of International Commercial Contracts, which states that "a contract is concluded, modified or terminated by the mere agreement of the parties, without any further requirement". Assignments are typically subject to statutory restrictions, particularly with regard to the consent of the other party to the contract.

Contract theory is a large body of legal theory that addresses normative and conceptual questions in contract law. One of the most important questions asked in contract theory is why contracts are enforced. One prominent answer to this question focuses on the economic benefits of enforcing bargains. Another approach, associated with Charles Fried in his book Contract as Promise, maintains that the general purpose of contract law is to enforce promises. Other approaches to contract theory are found in the writings of legal realists and critical legal studies theorists, which have propounded Marxist and feminist interpretations of contract. Attempts at understanding the overarching purpose and nature of contracting as a phenomenon have been made, notably relational contract theory. Additionally, certain academic schools of thought, such as 'law and economics', focus on questions of transaction cost and 'efficient breach' theory.

Another important dimension of the theoretical debate in contract is its place within, and relationship to a wider law of obligations. Obligations have traditionally been divided into contracts, which are voluntarily undertaken and owed to a specific person or persons, and obligations in tort which are based on the wrongful infliction of harm to certain protected interests, primarily imposed by the law, and typically owed to a wider class of persons. Research in business and management has also paid attention to the influence of contracts on relationship development and performance.

Private international law is rooted in the principle that every jurisdiction has its own distinct contract law shaped by differences in public policy, judicial tradition, and the practices of local businesses. Consequently, while all systems of contract law serve the same overarching purpose of enabling the creation of legally enforceable obligations, they may contain significant differences. Accordingly, many contracts contain a choice of law clause and a forum selection clause to determine the jurisdiction whose system of contract law will govern the contract and the court or other forum in which disputes will be resolved, respectively. Failing express agreement on such matters in the contract itself, countries have rules to determine the law governing the contract and the jurisdiction for disputes. For example, European Union Member States apply Article 4 of the Rome I Regulation to decide the law governing the contract, and the Brussels I Regulation to decide jurisdiction.

== History ==
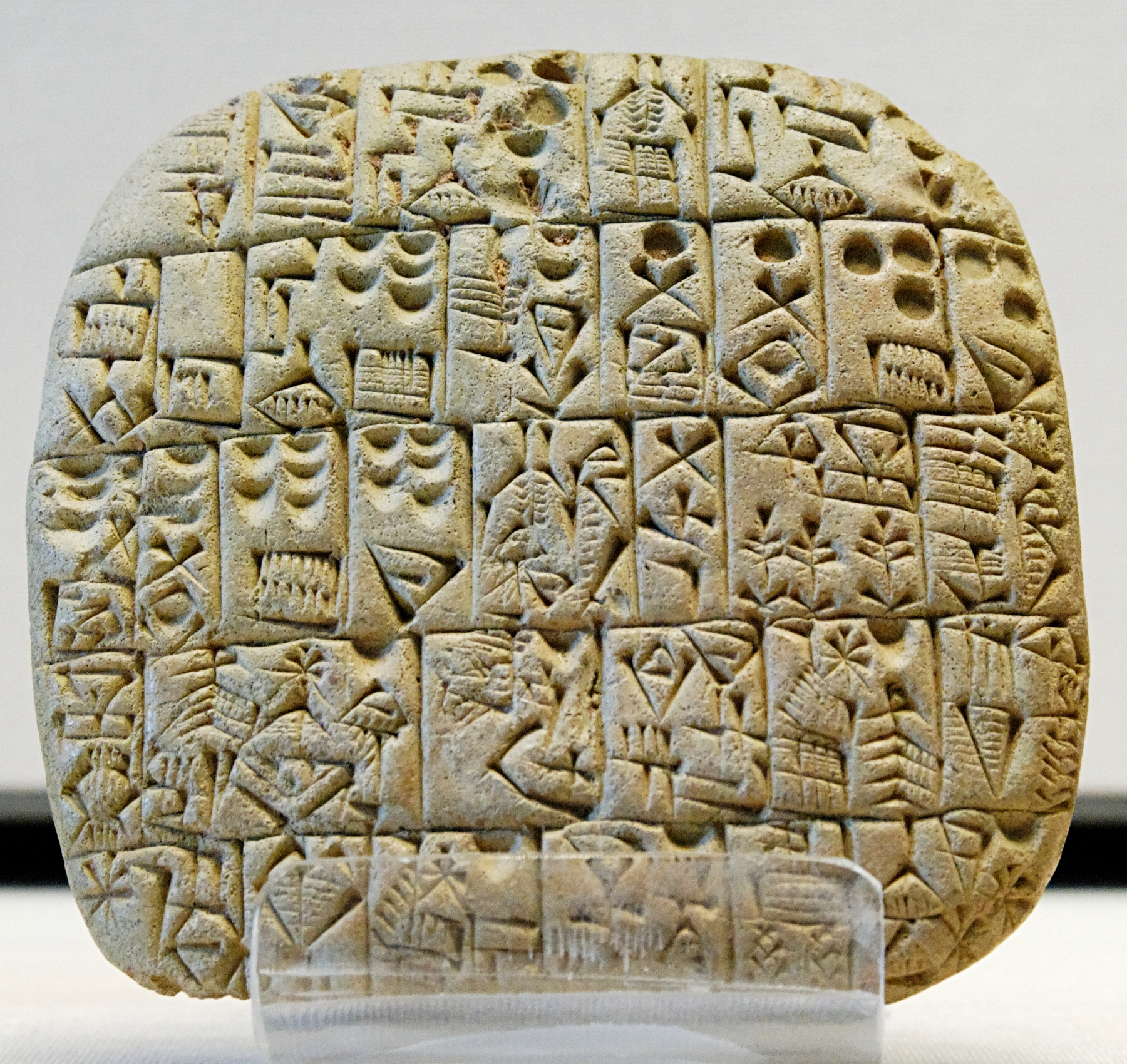
A Sumerian contract for the sale of a field and house in around 2600 BCE. As sedentary civilisations began to develop during the Bronze Age, contracts emerged as a necessary part of daily economic life.

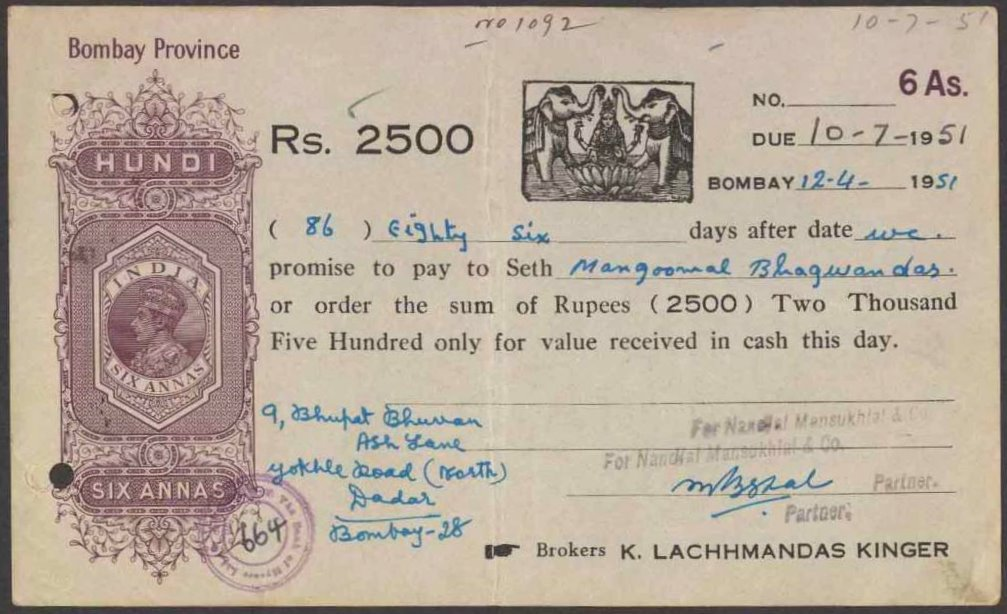
A hundi for Rs 2500 of 1951, stamped in the Bombay Province with a pre-printed revenue stamp. Hundis represent one of the earliest iterations of modern negotiable contracts.

Contracts have existed since antiquity, forming the basis of trade since the dawn of commerce and sedentism during the Neolithic Revolution. A notable early modern development in contract law was the emergence of the hawala system in the Indian subcontinent and the Arab world, under which a series of contractual relationships formed the basis of an informal value transfer system spanning the Silk Road. In the Indian subcontinent, the hawala system gave rise to the hundi, a transferrable contract entitling its holder in due course to obtain money from its issuer or an agent thereof, giving rise to the principle underlying contemporary negotiable instruments.

The hawala system also influenced the development of agency in common law and in civil laws. In Roman law, agents could not act on behalf of other individuals in the formation of binding contracts. On the other hand, Islamic law accepted agency as permissible in not only contract law but in the law of obligations generally, an approach that has since become mainstream in common law, mixed law, and most civil law jurisdictions. Analogously, the transfer of debt, which was not accepted under Roman law, became widely practiced in medieval European commerce, owing largely to trade with the Muslim world during the Middle Ages.

Since the nineteenth century, two distinct traditions of contract law emerged. Jurisdictions that were previously British colonies generally adopted English common law. Other jurisdictions largely adopted the civil law tradition, either inheriting a civil law legal system at independence or adopting civil and commercial codes based on German or French law. While jurisdictions such as Japan, South Korea, and the Republic of China modelled their contract law after the German pandectist tradition, the Arab world largely modelled its legal framework after the Napoleonic Code. While the Netherlands adopted a legal system based on the Napoleonic Code in the early 19th century, Dutch colonies retained the precedent-based Roman-Dutch law. British colonies in Southern Africa adopted Roman-Dutch principles in areas of private law via reception statutes adopting South African law, retaining Roman-Dutch law for most matters of private law while applying English common law principles in most matters of public law. Saint Lucia, Mauritius, Seychelles, and the Canadian province of Quebec are mixed-law jurisdictions which primarily adhere to French legal tradition with regard to contract law and other principles of private law.

Over the course of the nineteenth and twentieth century, the majority of jurisdictions in the Middle East and East Asia adopted civil law legal frameworks based on the Napoleonic, German, or Swiss model. The Napoleonic Code shapes contract law across much of the Middle East, while contract law in Japan, South Korea, and the Republic of China is rooted in the German pandectist tradition. In 1926, Turkey replaced its Ottoman-era mixture of Islamic and secular laws with a secular civil code modelled after that of Switzerland, with its contract and commercial law modelled after the Swiss Code of Obligations, which was in turn influenced by German and French legal traditions. Following the Meiji Restoration, Japan adopted a series of legal codes modelled primarily on German law, adopting its commercial code in 1899. The Japanese adaptation of German civil law was spread to the Korean Peninsula and China as a result of Japanese occupation and influence, and continues to form the basis of the legal system in South Korea and the Republic of China. In 1949, Abd El-Razzak El-Sanhuri and Edouard Lambert drafted the Egyptian Civil Code, modelled after the Napoleonic Code but containing provisions designed to fit Arab and Islamic society. (Note: For instance, Article 1 of the code provides that, "in the absence of any applicable legislation, the judge shall decide according to the custom and failing the custom, according to the principles of Islamic Law".) The Egyptian Civil Code was subsequently used as a model for the majority of Arab states.

In the 20th century, the growth of export trade led to countries adopting international conventions, such as the Hague-Visby Rules and the UN Convention on Contracts for the International Sale of Goods, bringing the various legal traditions closer together. In the early 20th century, the United States underwent the "Lochner era", in which the Supreme Court of the United States struck down economic regulations on the basis of freedom of contract and the Due Process Clause. These decisions were eventually overturned, and the Supreme Court established a deference to legislative statutes and regulations that restrict freedom of contract. The need to prevent discrimination and unfair business practices has placed additional restrictions on the freedom of contract. For example, the Civil Rights Act of 1964 restricted private racial discrimination against African-Americans. The US Constitution contains a Contract Clause, but this has been interpreted as only restricting the retroactive impairment of contracts. In the late twentieth and early twenty-first century, consumer protection legislation, such as Singapore's Consumer Protection (Fair Trading) Act 2003, progressively imposed limits upon the freedom of contract in order to prevent businesses from exploiting consumers.

In 1993, Harvey McGregor, a British barrister and academic, produced a "Contract Code" under the auspices of the English and Scottish Law Commissions, which was a proposal to both unify and codify the contract laws of England and Scotland. This document was offered as a possible "Contract Code for Europe", but tensions between English and German jurists meant that this proposal has so far come to naught. In spite of the European Union being an economic community with a range of trade rules, there continues to be no overarching "EU Law of Contract".

In 2021, mainland China adopted the Civil Code of the People's Republic of China, which codifies its contract law in book three. While generally classified as a civil law jurisdiction, contract law in mainland China has been influenced by a number of sources, including traditional Chinese views toward the role of law, the PRC's socialist background, the Japanese/German-based law of the Republic of China on Taiwan, and the English-based common law used in Hong Kong. Consequently, contract law in the mainland China functions as a de facto mixed system. The 2021 civil code provides for the regulation of nominate contracts in a manner similar to that of jurisdictions such as Japan, Germany, France, and Québec.

== Common law contracts ==
The rules governing contracts vary between jurisdictions. In the majority of English-speaking countries, the rules are derived from English contract law which emerged as a result of precedents established by various courts in England over the centuries. Meanwhile, civil law jurisdictions generally derive their contract law from Roman law, although there are differences between German contract law, legal systems inspired by the Napoleonic Code or the Civil Code of Lower Canada (e.g. Québec and Saint Lucia), and jurisdictions following Roman-Dutch law (e.g. Indonesia and Suriname) or a mixture of Roman-Dutch law and English common law (e.g. South Africa and neighbouring countries).

=== Formation ===
In common law jurisdictions, the formation of a contract generally requires an offer, acceptance, consideration, and mutual intent to be bound. The concept of contract law as a distinct area of law in common law jurisdictions originated with the now-defunct writ of assumpsit, which was originally a tort action based on reliance. Although verbal contracts are generally binding in most common law jurisdictions, some types of contracts may require formalities such as being in writing or by deed.

A contract cannot be formed without assent of the two parties to be bound by its terms. Normally this is by written signature (which may include an electronic signature), but the assent may also be oral or by conduct. Assent may be given by an agent for a party.

Remedies for breach of contract include damages (monetary compensation for loss) and, for serious breaches only, cancellation. Specific performance and injunction may also be available if damages are insufficient.

==== Offer, acceptance, and invitation to treat ====
In order for a legally enforceable contract to be formed, the parties must reach mutual assent (also called a meeting of the minds). This is typically reached through an offer and an acceptance which does not vary the offer's terms, which is known as the "mirror image rule". An offer is defined as a promise that is dependent on a certain act, promise, or forbearance given in exchange for the initial promise. An acceptance is simply the assent of the other contracting party or parties to the terms stipulated in the contract. As an offer states the offeror's willingness to be bound to the terms proposed therein, a purported acceptance that varies the terms of an offer is not an acceptance but a counteroffer and hence a rejection of the original offer. The principle of offer and acceptance has been codified under the Indian Contract Act, 1872.

In determining if a meeting of the minds has occurred, the intention of contracting parties is interpreted objectively from the perspective of a reasonable person. The "objective" approach towards contractual intent was first used in the English case of Smith v Hughes in 1871. Where an offer specifies a particular mode of acceptance, only acceptance communicated via that method will be valid.

Contracts may be bilateral or unilateral. A bilateral contract is an agreement in which each of the parties to the contract makes a promise or set of promises to each other. For example, in a contract for the sale of a home, the buyer promises to pay the seller $200,000 in exchange for the seller's promise to deliver title to the property. Bilateral contracts commonly take place in the daily flow of commercial transactions. Less common are unilateral contracts, in which one party makes a promise, but the other side does not promise anything. In these cases, those accepting the offer are not required to communicate their acceptance to the offeror. In a reward contract, for example, a person who has lost a dog could promise a reward if the dog is found, through publication or orally. The payment could be additionally conditioned on the dog being returned alive. Those who learn of the reward are not required to search for the dog, but if someone finds the dog and delivers it, the promisor is required to pay. On the other hand, advertisements which promise bargains are generally regarded not as offers for unilateral contracts but merely "invitations to treat". Some have criticised the categorisation of contracts into bilateral and unilateral ones. For example, the High Court of Australia stated that the term unilateral contract is "unscientific and misleading".

In certain circumstances, an implied contract may be created. A contract is implied in fact if the circumstances imply that parties have reached an agreement even though they have not done so expressly. For example, if a patient refuses to pay after being examined by a doctor, the patient has breached a contract implied in fact. A contract which is implied in law is sometimes called a quasi-contract. Such contracts are means for courts to remedy situations in which one party would be unjustly enriched were he or she not required to compensate the other. Quantum meruit claims are an example.

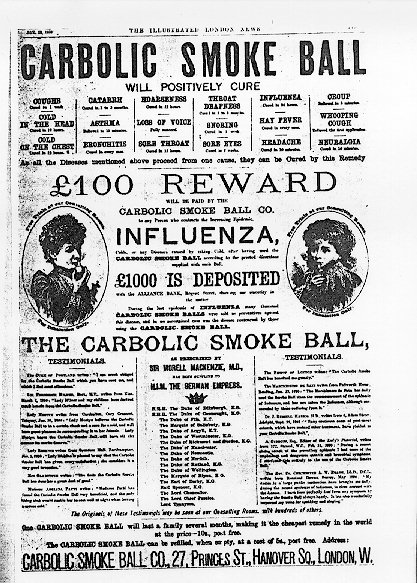
The Carbolic Smoke Ball offer

Where something is advertised in a newspaper or on a poster, the advertisement will not normally constitute an offer but will instead be an invitation to treat, an indication that one or both parties are prepared to negotiate a deal. An exception arises if the advertisement makes a unilateral promise, such as the offer of a reward, as in the case of Carlill v Carbolic Smoke Ball Co, decided in nineteenth-century England. The company, a pharmaceutical manufacturer, advertised a smoke ball that would, if sniffed "three times daily for two weeks", prevent users from catching the flu. If it failed to do so, the company promised to pay the user £100, adding that they had "deposited £1,000 in the Alliance Bank to show [their] sincerity in the matter". When the company was sued for the money, they argued the advert should not have been taken as a serious, legally binding offer but a puff. The Court of Appeal held that it would appear to a reasonable man that Carbolic had made a serious offer and determined that the reward was a contractual promise.

As decided in the case of Pharmaceutical Society of Great Britain v Boots Cash Chemists, an offer that is made in response to an invitation to treat, without any negotiation or explicit modification of terms, is presumed to incorporate the terms of the invitation to treat.

==== Consideration ====
In contract law, consideration refers to something of value which is given in exchange for the fulfilment of a promise. In Dunlop v. Selfridge, Lord Dunedin described consideration "the price for which the promise of the other is bought". Consideration can take multiple forms and includes both benefits to the promisor and detriments to the promisee. Forbearance to act, for example, can constitute valid consideration, but only if a legal right is surrendered in the process. Common law jurisdictions require consideration for a simple contract to be binding, but allow contracts by deed to not require consideration. Similarly, under the Uniform Commercial Code, firm offers in most American jurisdictions are valid without consideration if signed by the offeror.

===== Rules applicable to consideration =====
Consideration must be lawful for a contract to be binding. Applicable rules in determining if consideration is lawful exist both in case law and in the codes of some common law jurisdictions. The general principles of valid consideration in the common law tradition are that:

1. Consideration must be requested for.
2. Consideration must come from the promisee.
3. Consideration cannot have already occurred. It must be performed either at or after the formation of contract.
4. Consideration cannot be a pre-existing legal or contractual obligation.
5. Consideration need not be of the same value as the other party's promise. For example, a peppercorn in contract law describes a very small and inadequate consideration.
6. Consideration must be legal i.e., not prohibited by the law.

The insufficiency of past consideration is related to the pre-existing duty rule. For example, in the early English case of Eastwood v. Kenyon [1840], the guardian of a young girl took out a loan to educate her. After she was married, her husband promised to pay the debt but the loan was determined to be past consideration. In the early English case of Stilk v. Myrick [1809], a captain promised to divide the wages of two deserters among the remaining crew if they agreed to sail home short-handed; however, this promise was found unenforceable as the crew were already contracted to sail the ship. The pre-existing duty rule also extends to general legal duties; for example, a promise to refrain from committing a tort or crime is not sufficient.

Some jurisdictions have modified the English principle or adopted new ones. For example, in the Indian Contract Act, 1872, past consideration constitutes valid consideration, and that consideration may be from any person even if not the promisee. The Indian Contract Act also codifies examples of when consideration is invalid, for example when it involves marriage or the provision of a public office.

===== Criticism =====
The primary criticism of the doctrine of consideration is that it is purely a formality that merely serves to complicate commerce and create legal uncertainty by opening up otherwise simple contracts to scrutiny as to whether the consideration purportedly tendered satisfies the requirements of the law.

While the purpose of the doctrine was ostensibly to protect parties seeking to void oppressive contracts, this is currently accomplished through the use of a sophisticated variety of defences available to the party seeking to void a contract. In practice, the doctrine of consideration has resulted in a phenomenon similar to that of Ḥiyal in Islamic contracts, whereby parties to a contract use technicalities to satisfy requirements while in fact circumventing them in practice. Typically, this is in the form of "peppercorn" consideration, i.e. consideration that is negligible but still satisfies the requirements of law. (Note: For instance, agreeing to sell a car for a penny may constitute a binding contract.)

The doctrine of consideration has been expressly rejected by the UNIDROIT Principles of International Commercial Contracts on the grounds that it yields uncertainty and unnecessary litigation, thereby hindering international trade. Similarly, the United Nations Convention on Contracts for the International Sale of Goods does not require consideration for a contract to be valid, thereby excluding the doctrine with regard to contracts covered by the convention even in common law jurisdictions where it would otherwise apply. The continued existence of the doctrine in common law jurisdictions is controversial. Scots lawyer Harvey McGregor's "Contract Code", a Law Commission-sponsored proposal to both unite and codify English and Scots Law, proposed the abolition of consideration. Some commentators have suggested for consideration to be replaced by estoppel as a basis for contracts.

==== Written and oral contracts ====
A contract is often evidenced in writing or by deed. The general rule is that a person who signs a contractual document will be bound by the terms in that document. This rule is referred to as the rule in L'Estrange v Graucob or the "signature rule". This rule was approved by the High Court of Australia in Toll (FGCT) Pty Ltd v Alphapharm Pty Ltd. The rule typically binds a signatory to a contract regardless of whether they have actually read it, provided the document is contractual in nature. However, defences such as duress or unconscionability may enable the signer to avoid the obligation. Further, reasonable notice of a contract's terms must be given to the other party prior to their entry into the contract.

Written contracts have typically been preferred in common law legal systems. In 1677 England passed the Statute of Frauds which influenced similar statute of frauds laws in the United States and other countries such as Australia. (Note: In Australia, the Sales and Storage of Goods Act applies.) In general, the Uniform Commercial Code as adopted in the United States requires a written contract for tangible product sales in excess of $500, and for real estate contracts to be written. If the contract is not required by law to be written, an oral contract is generally valid and legally binding. The United Kingdom has since replaced the original Statute of Frauds, but written contracts are still required for various circumstances such as land (through the Law of Property Act 1925).

Apart from using a written document, a valid contract may generally be made orally or even by conduct. (Note: For instance, bidding in auctions, or acting in response to a unilateral offer.) An oral contract may also be called a parol contract or a verbal contract, with "verbal" meaning "spoken" rather than "in words", an established usage in British English with regards to contracts and agreements, and common although somewhat deprecated as "loose" in American English. An unwritten, unspoken contract, also known as "a contract implied by the acts of the parties", which can be legally implied either from the facts or as required in law. Implied-in-fact contracts are real contracts under which parties receive the "benefit of the bargain". However, contracts implied in law are also known as quasi-contracts, and the remedy is quantum meruit, the fair market value of goods or services rendered.

==== Certainty, completeness, and intention of parties ====
In commercial agreements it is presumed that parties intend to be legally bound unless the parties expressly state the opposite. For example, in Rose & Frank Co v JR Crompton & Bros Ltd, an agreement between two business parties was not enforced because an "honour clause" in the document stated "this is not a commercial or legal agreement, but is only a statement of the intention of the parties". In contrast, domestic and social agreements such as those between children and parents are typically unenforceable on the basis of public policy. For example, in the English case Balfour v. Balfour a husband agreed to give his wife £30 a month while he was away from home, but the court refused to enforce the agreement when the husband stopped paying. In contrast, in Merritt v Merritt the court enforced an agreement between an estranged couple because the circumstances suggested their agreement was intended to have legal consequences.

If the terms of a contract are so uncertain or incomplete as to elude reasonable interpretation, the parties cannot have reached an agreement in the eyes of the law. An agreement to agree does not constitute a contract, and an inability to agree on key issues, which may include such things as price or safety, may cause an entire contract to fail. However, a court will attempt to give effect to commercial contracts where possible, by construing a reasonable construction of the contract. In New South Wales, even if there is uncertainty or incompleteness in a contract, the contract may still be binding on the parties if there is a sufficiently certain and complete clause requiring the parties to undergo arbitration, negotiation or mediation.

Courts may also look to external standards, which are either mentioned explicitly in the contract or implied by common practice in a certain field. In addition, the court may also imply a term; if price is excluded, the court may imply a reasonable price, with the exception of land, and second-hand goods, which are unique.

If there are uncertain or incomplete clauses in the contract, and all options in resolving its true meaning have failed, it may be possible to sever and void just those affected clauses if the contract includes a severability clause. The test of whether a clause is severable is an objective test—whether a reasonable person would see the contract standing even without the clauses. Typically, non-severable contracts only require the substantial performance of a promise rather than the whole or complete performance of a promise to warrant payment. However, express clauses may be included in a non-severable contract to explicitly require the full performance of an obligation.

English courts have established that any intention to make the contract a "complete code", so as to exclude any option to resort to a common law or extra-contractual remedy, must be evidenced in "clear express words": otherwise a "presumption that each party to a contract is entitled to all remedies which arise by operation of law" will be honoured by the courts.

==== Conditions, warranties, and representations ====
Common law jurisdictions typically distinguish three different categories of contractual terms, conditions, warranties and intermediate terms, which vary in the extent of their enforceability as part of a contract. English common law distinguishes between important conditions and warranties, with a breach of a condition by one party allowing the other to repudiate and be discharged while a warranty allows for remedies and damages but not complete discharge. In modern United States law the distinction is less clear but warranties may be enforced more strictly. Whether or not a term is a condition is determined in part by the parties' intent.

In a less technical sense, however, a condition is a generic term and a warranty is a promise. In specific circumstances these terms are used differently. For example, in English insurance law, violation of a "condition precedent" by an insured is a complete defence against the payment of claims. In general insurance law, a warranty is a promise that must be complied with. In product transactions, warranties promise that the product will continue to function for a certain period of time. In the United Kingdom, the courts determine whether a term is a condition or warranty, regardless of how or whether the term was classified in the contract. Statute may also declare a term or nature of term to be a condition or warranty. For example, the Sale of Goods Act 1979 s15A provides that terms as to title, description, quality and sample are generally conditions. The United Kingdom has also developed the concept of an "intermediate term" (also called innominate terms), first established in Hong Kong Fir Shipping Co Ltd v Kawasaki Kisen Kaisha Ltd [1962].

Traditionally, while warranties are contractual promises which are enforced through legal action, regardless of materiality, intent, or reliance, representations are traditionally precontractual statements that allow for a tort-based action (such as the tort of deceit) if the misrepresentation is negligent or fraudulent. In U.S. law, the distinction between the two is somewhat unclear. Warranties are generally viewed as primarily contract-based legal action, while negligent or fraudulent misrepresentations are tort-based, but there is a confusing mix of case law in the United States. In modern English law, sellers often avoid using the term "represents" in order to avoid claims under the Misrepresentation Act 1967, while in America the use of "warrants and represents" is relatively common.

English courts may weigh parties' emphasis in determining whether a non-contractual statement is enforceable as part of the contract. In the English case of Bannerman v White, the court upheld a rejection by a buyer of hops which had been treated with sulphur since the buyer explicitly expressed the importance of this requirement. The relative knowledge of the parties may also be a factor, as in English case of Bissett v Wilkinson, where the court did not find misrepresentation when a seller said that farmland being sold would carry 2000 sheep if worked by one team; the buyer was considered sufficiently knowledgeable to accept or reject the seller's opinion.

According to Andrew Tettenborn et al., there are five differing circumstances under which a contractual term will become a condition:

A term is a condition (rather than an intermediate or innominate term, or a warranty), in any of the following five situations: (1) statute explicitly classifies the term in this way; (2) there is a binding judicial decision supporting this classification of a particular term as a "condition"; (3) a term is described in the contract as a "condition" and upon construction it has that technical meaning; (4) the parties have explicitly agreed that breach of that term, no matter what the factual consequences, will entitle the innocent party to terminate the contract for breach; or (5) as a matter of general construction of the contract, the clause must be understood as intended to operate as a condition.

==== Capacity ====
In all systems of contract law, the capacity of a variety of natural or juristic persons to enter into contracts, enforce contractual obligations, or have contracts enforced against them is restricted on public policy grounds. Consequently, the validity and enforceability of a contract depends not only on whether a jurisdiction is a common, civil, or mixed law jurisdiction but also on the jurisdiction's particular policies regarding capacity. For instance, very small children may not be held to bargains they have made, on the assumption that they lack the maturity to understand what they are doing; errant employees or directors may be prevented from contracting for their company, because they have acted ultra vires (beyond their power). Another example might be people who are mentally incapacitated, either by disability or drunkenness. Specifics vary between jurisdictions, for example article 39 of the Philippine Civil Code provides a comprehensive overview of the most typical circumstances resulting in lost or diminished juridical capacity: age, mental disability, the state of being a deaf-mute, penalty, absence, (Note: For example, an individual not present to manage and dispose of their property) insolvency, and trusteeship.

Each contractual party must be a "competent person" having legal capacity. The parties may be natural persons ("individuals") or juristic persons ("corporations"). An agreement is formed when an "offer" is accepted. The parties must have an intention to be legally bound; and to be valid, the agreement must have both proper "form" and a lawful object. In England (and in jurisdictions using English contract principles), the parties must also exchange "consideration" to create a "mutuality of obligation", as in Simpkins v Pays.

In the United States, persons under 18 are typically minor and their contracts are considered voidable; however, if the minor voids the contract and benefits received by the minor are returnable, those benefits must be returned. The minor can enforce breaches of contract by an adult while, absent ratification upon the minor's reaching adulthood, the adult's enforcement may be more limited.

Meanwhile, in Singapore, while individuals under the age of 21 are regarded as minors, sections 35 and 36 of the Civil Law Act 1909 provide that certain contracts entered into by minors aged 18 and above are to be treated as though they were adults. Additionally, the Minors' Contracts Act 1987 as applicable in Singapore and in England and Wales provides that a contract entered into by a minor is not automatically unenforceable and that a "court may, if it is just and equitable to do so, require the [minor] defendant to transfer to the plaintiff any property acquired by the defendant under the contract, or any property representing it".

In addition to age, a party to a contract may lack capacity on the grounds of mental illness or senility. Under Singapore's Mental Capacity Act 2008, for example, "a person lacks capacity in relation to a matter if at the material time the person is unable to make a decision for himself or herself in relation to the matter because of an impairment of, or a disturbance in the functioning of, the mind or brain". Where an individual lacks capacity on grounds of mental illness or senility, a relative or other responsible person may obtain a lasting power of attorney to make decisions concerning the "personal welfare" of the person lacking capacity, the "property and [financial] affairs" of the person, or both. Questions as to whether an individual has the capacity to make decisions either generally or with regard to a particular matter or class of matters are generally resolved by a judicial declaration and the court making the declaration may appoint one or more individuals to act as conservators (American English) or deputies (Commonwealth English) for the person lacking capacity.

==== Implied terms ====
While an express term is stated by parties during negotiation or written in a contractual document, implied terms are not stated but nevertheless form a provision of the contract. Implied terms are fully enforceable and, depending on the jurisdiction, may arise as a result of the conduct or expectations of the parties, (Note: Such terms may be implied due to the factual circumstances or conduct of the parties. In the case of BP Refinery (Westernport) Pty Ltd v Shire of Hastings, the UK Privy Council, on appeal from Australia, proposed a five-stage test to determine situations where the facts of a case may imply terms. The classic tests have been the "business efficacy test" and the "officious bystander test". Under the "business efficacy test", first proposed in The Moorcock [1889], the minimum terms necessary to give business efficacy to the contract will be implied. Under the officious bystander test (named in Southern Foundries (1926) Ltd v Shirlaw [1940] but actually originating in Reigate v. Union Manufacturing Co (Ramsbottom) Ltd [1918]), a term can only be implied in fact if an "officious bystander" listening to the contract negotiations suggested that the term be included the parties would promptly agree. The difference between these tests is questionable.) by virtue of custom (i.e. general unspoken norms within a particular industry), or by operation of law.

Statutes or precedent may create implied contractual terms, particularly in standardised relationships such as employment or shipping contracts. The Uniform Commercial Code of the United States also imposes an implied covenant of good faith and fair dealing in performance and enforcement of contracts covered by the Code. In addition, Australia, Israel and India imply a similar good faith term through laws while the Supreme Court of Canada has developed a doctrine of honest contractual performance. While English law does not impose such a requirement, there is nevertheless an overarching concept of "legitimate expectation" in most common law jurisdictions.

Most jurisdictions have specific legal provisions which deal directly with sale of goods, lease transactions, and trade practices. In the United States, prominent examples include, in the case of products, an implied warranty of merchantability and fitness for a particular purpose, and in the case of homes an implied warranty of habitability. In the United Kingdom, implied terms may be created by statute (e.g. Sale of Goods Act 1979, the Consumer Rights Act 2015 and the Hague-Visby Rules), common law (e.g. The Moorcock, which introduced the "business efficacy" test), previous dealings (e.g. Spurling v Bradshaw), or custom (e.g. Hutton v Warren).

In many common law jurisdictions, insurance contracts are subject to a term implied in law of utmost good faith, and this is codified (for example) in section 17 of Singapore's Marine Insurance Act 1909. Additionally, depending on jurisdiction, marine and life insurance contracts may require the policyholder to have an insurable interest in the asset or life insured. In contrast, instead of requiring a policyholder to hold an insurable interest in the life insured, German law merely requires the policyholder to obtain the consent of the person whose life is insured. As opposed to being implied by law or fact, a term may be implied on the basis of custom or usage in a particular market or context. In the Australian case of Con-Stan Industries of Australia Pty Ltd v Norwich Winterthur (Aust) Limited, the requirements for a term to be implied by custom were set out. For a term to be implied by custom it needs to be "so well known and acquiesced in that everyone making a contract in that situation can reasonably be presumed to have imported that term into the contract".

=== Contract transition ===
Contract transition refers to the process or period of adaptation to becoming ready to perform the contract: this may involve appointing or redesignating staff, acquiring resources or infrastructure or establishing a supply chain, and mobilising a contract delivery team to succeed the "deal team" who won the contract.

=== Performance ===
Performance refers to the completion of the tasks or obligations anticipated by the contract. In some cases, such as a retail purchase transaction, the formation and performance of the contract occur at the same time, but when a contract involves a promise to do something in the future, performance refers to the later fulfillment of that promise. Performance varies according to the particular circumstances. While a contract is being performed, it is called an executory contract, and when it is completed it is an executed contract: "performance" may also be referred to as the "execution" of a contract. In some cases there may have been substantial performance but not complete performance, which allows the performing party to be partially compensated.

=== Remedies ===
Remedies for breach of contract generally include damages or forms of specific relief, including but not limited to: specific performance, injunctions, declaratory relief, and rescission. The availability of different remedies varies from jurisdiction to jurisdiction, with common law jurisprudence preferring to award damages where possible while civil law jurisdictions are more inclined toward specific relief.

In the United Kingdom and Singapore, breach of contract is defined in the Unfair Contract Terms Act 1977 as: [i] non-performance, [ii] poor performance, [iii] part-performance, or [iv] performance which is substantially different from what was reasonably expected. Innocent parties may repudiate (cancel) the contract only for a major breach (breach of condition), but they may always recover compensatory damages, provided that the breach has caused foreseeable loss.

==== Damages ====
There are several different types of damages that may be awarded for breach of contract.

- Compensatory damages are given to the party injured by the breach of contract. With compensatory damages, there are two heads of loss, consequential damage and direct damage. In theory, compensatory damages are designed to put the injured party in his or her rightful position, usually through an award of expectation damages.
- Liquidated damages are an estimate of loss agreed to in the contract, so that the court avoids calculating compensatory damages and the parties have greater certainty. Liquidated damages clauses may serve either a compensatory or a punitive purpose and, when aimed at the latter, may be referred to as "penalty clauses". Penalty clauses serving a purely punitive purpose are void or limited on public policy grounds in most (though not all) common law and civil law jurisdictions, although jurisdictions which recognise penalty clauses may nevertheless permit courts to intervene in cases where enforcement would be inequitable.
- Nominal damages consist of a small cash amount where the court concludes that the defendant is in breach but the plaintiff has suffered no quantifiable pecuniary loss, and may be sought to obtain a legal record of who was at fault.
- Punitive or exemplary damages are used to punish the party at fault. Even though such damages are not intended primarily to compensate, nevertheless the claimant (and not the state) receives the award. Exemplary damages are not recognised nor permitted in some jurisdictions. In common law jurisdictions, exemplary damages are not available for breach of contract, but are possible after fraud. Although vitiating factors (such as misrepresentation, mistake, undue influence and duress) relate to contracts, they are not contractual actions in themselves. Nevertheless, they allow a claimant in contract to get exemplary damages for breach.

Compensatory damages compensate the plaintiff for actual losses suffered as accurately as possible. They may be expectation damages, reliance damages or restitutionary damages. Expectation damages are awarded to put the party in as good of a position as the party would have been in had the contract been performed as promised. Reliance damages are usually awarded where no reasonably reliable estimate of expectation loss can be arrived at or at the option of the plaintiff. Reliance losses cover expense suffered in reliance to the promise. Examples where reliance damages have been awarded because profits are too speculative include the Australian case of McRae v Commonwealth Disposals Commission which concerned a contract for the rights to salvage a ship. In Anglia Television Ltd v. Reed the English Court of Appeal awarded the plaintiff expenditures incurred prior to the contract in preparation of performance.

Common law jurisdictions traditionally distinguish between legitimate liquidated damages, which are valid and enforceable and penalties, which are usually prohibited as against public policy. The traditional test to determine which category a clause falls into was established by the English House of Lords in Dunlop Pneumatic Tyre Co Ltd v New Garage & Motor Co Ltd In Canadian common law provinces, penalty clauses are considered valid and enforceable provided that they are not unconscionable. The Canadian position is similar to the middle-ground approach taken under Philippine contract law, which provides that a penalty clause providing for liquidated damages is enforceable unless either the clause is "iniquitous or unconscionable" or the breach of contract in question is not one that was envisioned by the parties when they concluded the contract. A similar approach has been adopted by the High Court of Australia and the Supreme Court of the United Kingdom over the first few decades of the twenty-first century; whereby a penalty clause is unenforceable only if it is disproportionate to the "legitimate interests", not restricted to seeking compensation, of the non-infringing party.

After a breach has occurred, the innocent party has a duty to mitigate loss by taking any reasonable steps. Failure to mitigate means that damages may be reduced or even denied altogether. However, Michael Furmston has argued that "it is wrong to express (the mitigation) rule by stating that the plaintiff is under a duty to mitigate his loss", citing Sotiros Shipping Inc v Sameiet, The Solholt. If a party provides notice that the contract will not be completed, an anticipatory breach occurs.

Damages may be general or consequential. General damages are those damages which naturally flow from a breach of contract. Consequential damages are those damages which, although not naturally flowing from a breach, are naturally supposed by both parties at the time of contract formation. An example would be when someone rents a car to get to a business meeting, but when that person arrives to pick up the car, it is not there. General damages would be the cost of renting a different car. Consequential damages would be the lost business if that person was unable to get to the meeting, if both parties knew the reason the party was renting the car. To recover damages, a claimant must show that the breach of contract caused foreseeable loss. Hadley v Baxendale established that the test of foreseeability is both objective or subjective. In other words, is it foreseeable to the objective bystander, or to the contracting parties, who may have special knowledge? On the facts of Hadley, where a miller lost production because a carrier delayed taking broken mill parts for repair, the court held that no damages were payable since the loss was foreseeable neither by the "reasonable man" nor by the carrier, both of whom would have expected the miller to have a spare part in store.

==== Specific relief ====
There may be circumstances in which it would be unjust to permit the defaulting party simply to buy out the injured party with damages — for example, where an art collector purchases a rare painting and the vendor refuses to deliver.

In most common law jurisdictions, such circumstances are dealt with by court orders for "specific performance", requiring that the contract or a part thereof be performed. In some circumstances a court will order a party to perform his or her promise or issue an injunction requiring a party refrain from doing something that would breach the contract. A specific performance is obtainable for the breach of a contract to sell land or real estate on such grounds that the property has a unique value. In the United States by way of the 13th Amendment to the United States Constitution, specific performance in personal service contracts is only legal "as punishment for a crime whereof the party shall have been duly convicted". Both an order for specific performance and an injunction are discretionary remedies, originating for the most part in equity. Neither is available as of right and in most jurisdictions and most circumstances a court will not normally order specific performance. A contract for the sale of real property is a notable exception. In most jurisdictions, the sale of real property is enforceable by specific performance. Even in this case the defences to an action in equity (such as laches, the bona fide purchaser rule, or unclean hands) may act as a bar to specific performance.

In Indian law, the Specific Relief Act 1963 codifies the rules surrounding specific performance and other remedies aside from damages. Relief available under the act is limited to recovery of possession of property, specific performance of contracts, rectification of instruments, rescission of contracts, cancellation of instruments, declaratory relief, and injunctions.

Where appropriate, courts in most common and civil law jurisdictions may permit declaratory relief or rescission of contracts. To rescind is to set aside or unmake a contract. There are four different ways in which contracts can be set aside. A contract may be deemed 'void', 'voidable' or 'unenforceable', or declared "ineffective". Voidness implies that a contract never came into existence. Voidability implies that one or both parties may declare a contract ineffective at their wish. Unenforceability implies that neither party may have recourse to a court for a remedy. Ineffectiveness arises when a contract is terminated by order of a court, where a public body has failed to satisfy the requirements of public procurement law.

=== Defences ===
Defences to claims under contract law include vitiating factors, which defences operate to determine whether a purported contract is either (1) void or (2) voidable, or assertions that the other party failed to perform their obligations within a reasonable period of time. With regard to contracts of a commercial nature, the UNIDROIT Principles of International Commercial Contracts provides a general outline of the grounds under which a contract can be set aside. Where a contract or term is voidable, the party entitled to avoid may either conditionally or unconditionally choose to affirm the contract or term as outlined in Article 3.2.9 of the Principles which states that "if the party entitled to avoid the contract expressly or impliedly confirms the contract after the period of time for giving notice of avoidance has begun to run, avoidance of the contract is excluded". Additionally, Article 3.2.13 provides that "where a ground of avoidance affects only individual terms of the contract, the effect of avoidance is limited to those terms unless, having regard to the circumstances, it is unreasonable to uphold the remaining contract".

Although provisions for the voidability of a contract for conduct of the other party are generally similar across jurisdictions, voidability on the grounds of a third party's conduct is more contentious. Article 3.2.8 of the Principles provides that where conduct constituting grounds for rescission "is imputable to, or is known or ought to be known by, a third person for whose acts the other party is responsible, the contract may be avoided under the same conditions as if the behaviour or knowledge had been that of the party itself". Similarly, while vitiating factors are similar across jurisdictions, the extent to which a failure by another party to a contract may form grounds for rescission or an early termination of contractual obligations varies between jurisdictions. For instance, Mainland Chinese law provides that a party may seek to rescind a contract or terminate its remaining obligations if the other party "expresses or indicates by act that it will not perform the principal obligation", "delays performance of the principal obligation and still fails to perform it within a reasonable period of time", or "delays performance of the obligation or has otherwise acted in breach of the contract, thus making it impossible to achieve the purpose of the contract".

==== Misrepresentation ====
Misrepresentation means a false statement of fact that occurs prior to a contract made by one party to another party and has the effect of inducing that party into the contract. For example, under certain circumstances, false statements or promises made by a seller of goods regarding the quality or nature of the product that the seller has may constitute misrepresentation. A finding of misrepresentation allows for a remedy of rescission and sometimes damages depending on the type of misrepresentation. Rescission is the principal remedy and damages are also available if a tort is established. Article 3.2.5 of the Principles of International Commercial Contracts provides that "a party may avoid the contract when it has been led to conclude the contract by the other party's fraudulent representation, including language or practices, or fraudulent non- disclosure of circumstances which, according to reasonable commercial standards of fair dealing, the latter party should have disclosed".

In common law jurisdictions, to prove misrepresentation or fraud, there traditionally must be evidence that shows a claim was made, said claim was false, the party making the claim knew the claim was false, and that party's intention was for a transaction to occur based upon the false claim. In order to obtain relief, there must be a positive misrepresentation of law and also, the person to whom the representation was made must have been misled by and relied on this misrepresentation:Public Trustee v Taylor. There are two types of misrepresentation: fraud in the factum and fraud in inducement. Fraud in the factum focuses on whether the party alleging misrepresentation knew they were creating a contract. If the party did not know that they were entering into a contract, there is no meeting of the minds, and the contract is void. Fraud in inducement focuses on misrepresentation attempting to get the party to enter into the contract. Misrepresentation of a material fact (if the party knew the truth, that party would not have entered into the contract) makes a contract voidable. Assume two people, Party A and Party B, enter into a contract. Then, it is later determined that Party A did not fully understand the facts and information described within the contract. If Party B used this lack of understanding against Party A to enter into the contract, Party A has the right to void the contract. According to Gordon v Selico [1986] it is possible to misrepresent either by words or conduct. Generally, statements of opinion or intention are not statements of fact in the context of misrepresentation. If one party claims specialist knowledge on the topic discussed, then it is more likely for the courts to hold a statement of opinion by that party as a statement of fact.

In Singapore and the United Kingdom, the Misrepresentation Act 1967 provides that innocent misrepresentations can also be grounds for damages and remission of the relevant contract. Section 35 of the Contract and Commercial Law Act 2017 similarly provides for damages in cases of both innocent and fraudulent misrepresentation in New Zealand. In assessing remedies for an innocent misrepresentation, the judge takes into account the likelihood a party would rely on the false claim and how significant the false claim was. Contract law does not delineate any clear boundary as to what is considered an acceptable false claim or what is unacceptable. Therefore, the question is what types of false claims (or deceptions) will be significant enough to void a contract based on said deception. Advertisements utilising "puffing", or the practice of exaggerating certain things, fall under this question of possible false claims.

The foundational principle of "caveat emptor", which means "let the buyer beware", applies to all American transactions. In Laidlaw v. Organ, the Supreme Court decided that the buyer did not have to inform the seller of information the buyer knew could affect the price of the product.

It is a fallacy that an opinion cannot be a statement of fact. If a statement is the honest expression of an opinion honestly entertained, it cannot be said that it involves any fraudulent misrepresentations of fact.

==== Mistake ====
Section 2 of the UNIDROIT Principles of International Commercial Contracts defines the extent to which a mistake is typically accepted in most jurisdictions as grounds to avoid a contract. Under Article 3.1.2 of the Principles, a "mistake is an erroneous assumption relating to facts or to law existing when the contract was concluded". Article 3.1.3 of the Principles provides that "a party may only avoid the contract for mistake if, when the contract was concluded, the mistake was of such importance that a reasonable person in the same situation as the party in error would only have concluded the contract on materially different terms or would not have concluded it at all if the true state of affairs had been known". Additionally, Article 3.1.3 provides that a party seeking to avoid a contract must show that either "the other party made the same mistake, or caused the mistake, or knew or ought to have known of the mistake and it was contrary to reasonable commercial standards of fair dealing to leave the mistaken party in error" or "the other party had not at the time of avoidance reasonably acted in reliance on the contract". However, a party cannot seek to avoid a contract on the grounds of a mistake if "it was grossly negligent in committing the mistake" or "the mistake relates to a matter in regard to which the risk of mistake ... should be borne by the mistaken party".

Common law jurisdictions identify three types of mistake in contract: common mistake, mutual mistake, and unilateral mistake.

- Common mistake occurs when both parties hold the same mistaken belief of the facts which is material and fundamental to their contract. This is demonstrated in the case of Bell v. Lever Brothers Ltd., which established that common mistake can only void a contract if the mistake of the subject-matter was sufficiently fundamental to render its identity different from what was contracted, making the performance of the contract impossible. In Great Peace Shipping Ltd v Tsavliris Salvage (International) Ltd, the court held that the common law will grant relief against common mistake, if the test in Bell v. Lever Bros Ltd is made out. If one party has knowledge and the other does not, and the party with the knowledge promises or guarantees the existence of the subject matter, that party will be in breach if the subject matter does not exist.
- Mutual mistake occurs when both parties of a contract are mistaken as to the terms. Each believes they are contracting to something different. Courts usually try to uphold such mistakes if a reasonable interpretation of the terms can be found. However, a contract based on a mutual mistake in judgment does not cause the contract to be voidable by the party that is adversely affected. See Raffles v Wichelhaus.
- Unilateral mistake occurs when only one party to a contract is mistaken as to the terms or subject-matter. The courts will uphold such a contract unless it was determined that the non-mistaken party was aware of the mistake and tried to take advantage of the mistake. It is also possible for a contract to be void if there was a mistake in the identity of the contracting party. An example is in Lewis v Avery where Lord Denning MR held that the contract can only be voided if the plaintiff can show that, at the time of agreement, the plaintiff believed the other party's identity was of vital importance. A mere mistaken belief as to the credibility of the other party is not sufficient. In certain circumstances, the defence of non est factum can be utilised in common law jurisdictions to rescind a contract on the grounds of a substantial unilateral mistake. Under Article 3.2.10 of the Principles, where a contract is voidable by a party on the grounds of a unilateral mistake but the other party "declares itself willing to perform or performs the contract as it was understood by the party entitled to avoidance", "the contract is considered to have been concluded as the [other] party understood it" and "the right to avoidance is lost".

==== Threats and unequal bargaining power ====
The UNIDROIT Principles of International Commercial Contracts outlines a comprehensive list of circumstances in which fraud committed by or threats made by a party constitute grounds for avoiding the contract. With regard to threats, Article 3.2.6 provides that "a party may avoid the contract when it has been led to conclude the contract by the other party's unjustified threat" if the action threatened is so severe as to "leave the first party no reasonable alternative". A threat is considered "unjustified" under Article 3.2.6 if "the act or omission with which a party has been threatened is wrongful in itself, or it is wrongful to use it as a means to obtain the conclusion of the contract". In common law jurisdictions, the notion of an unjustified threat is referred to as "duress". Black's Law Dictionary defines duress as a "threat of harm made to compel a person to do something against his or her will or judgment; esp., a wrongful threat made by one person to compel a manifestation of seeming assent by another person to a transaction without real volition" and it constitutes grounds for setting aside a contract. An example is in Barton v Armstrong [1976] in a person was threatened with death if they did not sign the contract. An innocent party wishing to set aside a contract for duress to the person only needs to prove that the threat was made and that it was a reason for entry into the contract; the burden of proof then shifts to the other party to prove that the threat had no effect in causing the party to enter into the contract. There can also be duress to goods and sometimes, "economic duress".

Aside from fraud and unjustified threats, contracts can also generally be set aside on the grounds that one party exercised its superior bargaining power in order to impose inequitable terms upon the other party. Article 3.2.7 of the Principles provides that "a party may avoid the contract or an individual term of it if, at the time of the conclusion of the contract, the contract or term unjustifiably gave the other party an excessive advantage" and specifies that, in determining whether the term was inequitable, a court or arbitrator should consider the extent to which "the other party has taken unfair advantage of the first party's dependence, economic distress or urgent needs, or of its improvidence, ignorance, inexperience or lack of bargaining skill". In addition to setting the contract aside, Article 3.2.7 also provides that courts may apply the blue pencil doctrine and modify or nullify any inequitable terms while leaving the contract otherwise intact. In common law jurisdictions, the related equitable doctrine of undue influence enables courts to provide a remedy in situations involving one person taking advantage of a position of power or influence over another person. Where a special relationship exists, such as between parent and child or solicitor and client, courts in common law jurisdictions have broad discretion as to whether a remedy is provided. When no special relationship exists, the question is whether there was a relationship of such trust and confidence that it should give rise to such a presumption. In Australian law, a contract can additionally be set aside due to unconscionable dealing. Firstly, the claimant must show that they were under a special disability, the test for this being that they were unable to act in their best interest. Secondly, the claimant must show that the defendant took advantage of this special disability.

==== Illegal contracts ====
If based on an illegal purpose or contrary to public policy, a contract is void. This principle is codified by Article 3.3.1 of the Principles, which provides that:

- Where a contract infringes a mandatory rule; (Note: Article 1.4 of the Principles recognises the applicability of domestic laws that cannot be derogated from) whether of national, international, or supranational origin; the effects of that infringement upon the contract are the effects...expressly prescribed by that mandatory rule.
- Where the mandatory rule does not expressly prescribe the effects of an infringement upon a contract, the parties have the right to exercise such remedies under the contract as in the circumstances are reasonable.
- In determining what is reasonable regard is to be had in particular to:
  - The purpose of the infringed rule
  - The category of persons for whose protection the rule exists
  - Any sanction that may be imposed under the rule infringed
  - The seriousness of the infringement
  - Whether one or both parties knew or ought to have known of the infringement
  - Whether the performance of the contract necessitates the infringement
  - The parties' reasonable expectations

Article 3.3.2 provides that, where reasonable, an infringement may warrant restitution.

In the 1996 Canadian case of Royal Bank of Canada v. Newell a woman forged her husband's signature, and her husband agreed to assume "all liability and responsibility" for the forged checks. However, the agreement was unenforceable as it was intended to "stifle a criminal prosecution", and the bank was forced to return the payments made by the husband. In the U.S., one unusual type of unenforceable contract is a personal employment contract to work as a spy or secret agent. This is because the very secrecy of the contract is a condition of the contract (in order to maintain plausible deniability). If the spy subsequently sues the government on the contract over issues like salary or benefits, then the spy has breached the contract by revealing its existence. It is thus unenforceable on that ground, as well as the public policy of maintaining national security (since a disgruntled agent might try to reveal all the government's secrets during his/her lawsuit). Other types of unenforceable employment contracts include contracts agreeing to work for less than minimum wage and forfeiting the right to workman's compensation in cases where workman's compensation is due.

==== Force majeure ====
All jurisdictions, civil and common law alike, typically provide for contractual obligations to be terminated or reduced in cases of force majeure or (in traditional common law terminology) frustration of purpose. Article 7.1.7 of the Principles provides that "Non-performance by a party is excused if that party proves that the non-performance was due to an impediment beyond its control and that it could not reasonably be expected to have taken the impediment into account at the time of the conclusion of the contract or to have avoided or overcome it or its consequences". Under the Civil Code of the People's Republic of China, any party to a contract may rescind it if "the purpose of the contract cannot be achieved due to force majeure". Similarly, the Frustrated Contracts Act 1959 (Singapore) and subpart 4 of the Contract and Commercial Law Act 2017 (New Zealand) provide remedies for parties to contracts that cannot be performed due to force majeure including rescission, compensation for goods or services already provided, and the severability of portions of the contract that can and cannot be performed. Additionally, the Chinese civil code provides that a party may terminate its contractual obligations if the party to whom its obligations are owned is under financial distress.

==== Hardship ====
Subject to the laws of the jurisdiction in which a challenge is brought, contracts may in certain circumstances be modified or terminated on the basis of hardship to the party seeking relief from contractual obligations.

Hardship is defined by Article 6.2.2 of the UNIDROIT Principles as "where the occurrence of events fundamentally alters the equilibrium of the contract either because the cost of a party's performance has increased or because the value of the performance a party receives has diminished" provided that either the risk of the events occurring was not assumed by the party alleging hardship or that the events' occurrence was "beyond the control of the disadvantaged party", unknown until after the conclusion of the contract, or "could not reasonably have been taken into account" by the party. Article 6.2.3 of the Principles provides that a party facing hardship is entitled to request renegotiation of the contract and, if negotiations are unsuccessful, may apply to the appropriate court to terminate or modify the contract or provision thereof.

In England and Wales, Benjamin's Sale of Goods sets a high threshold for the use of claim to be "prevented" from complying with a contractual liability, stating that to show that a party is "unable" to perform the contract, they must show that performance is physically or legally impossible. Difficulty and unprofitability are not treated as making performance impossible.

==== Set-off ====
A partial defence available in a variety of civil-, common-, and mixed-law jurisdictions is that of set-off or the netting of obligations. This entails forfeiting one or obligations owed by the other party in exchange for being excused for the performance of a party's own obligations toward the other party. It permits the rights to be used to discharge the liabilities where cross claims exist between a plaintiff and a respondent, the result being that the gross claims of mutual debt produce a single net claim. The net claim is known as a net position. In other words, a set-off is the right of a debtor to balance mutual debts with a creditor. Any balance remaining due either of the parties is still owed, but the mutual debts have been set off. The power of net positions lies in reducing credit exposure, and also offers regulatory capital requirement and settlement advantages, which contribute to market stability.

As per Article 8.1 of the Principles, "where two parties owe each other money or other performances of the same kind, either of them ("the first party") may set off its obligation against that of its obligee" ("the other party") if when set-off is invoked:

- The first party is entitled to perform its obligation
- Where the obligations of the two parties do not arise from the same contract, the nature of the other party's obligation (i.e. existence and amount) is ascertained and performance is due
- Where the obligations of the two parties arise from the same contract, the other party's performance is due (regardless of whether the obligation's nature is ascertained

The requirement that the obligations be "of the same kind" is broader than the requirement in some legal systems that obligations being set-off be fungible, while still excluding obligations of a fundamentally personal nature. Where the obligations in question are owed in different currencies, Article 8.2 provides that set-off may be invoked if the currencies in question are freely convertible and the parties have not agreed that the first party may only pay in a specified currency. Rather than operating automatically or following a court's order, Article 8.3 provides that set-off may only be exercised by notice to the other party; furthermore, Article 8.4 further provides that if the notice does not specify the obligations to which it relates, the other party may do so by way of a declaration made within a reasonable time, failing which the set-off relates to all obligations proportionally. The effect of set-off, as per Article 8.5, is that:

- The relevant obligations are discharged
- If obligations differ in amount, set-off discharges the obligations up to the amount of the lesser obligation.
- Set-off takes effect as from the time of notice.

== Contracts in other jurisdictions ==
The primary factor distinguishing civil-law and mixed-law jurisdictions from their common law counterparts is the absence of the requirement of consideration and thus the absence of any legal distinction between contracts by deed and other written contracts. Contract law in the majority of civil law jurisdictions is part of the broader law of obligations codified in a civil or commercial code clearly outlining the extent to which public policy goals limit freedom to contract and adhering to the general principle that the sole formal requirement for a contract to be formed is the existence of a meeting of the minds between the two parties at the time the contract is purported to have been formed.

Civil law jurisdictions with codified laws of obligations distinguish between nominate and innominate contracts. Nominate contracts are standardised categories of contracts which are closely regulated in form and substance by law. Contracts for sale, gift, lease, and insurance are generally regulated as nominate contracts. The obligor and obligee under nominate contracts have rights and obligations specially prescribed by law. Nominate contracts are usually statutorily required to include certain express terms (essentialia) and are construed to include terms implied in law. Unlike civil law jurisdictions with codified laws of obligations, jurisdictions following Roman-Dutch law or Scandinavian law typically lack specific provisions for nominate contracts as their law of obligations is largely determined by judicial precedent and individual statutes, similar to common law jurisdictions. Nevertheless, the principles underlying the formation of contracts in these jurisdictions are closely related to those of other civil law jurisdictions.

=== Principles ===
==== Formation and validity ====
Under the Chinese Civil Code, contracts carry an implied term that, in addition to performing "their respective obligations as agreed in the contract", "the parties shall comply with the principle of good faith, and perform such obligations as sending notification, rendering assistance, and keeping confidentiality in accordance with the nature and purpose of the contract and the course of dealing". Additionally, the Code imposes an implied term that "the parties shall avoid wasting the resources, polluting the environment, or damaging the ecology in the course of performance of the contract". The inclusion of an implied term protecting the environment under Chinese contract law is analogous to the imposition under Indian tort law of absolute liability for enterprises that cause pollution or other harm to property or individuals when conducting hazardous activities under the rule in M. C. Mehta v. Union of India and to the sui generis rights of personhood accorded to the environment under the laws of several jurisdictions. While other jurisdictions impose protections for the environment through tort law, regulations, or environmental personhood, Chinese law thus utilises contractual terms implied in law.

Nominate contracts in civil law jurisdictions and contracts subject to the United Nations Convention on Contracts for the International Sale of Goods (CISG) are subject to terms implied by the appropriate civil or commercial code or by the convention, respectively. Many civil law jurisdictions impose a legal duty of good faith which extends to the negotiation as well as performance of contracts. Under the CISG, a variety of terms implied by law are prescribed for contracts involving the international sale of goods. Generally, the goods must be of the quality, quantity, and description required by the contract, be suitably packaged and fit for purpose. The seller is obliged to deliver goods that are not subject to claims from a third party for infringement of industrial or intellectual property rights in the State where the goods are to be sold. The buyer is obliged to promptly examine the goods and, subject to some qualifications, must advise the seller of any lack of conformity within "a reasonable time" and no later than within two years of receipt.

==== Remedies ====
Civil law jurisdictions may award specific performance more readily than common law jurisdictions, which generally prefer to award damages. Article 7.2.2 of the International Principles of Commercial Contracts takes a moderate approach, providing that "where a party who owes an obligation other than one to pay money does not perform, the other party may require performance" except where "performance is impossible in law or in fact" or "performance or, where relevant, enforcement is unreasonably burdensome or expensive". Under the Principles, specific relief is thus preferred but courts and arbitrators may instead opt to award damages based on a contextual assessment of the complexity specific relief would result in.

In civil law jurisdictions, penalty clauses are permitted and seen to serve two purposes: deterring the obligee from defaulting on their obligations and providing predictable and guaranteed compensation for any breach of contract that takes place.

Under the United Nations Convention on Contracts for the International Sale of Goods (CISG), remedies of the buyer and seller depend upon the character of a breach of the contract. If the breach is fundamental, then the other party is substantially deprived of what it expected to receive under the contract. Provided that an objective test shows that the breach could not have been foreseen, then the contract may be avoided and the aggrieved party may claim damages. Where part performance of a contract has occurred, then the performing party may recover any payment made or good supplied; this contrasts with the common law where there is generally no right to recover a good supplied unless title has been retained or damages are inadequate, only a right to claim the value of the good. If the breach is not fundamental, then the contract is not avoided and remedies may be sought including claiming damages, specific performance, and adjustment of price. Damages that may be awarded conform to the common law rules in Hadley v Baxendale but it has been argued the test of foreseeability is substantially broader and consequently more generous to the aggrieved party.

In jurisdictions applying Roman-Dutch law, a claim for specific performance is the primary and obvious and most basic remedy for breach of contract, upholding as it does the expectation interest of the creditor: When one enters into a contract, one expects performance in terms of it. This approach is contrary to that taken under English law, where damages are preferred, and where specific performance is a special discretionary remedy that may be sought only in certain circumstances. A claim for specific performance may be for the payment of a sum of money (ad pecuniam solvendum), a claim for the performance of some positive act other than payment of money (ad factum praestandum) or a claim to enforce a negative obligation. The remedy of specific performance is not absolute and does not guarantee success. Even where it is shown that there has been a breach, the remedy is not granted unless the innocent party is ready to perform and performance is subjectively and objectively possible for the defendant. The courts have exercised an equitable discretion to refuse a claim for specific performance, usually on the grounds of impossibility, undue hardship or in claims for the enforcement of personal services. An order for specific performance is enforced in keeping with the ordinary rules of procedure. The cases of Benson v SA Mutual Life, Santos v Igesund and Haynes v King William's Town Municipality set out guidelines to be taken into consideration where the court is asked to grant specific performance. A court does not make an order for specific performance in cases where:

- Performance is personal.
- There is a relative impossibility, where the specific person (an injured pop star, for example) cannot perform.
- Because it would have to supervise its decree, it would be difficult for the court to enforce it.
- The defendant is insolvent.
- Performance would severely prejudice third parties.
- It conflicts with public policy and would be inappropriate.
- As in Haynes, the cost to the defendant in being compelled to perform is out proportion to the corresponding benefit to the plaintiff, and the latter can equally well be compensated by an award of damages, an order is not made for specific performance. (The hardship of the contract at the time of its concluded, then, is not decisive of the matter; it may also be judged of at the time performance is claimed.)

In other civil law jurisdictions, the range of available remedies varies but typically includes provision for specific performance, rescission, declaratory relief, and injunctions although the distinction between specific performance and injunctions does not necessarily exist in all civil law jurisdictions. In jurisdictions with codified laws of obligations, the extent of remedies available and the circumstances in which they are provided is outlined in the civil or commercial code.

=== Historical civil-law traditions ===
==== French contract law ====
In jurisdictions whose system of contract law is derived from the Napoleonic Code (or from its derivatives, e.g. the Civil Code of Lower Canada or the Egyptian Civil Code), contracts can be divided into their negotium (the substantive content of the contract) and their instrumentum (the formal significance attached to the existence of the contract itself). In principle, only the negotium is essential to the formation of a valid contract, in line with the principle of substance over form. In France, under article 1128 of the French Civil Code, the principle of the parties' mutual assent is codified as the primary doctrine underlying French contract law. Similarly, article 1385 of the Civil Code of Quebec codifies the principle that, in general, contracts are formed by the exchange of consent between natural or juridical persons possessing capacity to contract. Following the collapse of the Soviet Union, the Russian Federation's new civil code adopted in 1994 replaced its previous system of socialist law with a system similar to the French Civil Code and is therefore also based largely on the exchange of mutual assent.

Contracts in systems based on the Napoleonic Code can typically be categorised as consensual contracts, which are formed solely on the basis of the parties' exchange of consent to form legal relations; real contracts, which are analogous to bailments in common law and are formed not only by mutual assent but also by the transfer of the possession of property; or contrats solennels, which are analogous to deeds in common law jurisdictions and require notarial execution to be formalized. Thus, while consensual contracts and real contracts can be formed solely by the actions of the parties, contrats solennels can only be formed via specified formal processes. Nevertheless, all three categories of contracts are based solely on the exchange of mutual assent, differing only in the manner in which assent is expressed.

===== Quebec contract law =====
Quebec contract law is a mixed-law offshoot of French contract law that has been heavily influenced by British and Anglo-Canadian common law. In general, the rules governing the formation of a contract under Quebec law are codified in Book 5, Title 1, Chapter 2, Division 3 of the Quebec Civil Code. Except where a specific provision of law requires otherwise, a contract is formed by the exchange of consent between persons with the capacity to enter into a contract. Additionally, a valid contract must have a iusta causa and an object. A contract's causa is the parties' reason for entering into the contract and may be implied rather than express. The object of a contract is the legal operation (i.e. creation, modifying, or extinguishing one or more right) contemplated by the parties at the time of the contract's formation. An object is only valid if it is not prohibited by law or on grounds of public policy (contra bonos moros). A contract which does not meet the conditions of its formation may be annulled.

Additionally, with regard to maritime law, Quebec follows the Anglo-Canadian common law. This is because Canadian maritime law developed a distinct jurisdiction and area of law within the legislative purview of Parliament rather than the provincial legislatures and, as such, is uniform across the countries. In Ordon Estate v. Grail, the Supreme Court of Canada stated that "the substantive content of Canadian maritime law is...the body of law administered in England by the High Court on its Admiralty side in 1934, as that body of law has been amended by the Canadian Parliament and as it has developed by judicial precedent", and that "most of Canadian maritime law with respect to issues of tort, contract, agency and bailment is founded upon the English common law" but nevertheless that "English admiralty law as incorporated into Canadian law in 1934 was an amalgam of principles deriving in large part from both the common law and the civilian tradition". The formation of contracts under Canadian maritime law thus functions similarly but not identically to the formation of contracts in the country's common law provinces; furthermore, the implementation of rules derived from international conventions subject maritime contracts to distinct rules often derived from international norms. Similarly, with regard to bills of exchange and promissory notes, Quebec and the remainder of the Canadian provinces and territories follow a distinct legal system based on, but not identical to, the contract law of Canada's common law jurisdictions. As Canadian law regarding bills of exchange and promissory notes is derived from English common law, consideration is required for the issue of a valid bill of exchange or promissory note, but the requirement for consideration is looser, with the federal Bills of Exchange Act providing that the requirement for consideration may be satisfied either by "any consideration sufficient to support a simple contract" in the country's common law provinces and territories or by "an antecedent debt or liability", thus enabling past consideration to be valid as it is under Indian contract law.

Quebec contract law also shares two distinctly Canadian duties of good faith with the other Canadian provinces and territories, as a result of the Supreme Court of Canada interpreting provisions of the civil code and precedent in the common law provinces such that they converge. One such duty is that of honest contractual performance. This duty requires parties to a contract to act in good faith and with honesty in exercising their rights under a contract and in delivering their obligations under a contract. This duty prohibits parties to a contract from "[lying] or otherwise knowingly mislead[ing] each other about matters directly linked to the performance of the contract". In Quebec, it is rooted in articles 6 and 7 of the Civil Code which provide that "every person is bound to exercise his civil rights in accordance with the requirements of good faith" and that "no right may be exercised with the intent of injuring another or in an excessive and unreasonable manner, and therefore contrary to the requirements of good faith". The other such duty is that to negotiate in good faith, grounded in article 1375 of the Civil Code which provides that parties to a contract must act in good faith not only at the time an obligation is performed but also "at the time the obligation arises". Circumstances giving rise to this duty include: negotiations between franchisors and franchisees, insurers and insured parties, contracts pertaining to marriages and separation agreements, invitations to tender, and fiduciary relationships. With regard to invitations to tender, this duty is applied in the form of the uniquely Canadian Contract A doctrine.

In Quebec contract law, there are a variety of nominate contracts for which the civil code makes special provision. These include contracts for the sale of goods, the sale of immovable property, gifts, and a variety of contracts described by the civil code as being similar in nature to contracts for sale. Furthermore, the rules regarding contracts for the international sale of goods are harmonised as a result of Canada's membership in the United Nations convention

==== Roman-Dutch contract law ====
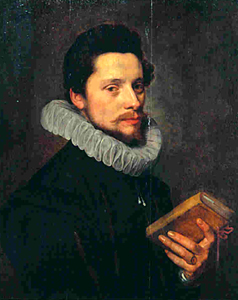
Hugo Grotius, one of the jurists credited with the development of Roman-Dutch law

The Roman-Dutch law of contract is based on canon and natural laws. Adopting the canonist position, all contracts were said to be an exchange of promises that were consensual and bonae fidei, that is, based simply on mutual assent and good faith. Taking the Christian view that it is a sin to break one's promise, canon lawyers developed the pacta sunt servanda principle under which all serious agreements ought to be enforced, regardless of whether there had been compliance with strict formalities as prescribed by secular law. Under the causa theory, for the contract to be binding it had to have a iusta causa, or lawful motive in line with Christian moral imperatives, arising not only from a lawful or just right, title, or cause of action, but also from love and affection, moral consideration, or past services. A nudum pactum was redefined as any agreement unenforceable for lack of causa. All of these principles were applied uniformly through European ecclesiastical courts.

In keeping with Enlightenment values, natural lawyers stripped away the Christian morality from contract law. They redefined a contract as a concurrence of wills, and each party's "promise" was now seen as a declaration of will devoid of moral obligation (will theory). In place of iusta causa developed a general principle of binding force under which any valid contract was both binding and actionable. Canonist substantive fairness shifted to procedural fairness, so good faith and mutual assent were retained as requirements, but just price and laesio enormis were not. In African states which were previously under English or South African rule, public policy was substituted for bonos mores, though this shift did not affect other Roman-Dutch law jurisdictions.

In jurisdictions following Roman-Dutch Law, including mixed systems in South Africa and neighbouring countries in which contract law continues to adhere to Roman-Dutch tradition, the following requirements must be met for a contract to be considered valid:

1. There must be consensus ad idem between the contracting parties.
2. The parties must have seriously intended the agreement to result in terms which can be enforced.
3. The parties must have the capacity to contract.
4. The agreement must have certain and definite terms.
5. The necessary formalities must be observed.
6. The agreement must be lawful.
7. The contractual obligations must be possible of performance.
8. The content of the agreement must be certain.

In such jurisdictions, a contract has certain characteristic features:

- It can be unilateral, i.e. one party has a duty to perform, or bilateral or multilateral, i.e. both parties have a duty to perform.
- It is an obligationary agreement. It entails undertakings or forbearances, on one or both sides, to tender certain performances: that is, to give (dare), to do (facere) or not to do (non-facere). Alternatively, it may be a warranty that a certain state of affairs exists.
- If bilateral, it is usually synallagmatic (or reciprocal), meaning that one party's performance is promised in exchange for the performance of the other party.

The modern concept of contract is generalised so that an agreement does not have to conform to a specific type to be enforced, but contracting parties are required to conduct their relationship in good faith (bona fides).

==== Scots contract law ====
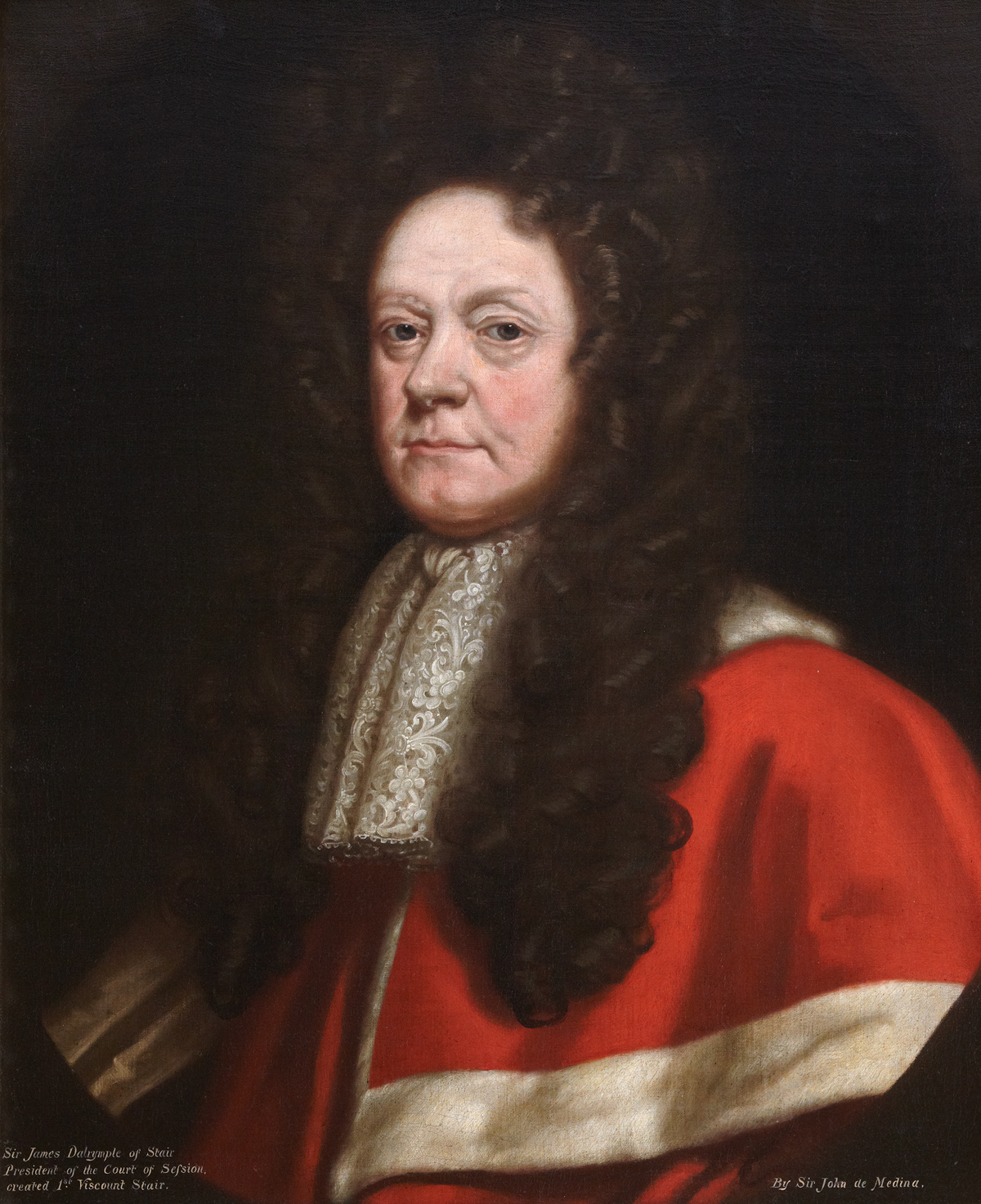
James Dalrymple, 1st Viscount of Stair, an early jurist credited with developing Scots law on the basis of " the civil, canon and feudal laws; and with the customs of neighbouring nations"

Under Scots law, a contract is created by bilateral agreement and should be distinguished from a unilateral promise, the latter being recognised as a distinct and enforceable species of obligation in Scots Law. Scots contract law is related to Roman-Dutch contract law owing to the influence of Dutch and Flemish merchants and scholarship on Scots jurisprudence prior to the Act of Union 1707, and similarly arose through a process of judicial and scholarly development based on Scottish and continental European interpretations of classical Roman contract law. Consequently, in order for a contract to be valid under Scots law the following requirements must be met for a contract to be considered valid:

1. There must be consensus ad idem between the contracting parties.
2. The parties must have seriously intended the agreement to result in terms which can be enforced.
3. The parties must have the capacity to contract.
4. The agreement must have certain and definite terms.
5. The necessary formalities must be observed.
6. The agreement must be lawful.
7. The contractual obligations must be possible of performance.
8. The content of the agreement must be certain.

As in most systems of contract law, a contract is formed by the acceptance of an offer, and an offer can be constituted by responding to an invitation to treat. While there is no requirement for consideration in Scots contract law, a distinction is made between "gratuitous" contracts which only impose obligations upon one party and "onerous" contracts in which each party undertakes obligations toward the other, with the distinction only being relevant in instances where one party's failure to deliver on its obligations excuses or limits the obligations of the other party.

Scots contract law has also been supplemented and modified by legislation seeking to modernise jurisprudence. For example, the Contract (Scotland) Act 1997 codifies the parol evidence rule in Scots contract law by providing that where a written document appears to comprise all the terms of a contract, it shall be presumed to do so except where the contrary is proved and by further providing that a document which expressly states that it comprises all the terms of a contract is conclusively presumed to do so. The act also alters Scots contract law to enable a buyer to seek damages for breach of contract under a contract of sale from the seller without being required to reject the goods or rescind the contract as was previously the case. For example, while a contractual promise historically had to be proved by writ or oath, the Requirements of Writing (Scotland) Act 1995 provided that a promise need only be evidenced in writing for the creation, transfer, variation or extinction of a real right in land (s 1(2) (a)(i) of Requirements of Writing (Scotland) Act 1995) and for a gratuitous unilateral obligation other than one undertaken in the course of business (s 1(2)(a)(ii) of Requirements of Writing (Scotland) Act 1995.) (Note: This section has caused great debate amongst academics as to the meanings of "unilateral" and "gratuitous". Some believe that the inclusion of the two terms in this section points to a desire of the drafters that they be given different meanings. This would allow some promises to be unilateral but not gratuitous. This argument was particularly discussed by both Martin Hogg (University of Edinburgh) and Joe Thomson (University of Glasgow) in articles for the Scots Law Times (News) in 1998 and 1997 respectively.)

Rules concerning the creation of third-party rights in Scots contract law are codified in the Contract (Third Party Rights) (Scotland) Act 2017, which provides that a third-party right comes into existence where a "contract contains an undertaking that one or more of the contracting parties will do, or not do, something for the [third-party]'s benefit" and the parties to the contract intended that "the [third-party] should be legally entitled to enforce or otherwise invoke the undertaking". The act specifically provides that a third-party does not have to be in existence or fall within the category of persons specified by the right at the time of the right's creation. Furthermore, it makes provisions for the enforcement of rights by third-parties and, while it allows for the parties to a contract to modify or rescind the third-party right, it codifies protections for third-parties who have acted in reliance on such a right or have provided notice of their acceptance to the promisor of the right.

=== Modern civil- and mixed-law jurisdictions ===
==== Chinese contract law ====
There are four distinct systems of contract law presently in force in China, three of which are in force in different regions administered by the People's Republic of China and one of which is in force in Taiwan. (Note: Areas administered by the Republic of China include: Taiwan (Chinese: 台灣); Penghu (Chinese: 澎湖); Kinmen (Chinese: 金門; pinyin: Jīnmén); Matsu Islands (Chinese: 馬祖列島; pinyin: Mǎzǔ Lièdǎo); Other nearby islands) In the People's Republic: Hong Kong is a common law jurisdiction whose contract law is largely identical to the pre-1997 contract law of England and Wales; Macau operates under a distinct framework modelled after Portuguese civil law; and contract law in the Mainland is governed by the 2021 Civil Code of the People's Republic of China. By contrast, contract law in all areas of the Republic of China are governed by the Taiwan Civil Code which was originally modelled after the Japanese Six Codes system, itself primarily based on the German pandectist approach to law.

===== Taiwan =====
Taiwanese contract law is governed by its civil code, which was originally enacted in 1929 and has developed over the following century. A contract under the Taiwan Civil Code is a type of juridical act, divided into three components: object (i.e. the purpose of a contract), behavioural ability (i.e. disposition of obligations), and manifestation of intent (i.e. meeting of the minds). The Civil Code provides that a juridical act is only valid if it does not violate an imperative or prohibitive provision or public policy, and if it complies with legal requirements as to form. A contract is considered to have been concluded validly if the contracting parties agree on its essential conditions and, where agreement is lacking on non-essential conditions, courts are empowered to make such provision as they deem equitable. While the formation of a contract generally requires offer and acceptance, the acceptance does not need to be in the form of a notice if one does not appear necessary in light of the nature of the agreement or applicable customs; in such circumstances, there is implied acceptance when the offeree's conduct or actions indicate acceptance, and the contract is therefore construed to have been validly formed.

===== People's Republic of China =====
Under the Civil Code of the People's Republic of China, "the parties may conclude a contract by making an offer and acceptance or through other means". An offer is defined as "an expression of intent to conclude a contract with another person" and is required to "be specific and definite" and to expressly indicate that "the offeror is to be bound by his expression of intent upon acceptance thereof by an offeree". The code further provides that an offer may be revoked unless "the offeror has explicitly indicated that the offer is irrevocable by specifying a time limit for acceptance or in any other manner" or "the offeree has reasons to believe that the offer is irrevocable and has made reasonable preparations for performing the contract". An acceptance, defined as "an expression of intent of the offeree to accept the offer" and a contract is legally formed when the acceptance becomes effective under the provisions of the code. Consequently, the formation of a contract under mainland Chinese law is governed by the mutual assent principle but is subject to the additional criterion that a valid offer expressly state that it is irrevocable.

Based on the common law concept of an invitation to treat, mainland Chinese law recognises the notion of an invitation to offer. An invitation to offer is defined as "a manifestation that a person expects another person to make an offer" and the code specifically provides that "Auction announcements, bidding announcements, stock prospectuses, bond prospectuses, fund prospectuses, commercial advertisements and promotions, mailed price catalogs, and the like, are invitations to offer" and that "commercial advertisement and promotion constitute an offer if their content satisfies the conditions for an offer".

Mainland Chinese law takes a liberal approach to the manner in which a contract is recorded, with the civil code providing that "parties may conclude a contract in writing, (Note: Defined as "any form that renders the content contained therein capable of being represented in a tangible form, such as a written agreement, letter, telegram, telex, facsimile, or the like") orally, or in other forms" and that "a data message in any form...that renders the content contained therein capable of being represented in a tangible form and accessible for reference and use at any time is deemed as a writing." Nevertheless, the code provides for specific requirements as to the contents of a contract. (Note: "The content of a contract shall be agreed by the parties and generally includes the following clauses: (1) name or entity name and domicile of each party; (2) objects; (3) quantity; (4) quality; (5) price or remuneration; (6) period, place, and manner of performance; (7) default liability; and (8) the means of dispute resolution. The parties may consult with the various types of model contracts when concluding a contract.") Government procurement law in China prescribes that the republic's contract law applies in the field of public procurement and that contracts are to be made in writing.

Under the Taiwan Civil Code, a contract purportedly entered into by an incapable person (incapax) for any reason is void unless ratified by the person's guardian or conservator. Only an incapax’s lawful guardian or conservator may assent to a juridical act on the incapax’s behalf. Additionally, where an incapax fraudulently deceives the other party into believing that the first party had capacity to enter a contract, the contract is valid despite such incapacity.

==== South Korean contract law ====
For a contract to be valid and enforceable in South Korea, the agreement between the parties must be based on "mutual consent". As in common law jurisdictions, the first element of a valid and enforceable contract is an offer. In South Korea, as in much of the world, the offer must be a specific and detailed expression of the offer. Acceptance of the offer, without modifications or caveats is deemed an acceptance of the contract and, thus, a valid and enforceable contract between the parties.

==== Japanese contract law ====
Japanese contract law forms a distinct branch within the broader world of civil law jurisprudence, initially derived primarily from German jurisprudence adopted in the aftermath of the Meiji Restoration. While the basic rules of Japanese contract law are prescribed in the Japanese Civil Code (together with the rules underpinning other areas of private law, including tort and family law), more detailed rules concerning commercial contracts are prescribed in the Japanese Commercial Code. A contract under Japanese law is formed by way of offer and acceptance as in most jurisdictions; however, a written document is not a prerequisite for the existence of a contract, which comes into being based on the principle of consensualism. Under Japanese contract law, alignment between the intentions of the parties to a contract is thus considered vital and contracts may be voided depending on the circumstances where a party conceals its true intentions, intentionally or fraudulently manifests false intentions, mistakenly manifests false intentions, or is coerced into manifesting false intentions. Contracts which violate mandatory prescriptions of law, as well as contracts which violate public policy, may be deemed void ab initio to the extent of the violation.

Japanese contract law recognises the existence of pre-contractual and post-contractual obligations. With regard to pre-contractual obligations, a party to a contract which is ultimately impossible to perform or void may be liable for negligence in concluding the contract if another party relied upon their representations and consequently suffered pecuniary or other material damages. Another distinct area of pre-contractual obligation pertains to experts' obligation to explain complicated contracts to consumers, with complex financial contracts being a key example of this. Post-contractual obligations frequently recognised under Japanese contract law include obligations regarding confidentiality and non-competition, which may be defined by the contract itself, implied for reasons of public policy, or provided for by non-derogable statutory law.

The Japanese Civil Code provides for a variety of nominate contracts similar to those prescribed in other civil law jurisdictions; including contracts for sale, gifts, leases, loans, and the provision of services. These nominate contracts are subject to specific rules and warranties mandated by the code in order to protect the rights of the contracting parties, particularly those with lesser negotiating power. Additionally, nominate contracts for the formation of partnerships and associations govern the establishment of these categories of legal persons and there are special provisions governing third party beneficiary contracts. Rules governing the performance of contracts, set-off, assignment, and the seizure of defaulting obligors' assets are also provided by the Japanese Civil Code.

Contract law in Japan, despite the civil law origins of its civil code, is heavily shaped by traditional Japanese attitudes toward business and obligations. For example, under the Japanese Commercial Code, a merchant trader who receives an offer from a regular client that falls within one of their areas of business is expected to respond without undue delay and, if they fail to do so, they are presumed to have accepted the contract. This can be seen as an illustration of a Japanese approach to commerce and contract law rooted in notions of honouring relationships. This is significant since, owing to the German roots of the Japanese Civil Code; once a contract becomes effective as between the parties, it is not freely revocable. Japanese judges, interpreting the obligation of good faith contained in the Japanese Civil Code as codifying this notion of honour-bound relationship in commerce, tend to deny both the termination of pre-contractual negotiations and the non-renewal of existing contractual relations.

==== Philippine contract law ====
The Philippines is a mixed law jurisdiction, shaped primarily by Spanish civil law and American common law as codified in the Philippine Civil Code. The Philippine Civil Code defines a contract as "a meeting of minds between two persons whereby one binds himself, with respect to the other, to give something or to render some service". Parties to an innominate contract have a high degree of contractual freedom and "may establish such stipulations, clauses, terms and conditions as they may deem convenient" only subject to the requirement that "they are not contrary to law, morals, good customs, public order, or public policy". A contract under Philippine law is only valid if it is binding upon both parties and, as such, a contract whose associated obligations are subject to one party's discretion is invalid. If a contract contains a provision benefitting a third-party beneficiary, the beneficiary may compel its performance provided that they communicated their assent to the promissor before any attempt by the latter to revoke or alter the benefit pursuant to the contract. Except where a provision of law requires that a contract take a particular form, a contract is binding regardless of the form it takes. In order for a contract to exist, the following criteria must be met:

- Both contracting parties must consent. (Note: "Consent is manifested by the meeting of the offer and the acceptance upon the thing and the cause which are to constitute the contract. The offer must be certain and the acceptance absolute. A qualified acceptance constitutes a counter-offer." (Article 1319))
- The object of the contract must be certain (i.e. it must pertain to ascertainable categories of obligations) (Note: All things which are not outside the commerce of men, including future things, may be the object of a contract. All rights which are not intransmissible may also be the object of contracts... All services which are not contrary to law, morals, good customs, public order or public policy may likewise be the object of a contract (Article 1347))
- The cause (i.e. purpose) of the obligation must be established (Note: "In onerous contracts the cause is understood to be, for each contracting party, the prestation or promise of a thing or service by the other; in remuneratory ones, the service or benefit which is remunerated; and in contracts of pure beneficence, the mere liberality of the benefactor" (Article 1350))

Where a written instrument purporting to embody a contract does not adequately represent the true intention of the parties due to mistake, fraud, inequitable conduct, or accident; any party may seek reformation. Where one party was mistaken and the other either acted fraudulently or inequitably, or was aware of the defect in the instrument, the first party may seek reformation. Additionally, reformation may be sought where the defect in the document is caused by "ignorance, lack of skill, negligence, or bad faith on the part of the person drafting the instrument". The Supreme Court has the authority to determine the rules governing reformation under its Rules of Court. A party who takes legal action to enforce a contract is estopped from seeking reformation.

Valid contracts may only be rescinded in cases provided for by law. This includes fraudulent conveyances as well as contracts concluded by an individual's guardian or agent if an individual suffers lesion by more than one quarter of the value of the assets or services alienated, contracts alienating assets subject to litigation without the consent of the litigants, and other categories of contract expressly designated by statute. Rescission may not be sought except where it is the only means by which a party can obtain reparation for the damages caused to them by the contract and is only permitted to the extent necessary to cover such damages. Under Philippine law, rescission creates an obligation to return anything that was the object of the contract as well as any profit derived therefrom, and rescission is consequently available only where the party seeking the remedy is able to return or provide reparation for such things. Additionally, rescission is prohibited where the items that are the object of the contract are in the possession of a holder in due course who acted in good faith. Aside from rescission, a contract under Philippine law may be voided where a party did not possess the capacity to consent or where the consent was given due to mistake, violence, intimidation, undue influence, or fraud.

Certain contracts under Philippine law, while valid, are unenforceable unless ratified. This includes contracts concluded by an agent who acted without or beyond authority, contracts where both parties lack capacity to consent, and contracts that violate the Statute of Frauds as applicable under the Philippine Civil Code. Additionally, a contract is void ab initio if its cause, object, or purpose is contrary to law, morals, good customs, public order or public policy; it is absolutely simulated or fictitious; its cause or object did not exist when it was concluded, is impossible, or is "outside the commerce of men"; the intention of the parties cannot be determined; or it is expressly prohibited or declared void by law. A contract that is void ab initio may not be ratified.

Philippine contract law takes a middle ground between the common law and civil law approaches to liquidated damages or penalty clauses. While such provisions are lawful and enforceable, a court may reduce such damages if it finds their effect to be iniquitous or unconscionable. Additionally, if the breach of contract litigated is one that was not contemplated by the parties when the contract was concluded (e.g. force majeure), the appropriate level of damages will be determined by the court without regard to the provision.

==== Swiss contract law ====
In Swiss law, which also forms the basis for the Turkish civil code, contracts are defined by article 1 of the Code of Obligations : "a contract is formed when the parties have, reciprocally and in a concordant manner, expressed their intention to form a contract". As in other continental civil law jurisdictions, contracts under Swiss law are thus formed by the exchange of at least two expressions of intent, an offer and an acceptance, per which the parties agree to enter into legal relations. The Code of Obligations, adopted in 1911, consists of two categories of rules governing contracts:

- General rules, which are applicable to all categories of contracts and are outlined in articles 1 through 39 of the code; and
- Special rules, which are applicable to specific types of nominate contracts.

Aside from the rules specified in the Code of Obligations, the Swiss Civil Code contains separate provisions governing contracts of marriage and inheritance while separate enactments govern contracts concerning private insurance, consumer credit, and travel packages.

=== Islamic law ===
While the majority of Muslim-majority jurisdictions primarily use civil or common law for most aspects of contemporary contract law, Islamic law regarding contracts remains relevant in the area of marriage law and Islamic finance. There are differences between the criteria for formation of contracts under Islamic law and criteria under civil and common law. For example, Sharia classically recognises only natural persons, and never developed the concept of a legal person, or corporation, i.e., a legal entity that limits the liabilities of its managers, shareholders, and employees; exists beyond the lifetimes of its founders; and that can own assets, sign contracts, and appear in court through representatives. Additionally, a contract under Islamic law may be voided for gharar (i.e. speculation and uncertainty) and riba (i.e. usury).

Islamic marriages are typically solemnised as a written financial contract, typically in the presence of two Muslim male witnesses, and it may include a brideprice (Mahr) payable from a Muslim man to a Muslim woman. The brideprice is considered by a Sharia court as a form of debt. Written contracts were traditionally considered paramount in Sharia courts in the matters of dispute that are debt-related, which includes marriage contracts. In Singapore, the contract-based Islamic marriage law is governed by the Administration of Muslim Law Act and coexists with the secular system of marriage registration established under the Women's Charter. Meanwhile, in India, Muslim personal law is a distinct branch of law governed by a variety of statutes and Islamic customs that vary from community to community.

In contemporary Islamic finance and banking, a variety of nominate contracts are used to comply with the Islamic prohibition on gharar and riba. These include profit and loss sharing contracts such as Mudarabah, Musharakah, and Diminishing Musharaka; as well as a variety of asset-backed contracts. The most common contract used in modern Islamic finance is the Murabaha, which was originally a term of fiqh for a sales contract in which the buyer and seller agree on the markup (profit) or "cost-plus" price for the item(s) being sold. In recent decades it has become a term for a very common form of Islamic (i.e., "shariah compliant") financing, where the price is marked up in exchange for allowing the buyer to pay over time—for example with monthly payments (a contract with deferred payment being known as bai-muajjal).

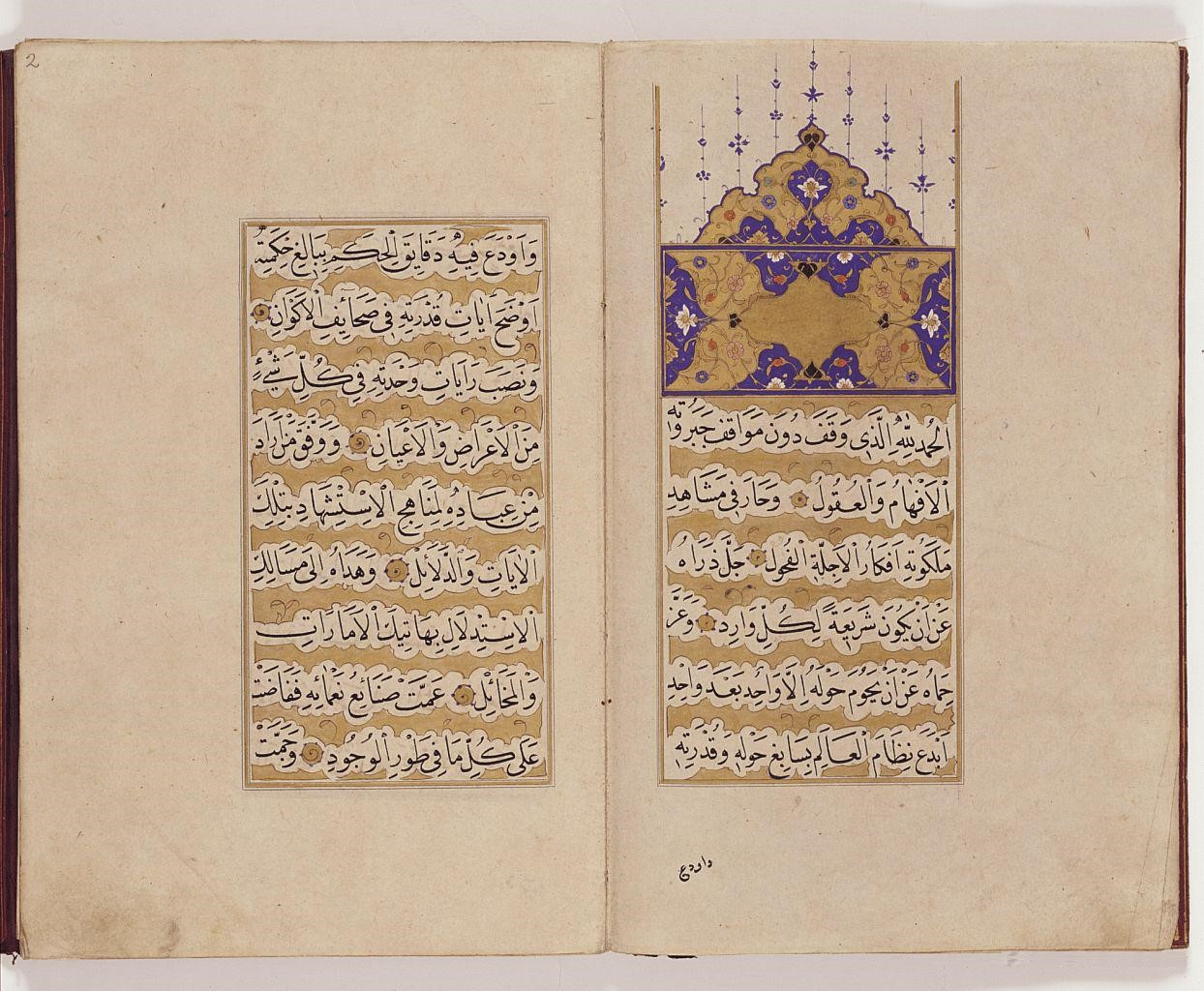
Endowment Charter (Waqfiyya) of Hürrem Sultan, a contract establishing a valid waqf

Additionally, Islamic law imposes several legal conditions on the process of establishing a waqf, a type of patrimony of affectation similar to a trust. A waqf is a contract, therefore the founder (called al-wāqif or al-muḥabbis in Arabic) must be of the capacity to enter into a contract. For this the founder must:

- be an adult
- be sound of mind
- capable of handling financial affairs
- not an undischarged bankrupt

Although waqf is an Islamic institution, being a Muslim is not required to establish a waqf, and non-Muslims may establish a waqf. Finally if a person is fatally ill, the waqf is subject to the same restrictions as a will in Islam. Furthermore, the property (called al-mawqūf or al-muḥabbas) used to found a waqf must be objects of a valid contract. The objects should not themselves be haram (e.g. wine or pork). These objects should not already be in the public domain: public property cannot be used to establish a waqf. The founder cannot also have pledged the property previously to someone else. These conditions are generally true for contracts in Islam. The beneficiaries of the waqf can be persons and public utilities. The founder can specify which persons are eligible for benefit (such the founder's family, entire community, only the poor, travelers). Public utilities such as mosques, schools, bridges, graveyards and drinking fountains can be the beneficiaries of a waqf. Modern legislation divides the waqf as "charitable causes", in which the beneficiaries are the public or the poor) and "family" waqf, in which the founder makes the beneficiaries his relatives. There can also be multiple beneficiaries. For example, the founder may stipulate that half the proceeds go to their family, while the other half go to the poor. Valid beneficiaries must satisfy the following conditions:

- They must be identifiable. While most schools of Islamic jurisprudence require that least some of the beneficiaries must also exist at the time of the founding of the waqf, the Mālikīs hold that a waqf may exist for some time without beneficiaries, whence the proceeds accumulate are given to beneficiaries once they come into existence. An example of a non-existent beneficiary is an unborn child.
- The beneficiaries must not be at war with the Muslims but are not, themselves, required to be Muslim.
- The beneficiaries may not use the waqf for a purpose in contradiction of Islamic principles.

A waqf's declaration of founding is usually a written document, accompanied by a verbal declaration, though neither are required by most scholars. Whatever the declaration, most scholars (Note: those of the Hanafi, Shafi'i, some of the Hanbali, and the Imami Shi'a schools) hold that it is not binding and irrevocable until actually delivered to the beneficiaries or put in their use. Once in their use, however, the waqf becomes an institution in its own right. Under Singaporean law, every mosque is required to be created and administered as a waqf, and rules governing waqfs are prescribed in the Administration of Muslim Law Act.

=== Convention on Contracts for the International Sale of Goods ===
In the vast majority of jurisdictions, the Convention on Contracts for the International Sale of Goods (CISG) governs contracts concerning the international sale of goods. The CISG facilitates international trade by removing legal barriers among state parties (known as "Contracting States") and providing uniform rules that govern most aspects of a commercial transactions, such as contract formation, the means of delivery, parties' obligations, and remedies for breach of contract. Unless expressly excluded by the contract, the convention is automatically incorporated into the domestic laws of Contracting States. Consequently, the criteria for the creation of contracts for the international sale of goods are substantially harmonised among civil, common, and mixed-law jurisdictions around the world.

The CISG applies to contracts of the sale of goods between parties whose places of business are in different States, when the States are Contracting States (United Nations Convention on Contracts for the International Sale of Goods, Article 1(1)(a)). Given the significant number of Contracting States, this is the usual path to the CISG's applicability. The CISG also applies if the parties are situated in different countries (which need not be Contracting States) and the conflict of law rules lead to the application of the law of a Contracting State. For example, a contract between a Japanese trader and a Brazilian trader may contain a clause that arbitration will be in Sydney under Australian law with the consequence that the CISG would apply. A number of States have declared they will not be bound by this condition. The CISG is intended to apply to commercial goods and products only. With some limited exceptions, it does not apply to personal, family, or household goods, nor does it apply to auctions, ships, aircraft, or intangibles and services. The position of computer software is "controversial" and will depend upon various conditions and situations. Importantly, parties to a contract may exclude or vary the application of the CISG.

Under the CISG, an offer to contract must be addressed to a person, be sufficiently definite – that is, describe the goods, quantity, and price – and indicate an intention for the offeror to be bound on acceptance. The CISG does not appear to recognise common law unilateral contracts but, subject to clear indication by the offeror, treats any proposal not addressed to a specific person as only an invitation to make an offer. Further, where there is no explicit price or procedure to implicitly determine price, then the parties are assumed to have agreed upon a price based upon that "generally charged at the time of the conclusion of the contract for such goods sold under comparable circumstances". Generally, an offer may be revoked provided the withdrawal reaches the offeree before or at the same time as the offer, or before the offeree has sent an acceptance. Some offers may not be revoked; for example when the offeree reasonably relied upon the offer as being irrevocable. The CISG requires a positive act to indicate acceptance; silence or inactivity are not an acceptance.

The CISG attempts to resolve the common situation where an offeree's reply to an offer accepts the original offer, but attempts to change the conditions. The CISG says that any change to the original conditions is a rejection of the offer—it is a counter-offer—unless the modified terms do not materially alter the terms of the offer. Changes to price, payment, quality, quantity, delivery, liability of the parties, and arbitration conditions may all materially alter the terms of the offer.

== Contracts across jurisdictions ==
Notably, unlike common-law jurisdictions, civil- and mixed-law jurisdictions do not require consideration for a contract to be binding. In systems based on the Napoleonic Code (including Québec and Saint Lucia whose law of obligations is based on the Civil Code of Lower Canada, as well as Arab jurisdictions whose legal systems are based on the Egyptian Civil Code), an ordinary contract is said to be formed simply on the basis of a "meeting of the minds" or a "concurrence of wills". The Law of Germany, while also rooted in the "meeting of the minds" principle, follows the 'abstraction principle' with regard to both personal and real property. The principle outlines that the personal obligation of contract forms separately from the title of property being conferred. When contracts are invalidated for some reason under German law, the contractual obligation to pay can be invalidated separately from the proprietary title of the property. Unjust enrichment law, rather than contract law, is then used to restore title to the rightful owner.

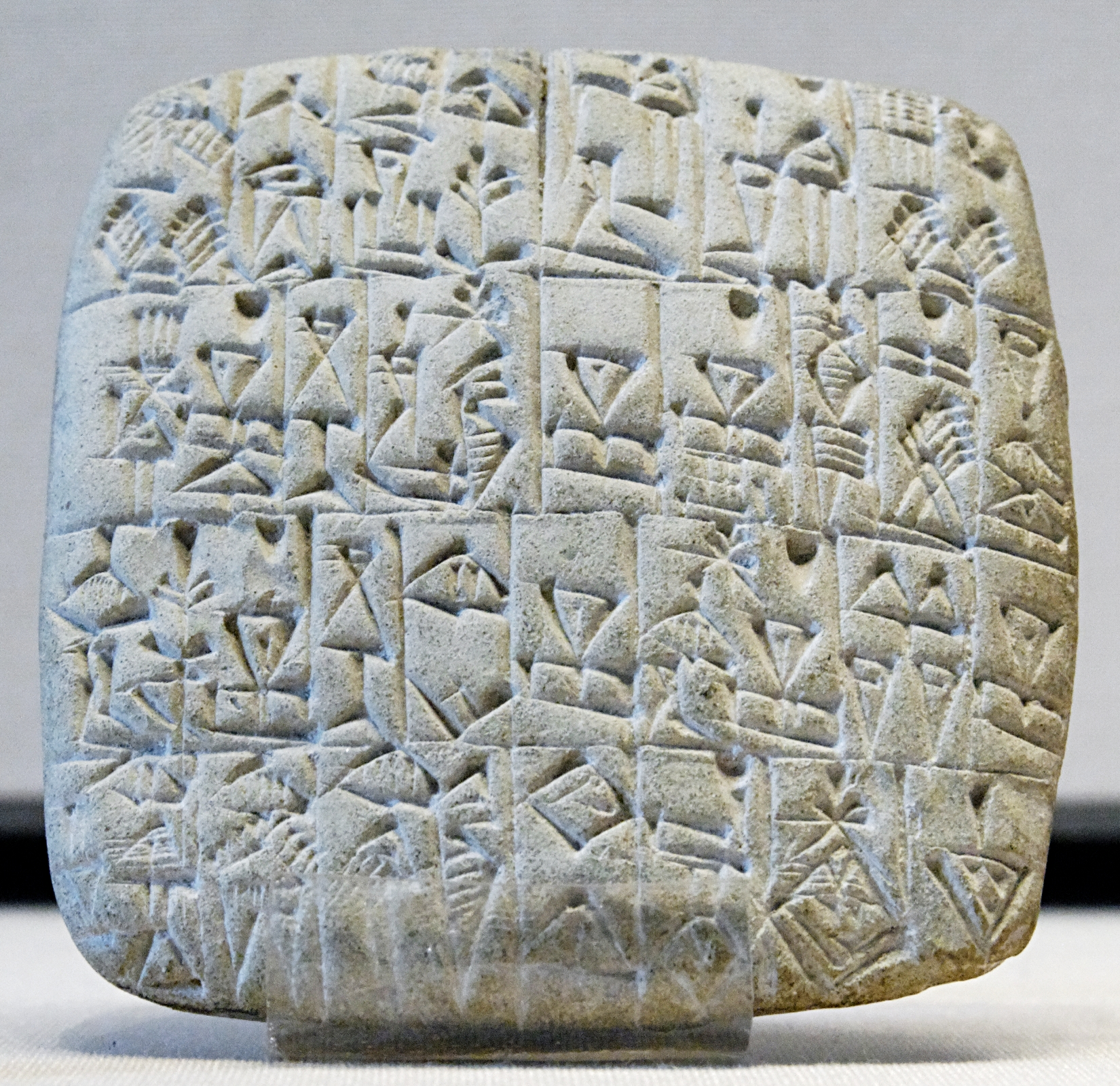
Bill of sale of a male slave and a building in Shuruppak, Sumerian tablet, c. 2600 BC

Civil law jurisdictions based on the Napoleonic Code or the Bürgerliches Gesetzbuch provide for a more interventionist role for the state in both the formation and enforcement of contracts than in common law jurisdictions or Scots law, Roman-Dutch law, and other civil- or mixed-law jurisdictions. Such systems incorporate more terms implied by law into contracts, allow greater latitude for courts to interpret and revise contract terms, and impose a stronger duty of good faith.

Common law jurisdictions are often associated with a high degree of freedom of contract. One example of the supposedly greater freedom of contract in American law, is the 1901 case of Hurley v. Eddingfield in which a physician was permitted to deny treatment to a patient despite the lack of other available medical assistance and the patient's subsequent death. In civil law jurisdictions rooted in the French or German tradition, nominate contracts are regulated in order to prevent unfair terms. The law of obligations typically includes a duty to rescue which would make cases such as Hurley v. Eddingfield far less likely. Conversely, civil law jurisdictions are more likely to enforce penalty clauses and provide for the specific performance of contracts than their common law counterparts, which typically refuse to recognise clauses providing for damages greater than that required to adequately compensate the plaintiff.

While the majority of common law jurisdictions continue to rely on precedent and unmodified principles to determine issues under contract law, a significant minority of common law jurisdictions have enacted statutes governing contract law. Contract law in New Zealand is governed by the Contract and Commercial Law Act 2017, which comprehensively outlines rules regarding contracts and related areas of law. Notably, contract law in India, the most populous common law jurisdiction, is codified in the Indian Contract Act, 1872, which comprehensively outlines issues of contract law, versions of which remaining in force in Pakistan and Bangladesh. Although not a comprehensive code, the Singaporean Civil Law Act 1909 makes several provisions regarding contract law in Singapore. In America, the Uniform Commercial Code codifies several provisions of commercial law, including the law of contracts.

=== Assignment ===
While a party may typically assign monetary rights at their discretion provided that they notify the other party to the contract in a timely manner, most jurisdictions impose limitations on the ability of a party to assign non-monetary rights or to assign obligations they owe to the other party. In common law jurisdictions, an assignment may not transfer a duty, burden, or detriment without the express agreement of the assignee. The right or benefit being assigned may be a gift (such as a waiver) or it may be paid for with a contractual consideration such as money. Under Mainland Chinese law, a party to a contract may assign their rights "in whole or in part to a third person" except to the extent that a right is "not assignable by virtue of its nature", "in accordance with law", or due to the agreement between the parties. In the United States, there are various laws that limit the liability of an assignee, often to facilitate credit, as assignees are typically lenders. (Note: Notable examples include a provision in the Truth in Lending Act and provisions in the Consumer Leasing Act and the Home Ownership Equity Protection Act.) In certain cases, the contract may be a negotiable instrument in which the person receiving the instrument may become a holder in due course, which is similar to an assignee except that issues, such as lack of performance, by the assignor may not be a valid defence for the obligor. In the United States, the Federal Trade Commission promulgated Rule 433, formally known as the "Trade Regulation Rule Concerning Preservation of Consumers' Claims and Defences", which "effectively abolished the [holder in due course] doctrine in consumer credit transactions". In 2012, the commission reaffirmed the regulation.

=== Procedure and choice of law ===
In both civil and common law jurisdictions, where no arbitration or mediation clause or agreement applies, a party seeking a remedy for breach of contract is typically required to file a civil (non-criminal) lawsuit in the court which has jurisdiction over the contract. Where the courts of England and Wales, Singapore, India, or another common law jurisdiction within the Commonwealth have jurisdiction, a contract may be enforced by use of a claim, or in urgent cases by applying for an interim injunction to prevent a breach. Similarly, in the United States, an aggrieved party may apply for injunctive relief to prevent a threatened breach of contract, where such breach would result in irreparable harm that could not be adequately remedied by money damages.

When a contract dispute arises between parties that are in different jurisdictions, law that is applicable to a contract is dependent on the conflict of laws analysis by the court where the breach of contract action is filed. In the absence of a choice of law clause, the court will normally apply either the law of the forum or the law of the jurisdiction that has the strongest connection to the subject matter of the contract. A choice of law clause allows the parties to agree in advance that their contract will be interpreted under the laws of a specific jurisdiction.

Within the United States, choice of law clauses are generally enforceable, although exceptions based upon public policy may at times apply. Within the European Union, even when the parties have negotiated a choice of law clause, conflict of law issues may be governed by the Rome I Regulation.

=== Forum selection clauses ===
Commercial contracts, particularly those in which parties are located in different jurisdictions, frequently contain forum selection clauses which may be arbitration, mediation, or choice of court clauses depending on the contract in question.

==== Choice of court ====
Many contracts contain an exclusive choice of court agreement, setting out the jurisdiction in whose courts disputes in relation to the contract should be litigated. The clause may be general, requiring that any case arising from the contract be filed within a specific jurisdiction, or it may require that a case be filed in a specific court. For example, a choice of court clause may require that a case be filed in a Singaporean court, or it may require more specifically that the case be filed in the Singapore International Commercial Court.

Typically, either the doctrine of freedom of contract or multilateral instruments require non-chosen courts to dismiss cases and require the recognition of judgments made by courts designated by exclusive choice of court agreements. For example, the Brussels regime instruments (31 European states) and the Hague Choice of Court Agreements Convention (European Union, Mexico, Montenegro, Singapore), as well as several instruments related to a specific area of law, may require courts to enforce and recognise choice of law clauses and foreign judgments.

Under the Hague Choice of Court Agreements Convention, a court designated by an exclusive choice of court agreement has jurisdiction unless the contract is void under its domestic law and cannot decline to exercise jurisdiction on the grounds that another jurisdiction's court is a more appropriate venue. Similarly a non-chosen court is required to refuse jurisdiction except where the agreement is null and void under the law of the chosen court, a party to the contract lacked capacity under the non-chosen court's domestic law, giving effect to the agreement would lead to a manifest injustice or would be manifestly contrary to the public policy of the non-chosen court's state, the agreement cannot be performed due to force majeure, or the chosen court has chosen not to hear the case. Exclusive choice of court agreements under the Hague Choice of Court Agreements Convention solely apply to commercial matters and thus do not apply to any party dealing as a consumer, employment contracts or collective bargaining agreements, matters related to civil status or family law, or similar scenarios.

In jurisdictions that are not party to the Hague Convention, an exclusive choice of court agreement may not necessarily binding upon a court. Based upon an analysis of the laws, rules of procedure and public policy of the state and court in which the case was filed, a court that is identified by the clause may find that it should not exercise jurisdiction, or a court in a different jurisdiction or venue may find that the litigation may proceed despite the clause. As part of that analysis, a court may examine whether the clause conforms with the formal requirements of the jurisdiction in which the case was filed (in some jurisdictions a choice of forum or choice of venue clause only limits the parties if the word "exclusive" is explicitly included in the clause). Some jurisdictions will not accept an action that has no connection to the court that was chosen, and others will not enforce a choice of venue clause when they consider themselves to be a more convenient forum for the litigation.

==== Arbitration ====
If the contract contains a valid arbitration clause, the aggrieved party must submit an arbitration claim in accordance with the procedures set forth in the clause subject to the arbitration law of the jurisdiction designated as the seat of the arbitration. Many international contracts provide that all disputes arising thereunder will be resolved by arbitration rather than litigated in courts. Arbitration judgments may generally be enforced in the same manner as ordinary court judgments, and are recognised and enforceable internationally under the New York Convention, which has 156 parties. However, in New York Convention states, arbitral decisions are generally immune unless there is a showing that the arbitrator's decision was irrational or tainted by fraud.

Some arbitration clauses are not enforceable, and in other cases arbitration may not be sufficient to resolve a legal dispute. For example, except in Singapore, disputes regarding validity of registered IP rights may need to be resolved by a public body within the national registration system. For matters of significant public interest that go beyond the narrow interests of the parties to the agreement, such as claims that a party violated a contract by engaging in illegal anti-competitive conduct or committed civil rights violations, a court might find that the parties may litigate some or all of their claims even before completing a contractually agreed arbitration process.

Most civil law jurisdictions and the majority of common law jurisdictions outside America either limit or prohibit the enforcement of arbitration clauses included in contracts of adhesion. For instance, in the 2020 case Uber Technologies Inc v Heller, the Supreme Court of Canada declared that an arbitration agreement included in contracts concluded by Uber with its drivers was unconscionable and thus unenforceable under the law of Ontario. Similarly the UNCITRAL Model Law on International Commercial Arbitration and legislation based on the model law restrict the applicability of the arbitration framework to commercial arbitration, expressly excluding parties dealing as consumers.

===== United States =====
In the United States, thirty-five states (notably not including New York) and the District of Columbia have adopted the Uniform Arbitration Act to facilitate the enforcement of arbitrated judgments. Unlike the UNCITRAL Model Law, the Uniform Arbitration Act expressly requires a court to confirm an arbitral award before it can be enforced.

Customer claims against securities brokers and dealers are almost always resolved pursuant to contractual arbitration clauses because securities dealers are required under the terms of their membership in self-regulatory organisations such as the Financial Industry Regulatory Authority (formerly the NASD) or NYSE to arbitrate disputes with their customers. The firms then began including arbitration agreements in their customer agreements, requiring their customers to arbitrate disputes.

In addition to arbitration under the Uniform Arbitration Act, the State of Delaware maintains a second arbitration framework known as the Delaware Rapid Arbitration Act (DRAA). The purpose of the DRAA is to provide for a "prompt, cost-effective, and efficient" method for "sophisticated entities" to resolve business disputes. The DRAA accomplishes this through the use of expedited deadlines and financial penalties for arbitrators who fail to rule on disputes within the time allotted under the act.

===== Singapore =====
Presently, Singapore maintains two distinct frameworks under which contractual disputes can be arbitrated, which differ primarily in regard to the extent to which parties to the proceedings may resort to the courts. Under section 45 of the Arbitration Act 2001, either party or the arbitral tribunal itself may apply to the court to issue a ruling on "any question of law arising in the course of the proceedings which the Court is satisfied substantially affects the rights of one or more of the parties" and under section 49, either party may appeal an arbitral award on any question of law unless the parties have expressly excluded appeals the section. Either action is only permitted with the consent of the other parties or either the arbitral tribunal (for rulings on preliminary points of law) or the Court with regard to appeals. This is in contrast to the International Arbitration Act 1994, which generally replicates the provisions of the UNCITRAL Model Law on International Commercial Arbitration and provides more restricted access to the courts.

In 2020, the Singapore Academy of Law published a report on the right of appeal in arbitral proceedings evaluating the advantages and disadvantages of the two distinct frameworks, concluding that the existence of appeals enables the development of case law and consequently provides greater certainty for parties to arbitral proceedings. The report identifies the availability of appeals by default under section 69 of England's Arbitration Act 1996 as a factor contributing to the popularity of London as a seat of arbitration in international contract disputes. Consequently, the report recommends amending the International Arbitration Act 1994 to enable parties to opt for a right of appeal in their arbitration agreement, thus enabling the development of case law and providing greater certainty for parties who desire it while maintaining an absence of appeals as the default position in order to cater to parties who desire a completely extrajudicial resolution of contractual disputes.

Uniquely, both the International Arbitration Act 1994 and the Arbitration Act 2001 contain provisions (Part 2A and Part 9A, respectively) explicitly authorising the arbitration of intellectual property disputes regardless of the extent to which the law of Singapore or any other jurisdiction expressly confers jurisdiction upon any designated body. This contrasts with the general approach taken by the majority of other jurisdictions and enables parties to foreign intellectual property disputes to seek resolution offshore without affecting the recognition of intellectual property rights in the jurisdictions in which they are issued.

==== Mediation and negotiation ====
If a contract contains a valid mediation or negotiation clause, the parties will typically have to comply with the mediation or negotiation procedures specified by the contract before commencing arbitration or litigation. In Emirates Trading Agency Llc v Prime Mineral Exports Private Ltd., an obligation relating to "friendly discussion" acting as the first stage of an agreed approach to resolving disputes was upheld as enforceable.

Mediation is a form of alternative dispute resolution which aims at addressing disputes between two or more parties in an amicable and non-adversarial manner and typically involves a neutral third party (the mediator or conciliator) assisting the parties in reaching a settlement that, depending on the applicable law, may then be registered as an arbitral award or a judicial decision. Typically, courts will stay proceedings where a party successfully asserts the existence of a valid mediation or negotiation agreement. It is generally permitted for an individual appointed as a mediator to serve as an arbitrator as per a hybrid mediation-arbitration clause if the parties are unable to reach a mediated settlement.

Typically, a mediated settlement may be recorded as an order of court in the jurisdiction under whose law it was concluded and the registration of a mediated settlement is sufficient to stay any arbitral or judicial proceedings addressing the same matters. While arbitral awards are typically enforceable in third countries under the New York Convention, mediated settlements in international contractual disputes are enforceable under the Singapore Mediation Convention. A mediated settlement in an international contractual dispute is referred to as an international settlement agreement and, in jurisdictions where the Singapore Convention applies, international settlement agreements entered into in other member states may be registered by a court for domestic enforcement. Additionally, courts in jurisdictions where the convention applies will stay proceedings where satisfied that a valid mediation agreement governed by the law of another state party covers the subject matter of the dispute, and international settlement agreement registered under the convention will be sufficient to preclude the commencement of domestic judicial or arbitral proceedings.

==== Recognition of offshore judgments ====
While arbitral awards and mediated or negotiated settlements are invariably issued on the basis of an arbitration or mediation clause, court decisions are commonly issued in the absence of an exclusive choice of court agreement or even an explicit choice of law agreement from which the courts of another country may infer the legitimacy of the issuing court's jurisdiction. Consequently, most jurisdictions have enacted laws standardising the procedure for the recognition and enforcement of offshore judgments in the absence of an exclusive choice of court agreement. For example, Singapore's Reciprocal Enforcement of Foreign Judgments Act 1959, which only applies to countries the Minister of Law determines are likely to reciprocate, provides that a judgment creditor may apply to the General Division of the High Court to register a foreign judgment for the purpose of enforcement in Singapore. Similarly, the Uniform Foreign Country Money Judgments Recognition Act enacted by the majority of U.S. states and territories provides for the enforcement of judgments from outside America while the Uniform Enforcement of Foreign Judgments Act provides for the enforcement of judgments issued by other U.S. states and territories.

The Hague Judgments Convention of 2019, which has not yet entered into force, provides for a harmonised framework for the recognition of offshore commercial judgments in the absence of a valid forum selection clause. The convention is modelled after The Hague Choice of Court Convention and similarly excludes matters such as family law, the status and capacity of natural persons, insolvency, and matters covered by other conventions (e.g. arbitration, choice of court agreements, nuclear damage liability, intellectual property, the existence of legal persons, etc.). Article 5 of the convention provides that offshore judgments under certain requirements.

== Types of contracts ==
There are various ways in which types of contract may be categorised.

=== Contract theory ===
Contract theory divides contracts into "complete" and "incomplete" contracts, reflecting whether or not the parties to a contract are able to specify their "rights, duties, and remedies under every possible state of the world".

=== Electronic contracts ===
With the rise of the internet and the corresponding emergence of e-commerce and electronic securities trading, electronic contracts have risen to prominence over the first two decades of the twenty first century. Many jurisdictions have passed e-signature laws that have made the electronic contract and signature as legally valid as a paper contract. In Singapore, the Electronic Transactions Act (implementing the United Nations Convention on the Use of Electronic Communications in International Contracts and the UNCITRAL Model Law on Electronic Transferable Records) provides for the validity of electronic records, signatures, and contracts, while additionally prescribing specific criteria for electronic transferable records. In order to promote and simplify the use of electronic contracts and related documents, the act provides for broad recognition of electronic signatures and expressly declares that electronic documents satisfy any legal requirement for a contract or other document to be "written". Similarly, subpart three of New Zealand's Contract and Commercial Law Act 2017 codifies provisions pertaining to the recognition of electronic contracts. In India, electronic contracts are governed by the Indian Contract Act (1872), per which certain conditions need to be fulfilled while formulating a valid contract, and the Information Technology Act (2000) makes further provisions for the validity of online contracts in particular. In some U.S. states, email exchanges have been recognised as binding contracts. (Note: For instance, New York courts in 2016 held that the principles of real estate contracts apply equally to electronic communications and electronic signatures, so long as the "contents and subscription [of the contract] meet all requirements of the governing statute" and pursuant to the Electronic Signatures and Records Act (ESRA).)

==== Smart contracts ====
An emerging category of electronic contract is the smart contract, which consists of computer program or a transaction protocol capable of automatically executing, controlling, or documenting legally relevant events and actions according to the terms of a contract or an agreement. The objectives of smart contracts are the reduction of need in trusted intermediators, arbitrations and enforcement costs, fraud losses, as well as the reduction of malicious and accidental exceptions. A number of U.S. states have passed legislation expressly authorising the use of smart contracts, such as Arizona, Nevada, Tennessee, Wyoming, and Iowa.

=== Consumer contracts ===
Legislation in many jurisdictions distinguishes between consumer contracts, where one party contracts as a consumer or private individual and not acting for a trading or professional purpose, and contracts between business traders. There are additional protections for people being enticed into consumer contracts and protection their rights against unfair terms. Examples of such legislation include the European Union's Directive on Unfair Terms in Consumer Contracts and derivative legislation implementing the directive within EU member states. Under Quebec law, promises or agreements entered into before securing a consumer contract are not considered binding.

=== Standard form contracts ===
Standard form contracts are contracts in which one party supplies the text of a contract using a standard template, thus giving the other party no opportunity to negotiate its terms. A well-known example is the rise of clickwrap/shrink wrap contracts and terms of service which consumers of software products are required to sign in order to use products such as smartphones, computers, and other devices reliant on software; however, standard form contracts are common wherever there is an inequality of bargaining power between parties to an agreement.

Standard form contracts typically contain "boilerplate clauses" drafted by the party with greater bargaining power, which the party with weaker bargaining power was unable to negotiate against. A standard term contract that is particularly unfavourable to the party with weaker bargaining power may be regarded as a contract of adhesion and thus be considered unconscionable.

Each jurisdiction takes its own approach to determining whether a standard form contract is an unconscionable contract of adhesion.

==== Argentina ====
Under article 1119 of Argentina's civil and commercial code, a clause which "has for object or by effect cause a significant imbalance between the rights and obligations of the parties, to the detriment of the consumer" is considered an abusive clause, and, under article 37 of the country's consumer protection law, such clauses are generally unenforceable in Argentina. Similarly, consumer protection law in both Spain and Mexico limit the enforceability of such terms.

==== Canada ====
The doctrine of unconscionability restricts the enforceability of "unfair agreements that resulted from an inequality of bargaining power". The test for unconscionability applied by Canadian courts is to determine whether there was an inequality of bargaining power between the parties to the contract and, if so, whether this inequality resulted in the contract being an "improvident bargain" for the party with lesser bargaining power. The inequality criterion is satisfied where one party is unable to sufficiently protect its interests while negotiating the contract, while the improvidence criterion is satisfied where the contract "unduly advantages the stronger party or unduly disadvantages the more vulnerable". Improvidence must be measured with reference to the time of the contract's formation and involves a contextual assessment of "whether the potential for undue advantage or disadvantage created by the inequality of bargaining power has been realised".

==== United Kingdom ====
The Unfair Contract Terms Act 1977 regulates contracts by restricting the operation and legality of some contract terms. It extends to nearly all forms of contract and one of its most important functions is limiting the applicability of disclaimers of liability. The terms extend to both actual contract terms and notices that are seen to constitute a contractual obligation.

The Act renders terms excluding or limiting liability ineffective or subject to reasonableness, depending on the nature of the obligation purported to be excluded and whether the party purporting to exclude or limit business liability, acting against a consumer.

It is normally used in conjunction with the Unfair Terms in Consumer Contracts Regulations 1999 (Statutory Instrument 1999 No. 2083), as amended by the Unfair Terms in Consumer Contracts (Amendment) Regulations 2001, which further defined a 'Financial Service Authority' as well as the Sale of Goods Act 1979 and the Supply of Goods and Services Act 1982.

=== Rolling contract ===
A rolling contract or auto-renewing contract has provision within it for the contract automatically to extend when it reaches the end of its term (duration), unless the purchasing party has given notice, within a specific time period or in a specific form, of their intention that the contract will terminate at its term end.

=== Construction contracts ===
A range of contract types is available for use in contracting for construction work.

=== Freight and transport contracts ===
Contracts for the transport of goods and passengers are subject to a variety of distinct provisions both under international law and under the law of individual countries. Presently, different provisions apply at the international level to contracts for transport by maritime, land, and air transport. With regard to maritime transport, the Hague-Visby Rules currently govern contracts for the international carriage of goods by sea in the vast majority of jurisdictions. In Singapore and the United Kingdom, provisions of each of the two countries' Carriage of Goods by Sea Act additionally apply the Hague-Visby rules to the domestic transport of goods by sea. Similarly, the Montréal Convention and the Warsaw Convention provide standardised terms for the transport of passengers' luggage by air. Contracts for the international transport of goods by air and legal provisions regarding the international transport of passengers by any mode of transport are currently governed by a variety of domestic and international laws.

In an attempt to harmonise the complicated system of international law governing transport contracts, members of the Association of South East Asian Nations have adopted the ASEAN Framework Agreement on Multimodal Transport providing for standardised terms governing multimodal transport contracts within the bloc. The Civil Code of the People's Republic of China (CCPRC) makes similar provisions for multimodal transport contracts. Both the CCPRC and the ASEAN Framework provide for the primary multimodal transport operator to bear overarching contractual responsibility for damage or loss to the goods carried and provide for operators of particular legs of the transport contract to be treated as agents of the primary multimodal transport operator. In China, chapter nine of the civil code additionally provides standard terms for the carriage of both passengers and goods by each mode of transport.

With regard to maritime transport, common law jurisdictions additionally maintain special legal provisions regarding insurance contracts. Such provisions typically provide for the prohibition of contracts "by gaming or wagering" and prescribe special rules for double insurance, determining the existence of insurable interest, and governing the provisions that a maritime insurance policy must include.

In Europe, the international carriage of passengers by rail is governed by the CIV. The CIV establishes terms governing the transport of passengers, along with any accompanying articles (hand luggage, registered baggage, vehicles and trailers) and live animals. The traveller is responsible for full supervision of animals and their hand luggage.

In some common law jurisdictions, a distinction is made between contract carriers (who transport goods or individuals per private contracts) and common carriers (who are generally obliged to transport any passengers or goods). In some European civil law jurisdictions, the equivalent concept is referred to as a public carrier. While contract carriers negotiate contracts with their customers and (subject to international conventions) are able to allocate liability and refuse customers subject only to consumer protection or anti-discrimination laws, common carriers bear full liability for goods and passengers carried and may not discriminate.

=== Federal government contract types ===
The United States' Federal Acquisition Regulation (FAR), Part 16, describes the different types of contract available for use in federal government acquisition and when they may be used. In this context there are three main categories of contract: fixed-price contracts, cost-reimbursement contracts, and time-and-materials and labor-hour contracts. The Federal Acquisition Institute advises that selection of the best contract type is important, "as it is a driver of risk, incentives, and obligations for both the Government and the contractor". Government personnel are required by FAR 16.103(d) to record the reason why a particular type of contract was selected for each contract they let.

== Contemporary developments in contracting ==
=== Visual contracting ===
Several attempts to present and record contractual agreements with more visual impact have been considered since around 2000, for example from a Scandinavian perspective, Helena Haapio et al. in 2012 advocated "a visual turn in contracting" as a means of engaging those who read and work with contracts, improving understanding, easing implementation and avoiding disputes. Adrian Keating and Camilla Baasch Andersen noted that in eastern and northern Europe, including Germany, visualisation of contracts has been seen as promising in eastern and northern Europe, including Germany, and argued that the benefits of such a step "would seem apparent".

=== Fairer contracting and responsible contractual behaviour ===
Fairer standards of contracting and responsible contractual behaviour have been promoted by government bodies and civil society organisations, encouraged or mandated for public sector contracting, set out in guidance for both public and private sector contracting parties, and endorsed as an aim of public policy. The interdisciplinary Responsible Contracting Project sees "innovative contracting practice" as a means of improving the human rights of workers engaged in global supply chains.

In 2005–6, the Care Services Improvement Partnership, an arms-length agency which operated in the UK from 2004 to 2008, published a Guide to Fairer Contracting in two parts: part 1 covered the purchase of care placements and domiciliary care services in the UK social care market, and aimed to "open up a debate about what constitutes a fair contract", while part 2 covered writing specifications for fairer contracts. These documents were concerned with improving the relationships between commissioners and providers of care services, where effective contracting is seen as a skill which contributes to securing the best outcomes for recipients of care, and unfair contracting, especially unfair pricing, can increase the likelihood that the provider's business will fail and the service will be withdrawn. Deborah Clogg noted that a contractual document with "terms that appear only to reflect the interests of the purchaser" will appear to contradict any other expressions of "partnership" being adopted, and warned that leaving the contracting process to corporate lawyers or contract officers without a background in social care can be unproductive.

In construction, longer-term contracting and win-win contracting have been seen as desirable aims, and the offer of a "fair return" is seen as integral to effective contracting.

== Gallery ==
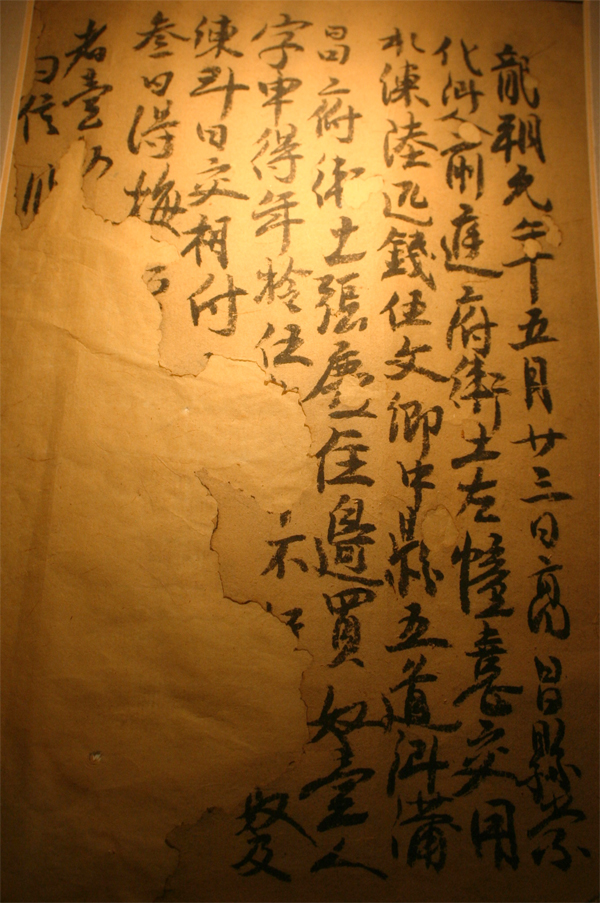
A contract from the Tang dynasty that records the purchase of a 15-year-old slave for six bolts of plain silk and five Chinese coins

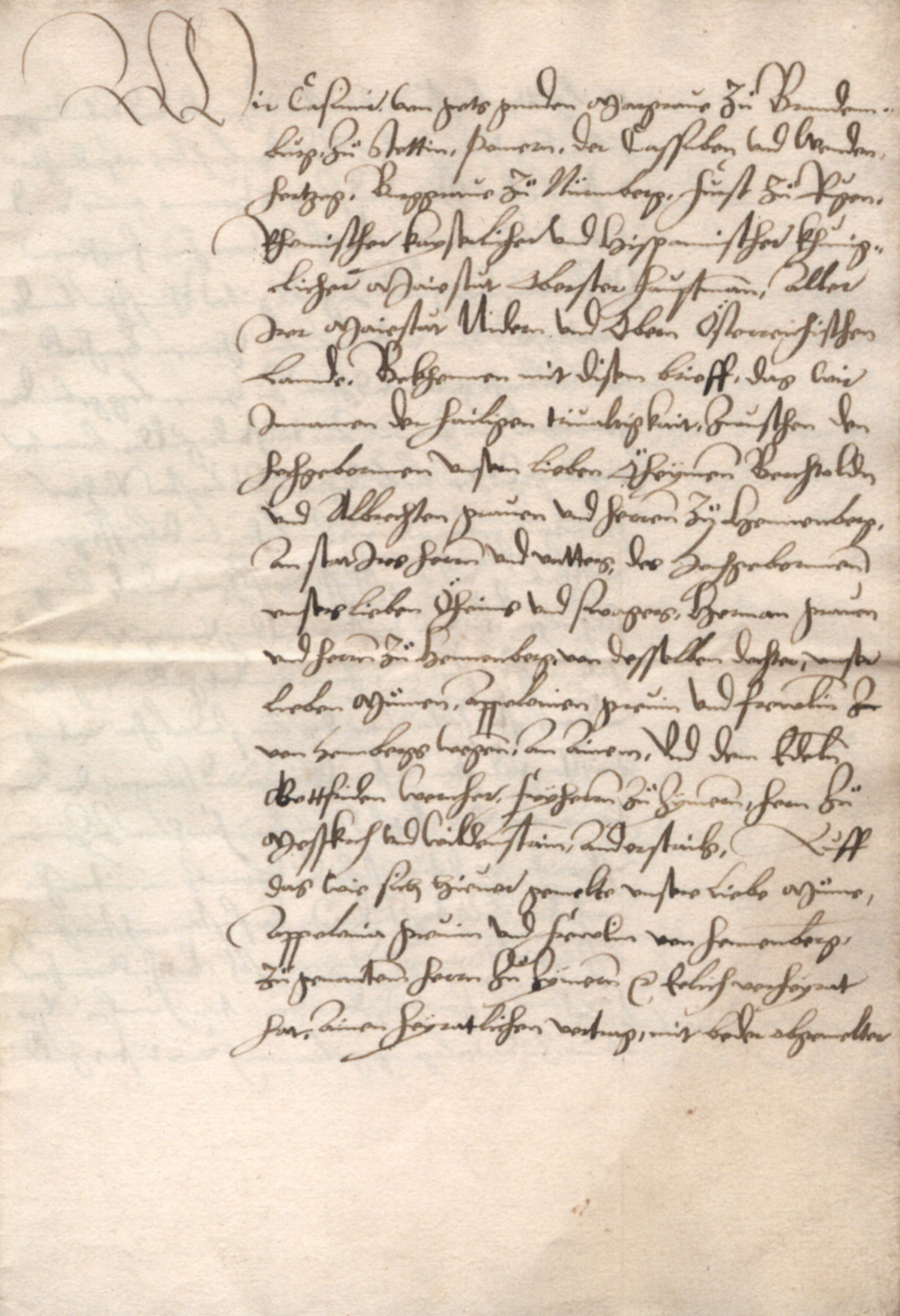
German marriage contract, 1521 between Gottfried Werner von Zimmern and Apollonia von Henneberg-Römhild

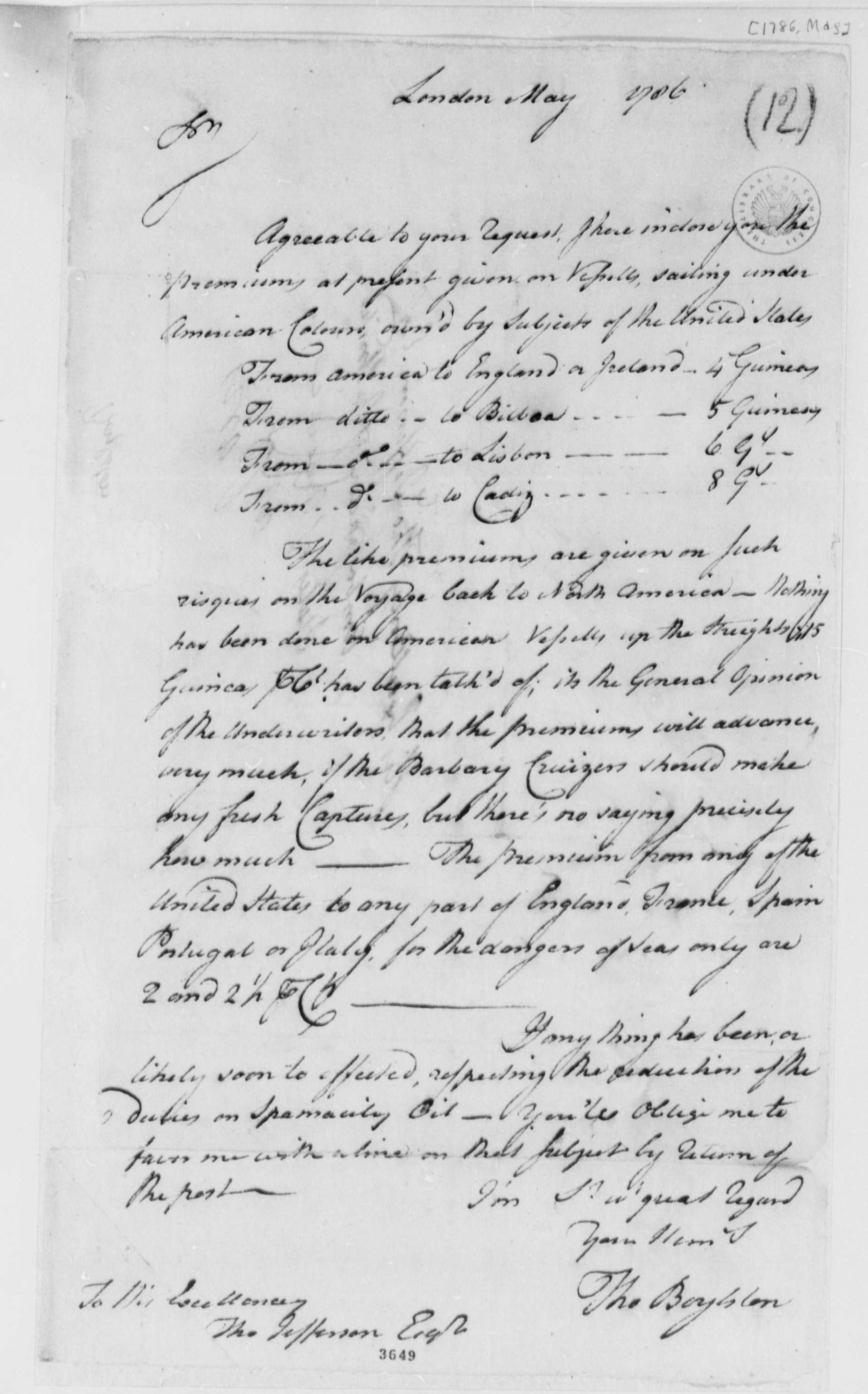
Thomas Boylston to Thomas Jefferson, May 1786, Maritime Insurance Premiums

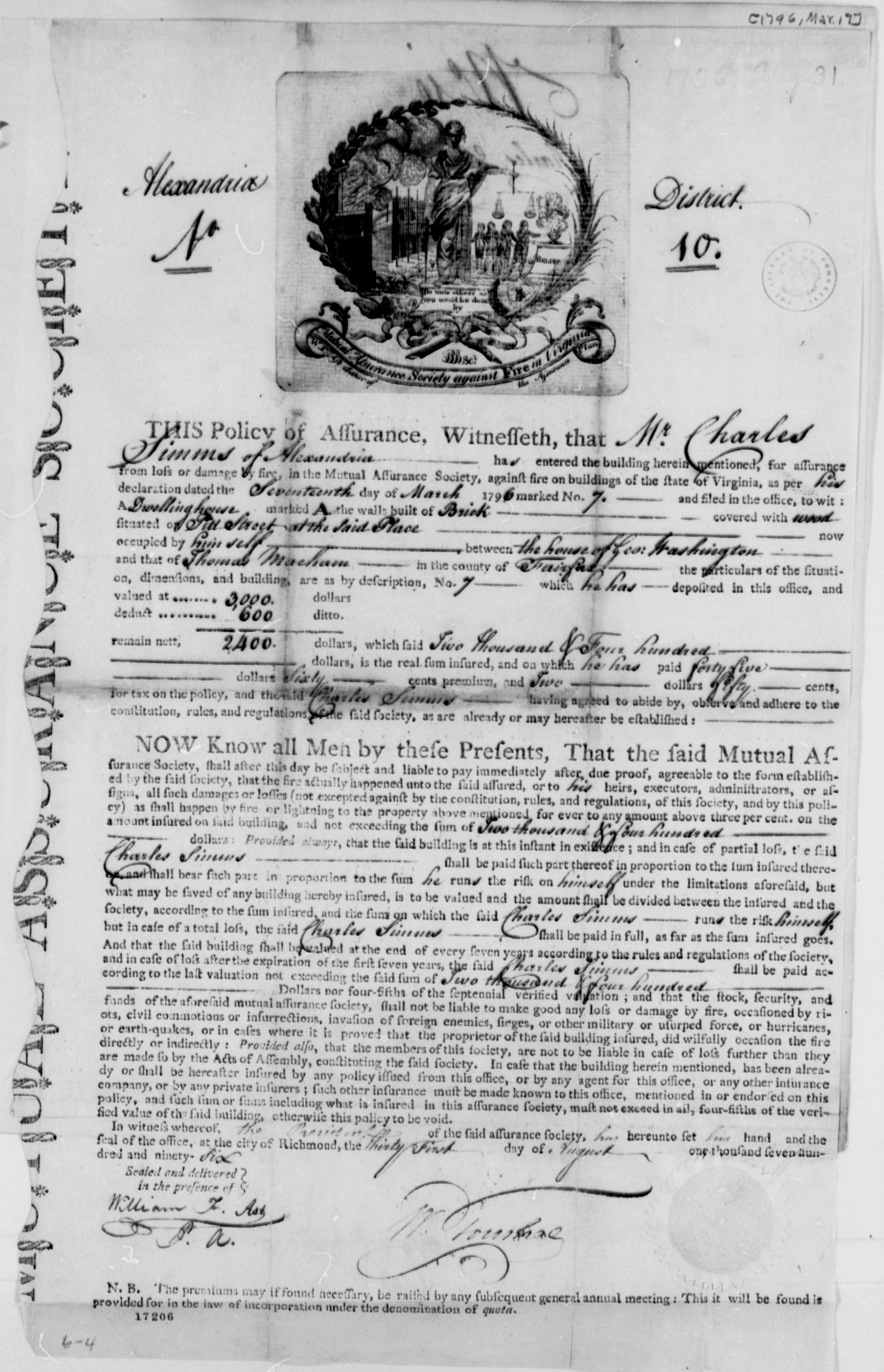
Fire insurance contract of 1796

== See also ==
- Arbitration clause
- Bill of sale
- Conflict of contract laws
- Contract awarding
- Contract farming
- Contract management
- Contract of sale
- Contract theory (economics)
- Contracting (Wiktionary)
- Contractual clauses (category)
- Design by contract
- Document automation
- Dual overhead rate
- Electronic signature
- Employment contract
- Estoppel
- Ethical implications in contracts
- Force majeure
- Further assurances
- Gentlemen's agreement
- Good faith
- Implicit contract
- Indenture
- Information asymmetry
- Invitation to treat
- Legal remedy
- Letters of assist
- Master service agreement
- Meeting of the minds
- Meet-or-release contract
- Memorandum of understanding
- Negotiation
- Option contract
- Order (business)
- Peppercorn (legal)
- Perfect tender rule
- Principal–agent problem
- Quasi-contract
- Restitution
- Sharia#Civil cases
- Smart contract
- Social contract
- Standard form contract
- Stipulation
- Tortious interference
- Unjust enrichment
- Voidable contract

=== By country ===
- Australian contract law
- Law of obligations (Bulgaria)
- Canadian contract law
- English contract law
- German contract law
- Contract law in Hong Kong
- Indian contract law
- Contract law in Saudi Arabia
- South African contract law
- United States contract law
