= Dual overhead rate =

Dual Overhead Rate Recovery is used in construction contracting as a costing equation for bidding a project, costing an existing project or allocating corporate overhead to multiple divisions of construction work. It produces two rates, 1) Labor / Equipment Rate 2) Material / Subcontract Rate. This equation produces a percentage allocation of each class of cost.
