= Meet-or-release contract =

Type of commercial contract

Meet-or-release contracts are contracts that include "meet or release" competition clauses. It is where a company agrees with a [customer] to sell a product at a certain given price. If, by any chance the customer finds a cheaper purchase the company must place their product at an equal or lesser value. The customer then has the option to be released from the contract only after giving the original company the opportunity to meet (or exceed) the less expensive offer. In some circumstances, exercising this clause's options may not be possible because the [customer] would have to disclose a [competitor's] confidential offer in order to allow another company the opportunity to match the offer.

Such a clause can force producers to reduce their prices, which leads to higher profits for the buyer.
