= Further assurances =

Contract law boilerplate

A further assurances clause is part of the standard 'boilerplate' in most sophisticated commercial agreements. It provides that a party shall provide cooperation and assistance to the other party in executing duties under the contract. For example, in an agreement for a home construction there might be a clause requiring the party purchasing the contractor's services to assist the contractor in securing variances, easements, or building permits required by law for a home construction. Without a further assurances clause one party might try to escape the contract by withholding assistance to the other party where that assistance is either necessary or of great importance. Accordingly, it is generally considered poor legal drafting to omit a further assurances provision where there is a possibility one's client may need the assistance of the other party to fulfill his responsibilities or obtain some intended benefit under the contract.
