= Heads of loss =

Contract law terminology

In contract law or tort law, the term heads of loss or heads of claim refers to categories of damage that a party may incur. It uses the term "head" in its sense of "category"; each head of loss refers to the damages that correspond to a particular category of duty.

== Contract law ==
When used in the context of contracts, "loss" is the equivalent of damages at common law. The measure of such damages can be complex, but the starting position is to put the injured party in the same position (so far as money can accomplish) as if the contract had been correctly performed

For example, a book on "Building Contract Claims" lists the following "more common heads of loss":

- On-site establishment costs
- Head office overheads
- Loss of profit
- Inefficient or increased use of labour and plant
- Winter working
- Plant
- Increased costs
- Financing charges and interest

== See also ==
- Duty of care
- Reliance damages
