= Transaction Protocol Data Unit =

Computer network protocol

The Transaction Protocol Data Unit (TPDU) is a packet-based protocol originally designed for financial transaction processing over an X.25 network.
