= History of contract law =

The history of contract law dates back to ancient civilizations and the development of contract law has been heavily influenced by Ancient Greek and Roman thought. There have been further significant developments in contract law during and since the Middle Ages and especially with the development of global trade.

== Ancient law ==
"If a man fails to fulfill an agreed contract - unless he had contracted to do something forbidden by law or decree, or gave his consent under some iniquitous pressure, or was involuntarily prevented from fulfilling his contract because of some unlooked-for accident - an action for such an unfulfilled agreement should be brought in the tribal courts, if the parties have not previously been able to reconcile their differences before arbitrators (their neighbors, that is)."

— Plato, The Laws, Book 11, §23, Contracts.

English contract law's history was heavily influenced by Ancient Greek and Roman thought. In The Laws, Plato devoted little attention to forms of agreement, but recognized the same basic categories for cancelling agreements as exist today. Roman law identified discrete categories of contractual transaction, each with its own requirements, which needed to be fulfilled in order for promises to be enforced. The general kind, stipulatio, required various words to be used to generate an obligation, or in a contractus litteris it could be written down. There were four categories of consensual agreement, and four kinds of contract creating property rights, such as a pledge (pignus) or a secured loan (mutuum). More than appeared from the general rules in Ancient Greece, Roman law represented an early division between specific kinds of contract, depending on the transaction's nature.

== Medieval law ==
=== England in the Middle Ages ===
During the Middle Ages, the English court system was minimal. In the local and manorial courts, according to the first treatise by Ranulf de Glanville, Treatise on the laws and customs of the English Kingdom in 1188, if people disputed the payment of a debt they, and witnesses, would attend court and swear oaths (called a wager of law). They risked perjury if they lost the case, and so this was strong encouragement to resolve disputes elsewhere. The royal courts accepted claims, without a wager of law, if "trespass on the case" was alleged. A jury would be called, but to access the royal courts, which were fixed by Magna Carta to meet in London, some breach of the King's peace had to be alleged. But gradually, the courts allowed claims where there had been no such trouble, no tort vi et armis, even though it was still necessary to inventively plead this. For instance, in 1317 one Simon de Rattlesdene alleged he was sold a tun of wine that was contaminated with salt water, "with force and arms, namely with swords and bows and arrows". The Court of Chancery and the King's Bench started to allow claims without the fictitious allegation of force and arms from around 1350. Otherwise, a breach of covenant required production of proof of an agreement from a seal. However, in The Humber Ferryman’s case a claim was allowed, without any documentary evidence, against a ferryman who dropped a horse overboard that he was contracted to carry across the River Humber. Despite this liberalisation, in the 1200s a threshold of 40 shillings for dispute value had been created. Though its importance tapered away with gradual inflation, it foreclosed court access to most people. Moreover, freedom to contract was firmly suppressed among the peasantry. After the Black Death, the Statute of Labourers 1351 prevented any increase in workers' wages, fuelling among other things the Peasants' Revolt of 1381.

With the courts' hostility to restraints on trade, the doctrine of consideration was forming, that to enforce any obligation something of value needed to be conveyed. Some courts remained sceptical that damages might be awarded purely for a broken agreement (that was not a sealed covenant). Other disputes allowed a remedy, notably in Shepton v Dogge where a defendant had agreed in London, where the City courts' custom was to allow claims without covenants under seal, to sell 28 acres of land in Hoxton. Although the house itself was outside London at the time, in Middlesex, a remedy was awarded for deceit, but essentially based on a failure to convey the land. The resolution of these restrictions came shortly after 1585, when a new Court of Exchequer Chamber was established to hear common law appeals. In 1602, in Slade v Morley, a grain merchant named Slade claimed that Morley had agreed to buy wheat and rye for £16, but had backed out. Actions for debt were in the jurisdiction of the Court of Common Pleas, but it had required that there needed to be both (1) proof of a debt, and (2) a subsequent promise to repay the debt, so that a finding of deceit (for non-payment) could be made against a defendant. But if a claimant wanted to simply demand payment of the contractual debt (rather than a subsequent promise to pay) he could have to risk a wager of law. The judges of the Court of the King's Bench was prepared to allow "assumpsit" actions (for obligations being assumed) simply from proof of the original agreement. With a majority in the Exchquer Chamber, after six years Lord Popham CJ held that "every contract importeth in itself an Assumpsit". Around the same time the Common Pleas indicated a different limit for contract enforcement in Bret v JS, that "natural affection of itself is not a sufficient consideration to ground an assumpsit" and there had to be some "express quid pro quo". Now that wager of law, and sealed covenants were essentially unnecessary, the Statute of Frauds 1677 codified the contract types that were thought should require some form.

=== European trade ===
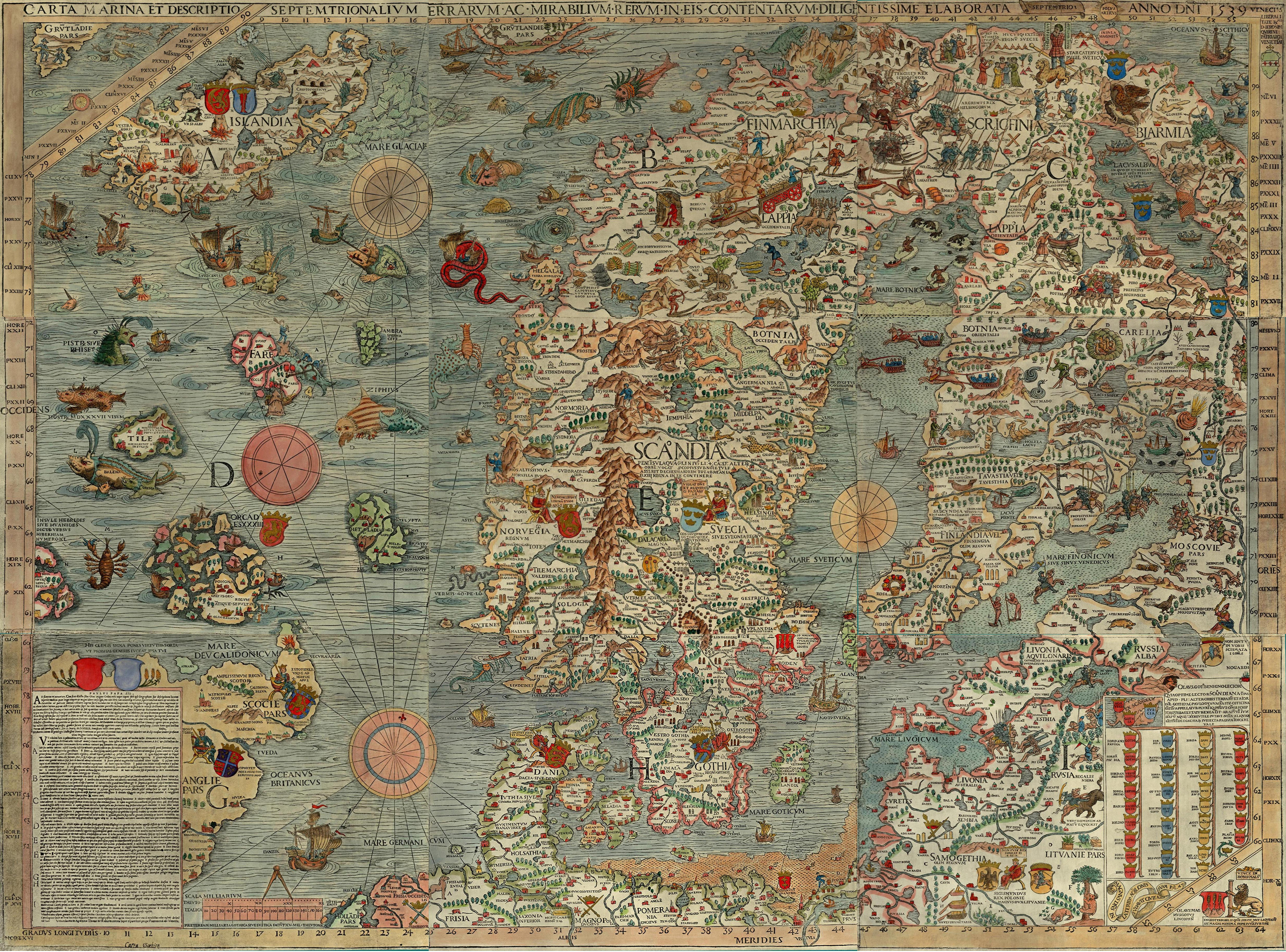
Merchants trading within the Hanseatic League conducted their affairs according to the lex mercatoria, whose principles were received into the English law of contract.

Increasingly, English contract law was affected by its trading relations with northern Europe, particularly since Magna Carta guaranteed merchants "safe and secure" exit and entry to England "for buying and selling by the ancient rights and customs, quit from all evil tolls". In 1266 King Henry III had granted the Hanseatic League a charter to trade in England. The "Easterlings" who came to trade brought goods and money that the English came to call "Sterling", and standard rules for commerce that formed a Lex Mercatoria, the laws of the merchants. Merchant custom was most influential in the coastal trading ports like London, Boston, Hull and King's Lynn.

In the 1500s, litigation sharply increased, although the causes are unclear and it may have been due to a centralization of lawsuits in the King's Bench and Common Pleas. The Chief Justices received a large portion of their income from fees paid by litigants, mostly in civil disputes.

Over the late 17th and 18th centuries Sir John Holt, and then Lord Mansfield actively incorporated the principles of international trade law and custom into English common law as they saw it: principles of commercial certainty, good faith, fair dealing, and the enforceability of seriously intended promises. As Lord Mansfield held, "Mercantile law is not the law of a particular country but the law of all nations", but also that "the law of merchants and the law of the land is the same".

== Early modern period ==
=== School of Salamanca ===
First movement to systematise contract law, the contractual doctrin of School of Salamanca is based on two pillars : freedom and equity.

The School of Salamanca played a great role in the diffusion of the contractual consensualism. If this idea was already admitted in canon law since the 12th Century and the application of the principle pacta sunt servanda, the civil law only followed this way in the 16th century after the call of famous jurists like Luis de Molina. Moreover, preceded notably by Leonardus Lessius, the Jesuit Pedro de Oñate claimed the existence of a "contractual freedom" and an "autonomy of the will" on the grounds that the Man, created by God who made him free, have an autonomy in the management of his goods and of his commitments. However, this liberty isn't complete because it cannot overstep the principle of free consent and because the contrat cannot ignore the formalism required by the authorities or have an immoral object.

The members of the School of Salamanca also thought, following Luis de Molina, that contracts have been established for common utility and consequently, that natural law can't tolerate a privileged party. To allow the application of this principle of commutative justice, they elaborated the concept of just price. Every violation of this notion constitutes a laesio for one, and an unjust enrichment, an infraction to the seventh Commandments and a sin for the other. Only a restitution of the undue prince enables the absolution and bring back the contractual equilibrium.

== Industrial revolution ==
=== Continental Europe ===
- Code Napoleon 1810
- German Civil Code 1900

=== United Kingdom ===
Over the industrial revolution, English courts became more and more wedded to the concept of "freedom of contract". It was partly a sign of progress, as the vestiges of feudal and mercantile restrictions on workers and businesses were lifted, a move of people from "status to contract". On the other hand, a preference for laissez faire thought concealed the inequality of bargaining power in contracts of employment, consumer, and tenancy. At the centre, captured in nursery rhymes like Robert Browning's Pied Piper of Hamelin in 1842 was the fabled notion that if people had promised something "let us keep our promise". But then, as if everybody had the same degree of free will, a generalised law of contract purported to cover every form of agreement was expounded. Courts were suspicious of interfering in agreements, whoever the parties were, so that in Printing and Numerical Registering Co v Sampson Sir George Jessel MR proclaimed that "contracts when entered into freely and voluntarily shall be held sacred and shall be enforced by Courts of justice." The Judicature Act 1875 merged the Courts of Chancery and common law, with equitable principles (such as estoppel, undue influence, rescission for misrepresentation and fiduciary duties or disclosure requirements in some transactions) always taking precedence. But the essential principles of English contract law remained stable and familiar, as an offer for certain terms, mirrored by an acceptance, supported by consideration, and free from duress, undue influence or misrepresentation, would generally be enforceable. The rules were exported across the British Empire, as for example in the Indian Contract Act 1872. Further requirements of fairness in exchanges between unequal parties, or general obligations of good faith and disclosure were unwarranted because was said that liabilities "are not to be forced upon people behind their backs". Parliament's statutes, outside general codifications of commercial law like the Sale of Goods Act 1893, left people to the harsh "freedom of contract" of the market until the property qualifications for Parliament were reduced, and the electoral vote finally became democratic.

== Twentieth century ==
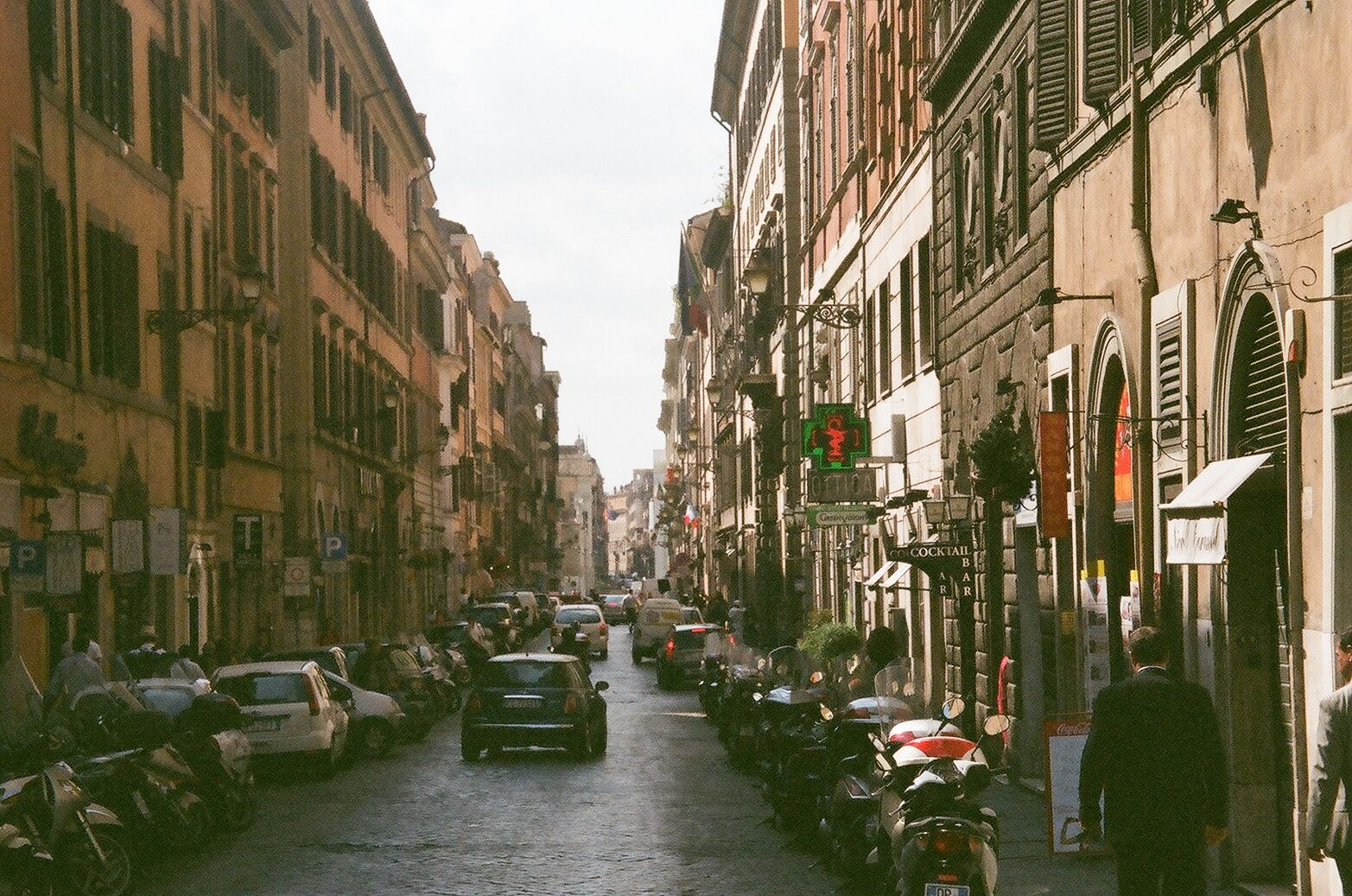
Unidroit, based in Rome and established in 1926 under the League of Nations to unify private law, maintains the influential Principles of International Commercial Contracts of 2004. A similar effort is the Principles of European Contract Law of 2002.

Over the 20th century, legislation and changes' in court attitudes effected a wide-ranging reform of 19th century contract law. First, specific types of non-commercial contract were given special protection where "freedom of contract" appeared far more on the side of large businesses. Consumer contracts came to be regarded as "contracts of adhesion" where there was no real negotiation and most people were given "take it or leave it" terms.

=== United Kingdom ===
In the UK, the courts began by requiring entirely clear information before onerous clauses could be enforced, the Misrepresentation Act 1967 switched the burden of proof onto business to show misleading statements were not negligent, and the Unfair Contract Terms Act 1977 created the jurisdiction to scrap contract terms that were "unreasonable" considering the bargaining power of the parties. Collective bargaining and growing number of employment rights carried the employment contract into an autonomous field of labour law where workers had rights, like a minimum wage, fairness in dismissal, the right to join a union and take collective action, and these could not be given up in a contract with an employer. Private housing was subject to basic terms, such as the right to repairs, and restrictions on unfair rent increases, though many protection was abolished during the 1980s. This reduced the scope of the general law of contract, and meant that most contracts individual people made in their ordinary lives were shielded from the power of corporations to impose whatever terms they chose in selling goods and services, at work, and in people's home. Nevertheless, classical contract law remained at the foundation of specific contracts, unless particular rights were given by the courts or Parliament.

== Globalisation ==
Internationally, the UK had joined the European Union, which aimed to harmonise significant parts of consumer and employment law across member states. Moreover, with increasing openness of markets commercial contracts were receiving ideas from abroad. Both the Principles of European Contract Law, the UNIDROIT Principles of International Commercial Contracts, and the practice of international commercial arbitration was reshaping thinking about English contract principles with the rest of the globalising economy.

== See also ==
- US contract law
- English contract law
