= European civil code =

Proposed European Union law

The European civil code (ECC) is a proposed harmonisation of private law across the European Union.

The ultimate aim of a European civil code is, like a national civil code, to deal comprehensively with the core areas of private law. Private law typically covered in a civil code includes the family law, the law of inheritance, property law and the law of obligations. The law of obligations includes the law of contracts, delicts (or torts) and restitution. It was from work on European contract law that the push for a comprehensive European civil code arose. The development of a European civil code has primarily focused on creating a unified law of contracts. Thus, the term 'European civil code' is often used with specific reference to the harmonisation of contract law throughout the EU.

== History ==
=== The Lando Commission ===
The idea of a unified European civil code can be traced to the idea of a unified Europe and the creation of the European Union. The European Parliament requested the creation of a European civil code in 1989, 1994 and 2000. A pragmatic approach has seen the proponents of a European civil code develop uniform laws in discrete areas before working towards a comprehensive European civil code.

Development of a European code for contract law began in 1982 with the formation of the Commission on European Contract Law. This became known as the Lando Commission after its Danish chairman Ole Lando, who died in April 2019. At the same time UNIDROIT began similar studies leading to their 1994 publication Principles for International Commercial Contracts. The Lando Commission focused on creating their Principles of European Contract Law (PECL). The first part of the PECL was published in 1995, followed by Part II in 1999 and the final Part III in 2003. These Principles of European Contract Law may eventually form one part of the European civil code.

=== Towards a European Civil Code ===
In 1997 the Dutch Government, as then Chair of the European Union, held a conference titled 'Towards a European Civil Code'. The conference considered the feasibility of such a code and led to the creation of a book titled Towards a European Civil Code. The third edition was published in 2004 and although the primary focus is European contract law, it considers other areas of private law that may form part of a European civil code as well. The years following this conference have seen the development of many academic groups focusing on different areas of private law. These include:

- The Study Group on a European Civil Code, formed in 1997 and chaired by Professor Christian von Bar at the University of Osnabrück.
- The Acquis Group (official name: Research Group on EC Private Law) at the University of Münster focuses on existing European Community private law.
- The Commission on European Family Law based at Utrecht University.
- The European Group on Tort Law, also called the Spier/Koziol group, in association with the European Centre of Tort and Insurance Law in Vienna.
- The Common Core of European Private Law project conducted by Mauro Bussani and Ugo Mattei at the University of Trento.
- The Académie des Privatistes Européens at the University of Pavia, headed by Giuseppe Gandolfi. It published a Draft Code ('avant-projet') in 2002.
- The Leuven Centre for a Common Law of Europe, founded in 2001 by professor Walter Van Gerven, who wrote a number of European casebooks together with Basil Markesinis.
- The Joint Network on European Private Law has also been created and includes several of the above groups.

=== Common Frame of Reference ===
On 11 July 2001, the European Commission issued a Communication in relation to possible developments in European contract law. Following the review of submissions on the Communication, the Commission released an Action Plan for a more coherent European contract law in 2003. The Action Plan began the process of creating what is known as the Common Frame of Reference (CFR). This was followed in 2004 by the publication of "European Contract Law and revision of the acquis: the way forward". The CFR is intended to provide a structure and guideline for the development of harmonised European private law but has a specific focus on contract law. It was hoped that the creation of a unified European contract law would be achieved by 2010.

The Draft Common Frame of Reference (DCFR), a joint project of the Study Group and Acquis Group (funded by the European Commission for €4.3 million), was published in December 2007. Although the European Commission downplayed the CFR's expected future importance in a July 2006 report, a March 2006 European Parliament resolution stated that "Even though the Commission denies that this is its objective, it is clear that many of the researchers and stakeholders working on the project believe that the ultimate long-term outcome will be a European code of obligations or even a full-blown European Civil Code." Economist Gerhard Wagner hailed "the drafting of a coherent set of rules" for all of Europe, such as the DCFR, as "an immense scientific achievement".

== Contents of a European civil code ==
A comprehensive European civil code would cover the major areas of private law in much the same way as domestic civil codes. The major areas that have been suggested are contract law, torts, property, restitution and also company law.

Although family law and inheritance law are normally covered by domestic civil codes there is doubt over whether it is possible to include them in a broad European code. These two areas of law are often closely tied to a nation's culture. For this reason it may not be possible or suitable to create a uniform code to cover the entire European Union. In any case, policy-makers have recognised that Europe brings together a diverse range of legal traditions and that taking account of this diversity is one of the "key criteria" for the success of the project. Stakeholders also recognise that there is a diversity across economic interests engaged by the search for a common legal position. (Note: These two factors were identified at a joint European Parliament/European Commission conference held in April 2004, where the dedication of "real resources" and the supply of appropriate technical expertise were also recognised as critical for the success of the project.) Contract law, including areas of consumer protection such as the exclusion of unfair contract terms, is perhaps the most suited for harmonisation, followed by other areas of the law of obligations and the law of property. The creation of individual codes for discrete areas of private law is considered the most feasible and realistic goal. For this reason efforts have concentrated on creating a unified European contract law before attempting a more comprehensive European civil code.

An example of a modern comprehensive code is the Dutch Burgerlijk Wetboek which came into force in 1992. The Burgerlijk Wetboek covers civil, commercial law, consumer law and labour law and was almost 40 years in the making. This gives an indication of how long it may take to create a complete unified European civil code. The March 2006 European Parliament resolution recommended taking the new Dutch civil code as a model as well.

== Arguments for and against a European civil code ==
Many arguments have been raised both supporting and rejecting the idea of a European civil code. Included in this are claims that the creation of a civil code binding across the European Union will be impossible to achieve. As a much broader project, the creation of a European civil code is more easily dismissed than attempts at unifying discrete areas such as contract law.

=== For ===
Arguments supporting a unified European civil code relate to the emergence of the European Union and an increasingly globalised economy. Proponents also point out that Europe, including England, shares a long legal history in the form of the ius commune before the 18th and 19th century national codifications. Besides, except for England and Ireland, all of Europe shares the civil law tradition which began with the Napoleonic Code of 1804.

1. The European Union represents a unification of Europe and a reduction in the significance of national borders. The creation of a European civil code can be seen as a further step in this process of unification.
2. There is no particular reason to assume the national level is the 'natural' level to regulate matters such as contract law on, because it was nearly the same across Europe for centuries up until the 19th century (when nation-states were formed), and if it would be somehow better regulated 'closer to the citizens', one might as well take it to the provincial or municipal level instead of the national level.
3. Differences in national laws may create problems of efficacy in the ever more globalised economy. A uniform civil code will help overcome these problems and reduce barriers to increased trade within the European Union.
4. European integration has rapidly increased the mobility of private persons, be they employees, students, migrants or tourists. Harmonisation of European civil law will facilitate citizens' mobility by increasing their legal security.
5. The increasing use of standard form contracts is also said to indicate a desire for a European civil code or at least a harmonisation of European contract law.
6. Anticipated obstacles, such as the alleged incompatibility between the continental civil law tradition and the English common law tradition, shouldn't be too much of a problem to overcome, since the underlying legal concepts and rules aren't really all that different.
7. Some argue for an 'optional' European Civil Code, alongside the national civil codes, leaving the contracting parties the freedom to choose and thus opening up more possibilities.
8. Contracting parties will no longer need to hire expensive experts from the countries involved to explain to judges how the respective countries' law is to be understood on numerous matters. A policy aimed at the development of a European civil code will easily pass the proportionality test.

=== Against ===
The feasibility of a European civil code has been questioned on both political and legal grounds. Cultural differences and the lack of a common European legal culture are often cited by opponents. The connection between law, language, culture and national history forms one small aspect of the arguments against replacing national civil codes with a European code. Arguments based upon cultural differences are, however, difficult to establish.

More substantive difficulties, which for some are reasons why it is neither feasible nor desirable to create a European civil code, include:

1. The process by which Community instruments are now produced leads almost inevitably to second-rate law. For example, within private international law, which is harmonised within the European Union, the Rome II Regulation is an unhappy political compromise between Parliament, Council and Commission.
2. Once a Civil Code is in place, any errors it contains will take years, if not decades, to correct as agreement from all participating parties will be required.
3. Any Civil Code will be a piecemeal replacement of part of each member state's legal system. Laws within nations form a system: one part is shaped by and dependent upon another. Replacing part of each system's law, without altering the rest, will introduce incoherence.
4. If the European Court of Justice is given jurisdiction over the interpretation of any code, even more disputes will be subject to the gross delays to which appeals to that court are already subject.
5. The draft principles in existence are not, substantively, satisfactory. For example, the draft Principles of Liability for Non-Contractual Damage define "causation" in a way that is transparently circular: "A person causes legally relevant damage to another if the damage is to be regarded as a consequence of that person's conduct or the source of danger for which that person is responsible."
6. It is impossible within a few brief code provisions to capture the many technical and minor points which are thrown up in private law disputes. Within member states these have long been settled, although not uniformly. A new Code will lead to immense litigation and disruption as these points are re-litigated anew.
7. There is also the issue regarding the differences between common law and civil law and which principles to adopt, an issue which can be underrated. Opponents argue the two systems vary greatly at times and any successful civil code would have to take this into consideration due to the UK's status as compared to the rest of the EU. This makes introducing "harmonised" or "standardised" principles difficult in both theory and practice where some jurisdictions do not recognise certain practices (i.e. the right to specific performance, the inclusion of prior negotiations in contract interpretation etc.) or approach concepts in different ways (i.e. "good faith", "equity"). It would not be easy to reconcile such differences.

In April 2017, after Theresa May triggered Article 50 for the UK, Guy Verhofstadt remarked that "it was naïve, maybe, to reconcile the legal system of Napoleon with the common law of the British Empire, and perhaps it was never meant to be. But our predecessors should never be blamed for having tried to."

Whether the European Union has the legal power to create a European civil code has also been an issue. Article 95 of the EC Treaty (now Article 114 TFEU) is considered the means through which a code would be created. However, many people believe that the EU lacks the constitutional competence to enact a comprehensive code. Others argue that this does not defeat the idea of a European civil code and is merely a political issue. If a general consensus were to be reached in favour of a European civil code, it might be politically possible to expand the constitutional competence of the European Union or create an international treaty giving effect to the code. According to professor Christian von Bar "it fully depends on a political decision of the European Commission, the [EU] Council and the European Parliament if in the end, the Common Frame of Reference will be adopted as an EU instrument."

== European contract law ==
To date, the discussion of a European civil code has focussed primarily on the development of a unified European contract code. Proponents of a European code of contract law have largely been divided into two groups. One group favours the use of the acquis communautaire (the body of European Union law) as the basis of a unified European contract law. The other has preferred a foundation in the field of comparative law and analysis of the domestic contract law of member states of the EU. The latter view was the initially dominant opinion in the field, but more recently the Acquis position has come to the fore.

Both options were provided for in the Commission of European Communities' 2001 Communication on European contract law. Although there were many submissions supporting both fields of thought, most favoured a review of the Acquis as a basis for developing European contract law. The subsequent Action Plan and its follow up Way Forward paper have progressed the development of a European code of contract law as well as a more comprehensive European civil code. The intended outcome of this new stage is the publication of the Common Frame of Reference. The CFR is hoped by some to form the central part of a future unified European contract law, although this is not its purpose. It is expected to be published in 2009/10.

Professor of European Private Law Martijn W. Hesselink (director of the Amsterdam Centre for the Study of European Contract Law at the University of Amsterdam) argued in October 2007 that the development of a European contract code, or more broadly, a civil code, should happen transparently, and with the participation and consent of citizens, consumers and smaller companies, lest big businesses will be able to obtain too much power over the others.

== European tort law ==
European tort law, as a term, is not strictly defined and is used to describe a number of various features concerning tort law in Europe. The concept developed alongside other major historic developments of European integration. There is a group of scholars, known as The European Group on Tort Law which was established in 1992. The group meets regularly to discuss fundamental issues of tort law liability as well as recent developments and the future directions of the law of tort. The Group has founded the European Centre of Tort and Insurance Law in Vienna.

The Group has drafted a collection of Principles of European Tort Law similar to the Principles of European Contract Law drafted by the European Contract Law Commission.

== See also ==
- Restatements of the Law

== Literature ==
- Hartkamp, A. S.; et al. (2011). Towards a European Civil Code (4 ed.). Nijmegen: Ars Aequi. ISBN 9789069167152. Archived from the original on 12 February 2019.
- von Bar, Christian; Clive, Eric; Schulte-Nölke, Hans (2009). Principles, Definitions and Model Rules of European Private Law: Draft Common Frame of Reference (DCFR), Volume 2 (Outline ed.). Munich: Sellier. European Law Publishers. ISBN 9783866530973. (Study Group on a European Civil Code & Acquis Group)
