= Political institutions of ancient Rome =

Various lists regarding the political institutions of ancient Rome are presented. Each entry in a list is a link to a separate article. Categories included are: laws (5), and legislatures (7); state offices (40) and office holders (6 lists); political factions (2 + 1 conflict) and social ranks (8). A political glossary (38) of similar construction follows.

== Laws ==
- Roman law
- List of Roman laws
- Twelve Tables
- Digest of Roman law
- Corpus Juris Civilis

== Legislatures ==
- Roman Senate
- Roman assemblies
- Roman Curia
- Comitia curiata
- Comitia centuriata
- Comitia tributa
- Concilium plebis

== State offices ==
- aedile – Roman republican magistrate charged with city maintenance and order
- agentes in rebus – Late Roman Imperial Courier Service
- a rationibus – Secretary of finance in the Roman Empire
- censor – Roman magistrate and census administrator
- comes – Latin word for companion, Roman court title
- comes palatinus – High-level official attached to imperial or royal courts in Europe since Roman times
- consul – Political office in ancient Rome
- consularis – Ancient Roman title, given to those who had served as consuls
- decemviri – 10-man commission in the Roman Republic
- dictator – Extraordinary magistrate of the Roman Republic
- dux – Roman title
- emperor – Ruler of the Roman Empire
- governor – Position
- imperator – Rank in ancient Rome
- legatus – High-ranking Roman military officer
- legatus Augusti pro praetore – Provincial governors in the Roman Empire
- lictor – Bodyguard and attendant to ancient Roman magistrates
- magistrate – Elected official in ancient Rome
- officium – Latin word with various meanings
- pontifex maximus – Chief high priest in ancient Rome
- praefectus – Prefect in ancient Rome
- praepositus sacri cubiculi
- praeses – Latin word
- praetor – Magistrate of the Roman Republic
- praetor peregrinus – Magistrate of the Roman Republic
- primicerius – Ancient Roman title
- princeps – Ancient Roman title
- princeps senatus – First member by precedence of the Roman Senate
- proconsul – Governor of a province in the Roman republic
- procurator – Administrative title in the Roman Empire
- promagistrates – Ancient Roman office
- quaestor – Public official in ancient Rome
- rationalis – Roman Empire finance minister role
- rector – Political function in Rome and in medieval republics
- rex – Chief magistrate of the Roman Kingdom
- senator – Political institution in ancient Rome
- tribune – Elected Roman officials
- triumviri – Commission of three men in ancient Rome
- vicarius – Latin word meaning substitute or deputy
- vigintisexviri – College of minor magistrates of the Roman Republic

== Lists of individual office holders ==
- List of Roman kings
- List of Roman consuls
- List of Roman emperors
- List of principes senatus
- List of Roman censors
- List of Roman governors of Britain

== Political factions ==
- Optimates
- Populares

(also see Conflict of the Orders)

== Social ranks ==
- Nobles
- Patricians
- Equites
- Plebs
- Adsidui
- Proletarians
- Capite censi
- Slaves

== Glossary of law and politics ==
- aerarium – Public treasury in ancient Rome
- aequitas – Roman legal concept
- auctoritas – Roman prestige; contrast with power, imperium
- civitas – Roman concept of citizenry as an entity united by law
- collegia – Any association in ancient Rome that acted as a legal entity
- consilium
- consortium – Association of two or more individuals and/or organizations to achieve a common goal
- consuetudo – Legal principle
- contractus
- contractus litteris
- curiae – Assembly where issues are discussed and decided
- cursus honorum – Sequential order of public offices held by politicians in Ancient Rome
- decreta – Edict or proclamation usually issued by a head of state
- delectum – Civil wrong
- edicta – Announcement of a law, often associated with monarchism
- fiscus – Imperial Roman treasury
- fiducia
- gravitas – Ancient Roman virtue
- imperium – Type of authority in ancient Rome
- iudex – Person who is to make a decision in court based on the law
- ius – Rights to citizenship virtue in ancient Rome
- lex
- libertas – Roman goddess of liberty
- mos maiorum – Customs and traditions of ancient Rome
- munera – Public works and entertainment paid for by aristocrats of ancient Rome
- municipium – Ancient Roman term for a town or city
- obligatio – Course of action someone must take
- Palatine – High-level official attached to imperial or royal courts in Europe since Roman times
- patria
- pietas – Ancient Roman virtue
- potestas – Latin word meaning power or faculty
- responsa – Body of written legal decisions and rulings
- provincia – Ancient Roman administrative regions
- ratio – Relationship between two numbers of the same kind
- senatus consultum – Resolution of the ancient Roman Senate
- stipulatio – Form of contract in Ancient Roman law
- First Triumvirate – Alliance between Roman politicians Caesar, Pompey and Crassus
- Second Triumvirate – Roman political entity (43–32 BC)

== See also ==
- Tarpeian Rock – Steep cliff used for executions in ancient Rome
