= Hydrocarbons Licensing Directive Regulations 1995 =

The Hydrocarbons Licensing Directive Regulations 1995
- Statutory Instrument
- Parliament of the United Kingdom
- Citation: SI 1995/1434
- Territorial extent: Great Britain

Dates
- Made: 25 May 1995
- Laid before Parliament: 6 June 1995
- Commencement: 30 June 1995
Other legislation
Made under	European Communities Act 1972
Transposes	Hydrocarbons Directive 1994

Status: Amended

Text of statute as originally enacted

The Hydrocarbons Licensing Directive Regulations 1995 (SI 1995/1434) is a UK statutory instrument that implements the Hydrocarbons Directive 1994 94/22/EC. It is relevant for UK enterprise law by determining the procedural steps that ought to be taken when a company is licensed to seek or extract oil and gas.

== Contents ==
- reg 3(1) ‘every application’ for a license has to be determined on (a) technical and financial capability of the applicant (b) the applicant's proposed methods (c) for tenders, the price (d) previous conduct if formerly a licensee under Petroleum (Production) Act 1934. The Minister can refuse an application even if there is no competition (2) ‘other relevant criteria’ can be applied if all else seems equal (4) the criteria cannot be used to discriminate. National security can be a ground.
- reg 4(1) the only terms in a license must but those to (a) ensure proper performance of activities in the licence (b) provide for payment for the grant of a licence (c) operational and other purposes in reg 4(2)
- reg 5, criteria must be put in the notice inviting applications by the Minister.

== See also ==
- UK enterprise law
- UK energy law
