= European tort law =

European tort law, as a term, is not strictly defined and is used to describe a number of various features concerning tort law in Europe. The concept developed alongside other major historic developments of European integration.

== History ==
After World War II, the concept of a united Europe began to take shape. The ideas of a unified Europe varied in degree. Some envisioned a federal Europe run by a European government and others merely aimed for an economic co-operation only to achieve a common internal market. The result today is somewhere in between these two extremes.

As Europe merged politically, a common European tort law also emerged. In the middle of the 20th Century, European tort law was varied and a common European tort law was non-existent. Only in the beginning of the 21st did it start to take shape.

== Background ==
The ideas on the harmonisation of European tort law also vary drastically. On the one hand there is a vision of a codification of European tort law as part of a European civil code. But on the other side of the spectrum is the idea that harmonisation should only be to the extent necessary for a functioning of the internal market. Once again, the current situation is somewhere in between.

There are various developments occurring in this area. The European Court of Justice (ECJ) has developed case law on the basis of general principles common to the laws of the Member States. The European Commission has also looked toward harmonisation by proposing to develop a so-called Common Frame of References. National courts and legislators are also becoming more prepared to look at foreign developments.

These various developments demonstrate that although a convergent tendency is apparent at some points, differences between Member States remain substantial. This is not only in content but there are also differences in procedure, in legal culture, and in social, economic and political backgrounds. European tort law is not only about slowly growing harmony in certain respects but also about rich diversity in many others.

== Comparative law ==
In the institutions of the European Union, such as the Council, the Commission and the Court, where lawyers from all Member States work closely together, different legal backgrounds inevitably play a role. Comparative law can thus be seen as a vital method in finding common ground and developing Union law. The courts however, usually confine themselves to general expression like 'legal principles common to all or several Member States.'

To acknowledge the existence of a general principle of law, the ECJ does not require that the rules be a feature of all the national legal systems. Rather, the Court merely finds that the principle is generally acknowledged and that, beyond divergences, the domestic laws of the Member State show the existence of common criteria.

The highest national courts also show an increasing interest in and need for comparative information. Here it is used to avoid gaps between legal systems. As Lord Bingham notes; 'In a shrinking world there must be some virtue in uniformity of outcome whatever the diversity of approach in reaching that outcome'. In this sense also, Comparative Law is a converging tool.

== European Union ==
The legal framework of the European Union consists of the treaties, regulations, directives and case law.

Specifically in the area of tort law, a number of rules can be found in tort law directives. Examples of directives include the Product Liability Directive and the Directive on Unfair Commercial Practices. A directives can be either a maximum harmonisation directives, which means member states are not allowed to deviate from it, or a minimum harmonisation directive, which only provide a general framework. Article 288 of the TFEU, however, concedes that a directive 'shall be binding as to the result to be achieved, upon each member State to which it is addressed, but shall leave to national authorities the choice of form and methods'.

Liability can also be based on the violation of community provisions. Article 288 of the TFEU explicitly regulates the liability of Community Institutions for damage caused by the breach of Union Law. This article does not give precise liability rules but refers to the general principles common to the laws of Member States. It does not mean that 'the Community judicature must search for a solution favoured by a majority of Member States …. It simply means that the Community judicature must look to the national systems for inspiration in devising a regime of non-contractual liability adapted to the specific circumstances of the Community.'

The development of a general principle of liability for breach of Union Law is also in the Francovich case law of the ECJ. In this 1991 decision, the ECJ acknowledged liability of the Member States towards individuals for violation of Union law as being inherent in the system of the Treaty and being necessary for the effectiveness of Community of law. On the basis of the general principles to which Article 288 refers, the ECJ developed three requirements for liability:

1. The rule of law infringed must be intended to confer rights on individuals
2. The breach must be sufficiently serious
3. There must be a direct causal link between the breach of the obligation resting on the State and the damage sustained by the injured parties.

The fulfilment of these requirements is sufficient for a right to compensation, which is directly based in Union Law.

== European tort law in action ==
There is a group of scholars, known as The European Group on Tort Law which was established in 1992. The group meets regularly to discuss fundamental issues of tort law liability as well as recent developments and the future directions of the law of tort. The Group has founded the European Centre of Tort and Insurance Law in Vienna.

The Group has drafted a collection of Principles of European Tort Law similar to the Principles of European Contract Law drafted by the European Contract Law Commission.

The Principles of European Tort Law are a compilation of guidelines by the European Group on Tort Law aiming at the harmonization of European tort law. They are not intended to serve as a model code, even though their wording may resemble statutory texts. At least with respect to form and structure, they resemble a U.S. Restatement of the Law.

The Principles of European Tort Law are intended to serve as a common framework for the further development of national tort laws and also of singular European legislation, which could avoid a further drifting-apart of piecemeal rule-making both on a national and on the European level.

=== Principles ===
1. Basic Norm
2. General Conditions of Liability
  - Damage
  - Causation
3. Bases of Liability
  - Liability based on fault
  - Strict Liability
  - Liability for others
4. Defences
  - Defences in general
  - Contributory conduct or activity
5. Multiple Tortfeasors
6. Remedies
  - Damages

== Future ==
Despite these efforts, there is still the preliminary question of whether harmonisation of tort law is feasible and desirable. There is argument to suggest that harmonisation is not as self-evident as it seems to be at first. Harmonization of tort law does not need only a formal legal basis but also a substantial justification. The need for harmonisation may be self-evident because the idea was that differences between the Member States were an obstacle to the achievement of an internal market. According to the ECJ, a measure of harmonisation must actually contribute to improving the establishment and functioning of the internal market. A harmonising measure therefore has to delineate the distortions that flow from the differences between national laws. Also, it would have to outline how the measures aim to prevent distortions. In any case, the advantages of these measures need to be balanced with the costs involved.

There are two observations which may further question the desirability and feasibility of the harmonisation of tort law. Firstly, the harmonisation of tort law is hard to achieve without taking into account other compensation systems, such as private insurance and social security systems. These systems are strongly interconnected and it is undesirable to harmonise one without the others.

Secondly, harmonisation of tort law would also need harmonisation of administrative and criminal law. Most legal systems acknowledge the possibility to be liable for damage caused by the violation of a statutory duty. Hence, if there were to be harmonisation of the rules for breach of statutory duty, one should also harmonise the statutory rules that can be invoked as a basis for this tort.

What is certain is that, an agenda for further debate must be pursued. Perhaps the focus should not be on Europe united by European rules, but rather on a Europe united in diversity with harmonised rules where needed and diversity where possible.
