= PICC =

PICC may refer to:

- People's Insurance Company of China, a Chinese insurance company
- Peripherally inserted central catheter (PICC), in medicine, a type of intravenous line also known as a PICC line.
- Philippine International Convention Center
- Philippine Independent Catholic Church
- PIC C The C programming language for Microchip's PIC microcontroller
- The short form of the instrument Piccolo
- Presubscribed Interexchange Carrier Charge, an interconnection payment paid between telephone companies in North America
- Principles of International Commercial Contracts, a document attempting to harmonize the international contract law.
- Proximity Integrated Circuit Card; see Proximity card
- Putrajaya International Convention Centre, a convention center in Putrajaya, Malaysia
