= Luke v Lyde =

English legal judgment on the Law of the Sea

Luke v Lyde (1759), 2 Burr 882, 97 ER 614 (KB) is an early judgment on the Law of the Sea.

== Facts of the Case ==
A ship carrying fish from New Foundland to Lisbon, Portugal was captured by the French after 17 days of their voyage. The Sarah was recaptured by an English privateer three days later and taken to Bideford. the defendant received the fish and sold it in Bideford for half its value.

The issue before the court was:

- whether any freight was due to the plaintiffs?
- If any then what freight is due?

== Court Finding ==
Mansfield held that in the present case there was nothing to prevent freight from being due. "Freight became due from and upon the freighters taking the goods into their possession: and continued due, by the defendants not totally abandoning them."

Regarding how much freight was due Mansfield relied on what he termed "the ‘principles’ he instinctively ‘found’ in the common law" and ruled ""The master had come seventeen days of his voyage and was within four days of the destined port when the accident happened. Therefore he ought to be paid his freight for 17/21 parts of the full voyage for that half of the cargo that was saved."

The case is notable for establishing the dicta "that the maritime law is not the law of a particular country, but the general law of nations."

Lord Mansfields reasoning flows out of that the law of the sea began with the Rhodian Code, then the Consolato del Mere, the laws of Hanseatic League the Laws of Wisbuy and Ordinance of Louis 14th. From this Mansfield argues that there exists a set of internationally recognized practices in regard to law of the Sea.

== See also ==
- History of contract law
- English contract law
