= Principles of International Commercial Contracts =

Rules for international contracts

The Principles of International Commercial Contracts 2016 (most frequently referred to as the UNIDROIT Principles and often also referred to as PICC) is a set of 211 rules for international contracts. They have been drawn up since 1984 by an international working group of the inter-governmental organization UNIDROIT, and they were ratified by its Council representing 64 governments of member states.

As soft law, these principles help harmonize international commercial contract law by providing rules supplementing international instruments like the CISG and even national laws. Most importantly in private practice, they offer a neutral contractual regime which the parties can choose, either by incorporation into their contracts (in whole or in parts), or by a straightforward choice of the UNIDROIT Principles (e.g. “This contract is governed by the UNIDROIT Principles of International Commercial Contracts 2016”; in practice such a clause is often combined with an arbitration clause).

The UNIDROIT Principles were first released in 1994, with enlarged editions published in 2004, 2010, and most recently in 2016 (including issues related to long-term contracts). Established with an international mind-set, they address many issues on which national legislators do not concentrate, such as foreign-currency set-off or hardship. Practitioners who use the principles describe them as a state-of-the art tool which is particularly useful when parties from different legal systems desire to agree on a neutral contractual regime. International law firm networks have an increasing number of committees concentrating on promoting the use of the UNIDROIT Principles in practice (e.g. the International Bar Association; Primerus Society of Law Firms).

== Contents ==
- Preamble
- Chapter 1, General Provisions
- Chapter 2, Formation and Authority of Agents
- Chapter 3, Validity
- Chapter 4, Interpretation
- Chapter 5, Content and Third Party Rights
- Chapter 6, Performance
- Chapter 7, Non-Performance
- Chapter 8, Set-off
- Chapter 9, Assignment of rights, transfer of obligations, assignment of contracts
- Chapter 10, Limitation periods
- Chapter 11, Plurality of parties

== See also ==
- Australian contract law
- Canadian contract law
- English contract law
- French contract law
- German contract law
- Principles of European Contract Law of 2003
- Restatement (Second) of Contracts of 1979
- UK commercial law
- Unidroit
- Uniform Commercial Code of 1952
- US contract law
