= French contract law =

French contract law is part of the law of obligations found in the Code Civil dealing with contracts.

It is often analyzed in its two main dimensions, 1) the formation of the contract, and 2) the effects of the contract. The formation of the contract includes the meeting of wills, the content of the contract, and the sanctions of formation. The effects of the contract entail the binding force and the relative effect of the contract, and the breach of the contract.

== See also ==
- English contract law
- US contract law
- German contract law
