= PECL =

The abbreviation PECL can refer to:

- PHP Extension Community Library, a repository of extensions for the PHP programming language
- Positive emitter-coupled logic, a family of digital integrated circuits
- Principles of European Contract Law, a scholarly restatement of the contract law of European legal systems
