= Work permit (Belgium) =

The issuing of work permits in Belgium is partially governed by the transposition of EU law, especially the principle of free movement of labour, and partially by Belgium-specific regulations.

There are three types of work permits for non-EU nationals: type C for students, relationship/family reasons and humanitarian reasons, type B for special categories of work (mostly in the context of training and posting of workers), and type A if you have repeatedly been granted a type B permit.

== Requirements by nationality or status ==
=== Nationals of "old" EU Member States (EU-15 + accession 2004) ===
Nationals of Austria, Cyprus, Czech Republic, Denmark, Estonia, Finland, France, Germany, Greece, Hungary, Ireland, Italy, Latvia, Lithuania, Luxembourg, Malta, Netherlands, Poland, Portugal, Slovakia, Slovenia, Spain, Sweden and the United Kingdom are treated like Belgian workers, i.e. they do not need a work permit.

=== Nationals of "new" EU Member States (Accession 2007) ===
Nationals of Bulgaria and Romania still have to apply for work permits. These transitional restrictions to the Belgian labour market may apply for up to 7 years after the accession (= 1 January 2014). However, those nationals can profit from a fast-track procedure for work permits for professions for which it is officially recognised that labour is short.

=== EU long-term residents ===
Persons who have acquired long-term resident status in Belgium are treated like Belgian workers, i.e. they do not need a work permit.

Persons who have acquired long-term resident status in another EU country can profit from a fast-track procedure for work permits for professions for which it is officially recognised that labour is short.

=== Nationals of countries with which Belgium has special agreements ===
Nationals of successor states of former Yugoslavia (Bosnia-Herzegovina, Croatia, Kosovo, Macedonia, Montenegro and Serbia) and of certain Mediterranean countries (Algeria, Morocco, Tunisia and Turkey) may obtain a work permit type B even if they do not fall under the special categories mentioned there. They can also apply for a work permit type A one year earlier than nationals from other non-EU countries.

== Work permit type C ==
Characteristics:

- Maximum validity period: one year
- Valid for all employers
- Valid for all paid occupations
- Granted to persons whose stay is temporary

The latter applies to

- a student (registered in an education institution in Belgium for full-time studies) who wants to work outside the school holidays, if this employment does not exceed twenty hours per week.
- a person living in cohabitation in the framework of a durable relationship with a partner of EEA nationality (European Economic Area i.e. EU-27 plus Iceland, Liechtenstein and Norway)
  - According to the website diplomatie.belgium.be, this can only be a heterosexual or same-sex couple. The partners have to submit a declaration of statutory cohabitation.
  - However, the website www.belgium.be states that you may as well live in cohabitation with a member of your family or any other person with whom you have a relationship without sexual connotation.
- the spouse or registered partner
  - of an EEA national who is employed in Belgium since at least one year with an open-ended contract
  - of special residence permit holders from the United States, Australia, Canada, New Zealand and Croatia
  - of a diplomat or consul
  - of a non-EEA national whose application for a residence permit (beyond work) or whose request for reconsideration of the decision to refuse the residence permit is being examined
- a non-EEA national's spouse or registered partner who has been granted the right of residence on the basis of Belgian family reunification law (Article 10 of the law of 15/12/1980)
- a non-EEA national's relative in the descending line who has been granted the right of residence on the basis of Belgian family reunification law (Article 10 of the law of 15/12/1980)
- the child (under 18) of a diplomat or consul
- the child of a non-EEA national whose application for a residence permit (beyond work) or whose request for reconsideration of the decision to refuse the residence permit is being examined

and further to

- an applicant for refugee status (asylum seeker)
- a beneficiary of subsidiary protection
- a recognised victim of trade in human beings
- a person authorised to a stay for medical reasons on the basis of Belgian law (Article 9ter of the law of 15/12/1980)
- a person whose prolongation of residence authorisation for humanitarian reasons is depending on employment
- a person staying in the framework of temporary protection

== Work permit type B ==
Characteristics:

- Maximum validity period: one year
- Valid for only one employer
- Employer has to submit the application

For most non-EU nationals, a work permit type B is only granted for special categories of work (mostly in the context of training and posting of workers).

=== Special categories ===
- trainees (= interns, stagiaires)
  - between 18 and 30 years old
  - for a maximum traineeship duration of one year
- au pairs
- highly qualified workers
  - who pay social contributions
  - and whose yearly gross salary in 2010 was higher than 38'665 EUR (2013)
    - highly qualified workers employed by interim agencies usually do not reach this threshold.
- managers
  - who pay social contributions
  - and whose yearly gross salary in 2010 was higher than 60'654 EUR (2011: 61'071 EUR)
- posted highly qualified workers
- posted managers
- researchers
- visiting professors
- specialised technicians posted to Belgium for a maximum of 6 months in order to install/initialise/repair an installation produced or delivered by their employer
- specialised technicians coming to Belgium for professional training
- workers posted to Belgium for professional training
- professional sportspersons
  - at least 18 years old
  - if their yearly gross salary is at least 69'400 EUR
- trainers
  - if their yearly gross salary is at least 69'400 EUR
- posted foreign air carrier workers
- posted foreign tourist office workers
- stage artists
- employees who are nationals of Bulgaria, Romania, of successor states of former Yugoslavia (Bosnia-Herzegovina, Croatia, Kosovo, Macedonia, Montenegro and Serbia), of certain Mediterranean countries (Algeria, Morocco, Tunisia and Turkey) or of OECD countries (e.g. Australia, Canada, South Korea, the United States, Japan, New Zealand) coming for a professional training of more than 3 months at the Belgian site of their multinational employer established in another EEA country
  - For a professional training of less than 3 months, nationals of the countries mentioned above could simply stay as tourists.
- employees who are non-EEA nationals coming for a professional training at the Belgian site of their multinational employer established outside the

=== Nationals of countries with which Belgium has special agreements ===
For persons who belong to none of the special categories mentioned above but are

- nationals of successor states of former Yugoslavia (Bosnia-Herzegovina, Croatia, Kosovo, Macedonia, Montenegro and Serbia) or
- nationals of certain Mediterranean countries (Algeria, Morocco, Tunisia and Turkey),

a work permit type B can also be granted if the employer demonstrates that it was impossible to find an appropriate worker on the Belgian labour market (i.e. EU nationals and long-term residents) within reasonable time. The competent Minister of the Region can grant exceptions for economic or social reasons "in individual cases worthy of consideration". If the application is successful, the employer receives an employment permit for that worker.

- However, few employers bother going to these lengths.
- Also, as immigration-related policies are very politicised in Belgium, the application is usually refused.

=== Fast-track procedure in case of labour shortage ===
The Belgian regions have compiled lists of professions in which labour is short, i.e. where they admit that it is difficult to find an appropriate worker on the Belgian labour market. This comprises professions like secretary, nurse and IT.

- Brussels-Capital region: ACTIRIS
- Flanders: Flemish Service for Employment and Vocational Training (VDAB)
- Wallonia: Forem (Le Forem)
- German-speaking community: Arbeitsamt der Deutschsprachigen Gemeinschaft (ADG)

A fast-track procedure is in force in order to fill these vacancies with

- Nationals of Bulgaria and Romania ("new" EU Member States, accession 2007)
  - List of fast-track procedure professions for Bulgarians and Romanians (undated)
- Persons who have acquired long-term resident status in another EU country

== Work permit type A ==
Characteristics:

- Validity period: unlimited
- Valid for all employers
- Valid for all paid occupations
- Granted to persons who can prove a certain number of completed working years that are covered by a work permit type B, during an uninterrupted residence period of 10 years maximum

The requirements are:

- for nationals of countries that are bound to Belgium through international treaties or agreements on the employment of foreigners: 3 years
  - This period is shortened to 2 years if the spouse or children of the foreign national are legally residing with him/her.
- for all others: 4 years
  - This period is shortened to 3 years if the spouse or children of the foreign national are legally residing with him/her.
    - for some categories, work permit type B is not taken into consideration when applying for work permit type A such as specialized technician, highly skilled worker, post doctoral...
