= Bank guarantee case =

Bürge
- Court: Federal Constitutional Court of Germany
- Decided: 19 October 1993
- Citations: BVerfGE 89, 214, NJW 1994 36

Keywords
- Contract, inequality of bargaining power

The Bank guarantee case or Bürge (19 October 1993) BVerfGE 89, 214 is a German contract law case, concerning the interpretation of private law, and particularly the law of contract, in a way that is compatible with basic human rights principles. It was held that the power of freedom of contract must be interpreted in a way that protects people's genuine (rather than formal) autonomy, in those situations where there is a structural inequality of bargaining power.

== Facts ==
The case concerned a series of claimants, including spouses and children, of a party which had mortgaged the family home, in order to secure a loan from a bank. The banks had required that, in return for the loans, the family would guarantee the debts. The validity of these contracts were challenged.

== Judgment ==
56. In contract law, a just balance of interests results from a concurrence of wills among the contracting parties. Both bind themselves and in doing so protect their own individual freedom of action. If one contracting party has such a strong presence that he can factually determine the contract’s content unilaterally, this means that the other party loses autonomy (cf. BVerfGE 81, 242 [255]). Admittedly, the legal order cannot envisage all situations where negotiating parity is more or less compromised. For reasons of legal certainty a contract cannot be brought into question or be corrected with every disruption of negotiating parity. However, in cases of typical types, where one party to a contract may be recognised as being structurally weaker, and if the consequences for the weaker contracting party are significantly imbalanced, the civil law order must react and make correction possible. This follows from the fundamental guarantee of private autonomy (Article 2(1) GG) and the principle of the social state (Article 20(1), Article 28(1) GG).

[...]

59. [...] If the content of a contract is significantly onerous and obviously unreasonable as a balance of interests, a court may not content itself with the conclusion that: “contract is contract”. On the contrary, it must clarify whether the provision is the consequence of structurally unequal bargaining strength, and where appropriate make correction within the framework of the general principles of the civil law.

== See also ==
- Barclays Bank plc v O’Brien [1994] 1 AC 180
