= Gold-plating (EU law) =

Type of domestic implementation of EU directives

Gold-plating is a term used to characterise the process whereby the powers of an EU directive are extended when being transposed into the national laws of a member state.

In an operational study relating to the European Agricultural Fund for Rural Development, the European Commission treats gold-plating as a source of interference with policy outcomes, defining gold-plating as "an excess of norms, guidelines and procedures accumulated at national, regional and local levels, which interfere with the expected policy goals to be achieved by such regulation". Business lobbyists generally argue against gold-plating, because additional regulation tends to raise costs for businesses, but there are a few companies who stand to benefit from it.

In case of gold-plating, the European Court of Justice does in fact have jurisdiction to interpret EU law, even if the case at hand is not directly governed by EU law.

== Examples ==
The UK Department for Business, Innovation and Skills gave the Agency Workers Regulations 2010 as an example of gold-plated EU legislation, because it had granted temporary workers the right to performance-related bonuses, something that was not in the original EU law, which dealt with "the right to the same pay as permanent staff".

In Italy, gold-plating has often been used as a device to pass through controversial measures and to ensure a lower degree of parliamentary scrutiny, particularly in periods of weak government.

== Reform ==
EU governments committed themselves to a deregulation agenda at the Lisbon Summit in March 2000, and as a consequence, the European Commission has supported more maximum harmonisation measures in recent years, which effectively prohibit gold-plating.

Within the UK, the 2010 coalition agreement included a pledge to end gold-plating; the original policy guidelines were finalised in June 2011. Specifically, they stipulate that all EU legislation be reviewed every five years by "all departments...to ensure that they are only implementing the absolute minimum regulation necessary to comply". The principle of copying out the text of European directives directly into UK law was adopted in 2010, along with avoiding transposition into UK law earlier than the date specified in the relevant directive, unless there were "compelling reasons" for earlier implementation. Previously, a 2006 review of gold-plating by Lord Davidson QC found that some EU laws had indeed been "over-implemented", but Lord Davidson had cautioned against "copying out the text of a directive".

== See also ==
- Minimum harmonisation
- Transposition (law)
