= Obligatio consensu =

Type of contract in Roman law

Consensu or obligatio consensu or obligatio consensu contracta or obligations ex consensu or contractus ex consensu or contracts consensu or consensual contracts or obligations by consent are, in Roman law, those contracts which do not require formalities.

These contracts were formed by the mere consent of the parties, there being no requirement for any writing or formalities, nor even for the presence of the parties. Such contracts were bilateral, that is to say, they bound both parties to them. Such contracts depended on the ius gentium for their validity and were enforced by praetorian actions, bonae fidei, and not by actions stricti juris, as were the contracts which depended on the classical ius civile of Rome. The term consensual does not mean that the consent of the parties is more emphatically given than in other forms of agreement, but it indicates that the obligation is annexed at once to the consensus, in the contracts of this type.

Justinian's Institutes classify the following contracts as ex consensu: emptio venditio, locatio conductio, societas and mandatum.

== Emptio venditio ==
Emptio venditio is a contract of sale. This contract derives its force from the consent of the parties. If, however, they agree to reduce the terms of the contract to writing, then the contract is not complete until it is fully committed to writing. If earnest money (arrha) had been given, this was forfeited to the seller if the buyer breaches the contract, and double the value of the earnest money was forfeited by the seller if he breaches the contract. The earnest money was considered only as evidence of the contract.

There must be a price fixed and certain for every sale, and this price must consist of a sum of money.

A sale of a thing at a price to be fixed by a third person is valid if the person does fix a price. The price must be in money otherwise the contract is one of permutatio. This was the view held by the Proculeans, the Sabinians considering it to be venditio.

The seller in a contract of sale had to guarantee the buyer free, undisturbed and lawful possession of the thing sold, and to secure him against latent faults.

The buyer was bound to put the seller in legal possession of the purchase money.

The contract of sale is completed by the consent of the parties; after this, the thing sold is at the risk of the buyer, who also obtained the advantage of any increase to the object.

The actual transfer of the dominium ('ownership') in the thing, that is, the conveyance, as distinguished from the contract, was completed by the delivery of the legal possession of the thing to the buyer.

A sale might be made absolutely or subject to a condition. Accessory contracts modifying the principal one were termed pacta ('pacts').

If the seller disposed of a thing that was not in commercio, such as a temple or a religious place, he was liable to the buyer for any loss that the latter might have incurred by the error. A stipulator in a similar case would have had no remedy.

If the price was less than half the value of the thing sold, the seller might rescind the contract unless the buyer agreed to make up the deficiency. This was termed laesio enormis (or laesio ultra dimidium).

If the object sold was totally unfit for the purpose intended, the buyer might bring an action for rescission – the actio redhibitoria.

If the object possessed some defect which diminished its value, the buyer could bring the actio quanti minoris within one year; by this he obtained a corresponding reduction in price.

=== Confusion of contract and conveyance ===
Austin said:

Rights in rem sometimes arise from an instrument which is called a contract, and are, therefore, said to arise from a contract; the instrument in these cases wears a double aspect or has a twofold effect: to one purpose it gives jus in personam and is a contract, to another purpose it gives jus in rem and is a conveyance.

For example, by English law, the sale of a specific movable is a conveyance and transfers the right in rem.

== Locatio conductio ==
This is a letting to hire. This contract closely resembles that of emptio venditio: it was complete by the mere consent of the parties, after which the letter had an actio locati for the hire, while the hirer's remedy was the actio conducti.

The locatio conductio might be:

- Locatio conductio rei: when one person let, and another hired, a thing; e.g. rental or tenancy (leasehold).
- Locatio conductio operarum: when one let his services, and another hired them; e.g. employment or indentured servitude.
- Locatio conductio operis (faciendi): where the letter contracted for a piece of work being done, and the hirer undertook to do the work; e.g. service contract or building contract (subcontracting).

In the case of leased land, the landlord could take farm implements and other property of the tenant by the actio Serviana.

The following contracts cannot properly be ranked as examples of locatio conductio:

- If the price of the hiring is not fixed, the contract is not locatio conductio, but affords grounds for an action praescriptis verbis.
- If the consideration for the hiring was not a sum of money, but a loan for use (commodatum) granted to the letter, then this was regarded not as a locatio, but as a transaction involving two loans, and an actio praescriptis verbis would be the remedy of either party.

The contract of emphyteusis, or perpetual lease at a fixed rent, which resembles both locatio conductio and emptio venditio, was placed by Zeno in a class by itself.

If a man agrees to make certain objects for another, this amounts to emptio venditio if he provides the materials, but if the materials are provided by the other, then the contract is a locatio.

=== Rule as to the hirer's liability ===
The hirer was bound to take the greatest care of the thing hired, the same care as the most prudent pater familias would of his property.

If the thing is stolen, the hirer is liable; if taken vi, that is, by superior force, he is not liable.

=== Termination and succession ===
The contract is terminated by the rent being two years in arrears in the case of land, by the misuse of the object hired, or by the death of a person from whom personal services are due.

The heir succeeds to all the rights of a deceased hirer; the sale of the object, however, ended the contract, and the remedy of the hirer or his heir was only a personal action against the letter and not, as in the case of his having the usufruct, a real action.

== Societas ==
Societas is partnership. A partnership may be formed either universally, when all the goods of the contracting parties are included in the partnership, or for a particular undertaking.

Partners (socii) share the gains and losses equally, unless there is an agreement to the contrary; such an agreement would be valid.

Partnership is ended:

- By the withdrawal of any one of the partners. If, however, in the case of a universal partnership, a partner withdrew for the purpose of taking an inheritance or other gain in fraud of his co-partners, he would have to divide this with the others.
- By the death of one of the partners. If there are more than two partners, the death of one dissolves the whole partnership, unless an agreement to the contrary is made previously.
- By the accomplishment of the business for which the partnership was formed.
- By the confiscation or forced sale (publicatio or cessio bonorum) of the goods of one of the partners.

=== Forms of partnership ===
- Societas universorum bonorum: universal partnership in which all the property of all the partners is held in common.
- Societas universorum quae ex quaestu veniunt (societas quaestus et compendii): only for trade purposes; trade property only was held by the partners in common.
- Societas negotiationis alicujus: to carry out a particular enterprise or a special business.
- Societas vectigalis: to farm the public revenues.
- Societas rei unius: where a special object is owned in common.

=== Liability of the partners among themselves ===
A partner was bound to use the same care in dealing with the goods belonging to the partnership as he used in the management of his own affairs. The remedy between partners was the actio pro socio, for all cases which did not fall within the actions, such as those furti, vi bonorum raptorum, etc.

Partnerships were limited to gains in commerce, unless there was an agreement to the contrary.

A partnership in which one partner took all the gains was styled leonina, and was deemed invalid. See Poste's Gaius, p 426.

== Mandatum ==
Mandatum is gratuitous agency. By the old and strict Roman law, one person could not in theory represent another, but the contract of mandatum was an exception. The execution of a mandatum was the gratuitous performance of an act for another, the rights of both the mandator ('principal') and the mandatary ('agent') being amply protected by the praetors.

A mandate might be for the benefit of the mandator only. For example: a mandate granted by A to B to buy an estate or transact business for A, or for the benefit of the mandatary and the mandator. For example: A mandate from a debtor to a creditor enabling the latter to stipulate for a debt due to the former. The debtor thus gets what is due to him collected, and the creditor has two persons to whom to apply for his money. Or, for the benefit of a third party; as, for example, if A manages the affairs of B in pursuance of a mandate from C. Or, for the benefit of the mandatary and a third party: for example, if A lends money to B at interest in pursuance of a mandate from C. But, mandate made for the benefit of the mandatary only is considered merely as a piece of advice from the mandator (or magis consilium est quam mandatum).

A mandate contra bonos mores is not obligatory.

If the terms of the mandate are exceeded, the mandator is only responsible for what is authorized by the mandate.

A mandate can be revoked before it has been performed. It is extinguished by the death of the mandator or mandatary; however, if the mandator's death is unknown to the mandatary he can still bring the actio mandati.

A mandate once accepted must be executed, unless some just cause supervenes to release the mandatary.

A mandate may be made conditionally, or so as to take effect from a future time.

Though the services were performed gratuitously under the contract, it was open to the benefited party to present the other with an honorarium for his services.

== Quotes ==
- Re, verbis, scripto, consensu, traditione, junctura vestes sumere pacta solent.

Compacts are accustomed to take their clothing from the subject matter, the words, the writing, the delivery and the consent or joining together.

- Scriptae obligationes scriptis tolluntur, et nudi consensus obligatio contrario consensu dissolvitur.

Written obligations are released or discharged by writings, and an obligation of mere consent is dissolved or discharged by a consent to the contrary.

== See also ==
- History of contract law
- Ius privatum
- Law of obligations

== General and cited references ==
- Amos, Sheldon (1883). The History and Principles of the Civil Law of Rome. London: Kegan Paul, Trench & Co. pp. 222–244, 367.
- Campbell, Gordon (1892). A Compendium of Roman Law, 2nd ed. Bell Yard, Temple Bar, London: Stevens and Haynes.
- Maine, Henry Sumner (1861). Ancient Law: Its Connection with the Early History of Society, and Its Relations to Modern Ideas. London: John Murray, p. 333.
