= Cautelary jurisprudence =

Cautelary jurisprudence is law made in a precautionary way prior to or outside of the normal legislative enactment. It meant empirical, practical legal efforts aimed at solving individual cases, as distinguished from regular jurisprudence which sought to establish abstract rules under which individual cases would fall.

Cautelary law is a tentative "procedure" used by lawyers. Initially, in Ancient Rome, the idea of inheritance as being subject to conditions was not in practice. With cautio muciana it gave those who are to inherit a legacy, the legatees, a "negative authority" over something which otherwise would not have occurred until the death of the owner of the legacy, the legator.

The legatee provides a stipulatio or cautio, promising something in return for a legacy. Thus, for example, it may be stipulated in the negative, "I agree that I can have full and exclusive use of, and live in the house, so long as I am not married."

Cautelary jurisprudence nowadays is associated with inheritance law and the administration of trusts. The various inventions by lawyers of these new, arrangements, or forms of law, are often enacted outside of nation or state legislature, but with agreement amongst other lawyers and/or judges.

== See also ==
- Rule of law
- Rule According to Higher Law
