= Harvey McGregor =

British barrister and academic

Harvey McGregor CBE QC
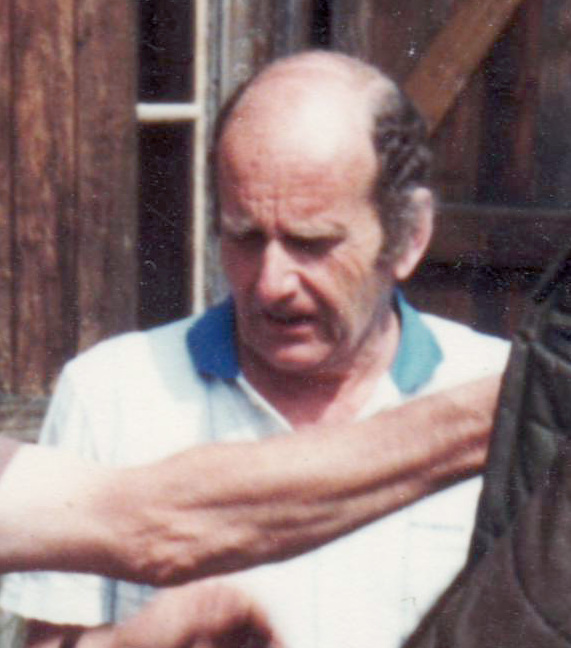
- McGregor in 1983

Warden of New College, Oxford
- In office 1985–1996
- Preceded by: Arthur Hafford Cooke
- Succeeded by: Alan Ryan

Personal details
- Born: 25 February 1926
- Died: 27 June 2015 (aged 89)
- Education: Inverurie Academy; Scarborough High School for Boys
- Alma mater: The Queen's College, Oxford

Harvey McGregor CBE QC (25 February 1926 – 27 June 2015) was a British barrister and academic, who was Warden of New College, Oxford from 1985 to 1996.

== Early life ==
The son of William Guthrie Robertson McGregor and Agnes McGregor (née Reid), McGregor was educated at Inverurie Academy, Scarborough High School, and Queen's College, Oxford, where he held the Hastings Scholarship and graduated BA in 1951, BCL in 1952, MA in 1955, and DCL in 1983.

Before going up to Oxford, McGregor served as a Flying Officer in the Royal Air Force for two years, from 1946 to 1948.

== Career ==
McGregor was called to the bar from the Inner Temple in 1955 and became a Bencher in 1985. He was admitted to the Faculty of Advocates in 1995.

He was Bigelow teaching Fellow in the University of Chicago, 1950–1951, Visiting professor at New York University and Rutgers University at various times between 1963 and 1969 and at the University of Edinburgh from 1998. He was a consultant to the Law Commission, 1966–1973.

President, Harvard Law School Association of the UK, 1981–2001, and Member of the Academy of European Private Lawyers, from 1994. Independent Chairman, London Theatre Council and The Theatre Council (formerly Provincial Theatre Council), from 1992 (and Deputy Chairman, 1971–1992). President, Oxford Stage Company, from 1992, and Trustee of the Oxford Union Society, 1977 to 2004 (Chairman of Trustees, 1994–2004), a Fellow of Winchester College, 1985 to 1996, and a Trustee of the Migraine Trust since 1999.

McGregor was appointed Commander of the Order of the British Empire (CBE) in the 2014 New Year Honours for services to law and education. He died at the age of 89 on 27 June 2015.

== Selected publications ==
- McGregor on Damages (12th Edition published 1961 to 20th Edition Published 2017)
- Contract Code (1993)
- contributor to International Encyclopedia of Comparative Law (1972)

At the Modern Law Review, McGregor was a member of the editorial board since 1986 and was previously a member of the Editorial Committee from 1967.

The Law Commission, together with the Scots Law Commission, asked McGregor to produce a proposal for the codification and union of the contract law of England and Scotland, which are based in Common Law. He did so in Contract Code (1993). This work was not adopted by either Law Commission, so McGregor got it published by an Italian University. His proposals include, inter alia, the abandonment of the English doctrine of consideration. Shortly after publication, the European Commission expressed an interest in the "Contract Code" as the basis for an EU-wide law of contract, but eventually chose not to adopt it. Instead, the EU has looked more kindly on a document, "Principles of European Contract Law", created by the self-styled Commission on European Contract Law (a group of leading contract law academics). In the meantime, the EU passed the Rome I Regulation, Rome II Regulation and the Rome III Regulation, all of which have had a mixed reception in English legal circles.
