= Just price =

Theory of ethics in economics

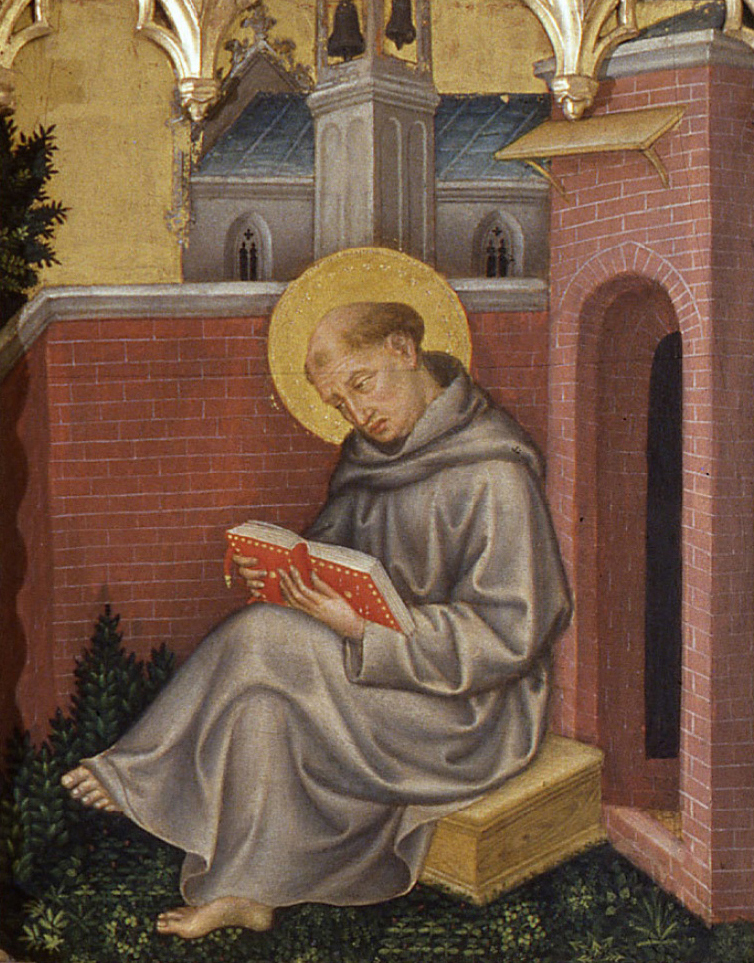
St. Thomas Aquinas taught that raising prices in response to high demand was a type of theft.

The just price is a theory of ethics in economics that attempts to set standards of fairness in transactions. With intellectual roots in ancient Greek philosophy, it was advanced by St. Thomas Aquinas based on an argument against usury, which in his time referred to the making of any rate of interest on loans. It gave rise to the contractual principle of laesio enormis.

== Unjust price: a kind of fraud ==
The argument against usury was that the lender was receiving income for nothing, since nothing was actually lent, rather the money was exchanged. Furthermore, a dollar can only be fairly exchanged for a dollar, so asking for more is unfair. Aquinas later expanded his argument to oppose any unfair earnings made in trade, basing the argument on the Golden Rule. The Christian should "do unto others as you would have them do unto you", meaning he should trade value for value. Aquinas believed that it was specifically immoral to raise prices because a particular buyer had an urgent need for what was being sold and could be persuaded to pay a higher price because of local conditions:

If someone would be greatly helped by something belonging to someone else, and the seller not similarly harmed by losing it, the seller must not sell for a higher price: because the usefulness that goes to the buyer comes not from the seller, but from the buyer's needy condition: no one ought to sell something that doesn't belong to him.

— Summa Theologiae, 2-2, q. 77, art. 1

Aquinas would therefore condemn practices such as raising the price of building supplies in the wake of a natural disaster. Increased demand caused by the destruction of existing buildings does not add to a seller's costs, so to take advantage of buyers' increased willingness to pay constituted a species of fraud in Aquinas's view.

Aquinas believed all gains made in trade must relate to the labour exerted by the merchant, not to the need of the buyer. Hence, he condoned moderate gain as payment even for unnecessary trade, provided the price were regulated and kept within certain bounds:

...there is no reason why gain [from trading] may not be directed to some necessary or even honourable end; and so trading will be rendered lawful; as when a man uses moderate gains acquired in trade for the support of his household, or even to help the needy...

== Later reinterpretations of the doctrine ==
=== School of Salamanca ===
With their reflexions on Contract law and fairness in exchange, the members of the School of Salamanca were often confronted with the notion of just price.

The just price of something, which respects the principle of commutative justice, depends on many factors. It have a certain latitude because it's not the result of God's will or of labor but of the common estimation of the people (communis aestimatio hominum). On this Luis Saravia de la Calle wrote in 1544:

Those who measure the just price by the labour, costs, and risk incurred by the person who deals in the merchandise or produces it, or by the cost of transport or the expense of traveling...or by what he has to pay the factors for their industry, risk, and labour, are greatly in error.... For the just price arises from the abundance or scarcity of goods, merchants, and money...and not from costs, labour, and risk.... Why should a bale of linen brought overland from Brittany at great expense be worth more than one which is transported cheaply by sea?... Why should a book written out by hand be worth more than one which is printed, when the latter is better though it costs less to produce?... The just price is found not by counting the cost but by the common estimation.

However, as this quote might suggest, the just price isn't always the market price. The members of the School of Salamanca thought that authorities were sometimes required to intervene and to control prices, especially in monopoly cases or for staples.

Every violation of the just price constitutes a laesio for one, and an unjust enrichment, an infraction to the seventh Commandment and a sin for the other. Only a restitution of the undue price enables the absolution and bring back the contractual equilibrium.

== Islam ==
Ibn Taymiyyah (1263 –1328) elaborated a circumstantial analysis of market mechanism, with a theoretical insight unusual in his time. Regarding the power of supply and demand, Ibn Taymiyya said, "If desire for goods increases while its availability decreases, its price rises. On the other hand, if availability of the good increases and the desire for it decreases, the price comes down." His discourses on the welfare advantages and disadvantages of market regulation and deregulation, have an almost contemporary ring to them.

However, he also advocated a policy of "fair prices" and "fair profits", with the implication that anything higher would be impious. Such forms of price fixing was detrimental to entrepreneurship. He argued that trade and commerce should be conducted in a fair and just manner, and that individuals had a responsibility to treat their customers and business partners with honesty and integrity. He believed that the principles of Islamic economics were designed to promote economic growth and prosperity while ensuring social justice and fairness.

== Capitalism ==
With the rise of capitalism, the use of just price theory faded, largely replaced by the microeconomic concept of supply and demand from Locke, Steuart, Ricardo, and especially Adam Smith. In modern economics regarding returns to the means of production, interest is seen as payment for a valuable service, which is the use of the money, though most banking systems still forbid excessive interest rates.

Likewise, during the rapid expansion of capitalism over the past several centuries the theory of the just price was used to justify popular action against merchants who raised their prices in years of dearth. The Marxist historian E. P. Thompson emphasized the continuing force of this tradition in his article on the "Moral Economy of the English Crowd in the Eighteenth Century." Other historians and sociologists have uncovered the same phenomenon in variety of other situations including peasants riots in continental Europe during the nineteenth century and in many developing countries in the twentieth. The political scientist James C. Scott, for example, showed how this ideology could be used as a method of resisting authority in The Moral Economy of the Peasant: Subsistence and Rebellion in Southeast Asia.

== Laesio enormis ==
Although the Imperial Roman Code, the Corpus Juris Civilis had stated that the parties to an exchange were entitled to try to outwit one another, the view developed that a contract could be unwound if it was significantly detrimental to one party: if there were abnormal harm (laesio enormis). This meant that if an agreement was significantly imbalanced to the detriment of one party, the courts would decline to enforce it, and have jurisdiction to reverse unjust enrichment. Through the 19th century, the codifications in France and Germany declined to adopt the principle while common law jurisdictions attempted to generalise the doctrine of freedom of contract. However, in practice, and increasingly over the 20th century and early 21st century, the law of consumer protection, tenancy contracts, and labour law was regulated by statute to require fairness in exchange. Certain terms would be compulsory, others would be regarded as unfair, and courts could substitute their judgment for what would be just in all the circumstances.

=== Modern law ===
- Bundesgerichtshof Entscheidung (24 January 1979), the billiards equipment, NJW 1979, 758
- Bundesgerichtshof Entscheidung (12 March 1981), the disproportionate loan, BGHZ 80, 153
- Bürgerliches Gesetzbuch §138, transactions contrary to public policy; usury
- Austrian Civil Code §934
- French Civil Code articles 1674-5
- Vernon v Bethell (1762) 28 ER 838
- Consumer Credit Act 1974 ss 140A-B
- National Minimum Wage Act 1998
- Louisiana Civil Code article 2589

== See also ==
- Adverse selection
- Bargaining
- Bargaining power
- Capital market imperfections
- Catholic social teaching
- Coercive monopoly
- Economic ethics
- History of economic thought
- Inequality of bargaining power
- Labor theory of value
- Price
- Pricing
- Supply and demand
- Usury
