= Minimum harmonisation =

Term used in EU law

Minimum harmonisation is a term used in European Union law describing a piece of law (usually a directive but occasionally a regulation) that sets a threshold national legislation must meet. EU Member State national legislation may exceed the terms of minimum harmonisation law.

Much EU legislation has been implemented on a minimum harmonization basis as it can be easier to reach agreement, allowing existing EU Member State national legislation on issues such as consumer protection or the environment to remain in place.

In more recent years, the burden of EU law has led to calls for deregulation and accusations that some member states indulge in protectionism when implementing directives into EU Member State national law by gold-plating. Therefore, on the opposite end of the regulation spectrum, a growing minority of EU law contains maximum harmonisation provisions.

It is quite common for a directive or recommendation to consist of a mixture of minimum harmonisation and maximum harmonisation clauses.
