= European Centre of Tort and Insurance Law =

Coordinates: 48.21394°N 16.35900°E

Since November 2000 the European Centre of Tort and Insurance Law (ECTIL), based in Vienna, has been an association whose purpose is

- to conduct legal and comparative research in the field of national, international and common European tort and insurance law
- to draft Principles for a future harmonisation of European Tort and insurance law in co-operation with the European Group on Tort Law
- to co-operate with scholars and research institutions in the field of tort and insurance law and with undertakings and co-operations interested in joint research projects.

== Principles of European Tort Law ==
The unification of European tort and insurance law is the most ambitious goal which the founders of the European Centre of Tort and Insurance Law, the European Group on Tort Law, pursue in cooperation with ECTIL. The broadly-based comparative research resulted in the drafting of “Principles of European Tort Law”, which provide a foundation for discussing a future harmonisation of the law of tort in the European Union. Further, the "Principles" shall form a stimulus for both academics and practitioners and could serve as a guideline for national legal systems, thereby leading to gradual legal harmonisation. Finally, the present isolated tort law regulations, which are at times themselves contradictory, require a uniform concept from the European Union.

The European Group on Tort Law spent more than a decade on preparatory works for the "Principles". These studies have been published in the series "Principles of European Tort Law". The “Principles of European Tort Law” themselves have also already been released in print, accompanied by a commentary and several translations. The online version of the "Principles" in several languages can be found on the Group's website at [www.egtl.org.]

== Other research projects ==
In addition to the "Principles", ECTIL has also undertaken several projects of its own. The topics range from fundamental questions, e.g. non-pecuniary or pure economic loss, to the relationship between tort law and related schemes such as liability insurance or social security, from several studies in the health-care sector to compensation for victims of terrorism.

The results are published in ECTIL's series "Tort and Insurance Law". Most projects are also discussed at international conferences at various European locations.

== Collaboration ==
Due to the international nature of the research undertaken by ECTIL, close bonds have been formed with both academics and practitioners whose contributions are vital to the study of the respective legal system. While ECTIL co-operates with several other European research institutions, its closest partner is the Institute for European Tort Law (ETL), founded in 2002 as a Research Unit of the Austrian Academy of Sciences and converted into an Academy Institute in 2008. Not only do both institutions share offices and library, but they also draw from their mutual network of researchers built up over the years. ECTIL and ETL have thereby established a think tank of more than 160 researchers in over 40 countries, including all jurisdictions of the European Union, as well as Norway, Switzerland, Israel, South Africa, Japan and the United States of America.

== Annual Conference on European Tort Law (ACET) ==
The Annual Conference on European Tort Law (ACET) is held in Vienna every year and provides both practitioners and academics with the opportunity to learn of the most significant recent developments in tort law within Europe in each calendar year preceding the conference.

Experts from all over Europe present the highlights of their contributions to the European Tort Law Yearbook, which is published after each conference. The reporters provide a comprehensive overview of the previous year's court practice and legislation in the respective jurisdictions. Furthermore, an overview of the developments in the field of EU law is provided. A comparative analysis reviews the essential aspects of all reports. In addition to those national reports, the conference features special presentations on current issues of tort law. For further information and the date of the next conference see acet.ectil.org

== Publications ==
=== Tort and Insurance Law Series ===
- Volume 1: Cases on Medical Malpractice in a Comparative Perspective. Edited by Michael Faure and Helmut Koziol. Springer, Vienna/New York. Softcover. ISBN 3-211-83595-4. 2001, 331 pp.
- Volume 2: Damages for Non-Pecuniary Loss in a Comparative Perspective. Edited by W.V. Horton Rogers. Springer, Vienna/New York. Softcover. ISBN 3-211-83602-0. 2001, 318 pp.
- Volume 3: The Impact of Social Security on Tort Law. Edited by Ulrich Magnus. Springer, Vienna/New York. Softcover. ISBN 3-211-83795-7. 2003, 312 pp.
- Volume 4: Compensation for Personal Injury in a Comparative perspective. Edited by Bernhard A. Koch and Helmut Koziol. Springer, Vienna/New York. Softcover. ISBN 3-211-83791-4. 2003, 501 pp.
- Volume 5: Deterrence, Insurability and Compensation in Environmental Liability. Future Developments in the European Union. Edited by Michael Faure. Springer, Vienna/New York. Softcover. ISBN 3-211-83863-5. 2003, 405 pp.
- Volume 6: Der Ersatz frustrierter Aufwendungen. Vermögens- und Nichtvermögensschaden im österreichischen und deutschen Recht. By Thomas Schobel. Springer, Vienna/New York. Softcover. ISBN 3-211-83877-5. 2003, 342 pp.
- Volume 7: Liability for and Insurability of Biomedical Research with Human Subjects in a Comparative Perspective. Edited by Jos Dute, Michael G. Faure and Helmut Koziol. Springer, Vienna/New York. Softcover. ISBN 3-211-20098-3. 2004, 445 pp.
- Volume 8: No-Fault Compensation in the Health Care Sector. Edited by Jos Dute, Michael G. Faure, Helmut Koziol. Springer, Vienna/New York. Softcover. ISBN 3-211-20799-6. 2004, 492 pp.
- Volume 9: Pure Economic Loss. Edited by Willem H. van Boom, Helmut Koziol and Christian A. Witting. Springer, Vienna/New York. Softcover. ISBN 3-211-00514-5. 2003, 214 pp.
- Volume 10: Liber Amicorum Pierre Widmer. Edited by Helmut Koziol and Jaap Spier. Springer, Vienna/New York. Softcover. ISBN 3-211-00522-6. 2003, 376 pp.
- Volume 11: Terrorism, Tort Law and Insurance. A Comparative Survey. Edited by Bernhard A. Koch. Springer, Vienna/New York. Softcover. ISBN 3-211-01867-0. 2004, 313 pp.
- Volume 12: Abschlussprüfer. Haftung und Versicherung. Edited by Helmut Koziol and Walter Doralt. Springer, Vienna/New York. Softcover. ISBN 3-211-20800-3. 2004, 180 pp.
- Volume 13: Persönlichkeitsschutz gegenüber Massenmedien/The Protection of Personality Rights against Invasions by Mass Media. Edited by Helmut Koziol and Alexander Warzilek. Springer, Vienna/New York. Softcover. ISBN 3-211-23835-2. 2005, 713 pp.
- Volume 14: Financial Compensation for Victims of Catastrophes. Edited by Michael Faure and Ton Hartlief. Springer, Vienna/New York. Softcover. ISBN 3-211-24481-6. 2006, 466 pp.
- Volume 15: Entwurf eines neuen österreichischen Schadenersatzrechts. Edited by Irmgard Griss, Georg Kathrein and Helmut Koziol. Springer, Vienna/New York. Softcover. ISBN 3-211-30827-X. 2006, 146 pp.
- Volume 16: Tort Law and Liability Insurance. Edited by Gerhard Wagner. Springer, Vienna/New York. Softcover. ISBN 3-211-24482-4. 2005, 361 pp.
- Volume 17: Children in Tort Law. Part I: Children as Tortfeasors. Edited by Miquel Martín-Casals. Springer, Vienna/New York. Softcover. ISBN 3-211-24480-8. 2006, 476 pp.
- Volume 18: Children in Tort Law. Part II: Children as Victims. Edited by Miquel Martín-Casals. Springer, Vienna/New York. Softcover. ISBN 3-211-31130-0. 2007, 320 pp.
- Volume 19: Tort and Regulatory Law. Edited by Willem H. van Boom, Meinhard Lukas and Christa Kissling. Springer, Vienna/New York. Hardcover. ISBN 978-3-211-31133-2. 2007, approx. 500 pp.
- Volume 20: Shifts in Compensating Work-Related Injuries and Diseases. Edited by Saskia Klosse and Ton Hartlief. Springer, Vienna/New York. Hardcover. ISBN 978-3-211-71555-0. 2007, 236 pp.
- Volume 21: Shifts in Compensation for Environmental Damage. Edited by Michael Faure and Albert Verheij. Springer, Vienna/New York. Hardcover. ISBN 978-3-211-71551-2. 2007, 338 pp.
- Volume 22: Shifts in Compensation between Private and Public Systems. Edited by Willem H. van Boom and Michael Faure. Springer, Vienna/New York. Hardcover. ISBN 978-3-211-71553-6. 2007, 246 pp.
- Volume 23: Tort Law of the European Community. Edited by Helmut Koziol and Reiner Schulze. Springer, Vienna/New York. Hardcover. ISBN 978-3-211-77585-1. 2008, 693 pp.
- Volume 24: Economic Loss Caused by Genetically Modified Organisms. Liability and Redress for the Adventitious Presence of GMOs in Non-GM Crops. Edited by Bernhard A. Koch. Springer, Vienna/New York. Hardcover. ISBN 978-3-211-77987-3. 2008, 760 pp.
- Volume 25: Punitive Damages: Common Law and Civil Law Perspectives. Edited by Helmut Koziol and Vanessa Wilcox. Springer, Vienna/New York. Hardcover. ISBN 978-3-211-92210-1. 2009, 335 pp.
- Volume 26: Aggregation and Divisibility of Damage. Edited by Ken Oliphant. Springer, Vienna/New York. Hardcover. ISBN 978-3-211-92208-8. 2009, 568 pp.
- Volume 27: Damage Caused by Genetically Modified Organisms. Comparative Survey of Redress Options for Harm to Persons, Property or the Environment. Edited by Bernhard A . Koch. de Gruyter, Berlin. Hardcover. ISBN 978-3-89949-811-0. 2010, 954 pp.
- Volume 28: Loss of Housekeeping Capacity. Edited by Ernst Karner and Ken Oliphant. de Gruyter, Berlin. Hardcover. ISBN 978-3-89949-813-4. 2011.
- Volume 29: Medical Liability in Europe. A Comparison of Selected Jurisdictions. Edited by Bernhard A . Koch. de Gruyter, Berlin. Hardcover. ISBN 978-3-11-026010-6. 2011, 700 pp.

=== European Tort Law Yearbook ===
- European Tort Law 2001. Edited by Helmut Koziol and Barbara C. Steininger. Springer, Vienna/New York. Softcover. ISBN 3-211-83824-4. 2002, 571 pp.
- European Tort Law 2002. Edited by Helmut Koziol and Barbara C. Steininger. Springer, Vienna/New York. Softcover. ISBN 3-211-00486-6. 2003, 596 pp.
- European Tort Law 2003. Edited by Helmut Koziol and Barbara C. Steininger. Springer, Vienna/New York. Softcover. ISBN 3-211-21033-4. 2004, 493 pp.
- European Tort Law 2004. Edited by Helmut Koziol and Barbara C. Steininger. Springer, Vienna/New York. Softcover. ISBN 3-211-24479-4. 2005, 674 pp.
- European Tort Law 2005. Edited by Helmut Koziol and Barbara C. Steininger. Springer, Vienna/New York. Softcover. ISBN 3-211-31135-1. 2006, 711 pp.
- European Tort Law 2006. Edited by Helmut Koziol and Barbara C. Steininger. Springer, Vienna/New York. Hardcover. ISBN 978-3-211-70937-5. 2007, 576 pp.
- European Tort Law 2007. Edited by Helmut Koziol and Barbara C. Steininger. Springer, Vienna/New York. Hardcover. ISBN 978-3-211-77991-0. 2008, 661 pp.
- European Tort Law 2008. Edited by Helmut Koziol and Barbara C. Steininger. Springer, Vienna/New York. Hardcover. ISBN 978-3-211-92797-7. 2009, 708 pp.
- European Tort Law 2009. Edited by Helmut Koziol and Barbara C. Steininger. de Gruyter, Berlin. Hardcover. ISBN 978-3-11-024606-3. 2010, 735 pp.

=== Principles of European Tort Law ===
- Text and Commentary. Edited by the European Group on Tort Law. Springer, Vienna/New York. Softcover. ISBN 3-211-23084-X. 2005, 282 pp.

=== Journal ===
- Journal of European Tort Law. ISSN 1868-9612 (Print), ISSN 1868-9620 (Online). de Gruyter
