= Hydrocarbons Directive 1994 =

Authorized diffirent methods of Hydrocarbon Extraction

Directive 94/22/EC
- European Union directive
- Title: Hydrocarbons Directive 1994
- Made by: European Parliament and Council

The Hydrocarbons Directive 1994 (94/22/EC) is a Directive in EU law that sets out conditions for authorising oil and gas drilling, fracking or other extraction of hydrocarbons in the EU.

== Contents ==
Article 1 sets out definitions for competent authorities that should authorise corporate or public entities that drill or extract gas, oil or other hydrocarbons.

Article 2 prevents discrimination between oil firms as ‘regards access to and exercise of... prospecting, exploring for and producing hydrocarbons’.

Article 3(2)(a) requires that publication of opportunities to apply to drill, frack or extract hydrocarbons must go into the Official Journal, and (b) with 90 days notice if there is a sale out of ordinary rounds.

Article 4(c) requires no geographical monopolies for longer than necessary.

Article 5 requires authorisations are granted based on technical and financial capability, the method of prospecting and the ability to pay.

Article 6(2) states that "Member States may, to the extent justified by national security, public safety, public health, security of transport, protection of the environment, protection of biological resources and of national treasures possessing artistic, historic or archaeological value, safety of installations and of workers, planned management of hydrocarbon resources (for example the rate at which hydrocarbons are depleted or the optimization of their recovery) or the need to secure tax revenues, impose conditions and requirements on the exercise of the activities set out in Article 2 (1)."

== Criticism ==
The Hydrocarbons Directive continues to foresee new extraction of fossil fuels, and does not yet contain any reference to the international law obligation to end fossil fuels in order to protect the right to life under the European Convention on Human Rights article 2, and comply with the maximum heating of the globe at 2 degrees under the Paris Agreement 2015.

== See also ==
- EU law
- UK enterprise law
