= European Group on Tort Law =

Academic group for tort revision common to Europe

The European Group on Tort Law, sometimes called the Spier/Koziol group, is an academic group devoted to revising tort principles that are supposed to be common to Europe.

In 1992 Jaap Spier, who at the time was a professor of law at the Universiteit van Tilburg, called together a group of scholars to discuss fundamental questions of tort law on a comparative basis. After exploring the limits of liability, this “Tilburg Group” embarked on quite a demanding project – the drafting of "Principles of European Tort Law” (PETL).

The group, now known under the name “European Group on Tort Law”, has grown considerably in the meantime and currently comprises twenty members. These include Francesco D. Busnelli, Giovanni Comandé (both Pisa, Italy), Herman Cousy (Leuven, Belgium), Dan Dobbs (Arizona, USA), Bill Dufwa (Stockholm, Sweden), Michael Faure (Maastricht, the Netherlands), Israel Gilead (Jerusalem, Israel), Michael Green (Wake Forest, USA), Konstantinos D. Kerameus (Athens, Greece), Bernhard A. Koch (Innsbruck, Austria), Helmut Koziol (Vienna, Austria), Ulrich Magnus (Hamburg, Germany), Miquel Martín-Casals (Girona, Spain), Jorge F. Sinde Monteiro (Coimbra, Portugal), Olivier Moréteau (Baton Rouge, USA), Johann Neethling (Pretoria, South Africa), W.V. Horton Rogers (Leeds, UK), Jaap Spier (the Hague, the Netherlands), Luboš Tichý (Prague, Czech Republic), Pierre Widmer (Berne, Switzerland).

In order to create an institutional basis for the drafting of the Principles, the European Centre of Tort and Insurance Law (ECTIL) was founded by the group in Vienna (Austria) at the beginning of 1999. ECTIL also undertakes further research projects in the field of tort and insurance law and is now supported by the Institute for European Tort Law of the Austrian Academy of Sciences.

In 2009, the Group has resumed work on the Principles with an eye to expanding the scope of supporting projects and to incorporating all the feedback collected so far. New members include Bjarte Askeland (Bergen, Norway), Ewa Baginska (Torun, Poland), Eugenia Dacoronia (Athens, Greece), Anne Keirse (Utrecht, the Netherlands), Ken Oliphant (Vienna, Austria), Vibe Ulfbeck (Copenhagen, Denmark) and Bénédict Winiger (Geneva, Switzerland).

== Bibliography ==
- J. Spier (ed.), The Limits of Liability: Keeping the Floodgates Shut (1996), ISBN 90-411-0169-1
- J. Spier (ed.), The Limits of Expanding Liability: Eight Fundamental Cases in a Comparative Perspective (1998), ISBN 90-411-0581-6
- H. Koziol (ed.), Unification of Tort Law: Wrongfulness (1998), ISBN 90-411-1019-4
- J. Spier (ed.), Unification of Tort Law: Causation (2000), ISBN 90-411-1325-8
- U. Magnus (ed.), Unification of Tort Law: Damages (2001), ISBN 90-411-1481-5
- B.A. Koch/H. Koziol (eds.), Unification of Tort Law: Strict Liability (2002), ISBN 90-411-1705-9
- J. Spier (ed.), Unification of Tort Law: Liability for Damage Caused by Others (2003), ISBN 90-411-2185-4
- U. Magnus/M. Martín-Casals (eds.), Unification of Tort Law: Contributory Negligence (2004), ISBN 90-411-2220-6
- W.V.H. Rogers (ed.), Unification of Tort Law: Multiple Tortfeasors (2004), ISBN 90-411-2319-9
- P. Widmer (ed.), Unification of Tort Law: Fault (2005), ISBN 90-411-2098-X
- European Group on Tort Law, Principles of European Tort Law (2005), ISBN 3-211-23084-X
