= Commission on European Family Law =

The Commission on European Family Law (as known as CEFL) was established on September 1, 2001. Its main objective is working for the harmonization of family law throughout Europe. The CEFL consists of experts in the field of family and comparative law from most European Union member states, as well as several other European countries.

== Principles ==
One accomplishment of the commission was the creation of a set of common principles in the area of family law based upon research of national legislation of European states.
