= Law of obligations =

Branch of private law

In civil law systems, the law of obligations is a branch of private law that relates to personal rights between parties.

== In Roman law ==
=== History ===
The word originally derives from the Latin "obligare" which comes from the root "lig", which suggests being bound, as one is to God for instance in "re-ligio".

Obligations did not originally form part of Roman law, which mostly concerned issues of succession, property, and family relationships. It developed as a solution to a gap in the system, when one party committed a wrong against another party. The state supported this solution by standardizing amounts for certain wrongs, giving rise to the law of obligations, as originating in delict. However, liability in this form did not yet include the idea that the wrongdoer owed monetary compensation to the innocent party. Compensation for a delict was merely conceived as an alternative to criminal punishment, and where compensation could not be paid, the wrongdoer would be harshly punished instead.

=== Institutes ===
Justinian first defines an obligation (obligatio) in his Institutes, Book 3, section 13 as "a legal bond, with which we are bound by necessity of performing some act according to the laws of our State." He further separates the law of obligations into contracts (ex contractu), delicts (ex delicto or ex maleficio), and those not classifiable as contractual or delictual (ex variis causarum figuris), namely quasi-contracts (quasi ex contractu) and quasi-delicts (quasi ex delicto or quasi ex maleficio).

The Roman law provided for a number of actions to enforce one's rights, including the condictio indebiti. Roman law did not have a concept of a trust, instead having a number of distinct doctrines that fulfilled the role of trusts, including the fideicommissum and the negotiorum gestio.

== Contemporary ==
=== Contracts ===
A contract can be broadly defined as an agreement that is enforceable at law. Gaius classified contracts into four categories which are: contracts consensu, verbal contracts, contracts re, and contracts litteris. But this classification cannot cover all the contracts, such as pacts and innominate contracts; thus, it is no longer used. According to many modern legal scholars, the most important classification of contracts is that of contracts consensu, which only require the consent of wills to create obligations, and formal contracts, which have to be concluded in a specific form in order to be valid (for example, in many European countries a contract regulating the purchase of real estate must be concluded in a special written form that is validated by a public notary).

=== Quasi-contracts ===
Quasi-contracts are supposed to be sources of obligations very similar to contracts, but the main difference is that they are not created by an agreement of wills. The main cases are negotiorum gestio (conducting of another person's affairs without their authorization), unjust enrichment, and solutio indebiti. This Roman classification is quite controversial for today's standards, since many of these cases would be considered as completely different from contracts (most notably unjust enrichment), and would instead be classified as delicts or special sources of obligations. They are formed by implication from circumstances regardless of the assent or dissent of parties. They are called quasi-contracts. The following are the examples of quasi-contractual obligations under the Roman law;

=== Quasi-delicts ===
The designation comprised a group of actions that are very similar to delicts, but lacking one of key elements of delicts. It includes res suspensae, responsibility for things poured or thrown out of buildings, responsibility of shippers/innkeepers/stablekeepers, and erring judges. For example, the responsibility of innkeepers creates obligations when certain things left by guests in the lodging are destroyed, damaged or lost by the innkeeper's assistants or employees. In this case, the innkeeper is responsible for the damages to the guest's property, even though he did not cause them personally.

== Comparative law ==
Whereas modern civil law jurisdictions typically trace their origins to Roman law, common law systems developed private law largely natively. Civil law jurisdictions conceive of an obligation as a legal bond (vinculum iuris) between an obligor and the obligee, where the obligor is bound to perform or refrain from performing some subject matter (prestation). The civilian obligation involves both the duty to tender performance (debitum) and the obligee's enforceable right to receive it (ius crediti). This differs from common law conceptions of obligations, which typically focus on the duties of the obligor and the remedies in event of failure to perform such duty.

In common law systems, the law of obligations is typically divided into contract, tort, unjust enrichment, and equitable remedies.

== Monetary obligations ==
In case of a monetary obligation (an obligation to pay a fixed amount of money) the nominalistic principle is applied worldwide: a unit of currency is always equal to itself, a pound is equal to a pound, a dollar is always equal to a dollar, etc., and inflation and the rate of exchange in relation to other currencies are not taken into account. However, this was not always so: up to the sixteenth century a debt had to be repaid in the same coins having the same quality in which it was contracted.

== See also ==
- Right
- Solidary obligations
- Swiss Code of Obligations
