= Literal contracts in Roman law =

Literal contracts (contractus litteris) formed part of the Roman law of contracts. Of uncertain origin, in terms of time and any historical development, they are often seen as subsidiary in Roman law to other forms. They had developed by at the latest 100 BC, and continued into the Late Roman Empire.

The form itself was a written entry in some form of account book, which Gaius describes as either replacing an existing obligation from another source, or transferring a debt from one person to another. At least the second form was unavailable to peregrines. It seems to have been limited to certain sums which were unconditional and which had the consent of the debtor. Its later development was shaped by changes in the oral contract, the stipulatio.

== Origin ==
The origin of the literal contract is uncertain. It is only towards the end of the second century BC that the evidence is suitably lucid for its existence. The ability to discern a distinction between financial accounts in general and a literal contract plagues early sources. Many, for example, describe the recording of receipts rather than disbursements. Gaius, writing later, considers the disbursement the central element, and so this throws doubt on the efficacy of the earlier sources to establish the presence of a literal contract. Dragomir Stojčević notes the presence of the terms "af" and "abs" in the early texts of Velius Longus, drawing on the later works of Cicero to demonstrate that they were only used in conjunction with literal accounts. However, the distinction between general accounts and a literal contract cannot be shown to any certainty, and the texts are still concerned only with the recording of receipts. Cicero's account of a knight called C. Canius, known to have been active in 115 BC, does at least provide significant (and accepted) evidence of them literal contract's existence at this time.

Alan Watson identifies the main areas of uncertainty, which, if showed one way or the other, would elucidate the dating problem. Of Gaius' two forms, which was the original form would also give an indication of the historical development. If the a re in personam form came first, then it must surely have come after the creation of bonae fidei contract forms, since the transfer of a stipulatio of mutuum form into a literal contract would have otherwise given no real benefit. It might have done if the literal contract was used to consolidate several different debts between two parties, to simplify them into a single action, but none of the texts point to this: they refer to a singular preceding obligation. If the a personam in personam form came first, then the development could have come much earlier. The consent of the debtor was probably required: this is stated as fact by some modern lawyers, although Watson points to the alternative explanation of Stojčević. Under the normal explanation, the tablets of Herculaneum show that something other than the written contract itself was required, necessarily debtor's consent. Exactly how the record shows the debtor's consent is uncertain, however.

== Form ==
The details of literal contracts are taken from a brief account in Gaius' Institutes, a considerably different account by Theophilus, brief references in other legal texts and mere allusions in texts by non-legal authors. How exactly an early literal contract differed from mutuum itself is not certain. The literal contract was formal: any claim would be based on the written form and not any facts which had led to its creation.

The literal contract was, according to Gaius, a nomina transcripta, and capable of functioning in two ways. The first is a re in personam ("from thing to person"), and transformed a debt resulting from another contractual arrangement (sale, hire, for example). A fictitious loan would then be constructed from the creditor to the debtor, thereby charging the debtor with fulfilling that obligation whilst discharging the other. The alternative was in transferring a debt from person to another: a personam in personam. The debt would be entered under the name of the person to whom it was being transferred. Gaius' account indicates that it was a previous obligation was required in the classical law, and Watson believes this can be conclusively shown for the last century of the Republic. However, it is possible that that was not the case originally. Appert has argued that the literal contract was created as an enforcement method for consensual contracts, before they became actionable in their own right.

It must always for a certain, set monetary sum. It is recording as having always to be unconditional, although Cicero appears to mention a conditional case. It is possible that the parties waited for the eventuality to occur before making a record of the literal contract at all. As mentioned above, it seems that the debtor was required to consent. Whilst a debtor would be expected to make an entry in his own accounts, this does not seem to have affected the validity of the literal contract. It was stricti iuris, and enforceable under the actio certae pecuniae creditae. The respondent could claim under the exceptio non numeratae pecuniae that the loan had never been made. However, this would normally be true, for the loan was normally a fictitious construct. Accordingly, the exception probably related to the non-existence of the prior agreement or debt.

The accepted approach in terms of physical form is an entry into the household's codex accepti and depensi – which would have to be balanced with a second fictitious entry. In the case of the a rem form, it would be a receipt of the amount owed on the account of the previous transaction; a personam, it would be an entry showing the receipt from the debtor from whom the debt was being transferred. If the literal contract was indeed limited to entries in tabulae ("account books"), then it must necessarily post-date their existence (and some measure of use), thus pointing to a later date than might be supposed if the literal contract extended to other forms of written words. The latter is favoured by Stojčević.

The Proculian school believed that neither form could be conducted by peregrines, the Sabinians that they could use the a re form, but not the a personam could. The situation before the classical age is unclear, as is the basis for making such a distinction. It is possible that like the spondeo form of verbal contract, it was derived mostly from tradition: that is considered entirely peculiar to Romans. This would suggest that it was much older. The alternative is that the completion of orderly account books were assumed to be restricted to Romans, and not something that a peregrine would or could do.

== Later law ==
The literal contract disappeared late into the classical age, sustained by its use in the banking trade. In Justinian's law, it had been replaced by the written form of the stipulatio, and by a form of conclusive evidence for another sort of loan (mutuum or commodatum) where the holder lost his exceptio that the loan had not taken place after a period of time. Authors such as W. W. Buckland and Barry Nicholas believe Justinian's claim that this was a new form of literal contracts to be badly mistaken, the latter suggesting it was created mainly to bring the number of types up to four, the preferred number of divisions. Accordingly, no mention is made in the Digest to the original form. Gaius refers to two types of document: the chirograph, made by a debtor only, and a syngraph made by both parties. He identifies them with the peregrine's law only; after the extension of citizenship to the majority of the free peoples of the Empire by Caracalla, they continued to be used, but only in an evidentiary role.
