= The Humber Ferryman's case =

English legal case

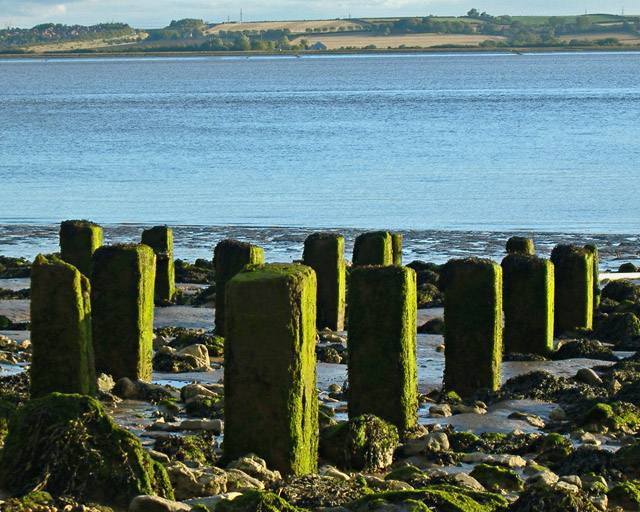
- The Humber estuary
- Court: Court of King's Bench

Keywords
- Contract, remedies

Bukton v Tounesende or The Humber Ferryman's case (1348) B&M 358 is an English contract law case.

== Facts ==
Nicholas Tounesende of Helle undertook to ferry John Bukton's horse across the Humber estuary. Tounesende overloaded the boat with horses and Bukton’s horse fell overboard. Bukton sued in tort, for trespass. There was no sealed document, and under previous law it had been required to sue for breach of a covenant. So Tounesende argued that the action should be brought in covenant. The King's Bench had travelled away from Westminster and had arrived in York.

== Judgment ==
The King's Bench held the action could rightly be brought in tort. The claim was against the killing of the horse, and not merely the failure to transport it. Accordingly no documentary proof of a covenant was needed.

== See also ==
- English contract law
