= Maximum harmonisation =

Term used in EU law

Maximum harmonisation is a term used in EU law.

If a piece of law (usually a directive but occasionally also a regulation) is described as maximum harmonisation, national law may not exceed the terms of the legislation. In practice, that prohibits gold-plating of EU legislation when it is transposed into national law.

It may also result in the repeal or amendment of existing national law, such as the effect of the Unfair Commercial Practices Directive on the British Trade Descriptions Act 1968.

Traditionally it was fairly uncommon for European legislation to be drafted on such a basis. However, deregulation has risen in the political agenda in the EU, as have concerns that member states occasionally use the national implementation of EU law as an opportunity to indulge in backdoor protectionism.

It is quite common for a directive or recommendation to consist of a mixture of maximum harmonisation and minimum harmonisation clauses.
