= Laesio enormis =

Legal doctrine

Laesio enormis (Latin: abnormal harm) is a legal doctrine that gives a contracting party the ability to rescind an agreement if the price of exchange is less than a certain proportion (for instance one half, or two thirds) of its actual value. The principle was developed as a way to ensure that people received a just price (iustum pretium) in exchange, and in opposition to the Imperial Roman view, found in the Corpus Juris Civilis, that the parties to an exchange were entitled to try to outwit one another.

== History ==
=== Early modern period ===
In their discussions relative on the respect of commutative justice in contractual relations, the members of the School of Salamanca cogitated a lot about laesio following Juan de Medina, Martín de Azpilcueta, Diego de Covarruvias y Leyva or Arias Piñel's example. They preserved it as a way to void a contract, but they didn't considered it as a vice of consent.

== Modern law ==
The Louisiana Civil Code article 2589 permits rescission for lesion beyond moiety (Fr: lésion outre moitié; Lat: laesio ultra dimidium). It states that the seller may rescind the sale of an immovable when the price, or the property it is exchanged for, is less than one half of the fair market value. Special rules apply to exchanges that have one party exchanging immovable property for a mixture of immovable or movable property, and cash—the party exchanging the mixture of property has the right to rescind the exchange, not the party exchanging the immovable.

The Austrian Civil Code §934 also allows the lesioned party (laedus) to rescind for lesion beyond moiety (Germ: Verkürzung über die Hälfte; Lat: laesio ultra dimidium) if the lesioned party receives less than half of the fair value of the consideration. The other party (laedens) may avert rescission by agreeing to pay the difference to full value. Lesion beyond moiety has been criticized from a legal and economics perspective for its inefficient incentives. In many cases it is impossible to profit from gathering information because profits above the mentioned threshold are prohibited by the law.

== See also ==
- Consideration - a related concept in common law systems
- Unconscionability
- Intrinsic fraud
