= Real contracts in Roman law =

In Roman law, contracts could be divided between those in re, those that were consensual, and those that were innominate contracts in Roman law (Contratti innominati (diritto romano)). Although Gaius only identifies a single type of contract in re, it is commonly thought that there were four types of these, as Justinian identifies: mutuum (loan for consumption), commodatum (loan for use), depositum (deposit) and pignus (pledge).

Each varied regarding the expected standards of care, transfer of ownership, and other practicalities stemming from the purpose of each. They all involved the delivery of a physical thing, which was a defining characteristic of such contracts. They were generally supplemented by the stipulatio and an inominate contract, which allowed additional provisions, such as interest, to be added to contracts in re making them more suitable for commercial applications.

== General features ==
Justinian identifies four types of real contract – contracts in re (in a thing) – mutuum, commodatum, depositum and pignus. Common to all four was an agreement, and the delivery of a res corporalis. They are in contrast to consensual and inominate contracts. Real contracts were of limited significance, although they are featured prominently in the works of jurists. If a stipulatio had to be created to cover any interest, then it could be used to cover the other elements of the transaction as well.

Gaius, however, only mentions one type of contract in re: mutuum. The others certainly existed in Gaius' time. The other three can be distinguished insofar as they are different from traditional concepts of debt from which real contracts developed, are bilateral, do not transfer ownership, are bona fide and praetorian in nature. Gaius can therefore be seen as writing at a developing time in the law, although why the others are not mentioned at all in the Institutes of Gaius is not known.

== Mutuum ==
A mutuum was a loan for consumption. It was the oldest contract in re, growing in importance after 326 BC when the lex Poetalia was passed. It could be used by people without the right of commercium – a package of rights to participate in the ius civile and to undertake remedies. It involved the delivery of certain types of fungible goods, such as money, food, and drink. Ownership was transferred, as was possession. In a strict sense then, because ownership passed, it should not be considered a loan. The mutuum obliged the borrower not to return the thing itself, because its use would involve consumption, but a similar thing in quantity, quality and size.

The lender had a condictio action for the value of the thing if a similar thing was not returned as described. It was stricti iuris ("strict law") – the lender could not claim interest. Despite this, it became the standard arrangement for moneylenders in the Roman Republic. Interest would instead have to be given in a stipulatio, an additional contract. Rates of interest were heavily regulated by the state. As a mutuum did not place on the borrower any specific date on which to return the equivalent thing, this would also be given in a stipulatio if required. In the later law, the stipulatio replaced mutuum completely.

The borrower was bound to return the equivalent thing. As owner, he bore liability for loss, theft, or damage; they were irrelevant to his liability for the thing. Two exceptions were made, where repayment would be dependent on the success of the operation: the financing of a cargo ship, and the sponsorship of a professional athlete. Neither was liable if they did not succeed; the risk was born by the lender. Mutuum was unilateral and did not place the lender under any obligations or duties.

== Commodatum ==
A commodatum was a loan for use. It did not transfer ownership nor possession, and was also gratuitous (no interest could be charged). If interest was included, the agreement was instead either one of hire or an innominate contract. It was assumed to be for a "reasonable time" if this was not specified at the time of the agreement. Land could be the subject of a commodatum during the Classical period and later, though this was doubted before that. Perishables could not be loaned for use, unless they were to be used for display purposes only, or a small number of other exceptions. The lender under a commodatum did not have to be owner, since ownership was not transferred.

A borrower was held (in most juristic texts) to a standard of culpa levis in abstracto – the borrower was liable if his or her conduct fell short of the diligentia (care) of a bonus paterfamilias – a good, respected, head of the family. Some commentators consider the relevant standard to have instead been that of a diligentissimus paterfamilias ("most careful head-of-family"), a higher standard. This may have developed from an earlier standard of custodia. Custodia was a form of strict liability, where the only situation when the borrower would not be liable would be actions of a "greater force" (vis maior) such a theft with force, or what is called in the modern English law an act of God. If the borrower was liable, then he had an action available against the thief (the actio furti) or damager under the Lex Aquilia. Where the borrower was liable, Justinian at least gave the lender the choice of whether to sue the borrower in personam in breach of contract, or the thief or damager. The borrower was also liable for furtum if he misused the thing he had borrowed. If the borrowed thing had undisclosed defects which caused damage of which the lender was aware, then the lender would be liable under delict. The appropriate action for breach of contract was the actio commodati. If the lender owed the borrower money relating to another contract or sale, then he could keep the borrowed thing and offset the cost against the debt He could also bring the actio commodati contraria if his expenses exceeded the value of the property borrowed.

== Depositum ==
A depositum was a deposit for safekeeping. It did not transfer ownership nor possession, and was also gratuitous. Land could not be the subject of a deposit. If interest was included, then the deposit became a contract of hire. Since ownership did not pass, a thief could deposit. The depositee could not benefit from the deposit in any way. If the depositee used the thing, then this was considered theft by furtum usus.

It appears that the depositee was held to culpa lata standard. This meant that the depositee was liable if found to have been grossly negligent: careless to the extent that bad faith could almost be assumed. Culpa lata was therefore similar to dolus ("fraud"). Indeed, some commentators consider dolus to be the appropriate standard. The parties could agree to vary the level of care expected of the depositee. A depositee was expected to return the thing on demand. Reasonable "wear and tear" was acceptable. The depositee was also bound to hand over any accretions of the thing, such as any young born to a deposited animal. The depositor was liable for any damage caused by the deposited thing, and the cost of transportation if the place that the things was to be returned differed from that where it was borrowed. The actio depositi was available to the depositor to seek return of his goods, with double damages awarded if the damage had been made in an emergency, such as during fire or riot. It resulted in infamia if the depositee was held liable. The depositee had the actio depositi contraria if expenses were paid. Originally, it seems that the expenses could be set against the value of the thing in the actio depositi, but, if so, this ability came to an end in the time of Justinian.

There were two special types of deposit. The first was the depositum irregulare of fungibles, normally money. In contrast to a usual deposit, ownership did pass, granting more rights to the depositee to protect the property. It had to be returned on request, and the transferee could derive no benefit from it. The second was sequestrio, whereby a thing whose ownership was disputed was deposited with a third party, bound to return it to the successful party in a vindicatio or similar action. Because possession passed, both parties were prevented from usucapting until the disagreement was settled. It could be used in relation to land or movables.

== Pignus ==
A pignus ("pledge") was a form of real security which transferred possession but not ownership. It often formed part of a mortgage or similar transaction.

It developed later than the similar fiducia, where ownership was transferred as well as possession. Accordingly, the thing could be sold by the owner and deducted from the debt without recourse to the pledgor, and whilst it was owned by pledgee the pledgor had no right of use. It also required a formal conveyance. This is in contrast to the pignus, which could be carried out by traditio. Fiducia remained popular with lenders who enjoyed increased security, whereas a pignus was more useful to the pledger. Fiducia lasted until the late Roman Empire, but was increasingly eclipsed by pignus.

The pledgee, if he was in physical control of the object (as was usually the case) was required to safeguard the thing. Like the borrower, a pledgee was held to the culpa levis in abstracto standard; again, this may have developed from custodia. The pledgor was liable for damage done by his thing deposited, if he acted without the care of a bonus paterfamilias. If the pledgee fell short of the expected standard, the contract was terminated immediately. The pledgee could claim for expenses incurred in maintaining the thing (such as an animal or slave). The pledgee had to set any profits derived from the thing against the outstanding debt. The pledge was repaid when the debt was settled, along with any accretions. The pledgor had no action without repayment. The pledgee did not have ownership, and therefore could not sell or destroy the thing, which was restrictive. A right of sale was typically agreed between the parties, to come into effect after a set time. So common was this that it was often considered implied. The amount would be deducted from the debt, interest and expenses added, and this could then be sued for under whichever contract had formed the debt.
