= German contract law =

German contract law is rooted in the German Civil Code (Bürgerliches Gesetzbuch), which went into effect on 1 January 1900. Reforms of the law since then have included the 2001 Act to Modernise the Law of Obligations.

Major works in English examining the German law of obligations include The Law of Torts by European legal scholar Basil Markesinis.

== See also ==
- Abstraktionsprinzip
- Bank guarantee case
- Drittwirkung
