= Transposition (law) =

Practice of implementing EU rules via national measures

In law, transposition is a process by which an international agreement is adopted into national law, taking account of national conventions and any related or prior legislation.

== European Union ==
In European Union law, transposition refers specifically a process by which the European Union's member states give force to a directive by passing appropriate implementation measures. Transposition is typically done by either primary legislation or secondary legislation.

The European Commission closely monitors that transposition is timely, correctly done and implemented, so as to attain the results intended. Incorrect transposition may be the result of non acting (leaving aside certain provisions), diverging (other scope, definition or requirement), "gold-plating" (exceeding the requirements of the directive), "double-banking" (overlapping between existing national laws and the transposed directive), or "regulatory creep" (overzealous enforcement or a state of uncertainty in the status of the regulation).

The European Commission may bring a case in the European Court of Justice against states which have not transposed directives adequately. Additionally, any individual or business in a Member State may lodge a complaint with the Commission about the incorrect or delayed transposition of an EU directive or "for any measure (law, regulation or administrative action) or practice attributable to a Member State which they consider incompatible with a provision or a principle of EU law".

The Commission publishes an annual report summarising how EU law has been transposed, with statistics on the numbers and types of infringements, per country and sector.
