= European contract law =

European contract law represents a strategy working towards a common set of legal principles operating in the field of contract law across the European Union, with minimal differentiation between the national contract laws which apply within the member states. Contract law represents one of the areas of private law harmonisation being pursued and progressed by the European Commission, while the Principles of European Contract Law are a set of model rules drawn up by leading contract law academics in Europe, which attempt to elucidate the basic rules of contract law, and more generally the law of obligations, which most legal systems of the member states of the European Union hold in common. The Principles of European Contract Law (PECL) are based on the concept of a uniform European contract law system and were created by the self-styled Commission on European Contract Law set up by the late Ole Lando ("Lando Commission"). The PECL take into account the requirements of the European domestic trade.

== History ==
In a broad sense the principles offer a "set of general rules ... designed to provide maximum flexibility and thus accommodate future development in legal thinking in the field of contract law". The impetus for the work on the PECL were resolutions of the European Parliament of 26 May 1989 "on action to bring into line the private law of the Member States", and 25 July 1994, which expressed the desire to establish a common European civil law. As an initial foundation, a common contract law was to be first created.

Probably the first response was Harvey McGregor's 1993 "Contract Code", which was produced in response to a request from the English and Scots Law Commissions for proposals for the possible codification of a combined law of contract for England and Scotland. McGregor made this work available to the EU, who seemingly ignored it.

Instead, the Commission on European Contract Law (an organisation independent of any national obligations) started work in 1982 under the chairmanship of the late Ole Lando, a lawyer and professor from Denmark who died in April 2019. The Commission consisted of 22 members from all member states of the European Union and was partly financed by the EU. The first part of the PECL was published in 1995; the second part has been available since 1999, and the third part was completed in 2002.

A symposium on "a European Civil Code" took place at The Hague in 1997, organised by the Dutch Ministry of Justice during the January–June 1997 Dutch presidency of the European Council.

The European Commission published a "communication" concerning "a more coherent European Contract Law" on 15 March 2003. The Commission's Action Plan set out within this communication proposed adopting "a mixture of regulatory and non-regulatory measures" to address the problems resulting from national diversity within the contract law field. The Commission and the legal experts in this field have pointed out the extensive research which needs to be undertaken (and financed) to take this agenda forward. Schulze and Ebers, in a "joint response", see the agenda as having three stages:

- "taking stock" of existing primary law
- identifying areas of similarity between legal acts and the "sectors" in which community law has been developed, and
- investigating to what extent there are already common principles which can be "restated" as community law.

Today, the work of the Commission on European Contract Law is continued by the Study Group on a European Civil Code. The Group is managed by Christian von Bar, a German law professor. The Group was founded in 2005.

== Principles of European Contract Law ==
The Principles of European Contract Law (PECL) were inspired by the United Nations Convention on Contracts for the International Sale of Goods (CISG) from 1980; however, they are a so-called soft law. Therefore, the PECL do not represent a legally enforceable regulation: "The term 'soft law' is a blanket term for all sorts of rules which are not enforced on behalf of the state, but are seen, for example, as goals to be achieved."

Thus, the PECL are very similar to the Principles of International Commercial Contracts of UNIDROIT – International Institute for the Unification of Private Law (Unidroit Principles) which were already published in 1994. As is the case with the PECL, the Unidroit Principles are a "private codification" prepared by top-class jurists without any national or supranational order or authorisation. Their main goal of both the PECL and the Unidroit Principles was the compilation of uniform legal principles for reference, and, if necessary, the development of national legal systems.

In the compilation of the PECL, the law of the EU member states, and thus common and civil law, as well as non-European law were taken into consideration. In the PECL regulations are available which in this form have not been included so far in any legal system. The authors of the PECL also pursued the long-term goal of influencing the development of laws in Europe.

=== The PECL as common core of the European systems ===
In the formulation of the PECL the Lando Commission also used various European legal systems. In comparing these legal systems, there are often considerable differences with regard to certain regulations.

To make available to the concerned parties a fair legal construct for their business dealings that do not prefer a party from a particular jurisdiction, the differing national law in question was, more or less, merged to form a common core.

This approach is intended to eliminate insecurity in international transactions. Each party can be assured not to have disadvantages due to unfavorable aspects of particular national law after the parties have agreed to the application of the Principles: "... the only way to a really unified market was and is that of having a common set of rules in order to overcome the traditional barriers of each national legal order having a distinct and disparate regulation on the subject."

The disadvantageous effects of differing national laws on the behaviour of the market participants will thus be avoided, trade will be promoted, as will a legally uniform European market.

In this manner, the PECL succeed in bridging the gap between the civil law of the European continent and the common law of the Anglo-American system by offering regulations which were created to reconcile the divergent views of two systems.

At the same time, the PECL provide assistance to judges in national courts and arbitrators in arbitration proceedings deciding cross-border issues. Should there not result any satisfactory solution from the national laws, "the Court [...] may adopt the solution provided by the Principles knowing that it represents the common core of the European systems."

Written in a language known to all parties and using a uniform terminology, the PECL also serve as a "basis for any future European Code of Contracts", consistent with the above-mentioned EU resolutions, which may eventually replace separate national laws.

=== The PECL as part of a European Lex Mercatoria ===
Often, parties to international sales contracts do not agree on a national law governing their contractual agreement. Instead, they sometimes agree on the validity of internationally approved legal principles, the so-called "general principles of law".

These law principles, the Lex mercatoria, on which a court can then make its decision to settle the disputes of the parties, are composed of the "laws of several systems, the work of the legal writers and the published arbitral awards", and thus the entirety of the international legal practices in a special field of law. Thus, the PECL are, like the Unidroit Principles or the CISG, also part of the Lex Mercatoria.

Whether Lex Mercatoria is subject to choice of law by the parties, is, however, actively disputed in international private law. This is also true for its legal nature per se. The PECL do not play a significant role in drafting of international sales contracts, or as a law governing such contracts. The possibility of including the PECL in such contracts – either expressly or by reference to "general trade principles" or similar – is indeed expressly mentioned in the PECL.

In practice, however, the PECL are rarely agreed upon as applicable law. Within the trade between the member states of the European Union, the PECL nevertheless have a certain influence, since they were precisely created for such trade. The PECL enable the court, should it make use of them, to reach a balanced decision. Further, it is possible that national legislative bodies will consult the PECL in connection with possible reforms to obtain a view of the current European consensus on contract law, without having to analyse the law of the individual states in detail.

=== Influence on development of law and national legal systems ===
The PECL were created, as was the case with the CISG and the Unidroit Principles, with the intention to be an example for existing and future national legal systems.

Regulations under these soft laws were integrated in the new laws of various Central European and East European states. For example, parts of regulations of the PECL became part of the German Civil Code (BGB) in the course of the reform of the law of obligations in 2002.

=== Influence on a European civil code ===
There is an ongoing legal dispute as to whether an independent European civil code beyond the existing substantial EU regulatory framework is needed. If it is determined that a European civil code is needed, the PECL provides important steps toward the establishment of such a code.

The Study Group on a European Civil Code (SGECC), based on the PECL and, respectively, the Lando-Commission, presented in 2009 a draft Common Frame of Reference (DCFR) in co-operation with other institutions. It is a draft for the codification of the whole European contract law and related fields of law.

Amongst its efforts regarding a coherent European legal framework, the European Commission published a green paper on European contract law policy options in July 2010, where it put forward seven options for the further handling with the prepared Draft Common Frame of Reference up for discussion. These options range from the fully non-binding presentation of the results as a "toolbox" and a "facultative European contract law instrument" up to an EU Directive or Regulation establishing a binding European civil code. Although the European Commission affirms that the options would be put up for an open-ended discussion, it is already preparing concrete regulations for an optional instrument by an "Expert Group" and a "Stakeholder Sounding Board".

Actually, the solution of an optional European contract law seems to be favoured (so-called 28th regime, alongside the 27 contract law systems of the member states) for which the users and companies within the European Union could use at their will (opt-in rule). This optional regulation would be offered as an alternative to the existing individual-state contract law systems of the member states in all official languages. It could optionally be used for transnational contracts only or also for domestic contractual relationships.

However, the concept of the prepared Draft Common Frame of Reference has met with strong criticism in the European member states. There are fears that a reliable application of law is not possible without a thorough revision of the draft. Further developments remain to be seen.

== See also ==
- Principles of European Tort Law
- Rome I Regulation
- Rome II Regulation
