= Stipulatio =

Form of contract in Ancient Roman law

Stipulatio was the basic form of contract in Roman law. It was made in the format of question and answer.

== Capacity ==
In order for a contract to be valid, parties must have capacity: both intellectus ("understanding") and voluntas ("wish", "will"). Lunatics and infants lacked intellectus, and could not fully understand a legally-binding contract, or understand it, and therefore could not legally agree to one. Slaves lacked voluntas and therefore could not contract. Although slaves could not be bound by a contract, they could contract to benefit their master, even without his permission, (because he would then be able to choose whether or not to enforce it) or with his consent, might burden him, because he would provide the necessary voluntas. Wards and women could stipulate under their tutor's authority, and this was not needed if they benefited under the stipulation.

== Intention to be bound ==
The orthodox argument is that intention was not an essential condition of Roman contract law, but an integral Byzantium interpolation. However, David Ibbetson, a British legal academic specializing in Roman law, has argued that the intention of a contracting party was necessary. D.50.27.48 argues that, in the context of divorce, what was said in anger would not bind unless it was accompanied by action, e.g. a wife saying she will walk out and then doing so. A madman could not stipulate because he lacked understanding. These texts combined suggest that some form of intention to be bound was required.

== Agreement ==
Agreement was essential to a valid contract under Roman law. Without a meeting of the minds, the contract was void. The result of this was that animus was needed from both parties, both in order to accept the burden and in order to accept the benefit of the contract. The texts cover two situations where agreement fails.

Firstly, if someone stipulates for slave A and there are two slaves called A, which slave the stipulation is binding for depends on evidence extraneous to the verbal contract, for example, a hand is placed on the slave.

Secondly, where a document has been used as evidence of a contract, but the document is ambiguous (which is where agreement is most important) the texts discuss two possible responses. This ambiguity may be resolved against the stipulator (the approach taken by Celsus and Ulpian), or the mistake may make the contract void (the approach taken by Venellius and Paul and followed in Justinian’s institutes).

== Orality ==
A Roman contract had to be oral. Since the contract was oral, it could not be made by the deaf or dumb without a slave to act as their mouth or ear piece and could not be made from afar. D.45.1.1.pr, which appears to have been compressed, since the reasoning does not follow perfectly, says that there can only be a stipulation when parties speak, so the mute, deaf and dumb cannot stipulate, and someone who is not present cannot stipulate. However, a slave may stipulate for a deaf or dumb master.

The Greeks, however, used purely written contracts, which clearly had some influence on Roman law, which did use writing. However, authors such as Zimmermann and Nicholas held that the oral contract remained crucial, and the documents merely supplemented the contract as evidence. In C.4.32.1 a question was sent to the emperor about a situation where a document witnesses a promise to pay back a loan but does not mention the requirement of interest, which was a part of the oral promise. The response is that the interest is still enforceable. This fits with D.50.17.92, which says a stipulation which is recorded wrongly is still valid. Also, D.2.14.7.12 is an example of a written stipulation, and it speaks in the past tense, that T had asked and M had promised, which again suggests that the written documents performed an evidential function. More often than not, by the Late Empire under Emperor Leo (which influenced his rescript), the oral stipulation was never in fact made; the documents recorded a non-event.

There is some dispute about whether or not the stipulatio degenerated and became a written contract. Barry Nicholas has argued that circa 140AD a written document became very strong evidence of an oral agreement, creating a presumption that an oral promise had been made, unless it could be proven that the parties had not met. By 201AD this is stated explicitly in the texts. This approach demonstrates an attempt by Roman lawyers to reconcile Greek contracts, which must be in writing with the Roman world, which required an oral exchange.

Diosidi has argued that the stipulatio degenerated further, so far that although theoretically an oral exchange is required, in practice this was not necessary. The first text he uses to support his argument is G.3.1.34 However, this text refers to chinographs and synographs, (not Roman terms) and a better interpretation of it might be that it simply describes the situation in Greece. He also refers to D.45.1.30, in which a written document purports to be a contract, however this is not incompatible with the arguments of Nicholas.

== Specific words ==
G.3.92 says that to create a verbal obligation pairs of words should be used, with a correspondence between question and answer. It then uses the Latin word spondeo, lists six examples, and then says that only Roman citizens could use the verb spondeo. C.8.37.10, a text from the time of Justinian I, says that stipulations shall be enforced whatever words they are couched in. It is clear that there was some degeneration of the stipulatio, however, since the extent to which the stipulatio degenerated depended on the view taken as to what the stipulatio originally required.

Nicholas has argued that veluti here means "that is to say" and that the stipulation began as a set list of words that could be used. There are examples in the texts of other words being used but he argues that most of these are interpolations. He accepts that some words may have been added to the list and argues that Justinian was attempting to revive classical law but at the same time, reconcile written and oral practice, so he interprets this text to mean that the list becomes an unbounded list at this point.

Other academics have contested this. Watson argues that since you can destroy a stipulation without formal words, you can probably create one in the same fashion. Winkler says that Gaius always uses veluti to mean "for example". Van Oven points to the fact that G.3.92 does not say that the words create a stipulation but that they create a verbal obligation. He has argued that given that there are another two types of verbal obligations not in the list, the list in inconclusive. Also, it seems strange that a limited list should contain such informal words as dari, meaning simply "to give". (Of the six examples of words given, the first four are very formal, but the others are very common). This seems, at first glance, to be undesirable, as parties would be bound far too easily. However, Ibbetson has pointed to the requirement of intention and said that this means that an unbounded list was not a problem. Taking this approach, Riccobono thus argues that C.8.37.10 means that there was no longer any need for question and answer.

D.45.1.2 suggests that the degeneration may have gone further still, requiring no correspondence between question and answer. This text says that if one party says “Will you give?” and the other says “why not?” he is bound, but if he merely nods, there is no civil or natural obligation. The example of a guarantor is then given. The text is clearly abbreviated, and it seems unlikely that the stipulation did ever degenerate this far, as if this was the case, we would expect the many references to agreement between question and answer to have been excised from the other texts.

== Languages ==
The texts are inconclusive as to which languages can be used. G.3.93 says that stipulation is valid in Greek, providing the other party understands it. They may have only mentioned Greek, and no other language, simply because this was the only other language Romans spoke.

D.45.1.16 says that if the question is in Latin and the reply is in Greek, the obligation is settled, providing the two correspond. This seems to suggest that there was not a closed list of words. Importantly, it then goes on to say that other languages can only produce an obligation, not an action. However, the examples given are all in dead languages – which may be significant. An obligation is only produced when both parties understand each other, but this understanding may be reached through an interpreter. The last clause suggests that the text may have been interpolated, as the use of an interpreter seems unlikely, as it would be highly problematic because the interpreter might lie as to what was being said.

== Conditions about the timing and interval ==
No gap between question and answer

D.45.1.137.pr considers whether or not there can be a gap between question and answer. It states that a moment may naturally intervene but otherwise it should be continuous, and “he” may not begin something else, even if the reply is given on the same day. The point of the text seems to be that the question and answer must be glued together, but there are a few uncertainties. The first part, referring to the intervention of a moment, may be an interpolation, however, it may be a careful qualification by a lawyer Who it is that may not begin something else is also unclear -- the Latin is ambiguous -- but it seems likely this text is referring to the actions of the promisor.

That the text expressly rebuts the idea that a reply may be given on the same day after a party has undertaken some other business, suggests that such things were valid at some point in Roman law, although it could be an interpolation. D.45.1.1.1 says that a person answering on the same day is bound but someone answering on the next day is not. An analogy may be drawn with a legal trial, where things had to take place in one day but they would divide the day, so it was technically the same day, even though not chronologically. The emphasis placed was on factual continuity and legal bondedness.

Superfluous words between question and answer

It seems that any superfluous things between question and answer may have been simply ignored; this is certainly the approach taken in D.45.1.65. However, the author of this text was Florentinus, which is interesting. There were two persons of this name, and one of them was a contemporary of Ulpian. Generally the Digest tends to quote Ulpian, so we would expect Ulpian to have been quoted. The other Florentinus came after Ulpian, which would suggest that, if Ulpian did not say so, this was only true in later law. However, this is uncertain as the thought may simply have seemed too obvious for Ulpian to have pointed it out.

== Correspondence of subject matter ==
If something was described differently between the question and answer, for example, if a pen was referred to as a writing instrument in the answer, the stipulation was still valid.

== Content of the contract ==
Conditional question and unconditional answers to conditional questions were invalid in Roman law.

Stipulation for when I die was considered valid and was taken to mean "I will perform when I am dying", i.e. performance is due in the last moments of life. However, a stipulation for the day before death was not valid.

Stipulation for after death was probably not permissible under classical law because the obligation would reside solely in a third party, the heir. However, Ulpian, when he states the rule that one party cannot promise for another, makes an exception for heirs, which may mean that it was permissible by that time. By the time of Justinian, the clear inconsistency between permitting a stipulation for "when I die" but not for "after death" or for "the day before death" was removed, as both had become valid.

Stipulation for 10, answer given is 20: According to G.3.102 this would be void. However, according to D.45.1.1.4 it would be valid for 10. If the stipulation was for slave a and slave b, for example, and the answer is slave a, the stipulation would be valid for slave a only. Ulpian argued there are as many stipulations as things stipulated for. This may seem unfair, but it is up to the promisee whether or not he enforces the promise.

Stipulation for a or b, where the answer given is a: This was void in the case of slaves but valid in the case of money The difference arose because money cannot be destroyed but slaves can, so a stipulation for slave a or b is fundamentally different from one for a because in the first instance, if a dies, the stipulation would be valid for b, whereas in the second, the contract would be void.

== Dies (day) ==
When an obligation was framed as arising based on a future event which was certain to happen, for example, "I will pay £10 on Wednesday", the obligation and the debt both arose from the moment of contract formation, which meant that an action could not be brought for the £10 before Wednesday, and if the £10 was paid before the end of Wednesday, a condictio could not be brought to reclaim it.

== Conditions ==
A condition existed when an obligation was framed as arising based on an event that might or might not happen. Although withdrawal from a conditional stipulation, once made, was not possible, no debt arose until the condition was satisfied. An exception to this arose if a party was preventing the condition from occurring, in which case it is treated as having already happened.

Conditions could be either resolutive or suspensive.

A resolutive condition removed an existing debt on the occurrence of an event. For example: "When X reaches the age of 25, he no longer has the right to live in Y". The uncertainty as to whether or not X will reach the age of 25 made this a conditio and not a dies as dies incertus pro conditio habetur.

A suspensive condition meant there was no duty to pay unless or until the event occurred. These conditions were very useful for creating a penalty clause and concentrating the mind on performance, because if the task was not completed, payment penalties were due. This also allowed the damages from the lack of performance to be determined in the stipulatio rather than left in the hands of the iudex and uncertainty because of evidence problems, unavailability of specific performance, and the discretionary and therefore undetermined nature of the damages. It also saved time to do it this way. Conditions could also be used to prevent appeal against the decision of an arbiter, by putting a penalty in place if the arbiter's decision was not complied with. It could also ensure payments to third parties, for example by making a condition that if a sum was not paid to T, it would have to be paid to the other party to the contract. This could not be achieved directly due to the rules relating to payment of third parties.

There were, however, a few types of conditions which were problematic:

Immoral conditions – These were void outright, e.g. promising money to a party for not marrying someone.

Impossible conditions e.g. a cow with no legs jumping, were void, and if found in a will, the impossible section would be struck out.

Conditions which are always fulfilled For example, if £10 was promised if S did not win the lottery, and S could never win the lottery because he was a slave, the money would always be due.

Risk bearing in contracts – If A promised £10 if B did not give £5 to S, and S dies, the risk fell on A. However, the contract could be redrafted as saying that £10 will be given if £5 is not given to S. If S then dies the risk falls on ????

Perplexing conditions e.g. in a will, that S was to become free and when he was free, he was to become heir. Romans normally saved them. In this case the Romans would have regarded the man as both free and bound at the same time.

Preposterous conditions might include obligations due before the obligee could know if the condition was true. J.3.9.14 says that preposterous conditions were once invalid, but Justinian changed the law. However, they do not seem to have been invalid at the time of Paul and Africanus. This may have been an interpolation, or lawyers may have reached this point by later classical law. However, contrasting the examples given in these two texts suggests that there may have been a fundamental difference between the two types of preposterous conditions. In J.3.9.14 the example given was promising to pay on Wednesday if the ship arrived on Friday. In D.45.1.126.pr the example was that the party would pay 10 per year beginning that day, if S becomes consul. In the second example, it could be that the obligation arose when S became consul, however, backdated payments would have to be paid from now to that time. 6.3.52 also speaks on this matter, but it argues that preposterous conditions are both invalid and valid, and appears to have been something like lecture notes, updated with the changes made by Justinian, but without removing the old text.

Furthermore, a suspensive potestative negative condition could be impossible to meet before the death of the person. For example, a promise of unless the other party remarried would raise issues, as the only time when the obligee could be certain that the obligor did not remarry was at his death, at which point the payment would be of no use. This issue was resolved by the application of the cautio Muciana which turned the suspensive, negative and potestative condition into a resolutive, affirmative and potestative condition.

== Remedies ==
Condictio was a claim for a certain thing. The condictio did not have to explain why something was owed, merely state that it was owed and specify an exact amount. Its original role in the system of legis actiones was that D would swear he had not gotten x. If he failed to swear it he would be liable and pay an extra penalty. Alternatively, D could challenge P to swear. If P swore successfully he would not be liable, but if he failed he was liable for this and a penalty. If he refused to swear, the claim would be disallowed. Beliefs about swearing held that the gods would prevent someone from telling an untruth under oath. However, there was little room for flexible interpretation of liability because no questions were asked when the oath was made. By the time of Ulpian there was a ''condictio certae creditae pecuniae'' for money and a condictio certae res to establish the value of a thing.

Actio ex stipulatu was a claim for an uncertain thing and would give unliquidated damages e.g. for failure to do something. The procedure was to quote the words of the stipulatio, and the iudex would determine the amount due. This meant that there was leeway in determining the amount of the damages, so it was not a problem that the stipulation was theoretically a stricti iuris. This was also easier, as the amount claimed did not have to be specified, and there was therefore no risk of asking for the wrong amount.

Others

- Promise to give: stipulatio dari
- Promise to do: actio ex stipulatu

== Defences ==
Fraud - In 67BC a defence was created of fraud, committed by either the promisor or promisee. Ulpian considers the views of Servius and of Labeo in D.4.3.1.2. Servius argued that the defence existed when one thing was pretended and another thing done, whilst Labeo focused on the wrongful intentions of the party – any cunning / trickery / contrivance to cheat / trick / deceive. Ulpian followed Labeo so dolus by the time of Ulpian meant any wrongful conduct in the making of the contract, or in standing on rights in the contract. This introduced bona fides into the stricti iuris contract. In consensual contracts, good faith was key as this would always be considered, however, since dolus was only a defence, it meant that good faith would only be considered if you added it as a point of consideration in the Praetor's formula of the case.

Duress - metus was introduced as a defence at a later stage. The exact meaning of duress is unclear from the texts, however, it seems that it needed to be severe and contrary to sound morals, enough affect a man of resolute character, and probably result in a fear of serious evil. The strict requirements were to be expected; otherwise a party might argue, for example, that they had been forced to enter into a loan contract because they were poor and therefore under economic duress. Dolus was included in metus, but since metus was enforceable against a third party whilst dolus was not, metus was a better defence.

== See also ==
- Contract law
- Literal contracts in Roman law
