= Good faith (law) =

Implied covenant of honesty and fair dealing in contract law

In contract law, the implied covenant of good faith and fair dealing is a general presumption that the parties to a contract will deal with each other honestly, fairly, and in good faith, so as to not destroy the right of the other party or parties to receive the benefits of the contract. It is implied in a number of contract types in order to reinforce the express covenants or promises of the contract.

A lawsuit (or a cause of action) based upon the breach of the covenant may arise when one party to the contract attempts to claim the benefit of a technical excuse for breaching the contract, or when he or she uses specific contractual terms in isolation in order to refuse to perform their contractual obligations, despite the general circumstances and understandings between the parties. When a court or trier of fact interprets a contract, there is always an "implied covenant of good faith and fair dealing" in every written agreement.

== Usage in the United States ==
=== Historical usage ===
In U.S. law, the legal concept of implied covenant of good faith and fair dealing arose in the mid-19th century because contemporary legal interpretations of "the express contract language, interpreted strictly, appeared to grant unbridled discretion to one of the parties". In 1933, in the case of Kirke La Shelle Company v. The Paul Armstrong Company et al. 263 N.Y. 79; 188 N.E. 163; 1933 N.Y., the New York Court of Appeals said:

In every contract there is an implied covenant that neither party shall do anything, which will have the effect of destroying or injuring the right of the other party, to receive the fruits of the contract. In other words, every contract has an implied covenant of good faith and fair dealing.

Furthermore, the covenant was discussed in the First Restatement of Contracts by the American Law Institute, but before adoption of the Uniform Commercial Code in the 1950s, the common law of most states did not recognize an implied covenant of good faith and fair dealing in contracts. Certain states, such as Massachusetts, have stricter enforcement than others. For example, the Commonwealth of Massachusetts will assess punitive damages under Chapter 93A which governs unfair and deceptive business practices, and a party found to have violated the covenant of good faith and fair dealing under 93A may be liable for punitive damages, legal fees and treble damages.

=== Contemporary usage ===
The implied covenant of good faith and fair dealing is especially important in U.S. law. It was incorporated into the Uniform Commercial Code (as part of Section 1–304), and was codified by the American Law Institute as Section 205 of the Restatement (Second) of Contracts.

Most U.S. jurisdictions view the breach of the implied covenant of good faith and fair dealing solely as a variant of breach of contract, in which the implied covenant is merely a "gap-filler" that expresses an unwritten contractual term that the parties would have included in their contract had they thought about it. As a result, a breach of the implied covenant generally gives rise to ordinary contractual damages. Of course, this is not the most ideal rule for plaintiffs, since consequential damages for breach of contract are subject to certain limitations (see Hadley v. Baxendale).

In certain jurisdictions, breach of the implied covenant can also give rise to a tort action, e.g. A.C. Shaw Construction v. Washoe County, 105 Nevada 913, 915, 784 P.2d 9, 10 (1989). This rule is most prevalent in insurance law, when the insurer's breach of the implied covenant may give rise to a tort action known as insurance bad faith. The advantage of tort liability is that it supports broader compensatory damages as well as the possibility of punitive damages.

Some plaintiffs have attempted to persuade courts to extend tort liability for breach of the implied covenant from insurers to other powerful defendants, like employers and banks. However, most U.S. courts have followed the example of certain landmark decisions from California courts, which rejected such tort liability against employers in 1988 and against banks in 1989.

== Contemporary usage in Canada ==
In Canadian contract law, there are two distinct duties requiring parties to act in good faith. The first, pertaining to pre-contractual relations, is a duty to negotiate in good faith, while the second is a duty to act honestly in the performance of contractual obligations. The two duties are equally relevant to both Québec's civil law and the other provinces' and territories' common law approaches to contract law, representing an attempt by the Supreme Court of Canada to extend the duties of good faith embedded in Québecois law to the jurisprudence of the country's common law jurisdictions. Additionally, in the common law provinces and territories, the doctrine of estoppel is another way in which the courts restrict the ability of parties in a contract to act in bad faith.

=== Duty to negotiate in good faith ===
The duty to negotiate in good faith is enshrined in Québecois contract law by the broader obligation on individual's to exercise their civil rights in good faith and has been recognised in certain circumstances in the common law jurisdictions. In Québec, this right is grounded in section 1375 of the civil code, which provides that parties to a contract must act in good faith not only at the time an obligation is performed but also "at the time the obligation arises". While English common law did not traditionally recognise a duty to negotiate in good faith, Canadian contract law recognises the duty where an imbalance in bargaining power exists between the parties to a contract. Circumstances giving rise to this duty include: negotiations between franchisors and franchisees, insurers and insured parties, contracts pertaining to marriages and separation agreements, invitations to tender, and fiduciary relationships. Courts may also recognise a duty to negotiate in good faith in situations involving a pre-existing relationship between the parties, particularly where the negotiation pertains to collateral terms in an otherwise complete contract, as well as in situations where parties to an oral contract have agreed to negotiate the terms to be recorded in a written contract. In circumstances where one party has incurred expenses in anticipation of a contract and the other party withdraws, in bad faith, from negotiations; the violation of the duty to negotiate in good faith may entitle the aggrieved party to restitutionary damages.

With regard to invitations to tender, this duty is applied in the form of the Contract A doctrine. A "process contract", referred to as "Contract A", is formed between the owner (person, company or organisation tendering the project) and each bidder when a "request for proposal" is responded to in the form of a compliant bid, sometimes also known as submission of price. The owner must deal fairly and equally with all bidders, and must not show any favouritism or prejudice towards any bidder(s). In essence, this concept boils down to the right of an individual to have equal opportunity to be successful with their bid for work. A breach of Contract A may occur if the owner (or an owner's officer or representative, see vicarious liability), provides information, changes specification during the tendering process to unfairly benefit a particular bidder, enters into closed negotiations with an individual bidder in an effort to obtain more desirable contract conditions, etc. The most common situation in which an owner is accused of having breached Contract A occurs when a bidder is selected who is not the lowest bidder. This contravenes established custom and practice, which would normally dictate that the lowest bid be awarded the subsequent contract to perform the work, Contract B, but is not normally a source of a breach if handled properly. Successful suits for breach typically occur where the lowest bidder is excluded based on a clause or stipulation that is either not clearly outlined in the tender documents (such as preference for local bidders) or is deemed by the courts to be too broadly worded to have any meaning.

=== Duty of honest contractual performance ===
The duty of honest contractual performance (referred to in Québec as the doctrine of abuse of rights) is a contractual duty and implied term of a contract. In Québec, it is rooted in sections 6 and 7 of the civil code which provide that "every person is bound to exercise his civil rights in accordance with the requirements of good faith" and that "no right may be exercised with the intent of injuring another or in an excessive and unreasonable manner, and therefore contrary to the requirements of good faith". It was extended to Canada's common law provinces and territories as a result of the decision of the Supreme Court of Canada in the case of Bhasin v. Hrynew. In essence, this duty requires parties to a contract to act in good faith and with honesty in exercising their rights under a contract and in delivering their obligations under a contract. This duty prohibits parties to a contract from "[lying] or otherwise knowingly mislead[ing] each other about matters directly linked to the performance of the contract". While it is also currently an integral part of the jurisprudence of Canada's common law provinces and territories, the duty of honest contractual performance is rooted in the civil law doctrine of abuse of rights and the Supreme Court of Canada has established that precedent from Québecois contract law is applicable to interpreting this duty in cases arising in the country's common law jurisdictions and vice versa. Consequently, in all Canadian jurisdictions, this duty is rooted in articles 6, 7, and 1375 of the Civil Code of Québec; with article 7 in particular providing that "no right may be exercised with the intent of injuring another or in an excessive and unreasonable manner". While this duty does not serve to extinguish or negate a party's rights under a contract, it serves to limit the manner in which parties to a contract may exercise their rights by mandating that parties must act in "good faith both at the time the obligation arises and at the time it is performed or extinguished".

=== Estoppel ===
Estoppel is an equitable remedy whereby a contracting party may not rely on the terms of a contract if, "by its words or conduct", it led the other party to believe that certain terms in the contract will be ignored, interpreted in a particular way, or given a less strict construction. One type of estoppel recognised in Canada's common law jurisdictions is estoppel by convention, which operates where three criteria are satisfied: 1) a "manifest representation" of a "shared assumption of fact or law" pertaining to the application or construction of a contractual term, 2) one party acts in reliance of the "shared assumption" in a manner that alters its legal position, 3) the party that acted in reliance shows that it did so reasonably and would be significantly harmed if the term is strictly enforced. The Ontario Court of Appeal has held that the "shared assumption" required to invoke estoppel by convention does not need to arise as a representation by the party seeking enforcement of the contractual term. Two distinct but related types of estoppel recognised in Canada are promissory estoppel or estoppel by representation, which enables courts to enforce a promise or representation by one party to a contract stating that it will not invoke a particular term of a contract or rely upon a particular provision of law if the other party has acted to its own detriment in reliance on such a promise or representation. In Canada's common law provinces and territories, these categories of estoppel serve to require parties to a contract to act in good faith in invoking contractual terms.

== Contemporary usage in Europe ==
English private law has traditionally been averse to general clauses and has repeatedly rejected the adoption of good faith as a core concept of private law. Since 1973, EU law has injected the notion of "good faith" into confined areas of English private law. The majority of these EU interventions have concerned the protection of consumers in their interactions with businesses. Only Directive 86/653/EEC on the co-ordination of the laws of the member states relating to self-employed commercial agents has brought "good faith" to English commercial law.

=== Continental practice ===
On the European continent, good faith is often strongly rooted in the legal framework. In the German-speaking area, the term Treu und Glauben has a firm legal value, for instance in Switzerland, where Article 5(3) of the Swiss Federal Constitution states that the state and private actors must act in good faith. This leads to the assumption, for example in contracts, that all parties have signed in good faith, so that any missing or unclear aspect of a contract is to be interpreted based on an assumption of the good faith of all parties. In the Netherlands, the phrase redelijkheid en billijkheid (art. 6:248 BW) has significant legal value.

=== United Kingdom ===
In Walford v Miles (1992), the House of Lords ruled that an agreement to negotiate in good faith for an unspecified period is not enforceable, and a term to that effect could not be implied into a lock-out agreement (an agreement not to negotiate with anyone except the opposite party) for an unspecified period, since the lock-out agreement did not oblige the vendor to conclude a contract with the intended purchaser.

The High Court in Gold Group Properties v BDW Trading Ltd. in 2010 considered the nature and extent of an obligation "to act at all times in good faith", finding that this obligation does not impose a fiduciary duty whereby the party concerned would be required to abandon the pursuit of its own self-interest. (Note: An earlier ruling in the dispute between these parties had established that the contract between them had not been frustrated.) A contractual commitment to act in good faith serves "to qualify self-interest, requiring that both parties act so as to allow both to enjoy the anticipated benefits of the contract".

== Australia ==
The concept of good faith was established in the insurance industry following the events of Carter v Boehm (an English contract law case in 1766), and is enshrined in the Insurance Contracts Act 1984 (ICA). The act stipulates, in Section 13, obligations of all parties within a contract to act with utmost good faith. The New South Wales Court of Appeal case Burger King Corporation v Hungry Jack's Pty Ltd (2001) was also concerned with good faith and referred to an earlier case, Renard Constructions v Minister for Public Works (1992).

== India ==
In the Indian Penal Code, "good faith" is defined under section 52 as "Nothing is said to be done or believed in 'good faith' which is done or believed without due care and attention." The privy council expanded on this meaning in the case of Muhammad Ishaq v The Emperor (1914), in which it held that an action taken by the defendant based on a belief of having a decree passed in his favor was illegal, since he could have found out that he did not enjoy any such favorable decree if he had inquired with a little more care and attention.

== See also ==
- Good-faith exception
- Yam Seng Pte Ltd v International Trade Corp Ltd
