= Canadian contract law =

Overview of contract law in Canada

Canadian contract law is composed of two parallel systems: a common law framework outside Québec and a civil law framework within Québec. Outside Québec, Canadian contract law is derived from English contract law, though it has developed distinctly since Canadian Confederation in 1867. While Québecois contract law was originally derived from that which existed in France at the time of Québec's annexation into the British Empire, it was overhauled and codified first in the Civil Code of Lower Canada and later in the current Civil Code of Quebec, which codifies most elements of contract law as part of its provisions on the broader law of obligations. Individual common law provinces have codified certain contractual rules in a Sale of Goods Act, resembling equivalent statutes elsewhere in the Commonwealth. As most aspects of contract law in Canada are the subject of provincial jurisdiction under the Canadian Constitution, contract law may differ even between the country's common law provinces and territories. Conversely; as the law regarding bills of exchange and promissory notes, trade and commerce (including competition law), maritime law, and banking among other related areas is governed by federal law under Section 91 of the Constitution Act, 1867; aspects of contract law pertaining to these topics (particularly in the field of international shipping and transportation) are harmonised between Québec and the common law provinces.

== Interpretation ==
Contracts in all Canadian jurisdictions are generally interpreted in a manner that balances giving the fullest possible effect to the intent of the parties while protecting the public interest and contracting parties with less bargaining power. Canadian courts, particularly each province's superior court, are responsible for the interpretation of contracts in legal disputes. Outside Québec, the rules of contractual interpretation are established by judicial precedent and broadly resemble those in other Commonwealth jurisdictions. Within Québec, the rules of contractual interpretation are codified in the civil code.

In Québec, the civil code provides several specific rules regarding contractual interpretation in Book Five, Title One, Chapter 2, Division 4. Section 1425 provides that the common intention of the contracting parties shall be prioritised over the literal meaning of the words in a written document purporting to embody the contract Section 1426 requires courts to take into account a contract's nature, the circumstances in which it was formed, customs and usages, and any prior interpretation it may have received. Each clause of a contract is required by section 1427 to be interpreted in the context of the others so that each is given a meaning derived from the contract as a whole. While section 1430 provides that a clause intended to eliminate doubt as to the application of the contract to a specific situation does not restrict the scope of a contract otherwise expressed in general terms, section 1431 provides that the clauses of a contract cover only what it appears that the parties intended to include, however general the terms used. Section 1432 codifies the English doctrine of contra proferentem.

== Formation and validity ==
=== Québec ===
The rules governing the formation of a contract under Québecois law are codified in Book Five, Title One, Chapter 2, Division 3 of the Civil Code. Except where a specific provision of law requires otherwise, a contract is formed by the exchange of consent between persons with the capacity enter into a contract. Additionally, a valid contract must have a cause and an object. The cause of a contract is the reason that determines each of the parties to enter into the contract, and does not need to be explicitly expressed in the contract. The object of a contract is the juridical operation (i.e. exchange of one or more legal rights) contemplated by the parties at the time of the contract's formation. An object is only valid if it is not prohibited by law or on grounds of public policy. A contract which does not meet the conditions of its formation may be annulled .

The exchange of consent required for the formation of a contract is generally accomplished in the form of an offer and acceptance. An offer to contract is a proposal which contains all the essential elements of the proposed contract and in which the offeror signifies his willingness to be bound if it is accepted. An offer to contract is made by the person who initiates the contract, the determines its content, or presents the last essential element of the proposed contract. An offer to contract may be made to a determinate or an indeterminate person, and a fixed time period for its acceptance may, but is not required to, be included. Where a term is attached, the offer may not be revoked before the period expires; if none is attached, the offer may be revoked at any time before acceptance is received by the offeror. Where the offeree receives a revocation before the offer, the offer lapses, even though a term is attached to it. An offer expires if an acceptance is not received by the offeror before the stated time period (if one is provided) or within a reasonable time period (if none is provided), as well as if the offeror receives a rejection or if either the offeror or the offeree die or enter insolvency before an acceptance is received by the offeror. Where a purported acceptance is received either after the expiry of the applicable time period or which substantially modifies the terms of the proposed contract, it instead constitutes a counter-offer.

Consent in Québecois contract law may only be given by an individual with the legal capacity to bind themselves, and must be "free and enlightened". It may be vitiated by error, fear, or lesion (i.e. unconscionability). A person whose consent is vitiated has the right to apply for annulment of the contract; in the case of error occasioned by fraud, of fear or of lesion, he may, in addition to annulment, also claim damages or, where he prefers that the contract be maintained, apply for a reduction of his obligation equivalent to the damages he would be justified in claiming. Error vitiates the consent of the parties or of one of them where the error relates to the nature of the contract, to the object of the prestation or to any essential element that determined the consent; but inexcusable error may not constitute a defect of consent. Error induced by the other party's fraud or with the other party's knowledge vitiates a party's consent. Fear of serious injury to the person or property of one of the parties vitiates their consent if the fear is induced by violence or threats exerted or made by or known to the other party or induced by abuse of power or a threat thereof. Lesion results from the exploitation of one of the parties by the other, which creates a serious disproportion between the prestations of the parties; the fact that there is a serious disproportion creates a presumption of exploitation. In cases involving a minor or a protected person of full age, lesion may also result from an obligation that is considered to be excessive in view of the patrimonial situation of the person, the advantages he gains from the contract and the circumstances as a whole.

=== Common law provinces ===
In Canada's common law provinces and territories three components are required for the formation of a valid contract: offer, acceptance, and consideration. Additionally, the parties themselves must have the legal capacity and the intention to create legal relations.

==== Offer and acceptance ====
An offer must be some indication of the offeror to the offeree that he is prepared to form a binding legal agreement. Intention is measured objectively. Commercial deals are presumed to be of a legal nature while an agreement made between family members or in a social engagement is presumed not to be of a legal nature. Acceptance is the promise or act on the part of an offeree indicating a willingness to be bound by the terms and conditions contained in an offer. An acceptance must be an absolute and unqualified acceptance of all the terms of the offer: Sec.7(1). If there is any variation, even on an unimportant point, between the offer and the terms of its acceptance, there is no contract. An acceptance is only contractually valid if the proposal to which response is made is an offer capable of acceptance.

Often, when two companies deal with each other in the course of business, they will use standard form contracts. Often these standard forms contain terms which conflict (e.g. both parties include a liability waiver in their form). The 'battle of the forms' refers to the resulting legal dispute arising where both parties accept that a legally binding contract exists, but disagree about whose standard terms apply. Such disputes may be resolved by reference to the 'last document rule', i.e. whichever business sent the last document, or 'fired the last shot' (often the seller's delivery note) is held to have issued the final offer and the buyer's organisation is held to have accepted the offer by signing the delivery note or simply accepting and using the delivered goods.

An offer must also be distinguished from an invitation to treat, which is where one party invites another party to consider a deal. Advertisements are also considered invitations. Exceptions are made in circumstances where a unilateral contract for performance is offered or where the advertisement is sufficiently serious about its promise such as in the famous Carlill v. Carbolic Smoke Ball Co.. In the similar case of Goldthorpe v. Logan, [1943] 2 DLR 519 (Ont CA) an "absolute and unqualified" guarantee to safely remove all hair by electrolysis, was found to be an offer as the plaintiff paid for the treatment on the basis of the offer. The display of goods in store is typically an invitation. The quotation of the lowest price is also considered an invitation. However, in some circumstances a quotation will be an offer. In Canadian Dyers Association Ltd. v. Burton, [1920] 47 OLR 259 (HC), a quotation followed by the statement "if it were anyone else I would ask for more" was considered an offer. A call for tenders is usually considered an invitation. In R. v. Ron Engineering & Construction Ltd., [1981] 1 S.C.R. 111, however, the Supreme Court found that a call was an offer where there the call was sufficiently "contract-like". Later, in M.J.B. Enterprises Ltd. v Defence Construction (1951) Ltd., the Court again found a call to be an offer which was accepted with the tender submission (known as Contract A). In Tercon Contractors Ltd. v. British Columbia (Transportation and Highways), the trial judge summarised the factors to be considered in deciding whether a matter constitutes a call for tenders or a non-binding request for proposals:

- the irrevocability of the bid,
- the formality of the procurement process,
- whether tenders are solicited from selected parties,
- whether there was anonymity of tenders,
- whether there is a deadline for submissions and for performance of the work,
- whether there is a requirement for security deposit,
- whether evaluation criteria are specified,
- whether there was a right to reject proposals,
- whether there was a statement that this was not a tender call,
- whether there was a commitment to build,
- whether compliance with specifications was a condition of the tender bid,
- whether there is a duty to award contract B, and
- whether contract B had specific conditions not open to negotiation

The label or name of the tender document is not a determinative factor. Neither is the requirement for a security deposit or the existence of established timelines.

==== Consideration ====
In common law jurisdictions, consideration is required for simple contracts but not for special contracts (contracts by deed). This means that each party to a contract is required to exchange something of value and that a gratuitous contract is not valid in Canada's common law provinces and territories. Where one party retains discretion over the performance of an obligation under a contract, that obligation constitutes a "mere option" and therefore cannot serve as valid consideration. While the purpose of the doctrine was ostensibly to protect parties seeking to void oppressive contracts, this goal is currently accomplished through the use of legal principles enabling the recission or annulment of contracts on the grounds of unconscionability, through purposive interpretation of contracts by the courts, and through equitable remedies. In practice, the doctrine of consideration has resulted in a phenomenon similar to that of Ḥiyal in Islamic contracts, whereby parties to a contract use technicalities to satisfy requirements while in fact circumventing them in practice. Typically, this is in the form of "peppercorn" consideration, i.e. consideration that is negligible but still satisfies the requirements of law, although Canadian courts may evaluate consideration for "sufficiency".

The requirement for consideration is the most significant difference between contract law in Québec and the common law provinces. At the international level, it is expressly rejected by the UNIDROIT Principles of International Commercial Contracts on the grounds that it yields uncertainty and unnecessary litigation, thereby hindering international trade. Similarly, the United Nations Convention on Contracts for the International Sale of Goods does not require consideration for a contract to be valid, thereby excluding the doctrine with regard to contracts covered by the convention even in common law jurisdictions where it would otherwise apply. Consequently, the continued existence of the doctrine in common law jurisdictions is controversial.

In Canadian common law jurisdictions, like in England and Wales but unlike in India, the performance of pre-existing duties has not traditionally been regarded as good consideration. This can create uncertainty where parties to a contract agree to amend its terms after it has been concluded since such post-contractual modifications may run afoul of the requirement for fresh consideration. Court rulings in New Brunswick and British Columbia have abrogated this rule with regard to post-contractual modifications, while courts in Ontario have continued to require fresh consideration.

=== Contracts for the International Sale of Goods ===
In Canada, as in the vast majority of jurisdictions, the Convention on Contracts for the International Sale of Goods (CISG) governs contracts concerning the international sale of goods. The CISG facilitates international trade by removing legal barriers among state parties (known as "Contracting States") and providing uniform rules that govern most aspects of a commercial transactions, such as contract formation, the means of delivery, parties' obligations, and remedies for breach of contract. Unless expressly excluded by the contract, the convention is automatically incorporated into the domestic laws of Contracting States. Consequently, the criteria for the creation of contracts for the international sale of goods are substantially harmonised among civil, common, and mixed law jurisdictions around the world.

The CISG applies to contracts of the sale of goods between parties whose places of business are in different States, when the States are Contracting States (United Nations Convention on Contracts for the International Sale of Goods, Article 1(1)(a)). Given the significant number of Contracting States, this is the usual path to the CISG's applicability. The CISG also applies if the parties are situated in different countries (which need not be Contracting States) and the conflict of law rules lead to the application of the law of a Contracting State. For example, a contract between a Japanese trader and a Brazilian trader may contain a clause that arbitration will be in Toronto under Ontarian law with the consequence that the CISG would apply. While a number of States have declared they will not be bound by this condition, Canada has not. The CISG is intended to apply to commercial goods and products only. With some limited exceptions, it does not apply to personal, family, or household goods, nor does it apply to auctions, ships, aircraft, or intangibles and services. The position of computer software is 'controversial' and will depend upon various conditions and situations. Importantly, parties to a contract may exclude or vary the application of the CISG.

Under the CISG, an offer to contract must be addressed to a person, be sufficiently definite – that is, describe the goods, quantity, and price – and indicate an intention for the offeror to be bound on acceptance. The CISG does not appear to recognise common law unilateral contracts but, subject to clear indication by the offeror, treats any proposal not addressed to a specific person as only an invitation to make an offer. Further, where there is no explicit price or procedure to implicitly determine price, then the parties are assumed to have agreed upon a price based upon that 'generally charged at the time of the conclusion of the contract for such goods sold under comparable circumstances'. Generally, an offer may be revoked provided the withdrawal reaches the offeree before or at the same time as the offer, or before the offeree has sent an acceptance. Some offers may not be revoked; for example when the offeree reasonably relied upon the offer as being irrevocable. The CISG requires a positive act to indicate acceptance; silence or inactivity are not an acceptance. The CISG attempts to resolve the common situation where an offeree's reply to an offer accepts the original offer, but attempts to change the conditions. The CISG says that any change to the original conditions is a rejection of the offer—it is a counter-offer—unless the modified terms do not materially alter the terms of the offer. Changes to price, payment, quality, quantity, delivery, liability of the parties, and arbitration conditions may all materially alter the terms of the offer.

=== Maritime law ===
Canadian maritime law is a distinct jurisdiction and area of law within the legislative purview of Parliament rather than the provincial legislatures and, as such, is uniform across the country. Consequently; contracts of carriage, maritime insurance contracts, and other contracts related to maritime transportation are subject to a distinct legal system derived from English admiralty law. In Ordon Estate v. Grail, the Supreme Court of Canada stated that "the substantive content of Canadian maritime law is...the body of law administered in England by the High Court on its Admiralty side in 1934, as that body of law has been amended by the Canadian Parliament and as it has developed by judicial precedent", and that "most of Canadian maritime law with respect to issues of tort, contract, agency and bailment is founded upon the English common law" but nevertheless that "English admiralty law as incorporated into Canadian law in 1934 was an amalgam of principles deriving in large part from both the common law and the civilian tradition". The formation of contracts under Canadian maritime law thus functions similarly but not identically to the formation of contracts in the country's common law provinces; furthermore, the implementation of rules derived from international conventions subject maritime contracts to distinct rules often derived from international norms.

=== Bills of exchange and promissory notes ===
Bills of exchange and promissory notes are two distinct types of contractual instrument subject to a distinct legal framework under which the rules governing their formation, validity, and nature is governed by federal rather than provincial law, and are thus harmonised between Québec and the common law provinces. A bill of exchange is "an unconditional order in writing, addressed by one person to another, signed by the person giving it, requiring the person to whom it is addressed to pay, on demand or at a fixed or determinable future time, a sum certain in money to or to the order of a specified person or to bearer". A bill of exchange requires three parties: the drawer, the drawee, and the payee. The drawer gives the order to pay money to the third party while the drawee, whose identity must be "indicated...with reasonable certainty", is the person to whom the bill is addressed and who is ordered to pay. The drawee becomes an acceptor when they indicate their willingness to pay the bill, and the drawee's acceptance is required in order for the contract represented by the bill of exchange to come into existence. The payee is the person in whose favour the bill is drawn or is payable. The parties need not all be distinct persons. The most common type of bill of exchange used by the general public is the cheque, defined as a bill of exchange drawn on a banker and payable on demand. Bills of exchange are used primarily in international trade, and are written orders by one person to their bank to pay the bearer a specific sum on a specific date. A promissory note, on the other hand, is a legal instrument (more particularly, a financing instrument and a debt instrument), in which one party (the maker or issuer) makes an unconditional to pay a determinate sum of money to the other (the payee), either at a fixed or determinable future time or on demand of the payee, under specific terms and conditions. Although possibly non-negotiable, a promissory note may be a negotiable instrument if it is an unconditional promise in writing made by one person to another, signed by the maker, engaging to pay on demand to the payee, or at fixed or determinable future time, a sum certain in money, to order or to bearer. Banknotes are often regarded as promissory notes. The Bills of Exchange Act codifies the rules of formation and validity of both bills of exchange and promissory notes in Canada.

A bill of exchange or a promissory note may be either negotiable or non-negotiable, with negotiable instruments being indefinitely assignable and associated contractual performance (i.e. payment) guaranteed to the holder in due course. The holder in due course of a bill of exchange or a promissory note has the following rights protected under the act which are distinct from and qualitatively superior to those of parties to ordinary contracts:

(a) he may sue on the bill in his own name;

(b) where he is a holder in due course, he holds the bill free from any defect of title of prior parties, as well as from mere personal defences available to prior parties among themselves, and may enforce payment against all parties liable on the bill;

(c) where his title is defective, if he negotiates the bill to a holder in due course, that holder obtains a good and complete title to the bill; and

(d) where his title is defective, if he obtains payment of the bill, the person who pays him in due course gets a valid discharge for the bill.

As Canadian law regarding bills of exchange and promissory notes is derived from English common law, consideration is required for the issue of a valid bill of exchange or promissory note. The Bills of Exchange Act provides that the requirement for consideration may be satisfied either by "any consideration sufficient to support a simple contract" in the country's common law provinces and territories or by "an antecedent debt or liability".

While only a party with legal capacity is able to incur liability under a bill of exchange or promissory note, legal capacity under the Bills of Exchange Act is defined as being "coextensive with capacity to contract" under the most relevant provincial or territorial law. Similarly, the capacity of a corporation to do so is determined by the law under which it is incorporated, which may be the federal Canada Business Corporations Act (in which case the relevant provincial or territorial law may be determined with reference to the location of the corporation's registered office) or a provincial act. Consequently, questions of capacity are largely determined under the contract law of the relevant province or territory.

The following chart shows the main differences between bills of exchange and promissory notes:

	Bill of exchange	Promissory note
Name	The name of the bill or note in the text of the document, in the language the document has been issued in	
Subject	Unconditional order for the payment of the specified sum	Unconditional assumption of obligation for the payment of the specified sum
Drawee	The name of the person obliged to pay (drawee)	N/A
Date	The specification of the maturity	
Place of payment	Specification of the place of payment	
Payee	The name of the person to whose behalf the payment must be effected	
Issue date	The specification of the date and place of the issuance of the bill or note	
Signature	The signature of the drawer	The signature of the issuer

== Duties and equitable doctrines ==
In Canadian contract law, there are two distinct duties requiring parties to act in good faith. The first, pertaining to pre-contractual relations, is a duty to negotiate in good faith, while the second is a duty to act honestly in the performance of contractual obligations. The two duties are equally relevant to both Québec's civil law and the other provinces' and territories' common law approaches to contract law, representing an attempt by the Supreme Court of Canada to extend the duties of good faith embedded in Québecois law to the jurisprudence of the country's common law jurisdictions. Additionally, in the common law provinces and territories, the doctrine of estoppel is another way in which the courts restrict the ability of parties in a contract to act in bad faith. Another important equitable doctrine in Canadian contract law is that of unconscionability, whereby the enforceability of a contract or of one or more terms in a contract is restricted on the grounds that it would be unjust to enforce it.

=== Duty to negotiate in good faith ===
The duty to negotiate in good faith is enshrined in Québecois contract law by the broader obligation on individual's to exercise their civil rights in good faith and has been recognised in certain circumstances in the common law jurisdictions. In Québec, this right is grounded in section 1375 of the civil code, which provides that parties to a contract must act in good faith not only at the time an obligation is performed but also "at the time the obligation arises". While English common law did not traditionally recognise a duty to negotiate in good faith, Canadian contract law recognises the duty where an imbalance in bargaining power exists between the parties to a contract. Circumstances giving rise to this duty include: negotiations between franchisors and franchisees, insurers and insured parties, contracts pertaining to marriages and separation agreements, invitations to tender, and fiduciary relationships. Courts may also recognise a duty to negotiate in good faith in situations involving a pre-existing relationship between the parties, particularly where the negotiation pertains to collateral terms in an otherwise complete contract, as well as in situations where parties to an oral contract have agreed to negotiate the terms to be recorded in a written contract. In circumstances where one party has incurred expenses in anticipation of a contract and the other party withdraws, in bad faith, from negotiations; the violation of the duty to negotiate in good faith may entitle the aggrieved party to restitutionary damages.

==== Tendering ====
With regard to invitations to tender, this duty is applied in the form of the Contract A doctrine. A "process contract", referred to as "Contract A", is formed between the owner (person, company or organisation tendering the project) and each bidder when a "request for proposal" is responded to in the form of a compliant bid, sometimes also known as submission of price. The owner must deal fairly and equally with all bidders, and must not show any favouritism or prejudice towards any bidder(s). In essence, this concept boils down to the right of an individual to have equal opportunity to be successful with their bid for work. A breach of Contract A may occur if the owner (or an owner's officer or representative, see vicarious liability), provides information, changes specification during the tendering process to unfairly benefit a particular bidder, enters into closed negotiations with an individual bidder in an effort to obtain more desirable contract conditions, etc. The most common situation in which an owner is accused of having breached Contract A occurs when a bidder is selected who is not the lowest bidder. This contravenes established custom and practice, which would normally dictate that the lowest bid be awarded the subsequent contract to perform the work, Contract B, but is not normally a source of a breach if handled properly. Successful suits for breach typically occur where the lowest bidder is excluded based on a clause or stipulation that is either not clearly outlined in the tender documents (such as preference for local bidders) or is deemed by the courts to be too broadly worded to have any meaning.

=== Duty of honest contractual performance ===
The duty of honest contractual performance (referred to in Québec as the doctrine of abuse of rights) is a contractual duty and implied term of a contract. In Québec, it is rooted in sections 6 and 7 of the civil code which provide that "every person is bound to exercise his civil rights in accordance with the requirements of good faith" and that "no right may be exercised with the intent of injuring another or in an excessive and unreasonable manner, and therefore contrary to the requirements of good faith". It was extended to Canada's common law provinces and territories as a result of the decision of the Supreme Court of Canada in the case of Bhasin v. Hrynew. In essence, this duty requires parties to a contract to act in good faith and with honesty in exercising their rights under a contract and in delivering their obligations under a contract. This duty prohibits parties to a contract from "[lying] or otherwise knowingly mislead[ing] each other about matters directly linked to the performance of the contract”. While it is also currently an integral part of the jurisprudence of Canada's common law provinces and territories, the duty of honest contractual performance is rooted in the civil law doctrine of abuse of rights and the Supreme Court of Canada has established that precedent from Québecois contract law is applicable to interpreting this duty in cases arising in the country's common law jurisdictions and vice-versa. Consequently, in all Canadian jurisdictions, this duty is rooted in articles 6, 7, and 1375 of the Civil Code of Québec; with article 7 in particular providing that "no right may be exercised with the intent of injuring another or in an excessive and unreasonable manner". While this duty does not serve to extinguish or negate a party's rights under a contract, it serves to limit the manner in which parties to a contract may exercise their rights by mandating that parties must act in "good faith both at the time the obligation arises and at the time it is performed or extinguished".

=== Estoppel ===
Estoppel is an equitable remedy whereby a contracting party may not rely on the terms of a contract if, "by its words or conduct", it led the other party to believe that certain terms in the contract will be ignored, interpreted in a particular way, or given a less strict construction. One type of estoppel recognised in Canada's common law jurisdictions is estoppel by convention, which operates where three criteria are satisfied: 1) a "manifest representation" of a "shared assumption of fact or law" pertaining to the application or construction of a contractual term, 2) one party acts in reliance of the "shared assumption" in a manner that alters its legal position, 3) the party that acted in reliance shows that it did so reasonably and would be significantly harmed if the term is strictly enforced. The Ontario Court of Appeal has held that the "shared assumption" required to invoke estoppel by convention does not need to arise as a representation by the party seeking enforcement of the contractual term. Two distinct but related types of estoppel recognised in Canada are promissory estoppel or estoppel by representation, which enables courts to enforce a promise or representation by one party to a contract stating that it will not invoke a particular term of a contract or rely upon a particular provision of law if the other party has acted to its own detriment in reliance on such a promise or representation. In Canada's common law provinces and territories, these categories of estoppel serve to require parties to a contract to act in good faith in invoking contractual terms.

=== Unconscionability ===
Unconscionability is a doctrine in Canadian contract law that restricts the enforceability of "unfair agreements that resulted from an inequality of bargaining power". The test for unconscionability applied by Canadian courts is to determine whether there was an inequality of bargaining power between the parties to the contract and, if so, whether this inequality resulted in the contract being an "improvident bargain" for the party with lesser bargaining power. The inequality criterion is satisfied where one party is unable to sufficiently protect its interests while negotiating the contract, while the improvidence criterion is satisfied where the contract "unduly advantages the stronger party or unduly disadvantages the more vulnerable". Improvidence must be measured with reference to the time of the contract's formation and involves a contextual assessment of "whether the potential for undue advantage or disadvantage created by the inequality of bargaining power has been realised". Unlike the duty to negotiate in good faith; the doctrine of unconscionability, which applies to contracts in all contexts, does not require the party with greater bargaining power to have intentionally taken advantage of the weaker party or otherwise have acted in bad faith. It is particularly relevant in the context of standard form contracts; especially with regard to choice of law, choice of court, or forum selection clauses. Where the disadvantaged party understood the improvident terms of the contract, the contract is unconscionable if they were so reliant on the advantaged party that they assented out of perceived necessity; meanwhile, where the disadvantaged party did not understand the improvident terms, "the focus is on whether they have been unduly disadvantaged by the terms they did not understand or appreciate". The intended purpose of the doctrine of unconscionability is "the protection of vulnerable persons in transactions with others".

== Nominate contracts ==
Both Québec and the common law provinces and territories have enacted special rules for certain categories of contracts, specifying standard rules and conditions applying to these contracts.

=== Contracts for the sale of goods ===
Both the Civil Code of Québec and statutes in the common law provinces provide for certain standard rules in relation to contracts for the sale of goods. The purpose of these provisions is to ensure that parties to sale of goods contracts, particularly buyers, are protected from unfair conduct and defective products. While the purposes underlying both are similar, there are substantive differences in the provisions themselves.

In Québec, a sales contract is defined as "a contract by which a person, the seller, transfers ownership of property to another person, the buyer, for a price in money". The code provides for a series of protections for both buyers and sellers, and defines the statutory obligations of each. In terms of protections for sellers, the code provides that "a person charged with the sale of the property of another" is not permitted to acquire such property including through an intermediary and that the sale of property by a person other than its owner or a person authorised to sell it may be declared null unless the seller later acquires ownership of the property in question. In terms of protections for buyers, the code provides that "the promise of sale with delivery and actual possession is equivalent to sale". In terms of obligations, the code provides that buyers have the obligation to "take delivery of the product sold", "pay the price thereof at the time and place of delivery", "pay any expenses related to the act of sale", and to pay "interest on the sale price" either "from the time of delivery of the property" or after the expiry of a period agreed by the parties. The code provides for four distinct obligations owed by sellers:

1) Delivery – This obligation is fulfilled "when the seller puts the buyer in possession of the property or consents to his taking possession of it and all hindrances are removed", provided that the property is delivered "in the condition it is in at the time of the sale" and "with all its accessories". Additionally, the seller is required to provide the buyer with the appropriate title, documents, and records as to the property's ownership and to "deliver the area, volume, or quantity specified in the contract" except where "it is obvious that the certain and determinate property was sold without regard to such area, volume or quantity".

2) Warranty of ownership – "The seller is bound to warrant the buyer that the property is free of all rights except those he has declared at the time of the sale" and "is bound to discharge the property of all hypothecs, even declared or registered, unless the buyer has assumed the debt so secured".

3) Warranty of quality – The seller must warrant that the property sold is free of any defects that would render it unfit for purpose or which would have diminished its usefulness such that the buyer either would not have purchased it or agreed to pay the price agreed.

4) Conventional warranty – A sale contract may add to or diminish from the warranties provided for by law but a seller may not contract out of liability for their own "acts or omissions".

Furthermore, the code provides that buyers and sellers have the following rights:

For buyers:

1) The right, if a seller of movable property fails to deliver, to "consider the sale resolved if the seller is in default by operation of law or if he fails to perform his obligation within the time allowed in the demand putting him in default".

2) The right, "where the seller is bound to deliver the area, volume or quantity specified in the contract and is unable to do so, ... [to] obtain a reduction of the price or, if the difference causes him serious injury, resolution of the sale".

3) The right to seek a remedy or rescission for property that is defective or subject to a third-party claim if they provide notice within a reasonable time or if the seller "was aware" or "could not have been unaware" of the defect or third-party claim.

For sellers of movable property:

1) The right to, "if the buyer fails to pay the sale price and to accept delivery of it, consider the sale resolved if the buyer is in default by operation of law or if he fails to perform his obligations within the time allowed".

2) The right, "where the sale of movable property was made without a term", to reclaim the property sold if the buyer has failed to pay and to stop the delivery of the product in transit if "it appears that the buyer will not perform a substantial part of [their] obligation".

For sellers of immovable property:

1) If the contract of sale provides for rescission in the case of non-performance of the buyer's obligations, the right to exercise such a clause within five years of the sale.

2) Where a seller invokes such a clause, the right to reclaim the property free of any security interest or hypothec.

In the common law provinces, standard provisions and rules regarding sales contracts (typically divided into "contracts for the sale of goods" and "agreements to sell") are typically codified in a statute enacted by the provincial legislature. A typical and broadly representative example of such a statute is Ontario's Sale of Goods Act, which defines a "contract for the sale of goods" as "a contract whereby the seller transfers or agrees to transfer the property in the goods to the buyer for a money consideration" and defines an "agreement to sell" as a contract "where the transfer of the property in the goods is to take place at a future time or subject to some condition thereafter to be fulfilled". The Ontarian act provides that an agreement to sell may be made with regard to "future goods" which the seller does not yet possess. A contract for the sale of goods which perish prior to delivery or which perished, without the seller's knowledge, before the contract is concluded is void. The statute provides that sellers have the duty to "deliver the goods" and buyers have the duty to "accept and pay for them", both "in accordance with the terms of the contract of sale". Part IV of the Ontarian act provides for the seller to exercise a lien over goods for which the buyer has failed to pay and to stop delivery in transit, producing a similar effect to the provisions regarding the rights of sellers of movable property under the Civil Code of Québec. Under the act, a buyer may sue for breach of contract where the seller fails to deliver the agreed goods and a seller may do so where the buyer fails to pay the agreed price. Additionally, a buyer who sues for breach of warranty is entitled to seek a reduction in the price of the goods or "maintain an action for damages". The act also codifies rules regarding how the seller is to effect delivery and provides that a failure to deliver the quantity or type of goods agreed upon entitles the buyer to either reject delivery or accept delivery, as well as the right to only accept delivery of the quantity agreed upon (where more goods are delivered than agreed) or that meet the stipulations of the contract (where a mixture of goods that comply and do not comply are delivered). Where a buyer has the right to reject delivery or only accept delivery of a portion of the goods delivered, they must notify the seller that delivery is rejected, but the goods are not required to be returned.

=== Contracts for the sale of immovable property ===
In the common law provinces and territories, standardised rules regarding the sale of land and other immovable property is typically codified in a Conveyancing and Law of Property Act while the Civil Code of Québec contains similar rules in sections 1785-1794. The Ontarian Conveyancing and Law of Property Act and the British Columbian Property Act govern the sale of immovable property in the two most populous common law provinces. The rules provided in most provinces and territories; including Québec, British Columbia, and Ontario; generally include provisions as to compliance with the province's system of land registration which may be a torrens title (British Columbia, the prairie provinces, the territories, and parts of Ontario), deeds registration (the remainder of the Common law provinces), or cadastral (Québec) system depending on the province or territory.

Additional provisions include requirements as to formalities; for instance, section 1785 of the civil code provides that a contract for the sale of residential property must be preceded by a preliminary agreement to sell under which the buyer has 10 days to withdraw from the transaction; as well as special rules governing the rights of the buyer and seller such as section 2 of British Columbia's Property Act, which provides a rebuttable presumption that "recitals of facts, statements and matters, and descriptions of parties in instruments or statutory declarations over 20 years old at the date of the contract" are true and that "the inability of a vendor to give a purchaser a legal covenant to produce and furnish copies of documents of title is not an objection to the title if the purchaser has, on the completion of the contract, an equitable right to the production of the copies that affirmatively prove his or her title". Certain provinces also prescribe an implied covenant requiring the buyer to assume all liability for any mortgage or other security right encumbering the property except where certain conditions (e.g. that the transfer of the property was, in substance, a gift) are met.

=== Contracts for the lease of immovable property ===
Each province has codified rules pertaining to leases of immovable property, with additional rules applying specifically in the case of residential leases. In Québec, the rules are provided for in the CCQ while other provinces have enacted statutes with provisions specifically designed by the provincial legislature. There are broad similarities in the rules prescribed for leases, particularly with regard to residential tenancies, since the law regarding leases of immovable property in Canada has evolved post-Confederation in order to address the needs of the country's continually growing population of renters as well as the rise of property as an investment commodity; thus, the largest influences on each province have been legislation adopted by other provinces and the need to ensure legal uniformity for property investors. While the rules prescribing and limiting the contents of leases/tenancy agreements are specific and vary from province to province, such contracts generally subject to provincial human rights legislation (e.g. the Quebec Charter of Human Rights and Freedoms, the Human Rights Codes of Ontario and British Columbia, and the Saskatchewan Bill of Rights) which prohibit discrimination on prescribed characteristics against tenants and potential tenants. The Supreme Court's ruling in Vriend v Alberta generally requires provincial human rights legislation to provide protection at least on the basis of both the enumerated and analogous characteristics protected by Section 15 of the Canadian Charter of Rights and Freedoms. In all provinces, specialised human rights tribunals (such as the Human Rights Tribunals of Ontario and Québec) have jurisdiction over complaints brought under human rights legislation, while violations of provisions specifically applicable to residential tenancy contracts may fall either within the jurisdiction of specialised tribunals such as Ontario's Landlord and Tenant Board.

==== Québec ====
In Québec, a lease is defined as "a contract by which a person, the lessor, undertakes to provide another person, the lessee, in return for a rent, with" a specified property; and, as in the common law provinces, a lease may be fixed or indeterminate. The lessor is bound to warrant the lessee against legal disturbances to enjoyment of the leased property. A lessee is bound to act in such a way as not to disturb the normal enjoyment of the other lessees A lessee who is disturbed by another lessee or by persons whom another lessee allows to use or to have access to the property may obtain, according to the circumstances, a reduction of rent or the resiliation of the lease, if they notified the common lessor of the disturbance and if the disturbance persists. The lessee is bound to make reparation for injury suffered by the lessor by reason of any loss sustained by the leased property, unless he proves that the loss is not due to his fault or that of persons they permit to use or access the property; additionally, the lessee is not bound for injury resulting from a fire unless it is proved that the fire was due to his fault or that of persons he allowed to have access to the immovable.

The lessor is bound, during the term of the lease, to make all necessary repairs to the leased property other than minor maintenance repairs not caused by age or force majeure. The lessee shall allow urgent and necessary repairs to be made to ensure the preservation or enjoyment of the leased property; correspondingly, a lessor may require the lessee to temporarily vacate an immovable if necessary for urgent repairs.

A lessee may sublease all or part of the leased property or assign the lease. In either case, they are bound to give the lessor notice of his intention and the name and address of the intended sublessee or assignee and to obtain the lessor’s consent to the sublease or assignment. A lessor is required to permit a sublease unless there is a serious reason not to, in which case they must inform the lessee of their reasons within 15 days, after which the lessor is presumed to have consented to the sublease. A lessee similarly has the right to assign their lease, governed by the same limitations and the assignment of a lease terminates the obligations of the original lessee unless the parties agree otherwise

A fixed term lease terminates by operation of law upon the expiration of the term while an indeterminate lease terminates at the instance of one of the parties thereof. A fixed term lease of an immovable may be renewed either expressly or tacitly by acquiescence. A lease is renewed tacitly by either 1 year or the period of the original lease, whichever is shorter, if the lessee continues to occupy the premises for more than 10 days after the expiry of the lease without opposition from the lessor.

Special rules apply to the lease of a residential dwelling (Note: The lease of a room, of a mobile home placed on a chassis, with or without a permanent foundation, or of land intended for the emplacement of a mobile home is considered to be the lease of a dwelling.) including leases relating to the services, accessories and dependencies attached to a dwelling, a room, a mobile home or land, and to services of a personal nature provided by the lessor to the lessee. A lessor must provide and maintain the dwelling in good habitable condition and a lessee is not bound by any contractual condition requiring them to acknowledge that the dwelling is in such a condition or preventing them from asserting otherwise. Other conditions pertain to the cleanliness of the dwelling and its general fitness for habitation. Prior to entering a lease, the prospective lessor must provide the lessee with a copy of any by-laws governing the immovable in question, which are deemed part of the lease. A lease must be made on a form prescribed by the Government for that purpose; and, within 10 days of the lease's commencement, the lessor must give the lessee a copy of the lease. A lease must be written in French but may additionally be written in any other language the parties see fit. Other provisions specific to residential leases provide protections for tenants against discrimination on account of factors such as pregnancy or having children, clauses which impose liquidated damages on tenants in excess of damage actually incurred to landlords, and conduct on the part of the landlord or any third party interfering with the peaceful possession of the immovable by the tenant during the course of the lease. Specific rules also govern the eviction process applicable in a contract of lease.

The rent agreed in relation to a residential dwelling must be specified in the lease and be payable in equal instalments (although the final month's instalment may be less) on the first day of each month or on such other day as the parties agree. The lessor may not require the payment of instalment in excess of one month’s rent and may not exact payment of rent in advance for more than the first payment period or, if that period exceeds one month, payment of more than one month’s rent. Rent may not be adjusted within the first year of a fixed-term lease exceeding 12 months and may not be adjusted during the course of a fixed term lease of a period of 12 months or less.

==== Ontario ====
In Ontario, the Residential Tenancies Act 2006 governs tenancy agreements in the province and prescribes criteria similar to that under the Civil Code of Québec and statutes in other provinces and territories. Under Part V of the act, a landlord may require a tenant to provide a deposit at the commencement of a tenancy provided that it does not exceed the rent payable for one month or one rental period, whichever is greater. A tenancy agreement may not require a tenant to "provide post-dated cheques or other negotiable instruments for payment of rent" or permit automated deductions of rent from a tenant's bank account, credit card, or any other mode of payment. The rent stipulated in a tenancy agreement may not be varied except where at least 12 months have passed since the day of the last rental increase (if applicable) or the commencement of the tenancy (otherwise) and may, subject to limited exceptions, only be varied by the guideline amount prescribed by the appropriate provincial minister. A landlord and tenant may enter into an agreement to permit a rental increase of 3% above the guideline amount if the landlord "has carried out or undertakes to carry out a specified capital expenditure in exchange for the rent increase" or "has provided or undertakes to provide a new or additional service in exchange for the rent increase"; nevertheless, a tenant may rescind such an agreement within five days of signing it by giving notice to the landlord. A landlord may also increase the rent if they agree to provide a parking space or another prescribed amenity to the tenant. Additionally, a landlord may apply for permission to increase the rent by an amount greater than 3% on the grounds of extraordinary capital expenditure or rises in municipal taxes. A tenant may request a landlord for permission to assign their lease or sublet and, while the landlord may refuse permission, they must not refuse permission arbitrarily.

==== British Columbia ====
A residential tenancy agreement in British Columbia is deemed to incorporate the standard terms established by provincial regulations made under the province's Residential Tenancy Act regardless of whether the agreement is in writing. A tenancy agreement may require a deposit of up to half a month's rent and may include a provision prohibiting the consumption or possession of tobacco or cannabis products. A tenant has the right to "quiet enjoyment" including but not limited to reasonable privacy, freedom from unreasonable disturbance, exclusive possession of the rental unit subject only to limited exceptions, and reasonable use of common areas. The rent stipulated in a tenancy agreement may not be varied except where at least 12 months have passed since the day of the last rental increase (if applicable) or the commencement of the tenancy (otherwise), and notice of an increase in rent must be provided at least 3 months in advance in the prescribed form. A landlord may only increase the rent under a tenancy agreement by the amount approved under provincial regulations, agreed to in writing by the tenant, or exceptionally permitted in accordance with regulations.

=== Nominate contracts specific to Québec ===
==== Contracts similar in nature to sale ====
In Québec, the civil code contains special provisions for three types of nominate contracts that are described as being "similar" to contracts of sale. The first of these is the contract of exchange, defined as "a contract by which the parties transfer ownership of property other than money to each other". The code provides that "where one of the parties proves, even after having received the property transferred" to them under a contract of exchange, "that the other party was not the owner of the property", the first party is not obliged to honour their obligation under the contract but instead may be "compelled to return" the property that they unrightfully received. A party who has such property seized from them may seek damages or recover the property that they provided under the contract of exchange. For all other purposes, the code specifies that "the rules pertaining to contracts of sale apply to contracts of exchange".

The second type of contract that falls within this category is a contract of "giving in payment", which is defined as a contract under which a debtor transfers property to a creditor in lieu of "a sum of money or other property" owed to them by the debtor. The general rules prescribed for contracts of sale, including those regarding warranties, apply to contracts of giving in payment. The code also provides that a "clause by which a creditor, with a view to securing the performance of the obligation of his debtor, reserves the right to become the irrevocable owner of the property or to dispose of it" is void.

The third type of contract in this category is "alienation for rent", which is defined as "contract by which the lessor transfers the ownership of an immovable to a lessee in return for a ground rent which the latter obligates himself to pay". Essentially a type of lease that may be employed for residential or commercial property, a lessee under this type of contract "is personally liable to the lessor for the rent", which is not discharged by the property's abandonment or destruction by force majeure but may nevertheless be discharged if the lessee offers "to reimburse the capital value of the rent". Aside from these special provisions, the rules applying to contracts of sale apply equally to alienation for rent.

==== Gift ====
Under Québecois contract law, a gift is "a contract by which a person, the donor, transfers ownership of the property by gratuitous title to another person, the donee". In many regards, gift contracts under Québecois law are comparable to trusts except that the property disposed of by a trust contract under Québecois law constitutes a patrimony by appropriation separate from the patrimony of any individual and is administered by a third-party known as a trustee. As with trusts, a gift contract can be created inter vivos or mortis causa (i.e. by the will of an individual upon their death). The civil code provides for various rules regarding the capacity of persons to make gift contracts, formalities that such contracts must meet, and provisions regarding their validity including the provision that a gift mortis causa is only valid if made as part of a marriage or civil union contract or if it could be held up as a legacy under the law of succession. A gift may be revoked on the ground of ingratitude, "where the donee has behaved in a seriously reprehensible manner towards the donor, having regard to the nature of the gift, the faculties of the parties and the circumstances"; however, an action on this ground must be brought during the lifetime of the donor and within a year after they become aware of the grounds for action.

==== Finance lease of movable property ====
With regard to movable property, a finance lease is defined as "a contract by which a person, the lessor, puts movable property at the disposal of another person, the lessee, for a fixed term and for consideration". A lease of movable property may only take place for commercial purposes and, under such a contract, "the lessor acquires the property that is the subject of the leasing from a third person, at the request and in accordance with the instructions of the lessee." Property that is the subject of a leasing, even if attached or joined to an immovable, retains its movable nature for as long as the contract lasts, provided it does not lose its individuality. A lessor must disclose the finance lease during the act of purchase and the seller owes the warranties prescribed for contracts of sale directly to the lessee The lessee bears responsibility for maintenance and repair of the movable property as well as any risk of loss or damage including by force majeure.

== Remedies ==
Remedies for breach of contract in Canadian law can broadly be divided into three categories: damages (including restitution, compensation, and liquidated damages), specific relief (including specific performance, injunctions, set-off, and netting), and rescission.

=== Damages ===
The most common remedies in Canadian contract law are compensatory and restitutionary damages, which serve to compensate or provide restitution to the party that is not in breach and are determined by the court. In some, but not all, common law provinces and territories, compensatory and restitutionary damages may be determined by jury. Liquidated damages, in contrast, are damages prescribed by the terms of the contract itself. In Québec, the general rules regarding the assessment of damages are specifically laid out in the civil code, which states that "damages due to the creditor compensate for the amount of the loss he has sustained and the profit of which he has been deprived" (providing for compensatory and restitutionary damages). Additionally, the code provides that a penalty or liquidated damages clause may be invoked instead of specific relief or damages under the general rules. Meanwhile, the rules regarding damages in the common law provinces and territories are derived from common law precedent and are largely similar to those in other common law jurisdictions, although the Supreme Court of Canada has gradually interpreted both the Civil Code of Québec and common law rules regarding damages in a manner that converges and reduces disparities between the two.

In general, while liquidated damages provided for by a valid contractual clause have traditionally been recognised in civil law jurisdictions except where manifestly unconscionable, common law jurisdictions have traditionally regarded liquidated damages that are purely punitive as contrary to public policy in cases of breach of contract. However, contemporary jurisprudence in Canadian common law provinces has adopted the civil law position traditionally applied in Québec and recognises penalty clauses as valid and enforceable provided that they are not unconscionable. In the province of New Brunswick, the Law Reform Act provides that a penalty clause is enforceable "to the extent that it is reasonable in all of the circumstances" and that "a court may determine in the circumstances of a case before it that a penalty clause or a liquidated damages clause should be enforced in full, in part or not at all". The Canadian position in both Québec and the common law provinces is similar to the middle-ground approach taken under Philippine contract law, which provides that a penalty clause providing for liquidated damages is enforceable unless either the clause is "iniquitous or unconscionable" or the breach of contract in question is not one that was envisioned by the parties when they concluded the contract.

Article 1226 of the French Civil Code provides for clause pénale, a variant of liquidated damages which combines compensatory and coercive elements. Judges may adjust excessive contract penalties, but such clauses are not generally void as a matter of French law. In Louisiana, which follows a civil law system similar to those of Québec and France, liquidated damages are referred to as "stipulated damages". Prior to 1 January 1985, Louisiana law used the term “penal clause” under former article 2117 of the Civil Code. Stipulated damages create a secondary obligation for the purpose of enforcing the principal obligation. The aggrieved party may demand either the stipulated damages or performance of the principal obligation, but may not demand both except for delay. Stipulated damages may not be modified by the court (and will therefore be enforced) "unless they are so manifestly unreasonable as to be contrary to public policy". Article 420-1 of the Civil Code of Japan provides an even firmer basis to uphold contractual penalties:

1. The parties may agree on the amount of the liquidated damages with respect to the failure to perform the obligation. In such case, the court may not increase or decrease the amount thereof.
2. The liquidated damages shall not preclude the demand for performance or the exercise of the cancellation right.
3. Any penalty is presumed to constitute liquidated damages.

=== Specific relief ===
Where the court determines damages not to provide an adequate remedy for a breach of contract, they may provide for specific performance or an injunction.

In common law provinces, the rules regarding remedies other than damages are derived from equity and are seen as the exception to the general rule that damages are the preferred remedy awarded by courts. Where the court determines damages not to provide an adequate remedy for a breach of contract, they may provide for specific performance or an injunction. Specific performance is an equitable remedy whereby a court directs a party to perform a specific act, such as to complete performance of one or more obligations under the contract. Specific performance is almost never available for contracts of personal service, although performance may also be ensured through the threat of proceedings for contempt of court. In extremely rare circumstances, particularly in connection with a duty of good faith, a court may also issue an injunction prohibiting a party from taking a specific course of action or (in the case of the duty to negotiate in good faith) requiring a party to resume negotiations. Additionally, the remedies of set-off and netting are generally available only in the context of complex financial obligations.

In Québec, provisions surrounding specific relief are generally outlined in section 1590 of the civil code, which provides that "an obligation confers on the creditor the right to demand that the obligation be performed in full, properly and without delay". Where, without adequate justification, a party to a contract fails to perform their obligation; the other party may "force specific performance of the obligation"; set-off, net, or lawfully default on their own obligations; or "take any other measure provided by law". The rules regarding specific performance and set-off/netting are outlined in sections 1601-1603 and sections 1604-1606 respectively, which provide for formalities regarding notice to the defaulting party. The code makes special provisions for a party to seek performance by equivalence in sections 1607-1610. Courts will issue injunctions and orders for specific performance where necessary in order to enable a party to exercise a remedy provided for by the civil code or where it is necessary in the interests of fairness, e.g. where a party has violated a duty of good faith or where a contract is invalid.

In all provinces, the remedy of set-off and netting are available where provided for by a set-off clause or netting agreement in a contract. Such clauses primarily appear in financial investment contracts, particularly in master agreements between large investors. Such agreements typically provide for the obligations of parties to be balanced against such that a party may consider its pecuniary obligations to another party fully or partially discharged by subtracting from them the sum the other party owes to it.

=== Rescission ===
Rescission is a remedy which allows a contractual party to cancel the contract. Parties may rescind a contract if they are the victims of a vitiating factor; either provided by the Civil Code of Québec or, in the common law provinces and territories, by a mixture of precedent and statutory law. Typically, where a party lacked capacity under the law of a province or where a party invokes the applicable rules regarding mistake, unequal bargaining power, misrepresentation, force majeure, or hardship as a vitiating factor. The applicable rules regarding vitiating factor include those derived from provincial law as well as those prescribed by the contract in question.

== Third party beneficiaries ==
In Canada, the ability of a third-party beneficiary (i.e. a person that is not a party to a contract but to whom the contract promises an obligation) to enforce a contractual obligation varies between provinces. Outside Québec and New Brunswick, the doctrine of privity of contract typically applies and can serve to limit or even eliminate the ability of a third-party beneficiary to enforce a contractual obligation, including in instances where they may have suffered pecuniary loss or otherwise been harmed due to the non-performance of a promised obligation. Over time, the Supreme Court of Canada has weakened the doctrine of privity of contract by providing for exceptions where a third-party beneficiary has acted in reliance of such a promise or where it be otherwise unconscionable for the court to deny the third-party beneficiary an adequate remedy.

In Québec; the civil code provides that, while a contract is in general only binding between its parties except where otherwise specified by law, a party to a contract may undertake an obligation toward a third party and such a third party has the right to the performance of the obligation by the promising party. Such an obligation may be revoked unless the third party beneficiary has notified the promising party of their acceptance.

New Brunswick abrogated the doctrine of privity of contract with the Law Reform Act, which provides that:

4(1) "Unless the contract provides otherwise, a person who is not a party to a contract but who is identified by or under the contract as being intended to receive some performance or forbearance under it may enforce that performance or forbearance by a claim for damages or otherwise."

4(2) "In proceedings under subsection (1) against a party to a contract, any defence may be raised that could have been raised in proceedings between the parties."

4(3) "The parties to a contract to which subsection (1) applies may amend or terminate the contract at any time, but if by doing so, they cause loss to a person described in subsection (1) who has incurred expense or undertaken an obligation in the expectation that the contract would be performed, that person may recover the loss from any party to the contract who knew or ought to have known that the expenses would be or had been incurred or that the obligation would be or had been undertaken."

4(4) "For the purposes of subsection (1), a person who is identified by or under a contract as being intended to receive some performance or forbearance under it includes: a) a person who is intended to receive the performance or forbearance only in certain circumstances, if those circumstances occur, and b) a person who is not named in the contract but is a member of a class of persons intended to receive the performance or forbearance."

== Quasi-contracts ==
A quasi-contract, or a contract implied in law, is an obligation or series of obligations arising by operation of law without the mutual intention of the parties. There are two primary categories of quasi-contract: negotiorum gestio or restitution (which are similar but codified separately in the Civil Code of Québec) and unjust enrichment. Quasi contracts serve to remedy circumstances in which it would be inequitable for the courts not to recognise and enforce a moral obligation. Contracts implied in law differ from contracts implied in fact in that contracts implied in law are not true contracts. Contracts implied in fact are ones that the parties involved presumably intended. In contracts implied in law, one party may have been completely unwilling to participate, as shown below, especially for an action in restitution. In other words, quasi-contracts arise where there is no exchange of consent (Québec) or intention to create legal relations (common law provinces and territories) but public policy necessitates a remedy.

=== Unjust enrichment ===
Unjust enrichment, as conceptualised in Canadian contract law, is defined in section 1493 of the Civil Code of Québec which provides that anyone "who is enriched at the expense of another" must compensate the other person "if there is no justification for the enrichment". Section 1494 provides that "justification" exists where it can be shown that the enrichment occurred as a result of "the performance of an obligation", "the failure of the [claimant] to exercise a right", or "an act performed by the [claimant]" at their "own risk and peril or with a consistent liberal intention". The criteria for a plaintiff to bring an action for unjust enrichment in Canada were outlined in Pettkus v. Becker, 1980, which established that a plaintiff seeking to establish a claim for unjust enrichment needs to show: (i) enrichment; (ii) deprivation; (iii) causal connection between enrichment and deprivation; and (iv) absence of juristic justification for the enrichment.

The concepts of deprivation and enrichment are extremely broad. Deprivation refers to any pecuniary loss in the form of contribution where A is enriched if B contributes to the acquisition of assets in A's name. The causal connection between enrichment and deprivation must be "substantial and direct". The absence of justification is satisfied if a plaintiff establishes a reason why the benefit ought not be retained, or if the Defendant demonstrates a convincing argument in favour of retention of the property. Remedy for unjust enrichment is frequently an imposition of constructive trust over the property unjustly retained.

=== Restitution and negotiorum gestio ===
Under certain circumstances, a person can seek compensation for providing services to another person (restitution) or managing the other person's affairs (e.g. taking action to protect an absent neighbour's property from flooding) without the awareness or consent of the other person (negotiorum gestio or necessitous intervention). In Québec, quasi-contractual obligations arising from the former are codified in section 1491 of the civil code, which provides that "payment made in error, or merely to avoid injury to the person making it while protesting that he owes nothing, obliges the person who receives it to make restitution". Similarly, quasi-contractual obligations arising from the latter are provided for by sections 1482-1490 of the civil code, which provide that an individual who spontaneously manages the affairs of another person is entitled to remuneration as though they did so under a contractual obligation (provided that the first person promptly notifies the other person) and that a person who undertakes such management has an obligation to continue acting until either they "can withdraw without risk of loss" or the person in question (or an agent, liquidator, or guardian) is able to provide for it. In the common law provinces and territories, the law of restitution and necessitous intervention are rooted in equity and produce substantially similar effects to the provisions of the civil code. Unawareness and non-consent, depending on the circumstances, may be due to unconsciousness (e.g. in the case of medical assistance provided), absence, or any other factor which made it impracticable to seek that person's consent before reasonably acting in that person's interests.

The elements of an action for restitution at common law are typically:

- the supplier acts "unofficiously", that is, isn't interfering in the affairs of the recipient for no reason;
- the supplier acts with the intent to charge money for doing so;
- the goods or services are necessary to prevent the recipient from suffering serious bodily injury or pain;
- the recipient is unable to consent;
- the supplier has no reason to know that the recipient would not consent if they could; and,
- if the recipient is "extremely" mentally incompetent or young and objects, the non-consent is immaterial.

== Dispute resolution ==
In both Québec and the common law provinces, where no arbitration or mediation clause or agreement applies, a party seeking a remedy for breach of contract is typically required to file a civil lawsuit in the court which has jurisdiction over the contract. Except where the remedy sought is damages below the prescribed amount for a province's small claims court to assume jurisdiction or where the subject-matter of the contract falls within an area of law over which the Federal Court has concurrent or exclusive jurisdiction under an act of Parliament, court cases involving contractual disputes are within the exclusive jurisdiction of provincial superior courts. Questions regarding the validity of choice of law, choice of court, and arbitration clauses are determined with reference to provincial law.

=== Choice of law ===
A choice of law clause designates the law under which a dispute arising under a contract is to be resolved, which may be the law of a Canadian province or territory or of a foreign jurisdiction. In the absence of a valid choice of law clause, the law applicable to each aspect of the contract is generally determined either under the rules pertaining to private international law prescribed by Chapter 10 of the Civil Code of Québec (before the Superior Court of Québec) or under the conflict of laws rules developed by common law as modified by the appropriate provincial legislature (before the superior courts of other provinces). Canadian courts in both Québec and the common law provinces will typically enforce a choice of law clause contained in a contract. The Canadian position for autonomy for choice of law negotiations was established in Vita Food Products Inc. v Unus Shipping Co “the proper law of the contract ‘is the law which parties intended to apply". When a contract dispute arises between parties that are in different jurisdictions, the law that is found applicable to the contract will ultimately dependent on the conflict of laws analysis of the court where the breach of contract action is filed and a choice of law clause will typically not be interpreted as applying the conflict of laws rules of the jurisdiction whose law it selects.

Nevertheless, a choice of law clause may be found unenforceable if it fails to satisfy certain criteria. For the choice of law clause to be enforceable, the choice of law must be bona fide, the contract must be legal, and there must be no reason for avoiding the choice of law on public policy grounds. Federal, provincial, or territorial statutes can inhibit parties' ability to negotiate a choice of law. For example, the Bills of Exchange Act, Canada Shipping Act, and the Insurance Act (Ontario).

In Québec, section 3111 of the civil code provides that a contract is governed by the law expressly designated in its terms or which may be inferred with certainty from its terms. Where no choice of law clause is included or where the contract or a provision thereof would be invalid under the chosen law, section 3112 of the civil code provides that "the law of the State with which the act is most closely connected in view of its nature and the attendant circumstances" is to apply.

=== Choice of court ===
Many contracts contain an exclusive choice of court agreement, setting out the jurisdiction in whose courts disputes in relation to the contract should be litigated. The clause may be general, requiring that any case arising from the contract be filed within a specific jurisdiction, or it may require that a case be filed in a specific court. For example, a choice of court clause may require that a case be filed in a Canadian court, or it may require more specifically that the case be filed in the Court of Queen's Bench in Alberta. Based upon an analysis of the laws, rules of procedure and public policy of the state and court in which the case was filed, a court that is identified by the clause may find that it should not exercise jurisdiction, or a court in a different jurisdiction or venue may find that the litigation may proceed despite the clause. As part of that analysis, a court may examine whether the clause conforms with the formal requirements of the jurisdiction in which the case was filed (in some jurisdictions a choice of forum or choice of venue clause only limits the parties if the word "exclusive" is explicitly included in the clause). Where a contract as a whole is found to be void, a choice of court clause may still be relied upon even when it is part of the case of the person relying upon them that the contract is void. In general, if it determines a choice of court clause to be valid, a court designated by the clause will accept jurisdiction and a court not designated will refuse jurisdiction or direct that the case be transferred to the court designated by the clause.

=== Arbitration ===
Commercial contracts, particularly those between parties located in different provinces or countries, frequently contain arbitration clauses. The enforceability of arbitration clauses in a given province is typically governed by one or more statutes codifying its arbitration rules. Most provinces restrict the enforceability of arbitration clauses in non-commercial settings or where there may be a significant imbalance of bargaining power between the parties to the contract. For instance, Québec does not permit arbitration clauses to be enforced in cases pertaining to "the status and capacity of persons, family matters or other matters of public order" and prohibits provisions which give one party an unfair advantage in the appointment of arbitrators (e.g. in cases of arbitration clauses included in consumer or labour contracts). In Canada, as in most jurisdictions around the world, an arbitration clause can generally be set aside if it is found to conflict with public policy. Many common law provinces maintain separate frameworks for domestic arbitration agreements and international commercial arbitration agreements (e.g. Ontario's Arbitration Act and International Commercial Arbitration Act). In such cases, the latter usually implements the UNCITRAL Model Law on International Commercial Arbitration. Arbitral awards may generally be enforced in the same manner as ordinary court judgments, and are recognised and enforceable internationally under the New York Convention, which has 156 parties. In general, an arbitration agreement contained in a contract is regarded as a separate freestanding contract and where the arbitrators find the contract as a whole to be void, the arbitration agreement is not for that reason rendered void. In general, courts may not interfere with arbitral proceedings or with disputes subject to a valid arbitration clause except in order to: assist the conducting of arbitrations, ensure that arbitrations are conducted in accordance with arbitration agreements, prevent unequal or unfair treatment of parties to arbitration agreements, or enforce awards.

Where an arbitration clause is unconscionable, it may be set aside by a court under the precedent set by the Supreme Court of Canada in Uber Technologies Inc v Heller. In that case, an Uber driver was attempting to bring a class action lawsuit against the company arguing that drivers are employees and therefore entitled to benefits under the Ontarian Employment Standards Act and equivalent legislation in other provinces and territories. However, Uber attempted to invoke an arbitration clause included in its contracts with Canadian drivers which required that all disputes between Uber and the drivers be resolved by arbitration in the Netherlands. In an 8–1 decision, the Supreme Court of Canada held that the arbitration clause in Heller's contract with Uber was unconscionable. Further, the majority held that the contract was void because it attempted to contract out of the Employment Standards Act. As a result, the Court allowed Heller's class action lawsuit against Uber to proceed to trial. Justice Russell Brown, in a concurring opinion, argued that the arbitration clause was unenforceable because it effectively denied Heller access to justice and was therefore contrary to public policy.
