= Hangarter v. Provident =

- Court: United States Court of Appeals for the Ninth Circuit
- Full case name: Hangarter v. Provident Life & Accident Ins. Co.
- Decided: June 25, 2004
- Citation: 373 F.3d 998

Holding
- Affirmed lower court's decision

Court membership
- Judges sitting: Alfred T. Goodwin, A. Wallace Tashima, Richard R. Clifton

Keywords
- Insurance bad faith

Hangarter v. Provident Insurance Company, 373 F.3d 998 (9th Cir. 2004), (UnumProvident, now referred to as Unum or Unum Group), is a landmark decision by the 9th Circuit Court of Appeals on the issue of disability bad faith insurance law. Because California's bad faith insurance law is often referred to in many states as a model nationwide, the 9th Circuit's decision has a persuasive impact throughout the country.

== History ==
After almost ten years as a successful chiropractor, Joan Hangarter purchased an individual disability insurance policy from the Paul Revere Life Insurance Company. The agent explained that even if she could still do paperwork or other work, if Mrs. Hangarter could not work as a chiropractor, the policy would cover her. The policy also provided that after she had been disabled for 90 days, future premiums would be waived while she remained disabled. Several years after purchasing the policy, Mrs. Hangarter suffered from a shoulder injury and cervical disc disease.

Mrs. Hangarter's doctors concluded she was totally disabled, however, Paul Revere disputed the results. After Paul Revere terminated Mrs. Hangarter's benefits, the company attached her bank account for the insurance premiums, until the account was drained, at which point the company cancelled her policy.

Mrs. Hangarter subsequently brought a diversity action against Paul Revere, alleging violation of § 17200 of the Unfair Competition Act, breach of contract, breach of the covenant of good faith and fair dealing, and intentional misrepresentation. Magistrate Judge James Larson presided over the oral arguments by Plaintiff's attorneys Ray Bourhis, Alice Wolfson, David Lilienstein, and Daniel Smith, and Defendants' attorneys Horace Greene and Evan Tager. After eleven days of trial, a jury of six returned a unanimous verdict for Hangarter that awarded over $7.5 million, with $5 million of the verdict made up of a punitive damages award.

== Holding ==
Affirming in part and reversing in part the district court's opinion in Hangarter v. Paul Revere Life Insurance Company, the 9th Circuit ruled the defendant insurance company, UnumProvident, engaged in biased and bad faith claims handling and investigation. This case marked a milestone victory for disabled claimants who were rejected because disability insurers were basing their decisions on an improper definition of total disability. The 9th Circuit made it clear that California law controls the definition of this crucial phrase in disability policies.

Hangarter v. Provident is also a landmark decision in the area of admissibility of expert testimony, under the Daubert factors laid out by the Supreme Court.

With experts on insurance claims practices, the Daubert factors will not preclude the kind of testimony whose reliability depends on the knowledge and experience of the expert, rather than the theory or technical framework behind it.

Hangarter gave several important findings of law that aid disabled claimants. First, futile attempts to return to an occupation are insufficient to reverse a jury's determination of total disability under California law. Total disability may still be found, even if an insured was able to do some work under her occupation. The guiding focus is whether an insured was unable to perform the substantial and material duties of her own occupation in the usual and customary way with reasonable continuity. Second, the 9th Circuit affirmed that recovery under total disability is not precluded because an insured was able to generate income during her disability. Disability insurance is designed not as insurance against loss of income, but as a substitute for earnings when an insured is deprived of the capacity to earn an income. Third, repeated use of a medical examiner overcomes any presumption that an insurance company's denial of a claim is a genuine dispute. The practice of using the same medical examiner when claims are being rejected evinces bad faith on the part of the insurance company.
