= Shadow of the Law =

Shadow of the Law may refer to:

- Shadow of the law, a sociolegal term
- Shadow of the Law (1930 film), an American pre-Code film
- Shadow of the Law (1926 film), an American silent crime drama
