= Bhasin v Hrynew =

2014 Supreme Court of Canada case

- Supreme Court of Canada

Hearing: 12 February 2014 Judgment: 13 November 2014
- Citations: 2014 SCC 71
- Prior history: APPEAL from Bhasin v. Hrynew, 2013 ABCA 98 (18 March 2013), setting aside Bhasin (Bhasin & Associates) v. Hrynew, 2011 ABQB 637 (4 November 2011). Leave to appeal granted, Harish Bhasin, carrying on business as Bhasin & Associates v. Larry Hrynew, et al., 2013 CanLII 53400 (22 August 2013), Supreme Court (Canada)
- Ruling: Appeal allowed in part.

Holding
- The trial judge did not make a reversible error by adjudicating the issue of good faith. Her detailed findings amply support the overall conclusion that C acted dishonestly with B throughout the period leading up to its exercise of the non‑renewal clause in question.

Court membership
- Chief Justice: Beverley McLachlin; Puisne Justices: Louis LeBel, Rosalie Abella, Marshall Rothstein, Thomas Cromwell, Michael Moldaver, Andromache Karakatsanis, Richard Wagner

Reasons given
- Unanimous reasons by: Cromwell J
- Moldaver J took no part in the consideration or decision of the case.

Bhasin v Hrynew, 2014 SCC 71 is a leading Canadian contract law case, concerning good faith as a basic organizing principle in contractual relations in Canada's common law jurisdictions.

== Background ==
In 1989, Harish Bhasin started a small sales business and partnered with Canadian American Financial Corp (Can-Am) (Note: Can-Am was a part of the Allianz group of companies, and changed its corporate name several times between 1989 and 2014. It was known as Heritage Education Funds, Heritage Scholarship Trust Plan. (Note: Bhasin (Bhasin & Associates) v Hrynew, 2011 ABQB 637 at paras 14–15 (4 November 2011))) which sold Registered Education Saving Plans (RESP) through independent enrollment directors under contract. Can-Am's enrollment directors were contractually prohibited from selling other products or accepting any other form of employment. (Note: Bhasin (Bhasin & Associates) v Hrynew, 2011 ABQB 637 at paras 2–3, 78–79 (4 November 2011))

Larry Hrynew was another enrollment director that Can-Am. Can-Am had promised Hrynew that there would be an opportunity for mergers when he signed with the company after leaving another similar agency. (Note: Bhasin (Bhasin & Associates) v Hrynew, 2011 ABQB 637 at para 238 (4 November 2011))

In 1998, Can-Am established a standard form contract for all enrollment directors after consultation with several employees included Bhasin and Larry Hrynew. Bhasin signed the new standard contract for a three-year term with automatic renewal unless six months' notice was given; while Hrynew and some other dealers chose not to sign the agreement and continued to work with Can-Am. (Note: Bhasin (Bhasin & Associates) v Hrynew, 2011 ABQB 637 at paras 6–7 (4 November 2011)) The contract also provided that an enrollment director could not sell their business to an unaffiliated party without the consent of Can-Am. (Note: Bhasin (Bhasin & Associates) v Hrynew, 2011 ABQB 637 at paras 83–84 (4 November 2011)) Hrynew negotiated with Can-Am to force a merger of his business with Bhasin's, but Bhasin refused. (Note: Bhasin (Bhasin & Associates) v Hrynew, 2011 ABQB 637 at paras 238, 247–253 (4 November 2011))

The Alberta Securities Commission (ASC) began investigating Can-Am, and an agreement was made with the ASC to appoint Provincial Trading Officers to review enrollment director compliance with provincial regulations. (Note: Bhasin (Bhasin & Associates) v Hrynew, 2011 ABQB 637 at paras 149–163 (4 November 2011)) Hrynew was appointed to this role with the authority to review confidential business records of other enrollment directors, despite not meeting the requirements of being an employee of Can-Am, and Bhasin objected. (Note: Bhasin (Bhasin & Associates) v Hrynew, 2011 ABQB 637 at paras 185, 189–196 (4 November 2011))

In June 2000, Can-Am concerned about the possibility of the ASC revoking their licence, told the ASC it would restructure its agencies to comply and this involved Bhasin working for Hrynew's agency, but nothing was said to Bhasin. (Note: Bhasin (Bhasin & Associates) v Hrynew, 2011 ABQB 637 at paras 243-246, 256 (4 November 2011)) Can-Am told Bhasin that Hrynew in his auditing role was required to treat information confidentially, and was evasive when Bhasin asked in August 2000 if the merger was a "done deal." Bhasin offered to have an outside provincial trading officer audit his company, but Can-Am refused that offer. Bhasin then refused to allow Hrynew to audit his records. Can-Am threatened to terminate his contract, and in May 2001 gave notice of non-renewal of his contract. When the term expired, Bhasin lost the value of his business and workforce, while his sales agents were poached by Hrynew. (Note: Bhasin v Hrynew, 2014 SCC 71 at paras 12–13) Bhasin claimed that there was a breach of the implied term of good faith.

=== At the Court of Queen's Bench of Alberta ===
At the Court of Queen's Bench of Alberta, Justice Andrea Moen found that it was an implied term of the contract that decisions about whether to renew the contract would be made in good faith. The court held that Can-Am was in breach of the implied term of good faith, (Note: Bhasin (Bhasin & Associates) v Hrynew, 2011 ABQB 637 at para 261 (4 November 2011)) Hrynew had intentionally induced a breach of contract, (Note: Bhasin (Bhasin & Associates) v Hrynew, 2011 ABQB 637 at paras 262–317 (4 November 2011)) and the Hrynew and Can-Am were liable for civil conspiracy. (Note: Bhasin (Bhasin & Associates) v Hrynew, 2011 ABQB 637 at paras 318–333 (4 November 2011)) Bhasin was awarded $380,597 in damages for loss of income and business. (Note: Bhasin (Bhasin & Associates) v Hrynew, 2011 ABQB 637 at para 527 (4 November 2011))

Justice Moen found that Can-Am acted dishonestly with Bhasin in the events leading to the non-renewal of his contract. Can-Am misled Bhasin about its intentions and role in the proposed merger with Hrynew, including that they had already provided the ASC with an updated organization chart reflecting the merger. Can-Am did not disclose that they had coordinated with Hrynew to make his business the main agency in Alberta. Justice Moen noted that if Can-Am had acted honestly, Bhasin would have been able to "governed himself accordingly so as to retain the value in his agency." (Note: Bhasin (Bhasin & Associates) v Hrynew, 2011 ABQB 637 at para 258 (4 November 2011)) (Note: Bhasin v Hrynew, 2014 SCC 71 at para 15)

=== At the Court of Appeal of Alberta ===
In the appeal to the Court of Appeal of Alberta (ABCA), the unanimous panel of Justices Jean Côté, Marina Paperny, and R. Paul Belzil allowed the appeal by Can-Am and Hrynew, and dismissed Bhasin's lawsuit. First, the ABCA noted that the pleadings were insufficient and did not include facts that the decision was based upon, including the determination that Bhasin was wrongfully terminated. (Note: Bhasin v Hrynew, 2013 ABCA 98 at paras 19–20 (18 March 2013)) Second, the trial court erred in implying a term of good faith into the contract, relying on previous jurisprudence providing there "is no duty to perform most contracts in good faith", and the duty of good faith in employment contracts is narrow. (Note: Bhasin v Hrynew, 2013 ABCA 98 at paras 27–35 (18 March 2013)) The ABCA also relied on an entire agreement clause in Bhasin's contract which excluded terms to the agreement which were not expressly included. (Note: Bhasin v Hrynew, 2013 ABCA 98 at para 29 (18 March 2013))

== Judgment of the Supreme Court of Canada ==
Does Canadian common law impose a duty on parties to perform their contractual obligations honestly? And, if so, did either of the respondents breach that duty? I would answer both questions in the affirmative.

—SCC, par. 1

Bhasin appealed the decision of the Court of Appeal of Alberta to the Supreme Court of Canada.

Justice Thomas Cromwell writing for a unanimous Court allowed the appeal against Can-Am and dismissed the appeal against Hrynew. The Court varied the trial judge's assessment of damages, reducing it from $381,000 to $87,000. (Note: Bhasin v Hrynew, 2014 SCC 71 at paras 110–111) Justice Michael Moldaver did not participate in the decision to maintain an odd number of justices, Justice Clément Gascon was not a member of the Court when the case was heard in February 2014.

The Court held that Can-Am was liable for breach of the duty of good faith by misleading Bhasin in the period leading up to exercising the non-renewal clause, both regarding its own intentions and Hrynew's role as the provincial trading officer. This negated honest performance. Can-Am was held liable for damages based on the position Bhasin would have been in if Can-Am had fulfilled its duty, assessing damages at $87,000. However, Hrynew was not liable, as the Court of Appeal had held, because the requirements of inducing breach of contract and civil conspiracy were not made out.

Good faith contractual performance is a general organising principle of contract law, which states a general requirement of justice. It can be given different weight in different situations, but ensures the law is developed in a coherent and principled way. As a sub-category of good faith, there is a duty to act honestly in the performance of contractual obligations, not capriciously and arbitrarily. This accords with the reasonable expectations of commercial parties. A contracting party must have 'appropriate regard' for the other party's legitimate interests, depending on the context and primarily means not undermining those interests in bad faith. This differs to higher fiduciary obligations because it does not require loyalty or putting the other contractual party first. The doctrine is to be developed incrementally with analogy to existing areas where good faith is recognised, but the existing categories are not closed. The principle should be consistent with the weight the common law places on freedom of contracting parties to pursue self-interest: motives of contracting parties should not be scrutinised. However, good faith (like good conscience in equity) operates irrespective of the intentions of the parties and limits freedom of contract, albeit that in some contexts parties should be free to relax the requirements.

== Impact ==
An organizing principle therefore is not a free-standing rule, but rather a standard that underpins and is manifested in more specific legal doctrines and may be given different weight in different situations

—SCC, par. 64

The Court's decision was greatly anticipated, and its impact was recognized immediately. It was agreed that further litigation will be required with respect to the scope and implications of the general organizing principle of good faith and the specific duty of honest contractual performance. In the meantime, there will be practical implications, including more precision in contract drafting, greater care in the exercise of contractual rights, and more diligent communication between parties. The Court did not address the existence of a duty to negotiate in good faith, but the existence of a duty of honest contractual performance will certainly influence the conduct of future negotiations. There has also been debate as to how this will reconcile with the doctrine of utmost good faith, especially with respect to the manner in which termination clauses operate in the area of insurance contracts.

There is general agreement on several points arising from the case:

1. It applies only in the context of the performance of contractual obligations, and not to the negotiation of the contracts themselves.
2. The general organizing principle of good faith must be applied according to the context of the contract in question.
3. The duty of honest performance does not equate to a duty of fiduciary loyalty.
4. The duty of honest performance does not equate to a duty of disclosure.
5. While the court did not rule out the ability of contracting parties to influence the scope of honest performance in a particular context, it did state that a generically worded entire agreement clause would not constitute an indication of the parties' intentions in that regard.

The concept of dealing in good faith already exists under the Civil Code of Quebec, and is seen as being the norm in the United States under its Uniform Commercial Code and other decisions of its state courts.

The decision is also seen as building on earlier common law jurisprudence, (Note: Aleyn v. Belchier (1758) 1 Eden 132, 28 ER 634 (5 July 1758), Carter v. Boehm (1766) 3 Burr 1905, 97 ER 1162 and Mills v Mills [1938] HCA 4, 60 CLR 150 (17 February 1938)) and being in line with developing English case law (Note: "A new era for good faith in English contract law?". Allen & Overy. 5 March 2013., discussing Yam Seng Pte Ltd v International Trade Corporation Ltd [2013] EWHC 111 (QB), [2013] 1 All ER (Comm) 1321 (1 February 2013)) (although there is debate as to that nature and scope). (Note: "Good faith: no general obligation". Ashurst LLP. April 2013., discussing Mid Essex Hospital Services NHS Trust v Compass Group UK and Ireland Ltd (t/a Medirest) [2013] EWCA Civ 200 (15 March 2013))

== See also ==
- Canadian contract law
- English contract law
