= George Leggatt, Lord Leggatt =

British judge (born 1957)

The Right Honourable Lord Leggatt PC
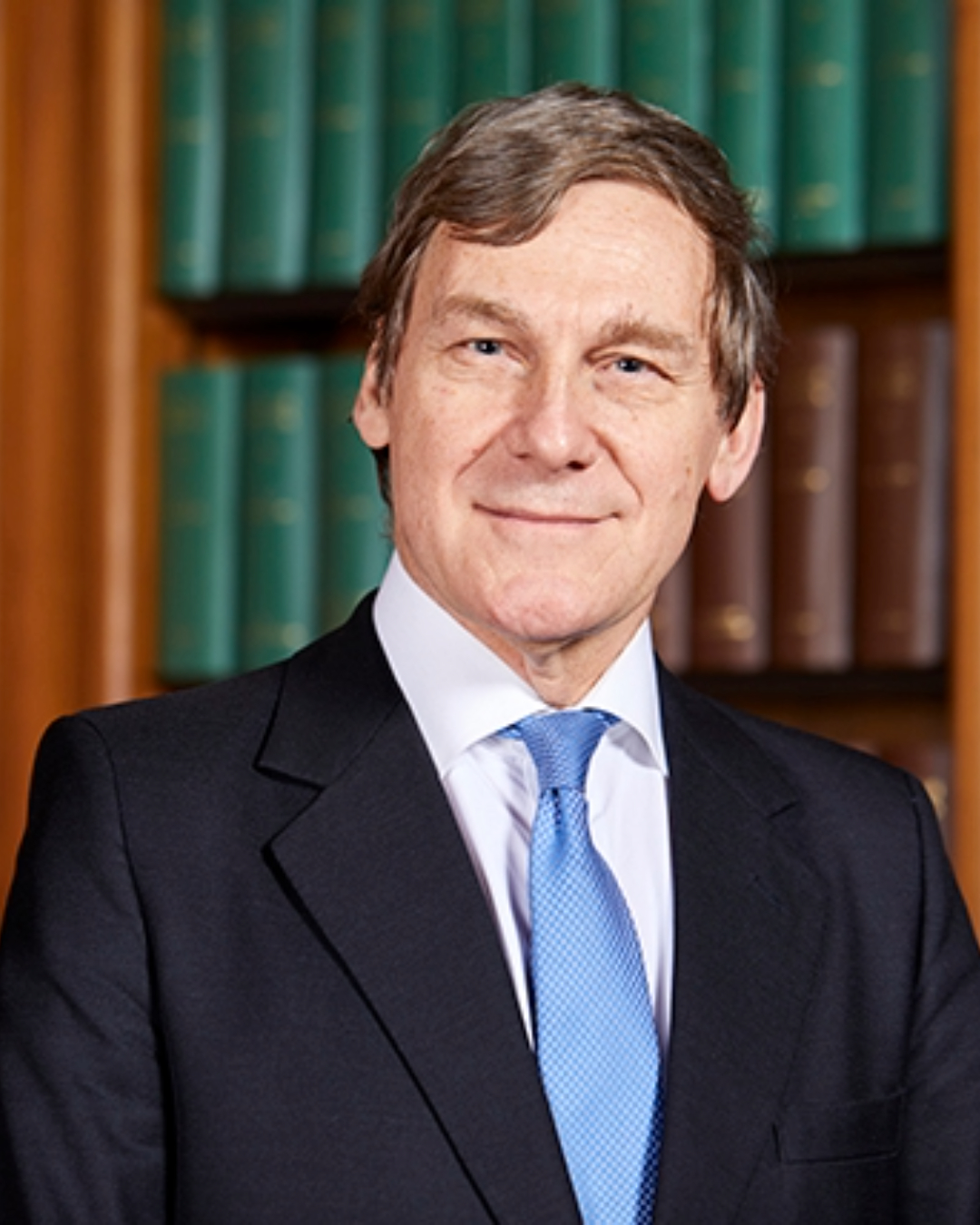

Justice of the Supreme Court of the United Kingdom
- Incumbent
- Assumed office 21 April 2020
- Nominated by: David Gauke
- Appointed by: Elizabeth II
- Preceded by: Lord Carnwath of Notting Hill

Lord Justice of Appeal
- In office February 2018 – 21 April 2020

High Court Judge
- In office 26 October 2012 – February 2018

Personal details
- Born: 12 November 1957 (age 68)
- Education: King's College, Cambridge; Harvard University; University of Chicago Law School

George Andrew Midsomer Leggatt, Lord Leggatt, PC (born 12 November 1957) is a Justice of the Supreme Court of the United Kingdom, the highest court of law in the United Kingdom.

== Education ==
Leggatt's father is the former Lord Justice of Appeal Sir Andrew Leggatt. Leggatt was educated at Eton College and earned a First-Class Bachelor of Arts degree in Philosophy at King's College, Cambridge in 1979. He was a Harkness Fellow at Harvard University (1979–80) and received a Diploma in Law with distinction from City Law School in 1981.

== Legal career ==
Leggatt was called to the bar (Middle Temple) in 1983 and was appointed a Queen's Counsel in 1997. He joined Brick Court Chambers in 1985, where he practised commercial law, including areas such as banking, insurance, sales, and product liability law. He became a recorder in 2002 and was a deputy High Court judge.

On 26 October 2012, he was appointed to the High Court, receiving the customary knighthood in the 2013 Special Honours, and assigned to the Queen's Bench Division. He was appointed as a Lord Justice of Appeal in February 2018.

In July 2019, it was announced Leggatt would become a Justice of the Supreme Court of the United Kingdom after the retirement of Lord Carnwath. He took the judicial courtesy title of Lord Leggatt and was sworn in on 21 April 2020, in a specially adapted ceremony due to the COVID-19 pandemic. Lord Leggatt recited the judicial oath in the presence of The Lord Reed of Allermuir, the President of the Supreme Court, whilst the other Justices watched remotely.

In 2016 Leggatt was elected a Fellow of Eton College.

== Cases ==
- Yam Seng Pte Ltd v International Trade Corp Ltd [2013] EWHC 111 (QB), finding a duty of good faith can be implied in English contract law
- Al Nehayan v Kent [2018] EWHC 333 (Comm), finding that a duty of good faith can be generally implied in law in 'relational' contracts
- Serdar Mohammed v Ministry of Defence [2014] EWHC 1369 (QB), finding the United Kingdom in breach of its obligations under the European Convention on Human Rights, (specifically Article 5). The UK lacks detention authority under international humanitarian law to capture and detain individuals for longer than 96 hours in the course of the non-international armed conflict in Afghanistan.
- Fearn and others v Board of Trustees of the Tate Gallery (2023) UKSC 4, finding that the Tate Gallery's viewing platform was not an ordinary use of land, and hence constituted a private nuisance in overlooking the claimant's residences.
- Philipp v Barclays Bank UK PLC [2023] UKSC 25, finding that banks do not have a duty to prevent their customers from making payments to fraudsters unless the bank knows of facts which should alert it to the fraud.
- Paul and another v Royal Wolverhampton NHS Trust [2024] UKSC 1, finding that psychiatric harm is treated no differently from physical harm in the Law of Torts. Also that doctors do not owe a duty of care to members of the family of their patients to prevent them from harm caused by negligent treatment of the patient.
