= Duty of honest contractual performance =

The duty of honest contractual performance is a contractual duty and implied term of a contract, introduced into Canadian law in 2014 as a result of the decision of the Supreme Court of Canada in the case of Bhasin v. Hrynew.

As a sub-category of good faith and a duty arising at common law, contracting parties have a duty to act honestly in the performance of their contractual obligations. The Court recognised, in passing this judgement, that a new common law duty was being created:

It is appropriate to recognize a new common law duty that applies to all contracts as a manifestation of the general organizing principle of good faith: a duty of honest performance, which requires the parties to be honest with each other in relation to the performance of their contractual obligations.

The Court further stated:

Recognizing a duty of honest performance flowing directly from the common law organizing principle of good faith is a modest, incremental step. This new duty of honest performance is a general doctrine of contract law that imposes as a contractual duty a minimum standard of honesty in contractual performance. It operates irrespective of the intentions of the parties, and is to this extent analogous to equitable doctrines which impose limits on the freedom of contract, such as the doctrine of unconscionability. However, the precise content of honest performance will vary with context ...

Parties may not contract out of this duty.
