= Robert Harris Mnookin =

American lawyer, author and professor

Robert H. Mnookin
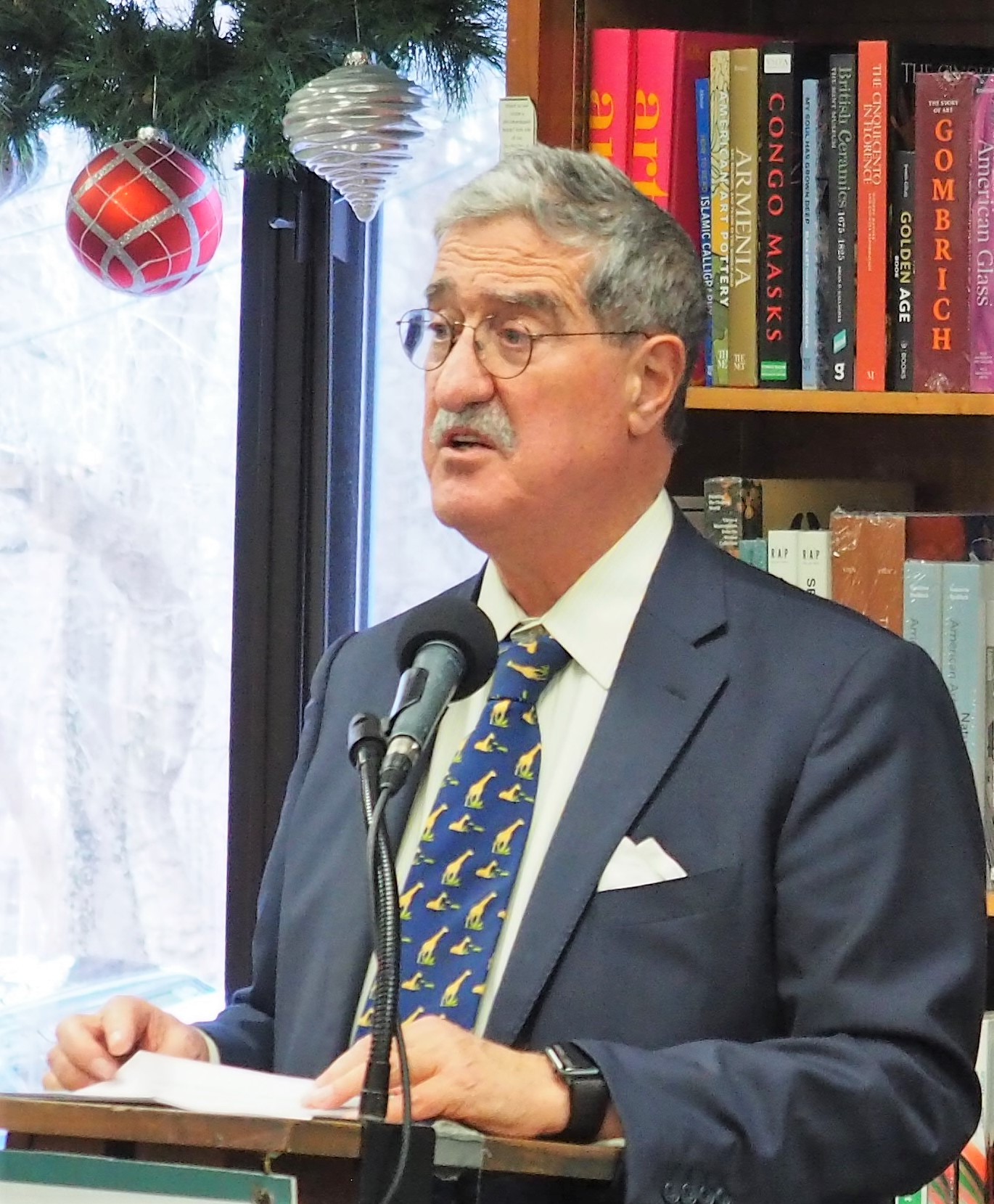
- Born: Kansas City, Missouri, U.S.
- Occupations: Williston Professor of Law, Harvard Law School
- Spouse: Dale Seigel (m. 1963)
- Children: Allison Mnookin and Jennifer Mnookin

Academic background
- Education: Harvard University (BA, LLB)

Academic work
- Discipline: Family law; Dispute resolution; Negotiation; Arbitration
- Notable works: Bargaining with the Devil; Beyond Winning "Bargaining in the Shadow of the Law"
- Website: http://www.mnookin.com/

Robert Harris Mnookin is an American lawyer, author, and the Samuel Williston Professor of Law at Harvard Law School. He focuses largely on dispute resolution, negotiation, and arbitration and was one of the primary co-arbitrators that resolved a 7-year software rights dispute between IBM and Fujitsu in the 1980s. Mnookin has been the Chair of the Program on Negotiation at Harvard Law School since 1994.

== Early life and education ==
Mnookin was born and grew up in Kansas City, Missouri. He graduated from Pembroke-Country Day School in 1960 and from Harvard College in 1964 with an A.B. in economics, magna cum laude. After earning his bachelor's degree, he studied for a year as a Fulbright Scholar at the Econometric Institute in Rotterdam. Upon returning to the U.S., he attended Harvard Law School. Mnookin graduated with his LL.B. in 1968, magna cum laude.

== Career ==
Mnookin clerked for federal D.C. Circuit judge Carl McGowan and then Supreme Court Justice, John Marshall Harlan, in 1969 and 1970. He worked at a San Francisco law firm between 1970 and 1972 before joining the law faculty at the University of California, Berkeley and becoming the first director of the Childhood and Government Project of the Earl Warren Legal Institute. At Berkeley, his researching and writing concerned family law, foster care, child custody, and other children's rights topics. He was also involved in drafting legislation to reform California's foster care system.

Mnookin's first book, Child, Family, and State, was released in 1978. In 1979, Mnookin penned an article entitled "Bargaining in the Shadow of the Law: The Case of Divorce" which appeared in the Yale Law Journal. A 2012 study determined that as of that year, it was the nineteenth most-cited law review article of all time.

In 1981, Mnookin joined the Stanford Law School faculty. In 1987, he became the first Adelbert H. Sweet Professor of Law at Stanford. The following year, he became the director of the new Stanford Center on Conflict and Negotiation which he established with Stanford professors Kenneth Arrow, Lee Ross, Amos Tversky and Robert Wilson. Together they explored and wrote about barriers to the negotiated resolution of conflict. With developmental psychologist and fellow Stanford professor, Eleanor Maccoby, Mnookin conducted a longitudinal study that traced how 1000 divorcing families resolved custody issues in the midst of divorce.

After serving as a visiting professor for the 1990–91 academic year Mnookin joined the Harvard Law School faculty permanently in 1993 where he is the Samuel Williston Professor of Law, the Chair of the Program on Negotiation, and the Director of the Harvard Negotiation Research Project.

Over the course of his career, Mnookin has served as a neutral arbitrator or mediator in a number of complex commercial disputes. Along with co-arbitrator, John L. Jones, Mnookin helped resolve a software rights dispute between IBM and Fujitsu in 1987. Mnookin has also facilitated a number of confidential meetings related to the Israeli-Palestinian conflict and has written about Belgium's ethnic conflict between the Flemish and Walloon populations. Mnookin has also been a Fellow at the Center for Advanced Study in the Behavioral Sciences at Stanford University and is a member of the American Academy of Arts and Sciences.

== Selected publications ==
=== Books ===
- The Jewish American Paradox: Embracing Choice in a Changing World (2018, Public Affairs)
- Bargaining with the Devil: When to Negotiate, When to Fight (2010, Simon & Schuster)
- Beyond Winning: Negotiating To Create Value in Deals and Disputes with Scott R. Peppet and Andrew S. Tulumello (2000, Harvard University Press)
- Dividing The Child: Social and Legal Dilemmas of Custody with Eleanor Maccoby (1992, Harvard University Press)
- In the Interest of Children: Advocacy, Law Reform & Public Policy (1985, W. H. Freeman and Company)

=== Journal articles ===
- "Persistent Nonviolent Conflict with No Reconciliation: The Flemish and Walloons in Belgium," (with A. Verbeke) Duke University Journal of Law and Contemporary Problems, Volume 72, Issue 2 (Spring 2009).
- "The Internal Israeli Conflict: The Past, Present and Future of the Jewish West Bank/Gaza Settlements," (Special Ed.) Negotiation Journal, Volume 21, Number 2, April (2005).
- "Afghanistan: Negotiating in the Face of Terrorism," Conflict Resolution International Quarterly, Volume 19, Number 4 (2002).
- "Why Negotiations Fail: An Exploration of Barriers to the Resolution of Conflict," Ohio State Journal on Dispute Resolution, Volume 235 No. 2 (1993).
- "Creating Value Through Process Design: The IBM - Fujitsu Arbitration," Journal of International Arbitration, (September 1992).
- "Bargaining in the Shadow of the Law: The Case of Divorce" (with L. Kornhauser), Yale Law Journal, Volume 88, Number 5 (April 1979).

== Personal life ==
In 1963, Mnookin married Dale Seigel. The couple has two daughters: Jennifer Mnookin, the President of Columbia University, and Allison, formerly a vice president and General Manager at Intuit.
