= R v Ron Engineering and Construction (Eastern) Ltd =

- Supreme Court of Canada

Hearing: 1980-11-13 Judgment: 1981-01-27
- Full case name: Her Majesty The Queen in right of Ontario and the Water Resources Commission v Ron Engineering & Construction (Eastern) Limited
- Citations: 1981 CanLII 17 (SCC), [1981] 1 SCR 111
- Prior history: APPEAL from a judgment of the Court of Appeal for Ontario, (1979) 24 O.R. (2d) 332; (1979) 98 D.L.R. (3d) 548, reversing the judgment of Holland J.
- Ruling: Appeal allowed.

Court membership
- Chief Justice: Bora Laskin; Puisne Justices: Ronald Martland, Roland Ritchie, Brian Dickson, Jean Beetz, Willard Estey, William McIntyre, Julien Chouinard, Antonio Lamer

Reasons given
- Unanimous reasons by: Estey J.

R v Ron Engineering and Construction (Eastern) Ltd, of 1981 is the leading Supreme Court of Canada decision on the law of tendering for contracts. The case concerned the issue of whether the acceptance of a call for tenders for a construction job could constitute a binding contract. The Court held that indeed in many cases the submission of an offer in response to a call for tenders constitutes a contract separate from the eventual contract for the construction. With the release of the decision, the tendering process practiced in Canada was fundamentally changed.

== Background ==
A call for tenders was sent out requiring a deposit of $150,000 which would be lost if the tendered offer was withdrawn. Ron Engineering submitted an offer along with the required deposit in the form of a certified cheque. The submitted tenders were opened by the owner and Ron Engineering was the low bidder by a substantial margin. It was then discovered that the price on the tender documents was far lower than the price that Ron Engineering had intended to submit, and that they had made a mistake in calculating their total bid price. They informed the owner of the mistake and tried to have the offer changed. The change was refused, the contract was given to another company, and the owner kept Ron Engineering's bid deposit. Ron Engineering sued to get their deposit back. The owner counter-claimed for costs incurred as a result of having to go with a different bidder. At trial the counter-claim was dismissed but it was held that the owner was entitled to keep the deposit. The Ontario Court of Appeal reversed the trial decision and held, relying on the contractual doctrine of mistake, that Ron Engineering was entitled to get its deposit back. The owner appealed to the Supreme Court of Canada.

== Decision ==
The Supreme Court held that the tender process involved two contracts:

- Contract A - a unilateral contract arising automatically upon the submission of a tender, and
- Contract B - the contract awarded upon the tender's acceptance.

The principal term of contract A was the irrevocability of the bid and the corollary term was the obligation in both parties to enter into a construction contract, contract B, upon the acceptance of the tender. The deposit was required to ensure the performance by the contractor-tenderer of its obligations under contract A. It is not correct to say that when a mistake was proven after the tenders were opened by the production of reasonable evidence, the person to whom the tender was made could neither accept the tender nor forfeit the deposit. The test was to be imposed when the tender was submitted, not at a later date, and at that time the rights of the parties under contract A crystallized, at least in circumstances where the tender was capable of acceptance in law.

There was no question of mistake on the part of either party before the moment when contract A came into existence. The tender, despite its being the product of a mistaken calculation, could be subject to the terms and conditions of contract A so as to invoke forfeiture of the deposit. There was no error in the sense that the contractor did not intend to submit the tender in its form and substance. Then, too, there was no principle in law under which the tender was rendered incapable of acceptance by the appellant. No mistake existed which impeded the coming into being of contract A. The effect of a mistake upon the formation, enforceability or interpretation of a subsequent construction contract need not be considered in this case.

The issue did not concern the law of mistake but the application of the forfeiture provisions contained in the tender documents. The deposit was recoverable by the contractor under certain conditions, none of which was met, and also was subject to forfeiture under another term of the contract, the conditions of which had been met. The omission by the owner to insert the number of weeks specified by the tender in the appropriate blank in the contract had no bearing on the rights of the parties to the appeal and did not stand in the way of the owner's asserting its right to retain the deposit.

== Aftermath ==
Tendering was the focus of five further decisions of the Supreme Court made up to 2006. Subsequent to Ron Engineering, judgments have come down in:

- M.J.B. Enterprises Ltd. v Defence Construction (1951) Ltd. (on the use of exclusion clauses in tenders),
- Martel Building Ltd. v Canada (rejecting the existence of a tort of negligence in the conduct of commercial negotiations),
- Naylor Group Inc. v Ellis-Don Construction Ltd. (on the formation of tender contracts between general contracts and subcontractors),
- Double N Earthmovers Ltd. v Edmonton (City) (on the issue of compliance with the terms of a call for tenders), and
- Tercon Contractors Ltd. v. British Columbia (Transportation and Highways) (clarifying the distinctions between a request for proposal and a tender).
