= Contract A and Contract B =

Concepts in Canadian contract law

The terms Contract A and Contract B in Canadian contract law refer to a concept applied by the Canadian courts regarding the fair and equal treatment of bidders in a contract tendering process, for example to award a construction contract. Essentially this concept formalizes previously applied precedents and strengthens the protection afforded to those who submit bids in the tendering process. The concept was introduced in 1981 by the Supreme Court of Canada, in R. v. Ron Engineering and Construction (Eastern) Ltd. The court found that a "duty of fairness" was owed to all bidders by an owner in a tendering process.

Supreme Court of Canada building in Ottawa

A Contract A, a "process contract", is formed between the owner (person, company or organization tendering the project) and each bidder when a "request for proposal" is responded to in the form of a compliant bid, sometimes also known as submission of price. The owner must deal fairly and equally with all bidders, and must not show any favouritism or prejudice towards any bidder(s). In essence, this concept boils down to the right of an individual to have equal opportunity to be successful with their bid for work.

A Contract B is formed when an owner formally accepts a bid or, colloquially, a submission of price. Only a single Contract B is formed between, the owner and the successful bidder. The term Contract B is used to differentiate the actual construction contract from the tender contract or Contract A. Tied to the concept of Contract A, Contract B is a place holder in the concept, a marker at the end of a formalized process of equitable treatment of both bidders and owners.

A breach of Contract A may occur if the owner (or an owner's officer or representative, see vicarious liability), provides information, changes specification during the tendering process to unfairly benefit a particular bidder, enters into closed negotiations with an individual bidder in an effort to obtain more desirable contract conditions, etc. The most common situation in which an owner is accused of having breached Contract A occurs when a bidder is selected who is not the lowest bidder. This contravenes established custom and practice, which would normally dictate that the lowest bidder be awarded the subsequent contract to perform the work, Contract B, but is not normally a source of a breach if handled properly. The successful suits for breach typically occur if the lowest bidder has been excluded based on a stipulation not clearly outlined in the tender documents (such as preference for local bidders) or when the Privilege Clause employed by the owner to exclude a principle of custom and practice is judged by the courts to be too broadly worded to have any meaning.

Justice Ian Binnie noted in 2001 that 20 years had elapsed since the adoption of the concept in Canadian law, observing that "the Contract A/Contract B approach rests on ordinary principles of contract formation".

Process contracts also affect tendering law in other jurisdictions: see Invitation to tender#Process contracts.

== See also ==
- Call for bids
- Request for Proposal
- Reverse auction
