= Insurance bad faith =

Legal concept

Insurance bad faith is a tort unique to the law of the United States (but with parallels elsewhere, particularly Canada) that an insurance company commits by violating the "implied covenant of good faith and fair dealing" which automatically exists by operation of law in every insurance contract. If an insurance company violates the implied covenant, the insured person (or "policyholder") may sue the company on a tort claim in addition to a standard breach of contract claim. The contract-tort distinction is significant because as a matter of public policy, punitive or exemplary damages are unavailable for contract claims, but are available for tort claims. In addition, consequential damages for breach of contract are traditionally subject to certain constraints not applicable to compensatory damages in tort actions (see Hadley v. Baxendale). The result is that a plaintiff in an insurance bad faith case may be able to recover an amount larger than the original face value of the policy, if the insurance company's conduct was particularly egregious.

== Historical background ==
Most laws regulating the insurance industry in the United States are state-specific. In 1869, the Supreme Court of the United States held, in Paul v. Virginia (1869), that the United States Congress did not have the authority to regulate insurance under its power to regulate commerce.

In the 1930s and 1940s, a number of U.S. Supreme Court decisions broadened the interpretation of the Commerce Clause in various ways, which led the U.S. Supreme Court to hold that federal jurisdiction over interstate commerce did extend to insurance in United States v. South-Eastern Underwriters Ass'n (1944). In March 1945, the United States Congress expressly reaffirmed its support for state-based insurance regulation by passing the McCarran–Ferguson Act which held that no law that Congress passed should be construed to invalidate, impair or supersede any law enacted by a state regarding insurance. As a result, nearly all regulation of insurance continues to take place at the state level.

Such regulation generally comes in two forms. First, each state has an "insurance code" or some similarly named statute which attempts to provide comprehensive regulation of the insurance industry and of insurance policies, a specialized type of contract. State insurance codes generally mandate specific procedural requirements for starting, financing, operating, and winding down insurance companies, and often require insurers to be overcapitalized (relative to other companies in the larger financial services sector) to ensure that they have enough funds to pay claims if the state is hit by multiple natural and man-made disasters at the same time. There is usually a department of insurance or division of insurance responsible for implementing the state insurance code and enforcing its provisions in administrative proceedings against insurers.

Second, judicial interpretation of insurance contracts in disputes between policyholders and insurers takes place in the context of the aforementioned insurance-specific statutes as well as general contract law; the latter still exists only in the form of judge-made case law in most states. A few states like California and Georgia have gone farther and attempted to codify all of their contract law (not just insurance law) into statutory law.

Early insurance contracts were considered to be contracts like any other, but first English (see Uberrima fides), and then American, courts recognized that insurers occupy a special role in society by virtue of their express or implied promise of peace of mind, as well as the severe vulnerability of insureds at the time they actually make claims (usually after a terrible loss or disaster). The key point of divergence between the United States and England on this issue is that unlike American courts, English courts have consistently refused to go further and broadly extend the duty of utmost good faith from the pre-contract period into the post-contract period.

In turn, the development of the modern American cause of action for insurance bad faith can be traced to a landmark decision of the Supreme Court of California in 1958: Comunale v. Traders & General Ins. Co. Comunale was in the context of third-party liability insurance, but California later expanded the same rule in 1973 to first-party fire insurance in another landmark decision, Gruenberg v. Aetna Ins. Co.

During the 1970s, insurers argued that these early cases should be read as holding that it was bad faith to deny a claim only when the insurer already knew that it had no reasonable basis for denying the claim (i.e., when the insurer had already acquired information showing a potentially covered claim and denied it anyway). In other words, they contended that intentional mistreatment of an insured should be actionable in bad faith, but not claims handling which at most was grossly negligent. In 1979, California's highest court refuted that argument and further expanded the scope of the tort by holding that inadequate investigation of a claim was actionable in tort as a breach of the implied covenant of good faith and fair dealing.

Other state courts began to follow California's lead and held that a tort claim exists for policyholders that can establish bad faith on the part of insurance carriers. By 2012, at least 46 states had recognized third-party bad faith as an independent tort, and at least 31 states had recognized first-party bad faith as an independent tort. A few states like New Jersey and Pennsylvania declined to allow tort claims for first-party insurance bad faith and instead allowed policyholders to recover broader damages for breach of contract against first-party insurers, including punitive damages.

== Bad faith defined ==
An insurance company has many duties to its policyholders. The kinds of applicable duties vary depending upon whether the claim is considered to be "first party" or "third party". Bad faith can occur in either situation—by improperly refusing to defend a lawsuit or by improperly refusing to pay a judgment or settlement of a covered lawsuit.

Bad faith is a fluid concept and is defined primarily by court decisions in case law. Examples of bad faith include undue delay in handling claims, inadequate investigation, refusal to defend a lawsuit, threats against an insured, refusing to make a reasonable settlement offer, failing to inform the insured of a settlement offer, or adopting an unreasonable interpretation of the insurance policy. A majority of states require intentional wrongdoing by the insurer. A minority of states allow negligence to serve as a predicate for bad faith liability.

=== First party ===
A common first party context is when an insurance company writes insurance on property that becomes damaged, such as a house or an automobile. In that case, the company is required to investigate the damage, determine whether the damage is covered, and pay the proper value for the damaged property. Bad faith in first party contexts often involves the insurance carrier's improper investigation and valuation of the damaged property (or its refusal to even acknowledge the claim at all). Bad faith can also arise in the context of first party coverage for personal injury such as health or life insurance, but those cases tend to be rare. Most of them are preempted by ERISA.

=== Third party ===
Third party situations (essentially, liability insurance) break down into at least two distinct duties, both of which must be fulfilled in good faith. First, the insurance carrier usually has a duty to defend a claim (or lawsuit) even if some or most of the lawsuit is not covered by the insurance policy. Unless the policy is expressly structured so that defense costs "eat away" at the policy limits (a so-called "self-consuming", "wasting" or "burning limits" policy), the default rule is that the insurer must cover all defense costs regardless of the actual limit of coverage. In one of the most famous decisions of his career (involving Jerry Buss's bad faith lawsuit against Transamerica), Justice Stanley Mosk wrote:

[W]e can, and do, justify the insurer's duty to defend the entire 'mixed' action prophylactically, as an obligation imposed by law in support of the policy. To defend meaningfully, the insurer must defend immediately. To defend immediately, it must defend entirely. It cannot parse the claims, dividing those that are at least potentially covered from those that are not.

Texas and a few other conservative states follow an "eight-corners rule" under which the duty to defend is strictly governed by the "eight corners" of two documents: the complaint against the insured and the insurance policy. In many other states, including California and New York, the duty to defend is ascertained by also looking to all facts known to the insurer from any source; if those facts when read together with the complaint show that at least one claim is potentially covered (that is, the complaint actually alleges a claim of the kind which the insurer promised to defend or could be so amended in light of the known facts), the duty to defend is thereby triggered and the insurer must undertake the defense of its insured. This powerful bias in favor of finding coverage is one of the major innovations of U.S. law. Other common law jurisdictions outside of the U.S. continue to construe coverage much more narrowly.

Next, the insurer has a duty of indemnification, which is the duty to pay a judgment entered against the policyholder, up to the limit of coverage. However, unlike the duty to defend, the duty to indemnify exists only to the extent that the final judgment is for a covered act or omission, since by that point, there should be a clear factual record from trial or summary judgment in the plaintiff's favor revealing what portions of the plaintiff's claims are actually covered by the policy (as distinguished from potentially covered). Therefore, most insurance companies exercise a great deal of control over litigation.

In some jurisdictions, like California, third party coverage also contains a third duty, the duty to settle a reasonably clear claim against the policyholder within policy limits, in order to avoid the risk that the policyholder may be hit with a judgment in excess of the value of the policy (which a plaintiff might then attempt to satisfy by writ of execution on the policyholder's assets). If the insurer breaches in bad faith its duties to defend, indemnify, and settle, it may be liable for the entire amount of any judgment obtained by a plaintiff against the policyholder, even if that amount is in excess of policy limits. This was the actual holding of the landmark Comunale case.

== Litigation ==
U.S. courts usually follow the American rule in which parties bear their own attorney's fees in the absence of statute or contract, which means that in most states, bad faith litigation must be financed solely by the plaintiff, either out-of-pocket or through a contingent fee arrangement. (Insurance policies in the U.S. generally lack fee-shifting clauses, so that insurers can consistently invoke the default "bear your own fees" American rule.) However, in California, the plaintiff who prevails on a tort claim in a bad faith action may be able to recover part of its attorneys' fees separately and in addition to the judgment for damages against a defendant insurer, but only up to the extent that those fees were incurred in recovering contractual damages (that is, for breach of the terms of the insurance policy), as opposed to tort damages (for breach of the implied covenant). The allocation of attorneys' fees between those two categories is itself a question of fact (meaning it usually goes to the jury).

=== Assignment or direct action ===
In some states, bad faith is even more complicated because under certain circumstances, a liability insurer may ultimately find itself in a trial where it is being sued directly by the plaintiff who originally sued its insured. This is allowed through two situations: assignment or direct action.

The first situation is where an insured abandoned in bad faith by its liability insurer makes a special settlement agreement with the plaintiff. Sometimes this occurs after trial, where the insured has attempted to defend himself or herself by paying for a lawyer out of pocket, but went to verdict and lost (the actual situation in the landmark Comunale case); other times it occurs before trial and the parties agree to put on an uncontested show trial that results in a final verdict and judgment against the insured. Either way, the plaintiff agrees to not actually execute on the final judgment against the insured in exchange for an assignment of the assignable components of the insured's causes of action against its insurer. In some states, these agreements are named after the state's landmark case that adopted the Comunale doctrine (either directly or from one of its progeny). For example, in Arizona, they are known as Damron agreements.

The second situation is where the plaintiff does not need to obtain a judgment first, but instead proceeds directly against the insured's insurer under a state statute authorizing such a "direct action." These statutes have been upheld as constitutional by the U.S. Supreme Court. The broadest forms of direct action statutes are found in only four American jurisdictions: the states of Louisiana and Wisconsin, and the federal territories of Guam and Puerto Rico.

=== Damages ===
In many states, either the common law tort or an equivalent statute authorizes punitive damages for bad faith to further incentivize insurers to act in good faith towards their insureds.

Bad faith lawsuits may result in large awards of punitive damages. A famous example is State Farm Mutual Auto. Ins. Co. v. Campbell, in which the U.S. Supreme Court overturned a jury verdict of $145 million in punitive damages against State Farm. Bad faith cases may also be slow, at least in the third party context, because they are necessarily dependent upon the outcome of any underlying litigation. For example, the 2003 Campbell decision involved State Farm's handling of litigation resulting from a fatal car accident in 1981, 22 years earlier.

Another important feature of Campbell is that it powerfully illustrates how an insurer cannot avoid tort liability for bad faith by belatedly attempting to cure its breach of contract. In other words, tort liability (including the entitlement to compensatory and punitive damages) irrevocably accrues when the tort is committed, and remains contingent only in the sense that the insured still has the burden of proving that fact before a finder of fact. Thus, State Farm's belated payment of the full judgment against its insured (including amounts in excess of its policy limits) did not prevent the Utah Supreme Court from still holding it liable (after the U.S. Supreme Court reversed the original judgment) for $9 million in punitive damages.

Toxic mold is a common cause of bad faith lawsuits, with about half of the 10,000 toxic mold cases in 2001 being filed against insurance companies on bad faith grounds. Before 2000 the claims were uncommon, with relatively low payouts. One notable lawsuit occurred when a Texas jury awarded $32 million (later reduced to $4 million). In 2002 a suit was settled for $7.2 million.

== Impact ==
In theory, the availability of a tort claim for insurance bad faith should increase insureds' bargaining power vis-à-vis insurers, as they negotiate over claims in the shadow of the law. In turn, this should result in higher recoveries on claims by influencing claims adjusters to err in favor of insureds in close cases, rather than risk having their reasoning dissected on cross-examination by insurance recovery attorneys in jury trials. A 2014 statistical study based on data from 1977, 1987, and 1997 nationwide surveys of U.S. automobile injury claims by the Insurance Research Council was able to identify such an effect. The study focused on first-party claims by drivers against the uninsured/underinsured motorist insurance coverage (UI/UIM) in their own insurance policies, and compared outcomes between states which did and did not allow first-party bad faith claims in those timeframes. The researchers found that "tort liability for insurer bad faith is associated with 10-11 percent higher UM settlements ... an increase that is both statistically and economically significant".

Conversely, defense attorneys argue that attaching massive tort liability to grossly incompetent claims handling incentivizes plaintiffs' attorneys to try too hard to show that insurers are the unreasonable ones: the so-called "bad faith setup". Plaintiffs' counsel may make immediate demands for policy limits with unreasonable time limits and without any opportunity for investigation or discovery, or back out of settlement agreements before they can be finalized on pretexts which they blame upon insurers. In 1985, Justice Otto Kaus of the California Supreme Court warned: "It seems to me that attorneys who handle policy claims against insurance companies are no longer interested in collecting on those claims, but spend their wits and energies trying to maneuver the insurers into committing acts which the insureds can later trot out as evidence of bad faith."

== International comparison ==
No other common law jurisdiction has gone as far as the United States in recognizing a separate tort based on an insurer's bad faith treatment of an insured, although Canada has come quite close. Outside of those two jurisdictions, insurers have much more power to delay and deny claims, safe in the knowledge that their liability is limited to breach of contract damages (i.e., policy limits) and they cannot be compelled to compensate insureds for damages arising from bad faith claims handling.

In 2002, the Supreme Court of Canada upheld an award of punitive damages for an insurer's bad faith claims handling, but expressly refused to recognize insurance bad faith as an independent tort under Ontario law, and instead held that when extremely egregious, an insurer's breach of contract becomes an "actionable wrong" (something different than a tort) which justifies punitive damages. Since then, one Canadian appellate court, the Court of Appeal of New Brunswick, has gone farther and expressly embraced the American concept of a tort of insurance bad faith.

New Zealand's highest court in 1998 refused to decide the issue of whether to impose extracontractual tort liability for bad faith claims handling.

The United Kingdom has refused to adopt the tort of insurance bad faith, and has also refused to impose broader consequential damages for bad faith claims handling.

The Australian Law Reform Commission considered but declined to adopt a tort of insurance bad faith when it drafted the Insurance Contracts Act 1984. Since then, Australian courts have consistently refused to judicially impose what Parliament did not legislatively impose, of which the most recent example was when the New South Wales Court of Appeal refused to adopt insurance bad faith in 2007.

== See also ==
- Bad faith
- Implied covenant of good faith and fair dealing
