= Patrimony of affectation =

Type of civil law legal estate

In certain civil law jurisdictions (e.g., France, Quebec, Mexico, etc.), the patrimoine d'affectation is property, assets, or a legal estate that can be divided for a fiduciary purpose, as being distinct from a person's general assets. It is similar in some respects to the way under common law property is held, managed, or invested in trust by a trustee for the benefit of third parties (beneficiaries). The affected property remains outside the grantor's assets; therefore, even if the grantor goes bankrupt, becomes insolvent, or incurs liabilities, the property remains untouchable and may continue to benefit the intended beneficiaries.

Originally proposed as a way of explaining the common law trust, the concept was first put forward by the French jurist Pierre Lepaulle who based it on the German Zweckvermögen.
