= Tercon Contractors Ltd. v. British Columbia (Transportation and Highways) =

2010 Supreme Court of Canada case

Tercon Contractors Ltd. v. British Columbia (Transportation and Highways) is a British Columbia legal case which was resolved in the Supreme Court of Canada in 2010 on a majority decision, both the majority and the dissenting Justices agreeing that the legal doctrine of fundamental breach should be "laid to rest", or "donner le coup de grâce" in the French report, in respect of the enforceability of exclusion clauses. The judges were divided five:four in regard to the applicability of their ruling to the facts of this particular case.

The facts in this case were that in 2000, British Columbia (Transportation and Highways) invited expressions of interest in a construction contract for a road from Ging̱olx to Lax̱g̱altsʼap, which are 30 kilometres (19 mi) apart in the Nass River valley in northern British Columbia. Six teams expressed interest, and all six were selected and invited to tender. Under the terms of the invitation, only the six groups who expressed interest were eligible to submit a tender. However, Brentwood Enterprises Ltd., who had expressed interest, joined with another business, Emil Anderson Construction (EAC) to submit a bid. When Brentwood with EAC was selected as the successful bidder, Tercon challenged the decision. At the initial trial, the judge found that Brentwood/EAC's bid was substantially a joint venture from an ineligible bidder, and awarded damages of $3,293,998 to Tercon. The British Columbia Court of Appeal decided "it was unnecessary to address this issue".

The request for proposals issued by British Columbia (Transportation and Highways) stated that

Except as expressly and specifically permitted in these Instructions to Proponents, no Proponent shall have any claim for any compensation of any kind whatsoever, as a result of participating in this RFP, and by submitting a proposal each proponent shall be deemed to have agreed that it has no claim.

The case for Tercon was decided by a majority of five to four in favour but "both the majority and the dissenting Justices agreed that the doctrine of fundamental breach should be retired in respect of the enforceability of exclusion clauses". In place of the doctrine, the court created a three-stage test to evaluate the application of exclusion clauses. The first step is to evaluate the exclusion clause in the factual context of each case to determine if it applies to the material circumstances. The second step is to evaluate if the exclusion clause was unconscionable at the time of incorporation, and the final step is to evaluate whether the exclusion clause should not be enforced on public policy grounds.
