= Shadow of the law =

The shadow of the law is a concept in American legal literature which refers to settling cases or making plea bargains in a way that takes into account what would happen at trial. It has been argued that criminal trials resolve such a small percentage of criminal cases "that their shadows are faint and hard to discern."

The phrase was coined by law professors Robert H. Mnookin and Lewis Kornhauser (when they were colleagues at the University of California, Berkeley), and was popularized by them in a 1979 law review article; it has since become common in sociolegal literature.

Today, Mnookin and Kornhauser's 1979 article is widely recognized as a landmark article "which legitimized the study of negotiation within the legal academy" by "tethering bargaining to jurisprudence". A 2012 study determined that as of that year, it was the nineteenth most-cited law review article of all time.
