= Yam Seng Pte Ltd v International Trade Corp Ltd =

2013 English law case, establishing good faith requirement in contracts

Yam Seng Ltd v ITC Ltd
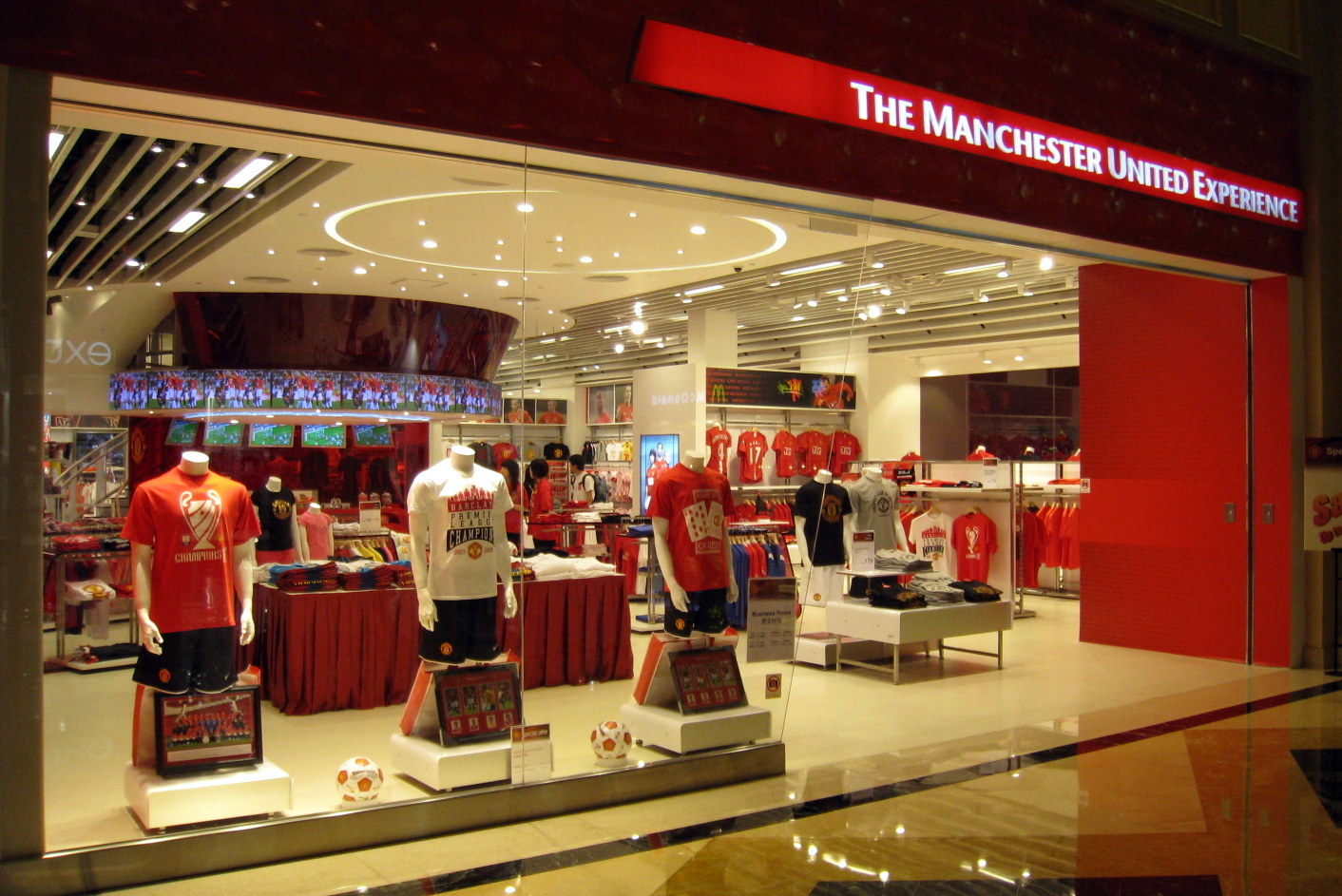
- The "Manchester United Experience" in Macau
- Court: High Court
- Citation: [2013] EWHC 111

Keywords
- Contract, good faith

Yam Seng Pte Ltd v International Trade Corporation Ltd [2013] EWHC 111 is an English contract law case, concerning the principle of good faith. The case posited that English law should recognize a limited form of good faith as an implied contract term.

== Facts ==
In 2009, ITC (International Trade Corporation) gave Yam Seng the exclusive rights to distribute "Manchester United" fragrances in parts of the Middle East, Asia, Africa and Australia. In July 2010, Yam Seng was terminated because ITC allegedly repudiated the agreement by threatening to use another distributor and breaching the implied term of good faith performance by giving false information through Mr. Presswell to Yam Seng's Mr. Tuli.

== Judgment ==
Leggatt J held that there was a duty to be honest, which is part of good faith, and that ITC had made a repudiatory breach of contract.

123. Three main reasons have been given for what Professor McKendrick has called the "traditional English hostility" towards a doctrine of good faith: see McKendrick, Contract Law (9th Ed) pp.221-2. The first is the one referred to by Bingham LJ in the passage quoted above: the preferred method of English law is to proceed incrementally by fashioning particular solutions in response to particular problems rather than enforcing broad overarching principles. A second reason is that English law is said to embody an ethos of individualism, whereby the parties are free to pursue their own self-interest not only in negotiating but also in performing contracts provided that they do not breach any of the contract's terms. The third reason given is a fear that recognizing a general requirement of good faith in the performance of contracts would create too much uncertainty. There is concern that the content of the obligation would be vague and subjective and that its adoption would undermine the goal of contractual certainty to which English law has always attached great weight.
124. In refusing, however, if indeed it does refuse, to recognize any such general obligation of good faith, this jurisdiction would appear to be swimming against the tide. As noted by Bingham LJ in the Interfoto Picture Library Ltd v Stiletto Visual Programmes Ltd, a general principle of good faith (derived from Roman law) is recognized by most civil law systems – including those of Germany, France, and Italy. From that source, references to good faith have already entered into English law via EU legislation. For example, the Unfair Terms in Consumer Contracts Regulations 1999, which give effect to a European directive, contain a requirement of good faith. Several other examples of legislation implementing EU directives that use this concept are mentioned in Chitty on Contract Law (31st Ed), Vol 1 at para 1-043. Attempts to harmonize the contract law of EU member states, such as the Principles of European Contract Law proposed by the Lando Commission and the European Commission's proposed Regulation for a Common European Sales Law on which consultation is currently taking place, also embody a general duty to act in accordance with good faith and fair dealing. There can be little doubt that the penetration of this principle into English law and the pressures towards a more unified European law of contract in which the principle plays a significant role will continue to increase.
125. It would be a mistake, moreover, to suppose that willingness to recognize a doctrine of good faith in the performance of contracts reflects a divide between civil law and common law systems or between continental paternalism and Anglo-Saxon individualism. Any such notion is gainsaid by the fact that such a doctrine has long been recognized in the United States. The New York Court of Appeals said in 1918: "Every contract implies good faith and fair dealing between the parties to it": Wigand v Bachmann-Bechtel Brewing Co, 222 NY 272 at 277. The Uniform Commercial Code first promulgated in 1951 and which has been adopted by many States, provides in section 1-203 that "every contract or duty within this Act imposes an obligation of good faith in its performance or enforcement." Similarly, the Restatement (Second) of Contracts states in section 205 that "every contract imposes upon each party a duty of good faith and fair dealing in its performance and enforcement."
126. In recent years the concept has been gaining ground in other common law jurisdictions. Canadian courts have proceeded cautiously in recognizing duties of good faith in the performance of commercial contracts but have, at least in some situations, been willing to imply such duties with a view to securing the performance and enforcement of the contractor, as it is sometimes put, to ensure that parties do not act in a way that eviscerates or defeats the objectives of the agreement that they have entered into: see e.g. Transamerica Life Inc v ING Canada Inc (2003) 68 OR (3d) 457, 468.
127. In Australia, the existence of a contractual duty of good faith is now well established, although the limits and precise juridical basis of the doctrine remain unsettled. The springboard for this development has been the decision of the New South Wales Court of Appeal in Renard Constructions (ME) Pty v Minister for Public Works (1992) 44 NSWLR 349, where Priestley JA said (at 95) that:
  "... people generally, including judges and other lawyers, from all strands of the community, have grown used to the courts applying standards of fairness to contract which are wholly consistent with the existence in all contracts of a duty upon the parties of good faith and fair dealing in its performance. In my view, this is in these days the expected standard, and anything less is contrary to prevailing community expectations."
128. Although the High Court has not yet considered the question (and declined to do so in Royal Botanic Gardens and Domain Trust v Sydney City Council (2002) 186 ALR 289) there has been clear recognition of the duty of good faith in a substantial body of Australian case law, including further significant decisions of the New South Wales Court of Appeal in Alcatel Australia Ltd v Scarcella (1998) 44 NSWLR 349, Burger King Corporation v Hungry Jack's Pty Ltd [2001] NWSCA 187 and Vodafone Pacific Ltd v Mobile Innovations Ltd [2004] NSWCA 15.
129. In New Zealand, a doctrine of good faith is not yet established law but it has its advocates: see in particular the dissenting judgment of Thomas J in Bobux Marketing Ltd v Raynor Marketing Ltd [2002] 1 NZLR 506 at 517.
130. Closer to home, there is strong authority for the view that Scottish law recognizes a broad principle of good faith and fair dealing: see the decision of the House of Lords in Smith v Bank of Scotland, 1997 SC (HL) 111 esp. at p.121 (per Lord Clyde).
131. Under English law, a duty of good faith is implied by law as an incident of certain categories of contract, for example, contracts of employment and contracts between partners or others whose relationship is characterized as a fiduciary one. I doubt that English law has reached the stage, however, where it is ready to recognize a requirement of good faith as a duty implied by law, even as a default rule, into all commercial contracts. Nevertheless, there seems to me to be no difficulty, following the established methodology of English law for the implication of terms in fact, in implying such a duty in any ordinary commercial contract based on the presumed intention of the parties.

== See also ==
- English contract law
