= Good faith =

Intention to be fair, open, and honest

In human interactions, good faith (Latin: bona fidēs) is a sincere intention to be fair, open, and honest, regardless of the outcome of the interaction. It is an important concept within law and business. The opposed concepts are bad faith, mala fides (duplicity) and perfidy (pretense).

== Bona fides ==
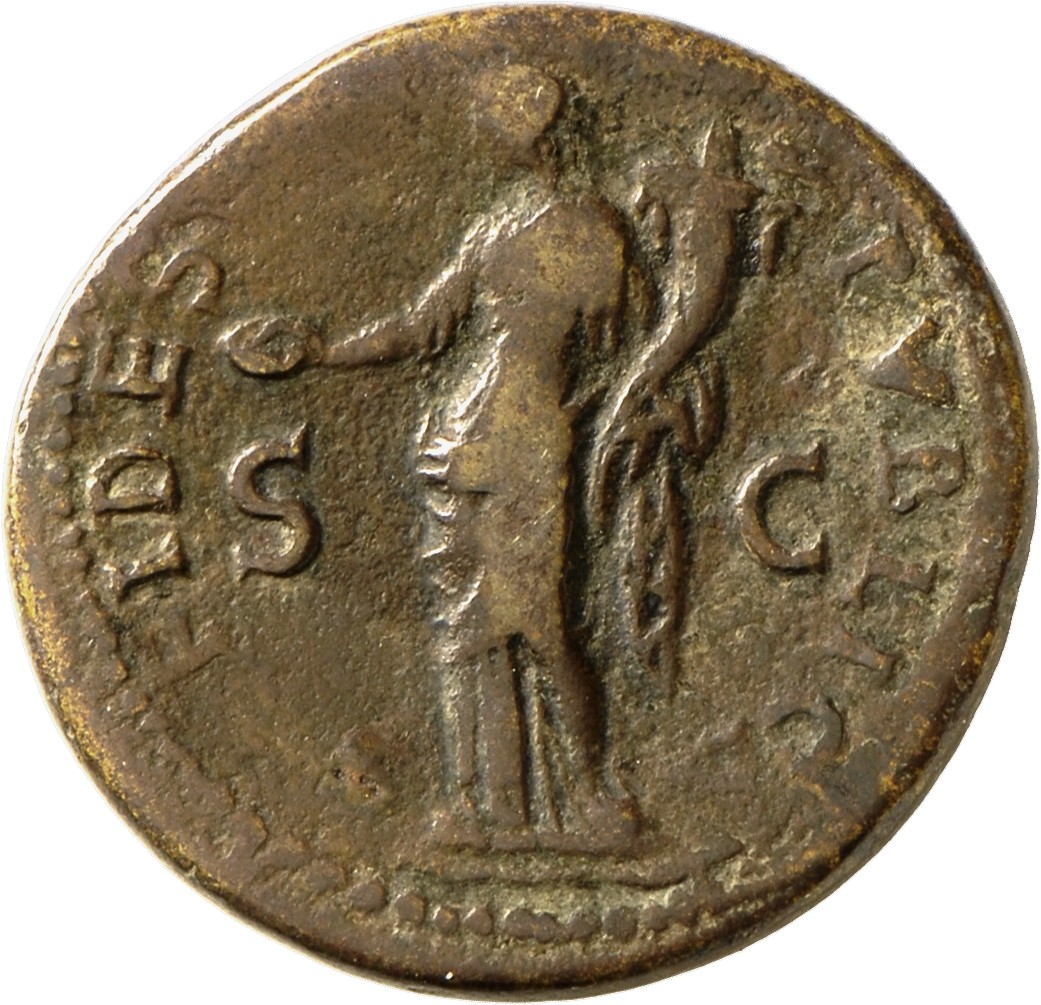
Reverse of a dupondius issued under the emperor Vespasian depicting Fides Publica, the public trust, holding a patera as a symbol of religious fidelity and a cornucopia

Bona fides is a Latin phrase meaning "good faith". Its ablative case is bona fide, meaning "in good faith", which is often used in English as an adjective to mean "genuine". Some Latin phrases have lost their literal meaning over centuries, but bona fides is still widely used and interchangeable with its generally accepted modern-day English translation of good faith. While fides may be translated as "faith", it embraces a range of meanings within a core concept of "reliability", in the sense of a trust between two parties for the potentiality of a relationship. For the ancient Romans, bona fides was to be assumed by both sides, with implied responsibilities and both legal and religious consequences if broken. According to Roman law, "bona fides requires that what has been agreed upon be done" and was the principle of acting with integrity. Fides was one of the original virtues to be considered a divinity in ancient Roman religion.

In contemporary English, bona fides is synonymous with credentials and identity. The phrase is sometimes used in job advertisements, and should not be confused with the bona fide occupational qualifications or the employer's good faith effort, as described below.

== Law ==
In law, bona fides denotes the mental and moral states of honesty and conviction regarding either the truth or the falsity of a proposition, or of a body of opinion; likewise regarding either the rectitude or the depravity of a line of conduct. As a legal concept, bona fides is especially important in matters of equity. The concept of bona fide is also proclaimed by the original version of Magna Carta. In contract law, the implied covenant of good faith is a general presumption that the parties to a contract will deal with each other honestly and fairly, so as not to destroy the right of the other party or parties to receive the benefits of the contract. In insurance law, the insurer's breach of the implied covenant may give rise to a legal liability known as insurance bad faith.

Most U.S. jurisdictions view breaches of implied covenants of good faith and fair dealing solely as variants of breach of contract. Linguistically, in the U.S., American English usage of bona fides is synonymous with credentials, professional background, and documents attesting a person's identity, which is not synonymous with bona fide occupational qualifications. More recently, other common law countries have begun to adopt good faith as a general principle. In the U.K., the High Court in Yam Seng Pte Ltd v International Trade Corp Ltd expressed this preference. In Canada, the Supreme Court declared in Bhasin v Hrynew that good faith was a general organizing principle.

== Employment qualification ==
Bona fide occupational qualifications (employer's good faith effort) are qualities or attributes that employers are allowed to consider when making decisions on the hiring and retaining of employees. An employer's good faith effort is used as an evaluation tool by the jurisdiction during the annual program review process to determine an employer's level of commitment to the reduction goals of the Washington State's Commute Trip Reduction Law. United States federal and state governments are required by affirmative action (and other such laws) to look for disabled, minority, female, and veteran business enterprises when bidding public jobs. Good faith effort law varies from state to state and even within states depending on the awarding department of the government. Most good faith effort requires advertising in state certified publications, usually a trade and a focus publication. Other countries such as Canada have similar programs.

== In wikis ==
Public wikis depend on their editors acting in good faith. Wikipedia's principle Assume Good Faith (often abbreviated AGF) has been a stated guideline since 2005. It has been described as "the first principle in the Wikipedia etiquette". According to one study of users' motives for contributing to Wikipedia, "while participants have both individualistic and collaborative motives, collaborative (altruistic) motives dominate."

== See also ==
- Convention Relating to the Status of Refugees – 1951 United Nations multilateral treaty
- Hanlon's razor – Adage to assume stupidity over malice
- Honour system – Process of governing without enforcement
- Kindness – Type of behaviour
- List of Latin phrases
- Make one's bones – American English idiom; to build respect
- Pacta sunt servanda – Latin legal phrase
- Uberrima fides – Legal doctrine of insurance contracts
