= Inequality of bargaining power =

Unfavourable contract situation

Inequality of bargaining power in law, economics and social sciences refers to a situation where one party to a bargain, contract or agreement, has more and better alternatives than the other party. This results in one party having greater power than the other to choose not to take the deal and makes it more likely that this party will gain more favourable terms and grant them more negotiating power (as they are in a better position to reject the deal). Inequality of bargaining power is generally thought to undermine the freedom of contract, resulting in a disproportionate level of freedom between parties, and it represents a place at which markets fail.

Where bargaining power is persistently unequal, the concept of inequality of bargaining power serves as a justification for the implication of mandatory terms into contracts by law, or the non-enforcement of a contract by the courts.

== Historical development ==
The concept of inequality of bargaining power was long recognised, particularly with regard to workers. In the Wealth of Nations (1776), Adam Smith wrote,

It is not, however, difficult to foresee which of the two parties must, upon all ordinary occasions, have the advantage in the dispute, and force the other into a compliance with their terms. The masters, being fewer in number, can combine much more easily; and the law, besides, authorizes, or at least does not prohibit their combinations, while it prohibits those of the workmen. We have no acts of parliament against combining to lower the price of work; but many against combining to raise it. In all such disputes the masters can hold out much longer. A landlord, a farmer, a master manufacturer, a merchant, though they did not employ a single workman, could generally live a year or two upon the stocks which they have already acquired. Many workmen could not subsist a week, few could subsist a month, and scarce any a year without employment. In the long run the workman may be as necessary to his master as his master is to him; but the necessity is not so immediate.

Beatrice Webb and Sidney Webb in their 1897 treatise Industrial Democracy significantly expanded on the critique of 19th century labour conditions and advocated a comprehensive system of labour law contained a chapter called, "The Higgling of the Market". They argued that the labour market was dominated by employers, and therefore had the same effect as monopsony. Workers generally are more under pressure to sell their labour than an employer is under to buy it. An employer can hold out longer, because typically he will have greater financial reserves. This means that much labour is supplied merely out of necessity, than free choice (shifting the supply curve to the right) and it is a false kind of competitive environment. The Webbs also pointed out that discrimination can decrease job opportunities for women or minorities, and that the legal institutions underpinning the market were skewed in favour of employers. Most importantly, they believed that a large pool of unemployed people was a constant downward drag on the ability of workers to bargain for better conditions.

When the unemployed are crowding round the factory gates every morning, it is plain to each man that, unless he can induce the foreman to select him rather than another, his chance of subsistence for weeks to come may be irretrievably lost. Under these circumstances bargaining, in the case of the individual isolated workmen, becomes absolutely impossible.

The Webbs felt that these factors all added up to systemic inequality of bargaining power between workers and employers. The first ever use of the phrase "inequality of bargaining power", however, appears to have been by the British philosopher, John Beattie Crozier in The Wheel of Wealth.

There must always be an inequality of bargaining power between masters and men in every contract, until that day shall arrive when the sacrifices of each master in a strike or lock out will affect his present comfort and future destiny as seriously, in its way, as it does that of each of his workmen.

- Max Weber, The Theory of Social and Economic Organization (1915, translated 1947) 152, ‘Power is the probability that one actor within a social relationship will be in a position to carry out his own will, despite resistance, regardless of the basis on which this probability rests.’
- JR Commons, JR Andrews, American Bureau of Industrial Research, Principles of Labor Legislation (1916) 28, 30, 245
- JR Commons, History of Labour in the United States (1918) 34
- AC Pigou, The Economics of Welfare (1920)
- Robert Dahl, ‘The Concept of Power’ (1957) 2(3) Behavioral Science 201, 202–203, power is when A ‘can get B to do something that B would not otherwise do’.
- MJ Trebilcock, ‘An Economic Approach to the Doctrine of Unconscionability’ in BJ Reiter and J Swan (eds) Studies in Contract (1980)

"The real measure of market power is not whether a supplier presents his terms on a take-it-or-leave basis but whether the consumer, if he decides to ‘leave it’ has available to him a workably competitive range of alternative sources of supply. Whether this is or is not so simply cannot be derived intuitively from the fact that a particular supplier is offering non-negotiable standard-form terms. It is a matter for independent inquiry. If the market is workably competitive, any supplier offering uncompetitive standard form terms will have to reformulate his total package of price and non-price terms to prevent consumers (at least consumers at the margin, which are the decisive consideration in such a market) from switching their business to other competitors....

Non-economists often overlook the importance of marginal analysis in this context. For example, if only 10 per cent of the buyers of insurance policies or dry-cleaning services studied all terms scrupulously before contracting and were influenced in their choice of policy by their evaluation of the so-called fine print clauses, and if no supplier of insurance or dry-cleaning services was able to ‘term discriminate’ between these consumers and other consumers in the market, there would be strong competitive pressures on each supplier to adjust the terms of his contracts so as to avoid losing this potential business....

When one asks why, many consumers probably rely in part on the constraints imposed by other consumers at the margin (ie, they let the market shop for them)."

- H Beale, ‘Inequality of bargaining power’ (1986) 6(1) OJLS 123, 127

"The point is obvious but worth making because it affects the conditions under which relief should be given: whereas advice as to value will normally save the contract with the ‘poor and ignorant person’, the master of the ship drifting onto the rocks would still have been open to exploitation even if he had had the entire House of Lords on board to advise him."

== Legal use ==
Schroeder Music Publishing Co Ltd v Macaulay [1974] 1 WLR 1308, 1316, per Lord Diplock: “To be in a position to adopt this [‘take it or leave it’] attitude toward a party desirous of entering into a contract to obtain goods or services provides a classic instance of superior bargaining power.”

=== Consumer laws ===
- F Kessler, ‘Contracts of Adhesion--Some thoughts about Freedom of Contract’ (1943) 43 Columbia Law Review 629, 631-2

"In so far as the reduction of costs of production and distribution thus achieved is reflected in reduced prices, society as a whole ultimately benefits from the use of standard contracts… The use of contracts has, however, another aspect which has become increasingly important. Standard contracts are typically used by enterprises with strong bargaining power. The weaker party, in need of the goods or services, is frequently not in a position to shop around for better terms, either because the author of the standard contract has a monopoly (natural or artificial) or because all competitors use the same clauses. His contractual intention is but a subjection more or less voluntary to terms dictated by the stronger party, terms whose consequences are often understood only in a vague way, if at all."

- Lowe v Lombank [1960] 1 WLR 196, Diplock J talking about ignorant consumers getting hire purchase goods not being of equal bargaining power
- Williams v. Walker-Thomas Furniture Co., 350 F.2d 445 (CA DC 1965) a loan agreement made so no furniture bought could be paid off unless the whole lot was.
- Uniform Commercial Code §2-302
- In Lloyds Bank Ltd v Bundy [1975] QB 326, Lord Denning wrote that "Gathering all together, I would suggest that through all these instances there runs a single thread. They rest on "inequality of bargaining power". By virtue of it, the English law gives relief to one who, without independent advice, enters into a contract upon terms which are very unfair or transfers property for a consideration which is grossly inadequate, when his bargaining power is grievously impaired by reason of his own needs or desires, or by his own ignorance or infirmity, coupled with undue influences or pressures brought to bear on him by or for the benefit of the other."
- Law Commission, Second Report on Exemption Clauses in Contracts (No 69)
- Unfair Contract Terms Act 1977
- Courage Ltd v Crehan (2001) Case C-453/99, [31]-[33], regarding damages for breach of competition laws, the European Court of Justice said, "... a litigant should not profit from his own unlawful conduct, where this is proven. In that regard, the matters to be taken into account by the competent national court include the economic and legal context in which the parties find themselves and, as the United Kingdom Government rightly points out, the respective bargaining power and conduct of the two parties to the contract. In particular, it is for the national court to ascertain whether the party who claims to have suffered loss through concluding a contract that is liable to restrict or distort competition found himself in a markedly weaker position than the other party, such as seriously to compromise or even eliminate his freedom to negotiate the terms of the contract and his capacity to avoid the loss or reduce its extent, in particular by availing himself in good time of all the legal remedies available to him."
- Hang Seng Credit Card Ltd v Tsang Nga Lee (2000), a Hong Kong court noted that a credit card company or bank was in a much stronger bargaining position than the ordinary cardholder. It treated this as relevant to whether standard-form cost-indemnity terms were unconscionable under the Unconscionable Contracts Ordinance.

=== Labour laws ===
- Holden v. Hardy 169 US 366 (1898) Utah law limiting work hours upheld, Brown J

"The legislature has also recognized the fact, which the experience of legislators in many states has corroborated, that the proprietors of these establishments and their operatives do not stand upon an equality, and that their interests are, to a certain extent, conflicting. The former naturally desire to obtain as much labor as possible from their employees, while the latter are often induced by the fear of discharge to conform to regulations which their judgment, fairly exercised, would pronounce to be detrimental to their health or strength. In other words, the proprietors lay down the rules, and the laborers are practically constrained to obey them. In such cases self-interest is often an unsafe guide, and the legislature may properly interpose its authority."

- Adair v. United States, 209 U.S. 161, 175 (1908) "the employer and the employee have equality of right and any legislation that disturbs that equality is an arbitrary interference with the liberty of contract which no government can legally justify in our free land.”
- Coppage v. Kansas, 236 U.S. 1 (1915)
- United States. Commission on Industrial Relations; Francis Patrick Walsh, Basil Maxwell Manly, ‘Industrial relations: Final report and testimony’ (1916)
- Topeka Laundry Co. v. Court of Int’l Relations, 237 P. 1041, 1044 (Kan. 1925) “Each statute undertook to remedy the mischief [of substandard wages for women and minors] by fixing a standard below which wages might not be depressed . . . because of inequality of bargaining power between employer and employee . . . .”
- France v James Coombes & Co [1929] AC 496, 505–6, in a case restricting the definition of ‘employee’ for the purpose of s 8 Trade Boards Act 1909, 1918, for an order to give a minimum wage to boot workers, where the worker was not working all the time when he was in the shop Lord Atkin said, ‘the presumed necessity for fixing any minimum wage rate at all in any particular trade is due to the apprehension on the part of the Minister that in its absence workmen in that trade may have imposed upon them wages which they ought not to be asked to accept, but which, either as a result of competition in the labour market or deficient bargaining power, they are not in a position to refuse’
- National Labor Relations Act of 1935 Section 1, at 29 U.S.C. §151

"The inequality of bargaining power between employees who do not possess full freedom of association or actual liberty of contract and employers who are organized in the corporate or other forms of ownership association substantially burdens and affects the flow of commerce, and tends to aggravate recurrent business depressions, by depressing wage rates and the purchasing power of wage earners in industry and by preventing the stabilization of competitive wage rates and working conditions within and between industries."

- NLRB v. Mackay Radio & Telegraph Co. 304 U.S. 333 (1938) where the US Supreme Court held employers can replace striking workers, though workers remain employees during a strike and can get a reinstatement remedy.
- Radcliffe v Ribble Motor Services Ltd [1939] AC 215, 241, Lord Wright in a judgment restricting common employment notes ‘how little bargaining power a workman possessed’
- Rookes v Barnard [1964] AC 1129, 1219, per Lord Devlin,

"It is easy now to see that Parliament in 1906 might have felt that the only way of giving labour an equality of bargaining power with capital was to give it special immunities which the common law did not permit. Even now, when the scales have been redressed, it is easy to see that Parliament might think that a strike, whether reprehensible or not, ought not to be made a ground for litigation and that industrial peace should be sought by other means."

- Certification of the Constitution of the Republic of South Africa [1996] ZACC 26, [66], "A related argument was that the principle of equality requires that, if the right to strike is included in the NT, so should the right to lock out be included. This argument is based on the proposition that the right of employers to lock out is the necessary equivalent of the right of workers to strike and that therefore, in order to treat workers and employers equally, both should be recognised in the NT. That proposition cannot be accepted. Collective bargaining is based on the recognition of the fact that employers enjoy greater social and economic power than individual workers. Workers therefore need to act in concert to provide them collectively with sufficient power to bargain effectively with employers. Workers exercise collective power primarily through the mechanism of strike action. In theory, employers, on the other hand, may exercise power against workers through a range of weapons, such as dismissal, the employment of alternative or replacement labour, the unilateral implementation of new terms and conditions of employment, and the exclusion of workers from the workplace (the last of these being generally called a lockout). The importance of the right to strike for workers has led to it being far more frequently entrenched in constitutions as a fundamental right than is the right to lock out. The argument that it is necessary in order to maintain equality to entrench the right to lock out once the right to strike has been included, cannot be sustained, because the right to strike and the right to lock out are not always and necessarily equivalent."

=== Landlord and tenant ===
- Rugby Joint Water Board v Footit [1973] AC 202, Lord Simon, landlord and tenant
- Johnson v Moreton [1980] AC 37, Lord Simon, "There was one economic and social relationship where it was claimed that there were palpably lacking the prerequisites for the beneficent operation of laisser-faire - that of landlord and tenant. The market was limited and sluggish: the supply of land could not expand immediately and flexibly in response to demand, and even humble dwellings took more time to erect than those in want of them could spare. Generally, a man became a tenant rather than an owner-occupier because his circumstances compelled him to live hand-to-mouth; the landlord's purse was generally longer and his command of knowledge and counsel far greater than the tenant's. In short, it was held, the constriction of the market and the inequality of bargaining power enabled the landlord to dictate contractual terms which did not necessarily operate to the general benefit of society. It was to counteract this descried constriction of the market and to redress this descried inequality of bargaining power that the law - specifically, in the shape of legislation - came to intervene repeatedly to modify freedom of contract between landlord and tenant. Since Maine the movement of many "progressive" societies has been reversed. The holding of a statutory or a protected tenancy is rather a status than a pure creature of contract."
- Attorney General of Canada v Nav Canada (2008) FC 71, [19] Hugessen J of the Canadian Federal Court, approved the purpose of the Residential Tenancy Act in the Northwest Territories (replicated across Canadian provinces) as follows: ‘Bearing in mind the usual disparity of bargaining power and financial resources between such tenants and their landlords, the Act is evidently intended to restore the balance of power through the public employment of a rental officer to try and mediate and, if necessary, to adjudicate disputes between them.’ The Canadian Residential Tenancy Acts say residential tenancies can only be terminated with good reasons, and limit annual rental increases to a figure set by a Central Board. It should be appreciated how this differs from rent control laws, which place inflexible ceilings on any increases.

== See also ==
- Bargaining power
- Freedom of contract
- Wage slavery
- George Mitchell (Chesterhall) Ltd v Finney Lock Seeds Ltd [1983] QB 284
- Employment Relations Act 2000 (New Zealand)
- Information asymmetry
- Intra-household bargaining
- Contract of adhesion
- Contra proferentem
- Unfair Terms in Consumer Contracts Directive 1993
