= Diprose =

Diprose is a surname. Notable people with the surname include:

- Graham Diprose, English photographer and author
- Jack Diprose (1905–2002), Australian rules footballer
- Noel Diprose (1922–2006), Australian cricketer
- Rosalyn Diprose, emeritus Professor of philosophy at University of New South Wales
- Tony Diprose (born 1972), former English rugby union footballer

== See also ==
- Louth v Diprose, an Australian contract law and equity case
