= Unconscionability =

Doctrine in contract law

Unconscionability (sometimes known as unconscionable dealing/conduct in Australia) is a doctrine in contract law that describes terms that are so extremely unjust, or overwhelmingly one-sided in favor of the party who has the superior bargaining power, that they are contrary to good conscience. Typically, an unconscionable contract is held to be unenforceable because no reasonable or informed person would otherwise agree to it. The perpetrator of the conduct is not allowed to benefit, because the consideration offered is lacking, or is so obviously inadequate, that to enforce the contract would be unfair to the party seeking to escape the contract.

== Overview ==
Unconscionability is determined by examining the circumstances of the parties when the contract was made, such as their bargaining power, age, and mental capacity. Other issues might include lack of choice, superior knowledge, and other obligations or circumstances surrounding the bargaining process. Unconscionable conduct is also found in acts of fraud and deceit, where the deliberate misrepresentation of fact deprives someone of a valuable possession. When a party takes unconscionable advantage of another, the action may be treated as criminal fraud or the civil action of deceit.

For a contract to be unconscionable, it must have been unconscionable at the time it was made; later circumstances that make the contract extremely one-sided are irrelevant. Criteria for determining unconscionability vary between jurisdictions and the question of whether a contract is unconscionable is regarded as a question of law rather than a question of fact; meaning that, in jurisdictions where juries are employed in civil cases, it is the judge and not the jurors who decide whether to apply the doctrine. Upon finding unconscionability, a court has significant flexibility on how it remedies the situation. It may refuse to enforce the contract against the party unfairly treated on the theory that they were misled, lacked information, or signed under duress or misunderstanding; it may refuse to enforce the offending clause, or take other measures it deems necessary to have a fair outcome and damages are usually not awarded. For instance, in Uber Technologies Inc v Heller (2020) the Supreme Court of Canada found an arbitration clause requiring gig workers in Ontario to litigate before the Dutch International Chamber of Commerce was unconscionable and so void.

Procedural unconscionability is seen as the disadvantage suffered by a weaker party in negotiations, whereas substantive unconscionability refers to the unfairness of terms or outcomes. Most often the former will lead to the latter, but not always. The existence of the procedural unconscionability without substantive unconscionability may be sufficient to set aside a contract, but the latter, by itself, may not. As with issues of consideration, the court's role is not to determine whether someone has made a good or bad bargain, but merely whether that party had the opportunity to properly judge what was best in their own interests.

There are several typical examples in which unconscionability are most frequently found:

- Where a party that typically engages in sophisticated business transactions inserts boilerplate language into a contract containing terms unlikely to be understood or appreciated by the average person, such as a disclaimer of warranties, or a provision extending liability for a newly purchased item to goods previously purchased from the same seller.
- Where a seller vastly inflates the price of goods, particularly when this inflation is conducted in a way that conceals from the buyer the total cost for which the buyer will ultimately be liable. A similar example would be severe penalty provisions for failure to pay loan installments promptly that are physically hidden by small print located in the middle of an obscure paragraph of a lengthy loan agreement. In such a case a court may find that there is no meeting of the minds of the parties to the contract and that the weaker party has not accepted the terms of the contract.
- Where a seller offers a standardized contract of adhesion for the purchase of necessary goods or services (e.g. food, shelter, means of transportation) to consumers on a "take it or leave it" basis, without giving consumers realistic opportunities to negotiate terms that would benefit their interests. While there is nothing unenforceable or even wrong about adhesion contracts in themselves, specific terms may render them unconscionable. Examples of gross one-sidedness would be provisions that limit damages against the seller, or limit the rights of the purchaser to seek relief in the courts against the seller. In the 2009 case of Harris v. Blockbuster, Inc., the plaintiff argued that Blockbuster's provision to compel arbitration and forbid class action lawsuits was illusory and unconscionable. However, whether that contract was unconscionable is unknown, as the court ruled that it was illusory and therefore not enforceable, and disregarded all further consideration.

== By jurisdiction ==
=== Australia ===
The leading Australian case is Commercial Bank of Australia Ltd v Amadio, in which an elderly Italian migrant couple guaranteed their builder son's business debts to the Commercial Bank. At the time the mortgage was executed, the bank manager was aware of the son's precarious financial position and knew that the Amadios, who did not speak English well, were not so informed, but did nothing to further explain the situation to them or suggest they get independent advice. In addition, the bank did not advise the Amadios that there was no limit on their liability under the guarantee; the Amadios believed their liability was limited to $50,000.

When the son's business failed, the Amadios had the contract set aside due to unconscionable dealing by the bank. The court held that the bank manager knew about the "special disability" of Amadios, referring to their advanced age, lack of business acumen, lack of fluency in written English, and their reliance on their son's [inadequate] disclosure of his finances. A special disability is one which seriously affects the ability of the person subject to it to make sensible decisions of their own best interest. This "disability" was sufficiently evident to the bank, as the stronger party, to make their acceptance of the weaker party's assent to the transaction manifestly unfair. The bank did not ensure that the Amadios fully understood the nature of the transaction; therefore, the bank's taking advantage of the opportunity that presented itself was unconscionable.

While Amadio is the leading authority on unconscionable dealing in Australia, courts have frequently relied upon other cases to help define what constitutes special disability. Courts have extended the scope of what is special disability to include infatuation causing vulnerability and mental disorder. In Louth v Diprose, the Respondent, a solicitor, was infatuated with Louth. He provided her with a multitude of gratuitous gifts and a marriage proposal, which Louth declined. Louth suffered from depression and threatened to commit suicide if she were to become evicted. In response, the Respondent bought her a house and put it in Louth's name. Following a deterioration of the relationship, the Respondent requested Louth to transfer the property in his name, which Louth refused. The Respondent initiated legal proceedings to recover the property, alleging he had suffered a special disability entitling rescission of the contract. Deane J, in the majority, held that Diprose's infatuation placed him in a position of emotional dependence which placed Louth in a position of ascendancy and influence. Louth was found to be aware of the special disability she had deliberately created and exploited it for her benefit, even though Louth articulated her lack of romantic interest in Diprose on numerous occasions.

Intoxication is generally not regarded as a special disability, although in Blomley v Ryan it was found that the severity of Ryan's drunkenness, in combination with Blomley's knowledge of his alcoholism, was enough to warrant special disability. In Blomley v Ryan, the Plaintiff purchased a property from the Defendant at a very low price. During the transaction, the Defendant was of old age and heavily intoxicated which was conspicuous to the Plaintiff. After the transaction, the Defendant refused to perform the transfer of property and so the Plaintiff sought specific performance while the Defendant sought to set aside the contract. The Court ruled that 'mere drunkenness' is not a defence to resist a contract. However, it stated that where there is knowledge of one party that the other party is seriously inebriated and that party takes advantage of such inebriation, equity will intervene to refuse specific performance.

Courts have also frequently relied upon the observation of the majority of the High Court in Krakowski v Eurolynx Properties Ltd when considering the amount of knowledge that can be imputed to a company.

Based on this case, the new concept of "unconscionability" in general and contractual law was passed by Australian legislation, defining it in two ways:

1. Using undue influence or coercion, where the consumer is not in a position to make an independent decision based on the fact that undue influence is made to bear upon him/her.
2. The stronger party is taking advantage of the fact that the consumer either does not have enough knowledge or understanding of the contract or is incapable of making an independent decision. The trader does not point out that the consumer has avenues in getting help in clearly understanding the contract. So, in this case, the trader is taking advantage of the consumer's lack of understanding for his own benefit.

Amadio and other cases have seen a greater willingness by courts to set aside contracts on the grounds of unconscionability. This has been partly influenced by recent statutory developments.

=== Canada ===
The doctrine of unconscionability is well-established in Canada, where it has branched from the older and more settled doctrine of undue influence. The leading case on unconscionability in Canada is Uber Technologies Inc v Heller (2020). As applied in Canada, the doctrine limits the enforceability of "unfair agreements that resulted from an inequality of bargaining power". The test for unconscionability applied by Canadian courts is to determine whether there was an inequality of bargaining power between the parties to the contract and, if so, whether this inequality resulted in the contract being an "improvident bargain" for the party with lesser bargaining power. The inequality criterion is satisfied where one party is unable to sufficiently protect its interests while negotiating the contract, while the improvidence criterion is satisfied where the contract "unduly advantages the stronger party or unduly disadvantages the more vulnerable". Improvidence must be measured with reference to the time of the contract's formation and involves a contextual assessment of "whether the potential for undue advantage or disadvantage created by the inequality of bargaining power has been realised". It is particularly relevant in the context of standard form contracts; especially with regard to choice of law, choice of court, or forum selection clauses. Where the disadvantaged party understood the improvident terms of the contract, the contract is unconscionable if they were so reliant on the advantaged party that they assented out of perceived necessity; meanwhile, where the disadvantaged party did not understand the improvident terms, "the focus is on whether they have been unduly disadvantaged by the terms they did not understand or appreciate". The intended purpose of the doctrine of unconscionability is "the protection of vulnerable persons in transactions with others".

- In Uber v Heller (2020), a gig worker was attempting to bring a class action lawsuit against Uber arguing that drivers are employees and therefore entitled to benefits under the Ontarian Employment Standards Act and equivalent legislation in other provinces and territories. However, Uber attempted to invoke an arbitration clause included in its contracts with Canadian drivers which required that all disputes between Uber and the drivers be resolved by arbitration in the Netherlands. In an 8–1 decision, the Supreme Court of Canada held that the arbitration clause in Heller's contract with Uber was unconscionable. Further, the majority held that the contract was void because it attempted to contract out of the Employment Standards Act. As a result, the Court allowed Heller's class action lawsuit against Uber to proceed to trial. Justice Russell Brown, in a concurring opinion, argued that the arbitration clause was unenforceable because it effectively denied Heller access to justice and was therefore contrary to public policy.
- In Harry v. Kreutziger (1978), Harry was a First Nations Aboriginal with a congenital partial hearing defect. A commercial fisherman, he had a grade 5 education and was not widely experienced in business matters. He owned a boat worth only $1,000, but it came with a fishing license: since the British Columbia government had ceased issuing new licenses, one could only be obtained through transferral. Due to this limitation and recent excellent salmon harvests, licenses were worth around $15,000, meaning that the total value of Harry's boat was $16,000. Kreutziger first offered Harry a check for $2,000, which he returned through his brother. Kreutziger gave him back the cheque several times, assuring Harry that as an Aboriginal he would easily be able to get another license. Harry finally agreed to sell for $4,500, but then Kreutziger unilaterally reduced the price by $570, deducting the cost of conversion of the boat license from an "AI" license (available only to Aboriginal peoples) into an "A" license. Harry then applied for another license, but was rejected on the grounds that he had left the fishing industry when he sold the boat. Harry sued to have the sale set aside, but was unsuccessful at trial. The British Columbia Court of Appeals found there was a clear inequality between the parties due to Harry's lack of education and physical handicap, as well as the difference in class, culture, and economic circumstances between the two parties. Kreutziger's actions clearly demonstrated his power; he was very aggressive in the negotiations and was able to unilaterally modify the price for his own benefit. Kreutziger was also unable to demonstrate that the deal was in any way fair, as the price was one-quarter of the true value of the boat and license. The court rescinded the contract because of the unconscionability of the underlying transaction, ruling that the buyer was trying to take advantage of the seller's lack of knowledge of the value of the license, and ordered Kreutziger to return the boat and license to Harry, and Harry to return the payment of $3,930 to Kreutziger.

=== England and Wales ===
"Inequality of bargaining power" is a term used in England and Wales to express essentially the same idea as unconscionability; which can in turn be further broken down into cases on duress, undue influence, and exploitation of weakness. In these cases, where someone's consent to a bargain was only procured through duress, out of undue influence or under severe external pressure that another person exploited, courts have felt it was unconscionable to enforce agreements. Controversy exists as to whether a contract should be voidable simply because one party was pressured by circumstances wholly outside the other party's control.

The leading case on undue influence is considered to be Lloyds Bank Ltd v Bundy which adopted the American position that all impairments of autonomy should fall under the single principle of "inequality of bargaining power". In this case, Bundy agreed to increase the mortgage on his farmhouse in order to maintain the line of credit being extended to his son's business. The question was whether the contract leading to the repossession of Bundy's farmhouse was voidable due to pressure brought by the bank. The Court of Appeal of England and Wales ruled that since the amount of the loan was already higher than the existing mortgage, Bundy received no direct benefit from the agreement to increase the mortgage amount; that the bank failed to notify him of the true financial condition of his son's business, and that it threatened to call in his son's loan if Bundy did not agree to the increase. Furthermore, since Bundy relied upon Lloyd's for the mortgage and his son's line of credit, the bank-customer relationship was found to have created a fiduciary duty; hence, the bank should have recommended that he seek independent legal advice. Lord Denning MR found that the contract was voidable owing to the unequal bargaining position in which Bundy had found himself, in that he had entered into the contract without independent advice and that unfair pressures were exerted by the bank. Essentially, the court ruled that only the bank benefitted from the agreement to raise the amount of the mortgage, and that it had exploited Bundy's weakness. The transaction was found to be unconscionable, and Bundy only had to honor the lower mortgage amount.

It is notable that Denning's judgment did not represent the law in National Westminster Bank plc v Morgan, in which a family home was likewise subjected to a second mortgage to secure a loan on the husband's business with Abbey National Bank. The Morgans got into arrears on the loan, and National Westminster Bank, commonly known as "NatWest", offered a rescue package to help the couple save their home, where they would pay off the existing mortgages and give the couple a bridge loan for the purposes of aiding the husband's business. In the limited time the NatWest manager spent alone with Mrs. Morgan, she stated that she did not want to be exposed to any extra risks, as she had no faith in her husband's business ability. The bank manager assured her that the risks were limited and did not advise her to get independent legal advice. She signed the contract, and the bank later called in the loan when the Morgans defaulted. Mrs. Morgan's defense was that the bank manager had exercised undue influence over her in procuring her signature. Unlike Lloyds Bank Ltd v Bundy, it was found that there was no undue influence since the transaction was not a "manifest disadvantage" to the couple, and that Mrs. Morgan had not established a relationship of trust and confidence in the brief time she spent with the NatWest manager.

Unconscionability is also an important element of the English law of trusts. A constructive trust arises, by operation of law, when the conscience of a legal owner is affected meaning they cannot deny the equitable interest of the beneficiary for whom they consequently hold the property as trustee. Additionally, unconscionability is a necessary element to the finding of proprietary estoppel.

=== United States ===
The leading case for unconscionability in the United States is Williams v. Walker-Thomas Furniture Co., in which the defendant, a retail furniture store, sold multiple items to a customer from 1957 to 1962. The extended credit contract was written so that none of the furniture was considered to be purchased until all of it was paid for. When the plaintiff defaulted and failed to make payments on the last item of furniture, the furniture store attempted to repossess all of the furniture sold since 1957, not just the last item. The District of Columbia Court of Appeals returned the case to the lower court for trial to determine further facts, but held that the contract could be considered unconscionable and negated if it was procured due to a gross inequality of bargaining power.

Under the Second Restatement of Contracts, a party may assert a claim for relief from unilateral mistake regarding the terms or conditions of a contract or a liquidated damages clause. Relief for unilateral mistake may be granted if the mistake would render enforcement of the contract unconscionable. The Restatement considers factors such as: 1) absence of reliance by the promisee; and 2) gross disparity in values exchanged. Despite the indication of these considerations, however, most challenges to liquidated damages clauses survive legal challenges based on unconscionability. The Restatement also has a separate provision on unconscionability at §208, "Unconscionable Contract or Term," which broadly allows a court to limit the application of an unconscionable term or contract in order to avoid an unconscionable result. Additionally, the concept as applied to sales of goods is codified in Section 2-302 of the Uniform Commercial Code.

=== Hong Kong ===
In Hong Kong, the Unconscionable Contracts Ordinance (Cap. 458) allows the court to refuse to enforce, or to modify, a contract or term that it finds unconscionable. In Hang Seng Credit Card Ltd v Tsang Nga Lee (2000), the Court of First Instance treated the Ordinance as remedial legislation to be read broadly, and held that credit card clauses entitling the issuer to a full indemnity for its legal costs of recovering debts were unconscionable.

== See also ==
- Armendariz v. Foundation Health Psychcare Services, Inc.
- Duress
- Implied warranty
- Liability waiver
- Mistake (contract law) § Unilateral Mistake § Exceptions: Exception (3).
- Moffat v Moffat
- Non est factum
- Undue influence
