= Liability waiver =

Legal document where a company attempts to remove legal liability from an activity

A liability waiver is a legal document that a person who participates in an activity may sign to acknowledge the risks involved in their participation. By doing so, the company attempts to remove legal liability from the business or person responsible for the activity.

== In the United States ==
In the United States, the enforceability of such a waiver depends on state law, a jury, and the language of the waiver. A signed liability waiver is not a blanket exemption from liability for operators of a dangerous activity. Under the law of tort, prior to injury, the specific risk must have been known to and appreciated by the plaintiff in order for primary assumption of risk to apply. Courts may refuse to enforce a general liability waiver if it fails to inform the signer of the specific risk that caused the injury.

Liability waivers include pre-accident releases and model releases (for pictures). Reckless or intentional actions can never be disclaimed and liability resulting from a faulty product cannot be waived in the state of California.

== See also ==
- Standard form contract#Contracts of adhesion
- Unconscionability
