= Armendariz v. Foundation Health Psychcare Services, Inc. =

- Supreme Court of California

Argued May 30, 2000 Decided August 24, 2000
- Full case name: Marybeth Armendariz et al., Plaintiffs and Respondents, v. Foundation Health Psychcare Services, Inc., Defendant and Appellant.
- Citation(s): 24 Cal. 4th 83, 6 P.3d 669; 99 Cal. Rptr. 2d. 745

Holding
- A contract must contain both a procedural and substantiative element of unconscionability in order to be void. Court of Appeal for the First District reversed.

Court membership
- Chief Justice: Ronald M. George
- Associate Justices: Stanley Mosk, Joyce L. Kennard, Marvin R. Baxter, Janice Rogers Brown, Kathryn Werdegar, Ming Chin

Case opinions
- Majority: Mosk, joined by George, Kennard, Baxter, Werdegar
- Concurrence: Brown, joined by Chin

Armendariz v. Foundation Health Psychcare Services, Inc., 24 Cal. 4th 83, 6 P.3d 669 (2000), was a case decided by the Supreme Court of California that defined the California standard for unconscionability.

Two former employees of Foundation Health Psychcare Services, Inc. (now part of Health Net), Marybeth Armendariz and Dolores Olague-Rodgers, filed complaints for wrongful termination against their former employer, contending in part that the presence of certain unconscionable provisions in their employment arbitration agreement should render the entire arbitration agreement unenforceable. Foundation Health argued that if some of the provisions were unconscionable or contrary to public policy, the proper remedy would be to strike or restrict those clauses pursuant to Civil Code section 1670.5, and to enforce the rest of the arbitration agreement.

In summarising developments leading to the decision of the Supreme Court of California, Judge Stanley Mosk stated:

The trial court chose the employees' preferred solution of refusing to enforce the arbitration agreement, but the Court of Appeal sided with the employer and enforced the agreement minus the one provision it found unconscionable. We [i.e. the Supreme Court] conclude ... that the arbitration agreement is unenforceable and that therefore the Court of Appeal's judgment must be reversed.

The court required that there be both a procedural and substantive element of unconscionability for a contract to be voided.
