= Hang Seng Credit Card Ltd v Tsang Nga Lee =

2000 Hong Kong case on unconscionable credit card costs clauses

- Court of First Instance
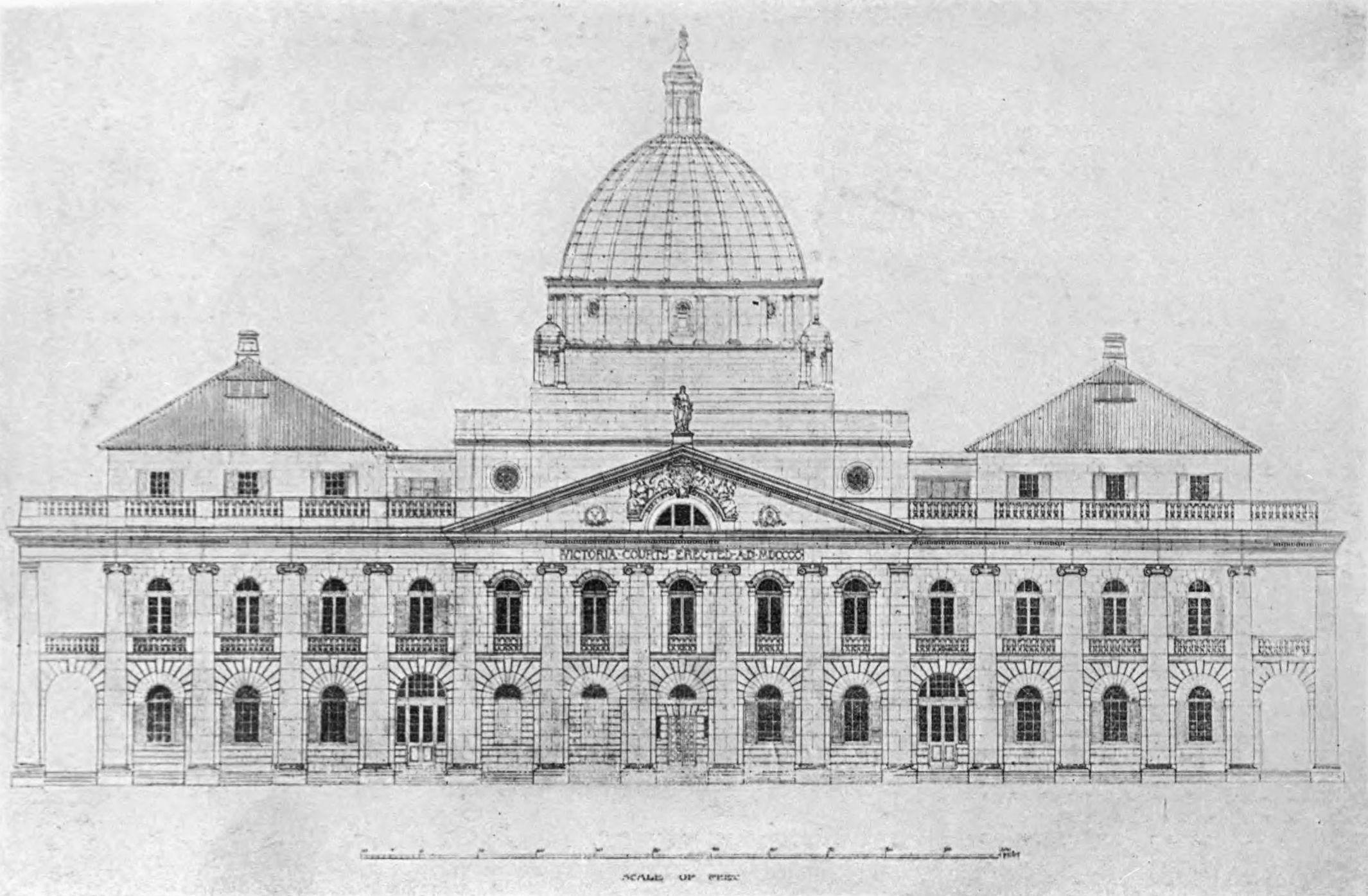
- Full case name: Hang Seng Credit Card Limited v Tsang Nga Lee, and nine other actions heard together
- Argued: 5 and 7 June 2000
- Decided: 10 July 2000
- Case numbers: HCA 13228/1999 and nine others
- Neutral citation: [2000] HKCFI 1503
- Citations: [2000] 3 HKLRD 33; [2000] 3 HKC 269
- Language: English
- Transcript: HKLII

Case history
- Prior actions: Master C. Chan, 16 December 1999: fixed costs awarded on default judgments

Court membership
- Judges sitting: Yam J (in chambers)

Case opinions
- A clause in a credit card agreement requiring the cardholder to pay, on a full indemnity basis, all costs and expenses of enforcement was unconscionable under the Unconscionable Contracts Ordinance and unenforceable; the card issuers were confined to fixed costs.
- Laws applied: Unconscionable Contracts Ordinance (Cap. 458), ss. 5–6; Rules of the High Court (Cap. 4A), O. 62; District Court Ordinance (Cap. 336), s. 40
- Keywords: Unconscionability; Credit cards; indemnity costs; consumer contracts; amicus curiae

Hang Seng Credit Card Ltd v Tsang Nga Lee [2000] 3 HKLRD 33 is a landmark decision of the Court of First Instance of Hong Kong in which Yam J held that a clause in a credit card agreement obliging a defaulting cardholder to pay, on a full indemnity basis, all costs and expenses incurred by the card issuer in enforcing the agreement was unconscionable under the Unconscionable Contracts Ordinance (Cap. 458), and therefore unenforceable. The decision disposed of ten undefended debt actions brought in the High Court by card issuers and banks, and the court decided the question of unconscionability although none of the defendants had taken part in the proceedings, hearing argument instead from an amicus curiae. It has since been regarded as an exceptional case in which the court declined to give effect to a contractual agreement as to costs.

The judgment also remarked on the high effective rates of interest charged by the plaintiffs and declined to follow an earlier decision permitting claims of small value to be pursued in the High Court rather than in the District Court. Within three months the Hong Kong Monetary Authority issued proposals, later incorporated into the Code of Banking Practice, under which costs indemnity clauses in banking agreements were to be limited to costs of a reasonable amount that had been reasonably incurred.

== Background ==
=== The Unconscionable Contracts Ordinance ===
The Unconscionable Contracts Ordinance was the result of the 1990 report of the Law Reform Commission of Hong Kong on the sale of goods and supply of services, which recommended that a provision modelled on section 52A of the Australian Trade Practices Act 1974 be adopted to control harsh or unconscionable terms in consumer contracts for the sale of goods and the supply of services. Among the examples the Commission gave of terms that might be considered harsh or unconscionable was "the provision providing for a defaulting borrower to indemnify the costs of obtaining judgment against him" in credit card agreements. It observed that such provisions were "unpopular with the High Court Masters", and that solicitors acting for card issuers often sued in the High Court even where the debt was well within the jurisdiction of the District Court, so that the costs which the debtor was ordered to pay on a full indemnity basis were inflated.

The Ordinance came into operation on 20 October 1995 and applies only to contracts made after that date. Section 5(1) provides that where, in a contract for the sale of goods or the supply of services in which one party deals as consumer, the court finds the contract or any part of it "to have been unconscionable in the circumstances relating to the contract at the time it was made", the court may refuse to enforce the contract, enforce the remainder without the unconscionable part, or limit, revise or alter that part so as to avoid an unconscionable result. By section 5(2), the burden of proving unconscionability lies on the party alleging it. The Ordinance does not define unconscionability; section 6(1) instead lists, without limitation, matters to which the court may have regard, namely the relative strengths of the parties' bargaining positions; whether the consumer was required to comply with conditions not reasonably necessary to protect the other party's legitimate interests; whether the consumer was able to understand the relevant documents; whether undue influence, pressure or unfair tactics were used; and the amount for which, and the circumstances in which, the consumer could have obtained identical or equivalent goods or services elsewhere.

=== Contractual costs and the court's discretion ===
In Hong Kong, as in England, the costs of High Court proceedings are in the discretion of the court under section 52A of the High Court Ordinance (Cap. 4) and Order 62 of the Rules of the High Court. Where the parties have agreed that costs are to be recovered on a particular basis, the court will ordinarily exercise its discretion so as to give effect to the agreement, but the contract cannot oust the discretion; the Court of Appeal had so held in Chekiang First Bank Ltd v Fong Siu Kin (1997), adopting the English decision in Gomba Holdings (UK) Ltd v Minories Finance Ltd (No 2). In an undefended action, the Rules of the High Court provide for modest fixed costs; in 2000 these were $1,550, against $1,380 in the District Court.

== Facts and procedural history ==
The ten actions, all commenced in the High Court in 1999, were brought by Hang Seng Credit Card Ltd, Hang Seng Bank Ltd, Standard Chartered Bank and Pacific Finance (Hong Kong) Ltd against individual cardholders for sums outstanding on their credit card accounts. (Note: The judgment refers in its opening paragraph to "three different plaintiffs", namely Hang Seng Credit Card Limited, Standard Chartered Bank and Pacific Finance (HK) Limited; the titles of the actions also name Hang Seng Bank Limited as plaintiff in three of them (HCA 15039, 15041 and 15044 of 1999).) None of the defendants defended, and default judgment was entered in each case. Each statement of claim pleaded a term of the card members' agreement under which the cardholder was responsible for "all costs and expenses including, without limitation, legal fees on a full indemnity basis" incurred by the issuer in enforcing the agreement or recovering sums owed. On 16 December 1999 Master C. Chan refused to give effect to that term and awarded the plaintiffs only the fixed costs prescribed by the Second Schedule to Order 62, holding that the plaintiffs were subject to an implied obligation to act reasonably in enforcing the agreement.

The plaintiffs appealed to the judge in chambers. At the first hearing, on 6 January 2000, only counsel for the plaintiffs appeared. Considering that "a point of law concerning public interest is involved", the court invited an amicus curiae to attend so that the issues could be fully argued. At the adjourned hearing on 5 and 7 June 2000, (Note: The judgment as handed down gave the dates of the adjourned hearing as "5 and 7 May 2000"; a corrigendum dated 15 August 2000 corrected them to 5 and 7 June 2000.) Paul Shieh appeared for the plaintiffs and Audrey Eu SC as amicus curiae; the defendants were absent. According to the Hong Kong Monetary Authority, the Consumer Council supplied information and assistance to the amicus.

The amount at stake in the lead action illustrates the issue. The plaintiff claimed $18,968.76, which the defendant had since paid in full; the costs of an undefended High Court action taxed on an indemnity basis, according to information supplied to the court by the Registrar, ranged between $25,000 and $32,000.

== Judgment ==
Yam J dismissed the appeals. He framed the principal question as whether the costs provision was unreasonable, as the Master had held, or, as the amicus contended, unconscionable and so unenforceable under the Ordinance.

=== Costs provisions and the court's discretion ===
The judge accepted that a contractual provision for indemnity costs is not in itself contrary to public policy, and that the court will "in normal course of events" give effect to it. Because the contract cannot override the court's discretion as to costs, however, the court was entitled to "look at all the circumstances of the case in the exercise of its discretion and in particular, the provisions in the UCO". None of the authorities on contractual costs had concerned the Ordinance, and several had been decided before it came into force.

=== Application of the Ordinance ===
Counsel for the plaintiffs and the amicus agreed that a credit card agreement is a contract for the supply of services, so that the Ordinance applied. On the burden of proof, Yam J held that although section 5(2) placed the onus on the defendants, the court was not thereby precluded from raising unconscionability where a defendant failed to appear: "It does not mean, however, that when a defendant fails to appear, the issue cannot be raised." The court could consider all available circumstances, particularly where the relevant matters were not specific to an individual consumer, applied generally and were not in dispute.

=== Unconscionability of the costs provision ===
Applying the matters listed in section 6, the judge identified four considerations.

- Bargaining position. The card issuers were in a much stronger bargaining position. The agreements were standard forms drafted in the issuers' interest without negotiation or consultation, "leaving no choice to the consumer at all".
- Understanding. Relying on a survey published by the Consumer Council in its magazine Choice, the judge found that issuers did not draw this type of provision to applicants' attention in the application form, and that there was no control over the size of type or the language of the terms. The Hang Seng pleadings alleged only that the cardholder had acknowledged reading and agreeing to the terms, not that a copy had been supplied or the clause explained, and the application form suggested that the terms had to be requested; the other plaintiffs' forms referred to terms "in force from time to time".
- Alternative sources. A Consumer Council survey of the sixteen credit cards most commonly used in Hong Kong had found that all contained some form of costs reimbursement term. In the judge's words, "the consumer has no real choice. Services are supplied on a take it or leave it basis."
- Meaning and effect. The provisions were "extremely wide". Standard Chartered's extended to all costs directly or indirectly incurred in collecting or attempting to collect the debt, including the charges of debt collectors; Hang Seng Bank's included sums paid to debt collectors; and Pacific Finance's included administrative costs.

Counsel for the plaintiffs submitted that the Master had erred in implying a term that the issuers must act reasonably. Yam J accepted the amicus's answer that it was precisely because no such limitation existed that the provision was unconscionable: an issuer could use associated companies to generate charges, engage the most expensive debt collector or adviser, and continue to incur expenses without any upper limit. Debt collection charges, according to a further Consumer Council study, could amount to 25 to 30 per cent of the debt; and the provision enabled issuers to sue in the High Court without regard to the cost, although the claims lay within the jurisdiction of the District Court and, from 19 October 1999, of the Small Claims Tribunal.

The judge rejected the suggestion that the difficulty could be met by ordering taxation on the District Court scale. Unconscionability, he held, is judged at the time the contract was made, and a later, voluntary waiver of part of the entitlement does not alter the meaning or effect of the clause, which in its ordinary meaning extended to all costs and expenses, even those unreasonably incurred: "It just leaves the consumer to the mercy of the other party." He concluded that the costs provision was unconscionable, noting that such clauses were among the mischiefs that had led to the enactment of the Ordinance, and stated that in applying it "the court is not shackled by the traditional or classic theories in contract law".

=== Relief ===
Since the defendants had brought no counterclaim, the judge declined to grant declaratory relief and instead allowed the Master's order to stand, so that the plaintiffs recovered only the fixed costs prescribed for undefended actions. He considered that result fair having regard to the provision for fixed costs in the rules, the small sums involved, the delay and further expense that taxation would entail, the routine nature of the proceedings, and the plaintiffs' failure to plead particulars of the costs they claimed. On the last point, he held that legal costs claimed as damages under such a clause are special damage and must be particularised, so that a defendant may know the amount before deciding whether to defend, and the court may decide how costs should be assessed.

=== Interest rates ===
The judge further observed that the interest charged was "extortionate". In two of the Pacific Finance actions, the effective rates were 53.69 and 59.65 per cent per annum, figures which exceeded the 48 per cent threshold at which the Money Lenders Ordinance (Cap. 163) presumes a transaction to be extortionate and approached the 60 per cent rate at which lending is an offence and the agreement unenforceable. (Note: The judgment attributes both the presumption and the offence to section 25 of the Money Lenders Ordinance. In the Ordinance as then in force, the offence of lending at an effective rate exceeding 60 per cent per annum, and the unenforceability of such an agreement, are in section 24(1)–(2); the presumption that a rate exceeding 48 per cent is extortionate is in section 25(3).) Because the plaintiffs were authorised institutions under the supervision of the Monetary Authority, the Money Lenders Ordinance did not apply to them, and their rates were not otherwise controlled. The level of interest was, in the judge's view, a further factor supporting the conclusion that the costs provision was unconscionable; but he expressly declined to decide whether the rates were unconscionable in themselves.

=== Choice of court ===
Finally, the judge considered the plaintiffs' practice of suing in the High Court on claims within the jurisdiction of the District Court. In Inchape Hong Kong Ltd v Performa (Asia) Ltd [1992] 2 HKC 364, Jones J had held that a plaintiff was entitled to do so, and that a master could not transfer such proceedings to the District Court of his own motion for administrative convenience. Yam J noted that Inchape had been decided without adversarial argument. Counsel agreed that a master had power to transfer under section 40 of the District Court Ordinance, and that Order 25, rule 3 did not confine the exercise of the power to the summons for directions. The amicus submitted that "[u]nless there are very good reasons to the contrary, cases within the District Court jurisdiction ought to be commenced in or transferred to the District Court", giving as an example of a good reason a connection with other proceedings in the High Court. Information obtained from the Registrar showed that undefended proceedings were not, as had been said in Inchape, cheaper or faster in the High Court. Yam J held that Inchape should not be followed.

=== Orders ===
The judge dismissed the appeals, making an order nisi of no order as to the costs of the appeal because the defendants were neither present nor represented. He stated his conclusions that the costs provision was unconscionable under the Ordinance and unenforceable; that all cases within the jurisdiction of the District Court should be transferred there by an order nisi of the master shortly after the action was commenced in the Court of First Instance; and that the plaintiffs were entitled only to fixed costs under Order 62, rule 32 and Part I of the Second Schedule.

== Aftermath ==
=== Banking practice ===
On 4 October 2000 the Monetary Authority published, for consultation with the banking industry and the Consumer Council, proposals prepared by an informal working group reviewing the Code of Banking Practice. The working group, which comprised representatives of the Hong Kong Association of Banks and the Deposit Taking Companies Association, stated that it had accelerated its consideration of credit card practices in view of increasing public concern. Its paper took the ruling of the Court of First Instance and a Consumer Council survey published in August 2000 as its starting points, summarising the court's reasoning in five propositions. The Monetary Authority's Executive Director (Banking Policy), Simon Topping, said that "it has become very clear that there is scope for improving the credit card practices of authorised institutions".

The proposals responded directly to the judgment. Any costs indemnity provision was to provide only for the recovery of costs and expenses "which are of reasonable amount and were reasonably incurred"; institutions were to bring legal proceedings "in the appropriate court"; a cardholder's liability to indemnify the issuer for costs reasonably incurred in recovering a debt was to be highlighted in the application form; a copy of the terms was to be provided on request; and, although authorised institutions remained exempt from the Money Lenders Ordinance, the annualised percentage rate on credit card lending was not, except under exceptional monetary conditions, to exceed the 60 per cent limit stated in that Ordinance. The Consumer Council described the recommendations as "a welcome and prompt response to the recent ruling", while noting that they applied only to institutions under the Monetary Authority's jurisdiction.

The recommendations were carried into the results of the first comprehensive review of the Code of Banking Practice, published in November 2001, whose recommended practices on card services were stated to be "aimed at addressing the issues highlighted by the Court of First Instance in its ruling on 10 July 2000" and by the Consumer Council's survey. Among the major improvements to the Code was the provision that any cost indemnity provision in the terms and conditions "should only provide for the recovery of costs and expenses which are of reasonable amount and were reasonably incurred".

=== Judicial treatment ===
Later decisions have treated the case principally as an instance of the exception to the rule that the court will give effect to an agreement as to costs. In Yeung Kwok Fan v Standard Chartered Bank (2001), Deputy High Court Judge McCoy SC described Yam J as having followed Chekiang First Bank while distinguishing it in the result, and stated that the court would depart from a contractual provision for costs only in an exceptional case, such as where there was "proof of unconscionability as in Hang Seng Credit Card". (Note: In summarising the factors found in Hang Seng Credit Card, the judgment in Yeung Kwok Fan states that the defendants "could have acquired the identical service from a person other than the plaintiff". Yam J's finding on that factor was that "the consumer has no real choice".) Courts have since cited the decision for the general principle that costs agreements are normally enforced, and have distinguished it where the agreement in question was not shown to be unconscionable.

The decision has also been distinguished on the terms of the clause. In Citibank (Hong Kong) Ltd v Au Wai Lun (2006), the District Court found a credit card agreement not unconscionable, observing that, "unlike" the clause in Hang Seng Credit Card, it entitled the issuer only to reasonable fees and expenses reasonably incurred, subject to a ceiling of 30 per cent of the original outstanding amount. It has been cited as a case in which it was common ground that the Ordinance applies to contracts for the provision of credit facilities, for the factors relevant to unconscionability under section 6, and for the requirement that legal costs claimed as damages be particularised as special damage. Its guidance on the transfer of proceedings to the District Court was applied in Wu Yi Development Co Ltd v Big Island Construction (HK) Ltd (2007), where the court observed that the judgment had been given soon after an increase in the District Court's jurisdiction, when many actions begun in the Court of First Instance had come to fall within it, and treated a connection with pending High Court proceedings as a good reason for transfer in the other direction.

The Court of Appeal has declined to extend the decision beyond its context. In Easy Fortune Property Ltd v Yung Chun Him (2019), a borrower from a licensed money lender relied on it in support of arguments that a collection fee provision contravened the Money Lenders Ordinance. Chu JA, giving the judgment of the court, described the case as concerning whether a costs provision was unreasonable and contravened the Unconscionable Contracts Ordinance, and held that it did not advance arguments on the scope of the Money Lenders Ordinance.

== See also ==
- Unconscionability
- Standard form contract
- Law of Hong Kong
