= Louth v Diprose =

Judgement of the High Court of Australia

- Court: High Court of Australia
- Citations: [1992] HCA 61, (1992) 175 CLR 621

Case history
- Prior actions: Diprose v Louth (No.1) (1990) 54 SASR 438, Supreme Court (SA); Diprose v. Louth (No.2) (1990) 54 SASR 450, Supreme Court (Full Court) (SA)

Court membership
- Judges sitting: Mason CJ, Brennan, Deane, Dawson Toohey, Gaudron & McHugh JJ

Case opinions
- The transaction is unconscionable, as emotional dependence or attachment is a special disability whereby taking advantage of the dependent constitutes unconscionable conduct. The conduct of defendant (appellant), knowing the plaintiff's infatuation and the defendant's manipulation of it so that he was "unable to make a worthwhile judgment as to what is in his best interest", affirming King CJ (Diprose v Louth (No. 1) (1990) 54 SASR 438, at p 448), was "dishonest and smacked of fraud" (6:1) (per Mason JJ, Brennan, Dean, Dawson, Gaudron, McHugh JJ; Toohey J dissenting).

Keywords
- Unconscionable conduct, unconscientious dealing, undue influence, undue weakness

Louth v Diprose, is an Australian contract law and equity case, in which unconscionable conduct is considered.

== Facts ==
Solicitor Louis Donald Diprose (the plaintiff/respondent) was infatuated with Carol Mary Louth (the defendant/appellant), whom he had met in Launceston, Tasmania in 1981. He showered her with gifts and, at one time, proposed to her; she, however, refused. Subsequently in 1985 the defendant informed the plaintiff that she was depressed and was going to be evicted and, if this happened, she would commit suicide (this was largely untrue). In response, the plaintiff agreed to buy her a house and, at her insistence, put it in her name. In 1988 when their relationship deteriorated, the plaintiff asked the defendant to transfer the house into his name. She refused and he brought proceedings seeking to recover the house.

At the trial in the Supreme Court of South Australia, the court of first instance, the plaintiff won, with King CJ holding that for the defendant to retain the house and land would be unconscionable and thus the plaintiff was beneficially entitled to the land. The defendant subsequently appealed to the Full Court of South Australia again, however, the defendant lost on appeal, with Jacobs ACJ and Legoe J forming the majority and Matheson J dissenting. The defendant then filed special leave for an appeal to the High Court of Australia, which was granted.

== Judgment ==
The appeal was dismissed. The property in Tranmere, South Australia, which was purchased by the plaintiff but placed in the name of the defendant, remained recovered from the defendant to the plaintiff.

== Impact ==
Louth v Diprose remains an important case in Australian contract law and equity and extending the scope of unconscionable conduct, from Commercial Bank of Australia Ltd v Amadio. Accordingly, it is taught in most, if not all, Australian law schools as part of introductory, substantive contracts, and substantive equity classes.

Furthermore, Louth v Diprose has been studied in academia. The purportedly limited presentation of the appellant's case has been noted.
