= Tilden Rent-A-Car Co v Clendenning =

Canadian lawsuit

Tilden Rent-A-Car Co. v. Clendenning (1978), 83 DLR (3d) 400 is a leading Canadian contract law decision from the Court of Appeal for Ontario on standard form contracts. The Court held that a party can only be bound to a signed standard form contract when it is reasonable to believe that they consented to the terms.

== Background ==
Clendenning rented a car from Tilden Rent-A-Car, a Canadian car rental company. He signed the rental agreement which contained an exclusion clause denying coverage for accidents that occur if the driver had consumed any alcohol. Later, Clendenning hit a pole after having consumed alcohol. He pleaded guilty to impaired driving and tried to collect from the insurance policy to pay for the damages of his accident.

== Opinion of the Court ==
Justice Charles Dubin, for the court, held that Clendenning could collect from the insurance. Dubin observed that:

In modern commercial practice, many standard form printed documents are signed without being read or understood. In many cases the parties seeking to rely upon the terms of the contract know or ought to know that the signature of a party to the contract does not represent the true intention of the signer, and that the party signing is unaware of the stringent and onerous provisions which the standard form contains. Under such circumstances, I am of the opinion that the party seeking to rely on such terms should not be able to do so in the absence of first having taken reasonable measures to draw such terms to the attention of the other party, and, in the absence of such reasonable measures, it is not necessary for the party denying knowledge of such terms to prove either fraud, misrepresentation or non est factum.

Normally, a customer would have time to consider the whole agreement. But in this particular situation, renters are typically in a rush and do not normally have a chance to read the terms of the agreement. The judge observed that the rental system is designed to be speedy and, therefore, lengthy and onerous terms cannot assumed to be assented to.

== See also ==
- Boilerplate contract
