= Uber Technologies Inc v Heller =

- Supreme Court of Canada

Hearing: November 6, 2019 Judgment: June 26, 2020
- Full case name: Uber Technologies Inc, Uber Canada, Inc, Uber BV and Rasier Operations BV v David Heller
- Citations: 2020 SCC 16
- Docket No.: 38534
- Prior history: 2019 ONCA 1 (judgment for Heller); 2018 ONSC 718 (judgment for Uber)
- Ruling: Appeal dismissed

Holding
- Arbitration clause in contract between Heller and Uber unconscionable

Court membership
- Chief Justice: Richard Wagner; Puisne Justices: Rosalie Abella, Michael Moldaver, Andromache Karakatsanis, Suzanne Côté, Russell Brown, Malcolm Rowe, Sheilah Martin, Nicholas Kasirer

Reasons given
- Majority: Abella and Rowe JJ (Wagner CJ and Moldaver, Karakatsanis, Martin and Kasirer JJ concurring)
- Concurrence: Brown J
- Dissent: Côté J

Uber Technologies Inc v Heller, 2020 SCC 16, is a 2020 decision of the Supreme Court of Canada. The Court held 8–1 that an arbitration clause in a contract the plaintiff David Heller had signed with Uber was unconscionable, and hence unenforceable. As a result, it held that Heller's proposed class action lawsuit against Uber could go forward.

== Facts ==
David Heller, an Uber Eats driver, claimed the right to be paid the minimum wage of CA$14 an hour, overtime and vacation pay under Ontario's Employment Standards Act along with other colleagues in a class action. To have these rights, Heller and others needed to be classified as "employees". Heller had a standard form contract with Uber, which stated that he was an independent contractor, and that any dispute needed to go to arbitration in the Netherlands, according to the rules of the International Chamber of Commerce. This would have cost around US$14,500. The claims of the class as a whole totalled approximately CA$400 million. Heller argued that the arbitration clause was not binding, and voidable because it was unconscionable based on the unequal bargaining power between him and other drivers and Uber. Uber contended that its contract should be enforced, no matter what its terms.

== Judgment ==
=== Lower courts ===
Uber brought a motion to stay Heller's class action pending resolution of arbitration in the Netherlands. The Ontario Superior Court of Justice, the court of first instance in the action, granted the stay.

The Court of Appeal for Ontario reversed the motion judge's decision, holding that the contract which purported to require arbitration was unconscionable. According to Peter Quon, the Court of Appeal's decision was the first in which a Canadian court had found an arbitration clause unconscionable.

=== Supreme Court ===
In an 8–1 decision, the Supreme Court of Canada held that the arbitration clause in Heller's contract with Uber was unconscionable. Further, the majority held that the contract was void because it attempted to contract out of the Employment Standards Act. As a result, the Court allowed Heller's class action lawsuit against Uber to proceed to trial.

Justice Russell Brown, in a concurring opinion, argued that the arbitration clause was unenforceable because it effectively denied Heller access to justice and was therefore contrary to public policy. Justice Suzanne Côté dissented alone, arguing that the majority was setting a standard "so low as to be practically meaningless in the case of standard form contracts".

Uber Technologies did not settle the question of whether Heller and other members of the proposed class were, in fact, employees. Rather, it established only that the arbitration clause in Heller's contract with Uber was unenforceable in Ontario, and that Heller could pursue his complaint against Uber in Ontario courts.

== Significance ==
Uber reacted by saying it would amend its contracts to align with the court’s principles, and that: “Going forward, dispute resolution will be more accessible to drivers, bringing Uber Canada closer in line with other jurisdictions".

According to Michael Geist, a professor at the University of Ottawa Faculty of Law, Uber Technologies will influence the use of arbitration clauses in online contracts generally. Professor Jassmine Girgis of the University of Calgary Faculty of Law argued that the version of the doctrine of unconscionability adopted in Uber Technologies is too expansive, and does not provide sufficient guidance to lower courts. Professor Marcus Moore, from the Peter A. Allard School of Law, argues that the discussion of unconscionability that emerges in the Uber Technologies case attempts to tackle two types of contracts: those general contracts where one party is exploiting a special impairment in the other party, and specifically standard-form contracts. This crude approach, he argues, leads to the development of a doctrine that is no longer intelligible as about unconscionability an unconscientious abuse of power, and will likely prove to be of limited use.

Professor Alan Bogg of the University of Bristol, calling Uber Technologies a "momentous victory" for Heller, suggested that the decision "represents a powerful countermovement against the use of arbitration clauses in employment contracts". Assistant Professor Tamar Meshel of the University of Alberta Faculty of Law argued that the decision may have implications "for arbitration agreements contained in international contracts—particularly standard form contracts—that might give rise to employment disputes, such as those in the gig economy, or that contain terms that may seem to bar a party’s access to the arbitral process".
