= Downtown Eatery (1993) v Ontario =

Case brought to the Court of Appeal for Ontario

Downtown Eatery (1993) Ltd. v Ontario
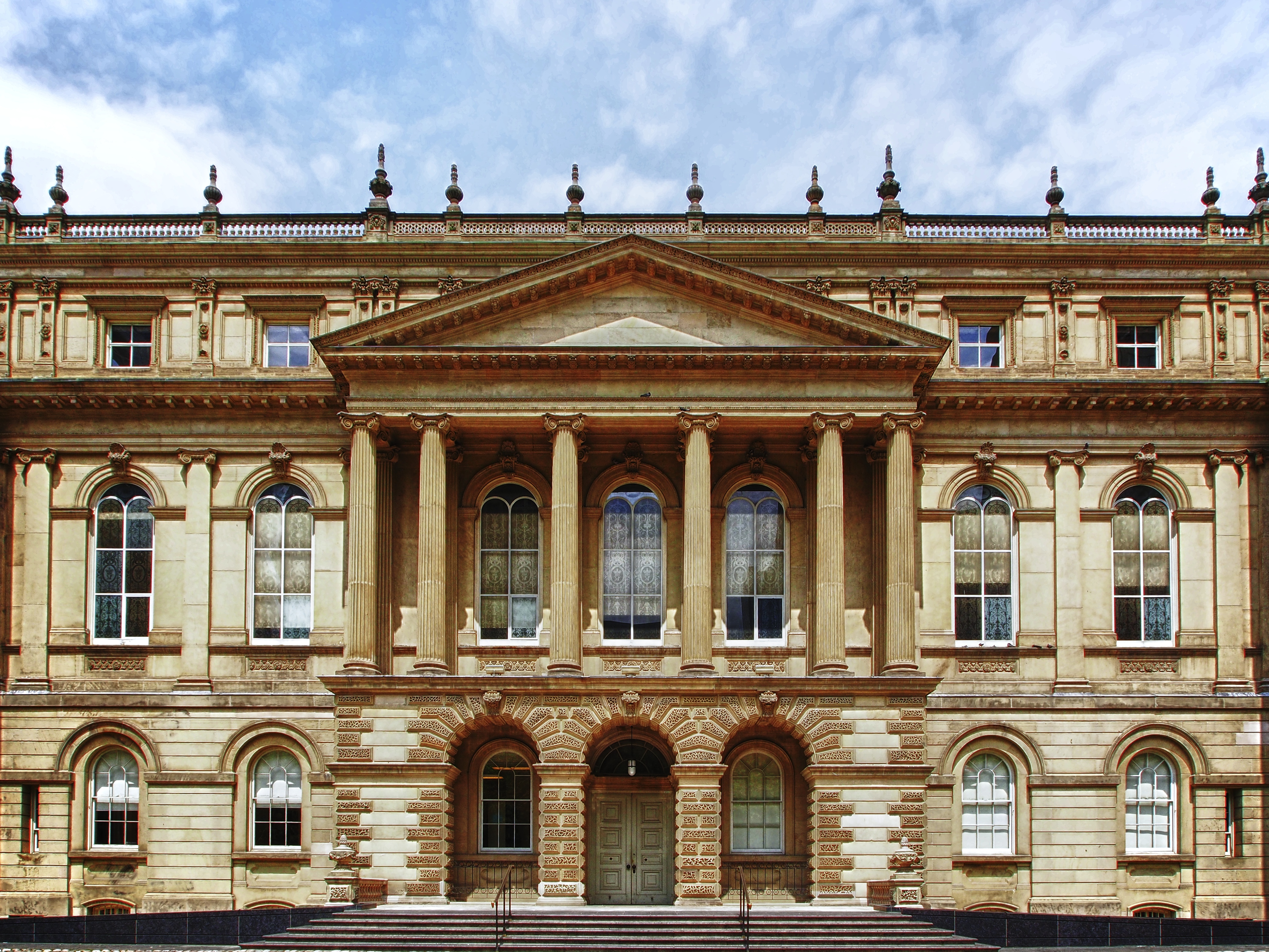
- Court: Court of Appeal for Ontario
- Full case name: Downtown Eatery (1993) Ltd. v. Her Majesty the Queen in Right of Ontario et al. Alouche v. Landing Strip Inc. et al.
- Decided: 22 May 2001

Case history
- Appealed from: Ontario Superior Court
- Subsequent action: Leave to appeal the decision at the Supreme Court of Canada was dismissed

Court membership
- Judges sitting: Roy McMurtry; Stephen Borins; James C. MacPherson

Downtown Eatery (1993) v Ontario was a case brought to the Court of Appeal for Ontario pertaining to the structure of business hierarchies and relationships as a form of creditor proofing business assets, and specifically the common employer doctrine. It considered the oppression remedy of the Business Corporations Act.

In January 2002, an application for leave to appeal the decision at the Supreme Court of Canada was dismissed.

== Background ==
In December 1992, Joseph Alouche was hired as manager for a strip club in Toronto named For Your Eyes Only on King Street West. The strip club was owned by Herman Grad and Ben Grosman, who also owned the nightclub The Landing Strip on Carlingview Drive. The contract stipulated that Alouche would receive the health care and insurance benefits from an unnamed sister organization. His paycheques were sent by Best Beaver Management Inc., a company also owned by Grad and Grosman.

The ownership structure of For Your Eyes Only was complex. The premises in which it operated was owned by Twin Peaks Inc., which leased it to The Landing Strip Inc.. The latter company held the liquor licence and adult entertainment licence as well as the trademark for For Your Eyes Only. The chattel and equipment was owned by Downtown Eatery Limited, which operated the strip club on licence from The Landing Strip Inc.. Employees were paid by Best Beaver Management Inc.. All these companies were owned by holding companies Bengro Corp. and Harrad Corp., owned by Grosman and Grad respectively.

In May 1993, For Your Eyes Only sent Alouche a Notice of Discipline, and fired him in June 1993. He sued Best Beaver Management Inc. in October 1993 for wrongful dismissal, naming that company the defendant because it was the company issuing his paycheques. Grad represented the company during the trial. In the case judgement, judge Festeryga ruled in favour of Alouche, awarding damages, costs, and interest totalling $83,902.91 (equivalent to $154,970 in 2025).

Best Beaver Management Inc. did not pay Alouche. Two provincial sheriffs were dispatched to For Your Eyes Only to execute the judgement, where they seized $1,855. In response, Downtown Eatery (1993) Ltd. filed a lawsuit against Alouche, stating that the money was its possession. Alouche defended against the lawsuit, and counterclaimed against Grad, Grosman, and all companies they controlled on the grounds of common employer doctrine, the oppression remedy of the Ontario Business Corporations Act, and fraudulent conveyance.

In February 2000, judge C. Campbell at the Ontario Superior Court of Justice heard the case, and a judgement rendered on 3 March 2000. The judge wholly dismissed the counterclaim. The common employer doctrine claim was dismissed both for merit and on estoppel, the latter because such a claim was not raised in the original wrongful dismissal action. Relief via the oppression remedy was dismissed as inappropriate, as the judge deemed that the reorganization of companies owned by Grad and Grosman was "not undertaken for the purpose of depriving Alouche of recovery of his judgment against Best Beaver". The request for a tracing order was similarly denied, as the judge deemed that Grad and Grosman had not undertaken a fraudulent conveyance.

== Judgement ==
The judgement of the court was delivered by Borins and MacPherson, who cited the common employer doctrine that had been considered in its common law context in several Canadian court cases. Specifically cited was the judgement in the case of Sinclair v. Dover Engineering Services Ltd. (1987) at the Supreme Court of British Columbia, in which judge Wood found that:

As long as there exists a sufficient degree of relationship between the different legal entities who apparently compete for the role of employer, there is no reason in law or in equity why they ought not all to be regarded as one for the purpose of determining liability for obligations owed to those employees who, in effect, have served all without regard for any precise notion of to whom they were bound in contract. What will constitute a sufficient degree of relationship will depend, in each case, on the details of such relationship, including such factors as individual shareholdings, corporate shareholdings, and interlocking directorships. The essence of that relationship will be the element of common control.

— judge Wood, Sinclair v. Dover Engr. Services Ltd., 1987

In the introduction to the judgement, Borins and MacPherson stated that the common employer doctrine has "a well-recognized statutory pedigree" in Canada, such as the Ontario Employment Standards Act which regards related businesses as one employer with respect to safeguarding employee entitlements.

Borins and MacPherson stated that "an employer is entitled to establish complex corporate structures and relationships", but that the "permissible complexity in corporate arrangements does not work an injustice in the realm of employment law". In particular, the term "employer" should recognize "the complexity of modern corporate structures" without revoking or denying "legitimate entitlements of wrongfully dismissed employees". The judgement also stated that a contract by itself cannot be determinative of an employer-employee relationship, as this would allow employers to evade responsibility to employees by establishing shell companies with no assets.

The conclusion stated that the "consortium of Grad and Grosman companies which operated For Your Eyes Only" was the true employer of Alouche at the time of his dismissal in June 1993. This group of companies was deemed to have "functioned as a single, integrated unit in relation to the operation of For Your Eyes Only". Moreover, the business reorganizations that occurred in September 1993 and May 1996 should be considered in the enforcement of the original judgement, as without the wrongful dismissal, Alouche would have been an employee of the restructured business.

The asset distribution resultant from the business reorganization was deemed to be oppressive conduct by Grad and Grosman. The judgment stated that:

It was the reasonable expectation of Alouche that Grad and Grosman, in terminating the operations of Best Beaver and leaving it without assets to respond to a possible judgment, should have retained a reserve to meet the very contingency that resulted. In failing to do so, the benefit to Grad and Grosman, as the shareholders and sole controlling owners of this small, closely held company, is clear. By diverting the accumulated profits of Best Beaver to other companies that they owned, they were able to insulate these funds from being available to satisfy Alouche's judgment.

— Downtown Eatery (1993) Ltd. v. Ontario

In particular, it was stated that bad faith is not necessary for a plaintiff to seek redress via the oppression remedy, but rather the fact that the plaintiff was unable to collect judgement from the initial defendant as a result of the business reorganization.

The disposition entitled Alouche to the original award of $83,902.91 in addition to all accrued interest from that trial date until payment of the judgement was satisfied, as well as the costs of the second trial and the appeal.

== Legacy ==
The conclusion of the Court of Appeal was reaffirmed in subsequent rulings, including Jakl v. Russell Tire & Automotive Centre (1990) Inc. in 2005 and King v. 1416088 Ontario Ltd. in 2014.

In a 2005 article in Canadian HR Reporter, Stuart Rudner stated that Downtown Eatery (1993) v. Ontario was the "leading case with respect to the issue of common employers" in Canada.

As of September 2015 it has been judicially considered in 37 cases throughout Canada, primarily for its use of the oppression remedy provisions of the Business Corporations Act.

The case has also been cited in later court decisions as an example of piercing the corporate veil to determine who is "acting in the capacity of employer vis-a-vis the employees".
