= Commercial Bank of Australia Ltd v Amadio =

Judgement of the High Court of Australia

- Court: High Court of Australia
- Decided: 12 May 1983
- Citations: [1983] HCA 14, (1983) 151 CLR 447

Case history
- Prior actions: Amadio v Commercial Bank of Australia Ltd [1981] SASC 5303, Supreme Court (SA); Amadio v Commercial Bank of Australia Ltd (1981) 95 LSJS 419, Supreme Court (Full Court) (SA)

Court membership
- Judges sitting: Gibbs CJ, Mason, Wilson, Deane & Dawson JJ

Commercial Bank of Australia Ltd v Amadio, is a seminal case in Australian contract law and equity, in which the High Court held that unconscionable dealing due to a lack of knowledge or education and the consequent imbalance in bargaining power could lead to a transaction being set aside.

The case is a formative case for the defence of unconscionability, a precursor to statutory unconscionability.

== Background ==
=== Facts ===
Giovanni and Cesira Amadio, whose son, Vincenzo, carried on business as a builder, guaranteed their son's indebtedness to the Commercial Bank of Australia. To this end, they executed certain documents the effect of which was to provide the bank with a mortgage over a building which they owned. When the son's business failed, the bank sought to enforce the guarantee. In their defence, the Amadios asserted that the guarantee was unenforceable because it was unconscionable. They were held to be at a "special disadvantage" as an equitable doctrine in Equity. With unconscionable conduct having no definition at a legislative level (other than conduct lacking in good faith) it is largely up to the presiding judicial member to determine as to whether compliance is efficient on a statutory basis.

=== Supreme Court ===
The Amadios commenced proceedings in the Supreme Court of South Australia seeking to set aside the mortgage and guarantee. In relation to the claim that there was an unconscionable bargain and the claim that the bargain was procured by undue influence, Wells J delivered an ex tempore judgment in favour of the bank, holding that there was nothing to suggest to the bank officers that the Amadios did not understand the guarantee or the financial predicament of the son's company. The son had spoken to his parents in Italian, in the presence of the bank officers, giving the bank officers the impression that the Amadios understood the guarantee and financial indebtedness of his company. In fact, the son had withheld the key information from his parents to try to maintain the appearance of success. Wells J held that the transaction was "an ordinary one, struck in the usual and regular course of commerce" and that the bank "was under no legal or moral duty to acquaint themselves with the underlying facts". His Honour held that any hardship, or inequality of bargaining power, was unknown to the bank and the transaction was not unconscionable. Wells J concluded with these remarks: "where one or other of the parties... have to suffer severe loss in the judgment,... it always makes me a little sad that some sort of arrangement could not have been come to, to soften the effects of such a judgment."

=== Full Court of the Supreme Court ===
The Amadios appealed to the Full Court of the Supreme Court. The Full Court, King CJ, Zelling and Jacobs JJ, held that the bank knew that the son's financial position was desperate, the bank had collaborated with the son to conceal his true position from his creditors and the bank had an obvious pecuniary interest to obtain better security for the repayment of the money it had already lent. The Full Court held that the silence from the bank in these circumstances meant the transaction was unconscionable and it was set aside.

== Judgment ==
It was held by the High Court of Australia in 4–1 majority that, in all the circumstances, it was unconscionable for the bank to rely on the guarantee. Notable circumstances taken into the account by the court include:

1. The Amadios had a limited understanding of English.
2. The Amadios did not have the benefit of independent advice, and such advice was not provided or suggested by the bank.
3. When the mortgage was executed the bank was aware of the Amadios' son's financial situation and knew the Amadios were not so apprised.
4. The bank did not advise the Amadios that there was no limit on their liability under the guarantee - the Amadios believed the liability was limited to $50,000.

=== Majority opinion ===
Justice Mason noted: "Relief on the ground of unconscionable conduct will be granted when unconscientious advantage is taken of an innocent party whose will is overborne so that it is not independent and voluntary, just as it will also be granted when such advantage is taken of an innocent party who though not deprived of an independent and voluntary will, is unable to make a worthwhile judgment as to what is in his best interests (at 462)."

In cases of proven unconscionability, the courts will set aside the contract or refuse to make an order for specific performance of it. As will be seen, if the unconscionable conduct constitutes a breach of statutory law, broader remedies (including damages) may be available.

Chief Justice Gibbs stated that "The appellant should in my opinion fail only because of its failure to disclose to the respondents matters which it ought to have disclosed" which is that the guarantee was precarious with the state of the bank account of the son at the time he arranged for his parents to place their property in guarantee, and the very close working relationship between the bank and the son, and that the parents thought that the limit of their liability was only $50,000, not the full value of their investment property (being of the order of $200,000).

The judgment of Deane J, was referred to by other judges. He said, "In the present case ... it was ... evident to the bank that Mr. and Mrs. Amadio stood in need of advice as to the nature and effect of the transaction into which they were entering. It is apparent that any such advice would have included the importance to a guarantor of ascertaining from the bank the state of the customer's account which was being guaranteed and any unusual features of the account. If such information had been obtained by Mr. and Mrs. Amadio, they would not, on the evidence and in the light of the learned trial judge's finding, have entered into the guarantee/mortgage at all. The whole transaction should properly be seen as flowing from the special disability which was evident to the bank and as being unfair, unjust and unreasonable." The customer's account stated here is that of their son who brought the bank guarantee documents to his parents. The bank knew of the poor state of the son's business accounts, and the bank and the son had a history of closely linked business relations with each other. Wilson J agreed with Deane J.

=== Dissenting opinion ===
Dawson J delivered a dissenting judgment in which he said, "it is my view that the appellant bank was not guilty of any non-disclosure amounting to a breach of duty on its part" and that the facts did not point to the Amadios having been disadvantaged and that, therefore, the bank was not guilty of either unconscionable conduct or misrepresentation.
