= Model release =

Release of legal rights of photograph

A model release, known in similar contexts as a liability waiver, is a legal release typically signed by the subject of a photograph granting permission to publish the photograph in one form or another. The legal rights of the signatories in reference to the material are thereafter subject to the allowances and restrictions stated in the release, and also possibly in exchange for compensation paid to the photographed person. A model release is not needed for most photograph publication because of freedom of speech rights (which vary by country.) A model release is needed for publication where personality rights or privacy rights would otherwise be infringed. No release is required for publication, as news, of a photo taken of an identifiable person when the person is in a public place. In general, no release is required for publication of a photo taken of an identifiable person when the person is in a public space unless the use is for trade or direct commercial use, which is defined as promoting a product, service, or idea. Publication of a photo of an identifiable person, even if taken when the person is in a public place, that implies endorsement, without a model release signed by that person, can result in civil liability for whoever publishes the photograph.

No model release is necessary to take a photograph. Rather, the model release applies to potential publication of the photograph. Liability rests solely with the publisher, except under special conditions. The photographer is typically not the publisher of the photograph, but normally licenses the photograph to someone else to publish. It is typical for the photographer to obtain the model release not merely because they are present at the time and can get it, but also because it gives them more opportunity to license the photograph later to a party who wishes to publish it.

The topic of model release forms and liability waivers is a legal area related to privacy that is separate from copyright. Also, the need for model releases pertains to public use of the photos: i.e., publishing them commercially. The act of taking a photo of someone in a public setting without a model release, or of viewing or non-commercially showing such a photo in private, generally does not create legal liability, at least in the United States.

The legal issues surrounding model releases are complex and vary by jurisdiction. Although the risk to photographers is virtually nil (so long as proper disclosures of the existence of a release, and its content is made to whoever licenses the photo for publication), the business need for having releases rises substantially if the main source of income from the photographer's work lies within industries that would require them (such as advertising). In short, photojournalists almost never need to obtain model releases for images they shoot for (or sell to) news or qualified editorial publications.

Photographers who also publish images may need releases to protect themselves, but there is a distinction between making an image available for sale (even via a website), which is not considered publication in a form that would require a release, and the use of the same image to promote a product or service in a way that would require a release.

== Types of release ==
- Adult release: This is the form most commonly referred to as a "model release". The language of this release is normally intended for use by models over the age of majority.
- Minor release: This variant of the model release contains language referring to the model (who is a minor) in the third-person, and required signature by a parent or other legal guardian of the model. A release which is not signed by a parent or guardian may afford no legal protection to the publisher.
- Group release: This is a modified version of the adult release, which includes additional signature lines to accommodate use by multiple models or subjects in a single image.

== See also ==
- Personality rights
