= Australian contract law =

The law of contract in Australia is similar to the contract law of other Anglo-American common law jurisdictions, but differences from other jurisdictions have arisen over time because of statute law and divergent development of common law in the High Court, particularly since the 1980s.

== A brief history ==
Australian courts take the view that contract law arose in the actions of assumpsit, and concepts of motive and reliance.

Bargain theory is an important part of how contract law is understood; quid pro quo, is understood to be an essential element.

The law of equity plays an important role in Australian contracts, and will affect which remedies may be available when a contractual promise is breached.

Doctrines of importance to contract law practitioners include negligent mis-statement, promissory estoppel, and misleading or deceptive conduct.

== Formation ==
There are five essential elements necessary for legally binding contract formation:

1. Agreement between the parties. There cannot be a unilateral contract.
2. Consideration (a bargain requirement: generally, the supply of money, property or services or a promise to undertake, or not undertake a particular act in exchange for something of value);
3. Capacity to enter legal relations (e.g. of sound mind and legal age);
4. Intention by the parties to enter into legal relations (private non-commercial agreements between family members may not indicate intention to enter a legally binding contract and therefore may not be enforceable); and
5. Certainty (the contract has to be complete, certain, clear and binding).

The absence of any of these elements will signify either that there is in law no agreement or that the agreement is not enforceable as a contract.

In most jurisdictions contracts do not need to be represented in writing and oral contract are as enforceable as written contracts. However, there are a number of exceptions that have been created by statute follow from the Statute of Frauds 1677 (UK) and were principally designed to reduce fraud. Examples are marine insurance which is not enforceable unless it is documented in writing. Also consumer credit must be documented in written form with a copy provided to the consumer. Similar formalities are required for the sale of land. The courts however will intervene so that the Statute of Frauds is not made an instrument of fraud.

=== Agreement ===
The existence of an agreement between the parties is usually analysed through the rules of offer and acceptance. This may be expressed as a clear indication ("offer") by one party (the "offeror") of a willingness to be bound on certain terms. accompanied by a communication by the other party (the "offeree") to the offeror of an unqualified assent to that offer ("acceptance").

An offer indicates an intention by the offeror to be bound without further discussion or negotiation, on acceptance of the terms set out. The court will determine the offeror's intention objectively. It is distinguished from an "invitation to treat", which is a request to others to make offers to engage in negotiations with a contract in mind. Items displayed for sale are invitations to treat. An offer is also distinguished from "mere puff". An offer may be made to become liable to anyone who, before it is withdrawn, accepts the offer. It may be restricted to certain classes of people; or on the other hand be made to anyone who, before it is withdrawn, accepts the offer, including unascertained persons, or to the public at large. However, an offer is ineffective until it has been communicated, either by the offeror or a third person acting with the offeror's authority. In some circumstances, the difference between an offer and an invitation to treat can be hard to recognise. For example, in property auction cases the auctioneers language should generally be constructed to be inviting bids, as opposed to offering the house. According to the New South Wales Supreme Court case of AGC (Advances) Ltd v McWhirter, withdrawing a properties reserve price during an auction does not obligate the sale. This is different to the British case, Barry v Davies which found that if an auctioneer removes the reserve, they are bound to sell to a bona fide purchaser.

An acceptance of the offer resulting in a binding contract must take place with knowledge of the offer and an intention to accept the offer. Although acceptance need not be express and may be implied from conduct, it must correspond with the offer; be unequivocal; and in general, be communicated to the offeror. Silence cannot be requested by the offeror to be, or used by the offeree as a method of communication for acceptance. Rather, if after a reasonable period has lapsed, silence will be seen as a rejection to the offer, unless the offeree's actions objectively show otherwise. Where a purported acceptance proposes one or more additional or different terms it is ineffective as an acceptance, unless the variation is solely in favour of the offeror. A purported acceptance will also be ineffective if made at a time when the offer has lapsed by virtue of time; if it is made subject to a contingency and that contingency ceases to exist; if the offeror dies and the offeree has notice of this fact; by the revocation of the offeror or the rejection by the offeree.

The postal rule is an exception to the general rule that acceptance of an offer takes place when communicated to the offeror. Under the rule, acceptance of an offer is effective as soon as it is posted, notwithstanding it may be lost in the delivery process and not received by the offerer. However, the postal acceptance rule does not extend to instantaneous telecommunication methods, such as telephone, facsimile, and, presumably, emails. This means that, where acceptance is communicated electronically, contract is formed when and where acceptance is received, rather than at the moment it is posted. Transactions via electronic communications are now governed by statute.

However, the rules of offer and acceptance are merely "an aid to analysis", and may sometimes prove inconclusive or artificial. A contract can be made without an identifiable offer and acceptance, provided the parties have manifested their mutual assent. The "acid test" in a case where offer and acceptance cannot be identified, according to Justice Cooke in Meates v Attorney-General, "is whether, viewed as a whole and objectively from the point of view of reasonable persons on both sides, the dealings show a concluded bargain."

=== Consideration ===
The second element necessary for contract formation is consideration. A promise will be enforceable as a contract only if it is supported by consideration, Consideration can be anything from money to a promise to undertake or not undertake a particular act, even a mere peppercorn could suffice. In Australian law, the question of sufficiency of consideration does not refer to 'adequacy' as it is not the role of the judge to determine and value whether something is adequate or valuable or not. This accounts for the fact that different things mean differently to different parties. Sufficient consideration may also include abstract exchanges such as 'love and affection'.

"Consideration" in this context means that a promise is given in return for a promise received. The usage of the word derives from expressions such as: "I will give you ten pounds in consideration of the apples you are delivering to me."

Joint promisees: Consideration given in return for a promise must move from the promisee; where there are joint promisees in a contract, consideration may be provided by one on behalf of both of them, or consideration may be provided by both promisees.

Generally past consideration is not sufficient consideration but a past service performed at the request of the promisor with an implication they will be paid for is sufficient consideration for a subsequent promise to pay for them.

Illusory Consideration: An agreement may be held as void if a vital provision is deemed to be illusory. That is, that one part has a discretion either to the performance or to the content of that provision. Note, if one party has some latitude or discretion as to the manner in which certain agreed provisions will be effected, but that discretion is limited, then the provisions are not illusory.

Further, a contract will not be illusory where an essential term is left to the discretion of a third party.

=== Capacity ===
Contractual capacity refers to the ability of a party to enter into a legally binding contract. Minors, drunks, and the mentally impaired may not possess adequate capacity however the ordinary reasonable person is presumed by default to have contractual capacity. Where there is a lack of capacity to contract, an agreement may be rendered void.

=== Intention ===
The fourth element is that the parties must create an intention to create legal relations. The intention requirement has often been approached on the basis that parties to commercial arrangements are presumed to intend legal consequences, while parties to social or domestic agreements are presumed not to intend legal consequences. Such presumptions determine who bears the onus of proof. In Ermogenous v Greek Orthodox Community of SA, a case relating to the engagement of a minister of religion, the High Court was, however, critical of the utility of a language of presumptions in this context.

Preliminary agreements become apparent when parties enter into an agreement, however that is yet to have been formalised in a more intricate agreement which will be signed by both parties. Where one party later refuses to continue with the agreement, the question thus arises whether the first agreement was intended to be enforceable. In Masters v Cameron the High Court held three possibilities to be available;

1. The parties are immediately bound to the bargain, but they intend to restate the deal in a more formalized contract that will not have a different effect; or,
2. Parties intended to be immediately bound, however their performance of terms is suspended until their intention is formalised through conclusion of legal documentation; or,
3. Parties do not intend to be immediately bound, instead they intend to be bound only when a properly drawn contract has been signed.

There is a prima facie presumption that this third category is evident where the phrase 'subject to contract' has been utilised. Subsequent authorities have been willing to recognise a fourth category in addition to those stated in Masters v Cameron.

4. The parties intend to immediately bound by the terms agreed upon and expect to create a further contract as a replacement for the initial contract which will contain additional terms (if agreed upon).

Although the fourth category may seem similar to the first Masters v Cameron category, the distinction is the formal contract may differ in effect from the initial agreement.

=== Certainty ===
For contract formation the agreement must be sufficiently certain and sufficiently complete that the parties' rights and obligations can be identified and enforced. The topic of certainty encompasses three related and often overlapping problems:

1. The agreement may be incomplete because the parties have failed to reach agreement on all of the essential elements or have decided that an essential matter should be determined by future agreement;
2. The agreement may be uncertain because the terms are too vague or ambiguous for a meaning to be attributed by a court;
3. A particular promise may be illusory because the contract effectively gives the promisor an unfettered discretion as to whether to perform the promise.

The case law reflect the tension between, on the one hand, the desire to hold parties to their bargains in accordance with the principle pacta sunt servanda and, on the other hand, the courts' reluctance to make a bargain for the parties. Although there have been differences in Australian judicial opinion as to the role of the court in giving effect to a contract, in general the courts give primacy to the need to uphold agreements, particularly executed agreements and commercial arrangements.

== Terms ==
A term is any clause or provision in a contract. The two main issues which arise in relation to contractual terms are: what are the terms of the contract (identification) and what are their legal effects (construction).

=== Express terms ===
An express term is an enforceable, promissory statement, written or oral, that makes up part of a contract.

Only terms made reasonably available to each party before a contract is made can be incorporated into the contract. For example, a party can incorporate terms when the other party knows, before or at the time the contract was made, that a delivered document or a displayed sign on premises contained the contractual terms in question. However, for tickets with unusual and obscure terms, the passenger must be given reasonable notice and time to read the provisions, especially if they refer to terms found elsewhere.

If parties have had a history of dealings, the contractual terms introduced in earlier contracts may be incorporated into a subsequent contract, as being known by the parties. For these terms to be incorporated into the present contract, the course of dealings between the parties needs to have been regular and uniform, contractual in nature, consistent, and sufficiently long.

Although some statements made before the contract was entered into may have been intended to operate as terms, not all such statements will in fact operate as terms. Whether or not a statement made during negotiations is an enforceable term depends on whether or not the contract is one that is fully in writing, or one that contains an oral agreement. If a contract is fully in writing, then no statements made outside of the contractual document will be enforceable. This is known as the Parol evidence rule. This is sometimes made even more explicit by the inclusion of an entire agreement clause, which clarifies that no other statements or extrinsic materials may have any bearing on the terms. In the absence of an entire agreement or merger clause, the parties' intention for the whole of the agreement to be in the written contract must be considered. By the flexible approach, extrinsic evidence may be admitted in the determination of whether the agreement is wholly in writing. That is, the prima facie appearance of the contract to be a complete contract provides no more than an evidentiary basis for inferring that the document was wholly written. The presence of a written document creates a presumption that all the terms are contained in that document, but courts have recently been willing to allow this presumption to be rebutted. If the extrinsic evidence was promissory in nature and viewed objectively was intended by the parties to supplement the written document and form part of the contract, the existence of the evidence may support the view that the document was not wholly in writing and thus could be incorporated into the contract. Such a contract would be considered to be partly written and partly oral. For contracts that are made entirely by oral agreement, a statement will be an express term if it is promissory in nature.

=== Implied terms ===
Apart from the terms expressly agreed, by reason of what the parties have written or said, implied terms may also exist to impose obligations on the parties or to qualify the terms of their bargain. Implied terms are not necessarily excluded by entire contract clauses.

==== Terms implied in fact ====
A term may be implied ‘in fact’ into a contract, to give full effect to the presumed intentions of the contracting parties. Terms implied in fact are terms that are ‘tailored’, and therefore unique, to the particular contract in question. Terms implied in fact are traditionally said to be based on the ‘presumed’ intentions of the parties concerned.

In formal contracts, in ascertaining a party's presumed intentions, reliance is placed on the rule handed down in BP Refinery (Westernport) Pty Ltd v Shire of Hastings (1977) where, for a term to be implied, the following conditions must be satisfied:

1. Reasonable and Equitable: it must be reasonable and equitable. Reasonableness alone is not a sufficient reason for implying a term.
2. Business Efficacy: it must be necessary to give business efficacy to the contract so that no term will be implied if the contract is effective without it. This question may be interpreted as being whether or not reasonable persons would consider that the proposed term was necessary to enable the contract to operate in a businesslike manner.
3. Obviousness: it must be so obvious that "it goes without saying". Prima facie, that which in any contract is left to be implied and need not be expressed is something so obvious that it goes without saying; so that, if, while the parties were making their bargain, an officious bystander were to suggest some express provision for it in their agreement, they would testily suppress him with a common ‘Oh, of course!’.
4. Clarity: it must be capable of clear and precise expression.
5. Consistency: it must not contradict any express term of the contract.

These criteria have been approved by the High Court on numerous occasions.

In the case of an informal contract, where the parties have not attempted to stipulate the full terms, the courts should imply a term upon referring to the imputed intention of the parties, provided that the particular term is necessary for the effective operation of the contract. In implying terms in an informal contract, the High Court has suggested that a flexible approach is required. In a case where it is apparent that the parties have not attempted to spell out the full terms of their contract, the court should imply a term by reference to the imputed intentions of the parties if, but only if, it can be seen that the implication of the particular term is necessary for the reasonable or effective operation of a contract of that nature in the circumstances of the case. Obviousness also remains an important element in implying a term in an informal contract.

==== Terms implied in law ====
Terms implied in law are terms automatically implied in contracts of a particular class or description deriving from legal principles rather than the intentions of the parties to the contract. For a term to be implied in law, the relevant test is whether the omission of the term would significantly diminish the rights of the parties under contract. This has been referred to as the test of necessity, which has been differentiated from the business efficacy test conducted in the implication of terms in fact, due to the former test taking into regard considerations of policy, and among other things such as the nature of the contract, and justice and policy.

==== Terms implied by custom ====
A term can also be implied by customs. The existence of a custom or usage that will justify the implication of a term into a contract is a question of facts. There must be evidence that the custom relied on is so well known and acquiesced in that everyone making a contract in that situation can reasonably be presumed to have imported that term into the contract. The custom is only to be inferred from a large number of individual acts which shows an established understanding of a course of business. The implied term cannot contradict an existing express term. However, a person may still be bound by a custom notwithstanding the fact that he had no knowledge of it.

=== Construction of terms ===
Where the terms of the contract are ambiguous or susceptible to more than one meaning, evidence of surrounding circumstances and context may be admissible to assist in its interpretation. The High Court has recently reiterated the Codelfa ruling regarding the use of existence evidence in the interpretation of contacts. For example, this would commonly invite one to examine the commercial purpose of the transaction, its background and context, common practices etc. Moreover, courts tend to favour an interpretation that produces a reasonable commercially accepted result and avoids unjust or inconvenient consequences to both parties. It is also important to note that the subjective intention of the parties is irrelevant. The construction of contractual documents is determined by what a reasonable person in the position of the party would have understood the words to mean. With regard to a recent judgment made by the High Court in Western Export Services Inc v Jireh International Pty Ltd, Justices Gummow, Heydon and Bell agree the position of the Australian courts: where a court is not justified in disregarding unambiguous language simply because the contract would have a more commercial and businesslike operation if an interpretation different to that dictated by the language were adopted. This High Court decision defends the original NSW Court of Appeal judgment and ultimately upholds the rule observed in Codelfa and Royal Botanic Gardens and Domain Trust v South Sydney City Council.

=== Effect of a signature ===
The L'Estrange Rule governs the effect of a signature in contracts law, which states that a party is bound by the terms of a contractual document once it is signed regardless of whether or not the party has read or understood the terms in a contract. Toll (FGCT) Pty Ltd v Alphapharm Pty Ltd affirms this objective approach as it upholds that a person who signs either has read and approved the contents of the document or is willing to take the chance of being bound by the content. To undermine that assumption would cause serious mischief. This is on the basis that it provides an objective criteria as to whether a party has agreed to the terms of a contract. However, this rule is subject to exceptions. A signature will not be binding where the signature was obtained by a fraud or misrepresentation, or where document was not known to be a contract by the party signing it. The signature will not be binding if the document signed cannot be reasonably considered a contractual document, this includes receipts, vouchers, timesheet etc. The act of signature or executive enables third parties to assume the legal efficacy of the contract.

== Illegality ==
A contract may be illegal because it is prohibited by statute or because it infringes a rule of public policy. Where a contract is not expressly or implicitly prohibited by statute, the court must discern from the scope and purpose of the relevant statute "whether the legislative purpose will be fulfilled without regarding the contract or the trust as void and unenforceable".

There are a range of consequences of illegality:

1. Unenforceable contract: Where a contract is found to be unenforceable, it continues to be valid if both parties perform the agreement, but the court will not enforce it. However, there is some support for the view that a plaintiff who was innocent should be able to enforce the contract.
2. Non-Retrieval: Another consequence of illegality is that neither party may recover money or property transferred under the affected contract. However, there are exceptions where the plaintiff is a victim of the contract, or where the plaintiff repents and repudiates the contract before the illegal purpose is carried out.
3. Estoppel: A party may be prevented from avoiding his or her contractual obligations under the doctrine of estoppel, where there are notions of unconscionability, despite the illegality.
4. Rescission: Puts party in positions before the formation of the contract. E.g., any deposits held previously by a vendor in a sale shall be returned. Parties in rescission cannot be awarded compensation for collateral loss.
5. Statutory penalty if a statutory penalty has been provided for an offence, this may diminish the effect of the common law in determining the legal consequences. Thus where the statute provides for an authority to have a supervisory role, the court should not pre-empt the effect of the exercise of those regulatory powers.

== Termination ==
The common law rule against perpetuities means that every contract must come to an end in one way or an other. The contract may be completed, it may be for a fixed period of time, in which case the contract automatically comes to an end once that time expires.

=== Express right to terminate ===
A contract may include an express term grant an express right for either or both parties to terminate. Such a clause may provide for the termination of the contract in 3 ways, 'at will' (granting a right to terminate at any time), with notice (granting a right to terminate in compliance with a notice termination procedure), or when triggered by specified events (such as a breach of contractual condition or non-fulfilment of a contingent condition).

=== Implied right to terminate ===
Where a contract does not contain an express right to terminate, courts may find that the contract includes an implied right for one or both of the parties to terminate the contract. An implied termination clause usually requires the giving of reasonable notice of termination. What constitutes 'reasonable notice' is a question of fact, and will depend on the circumstances of the individual case.

=== Termination by subsequent agreement ===
Parties may terminate a contract by making a subsequent agreement under which they both agree to release the other party from their obligations under the original contract. This subsequent contract must comply with the ordinary rules of contract formation, including consideration. Where both parties still have obligations to perform under the contract, each party will provide consideration in agreeing to release the other part from his or her remaining obligations. In cases where contracts have been partly performed (where one party has fully performed their obligations under the contract), the non-performing party can also provide fresh consideration by an accord and satisfaction. This is the purchase of a release from an obligation by giving any valuable consideration that is not the actual performance of the original obligation. The need for consideration can be avoided by executing a deed.

Where parties make no express statement of how the subsequent agreement interacts with the original, it can be inferred from the circumstances whether the original contract has been terminated. The parties may have intended the subsequent agreement to replace the original contract, or they may have intended it to vary the terms of the original contract. Whether the agreement was intended to replace or vary the original is a 'matter of degree'. Dependent upon the circumstances in each case different aspects may be considered by a court. Concut v Worrell illustrates some factors that may be assessed in employment relationships.

=== Termination for breach ===
In the absence of an express term for the termination of a contract, whether a breach of the contract gives rise to a right for the innocent party to terminate the contract depends on the classification of the term as a:

1. Condition: An aggrieved party will be entitled to terminate for any breach of that term by the other party regardless of the gravity or consequences of that breach. The appropriate test is the test of essentiality. The promise is of such importance to the promisee that he would not have entered into the contract unless he had been assured of a strict or a substantial performance of the promise and this ought to have been apparent to the promisor. This is an objective test of the parties' intention at the time of formation of the contract.
2. Warranty: Warranties arise if, in the absence of a clear expression to the contrary, there is no possibility that a breach of a particular term would deprive the aggrieved party of all or part of their expected benefit from the contract as a whole. Therefore, the aggrieved party will not be entitled to terminate merely by reason of a breach of the term by the other party.
3. Intermediate or innominate term: the aggrieved party's right to terminate will depend on the severity of the breach and its consequence. The seriousness of the breach will determine whether termination is allowed or the party can sue for damages. If the breach is likely to have serious consequences for further performance then they will be entitled to terminate. The test for serious innominate terms is whether the breach would deprive the aggrieved party of substantially the whole benefit intended under the contract.

The test for whether the term is essential and therefore gives rise to the right to terminate is:

1. whether it appears from the general nature of the contract, or from some particular term or terms,
2. that the promise is of such importance to the promisee that he would not have entered into the contract unless he had been assured of a strict or substantial performance of the promise
3. and that this was apparent to the promisor.

=== Termination for failure of contingent condition ===
Parties may make the formation and performance of their contract conditional upon the occurrence of a specified event that neither party promises to ensure will occur. If the event does not occur, then one or both parties will be entitled to terminate the contract. The parties must do everything reasonably in their power to see that the contingent condition is fulfilled.

The time for fulfilment of a contingent condition may be expressly specified in the condition. If no time is specified, the courts will construe the contract as requiring the condition be fulfilled within a reasonable period of time, having regard to the circumstances of the case.

In certain contracts, it may be unclear if non-fulfilment of a contingent condition has occurred where there is a subjective requirement in the contract, such as whether one party has achieved "satisfactory finance." If the contingent condition is a subjective fact, parties must act "honestly" or genuinely believe the condition to be true.

Both parties may act together to agree to waive a contingent condition, meaning that they would be bound by that agreement and many not terminate the contract for non-fulfillment of the condition. A party can waive the contingent condition if the contingent condition was for the benefit of that party.

=== Termination for repudiation ===
Where one party manifests an unwillingness/inability to perform his/her contractual obligations, the other party has the right to terminate. This does not depend upon the subjective intention of that party. An intention to repudiate may be evinced through either express or implied conduct, or may be ascertained from a combination of smaller breaches.

The unwillingness/inability to perform must relate to whole of the contract, to a condition of the contract or be "fundamental". This may be evidenced by a single act or by an accumulation of conduct. It has been laid down by the High Court in Shevill v Builders Licensing Board (Shevill) that the lessor cannot claim for loss of damages but is entitled to receive arrears in rent because the lessor could only rely on a contractual right to terminate, and not on a common law right. It is noteworthy that the said anti-Shevill clauses have been commonly included in the leasing agreements since Shevill, which provide that specified terms are essential terms or conditions, that any breach of such terms will be fundamental and the landlord has the rights to claim for damages on termination on the ground of a breach of essential terms. The High Court confirmed that the anti-Shevill clauses are effective in Gumland Property Holdings Pty Limited v Duffy Bros Fruit Market (Campbelltown) Pty Limited.

A party may also repudiate a contract through a lack of willingness or ability to perform some particular obligations. That will be the case where the particular obligations is "fundamental", and it would deprive the aggrieved part of substantially the whole of the benefit of the obligations remaining to be performed under the contract.

Anticipatory Breach is an important aspect of the doctrine of repudiation. Anticipatory Breach occurs where one party repudiates their obligations under the contract prior to the time set to perform obligations. In response, an aggrieved party may, by accepting the repudiation, elect to terminate the contract and claim damages. However, in an instance where an aggrieved party chooses not to accept the repudiation occurring before the time set for performance, the contract will continue on food and the aggrieved party will have no right to damages unless and until an actual breach occurs.

A party that acts on a genuine but erroneous view of its obligations under the contract will not for that reason alone have repudiated it. That party may still be willing to perform the contract according to its tenor; to recognise its heresy; or to accept an authoritative exposition of the contract

Renunciation is an alternate term where the conduct of a party is no longer willing or able to perform see Koompahtoo Local Aboriginal Land Council v Sanpine Pty Limited.

=== Termination by frustration ===
Frustration occurs whenever the law recognises that without fault of either party, a contractual obligation has become incapable of being performed because the circumstances in which performance is called for would render it a thing radically different from that which was undertaken by the contract. The elements of frustration are:

1. The event occurring after the contract was made, must make it physically or legally impossible to perform what was originally promised (i.e. it is not enough that it makes it more difficult or more expensive)
2. The party seeking to rely on the frustration is not at fault for the frustrating event;
3. The contract must not have exhibited an intent that one or other was to bear the risk of occurrence of events of this kind;
4. Frustration is seldom found in unexpected (and unprovided for) circumstances that could reasonably have been foreseen at the time of contracting.

A contract may be frustrated by events which cause, or are likely to cause, an inordinate delay in the performance of the contract. The delay must be such as to seriously affect the intended performance of the contract. Examples of frustration include:

- where as a result of a change in the law, performance of a contract is rendered illegal;
- where a particular thing which forms the subject matter of a contract, and whose continued existence of which is essential to the performance of that contract, ceases to exist;
- where the basis of the contract is dependent on the continued existence of a particular set of circumstances which cease to exist;
- Where the decisions of government interferes to render a contract something entirely different from the one the parties originally made.

=== Termination by delay ===
Whether delay gives rise to a right to terminate will depend on the terms of the contract. Where the contract stipulates a time for performance, the issue is whether the time stipulation can be regarded as being a condition of the contract, that is the time is considered to be "essential" and time is "of the essence". If time is of the essence and there is a failure by one party to perform their obligations under the contract by the appropriate time, the innocent party will have a right to elect to terminate the contract.

Where the contract stipulates a time for performance, however time is not of the essence and there is a failure by one party to perform their obligations under the contract by the appropriate time, the innocent party may still gain a right to terminate for the delay through use of the notice procedure. Either the delay must be shown to be unreasonable, after which a party can issue a notice with regards to termination, or the offending party must already be in actual breach of the time stipulated in the contract. The notice must specify a reasonable time for completion, indicate that time is of the essence and that failure to adhere to the conditions will result in termination of the contract. Additionally, the non-offending party must be ready, willing and able to perform their contractual obligations at the time the notice is issued.

Where there is no time is specified for performance, the law implies an obligation to perform within a reasonable time. In such circumstances, it is highly unlikely that time will be viewed as being "of the essence", unless failure to perform within a reasonable time will have serious consequences for the aggrieved party.

== Restrictions on termination ==
=== Restrictions on the right to terminate for non-fulfilment of a contingent condition ===
A party may lose the right to terminate for non-fulfilment of contingent condition if the party has prevented the condition's performance or has intimated that they do not intend to perform the contract. Furthermore, a party who waives the right to rely on non-fulfilment of contingent condition will be bound by this decision once it has been communicated to other party.

The right to terminate for non-fulfilment of a contingent condition can also be restricted by doctrines of estoppel, good faith, where one party falsely leads other party into believing they will not exercise their right to terminate contract on the basis of non fulfilment of contingent condition, misleading or deceptive conduct or unconscionable conduct in breach of the Australian Consumer Law.

=== Election and affirmation ===
When the aggrieved party gains the right to terminate (whether by breach, repudiation or other causes), they must make a decision whether to terminate or not. This decision is referred to as 'election'. The Aggrieved party must elect whether to terminate the contract, or to affirm it (and thus continue it). Once a decision is made, it cannot be reversed. For there to be an election the aggrieved party must be aware that they have the right to terminate and must display unequivocal conduct that is only consistent with the performance of the contract.

==== Election ====
If the aggrieved party elects to terminate, both parties are discharged from future obligations and the aggrieved party can receive damages. In order for this to occur, the aggrieved party must be ready and willing to perform the contract at the time of breach.

==== Affirmation ====
In order to affirm a contract, the aggrieved party must have

1. Knowledge of facts giving rise to right to terminate.
2. Act in a way that is unequivocally consistent with choice to continue contract

Because the Aggrieved Party has affirmed the contract, they do not have the right to terminate any longer. The non-performing party is thereby absolved and is treated as a normal party. They are henceforth entitled to rely on subsequent events e.g. frustration or breach of term by the Aggrieved party to their own advantage.

== Australian legislation affecting contracts ==
Most States have effected statutes relating to the sale of goods, such as the Sale of Goods Act 1896, (Qld) which imply conditions and warranties in relation to fitness and merchantability. However, in many instances such implied terms can be displaced by the contrary intention appearing in the contract between the parties. This has meant that, in practice, in many sale of goods contracts these provisions are displaced.

There are similar implied terms under the Australian Consumer Law relating to fitness and duty to take reasonable care in some classes of contract, and these particular terms are unable to be displaced by contrary intention: that is, the term will be implied into a contract of that kind irrespective of the parties' intention.

The Australian Consumer Law, together with Fair Trading legislation in all states, also allows a corporation or person to be sued where they have engaged in misleading or deceptive conduct regarding commercial or trade matters.

- Independent Contractors Act 2006 (Cth)
- Frustrated Contracts Act 1978 (NSW)
- Contracts Review Act 1980 (NSW)

== When Equity may intervene ==
The common law will hold a contract to be binding as long the essential elements for a contract are present (i.e. agreement, consideration, certainty etc.). However, in certain situations equity may intervene and make the contract either voidable or void. The rule in Yerkey v Jones and the principles of non-est factum, misrepresentation, and special disadvantage. are some of the situations in which equity may intervene and make the contract voidable or void. To note, a defence to the principle in Yerkey v Jones, is that the "wives guarantee" will not apply if the lender can show that they took reasonable steps to ensure they had reasonable grounds for believing that the consent was fairly obtained.

Furthermore, equitable relief seeks to remedy unconscionability and not to punish the wrongdoer. An important equitable remedy is the order of equitable rescission where the advantage over its common law counterpart is that the parties need not be restored precisely to their position before the contract.

== Vitiating factors ==
A number of decisions from Australian courts have also affected the circumstances where legal action can be taken regarding contracts, recognising factors that change contractual obligations. These include situations involving "unconscionable dealings", where one party is at a "special disadvantage", or where a party exercises "undue influence", and will commonly result in the contract being declared void or voidable by the court. Other vitiating factors may include "misrepresentation" if it amounts to a false statement of a material fact made by the representor to the represent in order to induce the represent to enter into the contract and which has this effect, "misleading and deceptive conduct", "mistake", "duress", and "unconscionable conduct". In general law, the remedy for vitiating factors is rescission and full restoration, even in cases of third party impropriety.
