= Bargaining power =

Relative ability of two parties in disagreement to influence each other

Bargaining power is the relative ability of parties in a negotiation (such as bargaining, contract writing, or making an agreement) to exert influence over each other in order to achieve favourable terms in an agreement. This power is derived from various factors such as each party’s alternatives to the current deal, the value of what is being negotiated, and the urgency of reaching an agreement. A party's bargaining power can significantly shift the outcome of negotiations, leading to more advantageous positions for those who possess greater leverage.

If both parties are on an equal footing in a debate, then they will have equal bargaining power, such as in a perfectly competitive market, or between an evenly matched monopoly and monopsony. In many cases, bargaining power is not static and can be enhanced through strategic actions such as improving one's alternatives, increasing the perceived value of one's offer, or altering the negotiation timeline. A party's bargaining power can significantly shift the outcome of negotiations, leading to more advantageous positions for those who possess greater leverage.

The dynamics of bargaining power extend beyond individual negotiations to affect industries, economies, and international relations. In the realm of international trade negotiations, countries with larger economies or unique resources may wield greater bargaining power, affecting the terms of trade agreements and economic policies. Similarly, in labour economics, for example, the bargaining power of workers versus employers can influence wage levels, working conditions, and job security. Understanding the factors that influence bargaining power and how it can be balanced or leveraged is crucial for negotiators, policymakers, and analysts striving to achieve favorable outcomes in various contexts.

There are a number of fields where the concept of bargaining power has proven crucial to coherent analysis, including game theory, labour economics, collective bargaining arrangements, diplomatic negotiations, settlement of litigation, the price of insurance, and any negotiation in general.

== Theories of distribution ==
The distribution of bargaining power among negotiating parties is a central theme in various theoretical frameworks, spanning economics, game theory, and sociology. These theories provide insights into how power dynamics are established, negotiated, and shifted in bargaining situations.

=== Social Exchange Theory ===
Blau (1964), and Emerson (1976) were the key theorists who developed the original theories of social exchange. Social exchange theory approaches bargaining power from a sociological perspective, suggesting that power dynamics in negotiations are influenced by the value of the resources each party brings to the exchange (a cost-benefit analysis), as well as the level of dependency between the parties. According to this theory, bargaining power increases when a party possesses resources that are highly valued and scarce, and when there are few alternatives to these resources. This theory underscores the relational aspect of bargaining power, where power is not inherent to the parties but emerges from the context of their relationship and exchange.

=== Principal-Agent Theory ===
Jensen and Meckling (1976), Mirrlees (1976), Ross (1973), and Stiglitz (1975) were the key theorists who initiated the original theories of principal-agent theory. The principal-agent theory, often discussed in the context of corporate governance and contract theory, examines how bargaining power is distributed between principals (e.g., shareholders) and agents (e.g., managers). This theory highlights issues of information asymmetry, where agents might have more information than principals, potentially skewing bargaining power in favour of the agents. Mechanisms such as incentive schemes and performance monitoring are discussed as ways to align the interests of the principal and agent, thereby rebalancing bargaining power.

=== Economic Theories of Bargaining ===
Economic theories of bargaining often focus on how the allocation of resources, market conditions, and alternative options influence bargaining power. The concept of BATNA (Best Alternative to a Negotiated Agreement) plays a crucial role in this context, positing that a party's bargaining power is significantly determined by the attractiveness of their options outside the negotiation. According to this perspective, the more advantageous the BATNA, the greater the party's bargaining power, as they have less to lose by walking away from the negotiation table.

=== Game Theory and Bargaining ===
Game theory provides a mathematical framework to analyze bargaining situations, offering insights into the strategies that parties may employ to maximise their outcomes. The Nash Equilibrium, for instance, describes a situation where no party can benefit by changing their strategy while the other parties keep theirs unchanged, highlighting the balance of power in strategic interactions. The Ultimatum Game is another game theory model that illustrates how the power to propose how a resource is divided can drastically affect the distribution outcomes, even when such proposals are not equitable.

== Calculation ==
Several formulations of bargaining power have been devised. A popular one from 1951 and due to American economist Neil W. Chamberlain is:

We may define bargaining power (of A, let us say) as being the cost to B of disagreeing on A's terms relative to the costs of agreeing on A's terms ... Stated in another way, a (relatively) high cost to B of disagreement with A means that A's bargaining power is strong. A (relatively) high cost of agreement means that A's bargaining power is weak. Such statements in themselves, however, reveal nothing of the strength or weakness of A relative to B, since B might similarly possess a strong or weak bargaining power. But if the cost to B of disagreeing on A's terms are greater than the cost of agreeing on A's terms, while the cost to A of disagreeing on B's terms is less than the cost of agreeing on B's terms, then A's bargaining power is greater than that of B. More generally, only if the difference to B between the costs of disagreement and agreement on A's terms is proportionately greater than the difference to A between the costs of disagreement and agreement on B's terms can it be said that A's bargaining power is greater than that of B.

In another formulation, bargaining power is expressed as a ratio of a party's ability to influence the other participant, to the costs of not reaching an agreement to that party:

$$BP_A \text{ (Bargaining Power of A)} = \frac{\text{Benefits and Costs that can be inflicted upon B}}{\text{A's cost of not agreeing}}$$

$$BP_B \text{ (Bargaining Power of B)} = \frac{\text{Benefits and Costs that can be inflicted upon A}}{\text{B's cost of not agreeing}}$$

If $BP_A$ is greater than $BP_B$, then A has greater Bargaining Power than B, and the resulting agreement will tend to favor A. The reverse is expected if B has greater bargaining power instead.

These formulations and more complex models with more precisely defined variables are used to predict the probability of observing a certain outcome from a range of outcomes based on the parties' characteristics and behavior before and after the negotiation.

== Buying power ==
Buying power is a specific type of bargaining power relating to a purchaser and a supplier. For example, a retailer may be able to dictate price to a small supplier if it has a large market share and or can bulk buy.

== Economic theory ==
In modern economic theory, the bargaining outcome between two parties is often modeled by the Nash Bargaining solution. An example is if party A and party B can collaborate in order to generate a surplus of $100$. If the parties fail to reach an agreement, party A gets a payoff $X$ and party B gets a payoff $Y$. If $X+Y<100$, reaching an agreement yields a larger total surplus. According to the generalized Nash bargaining solution, party A gets $X+\pi(100-X-Y)$ and party B gets $Y+(1-\pi)(100-X-Y)$, where $0 < \pi < 1$. There are different ways to derive $\pi$. For example, Rubinstein (1982) has shown that in a bargaining game with alternating offers, $\pi$ is close to $1$ when party A is much more patient than party B, while $\pi$ is equal to $\frac{1}{2}$ if both parties are equally patient. In this case, party A's payoff is increasing in $\pi$ as well as in $X$, and so both parameters reflect different aspects of party A's power. To clearly distinguish between the two parameters, some authors such as Schmitz refer to $\pi$ as party A's bargaining power and to $X$ as party A's bargaining position. A prominent application is the property rights approach to the theory of the firm. In this application, $\pi$ is often exogenously fixed to $\frac{1}{2}$, while $X$ and $Y$ are determined by investments of the two parties.

== Inequality ==
Inequality of bargaining power in law, economics and social sciences refers to a situation where one party to a bargain, contract or agreement, has more and better alternatives than the other party. This results in one party having greater power than the other to choose not to take the deal and makes it more likely that this party will gain more favourable terms and grant them more negotiating power (as they are in a better position to reject the deal). Inequality of bargaining power is generally thought to undermine the freedom of contract, resulting in a disproportionate level of freedom between parties, and it represents a place at which markets fail.

Where bargaining power is persistently unequal, the concept of inequality of bargaining power serves as a justification for the implication of mandatory terms into contracts by law, or the non-enforcement of a contract by the courts.

== See also ==
- Bargaining
- Collective buying power
- Inequality of bargaining power
- Intra-household bargaining
- Porter five forces analysis
- Purchasing power
