= Jack Diprose =

Australian rules footballer, born 1905

Personal information
- Full name: Jack Diprose
- Born: 12 October 1905
- Died: 12 October 2002 (aged 97)
- Original team: Prahran
- Height: 177 cm (5 ft 10 in)
- Weight: 81 kg (179 lb)

Playing career^{1}
Years	Club	Games (Goals)
1933–34	North Melbourne	19 (0)
- ^{1} Playing statistics correct to the end of 1934.

Jack Diprose (12 October 1905 – 12 October 2002) was an Australian rules footballer who played with North Melbourne in the Victorian Football League (VFL).
