= Standard form contract =

Type of contract between two parties

A standard form contract (sometimes referred to as a contract of adhesion, a leonine contract, (Note: A "leonine contract" is a contract where one party faces a possibility of loss but no possibility of gain. For example, in Republic of Djibouti et al. v Boreh et al. (2016), Zeinab Ali, a Djiboutian qualified lawyer and board member, argued that there were "leonine aspects" to a joint venture agreement for the development of the port of Doraleh in Djibouti. In cross-examination, Ali explained that by "leonine" she meant that the provisions in the contract ... were one-sided, preserving the rights of DP World (the port operator) to the detriment of the Republic. In the Scottish case of Sir William Hope of Kirkliston vs. William Gordon of Balcomy (or Balcomie) (1700), an alleged agreement between them is described as "a societas seu pactum leoninum, where [one] might have loss, but in no event any profit".) a take-it-or-leave-it contract, or a boilerplate contract) is a contract between two parties, where the terms and conditions of the contract are set by one of the parties, and the other party has little or no ability to negotiate more favorable terms and is thus placed in a "take it or leave it" position.

While these types of contracts are not illegal per se, there exists a potential for unconscionability. In addition, in the event of an ambiguity, such ambiguity will be resolved contra proferentem, i.e. against the party drafting the contract language.

== Theoretical issues ==
There is much debate on a theoretical level whether, and to what extent, courts should enforce standard form contracts.

On one hand, they undeniably fulfill an important role of promoting economic efficiency. Standard form contracting reduces transaction costs substantially by avoiding the need for buyers and sellers of goods and services to negotiate the details of a sale contract each time the product is sold.

On the other hand, there is the potential for inefficient, and even unjust, terms to be accepted by signatories to these contracts. Such terms might be seen as unjust if they allow the seller to avoid all liability or unilaterally modify terms or terminate the contract. These terms often come in the form of, but are not limited to, forum selection clauses and mandatory arbitration clauses, which can limit or foreclose a party's access to the courts; and also liquidated damages clauses, which set a limit to the amount that can be recovered or require a party to pay a specific amount. They might be inefficient if they place the risk of a negative outcome, such as defective manufacturing, on the buyer who is not in the best position to take precautions.

There are a number of reasons why such terms might be accepted:

Standard form contracts are rarely read
Lengthy boilerplate terms are often in fine print and written in complicated legal language which often seems irrelevant. The prospect of a buyer finding any useful information from reading such terms is correspondingly low. Even if such information is discovered, the consumer is in no position to bargain as the contract is presented on a "take it or leave it" basis. Coupled with the often large amount of time needed to read the terms, the expected payoff from reading the contract is low and few people would be expected to read it.
Access to the full terms may be difficult or impossible before acceptance
Often the document being signed is not the full contract; the purchaser is told that the rest of the terms are in another location. This reduces the likelihood of the terms being read and in some situations, such as software license agreements, can only be read after they have been notionally accepted by purchasing the good and opening the box. These contracts are typically not enforced, since common law dictates that all terms of a contract must be disclosed before the contract is executed.
Boilerplate terms are not salient
The most important terms to purchasers of good are generally the price and the quality, which are generally understood before the contract of adhesion is signed. Terms relating to events that have very small probabilities of occurring or which refer to particular statutes or legal rules do not seem important to the purchaser. This further lowers the chance of such terms being read and also means they are likely to be ignored even if they are read.
There may be social pressure to sign
Standard form contracts are signed at a point when the main details of the transaction have either been negotiated or explained. Social pressure to conclude the bargain at that point may come from a number of sources. The salesperson may imply that the purchaser is being unreasonable if they read or question the terms, saying that they are "just something the lawyers want us to do" or that they are wasting their time reading them. If the purchaser is at the front of a queue (for example at an airport car rental desk) there is additional pressure to sign quickly. Finally, if there has been negotiation over price or particular details, then concessions given by the salesperson may be seen as a gift which socially obliges the purchaser to respond by being co-operative and concluding the transaction.
Standard form contracts may exploit unequal power relations
If the good which is being sold using a contract of adhesion is one which is essential or very important for the purchaser to buy (such as a rental property or a needed medical item) then the purchaser might feel they have no choice but to accept the terms. This problem may be mitigated if there are many suppliers of the good who can potentially offer different terms (see below), although even this is not always possible (for instance, a college freshman may be required to sign a standard-form dormitory rental agreement and accept its terms, because the college will not allow a freshman to live off-campus).

Some contend that in a competitive market, consumers have the ability to shop around for the supplier who offers them the most favorable terms and are consequently able to avoid injustice. However, in the case of credit cards (and other oligopolies), for example, the consumer while having the ability to shop around may still have access to only form contracts with like terms and no opportunity for negotiation. Also, as noted, many people do not read or understand the terms so there might be very little incentive for a firm to offer favorable conditions as they would gain only a small amount of business from doing so. Even if this is the case, it is argued by some that only a small percentage of buyers need to actively read standard form contracts for it to be worthwhile for firms to offer better terms if that group is able to influence a larger number of people by affecting the firm's reputation.

Another factor that might mitigate the effects of competition on the content of contracts of adhesion is that, in practice, standard form contracts are usually drafted by lawyers instructed to construct them so as to minimize the firm's liability, not necessarily to implement managers' competitive decisions. Sometimes the contracts are written by an industry body and distributed to firms in that industry, increasing homogeneity of the contracts and reducing consumers' ability to shop around.

== Common law status ==
As a general rule, the common law treats standard form contracts like any other contract. The signature or some other objective manifestation of intent to be legally bound will bind the signor to the contract whether or not they read or understood the terms. The reality of standard form contracting, however, means that many common law jurisdictions have developed special rules with respect to them. In general, in the event of an ambiguity, the courts will interpret standard form contracts contra proferentem (against the party that drafted the contract), as that party (and only that party) had the ability to draft the contract to remove ambiguity.

=== United States ===
==== Generally ====
Standard form contracts are generally enforceable in the United States. The Uniform Commercial Code which is followed in most American states has specific provisions relating to standard form contracts for the sale or lease of goods. Furthermore, standard form contracts will be subject to special scrutiny if they are found to be contracts of adhesion.

==== Contracts of adhesion ====
The concept of the contract of adhesion originated in French civil law, but did not enter American jurisprudence until the Harvard Law Review published an influential article by Edwin W. Patterson in 1919. It was subsequently adopted by the majority of American courts, especially after the Supreme Court of California endorsed adhesion analysis in 1962. See Steven v. Fidelity & Casualty Co., 58 Cal. 2d 862, 882 n.10 (1962) (explaining the history of the concept).

For a contract to be treated as a contract of adhesion, it must be presented on a standard form on a "take it or leave it" basis, and give one party no ability to negotiate because of their unequal bargaining position. The special scrutiny given to contracts of adhesion can be performed in a number of ways:

- If the term was outside of the reasonable expectations of the person who did not write the contract, and if the parties were contracting on an unequal basis, then it will not be enforceable. The reasonable expectation is assessed objectively, looking at the prominence of the term, the purpose of the term and the circumstances surrounding the acceptance of the contract.
- Section 211 of the American Law Institute's Restatement (Second) of Contracts, which has persuasive though non-binding force in courts, provides:
  Where the other party has reason to believe that the party manifesting such assent would not do so if he knew that the writing contained a particular term, the term is not part of the agreement.
  This is a subjective test focusing on the mind of the seller and has been adopted by only a few state courts.
- The doctrine of unconscionability is a fact-specific doctrine arising from equitable principles. Unconscionability in standard form contracts usually arises where there is an "absence of meaningful choice on the part of one party due to one-sided contract provisions, together with terms which are so oppressive that no reasonable person would make them and no fair and honest person would accept them." (Fanning v. Fritz's Pontiac-Cadillac-Buick Inc.)

==== Shrink wrap contracts ====
Courts in the United States have faced the issue of shrink wrap contracts in two ways. One line of cases follows ProCD v. Zeidenberg which held such contracts enforceable (e.g. Brower v Gateway), and the other follows Klocek v. Gateway, Inc, which found them unenforceable. These decisions are split on the question of assent, with the former holding that only objective manifestation of assent is required while the latter require at least the possibility of subjective assent.

=== Canada ===
In Canada, exclusion clauses in a standard form contract cannot be relied on where a seller knows or has reason to know a purchaser is mistaken as to its terms (Tilden Rent-A-Car Co. v. Clendenning). The Supreme Court found a standard arbitration clause requiring a gig worker to litigate before the Dutch International Chamber of Commerce void due to unconscionability in Uber Technologies Inc v Heller (2020).

=== Australia ===
Standard form contracts have generally received little special treatment under Australian common law. A 2003 New South Wales Court of Appeal case (Toll (FGCT) Pty Limited v Alphapharm Pty Limited) gave some support for the position that notice of exceptional terms is required for them to be incorporated. However the defendant successfully appealed to the High Court so currently there is no special treatment of standard form contracts in Australia.

Since 1 January 2011, the Australian Consumer Law has been enacted in Australia at the national level, and due to a Council of Australian Governments (COAG) agreement this legislation is now part of each jurisdiction's (state's or territory's) Fair Trading laws.

=== India ===
In India leonine contracts are generally deemed unconscionable contracts (though not all leonine contracts are unconscionable contracts) and are voidable. The 199th Law Commission report (2006) on "UNFAIR (PROCEDURAL & SUBSTANTIVE) TERMS IN CONTRACT" deals with it. The unfairness can be procedural or substantive. However, standard form contracts are ubiquitous in India and especially in the digital age, standard form contracts are used much more frequently than any other form. They can be legally valid if reasonable notice has been given and if the terms are not unreasonable. Unfair terms in non-negotiated agreements are often held void.

== Legislation ==
In recognition of the consumer protection issues which may arise, many governments have passed specific laws relating to standard form contracts. These are generally enacted on a state level as part of general consumer protection legislation and typically allow consumers to avoid clauses that are found to be unreasonable, though the specific provisions vary greatly. Some laws require notice to be given for these clauses to be effective, others prohibit unfair clauses altogether (e.g. Victorian Fair Trading Act 1999).

=== United Kingdom ===
Section 3 of the Unfair Contract Terms Act 1977 (in England and Wales) and section 17 (in relation to standard form contracts in Scotland) limit the ability of the drafter of a consumer or standard form contract to draft clauses that would allow them to exclude liability in what is termed an exclusion clause. The act does not per se render ineffective provisions in other areas which to the layman appear "unfair". Where a contract has negotiated the provisions of the act likely would not apply – the law protects from a lot of things but openly making a bad bargain is not one of them. These provisions do not apply in contracts for the international sale of goods, i.e. where the parties' places of business are in the territories of different states.

=== Israel ===
The Standard Form Contract Act 1982 defines a set of depriving conditions that may be canceled by a court of law, including unreasonable exclusion or limitation of liability, unreasonable privileges to unilaterally cancel, suspend or postpone the execution of the contract and to change any fundamental charges or pricing, transfer of liability for the execution of the contract to a third party, unreasonable obligation to use the services of a third party or to limit, in any way, the choice of contracting third parties, denial of legal remedy, unreasonable limitations on contractual remedies or setting unreasonable conditions for the consummation of the remedy, denying or limiting the right for legal procedures, exclusive rights to decide on the location of the trial or arbitration, obligatory arbitration with unilaterally control over the arbitrators or the location of the arbitration and setting the holder of the burden of proof contrary to common law. The act also establishes a Standard Form Contract Court, chaired by a district judge and consists of a maximum of 12 members, appointed by the justice minister, including an acting chairman (also a district judge), civil servants (no more than a third) and, at least, 2 consumer organization representatives. The court holds hearings regarding appeals against standard form contract clauses or approval of a specific standard form contract at the requests of a provider.

=== Lithuania ===
Standard conditions in Lithuania shall be such provisions that are prepared in advance for general and repeated use by one contracting party without their content being negotiated with another party, and which are used in the formation of contracts without negotiation with the other party. Standard conditions prepared by one of the parties shall be binding to the other if the latter was provided with an adequate opportunity of getting acquainted with the said conditions (Article 6.185. Standard conditions of contracts, Lithuanian Civil Code). A consumer shall have the right to claim within the judicial procedure for invalidity of conditions in a consumer contract that are contrary to the criterion of good faith (Article 6.188).

== Civil law countries ==
=== Russia ===
In July 2013, Russian Dmitry Agarkov won a court case against Tinkoff Bank after he altered the standard form contract he had received in the mail. The bank, failing to notice the changes, accepted the application and gave him an account based on the amended contract. The judge ruled that the bank was legally bound to the contract it had signed. Agarkov is further suing the bank for failing to comply with the terms he had added to the contract, which it had unwittingly agreed to by signing the contract. Agarkov's lawyer, Dmitry Mihalevich said – "They signed the documents without looking. They said what usually their borrowers say in court: 'We have not read it'."

== See also ==
- Electronic Signatures in Global and National Commerce Act (ESIGN, USA)
- Hobson's choice
- Non est factum
- Terms of service
