= Employment Standards Act (Ontario) =

Ontario, Canada employment law

The Employment Standards Act, 2000 (the Act) is an Act of the Legislative Assembly of Ontario. The Act regulates employment in the province of Ontario, including wages, maximum work hours, overtime, vacation, and leaves of absence. It differs from the Labour Relations Act, 1995, which regulates unionized labour in Ontario.

== Act coverage ==
The Act sets out the minimum standards that employers and employees must follow in regards to:

- Continuity of employment
- Payment of wages
- Records
- Hours of work and eating periods
- Overtime pay
- Minimum wage
- Public holidays
- Vacation with pay
- Equal pay for equal work
- Benefits plans
- Leaves of absence (Pregnancy Leave, Parental leave, Family medical leave, Organ donor leave, Personal emergency leave, Emergency leave, declared emergencies, Reservist leave)
- Termination and severance of employment
- Lie detectors
- Retail business establishments
- Reprisal
- Temporary help agencies
- Building services providers

== Workers covered ==
The Act defines "employee" as including:

- a person, including an officer of a corporation, who performs work for an employer for wages,
- a person who supplies services to an employer for wages,
- a person who receives training from a person who is an employer, if the skill in which the person is being trained is a skill used by the employer’s employees, or
- a person who is a homeworker,

and includes a person who was an employee.

There is a prohibition on any employer treating an employee as if the person is not an employee under the Act.

== Administration ==
The Ministry of Labour administers the Act and its regulations by:

- providing compliance support
- conducting proactive inspections of payroll records and workplace practices to ensure the ESA is being followed
- investigating and resolving complaints
- enforcing the Act and its regulations

=== Compliance Support ===
The Ministry of Labour offers publications and services to help employees and employers understand their rights and comply with their obligations. These include an employment standards poster, which employers are required to post in their workplaces; a catalogue of fact sheets and information sheets covering a variety of topics; and interactive online tools and calculators to assist employers and employees to understand provisions of the Act, such as the Termination Tool, the Public Holiday Pay Calculator and the Severance Tool.

=== Proactive Inspections ===
Employment standards officers conduct proactive inspections of payroll and other records, including a review of employment practices. An officer performing a proactive inspection will usually visit the employer's business location. Officers may notify the employer in writing before the inspection but are not required to. A notice may set out a list of records and other documents the employer must provide during the inspection. The employer is required to produce the records requested and must answer questions that the officer thinks may be relevant. An officer is able to take away records or other information for review and copying.

=== Investigating complaints ===
In most cases, employees should attempt to contact their employer or former employer (or the client of a temporary help agency, if applicable) about the employment standards right(s) they believe have been violated. However, there might be a good reason for an employee to not contact their employer (e.g. If the employee is afraid to contact the employer or he or she is a young employee).

Employees have an opportunity to tell the ministry on the Claim Form why they did not contact their employer, or that they have already contacted their employer. If the employee contacted the employer but the issue was not resolved, the employee does not have to contact his or her employer again. If the parties are unable to resolve the issue on their own, and if the employee has provided all the required information on the Claim Form, the matter is assigned to an employment standards officer for investigation.

The employment standards officer may conduct his or her investigation by telephone, through written correspondence, by visiting the employer's premises or by requiring the employee and/or the employer to attend a meeting. During an investigation, both parties have the opportunity to present the facts and arguments they believe are important to their case. If a claim has been submitted against the client of a temporary help agency regarding a possible reprisal or unpaid wages, employment standards officers have the same powers of investigation with respect to the client as they do for an employer.

The officer will make a decision based on the best available evidence which may include employer records, client records, employee records, and interviews. After investigating a claim, the employment standards officer makes a decision about whether the employer has or has not followed the Act; If the officer finds that the employer has complied with the Act :

- The employee is notified in writing of this decision and can apply for a review within 30 days. If the officer finds that the employer has not complied with the Act :
- The employer or the client of a temporary help agency may resolve the issue by voluntarily complying with the officer's decision (i.e., by paying money that is owing to an employee or employees, or by adopting new, or changing existing, workplace practices).
- Issue an order against the employer. (For more information, see "Enforcement", below.)
- Officers can also require an employer to post a notice containing specific information about administration or enforcement of the Act, and/or a copy of the report or part of the report with the officer's findings.

The ESA gives the Ministry of Labour the authority to audit firms when investigating ESA complaints. One small business owner complained that the Ministry treated him as though he was a criminal when investigating a complaint against his firm over unpaid wages.

== See also ==
- Downtown Eatery (1993) v Ontario
