= Non est factum =

Defence in contract law

Non est factum (Latin for "[it] is not [my] deed") is a defence in contract law that allows a signing party to escape performance of an agreement "which is fundamentally different from what he or she intended to execute or sign". A claim of non est factum means that the signature on the contract was signed by mistake, without knowledge of its meaning. A successful plea would make the contract void ab initio.

According to Saunders v Anglia Building Society [1971] AC 1004, applied in Petelin v Cullen [1975], the strict requirements necessary for a successful plea are generally that:

- The person pleading non est factum must belong to "class of persons, who through no fault of their own, are unable to have any understanding of the purpose of the particular document because of blindness, illiteracy or some other disability". The disability must be one requiring the reliance on others for advice as to what they are signing.
- The "signatory must have made a fundamental mistake as to the nature of the contents of the document being signed", including its practical effects.
- The document must have been radically different from one intended to be signed.

Non est factum is difficult to claim as it does not allow for negligence on the part of the signatory; i.e. failure to read a contract before signing it, or carelessness, will not allow for non est factum. Furthermore, the Court has noted that there is a heavy onus that must be discharged to establish this defence as it is an "exceptional defence".

== Notable examples ==
In the Australian case Petelin v Cullen (1975), the defendant, Petelin, was illiterate and could speak very little English, but still signed a document he believed to be a receipt for $50 but which actually gave Cullen the option to purchase Petelin's land, which he exercised. Petelin refused to sign the contract for sale, alleging he had been deceived, and Cullen sought specific performance. The High Court of Australia found that because of Petelin's mistaken belief which was not because of his carelessness, his claim of non est factum was successful. The court noted that even if he had been careless, "Cullen was not an 'innocent person without knowledge or reason to doubt the validity of the appellant's signature'".

In the English case of Lloyds Bank v Waterhouse a father acted as a guarantor to his son's debt when purchasing a farm. The father was illiterate and signed the bank document under the belief that he was acting as the guarantor for the farm only, when the contract was actually for all the debt accumulated by the son. As he was illiterate, this was a mistake as to the document signed and the father was successful in claiming non est factum.

In the English case of Foster v Mackinnon, an elderly man signed a bill of exchange but was only shown the back of it. He was granted a new trial.

Illustratively, in the New South Wales case Ford v Perpetual Trustees Victoria Ltd, the son of Mr. Ford (Appellant) had arranged a loan from a bank to arrange for the purchase of a cleaning business, by using his father's residential property as security. When he defaulted, the bank sought to enforce its rights under the loan and mortgage agreements. Because Mr Ford was illiterate (though capable of signing his name), suffered from a "significant congenital intellectual impairment" and had no understanding of the particulars of the agreement or consequences of non-payment, the judge at appeal found that he had been the pawn of his son throughout, and "his mind was a mere channel through which the will of his son operated". The Court dismissed the argument that the appellant had been careless as that would presume that he was capable of turning his mind to the issue and making judgements. It ruled that Mr Ford lacked legal capacity, and therefore contract was void for non est factum. This example illustrates an application of Petelin v Cullen [1975] as it depicts the necessary level of incapacity and level of misunderstanding required to shift the heavy burden of the party raising the defence.
