= Unenforceable =

Contract which a court will not enforce

An unenforceable contract or transaction is one that is valid but one the court will not enforce. Unenforceable is usually used in contradiction to void (or void ab initio) and voidable. If the parties perform the agreement, it will be valid, but the court will not compel them if they do not.

An "agreement to agree", where a purported contract contains an obligation to enter into a subsequent agreement in the future, the terms of which are not certain at the time of the initial agreement, is generally considered to lack sufficient certainty to constitute a legally enforceable contract and is therefore unenforceable. However, an agreement under which "the parties contemplate entering into a further, more formal, agreement later" may be enforceable.

== Prostitution ==
An example of a transaction which is an unenforceable contract is a contract for prostitution under English law. Prostitution is not actually a crime under English law, but both soliciting a prostitute and living off the earnings of a prostitute are criminal offences. Yet so long as the contract is fully performed, it remains valid. However, if either refuses to complete the bargain (either the prostitute after being paid or the payer after receiving the services), the court will not assist the disappointed party.

Sometimes, contracts may be enforceable one way and unenforceable the other way. Again, there is an example from the field of prostitution. In Germany, where prostitution is also legal, a law exists that – once a contract has been entered into – makes a prostitute's demands for payment legally enforceable (even via collection agencies and courts if necessary), but the client's demands for fulfillment of the contract and rendition of sexual services would be unenforceable. German lawmakers made only the claims of prostitutes enforceable because they intended for German prostitution law to protect only prostitutes, without helping or furthering the interests of buyers of sexual services.

== Restrictive covenants ==
In many jurisdictions, racially or ethnically restrictive covenants excluding disfavored groups such as Blacks or Jews were common until the 1940s. These were ruled unconstitutional in 1948 in the Shelley v. Kraemer case and therefore legally unenforceable.

== Impugning a contract ==
To impugn a contract means attacking the integrity of the contract. A way it can be done is by deeming the contract unenforceable. A contract can be said unenforceable if it goes against the statutes of fraud or the Statement of Goods Act.

== See also ==
- Contract
- Unenforced law
