= Judicial review in Bangladesh =

The term judicial review is not expressly used in Bangladeshi law, but Article 102 of the Constitution of Bangladesh allows writ petitions to be filed to the High Court Division for reviewing the actions of public authorities, or suspending proceedings in lower courts. The article has caused significant judicial activism in Bangladesh.

In the 1970s, Article 102 was employed by the courts to set a precedent for invalidating detentions under the Special Powers Act, 1974. The courts have struck down constitutional amendments and enforced democratic local government under Article 102. The scope of such judicial review has expanded greatly since Justice Mustafa Kamal formally accepted public interest litigation for the first time in 1996, allowing associations and NGOs espousing the public's cause to file for judicial review.

== Powers under Article 102 ==
Article 102 of the Bangladeshi constitution gives discretionary powers to the High Court Division to issue orders. These include court orders (stay orders, quashing orders, mandatory orders, prohibiting orders), injunctions, declarations and damages. The text of Article 102 is quoted in the following.

- (1) The High Court Division on the application of any person aggrieved, may give such directions or orders to any person or authority, including any person performing any function in connection with the affairs of the Republic, as may be appropriate for the enforcement of any of the fundamental rights conferred by Part III of this Constitution.
- (2) The High Court Division may, if satisfied that no other equally efficacious remedy is provided by law –
- (a) on the application of any person aggrieved, make an order-
- (i) directing a person performing any functions in connection with the affairs of the Republic or of a local authority, to refrain from doing that which he is not permitted by law to do or to do that which he is required by law to do; or
- (ii) declaring that any act done or proceeding taken by a person performing functions in connection with the affairs of the Republic or of a local authority, has been done or taken without lawful authority and is of no legal effect; or
- (b) on the application of any person, make an order –
- (i) directing that a person in custody be brought before it so that it may satisfy itself that he is not being held in custody without lawful authority or in an unlawful manner; or
- (ii) requiring a person holding or purporting to hold a public office to show under what authority he claims to hold that office.
- (3) Notwithstanding anything contained in the forgoing clauses, the High Court Division shall have no power under this article to pass any interim or other order in relation to any law to which article 47 applies.
- (4) Whereon an application made under clause (1) or sub-clause (a) of clause (2), an interim order is prayed for and such interim order is likely to have the effect of –
- (a) prejudicing or interfering with any measure designed to implement any development programme, or any development work; or
- (b) being otherwise harmful to the public interest, the High Court Division shall not make an interim order unless the Attorney-General has been given reasonable notice of the application and he (or an advocate authorised by him in that behalf) has been given an opportunity of being heard, and the High Court Division is satisfied that the interim order would not have the effect referred to in sub-clause (a) or sub-clause (b).
- (5) In this article, unless the context otherwise requires, "person" includes a statutory public authority and any court or tribunal, other than a court or tribunal established under a law relating to the defence services of Bangladesh or any disciplined force or a tribunal to which article 117 applies.

== Lower courts ==
The High Court Division often issues stay orders on the proceedings of lower courts, if it finds cases to be politically motivated or against judicial conscience. It can also issue a quashing order to end the proceedings.

== Constitutional review ==
Article 102 has been applied in enforcing fundamental rights, the separation of powers, declaring martial law illegal and quashing constitutional amendments. In Kudrat-E-Elahi Panir and others v. Government of Bangladesh, the court struck down an Ordinance ending democratic representation in Upazila Parishads and vesting all powers with the government. It reinforced that local government must include elected representatives, as set forth in the Constitution. In its judgement, the court ruled that constitutional amendments fall under the purview of judicial review. In Secretary, Ministry of Finance v Masdar Hossain, the court curbed the government's power in judicial appointments and ordered for the creation of the Bangladesh Judicial Service Commission. In Bangladesh Italian Marble Works Ltd. v. Government of Bangladesh, the court ruled against military rule and martial law, while at the same time restoring some secularist clauses of the original 1972 constitution.

In 2017, the sixteenth amendment to the Bangladeshi constitution was scrapped by the Supreme Court.

== Administrative review ==
In Aruna Sen v. Government of Bangladesh, the court set a precedent for nullifying detentions under the Special Powers Act, 1974. In Abdul Latif Mirza v. Government of Bangladesh, it asserted that natural justice was a well-established part of Bangladeshi law. Unlike Malaysia and Sri Lanka, where subjective satisfaction has been sufficient for detention orders, the Bangladeshi apex court has asserted that there must be an objective basis to detention without trial.

Bangladeshi courts have adopted the doctrine of legitimate expectation developed in Britain and used in other Commonwealth countries. The doctrine seeks to prevent abuse of power and irrationality, and assert principles of natural justice and fairness. In Bangladesh Biman Corporation v. Rabia Bashri Irene, the court ruled that a state-owned corporation cannot discriminate against one set of employees while providing more opportunities to another set of employees, while both sets are promised with the same legitimate expectations. In Md. Shamsul Huda and others v. Bangladesh, the court ruled against the government for not consulting the Chief Justice, as was the practice for thirty years, on the appointment of ten additional judges. In Bangladesh Soy-Protein Project Ltd v. Ministry of Disaster Management and Relief, the court ruled that the government was wrong to discontinue a school feeding program, when there was legitimate expectation not only from the contractual party, but millions of malnourished children.

== Public interest litigation ==
Public interest litigation was formally accepted in 1996 in Mohiuddin Farooque v. Government of Bangladesh. The petitioner, who was the Secretary General of the Bangladesh Environmental Lawyers Association, asked the court to instruct the government to enforce environmental policies in Tangail district, where industries were risking flood control. While accepting the petition, Justice Mustafa Kamal commented that “when a public injury or public wrong or an infraction of a fundamental right affecting an indeterminate number of people is involved, any member of the public, being a citizen, or an indigenous association, espousing the public cause, has the right to invoke the Court's jurisdiction”.

In 2008, the Supreme Court ruled that the stranded Pakistani community be given citizenship, the right to vote and National ID cards.

In Md. Abdul Hakim v. Government of Bangladesh, a case involving a madrasa, the court explored the possibility of private bodies coming under the purview of judicial review. The madrasa's managing committee, however, was approved by the government. Hence, the particular private body was linked to the government.

== See also ==
- Marbury v. Madison
- Judicial review in the United States
