= Eastern South Asia =

Subregion of South Asia

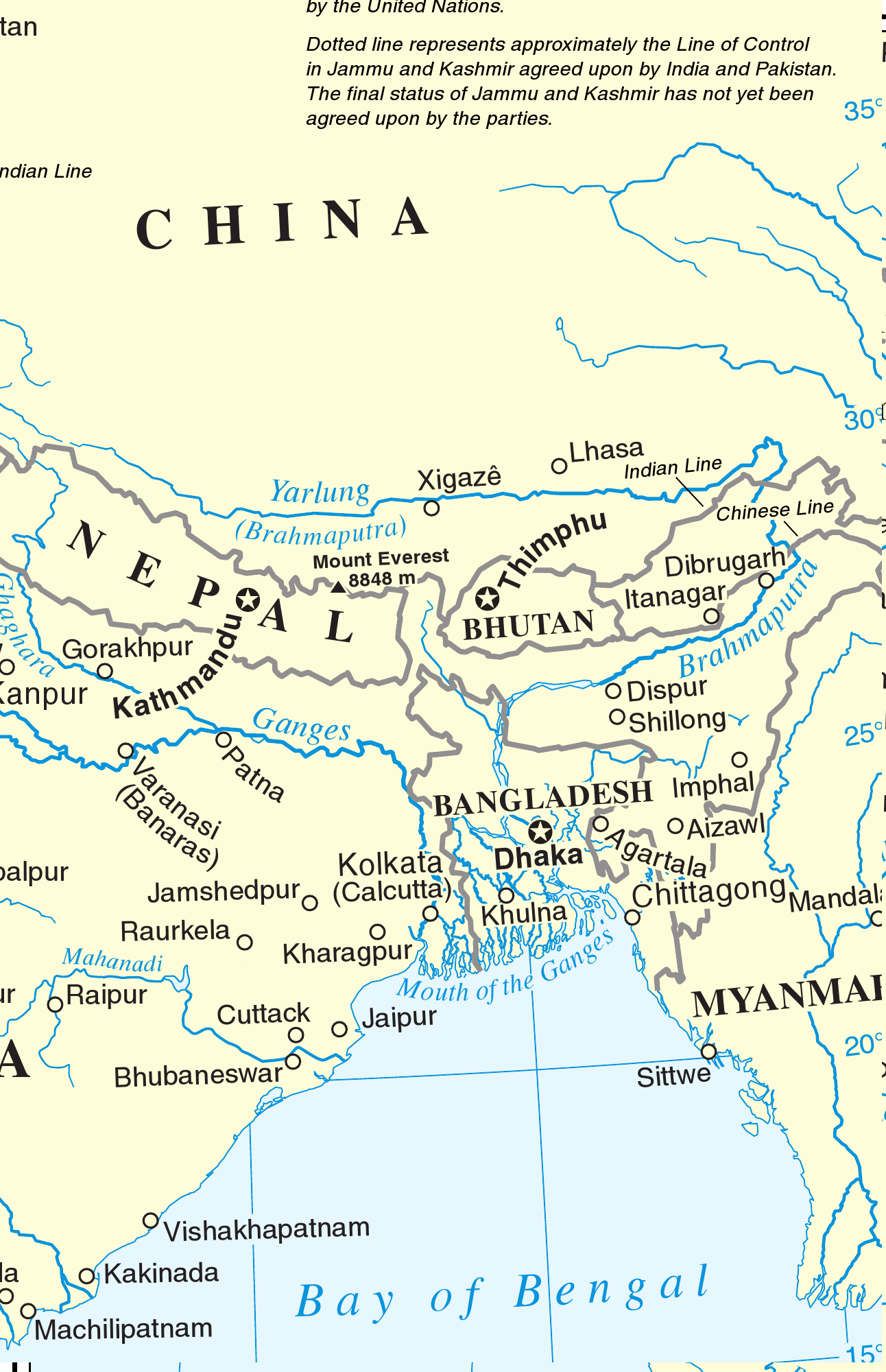
- Countries: Bangladesh; Bhutan; India (East India and Northeast India); Nepal
- Population: 441 million
- Languages: Assamese, Bengali, Bodo, Bhojpuri, Chittagonian, Dzongkha, Garo, Hindi, Kamtapuri, Khasi, Kokborok, Kurukh, Lepcha, Limbu, Maithili, Magahi, Meitei, Mizo, Nepali, Odia, Sadri, Santali, Sikkimese, Sylheti
- Time Zones: UTC+05:30, UTC+05:45, UTC+06:00

Eastern South Asia is a subregion of South Asia. It includes the countries of Bangladesh, Bhutan, India (specifically East India and Northeast India), and Nepal. Geographically, it lies between the Eastern Himalayas and the Bay of Bengal. Two of the world's largest rivers, the Ganges and the Brahmaputra, flow into the sea through Eastern South Asia. The region includes the world's highest mountainous terrain and the world's largest delta, and has a climate ranging from alpine and subalpine to subtropical and tropical. Since Nepal, Bhutan, and northeast India are landlocked, the coastlines of Bangladesh and East India serve as the principal gateways to the region.

With more than 441 million inhabitants, Eastern South Asia is home to 6% of the world's population and 25% of South Asia's population. The Bangladesh, Bhutan, India, Nepal Initiative promotes economic integration in the region. The four countries are members of the South Asian Association for Regional Cooperation and the Bay of Bengal Initiative for Multi-Sectoral Technical and Economic Cooperation. Yunnan Province and the Tibet Autonomous Region of the People's Republic of China (PRC) and Myanmar are historically, economically, and culturally interdependent on Eastern South Asia. The Bangladesh–China–India–Myanmar Forum has established an economic corridor in the region.

== History ==
=== Archaeology ===
Eastern South Asia's archaeological heritage includes Lumbini, the birthplace of the Buddha; the ancient universities and monasteries of Nalanda, Vikramshila, Somapura Mahavihara, Jaggadala, Odantapuri and Mainamati; the Ashokan pillars and the Mauryan Empire-era cities of Pataliputra, champa, Vaishali, Balirajpur, Rajgir, Sisupalgarh, Kalinga and Mahasthangarh; and the ruined fort cities of Wari-Bateshwar, Bhitagarh, and Chandraketugarh. The region has an important Buddhist Tourist Circuit. Eastern South Asia hosts a large number of medieval and early modern mosques, including Adina Mosque, the subcontinent's largest medieval mosque, and the Sixty Dome Mosque, and large caravansaries such as Bara Katra and Katra Masjid. It is home to several outstanding examples of medieval and early modern Hindu temple architecture, particularly the Newa architecture of Nepal and the architecture of Bengal.

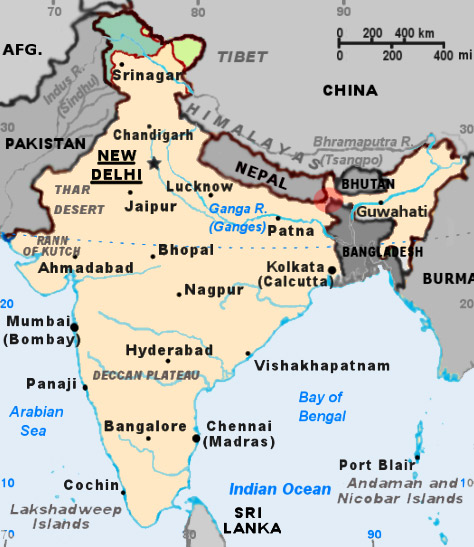
A map showing the Siliguri corridor (Chicken's Neck corridor) between India, Bangladesh, Nepal and Bhutan

=== Old kingdoms ===
Eastern South Asia is a cradle of South Asian civilisation. Historical states in the region include those recorded in Indian epics such as the Mahabharata, including ancient Nepal, Vanga, and Pundra; the Greek and Roman recorded kingdom of Gangaridai; major Hindu and Buddhist kingdoms including Kikata, Videha, Vṛji, Magadha, Nanda, Mauryan, Anga, Kalinga, Kamarupa, Samatata, Kanva, Gupta, Pala, Gauda, Sena, Khadga, Candra, Deva, Tripura, and Cooch Behar State. Major Islamic empires in the region included the Delhi and Bengal Sultanates, and the Suri and Mughal Empires (including the important province of Mughal Bengal). A confederation of Muslim and Hindu aristocrats called the Baro-Bhuyan existed in the late 16th and early 17th centuries.

=== Bengal Presidency ===
The Bengal Presidency was established in the 18th century by the British Empire, with its headquarters in Fort William, in coastal southwestern Bengal. The British made Bengal the center of their Indian empire, during which Bengal became synonymous with India. Until the mid-19th century, the Bengal Presidency's jurisdiction covered British-controlled territories in north India, northeast India, and Southeast Asia.

The Governor of Bengal was concurrently the Governor General of India for many years. Fort William's surroundings grew into the port city of Calcutta, which was the capital of India until 1911. After the British Indian Empire was established in 1858 following the Indian Rebellion of 1857, the Bengal Renaissance flourished in Calcutta and other Bengali urban centers. The Indian independence movement, including parts of the movement which created Pakistan, had its origins in the Bengal Presidency. The Parliament of Bengal, including the Bengal Legislative Council and the Bengal Legislative Assembly, was the oldest and largest in British India.

The Bengal Presidency had the highest gross domestic product in British India.

=== Partition of Bengal ===
Citing administrative improvement and affirmative action for Bengali Muslims and non-Bengali communities in colonial Assam, the British government enacted the first partition of Bengal in 1905. The new province of Eastern Bengal and Assam, with its own Legislative Council, saw more investments in education and infrastructure. The province was a center of the petroleum, tea, and jute industries. Its capital was Dacca, with a summer capital at Shillong. The summer capital enjoyed the highest per capita income in British India. The All India Muslim League was formed in Dacca to safeguard the interests of British Indian Muslims. But the first partition sparked strong protests from elites in Calcutta and sections of the landed gentry, particularly Bengali Hindus. The protests caused a pan-Indian political crisis. In 1912, East Bengal was reunited with West Bengal as Bengal Province while Assam was separated as Assam Province.

The first partition left a strong legacy. Decades later in the 1940s, when Hindu–Muslim relations deteriorated, the British government again partitioned Bengal into East Bengal and West Bengal as part of the Partition of British India. East Bengal was made part of the Muslim-majority Dominion of Pakistan and West Bengal a part of the Hindu-majority Dominion of India. East Bengal was later renamed East Pakistan in 1955.

In 1971, East Pakistan seceded in the Bangladesh Liberation War, which established the People's Republic of Bangladesh. The constitution of Bangladesh established a multiparty parliamentary democracy in 1972. The country endured several military coups in the late 1970s and 1980s. Islam is the state religion of Bangladesh. In the Indian state of West Bengal, the Communist Party of India governed for three decades.

=== Himalayan states ===
The Eastern Himalayas has been home to three independent kingdoms since the 17th century, including the Kingdom of Bhutan, the Kingdom of Sikkim, and the Kingdom of Nepal. The Himalayan kingdoms served as buffer states between Imperial China and India. In the 19th century, Nepal, Sikkim, and Bhutan became protectorates of British India. The Anglo-Nepal Treaty of 1923 recognised Nepal's sovereignty. The treaty was recorded in the League of Nations. Bhutan's relations with British India were managed under the Treaty of Punakha of 1910. Sikkim's relations with British India were managed under the Treaty of Titalia of 1817 and the Treaty of Tumlong of 1861.

After India became independent, it signed a treaty with Bhutan in 1949, and, in 1950, a treaty with Nepal and a treaty with Sikkim. The Annexation of Tibet by the People's Republic of China, particularly after the 1959 Tibetan uprising, caused an exodus of Tibetan refugees into Northern and Eastern South Asia, including into Nepal and Bhutan.

Refugees included the spiritual Tibetan head of state, the Dalai Lama, who established the Tibetan government in exile in India. The CIA Tibetan program in Nepal trained Tibetan refugees for guerrilla war against the PRC. Following the Tibetan crisis, India and the PRC engaged in a brief border war in 1962 over the disputed McMahon Line and Aksai Chin areas. In 1975, the Indian annexation of Sikkim was strongly opposed by China.

Nepal's first period of parliamentary democracy lasted from 1950 to 1960. The King of Nepal imposed the panchayat system in the 1960s and 1970s. A mass uprising pressured the King of Nepal to restore democracy in 1990. The Nepalese Civil War began in 1992.

Bhutan joined the United Nations in 1971. Bhutan was the first country to recognise the independence of Bangladesh.

=== Indian northeast ===
Colonial Assam was reorganised by the Indian government into the Seven Sister States of northeast India, including Arunachal Pradesh, Assam, Manipur, Meghalaya, Mizoram, Nagaland, and Tripura. Insurgency in Northeast India has been a security challenge for the Indian government. Since 1958, the Armed Forces Special Powers Act has been imposed in the region. The law has been described as perpetuating indirect military rule. There have been many allegations of human rights abuses in northeast India.

=== 21st century ===
In 2003, China acknowledged Sikkim as a part of India while India recognised Tibet as part of China. The Dalai Lama has often asserted that Tibet should be given meaningful autonomy within China, not independence. In 2005, the King of Nepal imposed direct rule, which led to the monarchy's overthrow, the end of the civil war, and the creation of the Federal Democratic Republic of Nepal in 2008. Bhutan held its first general election in 2008.

In 2011, India granted duty-free access to most Bangladeshi products. In 2012, India affirmed in principle to allow Bangladesh, Bhutan, and Nepal to transit its territory for trade movement. In 2014, Bangladesh and India resolved their maritime boundary dispute at a UN tribunal.

In 2015, India and Bangladesh signed a land boundary agreement to resolve border disputes. In 2014 Bangladesh and Bhutan signed a trade agreement in which Bhutan gained duty-free access for 90 products in the Bangladeshi market. Bangladesh, India, Nepal, and Bhutan signed a regional motor vehicle agreement in 2015.

The four countries have agreed to develop hydropower in the Himalayas. Bhutan and India have developed two hydropower projects, as of 2017.

Nepal has been a key participant in the Chinese One Belt, One Road initiative, which seeks to revive the historical Silk Road between South Asia and Tibet.

The rapid development of the Chinese economy has caused increased trade and economic activity between China and Eastern South Asia. China is the largest trading partner of India, Bangladesh, and Nepal while Hong Kong is one of Bhutan's chief trading partners. The Indian economy has emerged as one of the world's fastest-growing economies although its eastern and northeastern states have had lower economic growth than northern, western, or southern India. According to the International Monetary Fund (IMF), the Bangladeshi economy was the world's second-fastest-growing major economy in 2016, but the country faces challenges of political instability and infrastructure shortages.

The 2017 China India border standoff developed on the Doklam plateau, located on the tri-nation border between Bhutan, Indian Sikkim, and Chinese Tibet.

== Geography and climate ==
=== Bangladesh ===
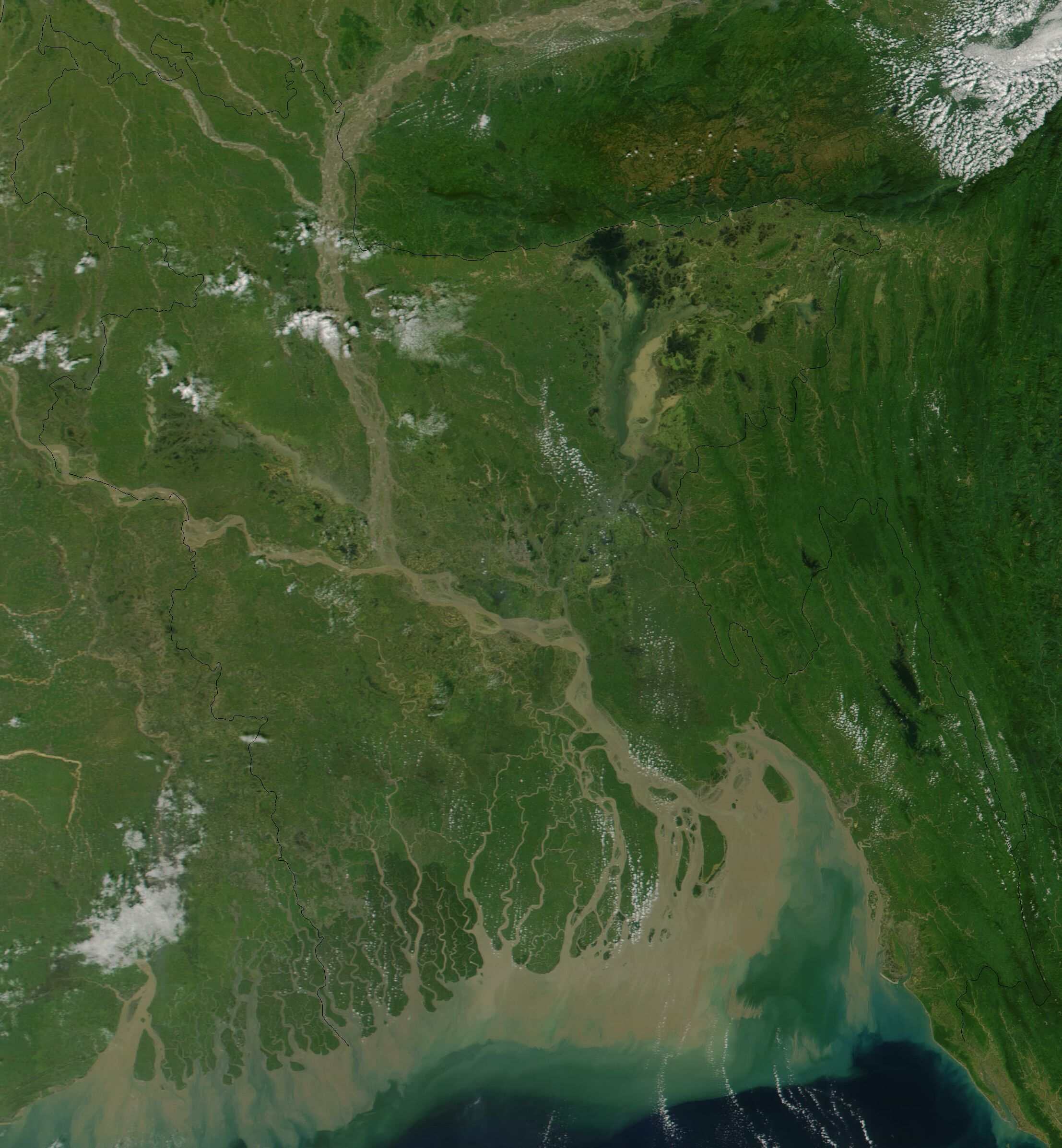
The river delta flowing into the Bay of Bengal in 2001

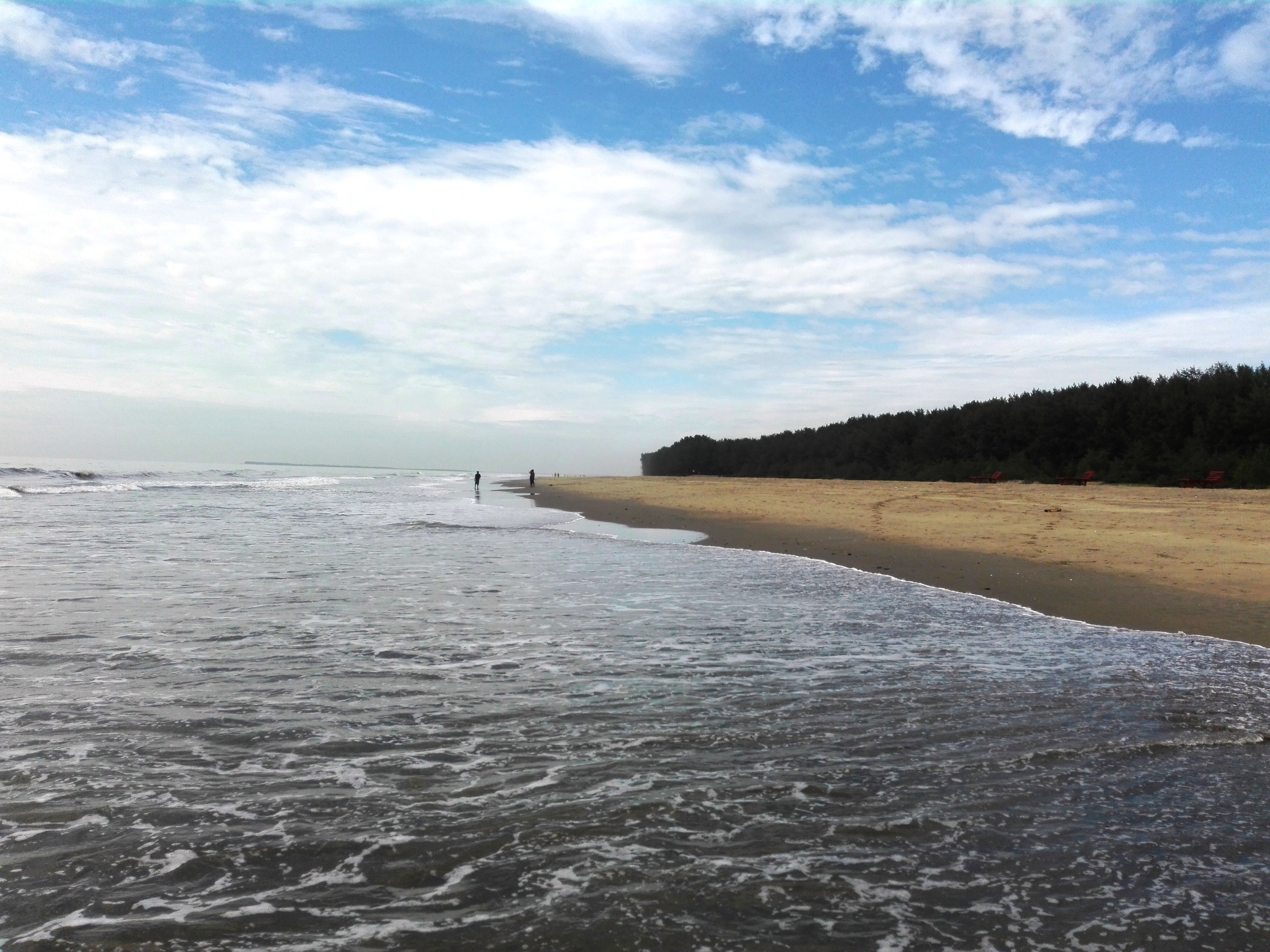
The longest beach in the world is located in Cox's Bazaar

The geography of Bangladesh is varied and has an area characterised by three distinct features: a broad deltaic plain subject to frequent flooding, elevated forested plateaus, and a small hilly region crossed by swiftly flowing rivers. The country has an area of 147,610 square kilometres (56,990 sq mi) and extends 820 kilometres (510 mi) north to south and 600 kilometres (370 mi) east to west. Bangladesh is bordered on the west, north, and east by a 4,095-kilometre (2,545 mi) land frontier with India and, in the southeast, by a short land and water frontier (193 kilometres (120 mi) with Burma (Myanmar). On the south is a highly irregular deltaic coastline of about 580 kilometres (360 mi), containing many parallel rivers and streams flowing into the Bay of Bengal. The territorial waters of Bangladesh extend 12 nautical miles (22 km; 14 mi), and the exclusive economic zone of the country is 200 nautical miles (370 km; 230 mi). Bangladesh has a tropical monsoon climate.

The Sundarbans in Bangladesh, which is shared with India, is a UNESCO World Heritage Site. Cox's Bazar Beach is one of the world's longest beaches.

=== Bhutan ===
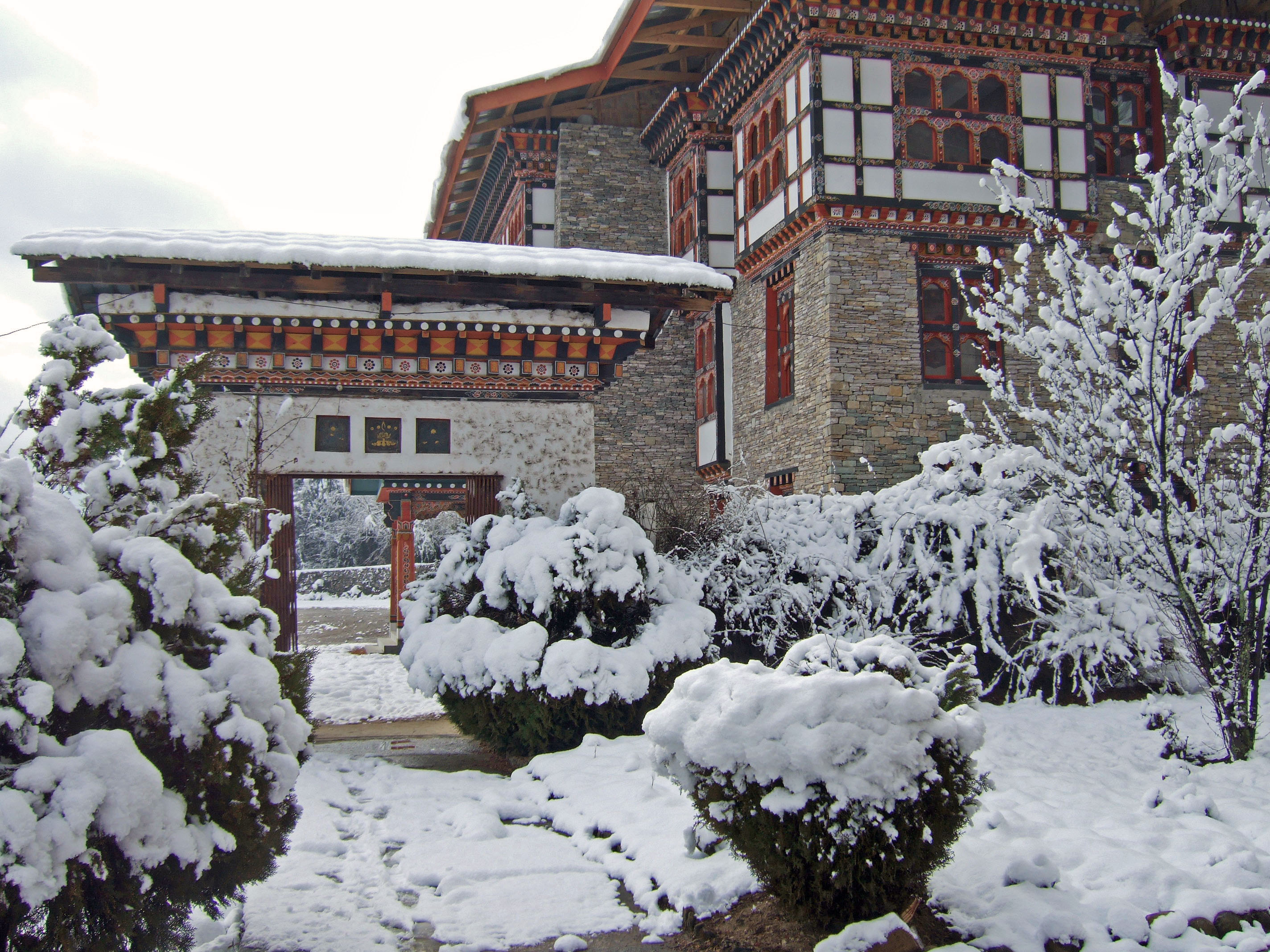
Snow in Thimphu. The picture was taken at the National Library of Bhutan

Bhutan is roughly the size of Switzerland. It is located on the southern slopes of the eastern Himalayas, landlocked between the Tibet Autonomous Region to the north and the Indian states of Sikkim, West Bengal, Assam, and Arunachal Pradesh to the west and south. The land consists mostly of steep and high mountains crisscrossed by a network of swift rivers, which form deep valleys before draining into the Indian plains. Elevation rises from 200 metres (660 ft) in the southern foothills to more than 7,000 metres (23,000 ft). The highest peak in Bhutan is Gangkhar Puensum at 7,570 metres (24,840 ft).

The climate in Bhutan varies with elevation, from subtropical in the south to temperate in central areas and alpine in the north, with year-round snow in the north. Western Bhutan has the heavier monsoon rains; southern Bhutan has hot humid summers and cool winters.

=== India ===
==== East India ====
The bulk of the East India region lies on the Indo-Gangetic Plain, with a coastline on the Bay of Bengal. It includes the states of West Bengal, Bihar, Jharkhand, and Odisha. The region is bounded by Nepal, Sikkim, and Bhutan in the north, Bangladesh in the east, the Indian states of Uttar Pradesh and Chhattisgarh on the west, and the Indian state of Andhra Pradesh in the south. It is connected to the Seven Sister States of Northeast India by the narrow Siliguri Corridor. West Bengal is on the eastern bottleneck of India, stretching from the Himalayas in the north, to the Bay of Bengal in the south. The region lies in the humid-subtropical zone.

==== Northeast India ====
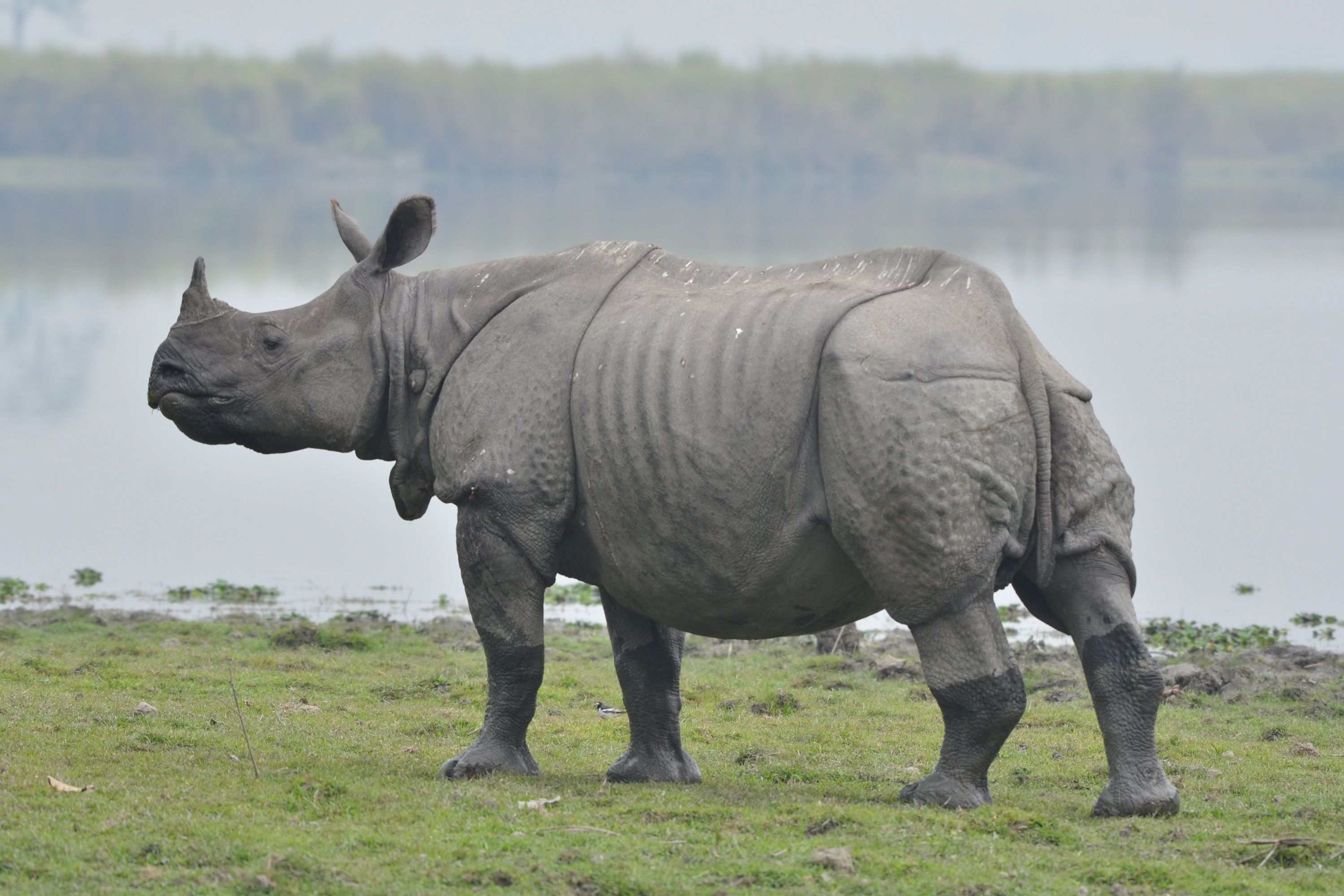
A rhinoceros in the Brahmaputra Valley, Assam

The landlocked region of Northeast India includes the states of Assam, Arunachal Pradesh, Mizoram, Manipur, Meghalaya, Nagaland, Sikkim, and Tripura. It has land borders with China, Myanmar, Bhutan, and Bangladesh. The region is usually categorised into the Eastern Himalaya and the Brahmaputra and the Barak Valley plains. Northeast India has a predominantly humid sub-tropical climate with hot, humid summers, severe monsoons, and mild winters. The region is covered by the mighty Brahmaputra–Barak River systems and their tributaries. Geographically, apart from the Brahmaputra, Barak, and Imphal valleys and some flat lands in between the hills of Meghalaya and Tripura, the remaining two-thirds of the area is hilly terrain interspersed with valleys and plains; the altitude varies from almost sea level to over 7,000 metres (23,000 ft) above mean sea level. The region's high rainfall, averaging around 10,000 millimetres (390 in) and above, creates problems of ecosystem, high seismic activity, and floods. The states of Arunachal Pradesh and Sikkim have a montane climate with cold, snowy winters and mild summers.

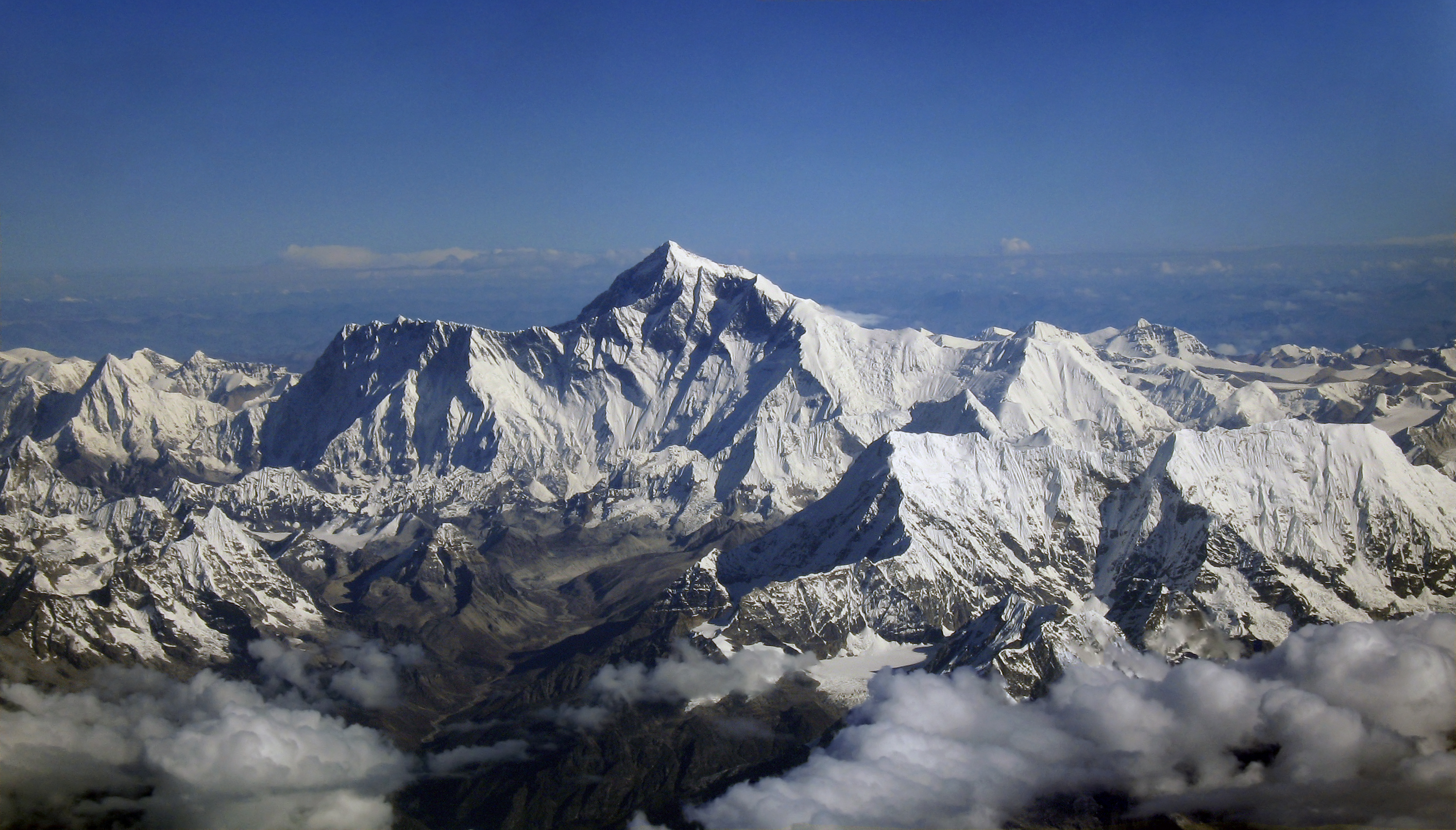
Mount Everest seen from the window of a plane flying over the Himalayas

=== Nepal ===
Nepal is the world's 93rd largest country. Nepal is commonly divided into three physiographic areas: mountain, hill, and southern lowland plains (the Terai). These ecological belts run east–west and are vertically intersected by Nepal's major, north to south-flowing river system. The southern lowland plains bordering India are part of the northern rim of the Indo-Gangetic Plain. The Hill Region (Pahad) abuts the mountains and varies from 800 to 4,000 metres (2,600 to 13,100 ft) in altitude with progression from subtropical climates below 1,200 metres (3,900 ft) to alpine climates above 3,600 metres (11,800 ft). The Lower Himalayan Range reaching 1,500 to 3,000 metres (4,900 to 9,800 ft) is the southern limit of this region, with subtropical river valleys and "hills" alternating to the north of this range. The Mountain Region (Himal), situated in the Great Himalayan Range, makes up the northern part of Nepal. It contains the highest elevations in the world, including eight of the ten highest mountains.

The climate of Nepal includes subtropical, temperate, subalpine and alpine zones.

== Demographics ==
Largest cities or towns in Eastern South Asia Bangladesh Bureau of Statistics, Census of India, Nepal Central Bureau of Statistics and others
Rank		Eastern South Asia	Pop.	Rank		Eastern South Asia	Pop.
1	Kolkata	India	14,112,536	11	Sylhet	Bangladesh	526,412
2	Dhaka	Bangladesh	8,906,039	12	Rajshahi	Bangladesh	451,425
3	Chittagong	Bangladesh	2,592,439
4	Patna	India	2,049,156
5	Asansol	India	1,243,008
6	Kathmandu	Nepal	1,003,285
7	Guwahati	India	962,334
8	Bhubaneshwar	India	837,456
9	Siliguri	India	705,579
10	Khulna	Bangladesh	664,728

=== Bangladesh ===
Bangladesh is the world's eighth most populous country, with a population of more than 160 million. Bengalis are the largest ethnic group, with Bengali Muslim a majority, followed by Bengali Hindus, Bengali Buddhists, and Bengali Christians. The country has a significant Urdu-speaking minority and numerous minority indigenous ethnic groups. The Bengali language is the official language. Dhaka, Chittagong, Khulna, Sylhet, and Rajshahi are among the country's largest cities and towns. Bangladesh's life expectancy is ranked third in South Asia.

=== Bhutan ===
Bhutan has the second-smallest population in South Asia after the Maldives. Bhutan's three main ethnic groups are the Ngalop, Sharchop, and Lhotshampa. The state religion is Buddhism. The official language is Dzongkha. Bhutan has a significant Nepali-speaking minority. Thimphu and Phuntsholing are the largest cities.

=== India ===
With an estimated population of 226 million, East India has a multi-lingual and multi-ethnic Indo-Aryan population. Kolkata, Patna, Asansol, Durgapur, Bhubaneshwar, Siliguri and Darjeeling are among the area's largest cities. Northeast India has a population of 45 million. It has a multi-ethnic Tibeto-Burman and Austric population, except in Bengali-majority Tripura. Guwahati, Agartala, Shillong, Imphal, Aizawl, and Gangtok are the major towns and cities. Hindi and English are the federal official languages of India while most states also have their own official language.

=== Nepal ===
Nepal has a population of 25 million, which is the world's 41st largest. Nepal is a multiethnic Himalayan nation with Nepali as the official language.

== Economy ==
=== Bangladesh ===
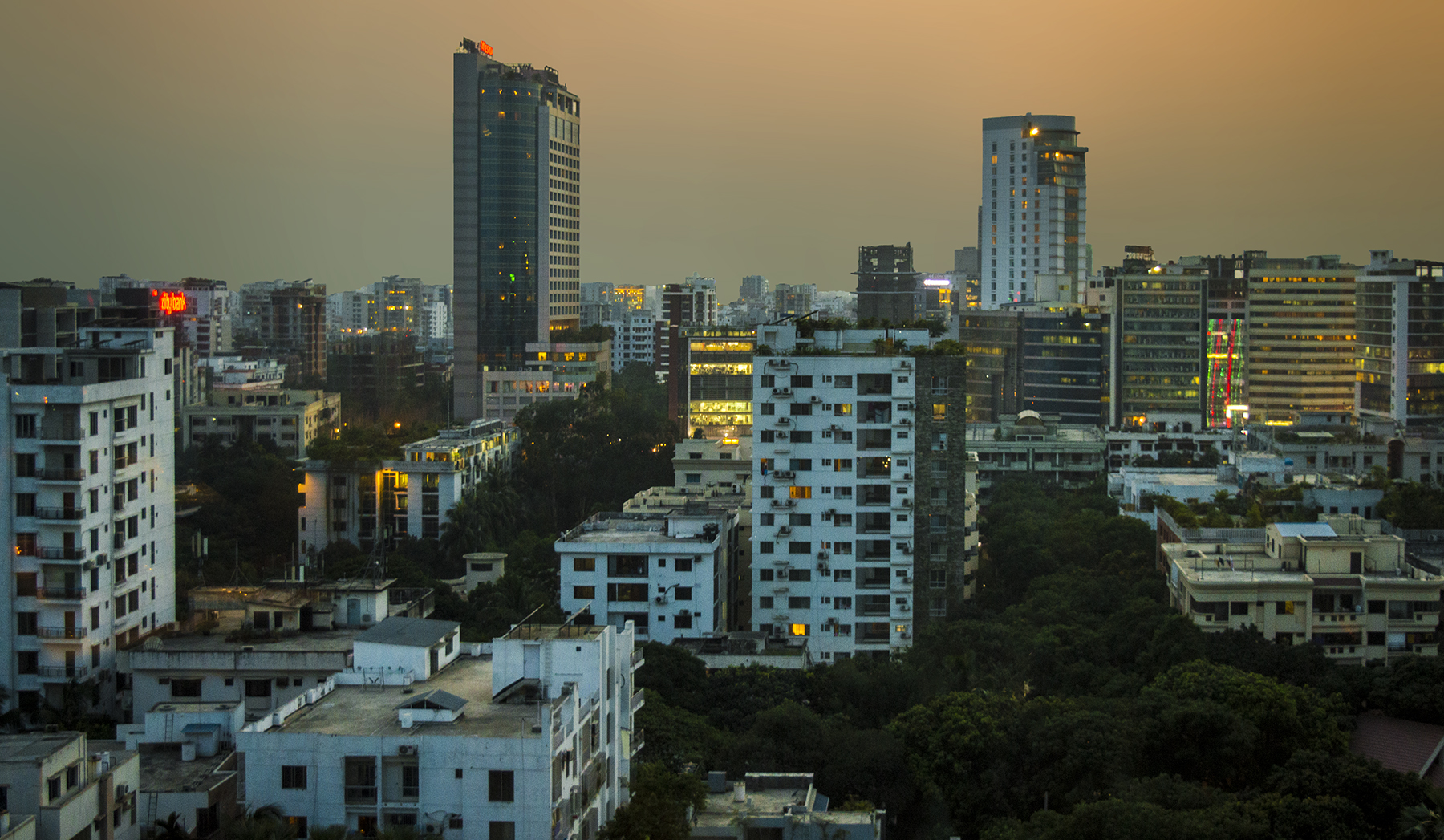
Dhaka, the commercial and financial hub of the country, is a major business center in South Asia and the largest economic centre in Eastern South Asia

Listed as one of the Next Eleven, the economy of Bangladesh ranks 39th in terms of nominal gross domestic product (GDP) and 29th in terms of purchasing power parity (PPP). In the fiscal year 2018–2019, Bangladesh registered exports worth US$40.53 billion and imports worth US$55.44 billion. Its major trading partners include the European Union, the United States, China, India, Japan, Australia, Malaysia, and Singapore. The Port of Chittagong is Bangladesh's busiest port, as well as the busiest in Eastern South Asia. Bangladesh's chief export is textiles. It is the world's second-largest textile exporter after China. It is largely self-sufficient in pharmaceuticals, shipbuilding, steel rods, ceramics, glass, food, and numerous other sectors. Bangladesh has significant natural gas, limestone, and coal reserves. The jute trade has been historically important. Bangladesh's financial sector is one of the largest in South Asia along with those of India and Pakistan. The Dhaka Stock Exchange and Chittagong Stock Exchange are its principal capital markets.

Bangladesh has the second-largest foreign exchange reserves in South Asia. Its credit rating is also the second-best in the region after India.

The Nepal Bangladesh Bank was set up by Bangladesh's IFIC Bank in neighbouring Nepal.

=== Bhutan ===
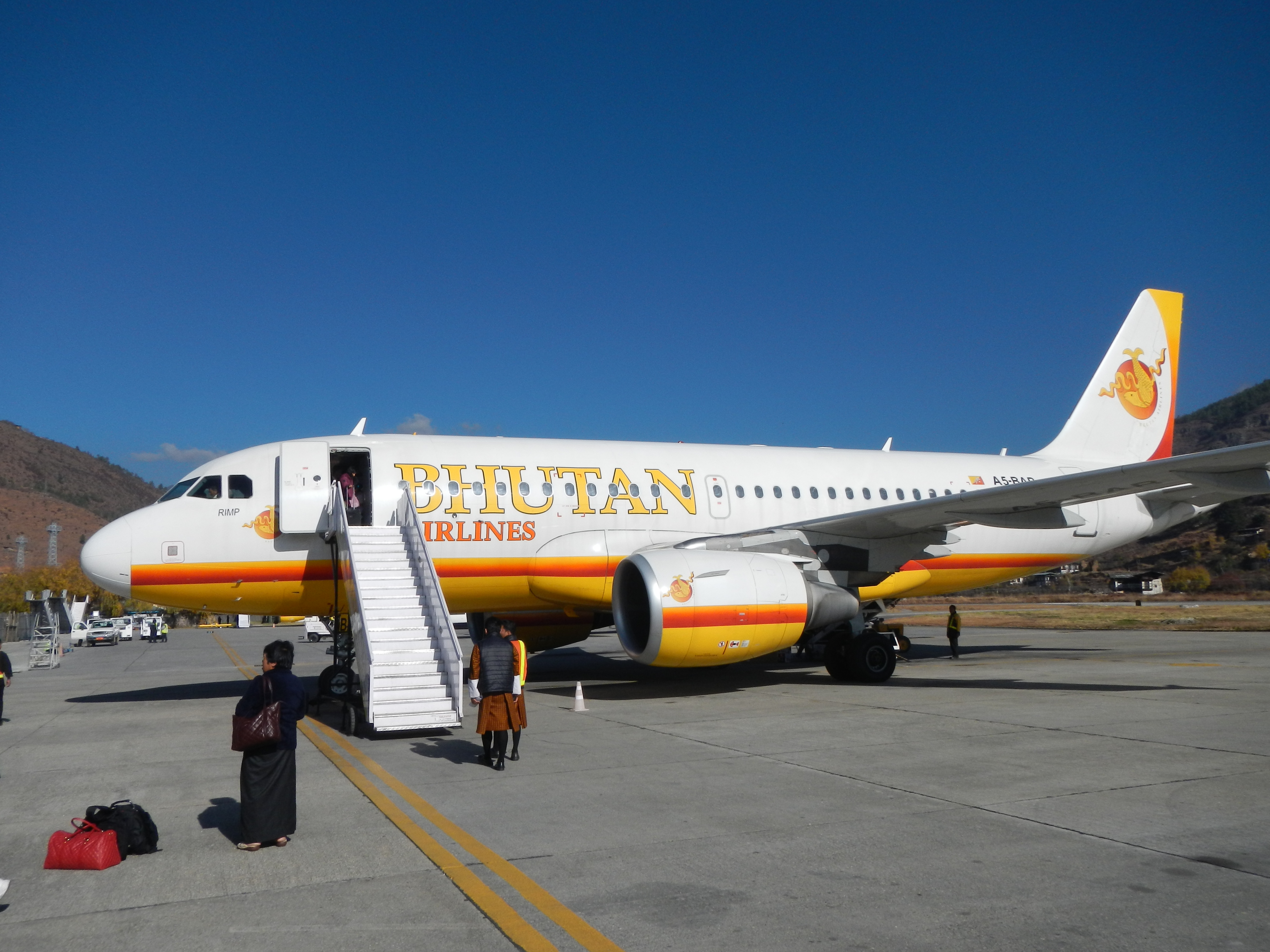
Bhutan Airlines is owned by the Tashi Group, Bhutan's largest conglomerate.

The economy of Bhutan is notable for its hydropower, ferroalloys, apples, red rice, construction materials, and tourism sectors. Bhutan's main trading partners are India, Bangladesh, Thailand, Hong Kong, Japan and South Korea. Phuntsholing is Bhutan's financial center. The Royal Securities Exchange of Bhutan is the main stock exchange. The Bank of Bhutan and the Bhutan National Bank are the largest financial institutions. The SAARC Development Fund is based in Thimphu.

Bhutan ranks first in economic freedom and ease of doing business, is second in per capita income, and is the least corrupt country in South Asia.

=== India ===
East India's Jharkhand and Odisha states have rich mineral deposits. East India is also notable for Darjeeling tea. Northeast India has one of the world's oldest petroleum and tea industries. Tourism is also important for the region's economy. Kolkata is the principal financial center of eastern and northeastern India, being home to the Calcutta Stock Exchange. The Port of Kolkata is the region's principal gateway and is also used by Nepal and Bhutan. The port of Haldia is a hub of heavy industry. The Guwahati Tea Auction Centre is important for the region's tea industry. Jute is a major crop, as in neighbouring Bangladesh.

A cross-border conveyor belt carries limestone from mines in Meghalaya, India, to Sylhet Division, Bangladesh, to supply a Lafarge cement plant.

=== Nepal ===
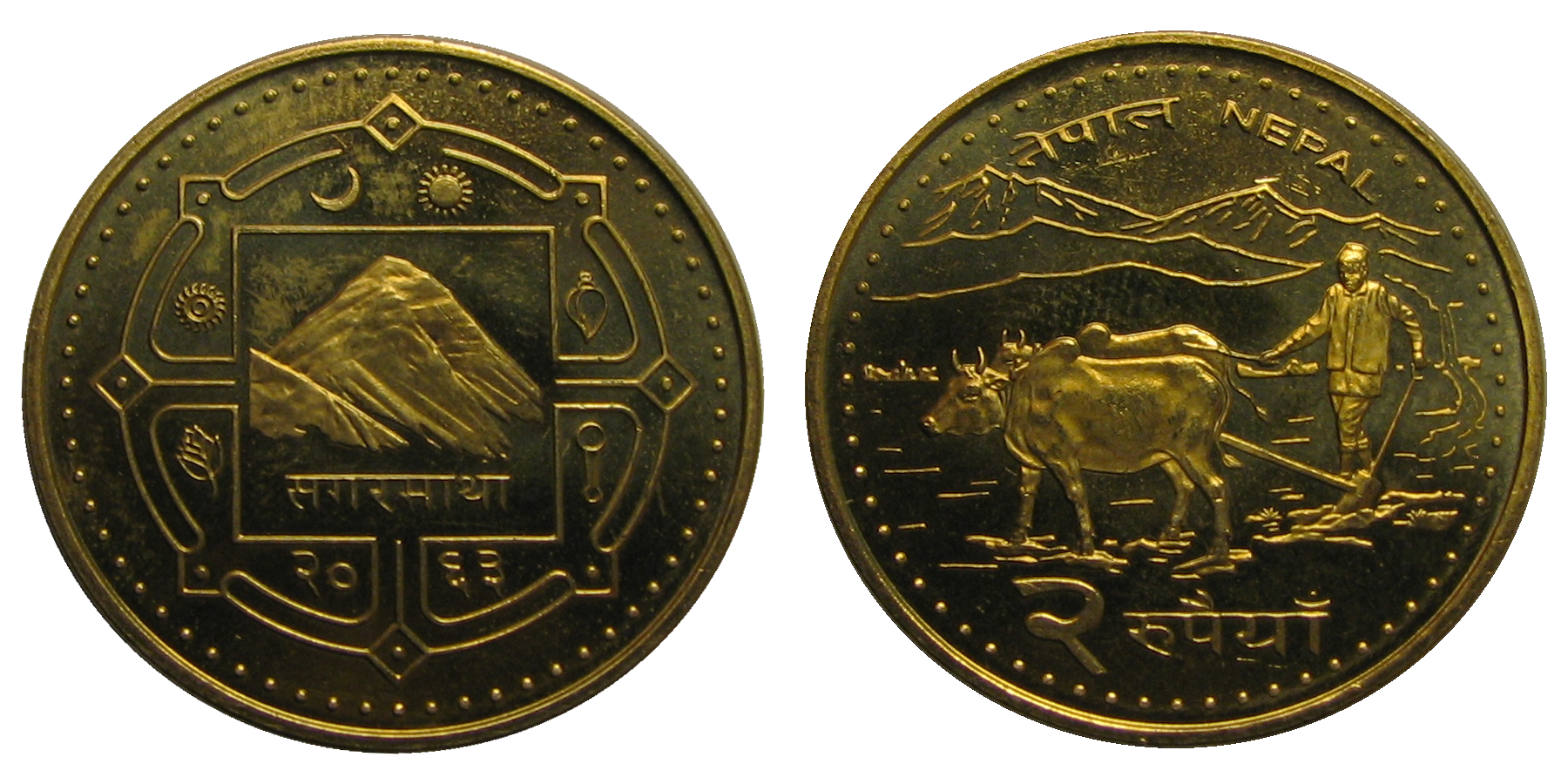
Two sides of a Nepalese rupee coin

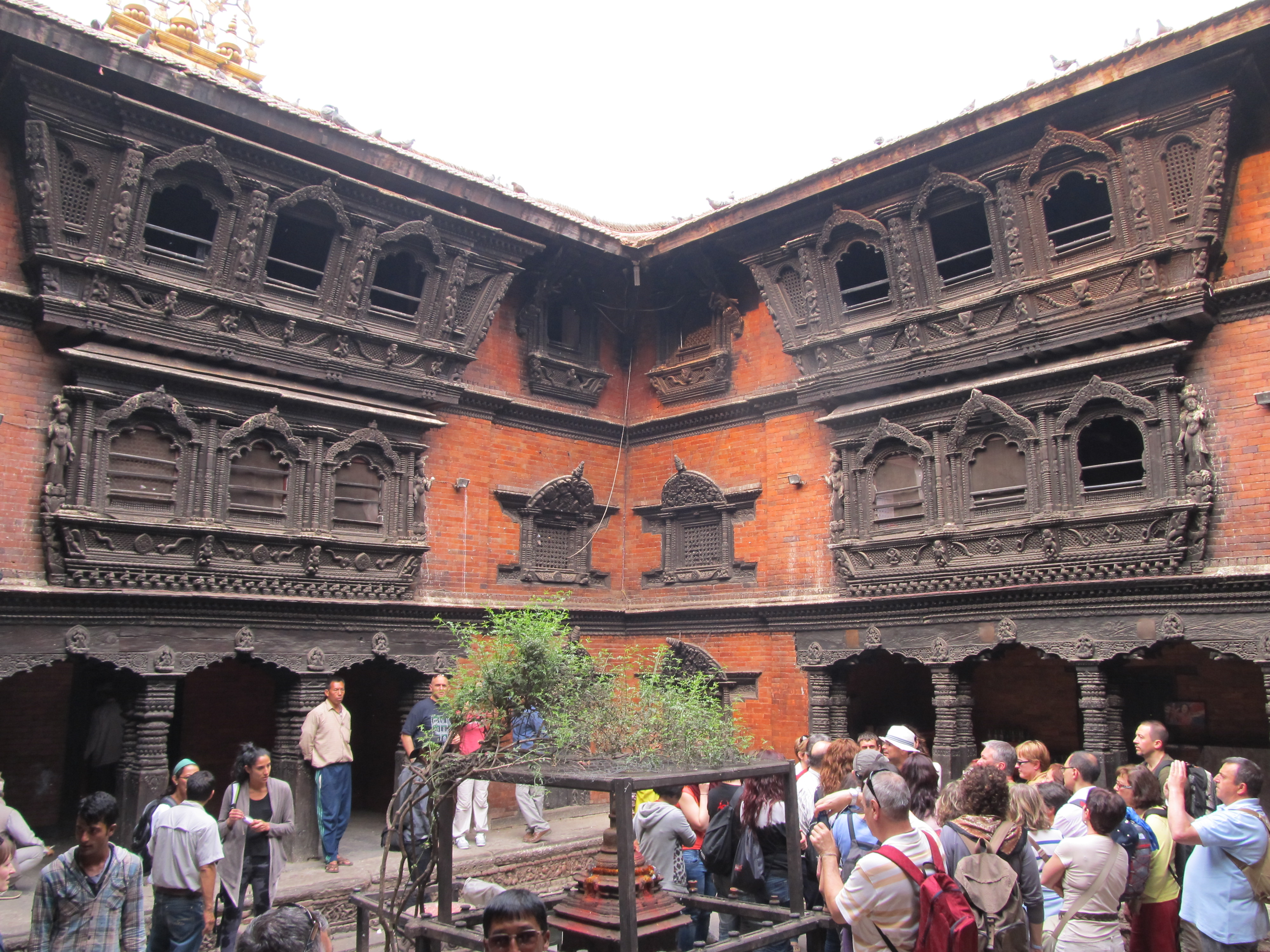
Tourism is one of Nepal's largest foreign exchange earners.

While Kathmandu is Nepal's main commercial center, most of the country's industries are located along the southern border with India. The economy of Nepal relies heavily on tourism, agriculture, food processing, metal production, remittances, carpet making, and textile manufacturing. Nepal's principal trading partners are India, the United States, and China. Binod Chaudhary is Nepal's sole Forbes-listed billionaire.

=== Economic history ===
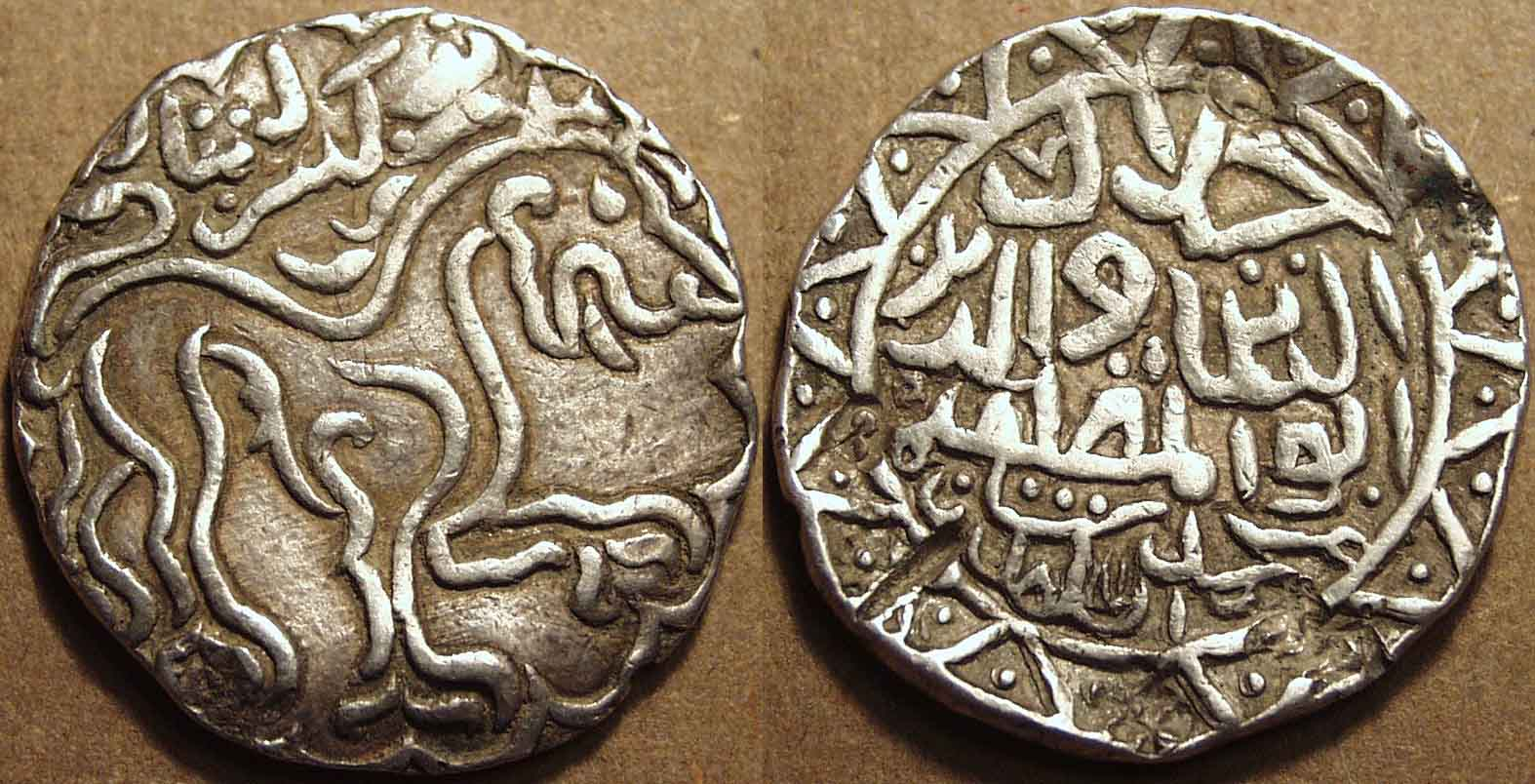
Coinage from the Bengal Sultanate

The taka introduced by Muslims is the historical currency of Bengal, Nepal, and Tibet. Arab and Persian traders frequented the region for centuries. One branch of the ancient Silk Road ran between Tibet, Sikkim, Nepal, Bhutan, and Bengal. The Lhasa Newar merchants were active on the trade route until the Chinese takeover of Tibet in the 1950s. The Kathmandu Valley's early prosperity was due to these merchants. Another branch of the Silk Road connected Bengal with China through Burma and Yunnan. This route is also known as the Tea Horse Road. The Grand Trunk Road has its eastern terminus in Bengal. The seaports of Bengal were part of Indian Ocean trade networks with Africa and East Asia. In the 15th century, the Sultan of Bengal shipped a giraffe from Somalia and sent it to China as a gift for the Ming emperor. In the 17th century, Mughal Bengal generated 50% of India's GDP due to its worldwide muslin and silk exports. The Portuguese were the first Europeans to establish trading posts in the region. By the 18th century, Bengal attracted Dutch, French, Armenian, Danish, Greek, and British traders.

== Political and legal systems ==
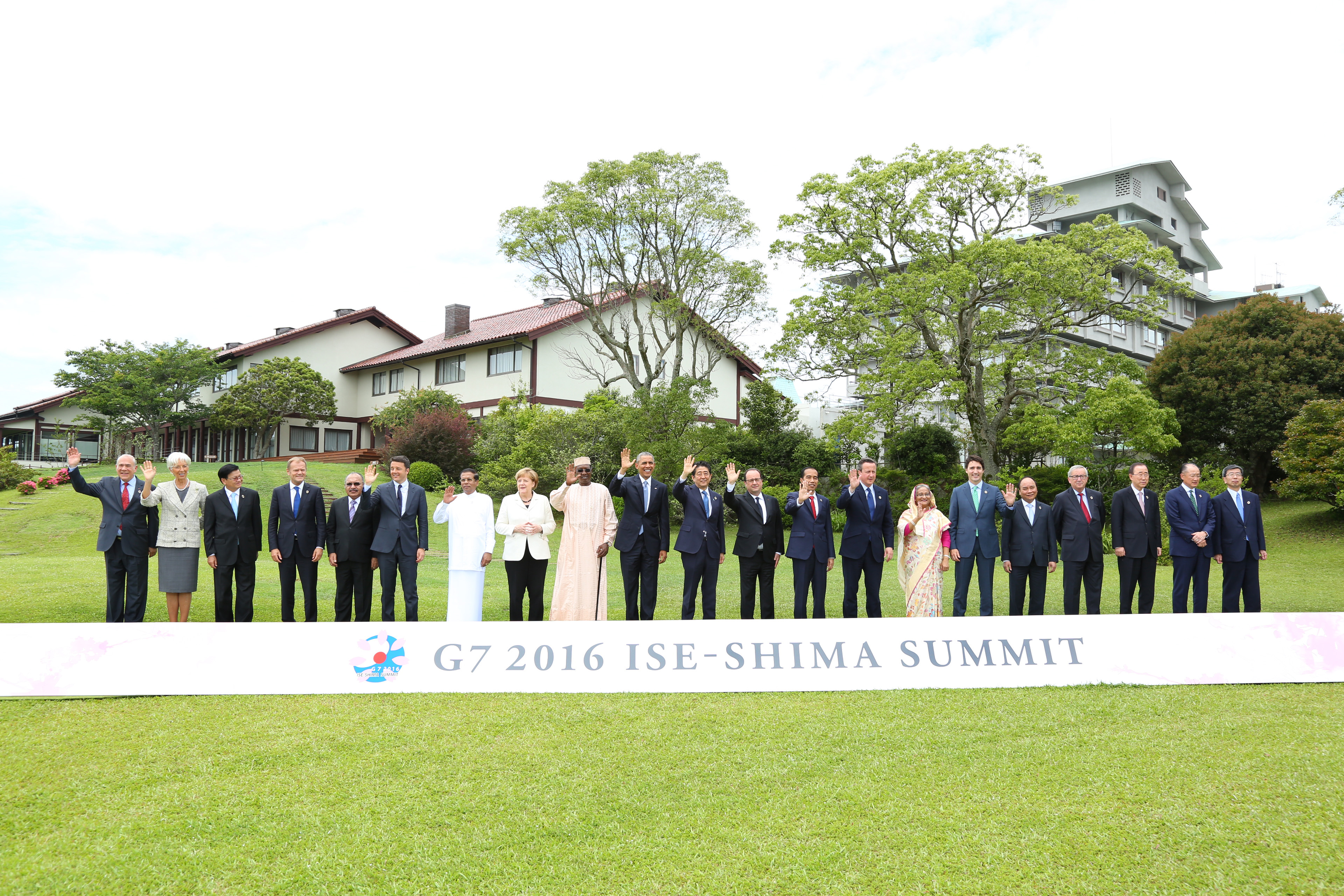
The Prime Minister of Bangladesh (seventh from right) with G7 leaders in Japan

=== Bangladesh ===
Bangladesh is a unitary state and a parliamentary republic. The Jatiyo Sangshad is its unicameral legislature. The President of Bangladesh is the ceremonial head of state, and the Prime Minister of Bangladesh is the head of government. The legal system of Bangladesh is based on English common law and Muslim, Hindu, and Christian personal religious laws. The Supreme Court of Bangladesh has wide powers for judicial review. Fundamental rights are enshrined in the country's constitution, but the human rights situation faces challenges. Bangladesh ranks first in gender equality in South Asia.

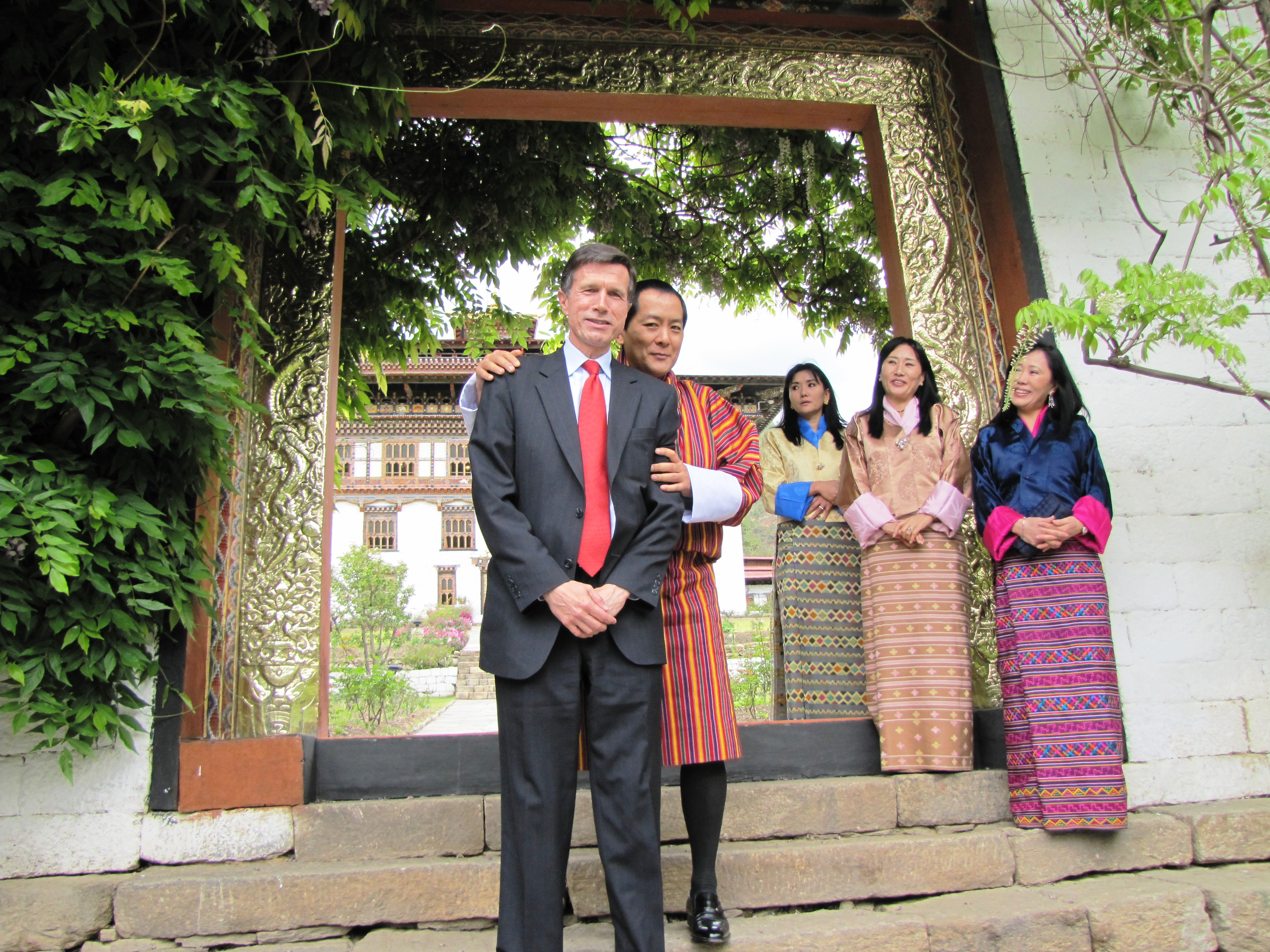
Bhutan's royal family with a US government official

=== Bhutan ===
Bhutan is a constitutional monarchy headed by the King of Bhutan. Bhutan is a parliamentary democracy, with an elected bicameral legislature. The Prime Minister of Bhutan is the head of government. The legal system of Bhutan is a mixture of the semi-theocratic Tsa Yig code and English common law influences. Capital punishment was abolished in Bhutan in 2004.

=== India ===
India is a federal parliamentary republic. While the Indian federal government is headed by the ceremonial President of India and executive Prime Minister of India, the states of India are headed by a ceremonial governor and executive chief minister. Indian legislatures include the bicameral national parliament and numerous unicameral and bicameral state legislatures. The federal government can impose President's rule in the states. Indian states are not permitted to develop relations with foreign countries, including neighbouring countries within Eastern South Asia unless it is strictly overseen by the heavily bureaucratic federal government. The Indian legal system is a mixture of English common law, civil law, custom laws, and religious laws. The Supreme Court of India has a notable history of judicial activism. Fundamental rights are enshrined in India's constitution.

Despite India's democratic framework, much of northeast India is under the Armed Forces (Special Powers) Act, which has been described as "draconian". Human rights abuses in Manipur have been a challenge.

=== Nepal ===
Nepal is a federal republic. The President of Nepal is the head of state. The Prime Minister of Nepal's role as head of government has been in place for over a century. Nepal has a bicameral parliament. The country continues to transition from a monarchy to a republic. Nepal's legal system is historically based on Hindu law but has incorporated influences from English law and other legal systems since modernisation began in the country in the 1950s. Nepal has seen secularisation since the republic was proclaimed in 2008. Capital punishment has been abolished. Nepal ranked 63rd on the 2016 Rule of Law Index compiled by the World Justice Project, which was higher than India, Bangladesh, and Pakistan.

== Armed forces ==
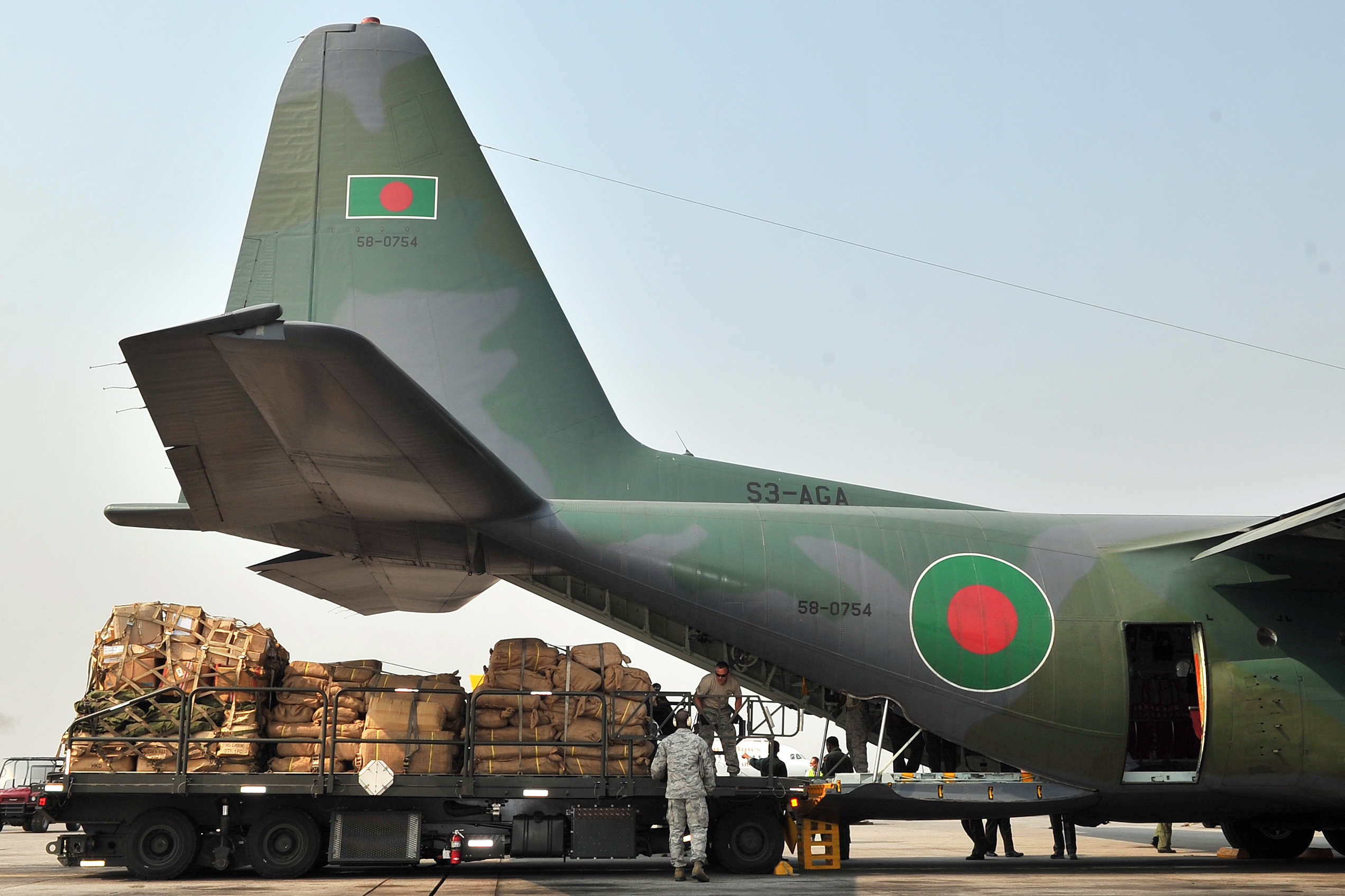
US Air Force personnel unloading relief supplies from a Bangladesh Air Force C130 plane in Kathmandu, Nepal

=== Bangladesh ===
The Bangladesh Armed Forces are the third-largest in South Asia and include the Bangladesh Army, Bangladesh Navy, and Bangladesh Air Force. Bangladesh is a leading contributor of UN peacekeeping forces. Bangladesh's main defence partners are the United States, the United Kingdom, Russia, and China. Bangladesh's military was responsible for several coups in the 1970s and 1980s.

=== Bhutan ===
The Royal Bhutan Army is Bhutan's principal defence force. It has an extensive partnership with the armed forces of neighbouring India that includes training and logistics. The Royal Bhutan Army is responsible for monitoring Bhutan's disputed northern border with China.

=== India ===
The Indian Eastern Command is responsible for the country's security interests in the Eastern South Asia region.

The Indian Armed Forces is the world's third-largest military force. It includes the Indian Army, Indian Navy, and Indian Air Force. The Indian military is the foremost regional military in South Asia. India is a declared nuclear weapons state. India's main defence suppliers include Russia, the United States, and Israel.

A British Army soldier with Nepalese Gurkha soldiers

=== Nepal ===
The Nepal Army is responsible for landlocked Nepal's national security. It includes the Nepalese Army Air Service. Nepal's military has historically enjoyed a close association with the British armed forces due to the recruitment of Gurkhas. Nepal is a consistent contributor to UN peacekeeping operations.

== Regional economic integration ==
=== BBIN Motor Vehicle Agreement ===
In 2015, the BBIN countries signed an agreement to allow their vehicles (carrying both cargo and passengers) to travel between the countries with an electronic permit. Once implemented, the agreement is expected to replace transshipment costs with cheaper direct transit. However, its implementation has been forestalled by the failure of Bhutan's upper house to ratify the agreement, even though Bangladesh, India and Nepal have ratified. Bhutanese opponents argue that allowing foreign vehicles within the country would pollute its natural environment. In 2018, it was reported that Bangladesh, India and Nepal could move forward with implementation without Bhutan.

=== Bangladesh transit ===
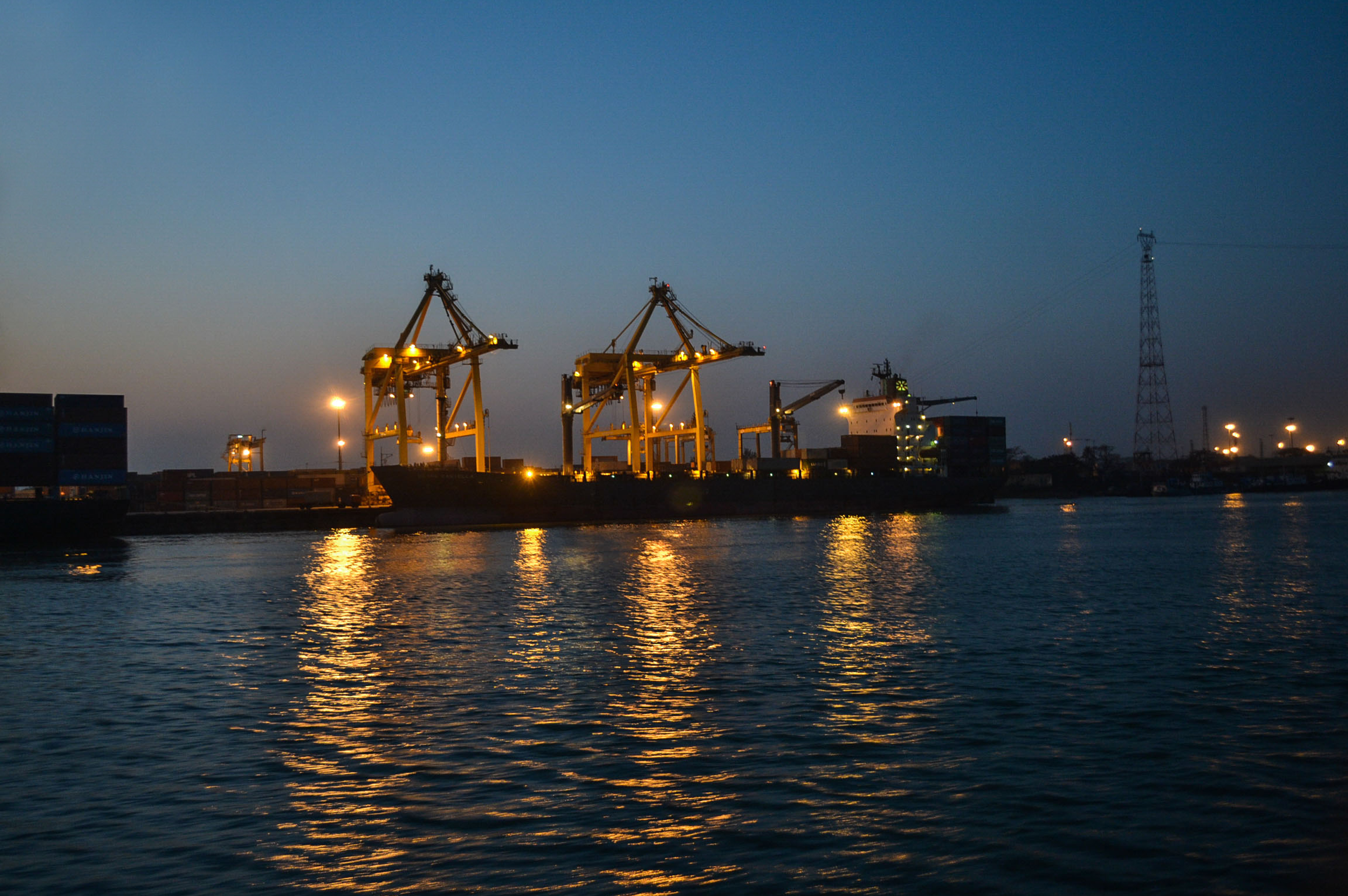
Chittagong in Bangladesh hosts the busiest seaport in the region, handling over 2.2 million TEUs in 2016

Prior to the partition of British India, a regime of freedom of trade and transport existed in the region, including free ports in Calcutta, Narayanganj and Chittagong. The Eastern Bengal Railway and Assam Bengal Railway were vital transport arteries. Cross border transport continued after partition of Bengal in 1947. In 1963, an agreement between Nepal and Pakistan allowed free trade and transit through the port of Chittagong in East Pakistan. However, cross border railway, bus and water transport became indefinitely suspended after the Indo-Pakistan War of 1965. After the independence of East Pakistan, Nepal signed a Transit Agreement with Bangladesh in 1976, even though cross border transport through India remained suspended since 1965.

In 2010, a Joint Declaration by the Prime Ministers of Bangladesh and India pledged to establish a transit regime for landlocked Northeast India, Nepal and Bhutan through Bangladeshi territory. The proposed transit is focused on international seaports in Chittagong and Mongla, as well as the Bangladesh Railway and inland waterways. In 2016, the prime ministers of Nepal and India agreed in principle on the prospect of freedom of transit. In 2017, a joint statement by the prime ministers of Bangladesh and Bhutan also affirmed the principle of freedom of transit.

In 2016, the first Indian ship made transit through Bangladesh while travelling between West Bengal and Tripura. The Port of Ashuganj was officially declared a port of call.

In 2017, the World Bank announced a US$150 million financing agreement for improving infrastructure to develop a transit regime.

The International Road Transport Union has called for a singular customs system in the region.

=== Internet connectivity ===
Northeast Indian states import internet bandwidth by using the Bangladeshi submarine cable in the Bay of Bengal. Bangladesh also plans to export internet bandwidth to Bhutan. Nepal imports internet bandwidth from both India and China.

=== Hydropower ===
Bhutan exports electricity to India from four major hydroelectric facilities. Bhutan, Nepal and India plan to export electricity to Bangladesh.

=== Visa free travel ===
India enjoys a visa free travel regime with Nepal and Bhutan. Bangladesh enjoys a visa free regime with Bhutan and its citizens get a visa on arrival in Nepal. However, visa requirements still exist between India and Bangladesh and between Nepal and Bhutan.

== Water sharing ==
There are numerous transboundary rivers in the region, which has been a cause of water sharing disputes. Bangladesh and India share 54 transboundary rivers, but they do not have a comprehensive river management treaty. There has also been criticism of India's existing water sharing and hydropower agreements with Nepal and Bhutan. Bangladesh and India are also concerned by Chinese efforts to dam the Brahmaputra River.

== See also ==
- Countries dependent on the Bay of Bengal
- Northern South Asia
