= Patent and Designs Act 1911 =

Patent and Designs Act, 1911 (ACT NO. II OF 1911).

Imperial Legislative Council Jatiyo Sangshad
- Territorial extent: Bangladesh
- Enacted by: British Indian Empire; People's Republic of Bangladesh
- Enacted: 1 March 1911
- Commenced: 1 January 1912
- Status: Repealed

The Patent and Designs Act 1911 is a now-defunct law concerning intellectual property in Bangladesh. It included several key definitions, including of ‘Copyright’, ‘Design’, ‘Patent’ and ‘Manufacture’. The Act was replaced by the Bangladesh Industrial Designs Act of 2023 and the Bangladesh Patents Act, initially enacted in 2022 and re-enacted in 2023.

== History ==
In the Indian Sub-continent, the Patents and Designs Act was enacted in 1911 mainly on the basis of the principles laid down in the Statute of Monopolies, Patents, Design and Trade Marks Act, 1883 and Patents and Designs Act, 1907. The Patents and Designs Act, 1911 was the main law in force in Bangladesh on patents and designs. Since enactment of the law, the concepts of patents and designs have undergone enormous development through decisions of courts around the world.

The Parliament of Bangladesh enacted an amendment to the law in 2003. The Act was repealed and replaced by the Bangladesh Industrial Designs Act of 2023 and the Bangladesh Patents Act, originally enacted in 2022 and re-enacted in 2023.

== Content ==
The law covered subjects of copyright, enforcement of intellectual property rights, industrial designs, intellectual property regulatory body and patents (inventions).

== Format ==
The format of the act was divided into the following parts:

- Part I: Patents (sections 3 to 42),
- Part II: Designs (sections 43 to 54),
- Part III: General (sections 55 to 81).

== See also ==
- The Penal Code, 1860 (Bangladesh)
- Sale of Goods Act, 1930 (Bangladesh)
- Contract Act, 1872 (Bangladesh)
- Laws in Bangladesh
