= Abdul Latif Mirza v. Government of Bangladesh =

Case of the Appellate Division of the Supreme Court Bangladesh

- Court: Supreme Court of Bangladesh
- Decided: 1979

Abdul Latif Mirza v. Government of Bangladesh 31 DLR (AD) 33 is a case of the Appellate Division of the Supreme Court of Bangladesh. The case concerns preventive detention. The court asserted the principles of natural justice.

== Facts ==
The appellant, Abdul Latif Mirza, was detained under the Special Powers Act, 1974 for a speech, which the government said denounced "the fundamental principles of state policy" laid out in Part II of the Constitution of Bangladesh. The detention continued for several years. The government said the appellant was detained in order to prevent any attempt to capture state power through violent means.

== Judgement ==
The Supreme Court held that the principles of natural justice are inherently universal. It further observed that according to the third paragraph of the preamble of the Constitution, the fundamental aim of the state is a society in which the "rule of law, fundamental human rights and freedom, equality and justice, political, economic and social shall be secured".

The court held that 'satisfaction' of the detaining authority, as provided in section 3 of the Special Power Act, 1974, was not sufficient. As that provision was controlled by Article 102 (2) (b) (i) of the Constitution, the court must scrutinise the materials considered by the detaining authority for its ‘satisfaction’ and must itself be satisfied that the detention was legal. The court also held that the grounds of detention must be clear, unambiguous and must not be vague so that the detenu might be able to submit an effective representation against his detention. If the grounds of detention are indefinite and vague, the detention, as a whole, becomes illegal. Lastly, the court held that an illegal detention cannot be continued by a later valid order. The court stated that the basis for detention had to be objective, as quoted in the following.

The Special Powers Act standing by itself emphasises that the opinion of the detaining authority to act is purely subjectively, but the Constitution has given a mandate to the High Court to satisfy itself, as a judicial authority, that the detention is a lawful detention

The court endorsed the concept of ‘due process’ as articulated by Justice Hamoodur Rahman. The ‘due process’ concept in the American jurisdiction requires that the governmental actions as well as the laws made by the legislature must not be arbitrary and must be reasonable and no man should be adversely dealt with without giving him opportunity of being heard. Article 32 states that “no person shall be deprived of life or personal liberty save in accordance with law.” That means, the reasonableness of law under Article 32 will be strictly scrutinized when it relates to or deals with life or personal liberty. The rootless people cannot be evicted from slums without any scheme of their rehabilitation as it is found in violation of Articles 31 and 32.

== Significance ==
The case is a leading precedent in Bangladeshi jurisprudence on natural justice and preventive detention.

== See also ==
- Aruna Sen v. Government of Bangladesh
