= Sale of goods legislation =

Stock short title used for legislation

Sale of Goods Acts (with variations) regulate the sale of goods in several legal jurisdictions including Malaysia, New Zealand, the United Kingdom and the common law provinces of Canada.

The bill for an act with this short title will have been known as a Sale of Goods Bill during its passage through the relevant legislative process.

Sale of Goods Acts may be a generic name either for legislation bearing that short title or for all legislation which relates to the sale of goods.

== Implied terms ==
=== Seller has the right to sell ===
One can only transfer the ownership of a good if they are also the owner. The third party who bought in good faith will be weaker than the claim of the original owner.

=== Description ===
Goods must correspond with their descriptions. If it is not, the seller will face strict liability. For business-to-consumer transactions this term cannot be excluded from the contract, however this term might be excluded in business-to-business transactions.

=== Satisfactory quality (US: warrant of merchantability) ===
The goods must meet the reasonable person test of satisfactory quality. This means that the goods should be what a reasonable person would expect by considering price, description and other circumstances. However, this right is lost when a defect has been mentioned by the seller in advance or where the buyer inspected the good and the defect was obvious (not hidden or come into effect at a later point).

=== Fit For purpose ===
The goods must be reasonably fit for their purpose. This indicates that the buyer has to make the seller aware of why they would like to purchase the good. If that purpose has not been made clear, the buyer cannot claim any remedies.

=== Model, sample and installation ===
Similar to the implied terms of description, the good must match the model, sample and installation unless the seller has pointed out the differences in advance. If the seller agrees to perform the installation or arranges the installation, that has to be performed correctly.

== Parties involved in the sale of goods ==
The sale of a good is usually undertaken between two main parties, such as a trader and a consumer. Business to consumer sales (B2C) arise when one party acts as a business and the other party receives the good for private use. Business to business (B2B) sales take place when both parties act as businesses and sell the good for non-consumer sale. Consumer to consumer (C2C) arise when neither party acts as a business entity. This classification may impact on the application of relevant legislation, for example in the United Kingdom, chapter 2 of the Consumer Rights Act 2015 "applies to a contract for a trader to supply goods to a consumer" instead of the Sale of Goods Act 1979.

== Rules and risks involved in the transfer of goods between two parties ==
When a good is sold from party to party and the buyer becomes the owner, this is when they assume all the risks involved with the good. Even though the buyer is fully responsible for the good until they have paid the good in full, they still have duty to assume the loss or damage of the good. If the terms of ownership of risk are not defined by the parties, then the 'default' law of Sale of Goods applies. For example, for a specific good, the ownership is identifying when the good is in the delivery stage. Additionally, for unascertained goods, the ownership is passed until the good is identified and sent to the buyer. On the other hand, when there is a business to customer sale, the business still has the duty to assume the risk of the good until it is delivered and received by the customer.

== National legislation ==
=== Australia ===
Queensland's Sale of Goods Act was first passed in 1896 and implemented on 1 January 1897. The 1896 law has been superseded by the Sales and Storage of Goods Act as of January 1, 2019.

=== Bangladesh ===
The Bangladeshi Sales of Goods Act was enacted in 1930 when Bangladesh was part of Bengal Province, British India.

=== India ===
The Indian Sale of Goods Act 1930 is a mercantile Law, which came into existence on 1 July 1930, during the British Raj. It provides for the setting up of contracts where the seller transfers or agrees to transfer the title (ownership) in the goods to the buyer for consideration. It is applicable all over India, except Jammu and Kashmir. Under the act, goods sold from owner to buyer must be sold for a certain price and at a given period of time.]

=== Malaysia ===
The Sale of Goods Act 1957 applies.

=== New Zealand ===
New Zealand's Sale of Goods Act was passed in 1908 by the Liberal Government of New Zealand. It was amended several times, including by the Sale of Goods Amendment Act 1961 and the Sale of Goods Amendment Act 2003, before finally being repealed and replaced by Part 3 of the Contract and Commercial Law Act 2017.

=== United Kingdom ===
In regard to consumer contracts, the Sale of Goods Act 1979 was replaced by the Consumer Rights Act 2015, which covers contracts entered into from 1 October 2015. The earlier legislation, which continues in respect of business-to-business transactions, was:

- The Sale of Goods Act 1893 (56 & 57 Vict. c. 71)
- The Sale of Goods Act 1979 (c. 54)
- The Sale of Goods (Amendment) Act 1994 (c. 32)
- The Sale and Supply of Goods Act 1994 (c. 35)
- The Sale of Goods (Amendment) Act 1995 (c. 28)

== Unascertained goods ==
Sale of Goods (Amendment) Act 1995 (Note: Section 3(1).)
- Act of Parliament
- Parliament of the United Kingdom
- Long title: An Act to amend the law relating to the sale of unascertained goods forming part of an identified bulk and the sale of undivided shares in goods.
- Citation: 1995 c. 28
- Territorial extent: United Kingdom (Note: Section 3(3).)

Dates
- Royal assent: 19 July 1995
- Commencement: 19 September 1995 (Note: Section 3(2).)

Other legislation
- Amends: Sale of Goods Act 1979

Status: Current legislation

Text of statute as originally enacted

Revised text of statute as amended

Text of the Sale of Goods (Amendment) Act 1995 as in force today (including any amendments) within the United Kingdom, from legislation.gov.uk.

Unascertained goods are goods for sale which are not specifically identified at the time of the contract of sale. For example, if I pay in advance for 50 litres of petrol to put into the tank of my car, at the time of the sale it would not be known which 50 litres from the seller's tanks would be the ones I would receive.

Rules relating to unascertained goods are often incorporated into sale of goods legislation, for example, section 16 of the UK's Sale of Goods Act 1979 and section 18 of the Sale of Goods Act, 1930 (Bangladesh), state that where there is a contract for the sale of unascertained goods, no property in the goods is transferred to the buyer unless and until goods are ascertained.

In the 1885 case of Inglis v Stock, a bulk consignment of sugar was shipped aboard the City of Dublin free on board (f.o.b.), and the whole consignment was lost after shipment. The seller subsequently appropriated the parts of the lost consignment to two separate contracts. Under f.o.b. commercial terms, the seller's obligation is to deliver to the ship, after which risk passes to the buyer, and therefore claims for the loss were lodged by the buyers, in this case by Inglis. A question about the insurer's obligation to pay was taken to court and resolved by the House of Lords. The legal issue was whether the respondent had, at the time of the loss, an insurable interest in the 390 tons of sugar. The House of Lords ruled that the sale was "FOB Hamburg", and therefore after shipment the sugar, even though part of an unascertained cargo, was at the risk of the respondent; he, therefore, had an insurable interest in the sugar and the underwriter was liable for the loss.

In the United Kingdom, the Sale of Goods (Amendment) Act 1995 (c. 28) amended the legal treatment of "unascertained goods forming part of an identified bulk", reflecting recommendations and a draft bill proposed by the Law Commission and the Scottish Law Commission in 1993.

== See also ==
- List of short titles
