= Hamilton v Papakura District Council =

Hamilton v Papakura District Council (New Zealand)
- Court: Judicial Committee of the Privy Council
- Full case name: Hamilton & Anor v. Papakura District Council & Watercare Services Limited
- Decided: 28 February 2002
- Citation: [2000] 1 NZLR 265, [2002] 3 NZLR 308, [2002] UKPC 9
- Transcript: Privy Council judgment

Court membership
- Judges sitting: Lord Nicholls of Birkenhead, Lord Hutton, Lord Rodger of Earlsferry, Sir Andrew Leggatt, Sir Kenneth Keith

Keywords
- negligence

Hamilton v Papakura District Council (New Zealand) [2002] UKPC 9 is a cited case in New Zealand regarding liability under tort for negligence under Rylands v Fletcher.

== Background ==
The Hamiltons grew hydroponic cherry tomatoes, using the Papakura town water supply to supply their water needs. When they found their crop had been destroyed, they claimed that the water supply company and the local council were at fault, claiming that the water was contaminated by minute traces of herbicide in the water supply.

They claimed that this was a breach of the Sale of Goods Act [1908].
