= Contract of sale =

Legal contract for the purchase of assets

In contract law, a contract of sale, sales contract, sales order, or contract for sale is a legal contract for the purchase of assets (goods or property) by a buyer (or purchaser) from a seller (or vendor) for an agreed upon value in money (or money equivalent).

An obvious ancient practice of exchange, in many common law jurisdictions it is now governed by statutory law. See commercial law.

Contracts of sale involving goods are governed by Article 2 of the Uniform Commercial Code in most jurisdictions in the United States. In Quebec, such contracts are governed by the Civil Code of Quebec as a nominate contract in the book on the law of obligations. In some Muslim countries it is governed by sharia (Islamic law); however, many Muslim countries apply other law to contacts (e.g. the Egyptian Civil Code, based on the Napoleonic Code, which beyond its application in Egypt serves as the model for the civil codes of several other Arab states).

A contract of sale lays out the terms of a transaction of goods or services, identifying the goods sold, listing delivery instructions, inspection period, any warranties and details of payment.

== Formation and stages ==
According to the Civil Code of the Philippines Article 1458, the contract of sale has three stages: negotiation, perfection, and consummation.

- Negotiation begins when prospective contracting parties indicate interest in the contract, ending with its finalization.
- Perfection begins upon the concurrence of the elements of sale. These elements include the meeting of the minds, determinate subject matter or object, and the price certain in money or its equivalent.
- Consummation happens when the parties perform their respective undertaking, resulting to the extinguishment of the contract.

In the United States, according to the Uniform Commercial Code Article 2, the contract of sale can be formed in different ways: (1) offer and acceptance, where a sale begins with an offer and acceptance; (2) firm offers, where a merchant's written offer remains open for a specified time; and (3) battle of the forms, where conflicting terms in exchanged forms are resolved by the UCC.

== Contract of sale vs. Contract to sell ==
In some jurisdictions such as the Philippines and India, there is a distinction between a contract of sale and a contract to sell.

Under the Indian Sale of Goods Act, 1930 paragraph 8.2.2, a contract of sale is an actual sale when there is a transfer of ownership at the time of entering the contract. It is an agreement to sell, however, when the transfer of ownership is to be agreed later.

In the Philippines, under Article 1458 of the Civil Code, a contract is a contract of sale when ownership is transferred upon perfection of the contract while a contract to sell, although not explicitly stated in the civil code, is when the ownership is not transferred until a suspensive condition is met.

== See also ==
- Contract for future sale

Denmark

- Danish Sale of Goods Act

Germany

- Contracts of sale are covered in the Schuldrecht section of the Bürgerliches Gesetzbuch or German Civil Code, sections 241-853.

United Kingdom

- Sale of Goods Act 1893
- Sale of Goods Act 1979
- Consumer Rights Act 2015
- Bill of sale
- Part exchange
- Tendering
- Implied condition
