= Danish Sale of Goods Act =

Trading regulation in Denmark

The Danish Sale of Goods Act (Danish: Købeloven; Consolidation Act number 237 of March 28, 2003) lays down various rules of trade between companies (commercial sale) and between companies and consumers (consumer sale).

== Main points ==
- Overdue delivery or defective goods are considered breaches of contract on the seller's part.
- Overdue payment or non-payment are considered main breaches of contract on the buyer's part.
- Seller's breach of contract may cause the customer to claim damages, rescind the contract of sale or demand goods delivered to replace the defective ones.
- The rules of commercial sale are the most restrictive ones.
- Any delay usually makes it possible for the customer to rescind the contract of sale or claim damages (if the goods have to be purchased elsewhere at a higher price).
- Defective goods of any kind must immediately be reported to the seller.
- The Sale of Goods Act's provisions on defective goods and overdue delivery can be departed from through terms of sale and delivery. However, most trades have set forth individual customs impeding full disclaimer of any provisions. Otherwise, they will never see any customers.

== See also ==
- Sale of Goods Act
