= Aruna Sen v. Government of Bangladesh =

Bangladesh Supreme Court case

- Court: High Court Division
- Decided: 1975

Aruna Sen v. Government of Bangladesh (1975) 27 DLR (HCD) 122 is a case of the High Court Division of the Supreme Court of Bangladesh. The case concerns unlawful detention under the Special Powers Act, 1974 (SPA). The judgement set a precedent for invalidating most detentions under the SPA.

== Background ==
The original 1972 Constitution of Bangladesh included no provision for preventive detention. Part III of the original constitution provided strong safeguards for civil and political rights, including the right not to be arbitrarily detained. In Article 26 (2), it provided that any law inconsistent with any provision in Part III would, "to the extent of such inconsistency, become void". Article 32 added that "no person shall be deprived of personal liberty save in accordance with law." Article 33 of Part III introduced three safeguards for the rights of detainees: they must be informed of the grounds of their arrest "as soon as may be", they must have a "right to consult and be defended by a legal practitioner" and they must be produced before a magistrate within 24 hours of the arrest.

The spirit of 1972 did not last long. In September 1973, only nine months after the constitution was created, parliament passed Act XXIV, also known as the Second Amendment Bill. Now, Article 26 no longer provided an absolute safeguard of "fundamental rights" but allowed them to be circumvented by amendments. Furthermore, the addition of Article 33(3) allowed preventive detention and exempted it from constitutional safeguards for arrest and detention.

Parliament was quick to make use of its newly granted authority. Five months later, on 9 February 1974, it enacted the Special Powers Act, 1974 (SPA). The act was purportedly designed to crush black marketers and smugglers, said to be responsible for the food shortages throughout the country. As political dissent by left-wing guerrillas intensified, Prime Minister Sheikh Mujibur Rahman cracked down through a series of measures: a printing and press ordinance, a three-month ban on strikes, a ban on public gatherings, the declaration of a state of emergency under which civil rights were suspended and finally the establishment of one-party rule in 1975. The Special Powers Act (SPA) proved to be a useful instrument in that process.

== Facts ==
The detention of Chanchal Sen, who had been taken away by the Rakki Bahini, was challenged by a writ petition, under Article 102 (2) (b) (i) of the Constitution by his mother, Aruna Sen. Writ petitions are an indirect system of judicial review in Bangladesh. After much effort, she learned that her son had been handed over to the Special Branch of the Police Department and was in custody at Mohammadpur Police Station within Dhaka City.

She visited her son and found him in a miserable condition. Signs of physical torture were visible on his whole body. The case of the government was that the detainee had been held under section 3 of the Special Powers Act, 1974, for various activities such as illegal possession of arms, robberies and murders.

== Judgement ==
The court observed the following:

The English principle as expressed by Lord Atkin in his dissenting speech in Liversidge v Anderson, that every imprisonment without trial and conviction is prima facie unlawful and the onus in upon the detaining authority to justify the detention by establishing the legality of its action according to the principles of English law has been adopted in the legal system of this Subcontinent, as has been rightly observed by Hamoodur Rahman, J., (as he then was) in the Government of West Pakistan and another vs. Begum Agha Abdul Karim Sohorish Kashmiri.

It is further observed in Aruna Sen's case that an order of detention of malafide or collated purpose is illegal, it must be shown that the grounds of detention are relevant and do not suffer from vagueness, are not indefinite and are not such as to deprive the detained person of his constitutional and legal right of making an effective representation against his detention at the earliest opportunity as provided in clause (5) of Article 33 of the Constitution and subsection (1) of section 8 of the Special Powers Act, 1974. It is also held in that case that if some of the grounds are irrelevant or non-existent, the satisfaction of the detaining authority, in that particular case, may be said to have been caused by both valid and invalid grounds and such satisfaction cannot be held to be sufficient compliance with the requirement of law. Similarly, on question relating to furnishing of grounds of detention to the detenu as required by clause (5) of Article 33 of the Constitution and sub-section (1) of section 8 of the Special Powers Act, 1974, it is held that if some of the grounds are vague and indefinite although some other grounds are not so, the constitutional and legal requirements of the above provisions cannot be said to have been complied with.

== Significance ==
The case set a precedent against unlawful and preventive detention. Most of the detentions under the Special Powers Act were found invalid because of procedural irregularities or because the evidence was insufficient to warrant the assumption that a detainee was likely to commit a "prejudicial act". In one case, the court went so far as to assert that hardly any real case occurred when the provision containing a "threat to the security of the state" was found to have been properly applied.

The case showed that the High Court Division had wider powers for judicial review than its regional counterparts in the rest of Asia.

Despite the landmark High Court Division judgement, arbitrary detentions have continued in Bangladesh.

== See also ==
- Law of Bangladesh
