= Aleya Begum v. Lance Nayek Abul Kalam Azad =

- Court: Senior Judicial Magistrate Court, Court No.3, Rangamati, Bangladesh
- Decided: 14 January 2015

Court membership
- Judges sitting: Irin Parveen, Senior Judicial Magistrate, Rangamati

Aleya Begum v. Lance Nayek Abul Kalam Azad (2015) CR No. 07/2014 is a case of the Senior Judicial Magistrate Court, Rangamati Hill Tracts District, Bangladesh. This is the first leading case judgement made under the Maintenance of the Parents Act, 2013. The judgement was pronounced by Irin Parveen, Senior Judicial Magistrate, Rangamati.

== Facts ==
Mrs. Aleya Begum was a widow who has three sons. The eldest son Abul Kalam Azad was Lance Nayek at Border Guards Bangladesh (BGB). Her other two sons were financially very poor compared to the eldest son. The second son was a driver, and the third son was a worker in a garments factory. One day, she, along with her second son, went to the house of her eldest son Azad. When Aleya asked for regular maintenance, at least for her medical expenses that were essential at her old age, both Azad and his wife misbehaved with her and said that they would not be able to pay anything to her. She added that the wife of the eldest son provoked his eldest son in this matter.

Moreover, they did not maintain any contact with her. Later Aleya, being aggrieved, filed the case against her eldest son and son's wife. In the case, she accused the son and his wife of not paying any maintenance for 16 to 17 years. She mentioned that she brought up her son, taking many sufferings, including financial hardships. She expected that he would pay her maintenance after getting the job in the Border Guards Bangladesh (BGB). However, Azad never paid it to her.

== Legislation ==
In the past, maintenance for parents' issues was dealt with under The Family Courts Ordinance, 1985. However, that law was not observed in practice. The government of Bangladesh enacted the Maintenance of the Parents Act, 2013, the first law of its kind in Bangladesh. A law designed to ensure social security for the elderly obliges offspring to take good care of their parents. There was no specific legal framework to bring any legal action against the offspring to ensure the parents' maintenance before this act.

Since there is a positive side to this act after its adoption, several cases are listed in it. The first case Liakot Ali v. Yeasin Rana (2013), under this act, was filed in November 2013 by a father in 1st Class Judicial Magistrate Court, Chandpur, for not providing him due maintenance. Since then, a number of cases have been filed. Under this Act of 2013, the offenses for providing no maintenance are cognizable, bailable, and compoundable.

== Judgement ==
After thoroughly reviewing the facts and hearing from witnesses, the court found the complaint brought against offenders under sections 5(1) and 5(2)(a) of Maintenance of the Parents Act, 2013 was proved and gave judgement in favor of Aleya. Since charges against them were substantiated beyond any reasonable doubt, the court set a judgement to punish the offenders, the son and son's wife of the complaint. The court ordered the complainant's son in the lawsuit to be fined, Taka. 80,000 / - and the son's wife, a fine of Taka. 70,000 / -. Instead, for non-payment, they will be sentenced to three and two months in prison, respectively. The court further said that out of the total amount of the said fine of Taka. 20,000 / - (10,000 from son and 10,000 from daughter-in-law) would have to be paid in the government fund, and the remaining amount would have to be handed over to the parents of the offenders. The court ruled on 14 January 2015.

== Significance ==
This is the first major case under the Maintenance of the Parents Act, 2013, which has been a significant decision in terms of parental support in Bangladesh.

== See also ==
- Law of Bangladesh
