= Law of Bangladesh =

Bangladesh is a common law country, with its legal system inherited from the British during their colonial rule over British India. The region now known as Bangladesh was referred to as Bengal during both the British and Mughal periods, and by other names in earlier times. While religious and political institutions existed from ancient times, the Mughals were the first to recognise and formalize them through state mechanisms. The Charter of 1726, granted by King George I, authorised the East India Company to establish Mayor's Courts in Madras, Bombay and Calcutta and is recognised as the first codified law for the British India. As a part of the then British India, it was the first codified law for the then Bengal too. Since independence in 1971, statutory law enacted by the Parliament of Bangladesh has been the primary form of legislation. Judge-made law continues to be significant in areas such as constitutional law. Unlike in other common law countries, the Supreme Court of Bangladesh has the power to not only interpret laws made by the parliament, but to also declare them null and void and to enforce fundamental rights of the citizens. The Bangladesh Code includes a compilation of all laws since 1836. The vast majority of Bangladeshi laws are in English. But most laws adopted after 1987 are in Bengali. Family law is intertwined with religious law. Bangladesh has significant international law obligations.

During periods of martial law in the 1970s and 1980s, proclamations and ordinances were issued as laws. In 2010, the Supreme Court declared that martial law was illegal, which led to a re-enactment of some laws by parliament. A Right to Information Act has been enacted. Several of Bangladesh's laws are controversial, archaic or in violation of the country's own constitution. They include the country's prostitution law, special powers act, blasphemy law, sedition law, internet regulation law, NGO law, media regulation law, military justice and aspects of its property law. Many colonial laws require modernization.

There are no jury trials in Bangladesh. All criminal and civil cases are decided in bench trials.

According to the World Justice Project, Bangladesh ranked 103rd out of 113 countries in an index of the rule of law in 2016.

== Fundamental rights in Bangladesh ==
Part III of the Constitution of Bangladesh includes the articles of fundamental rights.

1. Laws inconsistent with fundamental rights to be void (Article-26)
2. Equality before law (Article-27)
3. Discrimination on grounds of religion, etc. (Article-28)
4. Equality of opportunity in public employment (Article-29)
5. Prohibition of foreign titles, etc. (Article-30)
6. Right to protection of law (Article-31)
7. Protection of right to life and personal liberty (Article-32)
8. Safeguards as to arrest and detention (Article-33)
9. Prohibition of forced labour (Article-34)
10. Protection in respect of trial and punishment (Article-35)
11. Freedom of movement (Article-36)
12. Freedom of assembly (Article-37)
13. Freedom of association (Article-38)
14. Freedom of thought and conscience, and of speech (Article-39)
15. Freedom of profession or occupation (Article-40)
16. Freedom of religion (Article-41)
17. Rights of property (Article-42)
18. Protection of home and correspondence (Article-43)
19. Enforcement of fundamental rights (Article-44)
20. Modification of rights in respect of disciplinary law (Article-45)
21. Power to provide indemnity (Article-46)
22. Saving for certain laws (Article-47)
23. Inapplicability of certain articles (Article-47A)

== Case law ==
Judicial precedent is enshrined under Article 111 of the Constitution of Bangladesh.

The Supreme Court of Bangladesh has provided vital judicial precedents in areas like constitutional law, such as in Bangladesh Italian Marble Works Ltd. v. Government of Bangladesh, which declared martial law illegal. The judgement of Secretary, Ministry of Finance v Masdar Hossain asserted the separation of powers and judicial independence.

In Aruna Sen v. Government of Bangladesh, the Supreme Court set a precedent against unlawful detention and torture. The court affirmed the principle of natural justice in the judgement of Abdul Latif Mirza v. Government of Bangladesh. The two verdicts were precedents for invalidating most detentions under the Special Powers Act, 1974.

The doctrine of legitimate expectation in Bangladeshi law has developed through judicial precedent.

== Codification and language ==
The Bangladesh Code has been published since 1977. Most of its laws, dating between 1836 and 1987, are in English. Following a government circular in 1987, the code has been published primarily in Bengali. The language of both the Appellate Division and the High Court Division of the Supreme Court is English. However, most magistrates courts and district courts use Bengali. The lack of a uniform language has been a cause of concern, with arguments in favor of both English and Bengali. The country's financial sector depends on English, whereas cultural nationalists prefer Bengali.

== Freedom of information ==
The Right to Information Act of 2009, passed by the Jatiya Sangsad, was hailed as a major reform. The law allows information requests to most government departments, except the military. Hence, security agreements with foreign countries are not under its purview.

As of 2016, 76,043 requests have been made to the Chief Information Commissioner by citizens and organizations.

== Criminal law ==
The main criminal laws are the Penal Code, 1860, the Code of Criminal Procedure of Bangladesh, the Cattle Trespass Act 1871, the Explosive Substances Act 1908, the Prevention of Corruption Act 1947, the Anti-Corruption Act 1957, the Special Powers Act 1974, the Dowry Prohibition Act 1980, the Narcotics (Control) Act 1990, the Women and Children Oppression Act 1995 and the Anti-Terrorism Act 2013.

== Company law ==
Bangladesh's company law has its roots in the Joint Stock Companies Act 1844 enacted by the Parliament of the United Kingdom. It was later influenced by the Companies Act 1857, Companies Act 1913 and Companies Act 1929. The Securities and Exchange Ordinance, 1969 was the most important piece of legislation incorporating corporate activities during the Pakistan period. After the independence of Bangladesh, post partition Indian company law served as a model for reforms. The Company Law Reforms Committee was set up in 1979 with leading civil servants, chartered accountants and lawyers. The committee's recommendations were not implemented until 1994, when the Companies Act (Bangladesh) 1994 was passed by the Jatiyo Sangshad. The Securities and Exchange Commission Act of 1993 created the Bangladesh Securities and Exchange Commission to oversee the country's two stock markets.

== Contract law ==
Contract law in Bangladesh is primarily governed by the Contract Act 1872 and the Sale of Goods Act 1930.

According to the World Bank's 2016 ease of doing business index, Bangladesh ranks 189th in enforcing contracts.

== Religious law ==
Islamic Shari'a law applies to Bangladeshi Muslims in personal, family and inheritance matters, while Hindu personal law governs these areas for Bangladeshi Hindus. Bangladeshi Buddhists also follow Hindu personal law. The Christian Marriage Act, 1872 applies to Bangladeshi Christians.

== Tax law ==
The Customs Act 1969 served as the foundation of customs law until 2023, when it was replaced by the Customs Act, 2023. The Income Tax Ordinance were promulgated in 1984. In 2023, it has been replaced by the Income Tax Act of 2023. Value Added Tax was revised with the Value Added Tax (VAT) and Supplementary Duty (SD) Act 2012.

The Municipal Taxation Act 1881 governs municipal taxes.

== Labour law ==
The Bangladesh Labour Act 2006 was amended with the Bangladesh Labour (Amendment) Bill, 2013 to improve worker rights, including greater but limited freedom to form trade unions, and improving occupational health and safety condition in factories. In 2017, the government pledged to remove the ban on trade unions in export processing zones.

== Property law ==
The Constitution guarantees the right to private property. The Transfer of Property Act, 1882 is the principal legislation concerning property transactions. However, some government agencies like RAJUK restrict property transfers in urban areas through foreign direct investment. The Vested Property Act allows the government to confiscate property from entities or individuals deemed as enemies of the state.

== Intellectual property law ==
The Patent and Designs Act 1911 was the country's oldest legislation concerning patents and designs. It has now been repealed and replaced by two separate laws: the Bangladesh Industrial Designs Act of 2023 and the Patents Act of 2023. The Copyright Act 2023 and the Trademarks Act 2009 are the other main laws.

== Judiciary ==
The general judicial hierarchy in Bangladesh includes both civil and criminal courts in districts, with the Supreme Court of Bangladesh at the top.

== Judicial review ==
In Bangladesh, Judicial review is carried out through writ petitions filed with the High Court Division under Article 102 of the Constitution.

== Alternative dispute resolution ==
The Bangladesh International Arbitration Center is dispute resolution organisation for commercial arbitration in the country. It is the country's first center for alternative dispute resolution.

== Legal profession ==
In Bangladesh, a lawyer is called an advocate after enrolling with the Bar. Law students also have the option to pursue legal education abroad–such as training to become barristers in the United Kingdom or other countries–and may return to Bangladesh to enroll as advocates with the Bangladesh Bar Council. Membership in the Bangladesh Bar Council is mandatory for anyone wishing to become an advocate, and requires passing a prescribed enrollment examination. Before qualifying as an advocate, a law graduate must complete a minimum of six months of apprenticeship under a senior lawyer at a Bar Association.

After becoming an advocate, one must practice for a minimum of two years at a Bar Association before becoming eligible to join the Bangladesh Supreme Court Bar Association, which requires passing the prescribed High Court Permission Examination.

The Bangladesh Bar Council and the Bangladesh Supreme Court Bar Association are the two principal leading bodies representing lawyers in the country. The Dhaka Bar Association is the largest Bar Association in Asia in terms of membership.

== See also ==
- Human rights in Bangladesh
- List of acts of the Jatiya Sangsad
- List of ordinances issued in Bangladesh
- Executive Magistrate of Bangladesh
