= Special Powers Act =

The Special Powers Act may refer to:

- The Civil Authorities (Special Powers) Act (Northern Ireland) 1922
- The Armed Forces (Special Powers) Act of India
- Special Powers Act, 1974 of Bangladesh

== See also ==
- War Powers Act, also called War Powers Resolution of 1973 of United States
