= Bangladesh International Arbitration Center =

Alternative dispute resolution body

The Bangladesh International Arbitration Center (BIAC) is an alternative dispute resolution body in Dhaka, Bangladesh.

== History ==
BIAC was founded in 2011 by a consortium of commercial chambers, including the International Chamber of Commerce, the Dhaka Chamber of Commerce and Industry and the Metropolitan Chamber of Commerce and Industry, with support from the International Finance Corporation of the World Bank Group. It is the first arbitration court in Bangladesh.

== See also ==
- Law of Bangladesh
- International Court of Arbitration
- London Court of International Arbitration
