= Contract for future sale =

A contract for future sale is a sales contract under which a farmer agrees to deliver products of specified quality and quantity to a buyer for a specified price within a prescribed time frame. Contract sales are a growing practice, recently accounting for 86% of poultry, over 80% of tobacco, more than 50% of fruits, and 43% of milk. The benefits to processors are greater uniformity and predictability resulting in lower costs of grading, processing, and packing. The benefits to farmers are more stable income from a guaranteed market and price, and possibly access to a wider range of production inputs and advanced technology. Critics are concerned about lack of accessible price information, and manipulation of markets to the disadvantage of producers.
