= Bangladesh Code =

- Language: English (Volumes 1-24); Bengali (Volumes 25-47)
- Publisher: Ministry of Law, Justice and Parliamentary Affairs
- Publication place: Bangladesh

The Bangladesh Code is an official compilation and codification of laws in Bangladesh, which is published by the Ministry of Law, Justice and Parliamentary Affairs of the Government of Bangladesh. The code was initiated in 1973 and first published in 1977.

It has 47 volumes, of which 24 are in English and 23 are in Bengali. The code includes laws enacted in British India, Pakistan (1947–1971) and the People's Republic of Bangladesh. It begins with the Districts Act, 1836.

== See also ==
- United States Code
