= Penal Code of Bangladesh =

Penal code of the People's Republic of Bangladesh

The Penal Code, 1860
- Citation: Act No. XLV of 1860
- Territorial extent: Bangladesh
- Committee report: First Law Commission
- Status: Amended

The Penal Code of Bangladesh, formally titled the Penal Code, 1860, is the general criminal law of the country. It is based on the Indian Penal Code, which was enacted in 1860 by the Governor General-in-Council. The Code bears strong similarities to the penal laws of countries that were formerly part of the British Empire in South and Southeast Asia, including Singapore, India, Pakistan, Sri Lanka and Malaysia.

The Parliament of Bangladesh has amended the Penal Code on several occasions, the most recent amendment occurring in 2004.

The Code is a legacy of the Victorian era. While its objective is to provide a general penal framework for Bangladesh, the Parliament has also enacted various penal statutes to address specific areas of criminal law.

== History ==
The Code was drafted on the recommendations of the First Law Commission of British India and presented to the Governor of Bengal in 1837. Although primarily based on Victorian English law, it also incorporated elements from the Napoleonic Code and the Louisiana Civil Code of 1825. The Code was adopted on 6 October 1860. After the partition of British India, when East Bengal became part of Pakistan, it came to be known as the Pakistan Penal Code. Following Bangladesh's independence in 1971, the Code was re-enacted as the Penal Code, 1860.

== Chapters ==
The following includes the chapters of the Code:

- Chapter I - Introduction
- Chapter II - General Explanations
- Chapter III - Punishments
- Chapter IV - General Exceptions
- Chapter V - Abetment
- Chapter VA - Criminal Conspiracy
- Chapter VI - Offences Against the State
- Chapter VII - Offences relating to the Army, Navy or Air Force
- Chapter VIII - Offences Against Public Tranquility
- Chapter IX - Offences by or relating to Public Servants
- Chapter IXA - Offences relating to Elections
- Chapter X - Contempts of the Lawful Authority of Public Servants
- Chapter XI - False Evidence and Offences Against Public Justice
- Chapter XII - Offences relating to Coin and Government Stamps
- Chapter XIII - Offences relating to Weights and Measures
- Chapter XIV - Offences Affecting the Public Health, Safety, Convenience, Decency and Morals
- Chapter XV - Offences relating to Religion
- Chapter XVI - Offences affecting the Human Body
- Chapter XVII - Offences against Property
- Chapter XVIII - Offences relating to Documents and Trade or Property Marks
- Chapter XIX - Criminal Breach of Contracts of Service
- Chapter XX - Offences relating to Marriage
- Chapter XXI - Defamation
- Chapter XXII - Criminal Intimidation, Insult, Prejudicial Act and Annoyance
- Chapter XXIII - Attempts to Commit Offences

== Controversial issues ==
=== Section 124A ===
Sedition and seditious libel have been criticized as an outdated law. While the United Kingdom has phased out penalties for seditious libel, its retention in the Bangladeshi Penal Code has been used by the government to target leading journalists and politicians.

=== Section 309 ===
Section 309 criminalizes suicide, which hinders prevention, seeking support and counsel, as well as proper reporting.

=== Capital punishment ===
Capital punishment remains legal in Bangladesh, although other common law countries like the United Kingdom and Canada have abolished the death penalty.

== See also ==
- Law of Bangladesh
