= Sale of Goods Act, 1930 =

Mercantile law

Imperial Legislative Council
- Long title: An Act to provision for the setting up of contracts is transfer of ownership between buyers and sellers.
- Territorial extent: India
- Enacted by: Imperial Legislative Council
- Enacted: 1 July 1930
- Committee report: First Law Commission

Amended by
- 23 September 1963

Related legislation
- Sale of Goods Act, 1930 (Bangladesh); Sale of Goods Act 1893
- Status: Amended

The Indian Sale of Goods Act, 1930 is a mercantile law which came into existence on 1 July 1930, during the British Raj, borrowing heavily from the United Kingdom's Sale of Goods Act 1893. It provides for the setting up of contracts where the seller transfers or agrees to transfer the title (ownership) in the goods to the buyer for consideration. It is applicable all over India. Under the act, goods sold from owner to buyer must be sold for a certain price and at a given period of time. The act was amended on 23 September 1963, and was renamed to the Sale of Goods Act, 1930. It is still in force in India, after being amended in 1963, and in Bangladesh, as the Sale of Goods Act, 1930.

== Definition ==
The definitions as per Section II (s.2 Of Sale of Goods Act 1930) of the Act are as follows:

=== Contract ===
A Contract of Sale is:

- an offer to buy for a price, or
- An offer to sell good for a price, and
- the acceptance of such offer.

A Contract may provide for:

- the immediate delivery of the goods, or
- immediate payment of the price, or
- the immediate delivery of the goods and payment both, or
- for the delivery or payment by installments, or
- that the delivery or payment or both shall be postponed.
- per the Section 5 sub-clause (2) - Subject to the provisions of any law for the time being in force, a contract of sale may be made-
- in writing or
- by word of mouth, or
- partly in writing and partly by word of mouth or
- may be implied from the conduct of the parties.

Goods are every kind of moveable property other than actionable claims and money, and include:

- Stock and shares,
- Growing crops,
- Grass, and
- Things attached to or forming part of land which is agreed to be severed before sale or under the contract of sale.

Future goods are goods that are to be:

- manufactured, or
- produced, or
- acquired, by the seller after making of the contract of sale

According to the act, the goods which form the subject of a contract of sale may be either existing goods, owned or possessed by the seller, or future goods and there may be a contract for the sale of goods the acquisition of which by the seller depends upon a contingency which may or may not happen. Where by a contract of sale the seller purports to effect a present sale of future goods, the contract operates as an agreement to sell the goods.

=== Damage ===
Goods are said to be damaged/perished if:

- The goods, at the time when the contract was made, have perished or become so damaged as no longer to answer to their description in the contract, and
- Neither seller nor buyer have the knowledge about such destroyed/damaged.

As per Section 8 of Sale of Goods Act, where there is an agreement to sell specific goods, and subsequently the goods without any fault on the part of the seller or buyer perish or become so damaged as no longer to answer to their description in the agreement before the risk passes to the buyer, the agreement is thereby avoided.

=== Violation ===
A "Fault" is defined as a wrongful act by default.

A person is said to be "insolvent" when:

- who has ceased to pay his debts in the ordinary course of business, or
- cannot pay his debts as they become due, whether he has committed an act of insolvency or not.

=== Other Definitions ===
- "price" means the money consideration for a sale of goods.
- "property" means the general property in goods, and not merely a special property.
- "quality of goods" includes their state or condition.
- "seller" means a person who sells or agrees to sell goods.
- "specific goods" means goods identified and agreed upon at the time a contract of sale is made.
- expressions used but not defined in this Act and defined in the Indian Contract Act, 1872, have the meaning assigned to them in that act.

== Requirements and Agreements ==
Section 4 of Sale of Goods Act define the term "Sale" and "agreement to sell" as follows:

- A contract of sale of goods is a contract whereby the seller transfers or agrees to transfer the property in goods to the buyer for a price. There may be a contract of sale between one part-owner and another.
- A contract of sale may be absolute or conditional.
- Where under a contract of sale the property in the goods is transferred from the seller to the buyer, the contract is called a sale, but where the transfer of the property in the goods is to take place at a future time or subject to some condition thereafter to be fulfilled, the contract is called an agreement to sell.
- An agreement to sell becomes a sale when the time elapses or the conditions are fulfilled subject to which the property in the goods is to be transferred.

The following must be fulfilled:

- There must be a contract,
- In Such contract the seller transfers or agrees to transfer the property in goods to the buyer,
- Such transfer is made for price,
- Sale may be made between one part-owner and another,
- A contract of sale may be absolute or conditional.
- At the time of agreement if the goods is in existence, it is contract of sale otherwise in respect to future goods, it is agreement to sale.
