= Contract Act, 1872 (Bangladesh) =

Bangladesh law

Contract Act, 1872 (ACT NO. IX OF 1872).

Council of the Governor General Jatiyo Sangshad
- Territorial extent: Bangladesh
- Enacted by: British Indian Empire; People's Republic of Bangladesh
- Enacted: 25 April 1872
- Commenced: 1 September 1872

Summary
- Main source of law regulating contracts in Bangladesh
- Status: Amended

The Contract Act, 1872 is the principal contract law in Bangladesh. Based on English contract law and the British Indian contract law, it was enacted in the 19th century and re-enacted by the Parliament of Bangladesh after the country's independence. It includes chapters on offer and acceptance, voidable contracts, contingent contracts, performance, breach of contract, contractual relations, the sale of goods, bailment, agency and partnership. It also covers topics such as consideration, misrepresentation and indemnity.

== See also ==
- Sale of Goods Act, 1930 (Bangladesh)
- Joint Stock Companies Act 1844
