= Sale of Goods Act 1979 =

Act of the Parliament of the United Kingdom

Sale of Goods Act 1979 (Note: Section 64(1).)
- Act of Parliament
- Parliament of the United Kingdom
- Long title: An Act to consolidate the law relating to the sale of goods.
- Citation: 1979 c. 54
- Territorial extent: United Kingdom

Dates
- Royal assent: 6 December 1979
- Commencement: 1 January 1980 (Note: Section 64(2).)

Other legislation
- Amends: Law Reform (Frustrated Contracts) Act 1943; See § Repealed enactments
- Repeals/revokes: See § Repealed enactments
- Amended by: Statute Law (Repeals) Act 1981; Insolvency Act 1985; Bankruptcy (Scotland) Act 1985; Debtors (Scotland) Act 1987; Age of Legal Capacity (Scotland) Act 1991; Sale of Goods (Amendment) Act 1994; Sale and Supply of Goods Act 1994; Sale of Goods (Amendment) Act 1995; Sale and Supply of Goods to Consumers Regulations 2002; Mental Capacity Act 2005; Bankruptcy and Diligence etc. (Scotland) Act 2007; Consumer Rights Act 2015

Status: Amended

Text of statute as originally enacted

Revised text of statute as amended

Text of the Sale of Goods Act 1979 as in force today (including any amendments) within the United Kingdom, from legislation.gov.uk.

The Sale of Goods Act 1979 (c. 4) is an act of the Parliament of the United Kingdom which regulates English contract law and UK commercial law in respect of goods that are sold and bought. The Act consolidated the original Sale of Goods Act 1893 and subsequent legislation, which in turn had codified and consolidated the law. Since 1979, there have been numerous minor statutory amendments and additions to the 1979 act. It was replaced for some aspects of consumer contracts from 1 October 2015 by the Consumer Rights Act 2015 (c 22) but remains the primary legislation underpinning business-to-business transactions involving selling or buying goods.

The act applies to contracts where property in 'goods' is transferred or agreed to be transferred for a monetary consideration, in other words: where property (ownerstop) in personal chattels is sold.

== Provisions ==
=== Part I ===
Part I (section 1) states that the act applies to contracts of sale of goods made on or after 1 January 1894. This was the date when the Sale of Goods Act 1893 took effect.

=== Part II, contract formation ===
Sections 2 to 15B concern how a contract of sale is formed and, in particular, contain standardised implied terms in all contracts of sale.

Section 2 specifies that a contract of sale involves the transfer, or an agreement to transfer, the property in goods from the seller to the buyer, in exchange for a money consideration, called the price.

Section 3(2) provides that if goods are sold and delivered to minors, or those mentally incapacitated, the minor will be liable to pay a reasonable price if the goods are necessaries. Necessaries are goods suitable to the persons' condition of life and actual requirements at the time of contracting. Under sections 6 and 7, concerning specific goods that perish, a contract is void where they perish before and avoided where they perish after contract formation. (See Mistake (contract law)). Under section 8(2) the price is a money consideration given in exchange for property in goods. If the price, or means to ascertain a price, is not agreed, the buyer will be required to pay a reasonable price.

Breach of these terms by the seller may give rise to an action for damages, and in the case of those terms which are also conditions, termination of the contract. Where the slightness of the breach renders it unreasonable for a non-consumer buyer to reject the goods, for breach of the implied terms as to description, quality or fitness or sample, then the buyer can only claim damages for a breach of warranty. This amendment moderates the traditionally strict approach of English Law to contractual breach in a commercial context. Similarly, the right to reject goods can be lost, and only a breach of warranty asserted, if the buyer "accepts" the goods (Section 11(4)). Acceptance will have occurred if the buyer states that they accept the goods, uses them in a manner inconsistent with the seller's continued ownership, or allows a "reasonable time" to pass without rejecting them (Section 35(1) and (4)). The right to reject may be modified or excluded by agreement between the buyer and seller, so long as the contractual wording makes clear that this is the case. The case of Aston FFI (Suisse) SA v Louis Dreyfus Commodities Suisse SA, using GAFTA terms and conditions, is an example of a case where the High Court has found that such a "stipulation in clear terms" was lacking.

Section 12 incorporates into the contract a term that the seller either has legal title to the property to be sold or that he will have title at the time when property is to pass.

Section 13(1) provides that where the buyer is sold goods by description, the goods must correspond with this description. Harlingdon v Christopher Hull held that this implied term may only be breached if the buyer relied upon the description. Therefore, if the buyer is an expert, reliance may not be established.

Section 14 states that terms are implicitly about quality and title and are only relevant where the seller is acting in the course of a business. There is no requirement as to the status of the buyer. The phrase "in the course of a business" has received much judicial consideration. Some judges have applied definitions found in other acts, but the case of Stevenson v Rogers gives a wide definition to this requirement. It will encompass activity which is ancillary or loosely related to the business of a company. To use Richards' example, a bank that sells a company car will be acting in the course of a business.

Satisfactory quality, s 14(2)
The quality of the goods sold must be satisfactory (prior to 1994, this provision required 'merchantable' quality; this requirement has been retained in most Commonwealth versions of the Act). The Act provides an objective test to determine satisfactory quality; the standard that a reasonable person would regard as satisfactory, taking into account the price, description and any other relevant factors. The courts have identified certain factors that may raise or lower the expectation of satisfaction. Second hand goods, per Bernstein v. Pamson Motors Ltd., will attract a lower expectation. On the other hand, goods of a reputable brand may attract a higher expectation, the judge in Bernstien used the example of a small ping on a Rolls-Royce being unsatisfactory. 'Other relevant factors' may include advertising in the case of consumer contracts.

Fitness for purpose, s14(3)
If the buyer expressly or implicitly makes his purpose for the goods known to the seller, the seller is obliged to make sure the goods provided are fit for that purpose, if it is reasonable for the buyer to rely on the seller's expertise. An example of the application of this provision can be found in Godley v Perry.

Under section 15, when goods are bought by bulk and the buyer has tested or examined a small number of those goods, the seller is obliged to make sure that every item in the bulk corresponds with the quality of the sample tested or examined.

Section 15A refers to a buyer's general right to reject goods for failure to match the description or to meet the implied conditions about quality or fitness in sections 13–15.

=== Part III, effects of the contract ===
Sections 16 to 26 concern a contract's effects, and in particular the transfer of property and title. Under section 16, property (ownership) cannot pass unless the goods are ascertained (the actual goods to be sold are identified). Section 18 provides presumptions to determine when property will pass, both for specific goods (ascertained at the time of the contract) and goods unascertained at the time of contracting. These 'rules' can be excluded by contrary implication or express agreement.

Rule 1: in an unconditional contract for sale and delivery of specific goods in a deliverable state, property passes immediately on contract formation.
Rule 2: where the seller is bound to perform some condition before the sale is possible, property passes when this condition is performed.
Rule 3: where the seller is bound to measure or weigh the goods to ascertain the price, property passes when this is done and the buyer is notified.
Rule 4: when goods are delivered on sale or return, or on approval, property passes when the buyer adopts the transaction (or fails to give notice of rejection within a reasonable time).
Rule 5: in a sale of unascertained goods, the property will pass following an unconditional appropriation of goods or, where the sale is from a specified bulk, following ascertainment by exhaustion (i.e. removal of all the goods in the bulk but those destined for the buyer).
Seller does not have title
if the seller does not own the goods, the buyer generally cannot gain title, but he can sue for breach of the implied term as to title. This is subject to numerous exceptions in closely defined circumstances, for example under section 2 of the Factors Act 1889, and ss. 21, 24, 25 SGA 1979.

Seller has voidable title
where the seller holds voidable title, title can pass to a buyer in good faith. If title is voided before the contract of sale is concluded, title cannot pass.

=== Part IV, contract performance ===
Part IV, sections 27 to 39, concerns "performance of the contract".

Under section 29, concerning the place of transfer, where location is not stipulated, the buyer must collect the goods at the seller's place of business, if there is one. The seller must be prepared to deliver them to the entrance of his place of business. If the contract was concluded by a means of communication at a distance and the buyer is a consumer, this provision is disapplied and the Consumer Protection (Distance Selling) Regulations 2000 apply instead. However, it is changed today and what applies is The Consumer Contracts (Information, Cancellation and Additional Charges) Regulations 2013.

Section 35 concerns the buyer's acceptance (see J & H Ritchie Ltd v Lloyd Ltd [2007] UKHL 9).

Section 35A concerns a buyer's right of partial rejection and partial acceptance.

=== Part V, rights of unpaid seller ===
Within six months, beginning at the time at which the goods were delivered, the buyer can require the seller to repair the goods, reduce the price, or rescind (revesting property and requiring the return of any payment) the contract where the buyer successfully claims that the goods were not in accordance with the contract at the time of delivery. The seller can defeat this claim if (a) "it is established that the goods did so conform" at the time of delivery, or (b) the measure is "incompatible with the nature of the goods or the nature of the lack of conformity.

Consumer requires repair or replacement
The seller must repair or replace the goods within a reasonable amount of time, incurring all costs necessary to perform this task. This cannot be required if it is impossible or disproportionate in consideration of other available remedies.

Consumer requires reduction or rescission
This is only available where repair or replacement is impossible or the seller is taking an unreasonable amount of time to perform these requirements. Any reimbursement must take into account any use that the buyer has had out of the goods.

=== Part VI, actions for breach of contract ===
Sections 49 to 54 concern actions for breach of contract.

Sections 49 and 50 protect sellers' rights.

Sections 51 to 53 (and 53A in Scotland) relate to damages due to a buyer for non-delivery of goods, where the seller "wrongfully neglects or refuses to deliver the goods to the buyer", although consumers' rights in this regard are now covered by the Consumer Rights Act. Damages are generally to be estimated according to the "loss directly and naturally resulting, in the ordinary course of events, from the seller’s breach of contract", but where there is "an available market", damages should be calculated prima facie as the difference between the agreed contract price and the "market or current price" facing the buyer needing to secure an alternative supply. The Court of Appeal dealt with a case in 2016 (Hughes v Pengragon Sabre Ltd.) where Pendragon had failed to supply Hughes with a "limited-edition" Porsche car, for which there was no "available market". The ruling calculated damages based on the cost to purchase "the nearest equivalent" car.

Section 52 directs that the court may order specific performance where appropriate if the buyer has applied for this. Such an order would deny the seller the option to "retain the goods on payment of damages". Section 53 concerns remedies for a breach of warranty.

Section 54 concerns "interest etc." The term "etc." embraces "special damages".

=== Part VII, supplementary ===
Terms from the Sale of Goods Act will not be incorporated into the contract where they have been expressly excluded, or express terms conflict with them. These exclusions may be invalid under common law, the Unfair Contract Terms Act 1977, or in consumer cases the Unfair Terms in Consumer Contracts Regulations 1999. If the term excluding these implied terms is struck out, the implied term will be effective.

Under the Unfair Contract Terms Act 1977, section 12 may never be excluded, and sections 13 to 15 may never be excluded where the buyer is a consumer.

=== Repealed enactments ===
Section 63(2) of the act repealed 6 enactments, listed in schedule 3 to the act.

Enactments repealed by section 63(2)
Citation	Short title	Extent of repeal
56 & 57 Vict. c. 71	Sale of Goods Act 1893	The whole act except section 26.
1967 c. 7	Misrepresentation Act 1967	Section 4.
1967 c. 7	Misrepresentation Act 1967	In section 6(3) the words "except section 4(2),".
1967 c. 14 (N.I.)	Misrepresentation Act (Northern Ireland) 1967	Section 4.
1973 c. 13	Supply of Goods (Implied Terms) Act 1973	Sections 1 to 7.
1973 c. 13	Supply of Goods (Implied Terms) Act 1973	Section 18(2).
1974 c. 39	Consumer Credit Act 1974	In Schedule 4, paragraphs 3 and 4.
1977 c. 50	Unfair Contract Terms Act 1977	In Schedule 3, the entries relating to the Sale of Goods Act 1893.

== Future prospects ==
The act was preceded by the UK's original Sale of Goods Act 1893 (56 & 57 Vict. c. 71), a statute drafted by Sir Mackenzie Chalmers. The success of both the 1893 and 1979 statutes was largely down to their conciseness and to Sir Mackenzie's clarity of expression. In the 1990s, a number of short statutes were passed to amend the 1979 act, and a new updated and consolidated act is considered to be overdue.

== See also ==
- English contract law
- UK commercial law
- Sale of Goods Act
- Unfair Contract Terms Act 1977
- Unfair Terms in Consumer Contracts Regulations 1999
