= Sale of Goods Act, 1930 (Bangladesh) =

Sale of Goods Act, 1930 (ACT NO. III OF 1930).

Imperial Legislative Council Jatiyo Sangshad
- Territorial extent: Bangladesh
- Enacted by: British Indian Empire; People's Republic of Bangladesh
- Enacted: 1 March 1911
- Status: Amended

The Sale of Goods Act, 1930 is a commercial law in Bangladesh.

The law was influenced by the Sale of Goods Act 1893, but has several additional provisions. Enacted during the British Raj, the law remains largely untouched. It was re-enacted after Bangladesh's independence in 1971.

== Content ==
The Act includes important definitions, essential elements of contract for the sale of goods, stipulation of sales, transfer of ownership, conditions and warranties, performance of contract of sale, remedial measures, auction sale and rules regarding delivery.

== See also ==
- Sale of Goods Act 1979
- Unfair Contract Terms Act
- Contract Act, 1872 (Bangladesh)
- Patent and Designs Act 1911
