= Fundamental rights of the people of Bangladesh =

The fundamental rights of the people of Bangladesh have been guaranteed in Part III (Article 26-47) of the constitution of Bangladesh. Article 44 of the constitution guarantees the right of every citizen to move the High Court Division in accordance with clause (1) of Article 102 for the enforcement of any of the fundamental rights conferred by Part III of the Constitution. The jurisdiction of the High Court Division of the Supreme Court to enforce the fundamental rights is defined in Article 102 of Part Vl of the Constitution of 1972.

== List of fundamental rights ==
Third part (article 26 to 47A) of the Constitution of Bangladesh mentions the fundamental rights of the citizens of Bangladesh.

27. Equality before law
28. Discrimination on grounds of religion, etc.
29. Equality of opportunity in public employment
30. Prohibition of foreign titles, etc.
31. Right to protection of law
32. Protection of right to life and personal liberty
33. Safeguards as to arrest and detention
34. Prohibition of forced labour
35. Protection in respect of trial and punishment
36. Freedom of movement
37. Freedom of assembly
38. Freedom of association
39. Freedom of thought and conscience, and of speech
40. Freedom of profession or occupation
41. Freedom of religion
42. Rights to property
43. Protection of home and correspondence
44. Enforcement of fundamental rights
45. Modifications of rights in respect of disciplinary law
46. Power to provide indemnity
47. Saving for certain laws
47A. Inapplicability of certain articles

== Infringement of fundamental rights ==
The protection of fundamental rights under the Constitution has been inconsistent, which is why, between 2009 to 2023, during the rule of the Awami League-led government, 2,699 people fell victim to extrajudicial killings in Bangladesh. During the same period, 677 individuals were forcibly disappeared, and 1,048 died in custody, as reported by Odhikar. The organization also noted that if the deaths from the anti-discrimination student protests and related incidents from 2024 are taken into account, the total death toll would exceed 3,000.
