= Special Powers Act, 1974 =

Security law of Bangladesh

The Special Powers Act, 1974

Constitution of Bangladesh
- Long title: An Act to provide for special measures for the prevention of certain prejudicial activities, for more speedy trial and effective punishment of certain grave offences and for matters connected therewith.
- Citation: Act No. XIV of 1974
- Passed by: Jatiya Sangsad
- Passed: 9 February 1974

Legislative history
- Bill citation: The Special Powers Act, 1974 (ACT NO. XIV OF 1974)
- First reading: 29 January 1974
- Second reading: 6 February 1974
- Third reading: 9 February 1974
- Status: In force

Special Powers Act, 1974 is an Act of parliament in Bangladesh. The law allows the government of Bangladesh to detain people indefinitely without bringing any formal charges against them.

== History ==
The act was passed in 1974 to replace the Security Act of Pakistan 1952, the Public Safety Ordinance of 1958 and the Bangladesh Collaborators (Special Tribunals) Order, 1972. The law targets smuggling, hoarding, and damaging actions. The act allows the government to detain individuals on preventive ground. The Awami League dominated parliament in Bangladesh passed the law on 9 February 1974. The Awami League was criticised for passing the law. The law was opposed by Ataur Rahman Khan and Abdus Sattar. Individuals can be detained up to six months without being charged and indefinitely if endorsed by the advisory board constituted under the Act. The Bangladesh Nationalist Party maintained it when they came to power, despite having promised to remove it in their election manifesto. Sheikh Hasina called for its removal but after becoming prime minister called it useful.

In 1990, section 16(2) of the act was repealed through an amendment but the police were filing cases under the section into 2018. The High Court Division ordered the police to stop using the section since it was removed through an act of parliament.

In December 2020, Bangladesh Police charged four persons under the act for vandalizing a statue of Sheikh Mujibur Rahman. In 2022, the government was asked to use the act to take action against food hoarding by traders.

== Criticism ==
In 2022, Bangladesh Jamaat-e-Islami has called for the repeal of the Special Powers Act, along with the Anti-Terrorism Act, 2009, and the Digital Security Act, 2018. The Bangladesh Nationalist Party has also demanded for the removal of the law. An editorial in the Daily Star described the act as "draconian", used by governments to harass their political opponents. Human Rights Watch has similarly urged the government to repeal the law, citing serious human right concerns.
