= Agency in English law =

Agency in English law is the component of UK commercial law that deals with the application of agency law in the United Kingdom, and forms a core set of rules necessary for the smooth functioning of business.

In 1986, the European Communities enacted Directive 86/653/EEC on self-employed commercial agents. In the UK, this was implemented into national law in the Commercial Agents Regulations 1993.

== Authority ==
An agent who acts within the scope of authority conferred by their principal binds the principal in the obligations the agent creates with third parties. There are essentially two kinds of authority recognised in the law: actual authority (whether express or implied) and apparent authority.

=== Actual authority ===
Actual authority can be of two kinds. Either the principal may have expressly conferred authority on the agent, or authority may be implied. Authority arises by consent, and whether it exists is a question of fact. An agent, as a general rule, is only entitled to indemnity from the principal if they have acted within the scope of their actual authority, and if they act outside of that authority they may be in breach of contract, and liable to a third party for breach of the implied warranty of authority.

Express actual authority

Express actual authority means an agent has been expressly told (i.e., explicitly told) they may act on behalf of a principal.

- Ireland v Livingstone (1872) LR 5 HL 395

Implied actual authority

Implied actual authority, also called "usual authority", is authority an agent has by virtue of being reasonably necessary to carry out their express authority. As such, it can be inferred by virtue of a position held by an agent. For example, partners have authority to bind the other partners in the firm, their liability being joint and several, and in a corporation, all executives and senior employees with decision-making authority by virtue of their position have authority to bind the corporation.

- Hely-Hutchinson v Brayhead Ltd [1968] 1 QB 549

=== Apparent authority ===
Apparent authority (also called "ostensible authority") exists where the principal's words or conduct would lead a reasonable person in the third party's position to believe that the agent was authorized to act, even if the principal and the purported agent had never discussed such a relationship. For example, where one person appoints a person to a position which carries with it agency-like powers, those who know of the appointment are entitled to assume that there is apparent authority to do the things ordinarily entrusted to one occupying such a position. If a principal creates the impression that an agent is authorized but there is no actual authority, third parties are protected so long as they have acted reasonably. This is sometimes termed "agency by estoppel" or the "doctrine of holding out", where the principal will be estopped from denying the grant of authority if third parties have changed their positions to their detriment in reliance on the representations made.

- Rama Corporation Ltd v Proved Tin and General Investments Ltd [1952] 2 QB 147, Slade J, "Ostensible or apparent authority... is merely a form of estoppel, indeed, it has been termed agency by estoppel and you cannot call in aid an estoppel unless you have three ingredients: (i) a representation, (ii) reliance on the representation, and (iii) an alteration of your position resulting from such reliance."
- Freeman & Lockyer v Buckhurst Park Properties (Mangal) Ltd [1964] 2 QB 480
- The Raffaella or Egyptian International Foreign Trade Co v Soplex Wholesale Supplies Ltd and PS Refson & Co Ltd [1985] 2 Lloyd's Rep 36
- Armagas Ltd v Mundogas Ltd or The Ocean Frost [1986] AC 717, an agent cannot clothe himself with ostensible authority simply by saying that he has authority
- Hudson Bay Apparel Brands Llc v Umbro International Ltd [2010] EWCA Civ 949

=== Watteau v Fenwick ===
In the case of Watteau v Fenwick, Lord Coleridge CJ on the Queen's Bench concurred with an opinion by Wills J that a third party could hold personally liable a principal who he did not know about when he sold cigars to an agent that was acting outside of its authority. Wills J held that "the principal is liable for all the acts of the agent which are within the authority usually confided to an agent of that character, notwithstanding limitations, as between the principal and the agent, put upon that authority." This decision is heavily criticised and doubted, though not entirely overruled in the UK. It is sometimes referred to as "usual authority" (though not in the sense used by Lord Denning MR in Hely-Hutchinson, where it is synonymous with "implied actual authority"). It has been explained as a form of apparent authority, or "inherent agency power".

=== Operation of law ===
- China-Pacific SA v Food Corporation of India or The Winson [1982] AC 939

=== Ratification ===
- Keighley, Maxsted & Co v Durant [1901] AC 240
- Bolton Partners v Lambert (1889) 41 ChD 295

== Disclosure ==
=== Disclosed agency ===
- Montgomerie v United Kingdom Mutual Steamship Association [1891] 1 QB 370, Wright J
- Irvine & Co v Watson & Sons (1880) 5 QBD 414, Bramwell LJ, settlement with the agent
- Thomson v Davenport (1829) 9 B&C 78, merger and election
- Debenham's Ltd v Perkins (1925) 13 LT 252
- Lewis v Nicholson and Parker (1852) 18 QB 503, between agent and third party
- Universal Steam Navigation Co Ltd v James McKelvie & Co [1923] AC 492
- Bridges & Salmon Ltd v The Swan (Owner) or The Swan [1968] 1 Lloyd's Rep 5
- N&J Vlassopulos Ltd v Ney Shipping Ltd or The Santa Carina [1977] 1 Lloyd's Rep 478, Lord Denning MR, oral contracts
- Rayner v Grote (1846) 15 M&W 359
- Yonge v Toynbee [1910] 1 KB 215

=== Undisclosed agency ===
- Siu Yin Kwan v Eastern Insurance Co Ltd [1994] 2 AC 199
- Keighley, Maxsted & Co v Durant [1901] AC 240, Lord Lindley
- Fred Drughorn Ltd v Rederiaktiebolaget Trans-Atlantic [1919] AC 203, exclusion of undisclosed principal by contract terms
- Said v Butt [1920] 3 KB 497
- Dyster v Randall & Sons [1926] Ch 932
- Greer v Downs Supply Co [1927] 2 KB 28
- Rolls-Royce Power Engineering plc v Ricardo Consulting Engineering Ltd [2003] EWHC 2871
- Clarkson Booker Ltd v Andjel [1964] 2 QB 775
- Cooke & Sons v Eshelby (1887) 12 App Cas 271
- Armstrong v Stokes (1872) LR 7 QB 598, Blackburn J, settlement with the agent

== Principal and agent relations ==
=== Duties of agent ===
- Chaudhry v Prabhakar [1989] 1 WLR 29, duty of care
- Bristol and West Building Society v Mothew [1998] Ch 1, fiduciary duties
- Henderson v Merrett Syndicates Ltd [1995] 2 AC 145
- Armstrong v Jackson [1917] 2 KB 822
- Kelly v Cooper [1993] AC 205
- Boston Deep Sea Fishing and Ice Co v Ansell (1888) 39 Ch D 339, duty to not accept bribes. (Note: Boston Deep Sea Fishing and Ice Company v Ansell, (1888) 39 Ch D 339, is an 1888 English law case which established that the summary dismissal of an employee may be justified by the subsequent discovery of misconduct of which the principal or employer was unaware at the time of dismissal, and therefore substitute a "good" reason for a "bad" reason to justify the dismissal. The Court of Appeal held (reversing the decision of Kekewich, J. at first instance), that Mr. Ansell's receipt of a commission from a shipbuilding company supplying the company "was good ground for dismissal, although it was not discovered till after the dismissal had taken place; and although it happened several months previously, and might have been an isolated act". In subsequent case law, the principle adopted by the court has been referred to as the "Boston Deep Sea Fishing principle".)
- Industries & General Mortgage Co Ltd v Lewis [1949] 2 All ER 573
- Attorney General for Hong Kong v Reid [1994] 1 AC 324
- De Bussche v Alt (1878) 8 ChD 286, duty to not delegate authority
- Calico Printers' Association Ltd v Barclays Bank Ltd (1931) 145 LT 51

=== Rights of agent ===
- Way v Latilla [1937] 3 All ER 759, contractual right to remuneration
- Millar, Son & Co v Radford (1903) 19 TLR 575, work effective cause of services
- Luxor (Eastbourne) Ltd v Cooper [1941] AC 108, opportunity for commission
- Rhodes v Fielder, Jones and Harrison (1919) 89 LJKB 159, reimbursement and indemnity

=== Reciprocal duties of principals and commercial agents ===
The Commercial Agents Regulations require agents to act “dutifully and in good faith” in performing their activities (Reg. 3); co-extensively, principals are required to act “dutifully and in good faith” in their “relations” with their commercial agents (Reg 4). Though there is no statutory definition of this obligation to act “dutifully and in good faith”, it has been suggested that it requires principals and agents to act "with honesty, openness and regard for the interests of the other party to the transaction".

- Npower Direct Ltd v South of Scotland Power Ltd [2005] EWHC 2123
- Rossetti Marketing Ltd v Diamond Sofa Co Ltd [2011] EWHC 2482 (QB)
- Simpson v Grant & Bowman Limited [2006] EuLR 933

=== Termination of agency ===
- Campanari v Woodburn (1854) 15 CB 400
- Frith v Frith [1906] AC 254
- Lonsdale v Howard & Hallam Ltd [2007] UKHL 32, indemnity and compensation
- Drew v Nunn (1879) 4 QBD 661

== See also ==
- Law of agency
- UK commercial law
- UK company law
- UK competition law
- Bailment and Coggs v Barnard
- EC Directive 86/653, on commercial agents
