= Agency agreement =

Type of legal contract

An agency agreement is a legal contract creating a fiduciary relationship whereby the first party ("the principal") agrees that the actions of a second party ("the agent") binds the principal to later agreements made by the agent as if the principal had himself personally made the later agreements. The power of the agent to bind the principal is usually legally referred to as authority. Agency created via an agreement may be a form of implied authority, such as when a person gives their credit card to a close relative, the cardholder may be required to pay for purchases made by the relative with their credit card.

Many states employ the equal dignity rule whereby the agency agreement must be in writing if the later agreement would also necessarily be written, such as a contract to buy thousands of dollars' worth of goods.

An example of the existence of an agency agreement at issue in a 2006 court case arose when a tennis tournament sponsor sued Venus and Serena Williams for not participating. The sponsor argued that their father, Richard Williams, had committed to their participation in the tournament. The Williams sisters argued that their father did not have the authority to bind them to such an agreement. If their father did commit the sisters to play, the issue for the court to decide is whether a valid agency agreement existed between the Williams sisters and their father. If not, then they likely were not bound to his agreement under the law of agency.

Manufacturers and suppliers of goods frequently appoint agents to act on their behalf in promoting sales, both in the home country of the manufacturer as well as overseas. A formal agreement is usually signed setting out the commission the agent will receive, the territory, duration and other terms on which the principal and agent will do business together.

Within the European Union, there is legislation designed to give some protection to agents, in particular the right to compensation in certain circumstances when an agency is terminated. The same applies in other parts of the world and in some countries it is necessary for a foreign manufacturer to appoint as agent an individual or company that is a national of the country where the agency will operate.

An agent should be distinguished from a distributor—in commercial parlance, a distributor will buy stock from the supplier or principal and then sell it on to his customers at a mark-up, whereas an agent will find customers for the principal who then sells direct to the customers and pays commission to the agent.

== See also ==
- Fiduciary management
