= Implied authority =

Implied authority to contract is a legal term in contract law referring to the implied ability of an individual to make a legally binding contract on behalf of an organization by way of uniform or interaction with the public on behalf of that organization. For example, a person carries implied authority when they are wearing a uniform or nametag bearing the logo or trademark of a business or organization, or when they are functioning in an authorized capacity on behalf of a business or organization. A job title such as "sales director" would usually be an indication of a company's implied authority to enter into a sales contract.

An implied authority is authority that is not expressly granted by the contract, but that is assumed by the agent in order to have the ability to transact insurance business on behalf of the principal, regardless of what the contract specifically states.

Besides implied authority, the terms apparent authority or express authority may apply, these three being known as The Agency Relationship. In relation to company law, apparent authority is usually referred to as "ostensible authority".

== India ==
Section 186 of the Indian Contract Act 1872 provides that an agent's authority may be express or implied. Section 187 adds that "An authority is said to be express when it is given by words, spoken or written. An authority is said to be implied when it is to be inferred from the circumstances of the case; and things spoken or written or the ordinary course of dealing, may be accounted circumstances of the case". The Act also includes an "illustration" of how this section operates:

"A owns a shop in Serampore, living himself in Calcutta, and visiting the shop occasionally. The shop is managed by B, and he is in the habit of ordering goods from C in the name of A for the purposes of the shop, and of paying for them out of A's funds with A's knowledge. B has an implied authority from A to order goods in the name of A for the purpose of the shop."

== See also ==
- Hely-Hutchinson v Brayhead Ltd (1968)
