= Josiah Symon =

Australian politician

The Honourable Sir Josiah Symon KCMG QC
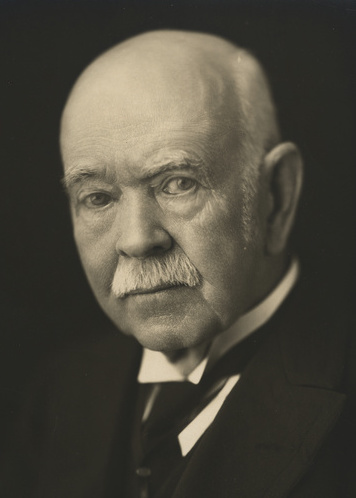
- Symon in 1920

Attorney-General of Australia
- In office 17 August 1904 – 5 July 1905
- Prime Minister: George Reid
- Preceded by: H. B. Higgins
- Succeeded by: Isaac Isaacs

Leader of the Opposition in the Senate
- In office 5 July 1905 – 21 November 1907
- Preceded by: Gregor McGregor
- Succeeded by: Edward Millen
- In office 6 June 1901 – 18 August 1904
- Preceded by: none
- Succeeded by: Gregor McGregor

Leader of the Government in the Senate
- In office 18 August 1904 – 5 July 1905
- Preceded by: Gregor McGregor
- Succeeded by: Tom Playford II

Senator for South Australia
- In office 30 March 1901 – 30 June 1913
- Preceded by: parliament established
- Succeeded by: James O'Loghlin

Attorney-General of South Australia
- In office 10 March 1881 – 24 June 1881
- Preceded by: William Henry Bundey
- Succeeded by: John Downer

Member of the South Australian House of Assembly
- In office April 1881 – April 1887
- Constituency: Sturt

Personal details
- Born: 27 September 1846 Wick, Highland, Scotland
- Died: 29 March 1934 (aged 87) North Adelaide, South Australia
- Party: Free Trade (1901–06); Anti-Socialist (1906–09); Independent (1909–13)
- Spouse: Mary Cowle (m. 1881)
- Occupation: Barrister, politician

Sir Josiah Henry Symon KCMG KC (27 September 1846 – 29 March 1934) was an Australian lawyer and politician. He was a Senator for South Australia from 1901 to 1913 and Attorney-General of Australia from 1904 to 1905.

Symon was born in Wick, Caithness, Scotland. He immigrated to South Australia in 1866 and became one of the colony's leading barristers. He was appointed Attorney-General of South Australia in 1881, serving only a few months, and won election to the Parliament of South Australia in the same year. Symon supported the federation movement and won election to the Senate at the 1901 federal election. He served as Attorney-General in the Reid government (1904–1905). After his death he donated his extensive personal collection to the State Library of South Australia.

== Early life ==
Symon was born in Wick, a town in the county of Caithness in the Scottish Highlands, in 1846. He was educated at Stirling High School, where he was the dux in 1862, before attending the Free Church Training College in Edinburgh. His brother, David Symon, was a member of the Legislative Assembly of Western Australia. He was a distant cousin of Magnus Cormack, who was also born in Wick and served as President of the Senate in the 1970s.

In 1866 he emigrated to South Australia and was employed as an articled clerk with his cousin, J. D. Sutherland, a solicitor in the city of Mount Gambier. The leader of the South Australian Bar Association at the time (and a future Chief Justice of South Australia), Samuel Way, noticed Symon's work and invited him to join his firm. Symon, having completed his studies, was called to the bar in 1871, and admitted to practice as a barrister. In 1872, after the death of one of the partners at Way's firm, Symon became a partner alongside Way. In 1876, Way was appointed as a judge, and Symon bought out his part of the business.

== Colonial politics ==
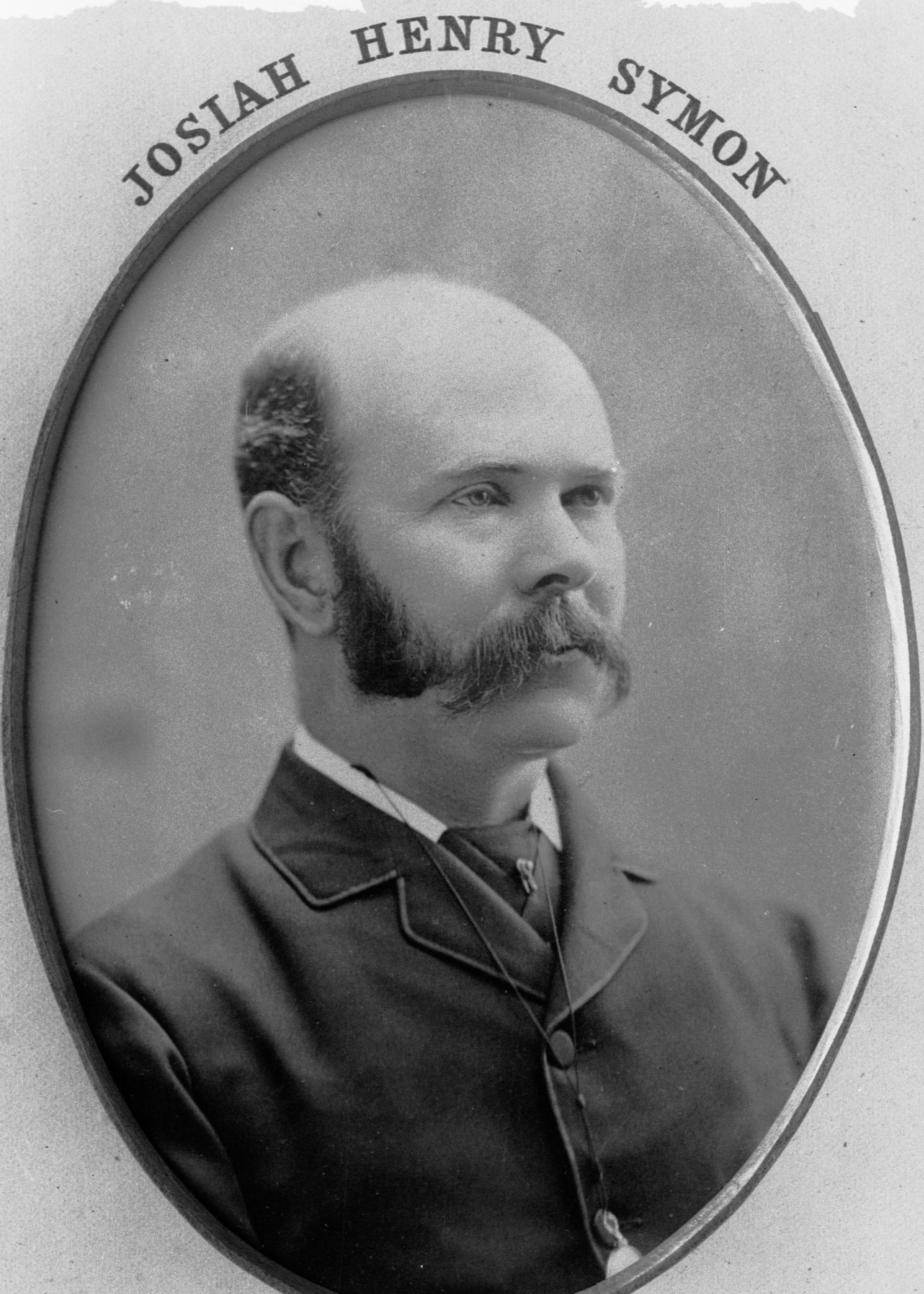
Symon c. 1881

In March 1881, Symon was made Attorney-General of South Australia in the Morgan government, although at the time he had not been elected to the Parliament of South Australia. He was elected as the member for Sturt in the South Australian House of Assembly several weeks later. However, the Morgan government lost power on 24 June of that year, and Symon lost his position as Attorney-General. Later in 1881, Symon was made a Queen's Counsel, and on 8 December of that year he married Mary Cowle, with whom he was to have five sons and seven daughters. In 1884, Symon was offered a judicial position, but he declined to accept it. He travelled to England in 1886, and was offered a nomination for a seat in the British House of Commons, however he declined this opportunity also. In 1887, after returning to Australia, he lost his seat in the South Australian parliament.

He was a highly effective and ruthless advocate: in 1889 he successfully prosecuted the William Hutchison libel case against J. B. Mather and George Ash of The Narracoorte Herald. In his highly technical argument he succeeded in having evidence from Hansard and Crown Law documents ruled as inadmissible. Ash (who conducted his own defence) then turned to politics and law, and after his untimely death received glowing tributes from Symon.

Symon was an ardent supporter of the cause of Federation, and frustrated by the apathy the question commonly received in South Australia. He successfully stood as a candidate for the Australasian Federal Convention of 1897-8, and was on the side of the majority in 71 percent of its divisions; a higher percentage than the great bulk of delegates. In the subsequent struggle to win the support of the electorate for the proposed federal constitution, he was a significant behind the scenes player, sought out by Alfred Deakin, for example, to arrange funding for Federationist candidates in the NSW general election of 1898. Symon was knighted on the day of the proclamation of the new Commonwealth.

== Federal politics ==
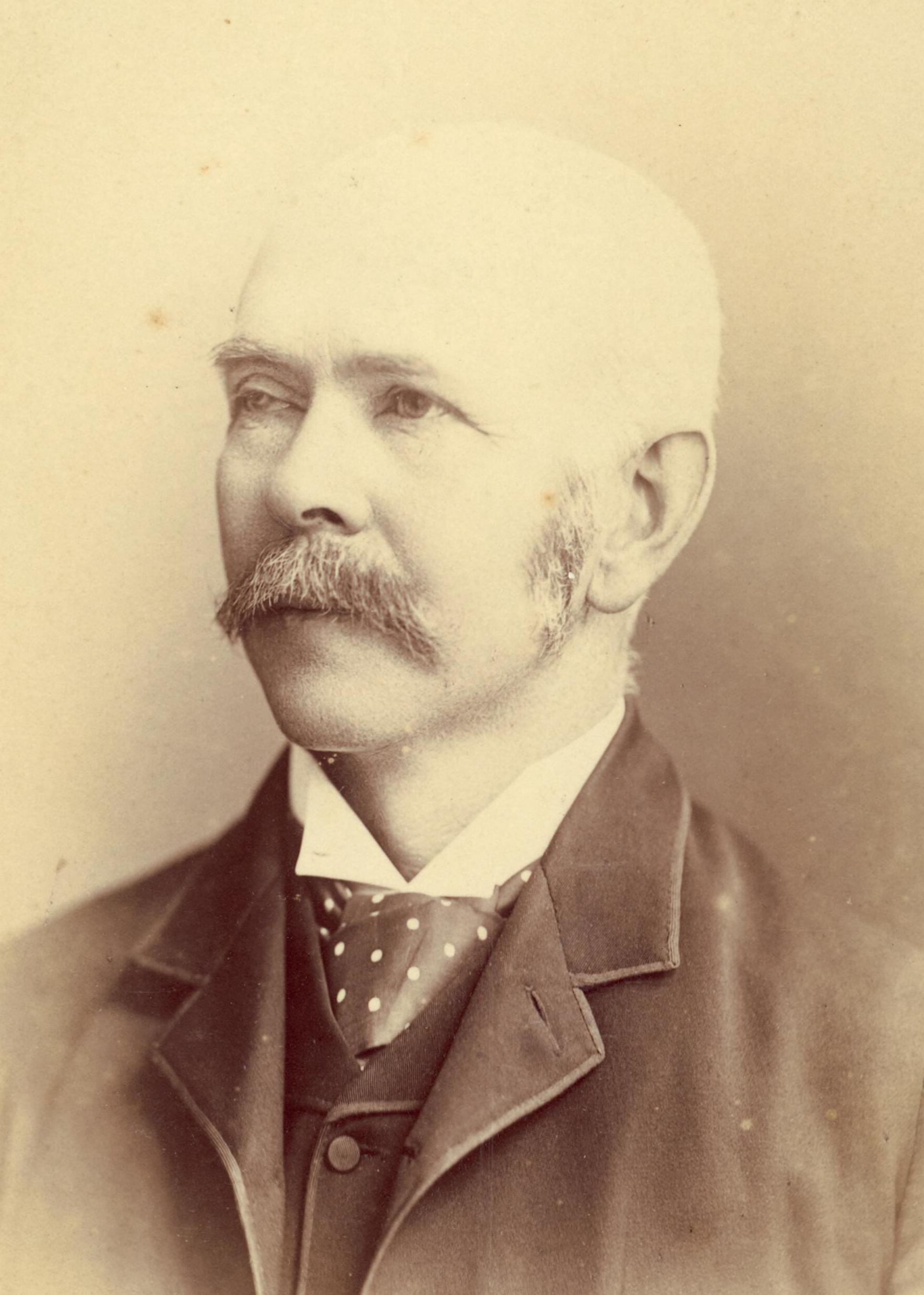
Undated photo

Symon stood for election to the Australian Senate at the 1901 election for the Free Trade Party, and was placed first overall by the voters of South Australia. He was made leader of the opposition in the Senate, and was a leader within the Free Trade Party on tariff policy. After being elected to the Parliament, he stood down from his position as a member of the council of the University of Adelaide, a position he had held since 1897. In 1902, he was involved as the defense council in the highly publicised murder of Bertha Schippan trial. At the 1903 election he again topped the poll for the Senate in South Australia. When the High Court of Australia was created in late 1903, Symon was mentioned in the press as a possible judge of the court, although ultimately he was not appointed. From August 1904 to July 1905 he was the Attorney-General of Australia in the Reid Ministry.

Symon was renowned as a tough and uncompromising politician. He has been described as both an "eloquent and emotional speaker" and often "abrasive and argumentative." Late in 1904, Symon was involved in a dispute with the judges of the High Court. In the court's early years, its official home was a courtroom in Melbourne, although it often sat at the court in the Sydney suburb of Darlinghurst. Justices Barton and O'Connor lived in Sydney, but Chief Justice of Australia Sir Samuel Griffith lived in Brisbane, and took a two-day train ride to attend each sitting in Melbourne. When Griffith asked for some bookshelves to be installed in the Darlinghurst courthouse, so that his law library might be moved from his offices in Brisbane, Symon criticised Griffith for holding any sittings outside Melbourne, and began intrusive inspections of the judges' travel expenses. Prime Minister George Reid tried to intervene, and Griffith even took the extraordinary step of delaying scheduled sittings early in 1905. The stand-off was resolved when the Reid government left power, and the new Attorney-General (and future Chief Justice) Isaac Isaacs permitted the judges to travel. Later, in 1930, when Symon was president of the Adelaide branch of the Royal Empire Society, he was an outspoken opponent of James Scullin's nomination of Isaacs as Governor-General of Australia.

After visiting the future site of Canberra in August 1906, Symon joined those supporting it as the location of the national capital, stating that "the site seems to me an ideal one".

In 1909, when the Free Trade Party and the Protectionist Party merged to form the Commonwealth Liberal Party, Symon was one of a small group of politicians who did not join, instead remaining in Parliament as an independent. Symon did not hold any other ministerial positions, and eventually left the Senate after losing his seat in the 1913 election. He continued to practice as a barrister until his retirement in 1923 at the age of seventy-seven.

== Death and recognition ==
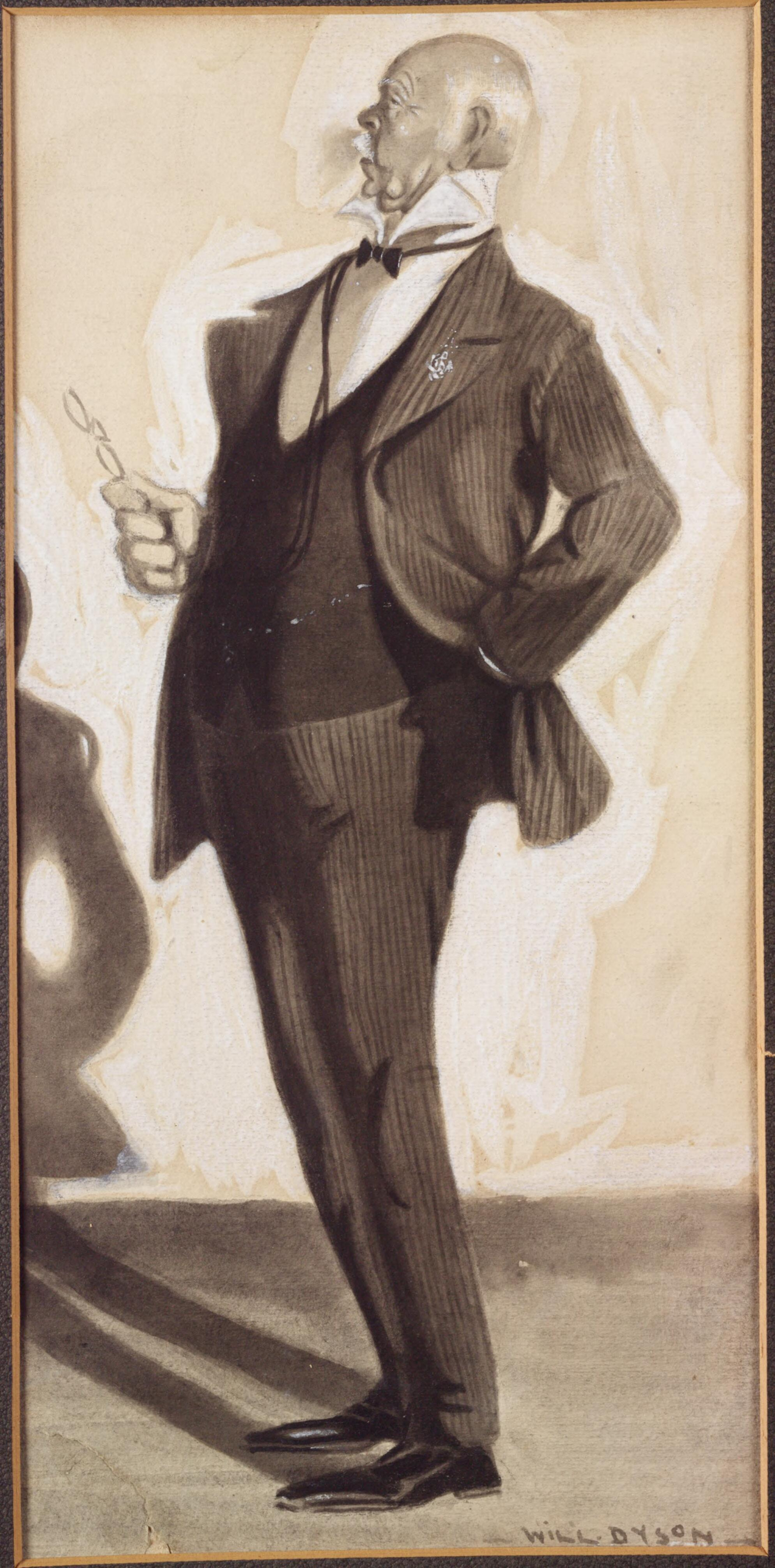
Caricature by Will Dyson

Symon died in 1934, and was given a state funeral. He was survived by his wife, his five sons and five of his seven daughters. In addition to bequeathing his library, Symon also left money for the establishment of scholarships at the University of Sydney, Scotch College in Adelaide and Stirling High School, which he had attended in his youth.

The Canberra suburb of Symonston is named for him.

The Lady Symon Building, designed by Woods, Bagot, Jory and Laybourne-Smith and built in 1927 as part of the Union Buildings at the University of Adelaide, was named after his wife.

== Philanthropy ==
Symon was a lover of history and literature, and was nominated as a founding member of the Parliamentary Library Committee, which oversees the Parliament of Australia Parliamentary Library. Symon, along with Tasmanian Senator John Keating, who was also on the committee, suggested that historical documents relating to Australia but kept in the United Kingdom be brought to Australia. In 1907 he visited the Public Record Office in London while on a holiday, and campaigned for the logbooks of Captain James Cook's ships HM Bark Endeavour and HMS Resolution to be brought to Australia, in the same way that the log of the Mayflower had been taken to Boston in the United States. Though unsuccessful, Symon continued the campaign on his return to Australia, and in 1909 moved a resolution in the Senate to call for the logs to be brought to Australia. Although the logs were never given to Australia, the original copy of the Constitution of Australia was brought to Australia in 1990, after campaigning by Prime Minister Bob Hawke in a tradition which historians link to Symon.

Symon had a massive personal collection of approximately ten thousand books, which he ultimately bequeathed to the State Library of South Australia. He had already donated his collection of law texts to the Law School at the University of Adelaide in 1924. Symon also wrote and published a number of books, including Shakespeare at Home, published in 1905, and Shakespeare the Englishman, published in 1929. Some of Symon's lectures on Shakespeare were published in pamphlet form.

Political offices
Preceded by H.B. Higgins	Attorney General of Australia; 1904–1905	Succeeded by Isaac Isaacs
