= George Ash (Australian politician) =

Australian politician

George Ash (19 September 1859 – 23 February 1897) was a newspaper editor, lawyer and parliamentarian in colonial South Australia.

== Life and career ==
Ash was born near London and on leaving school found employment with one of the large railway companies. A year later he started working for a legal firm, but found the work irksome and started with a large warehouse on Four Street. Then in 1877 he and a comrade set sail for Cape Colony, where he worked as a reporter for the Kaffrarian Watchman. He served in the Kaffir War as a volunteer in order to report on the conflict.

He next travelled to South Australia and secured a position with The Border Watch of Mount Gambier, and was sent by proprietors A. F. Laurie and J. Watson to Naracoorte to work on The Narracoorte Herald, which they owned. In 1880 he and J. B. Mather took over The Narracoorte Herald, and made quite a success of it, but lost everything in 1890 after they were successfully sued for libel by William Hutchison, of Morambro Station for questioning his suitability for the post of Justice of the Peace after his proven record of dummying. It is worth noting that Ash had consistently fought against dummyism: one of his first editorials, in 1881, inveighed against the practice, and was read and praised in the House of Assembly.

Hutchison won the case through J. H. Symon, Q C.'s highly technical attack, in which he managed to have most of Ash's evidence, including Hansard and the Government Gazette ruled inadmissible. Ash, who conducted his own defence, received a great deal of sympathy, particularly among small farmers, and was elected to the seat of Albert in the South Australian House of Assembly, serving from April 1890 with Andrew Dods Handyside as colleague, until his final illness. He was a Freetrader, favoured Federation and political equality of men and women.

Charles Kingston, who had been following his career with interest, offered Ash a position with his law firm Kingston & Hall. Ash enrolled with the University of Adelaide and after a stellar academic career received his LL.B. two years later. After serving his articles Ash was taken into partnership and Hall withdrew.

A teetotaler, non-smoker and diligent Member with an immense capacity for hard work, he was a regular visitor to the insane asylums, and fought for separate facilities for children, leading to the establishment of Minda Home.

== Death ==
He died in a South Terrace private hospital of haemorrhage following a bout of typhoid fever. Tributes were paid to his memory by Sir John Downer, S. J. Way and his old adversary J. H. Symon among others.

Ash Place, in the Canberra suburb of Gilmore, is named in his honour.

== Family ==
He married Helen "Nellie" Malcolm (c. 1863 – 13 March 1944) of Naracoorte around 1885; they had five children, the youngest born just four weeks before his death. After leaving Naracoorte around 1890 they lived at Woodville, then "Tyne Bank", Magill. Nellie later lived at Brigalow Avenue, Kensington Gardens.

- Amy Adeline Ash (1885–1954) married Victor Leslie Illman ( – ) of Balaklava on 7 January 1912
- Albert Amberley Ash (14 April 1888 – 26 January 1961) married Ethel Minnie Grimshaw (1883–1941) on 9 August 1913. He married again, to Eva Doris Mackay ( – ) on 7 July 1945
- Annie Adelaide Ash (22 September 1890 – 21 July 1985) married Alexander Roy Kelly (1886–1963) on 9 April 1913
- Sergeant Arthur Addison Ash (2 August 1892 – 25 February 1917) was wounded in Gallipoli, killed in action in France during WWI
- Corporal Leslie Emerson Ash (18 October 1894 – ) married Dorothy Kathleen Stevens ( – ) on 22 March 1918

== See also ==
- Edgar, Suzanne (1979). "Ash, George (1859–1897)". Australian Dictionary of Biography. National Centre of Biography, Australian National University. ISBN 978-0-522-84459-7. ISSN 1833-7538. OCLC 70677943.
