= United Kingdom commercial law =

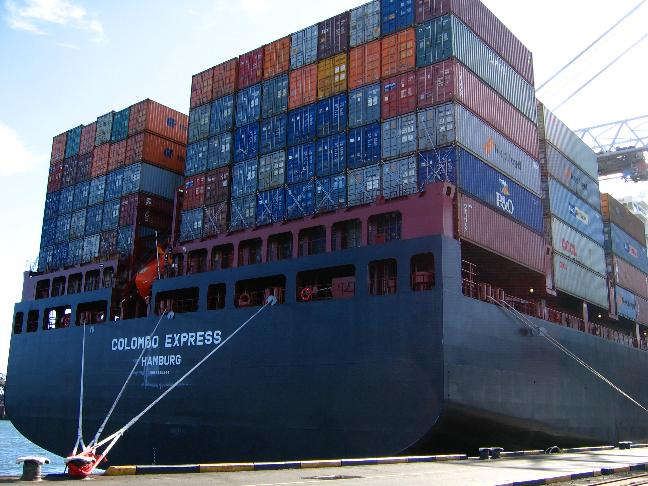
Goods being transported by container ship.

United Kingdom commercial law is the law which regulates the sale and purchase of goods and services, when doing business in the United Kingdom.

== History ==
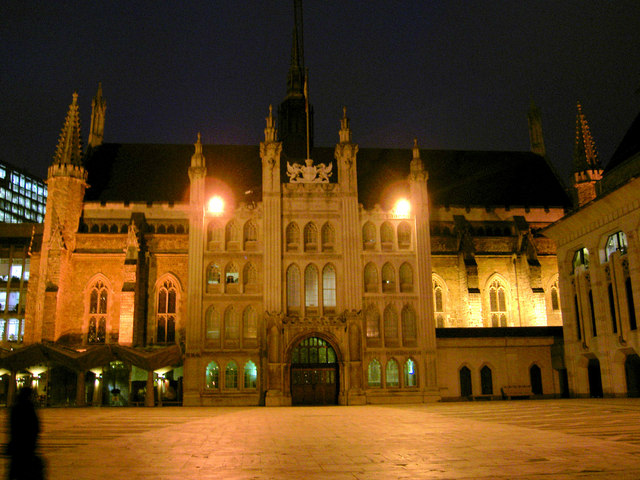
The Guildhall, London was the administrative centre of London's medieval trade. Its most famous inhabitant, mythologised in the 19th century play, was Dick Whittington and His Cat who came when he heard that "London streets are paved with gold".

- Lex Mercatoria
- Hanseatic league
- Guild
- Mercantilism
- Freedom of contract
- Laissez faire

== Foundations ==
=== Personal property ===
- Real property and personal property
- Ownership
- Equitable ownership
- Possession
- Attornment
- Bailment

=== Contracts ===
- Commercial contracts

=== Agency ===
In the case of Watteau v Fenwick, Lord Coleridge CJ on the Queen's Bench concurred with an opinion by Wills J that a third party could hold personally liable a principal who he did know about when he sold cigars to an agent that was acting outside of its authority. Wills J held that "the principal is liable for all the acts of the agent which are within the authority usually confided to an agent of that character, notwithstanding limitations, as between the principal and the agent, put upon that authority." This decision is heavily criticised and doubted, though not entirely overruled in the UK. It is sometimes referred to as "usual authority" (though not in the sense used by Lord Denning MR in Hely-Hutchinson, where it is synonymous with "implied actual authority"). It has been explained as a form of apparent authority, or "inherent agency power".

- Hely-Hutchinson v Brayhead Ltd [1968] 1 QB 549
- Creation and authority of agents
- Disclosed and undisclosed agency
- Agent duties and rights
- Termination of agency

== Sale of goods ==
=== Sale of Goods Act 1979 ===
- Sale of Goods Act 1979, the primary statute applicable to the sale of goods.

=== Property passing and delivery ===
- Title retention clause

=== Terms, acceptance and rejection ===
- Unfair Contract Terms Act 1977
- Consumer Protection (Distance Selling) Regulations 2000

=== Remedies and duties ===
- United Nations Convention on Contracts for the International Sale of Goods
- UNCITRAL Model Law on International Commercial Arbitration

== Bills of exchange and banking ==
- Negotiable instrument
- Bill of exchange
- Bank regulation
- Payment systems
- Cheques

== International sales ==
- United Nations Convention on Contracts for the International Sale of Goods
- Free alongside ship contract
- Free on board contract
- Cost, insurance, freight contract

== Commercial credit and security ==
=== Possessory security ===
- Pledges
- Liens

=== Non-possessory security ===
- Mortgage
- Equitable charge
- Equitable lien

== Insurance law ==
- Life Assurance Act 1774
- uberrimae fidei
- Subrogation
- Marine insurance and Marine Insurance Act 1906

== See also ==
- International commercial law
- Islamic Commercial Law
- UK competition law
- UK labour law
- UK company law
- European Union Value Added Tax
- Bill of lading
- Principal (commercial law)
- Centre for Commercial Law Studies
