= South Eastern Times =

Australian newspaper

The South Eastern Times is a newspaper established in Millicent, South Australia in 1891, advertised on its masthead as covering the area which includes Millicent, Robe, Beachport, Tantanoola, Kalangadoo and Southend. After 129 years of publishing, however, the newspaper (along with sister publication The Pennant) was discontinued on 21 August 2020. However, in March 2022 the newspaper was relaunched by TBW Today Pty Ltd after an 18-month hiatus.

== History ==
A weekly paper named the Millicent Times was founded in July 1891 by Roland Campbell and was taken over in 1894 by his brother Donald Campbell. The Campbells severed connection with the paper in 1901. It was taken over by a consortium of businessmen led by Henrich Wilhelm Altschwager, and in 1906 given a new title, though the old name persisted, at least colloquially. The first managing editor was J. C. Harper, of Woodend, Victoria, who left for Broken Hill in 1907 to manage the Barrier Truth. It became, like its competitor The Border Watch, a twice weekly publication.

Reuben Cranstoun Mowbray, who had recently arrived from Gippsland, Victoria to take a position as reporter, became editor. He became the major shareholder then in 1921 sole owner. In 1952 Mowbray left, selling the business to the newspaper's staff. Bob Chewings became editor following Reuben Mowbray and remained in the role until his retirement in 1989. The McRostie family were the proprietors from 1989 until 2006 when the business was sold to Allan Scott. Scott died in 2008 and the business remained in the family as part of The Border Watch Media Group. The newspaper ceased publication in August 2020.

The newspaper was relaunched by TBW Today Pty Ltd in March 2022 along with its sister publication the Penola Pennant.

== Awards ==
The newspaper won the Country Press SA Newspaper of the Year: Under 2500 circulation in 2012, 2013 and 2015.
