= Penola, South Australia =

Town in southern South Australia

Penola
- Town
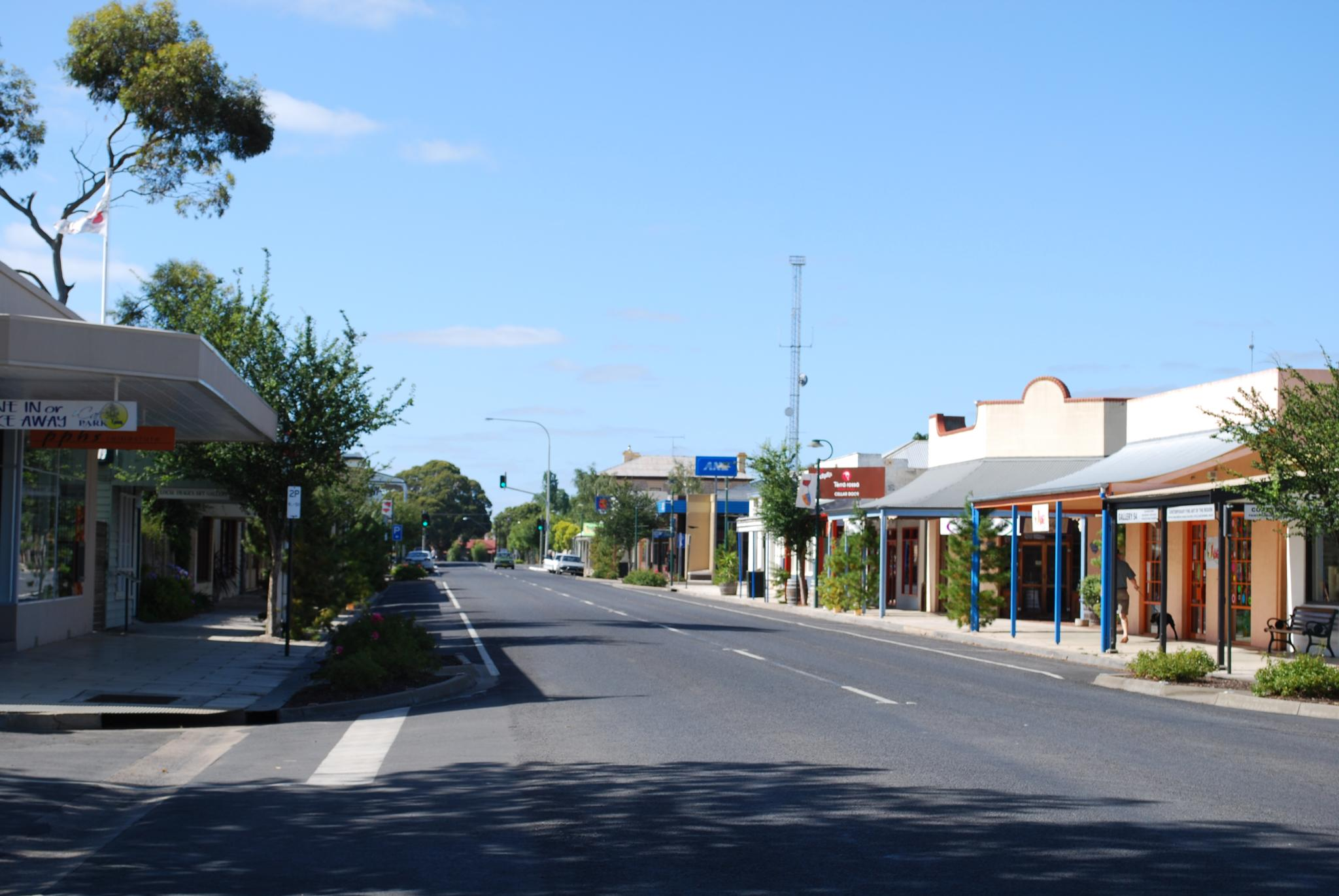
- Penola town centre

- Coordinates: 37°22′43″S 140°50′10″E
- Country: Australia
- State: South Australia
- Region: Limestone Coast
- LGA: Wattle Range Council
- Location: 388 km (241 mi) SE of Adelaide
- Established: 1867 (town); 13 December 2001 (locality)

Government
  - State electorate: Mackillop
  - Federal division: Barker
- Elevation: 65 m (213 ft)

Population
  - Totals: 1,376 (town centre) (2021 census); 1,622 (locality) (2021 census)
- Time zone: UTC+9:30 (ACST)
  - Summer (DST): UTC+10:30 (ACST)
- Postcode: 5277
- County: Grey
- Mean max temp: 20.0 °C (68.0 °F)
- Mean min temp: 8.3 °C (46.9 °F)
- Annual rainfall: 708.5 mm (27.89 in)
Localities around Penola
Maaoupe	Coonawarra	Dorodong
Monbulla	Penola	Dorodong; Lake Mundi
Krongart	Nangwarry	Lake Mundi

Penola (/pəˈnoʊlə/ pə-NOH-lə) is a town in the Australian state of South Australia located about 388 kilometres (241 mi) southeast of the state capital of Adelaide in the wine growing area known as the Coonawarra. At the 2021 Australian Census, the town of Penola had a population of 1,376.

It is known as the central location in the life of Mary MacKillop (St Mary of the Cross), the first Australian to gain Roman Catholic sainthood, in 2010. In 1866 MacKillop and a Catholic priest and geologist, Julian Tenison-Woods, established a Catholic school in the town. The Italianate villa in which much of the 2026 TV series My Brilliant Career was filmed is in Penola.

== History ==
The Aboriginal Australians living in the area when Europeans arrived were the Bindjali people, although this meaning has also been ascribed to Coonawarra by the same source. A different source reports that the Bindjali expression, pena oorla means "wooden house", which referred to the first pub in the district, the Royal Oak.

The first Europeans to the area were the Austin brothers, who arrived in 1840 and established a run of 109 square miles (280 km^{2}). The first settlers were Scottish-born Alexander Cameron and his wife Margaret in January 1844 after obtaining an occupation licence. In April 1850, Cameron obtained 80 acres (0.3 km^{2}) of freehold land (his station was on a pastoral lease) and established the private town of "Panoola", later known as Penola.

By 1850, he had built the Royal Oak Hotel and was doing much business supplying liquor to the many travellers passing through to the Victoria goldfields.

Penola Post Office opened around 1852.

Religious services in the town were first conducted in a converted shop, before St Joseph's (Catholic) Church was built in 1859. This was replaced on the same site by a new one designed by Adelaide architect Herbert Jory in Romanesque Revival style and opened in 1924.

John Riddoch purchased Yallum in 1861. Riddoch grew up in poverty in the highlands of Scotland and in 1851 emigrated to try his luck on the Victoria goldfields. Within a few years he was a successful shopkeeper and wine merchant on the Geelong goldfields. He acquired 35,000 acres (142 km^{2}) on which he ran 50,000 head of sheep. It was Riddoch who planted the first grape vines and helped to diversify the pastoral economy of the area with an agricultural industry. In 1890, he established the Penola Fruit Growing Colony which was renamed Coonawarra in 1897.

=== Mary MacKillop ===
Mary MacKillop was a Roman Catholic nun, who was beatified on 19 January 1995 at Randwick Racecourse, Sydney, in a Mass celebrated by Pope John Paul II; and became the first Australian to be named as a saint in 2010. In 1866 MacKillop and Julian Tenison Woods established a Catholic school, St Joseph's School, and developed the Woods/MacKillop Catholic education system in Australia, They also established in Penola a congregation of religious sisters, the Sisters of St Joseph of the Sacred Heart. Also known as the "Josephites" or "Brown Joeys", they continue to work with the poor and needy communities throughout the world today.

=== Railways ===
Penola was on the Mount Gambier to Wolseley railway line, which opened in 1887, until its closure to freight on 12 April 1995 and then to Limestone Coast Railway tourist passengers on 1 July 2006.

== Heritage listings ==
Penola has a number of heritage-listed sites, including:

- 31 Arthur Street: St Andrew's Presbyterian Church
- 23 Arthur Street: Penola Public Library and Mechanics Institute
- Bowden Street: Ulva Cottage
- Church Street: National Bank Building
- 28 Church Street: Bank of South Australia Building
- 31 Church Street: Heyward's Royal Oak Hotel
- 31 Church Street: Penola Post Office and Dwelling
- 118 Church Street: Bushman's Inn
- Clarke Street: Penola railway station
- off Penola Road: John Shaw Neilson's Cottage
- Portland Street: Woods MacKillop Schoolhouse
- 58 Riddoch Street: Penola Butter and Cheese Factory
- 136 Wilson Street (Petticoat Lane): Sharam's First Cottage
- 136 Wilson Street (Petticoat Lane): Sharam's Second Cottage

== Attractions ==
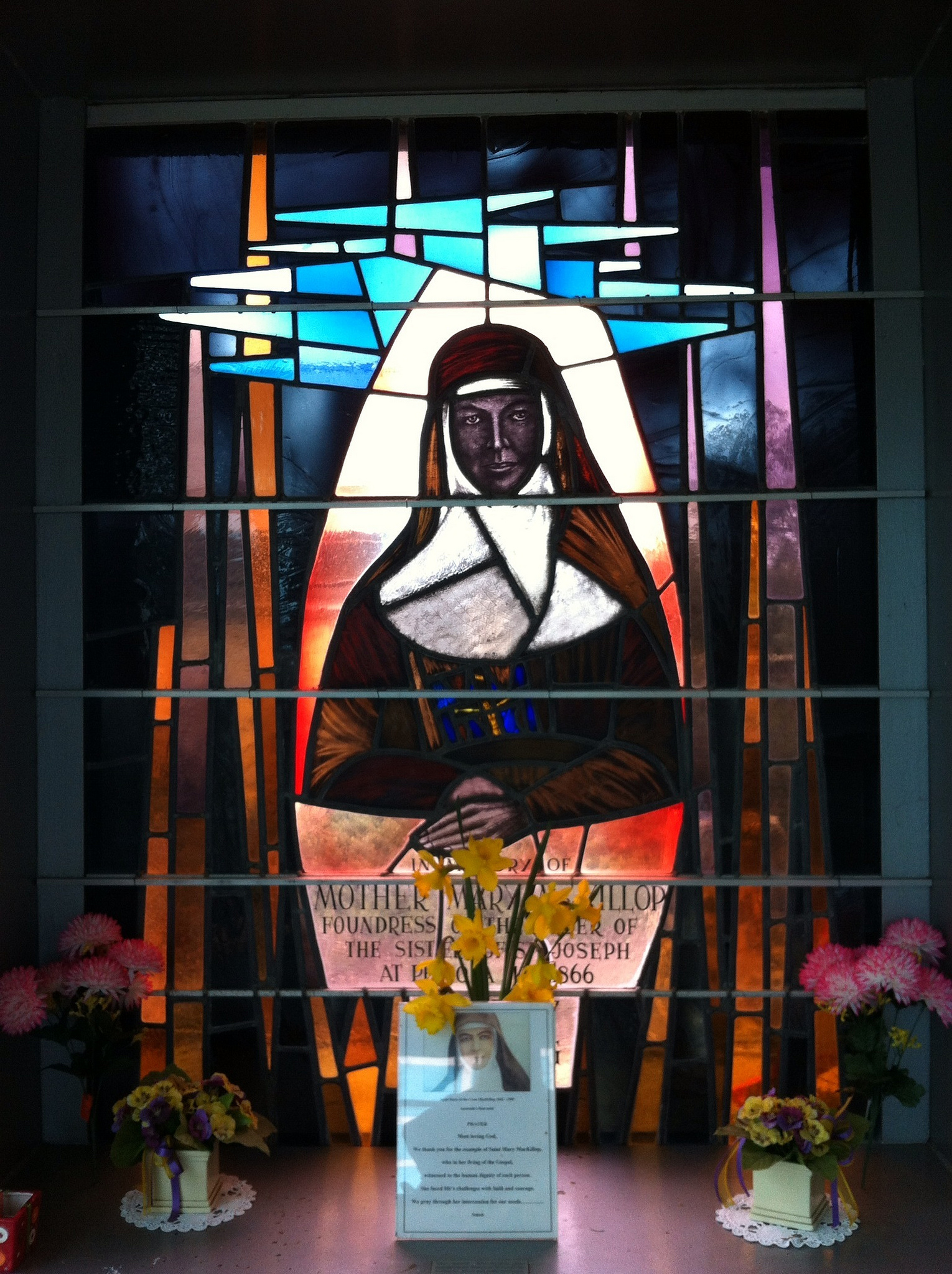
Stained glass window at Mary MacKillop shrine, Penola South Australia

The Mary MacKillop Interpretive Centre is located in Penola. It is in close proximity to the two State Heritage sites of Petticoat Lane and the original stone schoolhouse developed by Mary MacKillop in conjunction with Father Julian Tenison Woods in the 1800s.

The 2026 TV series My Brilliant Career was largely filmed around Penola, and has brought renewed interest in the area. The grand home in which the main character Sybylla's grandmother lives, called "Caddagat", was filmed on a property at Penola called Yallum Park. Yallum Park, an Italianate mansion, was built on a 40-acre (16 ha) property purchased in 1861 by Scottish settler pastoralist John Riddoch (1827–1901) for £30,000. He hosted many notable people at his home, including English novelist Anthony Trollope. The home has 17 rooms, and is elaborately decorated and well-preserved. At the time of filming the series, it is owned by Andy and Annie Clifford; Andy's grandfather having bought the home from the Riddoch estate in 1914. The home is opened to visitors once a month.

== Governance and demographics ==
Penola is located within the federal division of Barker, the state electoral district of MacKillop, and the local government area of the Wattle Range Council.

At the 2021 Australian Census, the town of Penola had a population of 1,376.

== Sport ==
The town has an Australian Rules football team competing in the Kowree-Naracoorte-Tatiara Football League, the Penola Eagles.

The Penola Racing Club holds thoroughbred horse racing at its track located near the town.

The town also has a cricket team that competes in the Mount Gambier & District Cricket Association with both a junior and senior team.

== Media ==
The primary local newspaper of the district is The Pennant, published weekly since July 1946, while The Border Watch (also part of the Scott Group of Companies) and rival The Naracoorte Herald, also publish local and regional news.

== Climate ==
In 2010, a strong tornado ripped through the township destroying at least four buildings and damaging many more.

Climate data for Penola State Forest Reserve, Nangwarry, South Australia
Month	Jan	Feb	Mar	Apr	May	Jun	Jul	Aug	Sep	Oct	Nov	Dec	Year
Record high °C (°F)	44.0 (111.2)	44.1 (111.4)	41.3 (106.3)	34.6 (94.3)	28.5 (83.3)	20.4 (68.7)	22.0 (71.6)	24.5 (76.1)	31.2 (88.2)	33.6 (92.5)	39.5 (103.1)	42.9 (109.2)	44.1 (111.4)
Mean daily maximum °C (°F)	26.3 (79.3)	27.3 (81.1)	24.5 (76.1)	21.0 (69.8)	17.0 (62.6)	14.0 (57.2)	13.6 (56.5)	14.7 (58.5)	16.6 (61.9)	19.2 (66.6)	21.8 (71.2)	24.5 (76.1)	20.0 (68.0)
Mean daily minimum °C (°F)	11.8 (53.2)	12.0 (53.6)	11.2 (52.2)	9.0 (48.2)	7.2 (45.0)	5.2 (41.4)	4.5 (40.1)	5.2 (41.4)	6.5 (43.7)	7.4 (45.3)	9.0 (48.2)	10.7 (51.3)	8.3 (46.9)
Record low °C (°F)	3.0 (37.4)	2.3 (36.1)	2.8 (37.0)	0.0 (32.0)	−0.5 (31.1)	−2.2 (28.0)	−3.2 (26.2)	−1.0 (30.2)	−0.4 (31.3)	0.1 (32.2)	0.2 (32.4)	1.3 (34.3)	−3.2 (26.2)
Average rainfall mm (inches)	25.2 (0.99)	20.8 (0.82)	33.2 (1.31)	52.9 (2.08)	71.2 (2.80)	81.6 (3.21)	101.9 (4.01)	91.7 (3.61)	76.6 (3.02)	61.0 (2.40)	46.3 (1.82)	40.2 (1.58)	702.6 (27.65)
Average rainy days (≥ 0.2mm)	7.5	6.0	8.6	11.9	15.7	16.3	18.7	19.6	16.6	13.7	11.6	10.8	157
Source: Bureau of Meteorology

== Notable people ==
Penola has been home to some notable and interesting people. Among them were Saint Mary MacKillop, poets John Shaw Neilson and Adam Lindsay Gordon, Julian Tenison-Woods, Scottish-Australian bush poet Will H. Ogilvie (1869–1963), Sara Douglass, Michael Graham (footballer) and John Riddoch.

It was The Border Watch that published Ogilvie's first poem in Australia on 22 April 1893, when he was at nearby Maaoupe Station.

The Antarctic explorer John Riddoch Rymill was born in Penola, named his ship Penola and later successfully farmed the Old Penola Estate.
