= The Pennant =

The Pennant is a weekly newspaper published in Penola, South Australia, from July 1946. Along with The Border Watch, it was most recently owned by the Scott Group of Companies. After 74 years of publishing, however, the newspaper (along with sister publication the South Eastern Times) was discontinued on 21 August 2020. However, in March 2022 the newspaper was relaunched with funding after an 18-month hiatus.

== History ==
The Pennant was founded by W. Erwin Thiele, who felt that a publication to service the town and local areas was needed after a "lack of communication from Mount Gambier and Naracoorte was evident". It was first published on Thursday, 25 July 1946, leading with a story about plans to upgrade Penola's Memorial Hospital.

Kenneth Victor Dohnt (a New Zealander), assumed control of the paper in 1950 and maintained it until his death in 1971. It was then controlled by Lyle Shurdington, a local and long-time employee, and in October 1978, it was taken over by South East Telecasters, whose major shareholder was Allan Scott, of the Scott Group of Companies.

Under the supervision of The Border Watch, it was published every Wednesday and its head office (for local advertising and editorial content) was at 81 Commercial Street East, Mount Gambier. The newspaper ceased publication for 18 months in 2020-2022 due to financial difficulties but was successfully relaunched.

== Distribution ==
The newspaper advertised itself as "Circulating extensively throughout the Penola District Council Area, embracing Kalangadoo, Coonawarra, Nangwarry, Comaum, Glenroy, Monbulla and Maaoupe; and the South-East generally." At the time of its 2020 closure, it had a circulation of 1,000.

== Digitisation ==
Microfilm of The Pennant have been created by the State Library of South Australia. Australian National Library also carries images and text versions of the newspaper from July 1946 to December 1955, accessible using Trove, the on-line newspaper retrieval service.
