= William Hutchison (pastoralist) =

Horse breeder and pastoralist (1841–1914)

William Hutchison (1841 – 15 August 1914), born near Moonee Ponds, Colony of New South Wales, was a horse breeder and pastoralist in the South East of South Australia, remembered for his successful libel suit against the proprietors and editor of The Narracoorte Herald.

His father John Hutchison ( – 1843) of Leith, Scotland arrived in Melbourne, Colony of New South Wales in December 1839, by the ship St. Mungo, and took up land there for a cattle station. His father died and his mother (née McKenzie) married Andrew Dunn (1819 – 12 December 1901) and moved to Dunnoo Dunnoo near Edenhop, Colony of New South Wales. After a dispute with neighbors regarding the legality of the land they were occupying, they moved in 1848 to Barooka, near Kingston SE in South Australia. Around 1850 they moved to Woolmit, previously known as Biscuit Flat, 20 miles (32 km) from Robe. William was educated at John Whinham's North Adelaide Grammar School. In 1862 Hutchison and Dunn purchased Murra Binna station from "Tommy" Woods, and ran that property, where he was a successful racehorse breeder and Adam Lindsay Gordon was a frequent visitor. In 1876 they purchased Morambro station of 127,000 acres (51,000 ha) from the Oliver brothers. Hutchison acquired considerable additional property by the illegal process known as "dummying", using third parties who owned no property to "select" Government land secretly on his behalf. George Ash, of The Narracoorte Herald in an editorial questioned his fitness to hold the position of justice of the peace, and was successfully (and ruinously) sued by Hutchison, whose lawyer, Josiah Symon, QC conducted a masterfully technical case against Ash, which rendered practically all his evidence, including Crown Law documents and Hansard inadmissible.

Hutchison, who was badly affected by the Depression of the early 1890s, left Morambro for Victoria around 1895, settled in Gippsland, and died in Malvern.

== Family ==
Hutchison married Harriett Reid (c. 1840 – 21 September 1880) on 10 May 1864. Harriett was a sister of the Rev. Richardson Reid, of Trinity Church, Adelaide. They had five sons:

- William John Reid Hutchison (9 April 1873 – ) married Annie Elizabeth Cooke ( – ) on 28 April 1896, lived at Magill, South Australia
- J. R. Hutchison, of Padthaway, South Australia
- A. R. Hutchison, of Narracoorte
- Egbert William "Bert" Hutchison ( – 14 August 1925) of Melbourne
- A. J. Hutchison of Narracoorte

He married again, to Julia Reid ( – 24 January 1916) on 6 September 1881. Julia was the widow of Inspector Reid, and had a daughter Alice Ann Reid ( – ), who married John Thomas Morris of Kalangadoo on 20 January 1887.
