= Commissionaire =

Hospitality occupation

In mainland Europe, a commissionaire is an attendant, messenger or subordinate employed in hotels, whose chief duty is to attend at railway stations, secure customers, take charge of their luggage, carry out the necessary formalities with respect to it and have it sent on to the hotel. They are also employed in Paris as street messengers, light porters, etc.

In Commonwealth countries, a commissionaire may refer to an employee of a Corps of Commissionaires who carries out security or reception duties.

== Law and taxation ==
In European civil law jurisdictions (e.g., France, Germany), a commissionaire is a person who acts in his or her own name for the account of a principal. The principal is contractually bound to deliver (through the commissionaire) the goods sold to the customer; the commissionaire is contractually bound to the principal to remit the price received to the principal. In addition, the commissionaire is contractually bound to the customer to deliver the goods sold on the terms agreed. No relationship is created between the customer and the principal. The commissionaire is remunerated by commission, and paid by the principal. The commissionaire does not take title to the goods.

A civil law commissionaire arrangement creates agency in common law countries, such as Canada, the United Kingdom, and the United States.

For tax purposes in civil law jurisdictions, a commissionaire is not generally viewed as a dependent agent by virtue of the commissionaire status. Thus, the activities and place of business of a commissionaire are not attributed to the principal. Use of a commissionaire arrangement has historically been considered to prevent a seller of goods (the principal) from having a permanent establishment in the commissionaire's country if the principal has no other presence in that country. However, this view was unsuccessfully challenged by tax authorities in France, Norway and Italy.
