= Partially disclosed principal =

Concept in law

A partially disclosed principal is one whose agent reveals that he has a principal, but does not reveal the principal's identity. This concept has important implications in liability law. It is in contrast to a disclosed principal and undisclosed principal.
