= Reuben Cranstoun Mowbray =

Australian politician

Reuben Cranstoun Mowbray (31 Aug 1883 – 12 Jul 1955) was a newspaper editor and member of the South Australian parliament.

== History ==
Born in Gippsland, Victoria, Mowbray was a reporter, then editor of the South Eastern Times from 1906 to early 1952, and its owner from 1921 onward.

He worked for a while as a solicitor in Bordertown prior to entering politics. In 1932, he was elected unopposed as a Liberal and Country League member of the South Australian Legislative Council for the Southern District, following the death in office of Sir Lancelot Stirling. He ran for re-election in 1938 but was defeated, and was unsuccessful in a bid for LCL preselection for a 1938 by-election for another Southern District seat.

Mowbray sold the newspaper to the five members of his staff in 1952.

== Family ==
He married Eda Sophia Spehr on 29 December 1909; they divorced in 1941.
