= American Society of Mechanical Engineers, Inc. v. Hydrolevel Corp. =

American Society of Mechanical Engineers v. Hydrolevel Corporation
- Supreme Court of the United States

Argued January 13, 1982 Decided May 17, 1982
- Full case name: American Society of Mechanical Engineers, Inc. v. Hydrolevel Corporation
- Citations: 456 U.S. 556 (more) 102 S. Ct. 1935; 72 L. Ed. 2d 330; 1982 U.S. LEXIS 3; 50 U.S.L.W. 4512; 1982-2 Trade Cas. (CCH) ¶ 64,730

Holding
- A non-profit association, for the first time, was held liable for treble damages under the Sherman Antitrust Act due to antitrust violations.

Court membership
- Chief Justice Warren E. Burger Associate Justices William J. Brennan Jr. · Byron White; Thurgood Marshall · Harry Blackmun; Lewis F. Powell Jr. · William Rehnquist; John P. Stevens · Sandra Day O'Connor

Case opinions
- Majority: Blackmun, joined by Brennan, Marshall, Stevens, O'Connor
- Concurrence: Burger
- Dissent: Powell, joined by White, Rehnquist

Laws applied
- Sherman Antitrust Act of 1890

American Society of Mechanical Engineers v. Hydrolevel Corporation, 456 U.S. 556 (1982), is a United States Supreme Court case where a non-profit association, for the first time, was held liable for treble damages under the Sherman Antitrust Act due to antitrust violations.

In this case, the U.S. Supreme Court held an association liable when its agents appeared to be acting under the authority of the association. Such action is called apparent authority. The court determined that a non-profit association is liable when it fails to prevent antitrust violation through the misuse of the association's reputation by its agents (including lower level staff and unpaid volunteers).

== Background ==
In 1982 the U.S. Supreme Court held that American Society of Mechanical Engineers (a nonprofit association) was responsible for treble damages under the Sherman Act. In 1971 the engineering firm of McDonnell and Miller requested an interpretation of the ASME Boiler and Pressure Vessel Code from the ASME Boiler and Pressure Vessel Codes Committee. McDonnell and Miller planned to use the response to show that one of their competitors (Hydrolevel Corp) was selling a device not in compliance with the ASME BPV Code.

Unknown to ASME's leadership the volunteer chairman of the ASME committee wrote a response to McDonnell and Miller's inquiry that was later used by a McDonnell and Miller salesmen as proof of Hydrolevel's noncompliance. Subsequently, according to Hydrolevel, it never acquired sufficient market penetration for sustaining business, and eventually went bankrupt.

Hydrolevel sued McDonnell and Miller, the Hartford Steam Boiler Inspection and Insurance Company and ASME arguing that two ASME subcommittee members acted not only in the self-interest of their companies, but also in violation of the Sherman Anti-Trust Act.

== Opinion of the Court ==
The Supreme Court concluded that the association was liable even though the ASME leadership 1) was unaware of the action the volunteer chairman took, 2) had not approved the action, 3) and did not benefit from the action. Damages and legal fees paid by ASME were more than $6 million. An appellate court affirmed that ASME was liable because its agents had acted within the scope of their apparent authority.
