= Dummy purchaser =

A dummy purchaser is an agent who buys property on behalf of another, usually to conceal the true purpose of the acquisition. For instance, a shopping mall developer may hire a dummy buyer to purchase the needed vacant lots. Disclosing the principal's identity might prompt the landowners to hold out for a higher price; hence the need for secrecy. It has been hypothesized that dummy buyers could help private sector developers obtain the land needed for highway construction without the need for eminent domain invocation. A principal in such a relationship may be a partially disclosed principal (i.e. the agent informs the seller that he is buying on behalf of someone, but does not reveal that person's identity) or a completely undisclosed principal (i.e. the agent does not reveal that he is acting on anyone's behalf). A dummy purchaser is also sometimes called a straw man.

== Dummying ==
In Australia, during periods of conversion of Government land to freehold or leasehold, the practice (also called "dummyism") of wealthy squatters employing someone who qualifies as a "free selector" to acquire land that they themselves would not have access to. This practice was particularly useful in acquiring or denying to others access to watercourses and thoroughfares.

== See also ==
- Straw man (law)
