= Undisclosed principal =

In agency law, an undisclosed principal is a person who uses an agent for negotiations with a third party who has no knowledge of the identity of the agent's principal. Often in such situations, the agent pretends to be acting for themselves. As a result, the third party does not know to look to the real principal in a dispute.

Under United States law according to the Restatement (Third) of Agency § 2.06, an undisclosed principal may still be held liable to a third party who justifiably is induced to make a detrimental change in position, even if the agent lacked actual authority to act on behalf of the principal, so long as the undisclosed principal had notice of agent's conduct and that it might induce the third party to change its position, and the principal did not take reasonable steps to notify the third party of the facts. Even where an undisclosed principal has previously forbidden the agent to take some action or incur some debt, the undisclosed principal may be liable for the action or debt so long as the third party would reasonably believe the agent would have had the authority to take the action or incur the debt under the same circumstances had the principal been disclosed, i.e. so long as the transaction is in the usual course of business engaged in by the agent.

== Walt Disney World ==
The undisclosed principal concept often arises in the context of real estate transactions, where a buyer risks a seller being less inclined to sell land, risks a seller demanding a higher price, or risks a seller becoming a holdout if the seller knows or can guess the identity of the buyer or the buyer's intended purpose for the land which would afford the land a higher value. The purchase of the land required to build the Walt Disney World resort in Orange County, Florida was accomplished with agents working for Walt Disney Productions as their undisclosed principal. Over eighteen months in 1964 and 1965, agents secretly working for Disney attorneys purchased 27,400 acres of Florida ranchland, swamp, scrub woods and road frontage for an average price of only R5.20 per acre ($5 million total). It is unlikely that Disney would have been able to acquire the land except at prohibitively high prices of hundreds of thousands of dollars per acre had the sellers known their buyer's identity, given the prices at which nearby land sold after Disney completed its acquisitions and publicly announced its plan. (The project could also have been delayed for years or decades as owners of crucial pieces of land held out for higher offers.)

== See also ==
- Watteau v Fenwick
