= The Border Watch =

Newspaper in South Australia

- The cover of The Border Watch (c. 2012)
- Type: Newspaper
- Format: Tabloid
- Owner: TBW Today Pty Ltd
- Founder: A F Laurie
- News editor: Elisabeth Champion
- Founded: April 26, 1861; 164 years ago
- Language: English
- Headquarters: Level 1, 1 Commercial Street East; Mount Gambier, South Australia
- City: Mount Gambier
- Country: Australia
- ISSN: 1329-5195
- Website: borderwatch.com.au

The Border Watch is an Australian newspaper based in Mount Gambier, South Australia, as of October 2020 owned by TBW Today Pty Ltd. The paper services Mount Gambier, the South Australian Limestone Coast, and parts of Western Victoria. It is the oldest and largest regional newspaper in South Australia. After 159 years of publishing the newspaper (along with sister publications The Pennant and the South Eastern Times) was briefly discontinued on 21 August 2020. However, The Border Watch resumed operation, under a consortium of new publishing owners, in an initial weekly format on 16 October 2020.

== History ==
The Border Watch was first published on 26 April 1861 by proprietor and editor Andrew Frederick Laurie (1843–1920), aided by his brother Park Laurie (1846–1928) and their mother, the widow of the Rev. Alexander Laurie, first Presbyterian minister of nearby Portland, Victoria. It started as a 4-page, single broadsheet weekly in Gambierton, as Mount Gambier township was then known. John Watson (ca.1842 – 13 December 1925) joined in 1863 as editor, and he and A. F. Laurie as publisher managed the company for the next 50 years. Laurie was president of the Mount Gambier Racing Club from its inception and Watson was Mount Gambier's first mayor. Laurie and Watson founded The Narracoorte Herald in 1875, run initially by Archibald Caldwell and John Baxter Mather, and taken over in 1880 by Mather and George Ash.

The newspaper went on to incorporate two rivals: the biweekly Mount Gambier Standard (3 May 1866 – 1874), and the South Eastern Star (2 October 1877 – 13 October 1930), which had been run by James Fletcher Jones. It also owned and printed the weekly newspaper The Pennant, which services Penola and district, and the South Eastern Times at Millicent.

The newspaper was eventually bought by transport businessman, Alan Scott in 1977. In 2006, prominent editorial staff resigned or took leave due to the perceived interference of the newspaper's owner. Scott died in 2008 and the business remained in the family as part of The Border Watch Media Group (which also controlled The Pennant and the South Eastern Times). On 21 August 2020, as a result of losses due to the pandemic, all three newspapers were discontinued with the loss of 38 jobs.

However, a revitalised The Border Watch later announced on 24 September that it would return to print, initially in a weekly format, from 16 October 2020. The new owner, TBW Today Pty Ltd, represents a partnership of independent newspaper owners from South Australia (i.e. Andrew Manuel of the Plains Producer), Victoria, and a Queensland media consultant.

On 26 April 2021, The Border Watch celebrated its 160th anniversary.

On 26 April 2026, The Border Watch celebrated its 165th anniversary.

== Awards ==
It won the "Best Newspaper" category in the South Australian Country Press Awards in 2004, 2010, 2011, 2012, 2013 and 2018, as well as 2021.
