= The Naracoorte Herald =

Limestone Coast Today
- Type: Weekly newspaper
- Owner: Star News Group
- Founder(s): Andrew F. Laurie and John Watson
- Founded: 1875
- Language: English
- City: Naracoorte, South Australia
- Website: limestonecoasttoday.com.au

Limestone Coast Today (previously The Naracoorte Herald) is a weekly newspaper first published in Naracoorte, South Australia on 14 December 1875. It was later sold to Rural Press, previously owned by Fairfax Media. After closing due to the impact of Covid, it became part of Australian Community Media, then the Star News Group. In 2023, it was renamed to the broader regional title of Limestone Coast Today.

== History ==
The Narracoorte Herald was founded in 1875 by Andrew F. Laurie (1843–1920) and John Watson (c. 1842–1925) as an offshoot of their Border Watch and run by John B. Mather and Archibald Caldwell (1855–1942), who had learned the trade at the Border Watch. Caldwell left soon after, and the paper was purchased by Mather and George Ash and they ran the business until 1889. In that year Mather and Ash were successfully sued by William Hutchison, J.P., for a libel accusing the wealthy squatter of dummying, and giving the opinion that Justices of the Peace should be free of such taint. Considerable sympathy was felt by the farming community for Ash and Mather, and they had a legislative council champion in A. M. Simpson, but after a Supreme Court trial under Justice Boucaut lasting ten days, Hutchison was vindicated, and Mather and Ash lost all they had. The paper was forced to close at the end of August 1889; publishing resumed with the issue of 25 October after Archibald returned to purchase the business, and with his brother Dugald Caldwell ran it until his death. Dugald then took over the business, assisted by his niece Jean Anderson.

In 1912, a nearby publication, the Tatiara and Lawloit News (13 June 1908 – 15 June 1912), which also printed in Naracoorte, was absorbed.

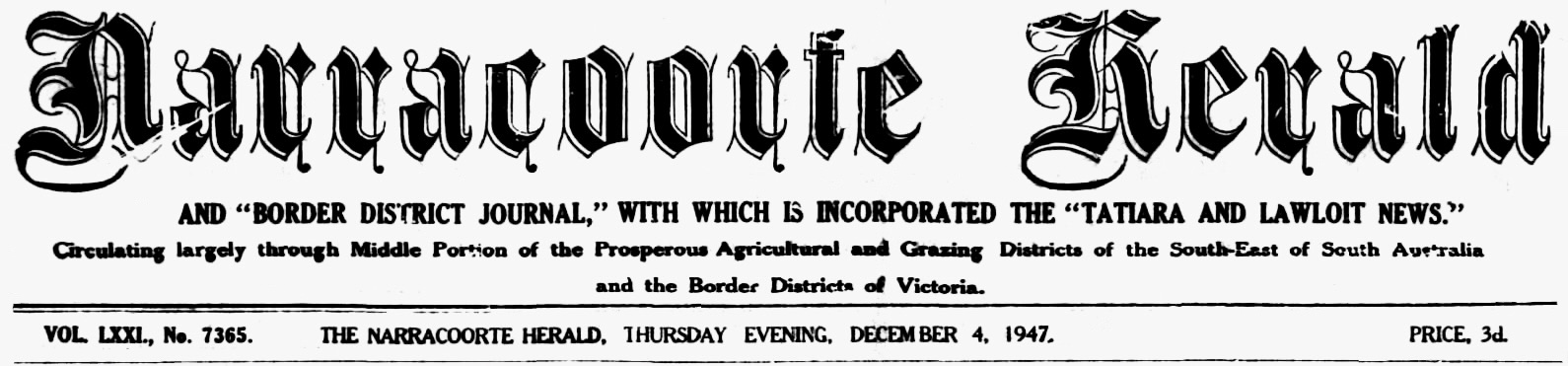
The town's newspaper retained the original spelling, "Narracoorte", until well after the name had officially changed

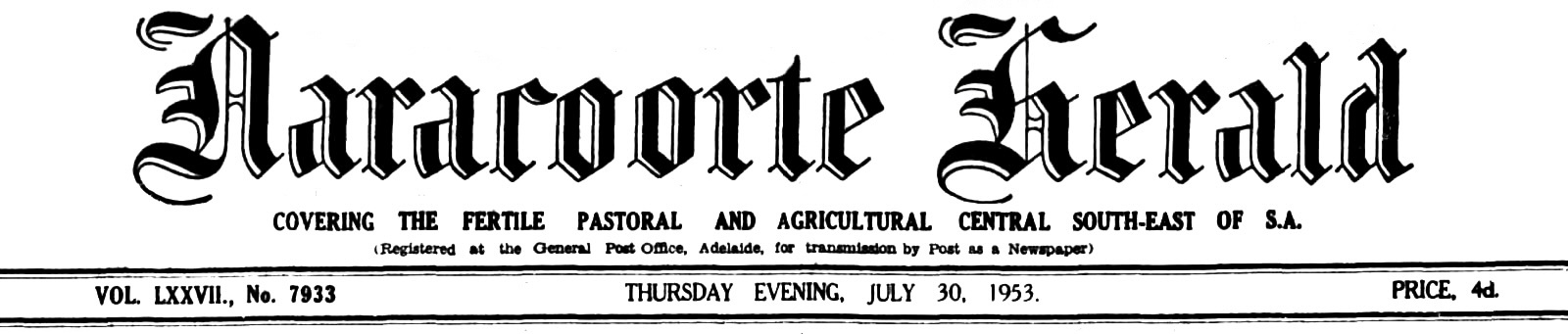
The masthead of the Naracoorte Herald in 1953

In 1948, Dugald sold the business to James L. Thomson, a long-serving employee, and along with a new owner came an updated name, The Naracoorte Herald. The Post Office, Railways, and other government departments had standardised the town's spelling to "Naracoorte" before 1896, but like the editor of the Narandera Argus, Archibald Caldwell doggedly stuck to the original orthography. In another modernisation, and given the evolution of the media in the post-war era, a collaboration began between the Herald, Mount Gambier's Border Watch and Bordertown's Border Chronicle. Harry and Margaret Peake bought the paper in 1958 and their son Richard Peake and his wife Judith Barton took over in 1979.

It was owned by Fairfax Regional Media from October 2010 to 2019. The Naracoorte Herald temporarily ceased operations in March 2020 and, under the new management of Australian Community Media, resumed printing in July 2020. In May 2020, a rival weekly publication, The Naracoorte Community News (stylised simply as The News), began printing while the Herald was suspended. In December 2022, management of the newspaper was taken over by Star News Group along with 13 other ACM titles in Queensland and South Australia. Starting with the 19 October 2023 issue, the publication was renamed to Limestone Coast Today.

== Distribution ==
The newspaper serves the regions around the towns of Lucindale, Penola, Padthaway and Frances. Like other Rural Press publications, the newspaper is also available online.

== Digitisation ==
Australian National Library's carries images and text versions of the newspaper from 1875 to 1954, accessible using Trove, the on-line newspaper retrieval service.
