= Hely-Hutchinson v Brayhead Ltd =

1968 UK company law case

- Court: Court of Appeal of England and Wales
- Citation: [1968] 1 QB 549

Keywords
- Actual authority, apparent authority

Hely-Hutchinson v Brayhead Ltd [1968] 1 QB 549 is a UK company law case concerning the authority of agents to act for a company.

== Facts ==
Lord Suirdale (Richard Michael John Hely-Hutchinson) sued Brayhead Ltd for losses incurred after a failed takeover deal. The CEO, chairman and de facto managing director of Brayhead Ltd, Mr Richards, had guaranteed repayment of money, and had indemnified losses of Lord Suirdale in return for injection of money into Lord Suirdale's company Perdio Electronics Ltd. Perdio Ltd was then taken over by Brayhead Ltd and Lord Suirdale gained a place on Brayhead Ltd's board, but Perdio Ltd's business did not recover. It went into liquidation, Lord Suirdale resigned from Brayhead Ltd's board and sued for the losses he had incurred. Brayhead Ltd refused to pay on the basis that Mr Richards had no authority to make the guarantee and indemnity contract in the first place.

Roskill J held Mr Richards had apparent authority to bind Brayhead Ltd, and the company appealed.

== Judgment ==
Lord Denning MR held that he did have authority, but it was actual authority because (like a "course of dealing" in contract law) the fact that the board had let Mr Richards continue to act had in fact created actual authority. .

I need not consider at length the law on the authority of an agent, actual, apparent, or ostensible. That has been done in the judgments of this court in Freeman & Lockyer v Buckhurst Park Properties (Mangal) Ltd. It is there shown that actual authority may be express or implied. It is express when it is given by express words, such as when a board of directors pass a resolution which authorises two of their number to sign cheques. It is implied when it is inferred from the conduct of the parties and the circumstances of the case, such as when the board of directors appoint one of their number to be managing director. They thereby impliedly authorise him to do all such things as fall within the usual scope of that office. Actual authority, express or implied, is binding as between the company and the agent, and also as between the company and others, whether they are within the company or outside it.

Ostensible or apparent authority is the authority of an agent as it appears to others. It often coincides with actual authority. Thus, when the board appoint one of their number to be managing director, they invest him not only with implied authority, but also with ostensible authority to do all such things as fall within the usual scope of that office. Other people who see him acting as managing director are entitled to assume that he has the usual authority of a managing director. But sometimes ostensible authority exceeds actual authority. For instance, when the board appoint the managing director, they may expressly limit his authority by saying he is not to order goods worth more than £500 without the sanction of the board. In that case his actual authority is subject to the £500 limitation, but his ostensible authority includes all the usual authority of a managing director. The company is bound by his ostensible authority in his dealings with those who do not know of the limitation. He may himself do the "holding-out." Thus, if he orders goods worth £1,000 and signs himself "Managing Director for and on behalf of the company," the company is bound to the other party who does not know of the £500 limitation, see British Thomson-Houston Co Ltd v Federated European Bank Ltd., which was quoted for this purpose by Pearson L.J. in Freeman & Lockyer. Even if the other party happens himself to be a director of the company, nevertheless the company may be bound by the ostensible authority. Suppose the managing director orders £1,000 worth of goods from a new director who has just joined the company and does not know of the £500 limitation, not having studied the minute book, the company may yet be bound. Lord Simonds in Morris v Kanssen, envisaged that sort of case, which was considered by Roskill J. in the present case.

Apply these principles here. It is plain that Mr. Richards had no express authority to enter into these two contracts on behalf of the company: nor had he any such authority implied from the nature of his office. He had been duly appointed chairman of the company but that office in itself did not carry with it authority to enter into these contracts without the sanction of the board. But I think he had authority implied from the conduct of the parties and the circumstances of the case. The judge did not rest his decision on implied authority, but I think his findings necessarily carry that consequence. The judge finds that Mr. Richards acted as de facto managing director of Brayhead. He was the chief executive who made the final decision on any matter concerning finance. He often committed Brayhead to contracts without the knowledge of the board and reported the matter afterwards. The judge [Roskill J] said:

"I have no doubt that Mr. Richards was, by virtue of his position as de facto managing director of Brayhead or, as perhaps one might more compendiously put it, as Brayhead's chief executive, the man who had, in Diplock L.J.'s words, 'actual authority to manage,' and he was acting as such when he signed those two documents."

and later he said:

"the board of Brayhead knew of and acquiesced in Mr. Richards acting as de facto managing director of Brayhead."

The judge held that Mr. Richards had ostensible or apparent authority to make the contract, but I think his findings carry with it the necessary inference that he had also actual authority, such authority being implied from the circumstance that the board by their conduct over many months had acquiesced in his acting as their chief executive and committing Brayhead Ltd to contracts without the necessity of sanction from the board.

Lord Pearson and Lord Wilberforce concurred.
