= John Baxter Mather =

Scottish born journalist, newspaper proprietor, landscape painter and art critic

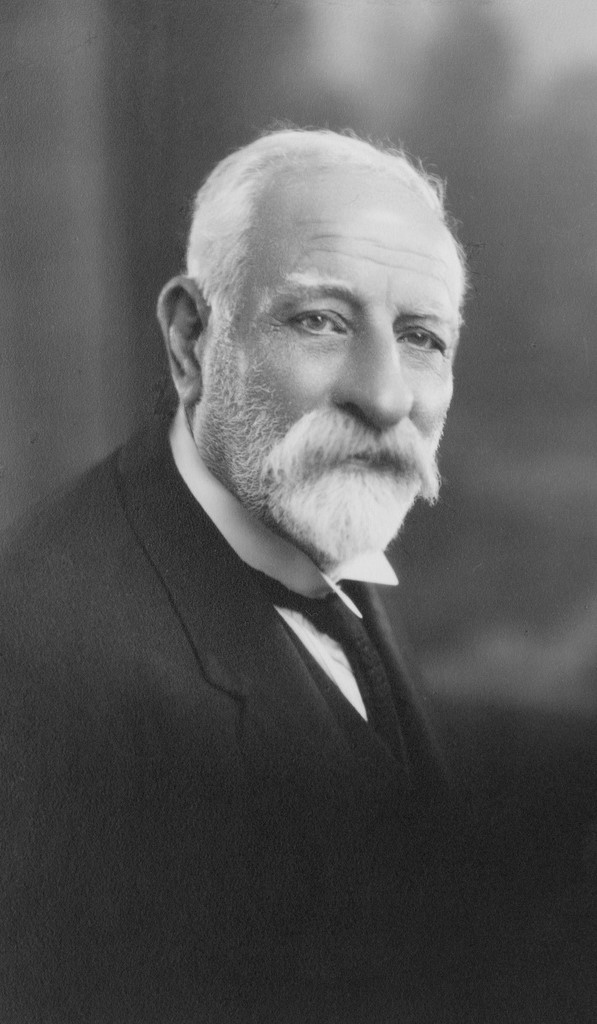
- Born: 5 March 1853; Edinburgh
- Died: 7 November 1940 (aged 87); Prospect
- Occupation: Painter

John Baxter Mather (5 March 1853 – 7 November 1940) was a Scottish born journalist, newspaper proprietor, landscape painter and art critic in South Australia.

== History ==
Mather was born in Edinburgh, Scotland to Thomas S. Mather (c. 1824 – 20 June 1865) and Jessie Mather (c. 1826 – 20 October 1901), and emigrated with his parents to Australia around 1860, settling first in Portland, Victoria. Around 1864 they moved to Mount Gambier, South Australia, where after completing his schooling he started working as a compositor for A. F. Laurie and John Watson's Border Watch. In 1874 he left Mount Gambier for a time to work as compositor for Lawrie and Fairfax at the Portland Guardian where J. F. Archibald was an apprentice. After some initial sparring, the two became friends.

In 1875, he started work at Naracoorte, South Australia for the Border Watch, running its daughter publication, the Narracoorte Herald, which shortly afterwards he and George Ash acquired. In 1889 they were sued for libel by a wealthy squatter and lost everything they had. A great deal of sympathy was evinced locally for the pair.

He moved to Adelaide and found employment with The Advertiser as a compositor, then joined their literary staff as an art critic, a post he filled for fifteen years. From 1893 to 1899, he contributed drawings to the Adelaide Express, using the chalk plate method, at which he was particularly adept.

He was at the forefront of process engraving technology; the first in South Australia to do colored monotypes. In 1900 he and Joseph Hanka founded Mather & Hanka's Excelsior Engraving Company of 4 Franklin Street, Adelaide, etching chalk plates (a fore-runner of the process plate) then making half-tone plates for printers, including The Advertiser. A year later the company was run by Mather and George Mackie By November 1903 the company was known simply as J. B. Mather, Photo-engraver, and ceased operation in late 1910. In 1913 he was employed by the Art Gallery of South Australia, revising the catalogue which H. P. Gill completed in 1903.

== Other interests ==
He enjoyed writing humorous verse, and contributed occasionally to The Advertiser, and frequently to the magazine Quiz and its successor Quiz and The Lantern. A few are listed here:

- Township v. City Life
- The Decayed Township
- The Old woman (Turgenieff done into Verse)

His published books include:

- Out of the Depths: based on passages in "De Profundis", Advertiser printers 1908.
- In Memoriam J. M., Hassell Press, Adelaide 1927
- Heine's North Sea, Advertiser printers, illustrated, 1933
- A Metrical Version of Ivan Turgenieff's Poems in Prose, Advertiser printers, illustrated, 1934
- My Queen Elect and other Verses Advertiser printers, 1937
- The Voyagers and other Verses, Advertiser printers, 1938

He was also a landscape painter of some distinction, in watercolors, and a member of the Adelaide Easel Club. He was elected an associate of the South Australian Society of Arts.

== Family ==
He had two brothers: Alexander Henderson Mather (c. 1861 – 13 June 1942) of Mount Gambier, and George R. J. Mather of Naracoorte. A sister, Margaret married Omar Arthur of Mount Gambier on 17 November 1875. Another sister married J. J. Driscoll of Mount Gambier.

He married Johanna Fraser (c. 1853 – 26 June 1921) in 1880; they lived at 38 Myrtle Street, Prospect, where he died.
