= Law of agency =

Person representing another person in legal matters, and the laws enabling this

The law of agency is an area of commercial law dealing with a set of contractual, quasi-contractual and non-contractual fiduciary relationships that involve a person, called the agent, who is authorized to act on behalf of another (called the principal) to create legal relations with a third party. It may be referred to as the equal relationship between a principal and an agent whereby the principal, expressly or implicitly, authorizes the agent to work under their control and on their behalf. The agent is, thus, required to negotiate on behalf of the principal or bring them and third parties into a contractual relationship. This branch of law separates and regulates the relationships between:

- agents and principals (internal relationship), known as the principal-agent relationship;
- agents and the third parties with whom they deal on their principals' behalf (external relationship); and
- principals and the third parties when the agents deal.

== Concepts ==
The reciprocal rights and liabilities between a principal and an agent reflect commercial and legal realities. A business owner often relies on an employee or another person to conduct a business. In the case of a corporation, since a corporation can only act through natural person agents, the principal is bound by the contract entered into by the agent, so long as the agent performs within the scope of the agency.

A third party may rely in good faith on the representation by a person who identifies himself as an agent for another. It is not always cost effective to check whether someone who is represented as having the authority to act for another actually has such authority. If it is subsequently found that the alleged agent was acting without necessary authority, the agent will generally be held liable.

== Scope of agency ==
The role of an agent and scope of their authority affect how the agent is described. For example,

1. Universal agents are authorized to perform all lawful acts that the principal could personally perform.
2. General agents are authorized to transact all of the principal's business in a particular place or of a particular kind, for example, as a partner in business; and
3. Special agents are authorized to perform either a specific transaction or task.

== Authority ==
An agent who acts within the scope of authority conferred by their principal binds the principal in the obligations they create against third parties. There are essentially three kinds of authority recognized in the law: actual authority (whether express or implied), apparent authority, and ratified authority.

=== Actual authority ===
Actual authority can be of two kinds. Either the principal may have expressly conferred authority on the agent, or authority may be implied. Authority arises by consensual agreement, and whether it exists is a question of fact. An agent, as a general rule, is only entitled to indemnity from the principal if they have acted within the scope of their actual authority, and if they act outside of that authority they may be in breach of contract, and liable to a third party for breach of the implied warranty of authority.

==== Express actual authority ====
Express actual authority means an agent has been expressly told they may act on behalf of a principal.

==== Implied actual authority ====
Implied actual authority, also called "usual authority", is authority an agent has by virtue of being reasonably necessary to carry out his express authority. As such, it can be inferred by virtue of a position held by an agent. For example, partners have authority to bind the other partners in the firm, their liability being joint and several, and in a corporation, all executives and senior employees with decision-making authority by virtue of their position have authority to bind the corporation. Other forms of implied actual authority include customary authority. This is where customs of a trade imply the agent to have certain powers. In wool buying industries it is customary for traders to purchase in their own names. Also incidental authority, where an agent is supposed to have any authority to complete other tasks which are necessary and incidental to completing the express actual authority. This must be no more than necessary

=== Apparent authority ===
Apparent authority (also called "ostensible authority") exists where the principal's words or conduct would lead a reasonable person in the third party's position to believe that the agent was authorized to act, even if the principal and the purported agent had never discussed such a relationship. For example, where one person appoints a person to a position which carries with it agency-like powers, those who know of the appointment are entitled to assume that there is apparent authority to do the things ordinarily entrusted to one occupying such a position. If a principal creates the impression that an agent is authorized but there is no actual authority, third parties are protected so long as they have acted reasonably. This is sometimes termed "agency by estoppel" or the "doctrine of holding out", where the principal will be estopped from denying the grant of authority if third parties have changed their positions to their detriment in reliance on the representations made.

- Rama Corporation Ltd v Proved Tin and General Investments Ltd [1952] 2 QB 147, Slade J, "Ostensible or apparent authority... is merely a form of estoppel, indeed, it has been termed agency by estoppel and you cannot call in aid an estoppel unless you have three ingredients: (i) a representation, (ii) reliance on the representation, and (iii) an alteration of your position resulting from such reliance."

==== Watteau v Fenwick in the UK ====
In the case of Watteau v Fenwick, Lord Coleridge CJ on the Queen's Bench concurred with an opinion by Wills J that a third party could hold personally liable a principal who he did not know about when he sold cigars to an agent that was acting outside of its authority. Wills J held that "the principal is liable for all the acts of the agent which are within the authority usually confided to an agent of that character, notwithstanding limitations, as between the principal and the agent, put upon that authority." This decision is heavily criticised and doubted, though not entirely overruled in the UK. It is sometimes referred to as "usual authority" (though not in the sense used by Lord Denning MR in Hely-Hutchinson, where it is synonymous with "implied actual authority"). It has been explained as a form of apparent authority, or "inherent agency power".

Authority by virtue of a position held to deter fraud and other harms that may befall individuals dealing with agents, there is a concept of Inherent Agency power, which is power derived solely by virtue of the agency relation. For example, partners have apparent authority to bind the other partners in the firm, their liability being joint and several (see below), and in a corporation, all executives and senior employees with decision-making authority by virtue of their declared position have apparent authority to bind the corporation.

Even if the agent does act without authority, the principal may ratify the transaction and accept liability on the transactions as negotiated. This may be express or implied from the principal's behavior, e.g. if the agent has purported to act in a number of situations and the principal has knowingly acquiesced, the failure to notify all concerned of the agent's lack of authority is an implied ratification to those transactions and an implied grant of authority for future transactions of a similar nature.

== Liability ==
=== Liability of agent to third party ===
If the agent has actual or apparent authority, the agent will not be liable for acts performed within the scope of such authority, as long as the relationship of the agency and the identity of the principal have been disclosed. When the agency is undisclosed or partially disclosed, however, both the agent and the principal are liable. Where the principal is not bound because the agent has no actual or apparent authority, the purported agent is liable to the third party for breach of the implied warranty of authority.

=== Liability of agent to principal ===
If the agent has acted without actual authority, but the principal is nevertheless bound because the agent had apparent authority, the agent is liable to indemnify the principal for any resulting loss or damage.

=== Liability of principal to agent ===
If the agent has acted within the scope of the actual authority given, the principal must indemnify the agent for payments made during the course of the relationship whether the expenditure was expressly authorized or merely necessary in promoting the principal's business.

== Duties ==
An agent owes the principal a number of duties. These include:

- a duty to undertake the task or tasks specified by the terms of the agency;
- a duty to discharge his duties with care and due diligence;

An agent must not accept any new obligations that are inconsistent with the duties owed to the principal. An agent can represent the interests of more than one principal, conflicting or potentially conflicting, only after full disclosure and consent of the principal. An agent must not usurp an opportunity from the principal by taking it for himself or passing it on to a third party.

In return, the principal must make a full disclosure of all information relevant to the transactions that the agent is authorized to negotiate.

== Termination ==
The internal agency relationship may be dissolved by agreement. Under sections 201 to 210 of the Indian Contract Act 1872, an agency may come to an end in a variety of ways:

1. Withdrawal by the agent – however, the principal cannot revoke an agency coupled with interest to the prejudice of such interest. An agency is coupled with interest when the agent himself has an interest in the subject-matter of the agency, e.g., where the goods are consigned by an upcountry constituent to a commission agent for sale, with poor to recoup himself from the sale proceeds, the advances made by him to the principal against the security of the goods; in such a case, the principal cannot revoke the agent's authority till the goods are actually sold and debts satisfied, nor is the agency terminated by death or insanity (illustrations to s. 201);
2. By the agent renouncing the business of agency;
3. By discharge of the contractual agency obligations.

Alternatively, agency may be terminated by operation of law:

1. By the death of either party;
2. By the insanity of either party;
3. By the bankruptcy (insolvency) of either party;

The principal also cannot revoke the agent's authority after it has been partly exercised, so as to bind the principal (s. 204), though he can always do so, before such authority has been so exercised (s. 203). Further, under s. 205, if the agency is for a fixed period, the principal cannot terminate the agency before the time expired, except for sufficient cause. If he does, he is liable to compensate the agent for the loss caused to him thereby. The same rules apply where the agent, renounces an agency for a fixed period. Notice in this connection that want of skill, continuous disobedience of lawful orders, and rude or insulting behavior has been held to be sufficient cause for dismissal of an agent. Further, reasonable notice has to be given by one party to the other; otherwise, damage resulting from want of such notice, will have to be paid (s. 206). Under s. 207, the revocation or renunciation of an agency may be made expressly or implicitly by conduct. The termination does not take effect as regards the agent, till it becomes known to him and as regards third party, till the termination is known to them (s. 208).

When an agent's authority is terminated, it operates as a termination of subagent also (s. 210).

== Partnerships and companies ==
This has become a more difficult area as states are not consistent on the nature of a partnership. Some states opt for the partnership as no more than an aggregate of the natural persons who have joined the firm. Others treat the partnership as a business entity and, like a corporation, vest the partnership with a separate legal personality. Hence, for example, in English law a partner is the agent of the other partners, whereas in Scots law "a [partnership] is a legal person distinct from the partners of whom it is composed" and so a partner is the agent of the partnership per se. This form of agency is inherent in the status of a partner and does not arise out of a contract of agency with a principal. The Partnership Act 1890 of the United Kingdom (which includes both England and Scotland) provides that a partner who acts within the scope of his actual authority (express or implied) will bind the partnership when he does anything in the ordinary course of carrying on partnership business. Even if that implied authority has been revoked or limited, the partner will have apparent authority unless the third party knows that the authority has been compromised. Hence, if the partnership wishes to limit any partner's authority, it must give express notice of the limitation to the world. However, there would be little substantive difference if English law was amended: partners will bind the partnership rather than their fellow partners individually. For these purposes, the knowledge of the partner acting will be imputed to the other partners, or to the firm if a separate personality. The other partners or the firm are the principal and third parties are entitled to assume that the principal has been informed of all relevant information. This causes problems when one partner acts fraudulently or negligently and causes loss to clients of the firm. In most states, a distinction is drawn between knowledge of the firm's general business activities and the confidential affairs as they affect one client. Thus, there is no imputation if the partner is acting against the interests of the firm as a fraud. There is more likely to be liability in tort if the partnership benefited by receiving fee income for the work negligently performed, even if only as an aspect of the standard provisions of vicarious liability. Whether the injured party wishes to sue the partnership or the individual partners is usually a matter for the plaintiff since, in most jurisdictions, their liability is joint and several.

== Agency relationships ==
Agency relationships are common in many professional areas.

- employment.
- financial advice (insurance agency, stock brokerage, accountancy)
- contract negotiation and promotion (business management) such as for publishing, fashion model, music, movies, theatre, show business, and sport.

An agent in commercial law (also referred to as a manager) is a person who is authorized to act on behalf of another (called the principal or client) to create a legal relationship with a third party.

A legal entity may also act as an agent: For example, two corporate groups may assign the task of intermediating an M&A transaction to a business agency, that acts as a 3rd party, in order to finalize the deal. This happens for example when you move over an entity to an intermediary holding company, before settling it into its final destination entity.

=== Agency relationship in a real estate transaction ===
Real estate transactions refer to real estate brokerage, and mortgage brokerage. In real estate brokerage, the buyers or sellers are the principals themselves and the broker or his salesperson who represents each principal is his agent.

== Applications in jurisdictions ==
=== In the European Union ===
In 1986, the European Communities enacted Directive 86/653/EEC on self-employed commercial agents.

=== In English law ===
Agency law in the United Kingdom is a component of UK commercial law, and forms a core set of rules necessary for the smooth functioning of business. Agency law is primarily governed by the Common law and to a lesser extent by statutory instruments.

In the UK, the EEC Directive on self-employed commercial agents was transposed into national law in the Commercial Agents Regulations 1993. Thus, agent and principals in a commercial agency relationship are subject both to the Common law and the Commercial Agents Regulations.

The Commercial Agents Regulations require agents to act "dutifully and in good faith" in performing their activities (Reg. 3); co-extensively, principals are required principals to act "dutifully and in good faith" in their "relations" with their commercial agents (Reg 4). Although there is no statutory definition of this obligation to act "dutifully and in good faith", it has been suggested that it requires principals and agents to act "with honesty, openness and regard for the interests of the other party to the transaction". Two "normative precepts" assist in concretising this standard of conduct:

"Firstly, expressing honesty and openness, commercial agents and principals must mutually co-operate in the performance of their agreement. Conduct in good faith requires that each party proactively take action to assist the other in the realisation of their bargain, as opposed to mere abstention from obstructive behaviour. However, whether a party has acted in good faith must not be determined by reference to a moral or metaphysical notion of co-operation; this assessment must be based on an objective appraisal of the actual commercial agency relationship. Accordingly, the intensity of the required co-operation will vary, depending on the terms of the contract and the pertinent commercial practices.

Secondly, commercial agents and principals must not exploit asymmetries in their agency relationship in such a manner that frustrates the legitimate expectations of the other party. In this respect, whether a conduct is in breach of the obligation must be appraised holistically, considering all aspects of the relationship; material facts will include the contractual and commercial leverage of each party, their objective intentions as enshrined in the contract, and the business practices of the sector in question. Nevertheless, the starting axiom of this investigation must be that these are commercial relationships in which professionals are expected to be self-reliant and must be free to pursue their self-interest. Critically, this will not be an estimation aimed at achieving ontological fairness, a just bargain or equilibrium between the giving and receiving of commercial agents and principals".

=== In Irish law ===
In Ireland, Directive 86/653/EEC was implemented in the Commercial Agents Regulations of 1994 and 1997.

=== India ===
In India, for the purposes of contractual law, section 182 of the Contract Act 1872 defines an agent as "a person employed to do any act for another or to represent another in dealings with third persons".

According to section 184, as between the principal and third persons, any person (whether he has contractual capacity or not) may become an agent. Thus, a minor or a person of unsound mind can also become an agent.

== Allograph ==
An allograph may be the opposite of an autograph – i.e. a person's words or name (signature) written by someone else. In law, an allograph is a writing or signature made by an agent on behalf of a principal. In American law, checks written by an agent of behalf of, and with the authority of, a principal are allographs for that principal.

== See also ==
- Agency in English law
- Corporate officer – Titles given in an organization to show what duties and responsibilities a person has
- Employee – Person who works for an employer
- Entertainment law – Legal services provided to the entertainment industry
- Faithless servant – American legal doctrine
- Independent contractor – Relationship between employee and employer
- Ostensible authority – Legal doctrine about agents and principals
- Principal–agent problem – Conflict of interest when one person acts on another's behalf
- Cestui que – Concept in English law regarding beneficiaries
- Hawala – Informal currency transfer system
- Registered agent – Someone designated to receive service of process in a legal action
