= Yonge v Toynbee =

- Full case name: Yonge v Toynbee
- Decided: 1910
- Citation: [1910] 1 KB 215

Keywords
- insanity

Yonge v Toynbee [1910] 1 KB 215 is a case in British law regarding the legal effects of a party entering a contract, and later discovered to be insane.

== Background ==
The plaintiff commenced defamation action in the court against the defendant and instructed the lawyers W and Sons to act on their behalf. During these proceedings and unbeknown to their lawyers, the plaintiff was declared legally insane.

As a result, the plaintiff's legal action was struck out by the court by the defendant and then sought costs from W and Sons on the basis that they had no legal authority to represent the plaintiff, as the plaintiff was insane, even though they had no knowledge at the time. The defendant was not legally liable for the costs because of the plaintiff's insanity.

== Decision ==
The defendant's lawyers were liable for costs, as their implied agency to act on the behalf of their defendant ended with the insanity of the plaintiff.
