= Apparent authority =

Legal doctrine about agents and principals

In law, apparent authority (also called "ostensible authority") relates to the doctrines of the law of agency. It is relevant particularly in corporate law and constitutional law. Apparent authority refers to a situation where a reasonable third party would understand that an agent had authority to act. This means a principal is bound by the agent's actions, even if the agent had no actual authority, whether express or implied. It raises an estoppel because the third party is given an assurance, which he relies on and would be inequitable for the principal to deny the authority given. Apparent authority can legally be found, even if actual authority has not been given.

There must be some act or some knowing omission on the part of the principal—if the agent alone acts to give the third party this false impression, then the principal is not bound. However, the principal will be bound if the agent so acts in the presence of the principal, and the principal stands silently and says nothing to dissuade the third party from believing that the agent has the authority to bind the principal. Apparent authority can also occur where a principal terminates the authority of an agent, but does not inform third parties of this termination. This is called lingering apparent authority. Business owners can avoid being liable by giving public notice of the termination of authority, and by contacting any individual third parties who would have had reason to know of such authority.

In relation to companies, the apparent authority of directors, officers and agents of the company is normally referred to as "ostensible authority". Apparent authority issues also arise in the Fourth Amendment context, concerning who has authority to consent to a search.

== Legal provisions ==
Legal jurisdictions which provide for apparent authority include the United States, the United Kingdom, Australia, Canada and South Africa. The doctrine of apparent authority is based on the concept of estoppel, thus, it prevents the principal from denying the existence of agency to a third party, provided that a representation, as to the agent's authority, has been made by him to the third party either through his words or by his actions.

In law, apparent authority refers to the authority of an agent as it appears to others, and it can operate both to enlarge actual authority and to create authority where no actual authority exists. The law relating to companies and to ostensible authority are in reality only a sub-set of the rules relating to apparent authority and the law of agency generally, but because of the prevalence of the issue in relation to corporate law (companies, being artificial persons, are only ever able to act at all through their human agents), it has developed its own specific body of case law. However, some jurisdictions use the terms interchangeably.

In Freeman and Lockyer v Buckhurst Park Properties (Mangal) Ltd [1964] 2 QB 480 the director in question managed the company's property and acted on its behalf and in that role employed the plaintiff architects to draw up plans for the development of land held by the company. The development ultimately collapsed and the plaintiffs sued the company for their fees. The company denied that the director had any authority to employ the architects. The court found that, while he had never been appointed as managing director (and therefore had no actual authority, express or implied) his actions were within his ostensible authority and the board had been aware of his conduct and had acquiesced in it. Diplock LJ identified four factors which must be present before a company can be bound by the acts of an agent who has no authority to do so; it must be shown that:

1. a representation that the agent had authority to enter on behalf of the company into a contract of the kind sought to be enforced was made to the contractor;
2. such a representation was made by a person or persons who has 'actual' authority to manage the business of the company, either generally or in respect of those matters to which the contract relates;
3. the contractor was induced by such representation to enter into the contract, i.e. that he in fact relied upon it; and
4. under its memorandum or articles of association the company was not deprived of the capacity either to enter into a contract of the kind sought to be enforced or to delegate authority to enter into a contract of that kind to an agent.

The agent must have been held out by someone with actual authority to carry out the transaction and an agent cannot hold himself out as having authority for this purpose. The acts of the company as principal must constitute a representation (express or by conduct) that the agent had a particular authority and must be reasonably understood so by the third party. In determining whether the principal had represented his agent as having such authority, the court has to consider the totality of the company's conduct. The most common form of holding out is permitting the agent to act in the conduct of the company's business, and in many cases this is inferred simply from allowing the agent to use a particular title, such as 'finance director'.

The apparent authority must not be undermined by any limitations on the company's capacity or powers found in the memorandum or articles of association, although in many countries, the effect of this is reduced by company law reforms abolishing or restricting the application of the ultra vires doctrine to companies. However, statutory reforms do not affect the general principle that a third party cannot rely upon ostensible authority where it is aware of some limitation which prevents the authority arising, or is put on enquiry as to the extent of an individual's authority. In some circumstances, the very nature of a transaction would be held to put a person on enquiry.

== The rule in Turquand's case ==
The rule in Turquand's case does not enable a third party to hold the company to an unauthorized transaction per se. It allows a third party to assume that a transaction which is within the authority of the directors has been properly authorized, but it requires the third party to establish the fact of authority, actual or apparent, in the first place.

== Ratification ==
It is open to the principal to ratify an unauthorised agreement entered into by an agent. Ratification is the explicit or implicit action of the principal in agreeing, after the unauthorised act, to the act of the agent. Ratification by the principal causes such act to become binding on the third party. Note that without ratification by the principal, the third party is not bound to the unauthorized agreement created by an agent with no apparent authority, until the principal ratifies it. Whereas in the situation of an act done by an agent with ostensible (or apparent) authority, the principal and the third party are bound from the moment the agreement is consummated by the agent and third party.

== See also ==
- Board of directors
- Law of agency
- Royal British Bank v Turquand
- American Society of Mechanical Engineers, Inc. v. Hydrolevel Corp.
