= Principal (commercial law) =

Person who authorizes an agent to create legal relationships with a third party

In commercial law, a principal is a person, legal or natural, who authorizes an agent to act to create one or more legal relationships with a third party. This branch of law is called agency and relies on the common law proposition qui facit per alium, facit per se (from Latin: "he who acts through another, acts personally").

It is a parallel concept to vicarious liability (in which one person is held liable for the acts or omissions of another) in criminal law or torts.

== Concepts ==
In a busy commercial world, the smooth flow of trade depends on the use of agents. This may be because in business entities such as:

- sole traders, their ability to conduct business will always be limited unless other people are used to work on their behalf;
- a partnership, the natural persons who are involved cannot be present to conduct business in multiple locations simultaneously, so they must rely on others to make agreements or deliver services on their behalf; or
- a corporation is only a legal entity or fictitious legal person and so can only act through the agency of human beings to get anything done.

In the majority of cases, it is impossible for agents to seek specific authority for every deal or detail within a deal. Agents must, of necessity, be allowed some degree of discretion in the conduct of routine transactions. But, for the purposes of ascribing legal responsibility to the principal, when the agent acts with actual or apparent authority, all the agent's knowledge will be imputed to the principal. If principals were allowed to hide behind their agents' own ignorance, mistakes or failures to communicate, a principal could, by using an agent, achieve a better result than if they acted personally. For example, if the particular deal turned out well, the principal could adopt the transaction. But, if it turned out badly, the principal could disavow it. Indeed, if not for imputation, there would be a perverse incentive to conduct business through agents rather than personally. Consequently, the principal cannot exploit ignorance to their advantage by instructing the agent to withhold key information or by appointing an agent known to be secretive.

This rule in favour of imputation relates to the duties an agent owes a principal, in particular the agent's duty to communicate material facts to the principal. Since the purpose of the law is to offer protection to Third Parties who have acted in good faith, it is reasonable to allow them to believe that, in most cases, the agents have fulfilled this duty. After all, the principal selects the agents and has the power to control their actions both through express instructions and incentives intended to influence their behaviour which will include laying down routines for how agents should handle information, and the extent to which agents will be rewarded for transmitting information of commercial value. The result is a form of strict liability in which the legal consequences of an agent's acts or omissions are attributed to a principal even when the principal was without fault in appointing or supervising the agent. Borrowing parallel concepts from Tort and Equity, this means that the principal owes the Third Party a duty of care to ensure that the agent is honest and efficient, and that a principal is estopped from denying that an agent was authorised to act as they did.

== Summary of law ==
There are three classes of principal:

3 classes of principal
Class	Description
Disclosed	at the time of the transaction made by the agent with the Third Party, the latter knows that the person he is dealing with is acting as an agent and also knows the principal's identity.
Partially disclosed	at the time of the transaction, the Third Party knows that the person he is dealing with is acting as an agent but does not know the principal's identity.
Undisclosed	The person acting as an agent represents they are acting on their own behalf and does not disclose the existence of the agency relationship.

=== Authority ===
For these purposes, the principal must give, or be deemed to give, the agent authority to act.

- Actual authority

This arises where the principal's words or conduct reasonably cause the agent to believe they have been authorised to act. This may be expressed as a contract or implied because what is said or done make it reasonably necessary for the person to assume the powers of an agent. If it is clear that the principal gave actual authority to agent, all the agent's actions falling within the scope of the authority given bind the principal. This results even if, having actual authority, the agent in fact acts fraudulently for his own benefit, unless the Third Party was aware of the agent's personal agenda. If there is no contract but the principal's words or conduct reasonably led the Third Party to believe that the agent was authorised to act, or if what the agent proposes to do is incidental and reasonably necessary to accomplish an actually authorised transaction or a transaction that usually accompanies it, then the principal is bound.

- Apparent or ostensible authority

If the principal's words or conduct would lead a reasonable person in the Third Party's position to believe that the agent was authorised to act, say by appointing the agent to a position which carries with it agency-like powers, those who know of the appointment are entitled to assume that there is apparent authority to do the things ordinarily entrusted to one occupying such a position. If a principal creates the impression that an agent is authorised but there is no actual authority, Third Parties are protected so long as they have acted reasonably. This is sometimes termed "Agency by Estoppel" or the "Doctrine of Holding Out", where the principal is stopped from denying the grant of authority if Third Parties have changed their positions to their detriment in reliance on the representations made.

- Authority by virtue of a position held

For example, partners have apparent authority to bind the other partners in the firm, their liability being joint and several, and in a corporation, all executives and senior employees with decision-making authority by virtue of their declared position have apparent authority to bind the corporation.

Even if the agent does act without authority, the principal may ratify the transaction and accept liability on the transactions as negotiated. This may be express or implied from the principal's behaviour, e.g., if the agent has purported to act in a number of situations and the principal has knowingly acquiesced, the failure to notify all concerned of the agent's lack of authority is an implied ratification to those transactions and an implied grant of authority for future transactions of a similar nature.

=== Liability ===
==== Agent to Principal ====
If the agent has acted without actual authority, but the principal is nevertheless bound because the agent had apparent authority, the agent is liable to indemnify the principal for any resulting loss or damage.

==== Principal to Agent ====
If the agent has acted within the scope of the actual authority given, the principal must indemnify the agent for payments made during the course of the relationship whether the expenditure was expressly authorized or merely necessary in promoting the principal's business.

==== Third Party to Principal ====
The Third Party is liable to the principal on the terms of the agreement made with the agent, unless the principal was undisclosed and there is clear evidence that either the agent or the principal knew that the Third Party would not have entered into the agreement if they had known of the principal's involvement.

=== Duties ===
The relationship between a principal and an agent is fiduciary which requires the agent to be loyal to the principal. This involves duties:

- not to accept any new obligations that are inconsistent with the duties owed to the principal. Agents can represent the interests of more than one principal, conflicting or potentially conflicting, only on the basis of full and timely disclosure or where the different agencies are based on a limited form of authority to prevent a situation where the agent's loyalty to the any one of the multiple principals is compromised. For this purpose, express clauses in the agreement signed by each principal with the agent may identify specific types or categories of activities that do not breach the duty of loyalty and so long as these exceptions are not unreasonable, they bind the principals.
- not to make a private profit or unjustly enrich himself from the agency relationship. Principals usually include a power in their contract with the agents allowing them to inspect the agents' accounts if reasonable suspicion of improper behavior emerges.

In return, the principal must make a full disclosure of all information relevant to the transactions that the agent is authorized to negotiate and pay the agent either the commission or fee as agreed, or a reasonable fee if none were previously agreed on.

=== Remedies against agent ===
The principal has the following remedies against the agent for breaching his/her fiduciary duty:

==== Constructive trust ====
If the agent wrongfully holds property that should be owned or entitled to the principal, the principal can ask the court to deem it a constructive trust—that the agent is holding the property on behalf of the principal.

==== Avoidance ====
The principal can void contracts negotiated by an agent that breached his or her fiduciary duty.

==== Indemnification ====
The principal can sue the agent for liability caused by the agent's wrongful acts, i.e., if a third party obtained a judgment against the principal for wrongful acts caused by the agent, the principal can sue the agent to recover the loss.

==== Negligence (for not following instructions) ====
A principal can sue for the negligence of an agent who failed to follow instructions, unless it was simply a failure to follow the principal's advice.

=== Undisclosed principal ===
An Undisclosed principal is an unrevealed one, in a situation involving an undisclosed agency. It is "a person who uses an agent for his/her negotiations with a third party, often when the agent pretends to be acting for himself/herself." In a real estate transaction, this could be any "major party to a transaction, such as a seller or purchaser of property," who wishes to remain anonymous.

Some taxing authorities have created rules regarding tax liability for actions of an undisclosed principal. The undisclosed agency may also affect tort liability.

=== Termination ===
The principal can terminate an agent's authority at any time without having to give notice. If the trust between the agent and principal has broken down, it is not reasonable to allow the principal to remain at risk in any transactions that the agent might conclude during a period of notice.

== Economic analysis ==
The analysis of principal–agent relationships is an important topic in economics. The main focus of analysis is on the information asymmetry between the agent, who is assumed to be well informed, and the principal who may not be.

== See also ==
- Agency (law)
- Agent (law)
- Commissionaire
- Corporate officer
- Employee
- Independent contractor
- Insider trading
- Principal (criminal law)
- Seal (contract law)
