= Indian Contract Act, 1872 =

Contract Act

Imperial Legislative Council
- Long title: To define and amend certain parts of the law relating to contracts.
- Citation: Act No. 9 of 1872
- Enacted by: Imperial Legislative Council
- Enacted: 25 April 1872
- Commenced: 1 September 1872
- Status: In force

The Indian Contract Act, 1872 governs the law of contracts in India and is the principal legislation regulating contract law in the country. It is applicable to all states of India. It outlines the circumstances under which promises made by the parties to a contract become legally binding. Section 2(h) of the Act defines a contract as an agreement that is enforceable by law.

== Development and Structure ==
The Act was enacted on 25 April 1872 and came into force on 1 September 1872. The Act, as enacted originally, had 266 Sections, divided into 11 chapters.

- General Principles of Law of Contract – Sections 01 to 75 (Chapter 1 to 6)
- Contract relating to Sale of goods - Sections 76 to 123 (Chapter 7 to 10)
- Contracts relating to Partnership – Sections 239 to 266 (Chapter 11)

Later, the sections of Chapter 7 and 11 were repealed, as they were incorporated into separate legislations namely, Sale of Goods Act, 1930 and the Indian Partnership Act, 1932.

At present, the Indian Contract Act can be divided into two parts:

- Part 1: General Principles of Law of Contract – Sections 1 to 75 (Chapter 1 to 6)
- Part 2: Deals with Special kinds of Contracts such as
  - Contract of Indemnity and Guarantee (Chapter 8)
  - Contract of Bailment and Pledge (Chapter 9)
  - Contract of Agency. (Chapter 10)

== Important Definitions (Section 2) ==
1. Offer 2(a): An offer refers to a promise that is dependent on a certain act, promise, or forbearance given in exchange for the initial promise.

2. Acceptance 2(b): When the person to whom the proposal is made, signifies his assent there to, the proposal is said to be accepted.

3. Promise 2(b): A proposal when accepted becomes a promise. In simple words, when an offer is accepted it becomes promise.

4. Promisor and Promisee 2(c): When the proposal is accepted, the person making the proposal is called as promisor and the person accepting the proposal is called as promisee.

5. Consideration 2(d): When at the desire of the promisor, the promisee or any other person has done or abstained from doing or does or abstains from doing or promises to do or to abstain from doing something such act or abstinence or promise is called a consideration for the promise. Price paid by one party for the promise of the other technical word meaning Quid pro quo which means something in return.

6. Agreement 2(e): Every promise and every set of promises forming the consideration for each other.

7. Reciprocal Promises 2(f): Promises which form the consideration and part of the consideration for each other are called 'reciprocal promises'.

8. Void agreement 2(g): An agreement not enforceable by law is void.

9. Contract 2(h): An agreement enforceable by law is a contract. Therefore, there must be an agreement and it should be enforceable by law.

10. Voidable contract 2(i): An agreement is a voidable contract if it is enforceable by law at the option of one or more of the parties there to (i.e. the aggrieved party), and it is not enforceable by law at the option of the other or others.

11. Void contract 2(j): A contract becomes void when it ceases to be enforceable by law.

== Offer ==
According to Section 2(a), an offer refers to a promise that is dependent on a certain act, promise, or forbearance given in exchange for the initial promise.

=== Types of Offer ===
- Express offer: offer made by using words spoken or written is known as an express offer. (Section 9)
- Implied offer: The offer which could be understood by a conduct of parties or circumstances of case.
- General offer: It is an offer made to public at large with or without any time limit.
- Specific offer: It is a type of offer, where an offer is made to a particular and specified person, it is a specific offer.
- Continuous offer: An offer which is made to the public at large and if it is kept open for public acceptance for a certain period of time.
- Cross offer: When a person to whom proposal (offer) is made signifies his assent, the proposal is said to be accepted.
- Counteroffer: Upon receipt of an offer from an offeror, if the offeree instead of accepting it straightway, imposes conditions which have the effect of modifying or varying the offer.

== Acceptance in contract ==
1. It should be absolute and unqualified.. If the parties are not concurred on all matters concerning the offer and acceptance, there is no valid contract. For example, "A" says to "B" "I offer to sell my car for Rs. 50,000/-. "B" replies "I will purchase it for Rs. 45,000/-". This is not acceptance and hence it amounts to a counter offer.
2. It should be communicated to the offeror. To conclude a contract between parties, the acceptance must be communicated in some prescribed form. A mere mental determination on the part of offeree to accept an offer does not amount to valid acceptance.
3. Acceptance must be in the mode prescribed. If the acceptance is not according to the mode prescribed or some usual and reasonable mode (where no mode is prescribed) the offeror may intimate to the offeree within a reasonable time that acceptance is not according to the mode prescribed and may insist that the offer be accepted in the prescribed mode only. If he does not inform the offeree, he is deemed to have accepted the offer. For example, "A" makes an offer to "B" says to "B" that "if you accept the offer, reply by voice. "B" sends reply by post. It will be a valid acceptance, unless "A" informs "B" that the acceptance is not according to the prescribed mode.
4. Acceptance must be given within a reasonable time before the offer lapses. If any time limit is specified, the acceptance must be given within the time, if no time limit is specified it must be given within a reasonable time.
5. It cannot precede an offer. If the acceptance precedes an offer it is not a valid acceptance and does not result in contract. For example, in a company shares were allotted to a person who had not applied for them. Subsequently, when he applied for shares, he was un aware of the previous allotment . The allotment of share previous to the application is not valid.
6. Acceptance by the way of conduct.
7. Mere silence is no acceptance.

=== Silence as Acceptance ===
Silence does not per-se amounts to communication- Bank of India Ltd. Vs. Rustom Cowasjee- AIR 1955 Bom. 419 at P. 430; 57 Bom. L.R. 850- Mere silence cannot amount to any assent. It does not even amount to any representation on which any plea of estoppel may be found, unless there is a duty to make some statement or to do some act free and offeror must be consent.

1. Acceptance must be unambiguous and definite.
2. Acceptance cannot be given before communication of an offer.

== Lawful consideration ==
According to Section 2(d), consideration is defined as: "When at the desire of the promisor, the promisee or any other person has done or abstained from doing, or does or abstains from doing, or promises to do or abstain from doing something, such act or abstinence or promise is called consideration for the promise". Consideration means 'something in return'.

=== Essentials of Valid Consideration ===
An agreement must be supported by a lawful consideration on both sides. Essentials of valid consideration must include:-

- It must move at the desire of the promisor. An act constituting consideration must have been done at the desire or request of the promisor. If it is done at the instance of a third party or without the desire of the promisor, it will not be good consideration. For example, "A" saves "B"'s goods from fire without being ask him to do so. "A" cannot demand payment for his service.
- Consideration may move from the promisee or any other person. Under Indian law, consideration may be from the promisee of any other person i.e., even a stranger. This means that as long as there is consideration for the promisee, it is immaterial who has furnished it.
- Consideration must be an act, abstinence or forbearance or a returned promise.
- Consideration may be past, present or future. Past consideration is not consideration according to English law. However it is a consideration as per Indian law. Example of past consideration is, "A" renders some service to "B" at latter's desire. After a month "B" promises to compensate "A" for service rendered to him earlier. When consideration is given simultaneously with promise, it is said to be present consideration .. For example, "A" receives Rs. 50/- in return for which he promises to deliver certain goods to "B". The money "A" receives is the present consideration. When consideration to one party to other is to pass subsequently to the maker of the contract, is said to be future consideration. For example. "A" promises to deliver certain goods to "B" after a week. "B" promises to pay the price after a fortnight, such consideration is future.
- Consideration must be real. Consideration must be real, competent and having some value in the eyes of law. For example, "A" promises to put life to "B"'s dead wife, if "B" pay him Rs. 1000/-. "A"'s promise is physically impossible of performance hence there is no real consideration.
- Consideration must be something which the promisor is not already bound to do. A promise to do something what one is already bound to do, either by law, is not a good consideration., since it adds nothing to the previous existing legal consideration.
- Consideration need not be adequate. Consideration need not be necessarily be equal to value to something given. So long as consideration exists, the courts are not concerned as to adequacy, provided it is for some value.

=== Unlawful Consideration ===
The consideration or object of an agreement is lawful, unless and until it is:

1. Forbidden by law: If the object or the consideration of an agreement is for doing an act forbidden by law, such agreement are void. for example, "A" promises "B" to obtain an employment in public service and "B" promises to pay Rs one lakh to "A". The agreement is void as the procuring government job through unlawful means is prohibited.
2. If it involves injury to a person or property of another: For example, "A" borrowed rs.100/- from "B" and executed a bond to work for "B" without pay for a period of 2 years. In case of default, "A" owes to pay the principal sum at once and huge amount of interest. This contract was held void as it involved injury to the person.
3. If courts regards it as immoral: An agreement in which consideration or object of which is immoral is void. For example, An agreement between husband and wife for future separation is void.
4. Is of such nature that, if permitted, it would defeat the provisions of any law:
5. Is fraudulent, or
6. Is opposed to public policy. An agreement which tends to be injurious to the public or against the public good is void. For example, agreements of trading with foreign enemy, agreement to commit crime, agreements which interfere with the administration of justice, agreements which interfere with the course of justice, stifling prosecution, maintenance and champerty.
7. Agreements in restrained of legal proceedings: This deals with two category. One is, agreements restraining enforcement of rights and the other deals with agreements curtailing period of limitation.
8. Trafficking in public offices and titles: agreements for sale or transfer of public offices and title or for procurement of a public recognition like Padma Vibhushan or Padma Shri etc. for monetary consideration is unlawful, being opposed to public policy.
9. Agreements restricting personal liberty: agreements which unduly restricts the personal liberty of parties to it are void as being opposed by public policy.
10. Marriage brokerage agreements: Agreements to procure marriages for rewards are void under the ground that marriage ought to proceed with free and voluntary decisions of parties.
11. Agreements interfering marital duties: Any agreement which interfere with performance of marital duty is void being opposed to public policy. An agreement between husband and wife that the wife will never leave her parental house.
12. Consideration may take in any form-money, goods, services, a promise to marry, a promise to forbear etc.

Contract opposed to public policy can be repudiated by the Court of law even if that contract is beneficial for all of the parties to the contract- What considerations and objects are lawful and what not- Newar Marble Industries Pvt. Ltd. Vs. Rajasthan State Electricity Board, Jaipur, 1993 Cr. L.J. 1191 at 1197, 1198 [Raj.]- Agreement of which object or consideration was opposed to public policy, unlawful and void – What better and what more can be an admission of the fact that the consideration or object of the compounding agreement was abstention by the board from criminally prosecuting the petitioner-company from offense under Section 39 of the act and that the Board has converted the crime into a source of profit or benefit to itself. This consideration or object is clearly opposed to public policy and hence the compounding agreement is unlawful and void under Section 23 of the Act. It is unenforceable as against the Petitioner-Company.

== Competent to contract ==
=== Section 11 of The Indian Contract Act ===
Section 11 of The Indian Contract Act specifies that every person is competent to contract provided that:

1. He is not a minor i.e. an individual who has not attained the age of majority i.e. 18 years in normal case and 21 years if guardian is appointed by the Court.
2. He is of sound mind while making a contract. A person cannot who is usually of unsound mind, but occasionally of sound mind, can make a contract when he is of sound mind. Similarly if a person is usually of sound mind, but occasionally of unsound mind, may not make a valid contract when he is of unsound mind..
3. He is not disqualified from contracting by any other law to which he is subject

There are other laws of the land that disqualify certain persons from contracting. They are:-

- Alien enemy
- Foreign sovereigns, diplomatic staff etc.
- Artificial persons i.e. corporation, companies etc.
- Insolvents
- Convicts
- Pardanashi Women

== Free consents ==
According to Section 13, "Two or more persons are said to be in consent when they agree upon the same thing in the same sense (consensus-ad-idem)".

According to Section 14, "Consent is said to be free when it is not caused by coercion or undue influence or fraud or misrepresentation or mistake".

Elements vitiating free Consent:

1. Coercion (Section 15): "Coercion" is the committing, or threatening to commit, any act forbidden by the Indian Penal Code under (45,1860), or the unlawful detaining, or threatening to detain, any property, to the prejudice of any person whatever, with the intention of causing any person to enter into an agreement. For example, "A" threatens to shoot "B" if he doesn't release him from a debt which he owes to "B". "B" releases "A" under threat. Since the release has been brought about by coercion, such release is not valid.

2. Undue influence (Section 16): "Where a person who is in a position to dominate the will of another enters into a contract with him and the transaction appears on the face of it, or on the evidence, to be unconscionable, the burden of proving that such contract was not induced by undue influence shall lie upon the person in the position to dominate the will of the other".

(Section 16(2)) States that "A person is deemed to be in a position to dominate the will of another;

- Where he holds a real or apparent authority over the other. For example, an employer may be deemed to be having authority over his employee. an income tax authority over to the assessee.
- Where he stands in a fiduciary relationship to other, For example, the relationship of Solicitor with his client, spiritual advisor and devotee.
- Where he makes a contract with a person whose mental capacity is temporarily or permanently affected by the reason of age, illness or mental or bodily distress"

3. Fraud (Section 17): "Fraud" means and includes any act or concealment of material fact or misrepresentation made knowingly by a party to a contract, or with his connivance, or by his agent, with intent to deceive another party thereto of his agent, or to induce him to enter into the contract. Mere silence is not fraud. a contracting party is not obliged to disclose each and everything to the other party. There are two exceptions where even mere silence may be fraud, one is where there is a duty to speak, then keeping silence is fraud. or when silence is in itself equivalent to speech, such silence is fraud.

4. Misrepresentation (Section 18): "Causing, however innocently, a party to an agreement to make a mistake as to the substance of the thing which is the subject of the agreement".

5. Mistake of fact (Section 20): "Where both the parties to an agreement are under a mistake as to a matter of fact essential to the agreement, the agreement is void". A party cannot be allowed to get any relief on the ground that he had done some particular act in ignorance of law. Mistake may be bilateral mistake where both parties to an agreement are under mistake as to the matter of fact. The mistake must relate to a matter of fact essential to the agreement.

== Agency ==
In law, the relationship that exists when one person or party (the principal) engages another (the agent) to act on their behalf, such as performing work, selling goods, or managing business affairs. The law of agency thus governs the legal relationship in which the agent deals with a third party on behalf of the principal. The competent agent is legally capable of acting for this principal vis-à-vis the third party. Hence, the process of concluding a contract through an agent involves a twofold relationship. On the one hand, the law of agency is concerned with the external business relations of an economic unit and with the powers of the various representatives to affect the legal position of the principal. On the other hand, it rules the internal relationship between principal and agent as well, thereby imposing certain duties on the representative (diligence, accounting, good faith, etc.).

Under section 201 to 210 an agency may come to an end in a variety of ways:

(i) By the principal revoking the agency – However, principal cannot revoke an agency coupled with interest to the prejudice of such interest. Such Agency is coupled with interest. An agency is coupled with interest when the agent himself has an interest in the subject-matter of the agency, e.g., where the goods are consigned by an upcountry constituent to a commission agent for sale, with poor to recoup himself from the sale proceeds, the advances made by him to the principal against the security of the goods; in such a case, the principal cannot revoke the agent's authority till the goods are actually sold, nor is the agency terminated by death or insanity. (Illustrations to section 201)
(ii) By the agent renouncing the business of agency;
(iii) By the business of agency being completed;
(iv) By the principal being adjudicated insolvent (Section 201 of The Indian Contract Act. 1872)

The principal also cannot revoke the agent's authority after it has been partly exercised, so as to bind the principal (Section 204), though he can always do so, before such authority has been so exercised (Section 203).

Further, as per section 205, if the agency is for a fixed period, the principal cannot terminate the agency before the time expired, except for sufficient cause. If he does, he is liable to compensate the agent for the loss caused to him thereby. The same rules apply where the agent, renounces an agency for a fixed period. Notice in this connection that want of skill continuous disobedience of lawful orders, and rude or insulting behavior has been held to be sufficient cause for dismissal of an agent. Further, reasonable notice has to be given by one party to the other; otherwise, damage resulting from want of such notice, will have to be paid (Section 206). As per section 207, the revocation or renunciation of an agency may be made expressly or impliedly by conduct. The termination does not take effect as regards the agent, until it becomes known to him and as regards third party, until the termination is known to them (Section 208). Sub-agent who is appointed by an agent for participate on behalf of his work.

When an agent's authority is terminated, it operates as a termination of sub-agent also (Section 210).

== Enforcement of contracts ==
Enforcement of contracts is a significant challenge in India, as the legal system can be slow and litigious. India is ranked 163rd out of 191 countries surveyed by the world bank in terms of the ease of enforcing a contract.

== See also ==
- Australian contract law
- English contract law
- German contract law
- United States contract law
- South African contract law

== Bibliography ==
- Pollock & Mulla, The Indian Contract & Specific Relief Acts, LexisNexis
- Singh, Avtar (2013). Law of Contract (11th ed.). Lucknow: Eastern Book Company. ISBN 978-93-5028-735-4.
