= Watteau v Fenwick =

1893 English legal case

Watteau v Fenwick [1893] 1 QB 346 is an 1893 English case decided by the Queen's Bench. The case addresses the liability of an undisclosed principal.

The plaintiff, Watteau, supplied cigars to a beer house named the "Victoria," which was located at Middlesbrough. The establishment was operated by a man named Humble. Prior to 1888, he had operated the business on his own account, but in that year, he had assigned his interest to the defendants, Messrs. Fenwick and Company. However, Humble remained the manager and continued to operate the business as before. The sign bore his name, and the license was held in his name.

The plaintiff supplied cigars and Bovril to Humble. He was at all times unaware of Fenwick's involvement. Indeed, Fenwick had never given Humble any authority to act on their behalf. But when Watteau was not paid the 25 pounds owed him, he eventually sued Fenwick.

The County Court held that the defendants had held Humble out to the world as having general authority, and that they were therefore liable for the claim because of the implied authority thereby granted.

Dissatisfied with this outcome, the defendants then brought an appeal to the Queen's Bench. That court, Lord Coleridge, Chief Justice, dismissed the appeal. The Court held that once it is established that the defendant was the principal, then the ordinary rules of principal and agent apply, notwithstanding the fact that the relationship was unknown to the plaintiff. The principal is liable for acts of the agent, as long as those are those usually confided to an agent of that character. This is true even though the agent was acting outside the scope of his actual authority.

The Court likened the case to that of a "dormant partner", in which case the partner would be liable for acts within the ordinary authority of the other partner.
