= Allan Scott (businessman) =

Australian truck magnate and businessman

Archibald Allan Scott, AO (1923 – 28 October 2008) was an Australian truck magnate and businessman, best known for his Mount Gambier–based transport, property and media interests.

== Career ==
Scott founded the truck organisation Scott's Transport in Mount Gambier, South Australia, which became one of the biggest freight companies in Australia, rivalling Linfox. In 1988, Scott purchased local rival transport company K&S Freighters and then listed it on the Australian Securities Exchange. Alongside trucking, he had many business interests in Mount Gambier, including the town's newspaper, The Border Watch, and television station SES8. He also owned two regional radio stations, Adelaide radio station 5DN, hotels, shopping centres and cattle properties in Queensland and Victoria.

Scott was awarded a medal of Order of Australia (OAM) in June 1986 and made an Officer of the Order of Australia (AO) in June 2006 for "service to the development of the transport industry, focusing on heavy vehicle driver safety training and through lobbying for improved infrastructure and development of an integrated freight network, and to the community through a broad range of sporting, medical research and aged care organisations".

In 1997, Scott's became a major sponsor of Port Adelaide Football Club upon their entry into the Australian Football League. In early 2004, Scott criticised Port Adelaide coach Mark Williams, stating that Williams would never coach Port to an AFL premiership. Following Port Adelaide's victory in the 2004 AFL Grand Final, Williams made the famous speech "Allan Scott — You were wrong!".

== Personal life ==
After a 55-year career, Scott died of heart failure on 28 October 2008 in hospital in Mount Gambier aged 85. He was survived by his wife Grace, children, and 14 grandchildren. His death as one of Australia's richest people led to a highly publicised legal battle over his $600 million fortune among his family.
