= List of acts of the Parliament of the United Kingdom from 1954 =

This is a complete list of acts of the Parliament of the United Kingdom for the year 1954.

Note that the first parliament of the United Kingdom was held in 1801; parliaments between 1707 and 1800 were either parliaments of Great Britain or of Ireland. For acts passed up until 1707, see the list of acts of the Parliament of England and the list of acts of the Parliament of Scotland. For acts passed from 1707 to 1800, see the list of acts of the Parliament of Great Britain. See also the list of acts of the Parliament of Ireland.

For acts of the devolved parliaments and assemblies in the United Kingdom, see the list of acts of the Scottish Parliament, the list of acts of the Northern Ireland Assembly, and the list of acts and measures of Senedd Cymru; see also the list of acts of the Parliament of Northern Ireland.

The number shown after each act's title is its chapter number. Acts passed before 1963 are cited using this number, preceded by the year(s) of the reign during which the relevant parliamentary session was held; thus the Union with Ireland Act 1800 is cited as "39 & 40 Geo. 3 c. 67", meaning the 67th act passed during the session that started in the 39th year of the reign of George III and which finished in the 40th year of that reign. Note that the modern convention is to use Arabic numerals in citations (thus "41 Geo. 3" rather than "41 Geo. III"). Acts of the last session of the Parliament of Great Britain and the first session of the Parliament of the United Kingdom are both cited as "41 Geo. 3". Acts passed from 1963 onwards are simply cited by calendar year and chapter number.

== 2 & 3 Eliz. 2 ==
Continuing the third session of the 40th Parliament of the United Kingdom, which met from 3 November 1953 until 25 November 1954.

=== Public general acts ===
Short title	Citation	Royal assent
Long title
Navy, Army and Air Force Reserves Act 1954 (repealed)	2 & 3 Eliz. 2. c. 10	10 February 1954
An Act to make further provision for the liability to be recalled to service of certain persons who have served in the armed forces of the Crown and for purposes connected with the matter aforesaid. (Repealed by Statute Law (Repeals) Act 1976 (c. 16))
Licensing (Seamen's Canteens) Act 1954 (repealed)	2 & 3 Eliz. 2. c. 11	10 February 1954
An Act to make provision for the sale of intoxicating liquor in seamen's canteens, and to revoke Regulation 60AA of the Defence (General) Regulations, 1939; and for purposes connected with the matters aforesaid. (Repealed for Scotland by Licensing (Scotland) Act 1959 (7 & 8 Eliz. 2. c. 51) and for England and Wales by Licensing Act 1964 (c. 26))
Currency and Bank Notes Act 1954	2 & 3 Eliz. 2. c. 12	10 February 1954
An Act to amend the law with respect to the issue and recall of bank notes by the Bank of England.
Local Government (Financial Provisions) (Scotland) Act 1954 (repealed)	2 & 3 Eliz. 2. c. 13	10 February 1954
An Act to make provision with respect to the payment of Exchequer Grants to local authorities in Scotland in lieu of the grants payable to such authorities under Part II of the Local Government Act, 1948; (Note: Local Government Act 1948 (11 & 12 Geo. 6. c. 26)) with respect to the apportionment of the expenditure of county councils among burghs and landward areas, of the expenses of joint committees and other joint bodies among their constituent authorities, and of the payments made under Part V of the said Act of 1948, for the benefit of local authorities in Scotland by the British Transport Commission, the British Electricity Authority and the North of Scotland Hydro-Electric Board among those local authorities; and for purposes connected with the matters aforesaid. (Repealed by Statute Law (Repeals) Act 1976 (c. 16))
National Museum of Antiquities of Scotland Act 1954 (repealed)	2 & 3 Eliz. 2. c. 14	10 February 1954
An Act to provide for the establishment of a Board to manage the National Museum of Antiquities of Scotland and to amend the provisions of the National Galleries of Scotland Act, 1906, (Note: National Galleries of Scotland Act 1906 (6 Edw. 7. c. 50)) relating to the constitution of the Board constituted thereunder. (Repealed by National Heritage (Scotland) Act 1985 (c. 16))
Cinematograph Film Production (Special Loans) Act 1954 (repealed)	2 & 3 Eliz. 2. c. 15	9 March 1954
An Act to extend the period during which loans and advances may be made under the Cinematograph Film Production (Special Loans) Acts, 1949 to 1952; to authorise the National Film Finance Corporation to enter into special arrangements with respect to certain loans; and for purposes connected therewith. (Repealed by National Film Finance Corporation Act 1981 (c. 15))
Industrial Diseases (Benefit) Act 1954 (repealed)	2 & 3 Eliz. 2. c. 16	9 March 1954
An Act to amend the Pneumoconiosis and Byssinosis Benefit Act, 1951, (Note: Pneumoconiosis and Byssinosis Benefit Act 1951 (15 & 16 Geo. 6 & 1 Eliz. 2. c. 4)) by applying it to diseases in respect of which compensation was payable under the Workmen's Compensation Act, 1925, (Note: Workmen's Compensation Act 1925 (15 & 16 Geo. 5. c. 84)) and by making provision for the payment of benefit for partial disablement, and for purposes incidental thereto. (Repealed by Industrial Injuries and Diseases (Old Cases) Act 1967 (c. 34))
Royal Irish Constabulary (Widows' Pensions) Act 1954 (repealed)	2 & 3 Eliz. 2. c. 17	9 March 1954
An Act to provide for the payment of supplementary allowances and of pensions to persons who are or have been widows of certain former members of the Royal Irish Constabulary. (Repealed by Police (Northern Ireland) Act 1998 (c. 32))
Merchant Shipping Act 1954 (repealed)	2 & 3 Eliz. 2. c. 18	9 March 1954
An Act to amend the law with respect to the deductions to be made for the space occupied by the propelling power in measuring the tonnage of merchant ships in which the tonnage of the space solely occupied by and necessary for the proper working of the boilers and machinery does not exceed thirteen, or in the case of ships propelled by paddle wheels twenty, per cent. of the gross tonnage. (Repealed by Merchant Shipping Act 1965 (c. 47))
Civil Defence (Electricity Undertakings) Act 1954 (repealed)	2 & 3 Eliz. 2. c. 19	9 March 1954
An Act to enable grants to be made in respect of measures taken to secure the due functioning of electricity undertakings in Great Britain in the event of hostile attack. (Repealed by Electricity Act 1989 (c. 29))
Development of Inventions Act 1954 (repealed)	2 & 3 Eliz. 2. c. 20	18 March 1954
An Act to extend to ten years the period during which advances may be made to the National Research Development Corporation out of the Consolidated Fund and during which the Board of Trade may with the approval of the Treasury waive payments by way of interest on such advances; to make further provision as to the functions of the Corporation relating to research; and otherwise to amend the Development of Inventions Act, 1948. (Note: Development of Inventions Act 1948 (11 & 12 Geo. 6. c. 60)) (Repealed by Development of Inventions Act 1967 (c. 32))
Rights of Entry (Gas and Electricity Boards) Act 1954	2 & 3 Eliz. 2. c. 21	18 March 1954
An Act to regulate the exercise of statutory rights of entry by or on behalf of Gas Boards and Electricity Boards, and for purposes connected with the matter aforesaid.
Consolidated Fund Act 1954 (repealed)	2 & 3 Eliz. 2. c. 22	26 March 1954
An Act to apply certain sums out of the Consolidated Fund to the service of the years ending on the thirty-first day of March, one thousand nine hundred and fifty-three, one thousand nine hundred and fifty-four and one thousand nine hundred and fifty-five. (Repealed by Statute Law Revision Act 1964 (c. 79))
Hill Farming Act 1954 (repealed)	2 & 3 Eliz. 2. c. 23	26 March 1954
An Act to amend section ten of the Hill Farming Act, 1946, (Note: Hill Farming Act 1946 (9 & 10 Geo. 6. c. 73)) and to provide for the registration of conditions applied to cottages under that section. (Repealed by Statute Law (Repeals) Act 2004 (c. 14))
Cotton Act 1954 (repealed)	2 & 3 Eliz. 2. c. 24	14 April 1954
An Act to modify the functions of the Raw Cotton Commission, to repeal the monopoly provisions of the Cotton (Centralised Buying) Act, 1947, (Note: Cotton (Centralised Buying) Act 1947 (10 & 11 Geo. 6. c. 26)) and to make consequential provision as respects members, officers, servants and agents of the Commission; to make provision for enabling the Commission to be wound up and dissolved; and for purposes connected with the matters aforesaid. (Repealed by Statute Law (Repeals) Act 1973 (c. 39))
Pensions (Increase) Act 1954 (repealed)	2 & 3 Eliz. 2. c. 25	14 April 1954
An Act to amend section two of the Pensions (Increase) Act, 1944, (Note: Pensions (Increase) Act 1944 (7 & 8 Geo. 6. c. 21)) by abolishing the limit of pension up to which increases may be made under that section and substituting ten per cent. for the scale of increases authorised by that section; and for purposes connected therewith. (Repealed by Pensions (Increase) Act 1971 (c. 56))
British Industries Fair (Guarantees and Grants) Act 1954 (repealed)	2 & 3 Eliz. 2. c. 26	14 April 1954
An Act to empower the Treasury to guarantee loans and the Board of Trade to make grants to British Industries Fair Limited. (Repealed by Statute Law Revision Act 1960 (8 & 9 Eliz. 2. c. 56))
Judges' Remuneration Act 1954 (repealed)	2 & 3 Eliz. 2. c. 27	14 April 1954
An Act to increase the salaries attached to certain high judicial offices and to regulate the payments to be made to Judges of the High Court in England in respect of their expenses when acting under commissions of assize and other commissions. (Repealed by Courts Act 1971 (c. 23))
Telegraph Act 1954 (repealed)	2 & 3 Eliz. 2. c. 28	13 May 1954
An Act to authorise increased charges for telegrams, and for purposes connected with such charges. (Repealed by Telegraph Act 1962 (10 & 11 Eliz. 2. c. 14))
Niall Macpherson Indemnity Act 1954 (repealed)	2 & 3 Eliz. 2. c. 29	13 May 1954
An Act to indemnify Niall Macpherson, Esquire, from any penal consequences which he may have incurred by sitting or voting as a member of the House of Commons while holding the office of member of the London agency of the Dried Fruits Control Board of the Commonwealth of Australia, and to remove any disqualification for membership of that House by reason of his having held that office. (Repealed by Representation of the People Act 1969 (c. 15))
Protection of Birds Act 1954 (repealed)	2 & 3 Eliz. 2. c. 30	4 June 1954
An Act to amend the law relating to the protection of birds. (Repealed by Wildlife and Countryside Act 1981 (c. 69))
Coroners Act 1954 (repealed)	2 & 3 Eliz. 2. c. 31	4 June 1954
An Act to amend the law as to the fees and allowances payable by coroners to witnesses, to persons summoned to attend as witnesses and to medical practitioners making post mortem examinations by the coroner's direction or at the coroner's request. (Repealed by Coroners Act 1988 (c. 13))
Atomic Energy Authority Act 1954	2 & 3 Eliz. 2. c. 32	4 June 1954
An Act to provide for the setting up of an Atomic Energy Authority for the United Kingdom, to make provision as to their powers, duties, rights and liabilities, to amend, consequentially on the establishment of and otherwise in connection with that Authority, the Atomic Energy Act, 1946, (Note: Atomic Energy Act 1946 (9 & 10 Geo. 6. c. 80)) the Radioactive Substances Act, 1948, (Note: Radioactive Substances Act 1948 (11 & 12 Geo. 6. c. 37)) and certain other enactments, and for purposes connected with the matters aforesaid.
Pool Betting Act 1954 (repealed)	2 & 3 Eliz. 2. c. 33	4 June 1954
An Act to regulate the disposal of moneys and to provide for the publication of certain accounts and information in connection with pool betting; to permit ready money bets in certain circumstances by way of pool betting conducted by post and in that connection to repeal the Ready Money Football Betting Act, 1920, and to restrict the application of the Betting Act, 1853; and for purposes connected therewith. (Repealed by Betting, Gaming and Lotteries Act 1963 (c. 2))
Law Reform (Enforcement of Contracts) Act 1954 (repealed)	2 & 3 Eliz. 2. c. 34	4 June 1954
An Act to amend section four of the Statute of Frauds, 1677; (Note: Statute of Frauds (29 Cha. 2. c. 3)) and to repeal section four of the Sale of Goods Act, 1893. (Note: Sale of Goods Act 1893 (56 & 57 Vict. c. 71)) (Repealed by Statute Law (Repeals) Act 1974 (c. 22))
Army and Air Force (Annual) Act 1954 (repealed)	2 & 3 Eliz. 2. c. 35	4 June 1954
An Act to provide, during twelve months, for the discipline and regulation of the Army and the Air Force. (Repealed by Revision of the Army and Air Force Acts (Transitional Provisions) Act 1955 (3 & 4 Eliz. 2. c. 20))
Law Reform (Limitation of Actions, etc.) Act 1954 (repealed)	2 & 3 Eliz. 2. c. 36	4 June 1954
An Act to assimilate, in certain respects and subject to certain exceptions and special provisions, the law applicable to proceedings against public authorities (including the Crown) and persons acting in pursuance or execution or intended execution of enactments to that applicable in other cases; to amend the law as to the time limited for bringing legal proceedings and as to the survival of causes of action against the estates of deceased persons; and for purposes connected with the matters aforesaid. (Repealed by Statute Law (Repeals) Act 1978 (c. 45))
Superannuation (President of Industrial Court) Act 1954 (repealed)	2 & 3 Eliz. 2. c. 37	4 June 1954
An Act to provide for pensions and other superannuation benefits in respect of service as president of the Industrial Court. (Repealed by Statute Law (Repeals) Act 1978 (c. 45))
Supreme Court Officers (Pensions) Act 1954 (repealed)	2 & 3 Eliz. 2. c. 38	4 June 1954
An Act to improve the pension rights of official referees, to confer pension rights on certain officers attached to Judges of the Supreme Court in England, or of the Supreme Court in Northern Ireland, and on persons employed in the lunacy office in Northern Ireland, to amend the law with respect to the appointment and conditions of employment of the said officers and to modify certain enactments making the salary and pension rights of officers of those courts depend on their appointment with a certificate from the Civil Service Commissioners. (Repealed by Senior Courts Act 1981 (c. 54))
Agriculture (Miscellaneous Provisions) Act 1954	2 & 3 Eliz. 2. c. 39	4 June 1954
An Act to continue the power to make grants or contributions in respect of field drainage, liming and other matters; to amend Part IV of the Agriculture Act, 1947, (Note: Agriculture Act 1947 (10 & 11 Geo. 6. c. 48)) with respect to the holdings to be treated as smallholdings, and to the contributions to losses of smallholdings authorities; to alter the manner of appointing nominated members of Agricultural Land Tribunals, and enable those Tribunals to award costs and to refer questions of law to the High Court; to amend the Agricultural Holdings Act, 1948, (Note: Agricultural Holdings Act 1948 (11 & 12 Geo. 6. c. 63)) with respect to the operation of certain notices to quit; to make further provision with respect to research and education in sugar beet growing, to the collection of waste for use as animal feeding stuffs, to preventing the spread of pests and diseases by imported bees and to the application of the Diseases of Animals Act, 1950, (Note: Diseases of Animals Act 1950 (14 Geo. 6. c. 36)) to air transport; to amend the Seeds Act, 1920, (Note: Seeds Act 1920 (10 & 11 Geo. 5. c. 54)) with respect to the consequences of contraventions of that Act, and to the delivery and effect of particulars given thereunder; to amend the law as to agricultural wages of holiday workers in Scotland; and to extend the Corn Returns Act, 1882, (Note: Corn Returns Act 1882 (45 & 46 Vict. c. 37)) to Scotland.
Protection of Animals (Amendment) Act 1954	2 & 3 Eliz. 2. c. 40	5 July 1954
An Act to extend the powers of the courts to disqualify for having custody of animals persons convicted of cruelty to them and to increase the maximum fine for offences of cruelty to animals; and for purposes connected therewith. (Repealed for Scotland by Animal Health and Welfare (Scotland) Act 2006 (asp 11))
Juries Act 1954 (repealed)	2 & 3 Eliz. 2. c. 41	5 July 1954
An Act to amend the provisions of the Juries Act, 1949, (Note: Juries Act 1949 (12, 13 & 14 Geo. 6. c. 27)) as to payments in respect of jury service. (Repealed by Statute Law (Repeals) Act 1974 (c. 22))
Slaughterhouses Act 1954 (repealed)	2 & 3 Eliz. 2. c. 42	5 July 1954
An Act to make local authorities responsible for the time being for securing that adequate slaughterhouse facilities are available locally; to explain and amend the law with respect to the provision by local authorities of public slaughterhouses, the making of charges in respect of such slaughterhouses and the grant and renewal of licences under section fifty-seven of the Food and Drugs Act, 1938; (Note: Food and Drugs Act 1938 (1 & 2 Geo. 6. c. 56)) to make further provision with respect to the regulation and restriction of private slaughterhouses and the payment of compensation where a licence or registration in respect of such a slaughterhouse is refused or ceases to be in force; and for purposes connected with the matters aforesaid. (Repealed for Scotland by Slaughter of Animals (Scotland) Act 1980 (c. 13) and for England and Wales by Statute Law (Repeals) Act 1981 (c. 19))
Industrial and Provident Societies (Amendment) Act 1954 (repealed)	2 & 3 Eliz. 2. c. 43	5 July 1954
An Act to amend the Industrial and Provident Societies Acts, 1893 to 1952. (Repealed by Industrial and Provident Societies Act 1965 (c. 12))
Finance Act 1954	2 & 3 Eliz. 2. c. 44	30 July 1954
An Act to grant certain duties, to alter other duties, and to amend the law relating to the National Debt and the Public Revenue, and to make further provision in connection with Finance.
Appropriation Act 1954 (repealed)	2 & 3 Eliz. 2. c. 45	30 July 1954
An Act to apply a sum out of the Consolidated Fund to the service of the year ending on the thirty-first day of March, one thousand nine hundred and fifty-five; and to appropriate the supplies granted in this Session of Parliament. (Repealed by Statute Law Revision Act 1964 (c. 79))
Protection of Animals (Anaesthetics) Act 1954	2 & 3 Eliz. 2. c. 46	30 July 1954
An Act to repeal the Animals (Anaesthetics) Act, 1919, (Note: Animals (Anæsthetics) Act 1919 (9 & 10 Geo. 5. c. 54)) and to extend the provisions of the Protection of Animals Acts in relation to the performance of operations on animals. (Repealed for England and Wales by Animal Welfare Act 2006 (c. 45))
Marriage Act 1949 (Amendment) Act 1954	2 & 3 Eliz. 2. c. 47	30 July 1954
An Act to amend the requirements of the Marriage Act, 1949, (Note: Marriage Act 1949 (12, 13 & 14 Geo. 6. c. 76)) relating to marriages in registration districts in which neither party to the marriage resides.
Summary Jurisdiction (Scotland) Act 1954 (repealed)	2 & 3 Eliz. 2. c. 48	30 July 1954
An Act to consolidate certain enactments relating to summary jurisdiction and procedure in Scotland with corrections and improvements made under the Consolidation of Enactments (Procedure) Act, 1949. (Note: Consolidation of Enactments (Procedure) Act 1949 (12, 13 & 14 Geo. 6. c. 33)) (Repealed by Criminal Procedure (Consequential Provisions) (Scotland) Act 1995 (c. 40))
Long Leases (Scotland) Act 1954	2 & 3 Eliz. 2. c. 49	30 July 1954
An Act to enable lessees and sub-lessees occupying residential property in Scotland under certain long leases to obtain a feu right of such property on certain conditions; to extend and amend the Registration of Leases (Scotland) Act, 1857; (Note: Registration of Leases (Scotland) Act 1857 (20 & 21 Vict. c. 26)) and for purposes connected with the matters aforesaid.
Housing (Repairs and Rents) (Scotland) Act 1954 (repealed)	2 & 3 Eliz. 2. c. 50	30 July 1954
An Act to make further provision as respects Scotland for the clearance and redevelopment of areas of unfit housing accommodation, and for securing or promoting the reconditioning and maintenance of houses, and otherwise to amend the enactments relating to housing and rent control; to provide for disregarding for the purposes of valuation and rating increases in the rent of certain houses in respect of expenditure incurred in reconditioning and maintaining those houses; to limit the rates payable by owners of rent-controlled houses; and for purposes connected with the matters aforesaid. (Repealed by Housing (Scotland) Act 1987 (c. 26))
Hire-Purchase Act 1954 (repealed)	2 & 3 Eliz. 2. c. 51	30 July 1954
An Act to extend the application of the Hire-Purchase Act, 1938, (Note: Hire-Purchase Act 1938 (1 & 2 Geo. 6. c. 53)) and the Hire Purchase and Small Debt (Scotland) Act, 1932; (Note: Hire Purchase and Small Debt (Scotland) Act 1932 (22 & 23 Geo. 5. c. 38)) and to make further provision as to postponed orders for specific delivery of goods under the said Act of 1938. (Repealed for Scotland by Hire-Purchase Act 1964 (c. 53) and for England and Wales by Hire-Purchase Act 1965 (c. 66))
Gas and Electricity (Borrowing Powers) Act 1954 (repealed)	2 & 3 Eliz. 2. c. 52	30 July 1954
An Act to increase the limits imposed by section thirty-nine of the Electricity Act, 1947, (Note: Electricity Act 1947 (10 & 11 Geo. 6. c. 54)) on the amount outstanding in respect of borrowings of the British Electricity Authority and Area Electricity Boards and by section forty-two of the Gas Act, 1948, (Note: Gas Act 1948 (11 & 12 Geo. 6. c. 67)) on the amount outstanding in respect of borrowings of the Gas Council and Area Gas Boards. (Repealed by Gas Act 1960 (8 & 9 Eliz. 2. c. 27))
Housing Repairs and Rents Act 1954	2 & 3 Eliz. 2. c. 53	30 July 1954
An Act to make further provision for the clearance and redevelopment of areas of unfit housing accommodation, and for securing or promoting the reconditioning and maintenance of houses; and otherwise to amend the enactments relating to housing, the exercise of certain powers relating to land, and rent control.
Isle of Man (Customs) Act 1954 (repealed)	2 & 3 Eliz. 2. c. 54	30 July 1954
An Act to amend the law with respect to customs in the Isle of Man. (Repealed for the Isle of Man by Customs and Excise etc. Order 1976 (GC No 1/76))
Television Act 1954 (repealed)	2 & 3 Eliz. 2. c. 55	30 July 1954
An Act to make provision for television broadcasting services in addition to those provided by the British Broadcasting Corporation, and to set up a special authority for that purpose; to make provision as to the constitution, powers, duties and financial resources of that authority and as to the position and obligations of persons contracting with that authority for the provision of programmes and parts of programmes; and for purposes connected with the matters aforesaid. (Repealed by Television Act 1964 (c. 21))
Landlord and Tenant Act 1954	2 & 3 Eliz. 2. c. 56	30 July 1954
An Act to provide security of tenure for occupying tenants under certain leases of residential property at low rents and for occupying sub-tenants of tenants under such leases; to enable tenants occupying property for business, professional or certain other purposes to obtain new tenancies in certain cases; to amend and extend the Landlord and Tenant Act, 1927, (Note: Landlord and Tenant Act 1927 (17 & 18 Geo. 5. c. 36)) the Leasehold Property (Repairs) Act, 1938, (Note: Leasehold Property (Repairs) Act 1938 (1 & 2 Geo. 6. c. 34)) and section eighty-four of the Law of Property Act, 1925; (Note: Law of Property Act 1925 (15 & 16 Geo. 5. c. 20)) to confer jurisdiction on the County Court in certain disputes between landlords and tenants; to make provision for the termination of tenancies of derelict land; and for purposes connected with the matters aforesaid.
Baking Industry (Hours of Work) Act 1954 or the Night Baking Act (repealed)	2 & 3 Eliz. 2. c. 57	30 July 1954
An Act to restrict night work in the baking industry, and for purposes connected therewith. (Repealed by Sex Discrimination Act 1986 (c. 59))
Charitable Trusts (Validation) Act 1954	2 & 3 Eliz. 2. c. 58	30 July 1954
An Act to validate under the law of England and Wales, and restrict to charitable objects, certain instruments taking effect before the sixteenth day of December, nineteen hundred and fifty-two, and providing for property to be held or applied for objects partly but not exclusively charitable, and to enable corresponding provision to be made by the Parliament of Northern Ireland.
Slaughter of Animals (Amendment) Act 1954 (repealed)	2 & 3 Eliz. 2. c. 59	30 July 1954
An Act to implement certain recommendations of the Committee of Inquiry into the Slaughter of Horses, and otherwise to amend the enactments relating to the slaughter of animals. (Repealed for Scotland by Slaughter of Animals (Scotland) Act 1980 (c. 13) and for England and Wales by Statute Law (Repeals) Act 1981 (c. 19))
Electricity Reorganisation (Scotland) Act 1954 (repealed)	2 & 3 Eliz. 2. c. 60	25 November 1954
An Act to transfer the functions of the Minister of Fuel and Power in Scotland in relation to electricity to the Secretary of State; to establish the South of Scotland Electricity Board; to transfer the functions of the British Electricity Authority in the south of Scotland and of the Scottish Area Boards to that Board; to amend the Hydro-Electric Development (Scotland) Act, 1943; (Note: Hydro-Electric Development (Scotland) Act 1943 (6 & 7 Geo. 6. c. 32)) and for purposes connected therewith. (Repealed by Electricity Act 1989 (c. 29))
Pharmacy Act 1954 (repealed)	2 & 3 Eliz. 2. c. 61	25 November 1954
An Act to consolidate certain enactments relating to pharmacy with corrections and improvements made under the Consolidation of Enactments (Procedure) Act, 1949. (Repealed by Pharmacists and Pharmacy Technicians Order 2007 (SI 2007/289))
Post Office Savings Bank Act 1954 (repealed)	2 & 3 Eliz. 2. c. 62	25 November 1954
An Act to consolidate the enactments relating to post office savings banks. (Repealed by National Savings Bank Act 1971 (c. 29))
Trustee Savings Banks Act 1954 (repealed)	2 & 3 Eliz. 2. c. 63	25 November 1954
An Act to consolidate the enactments relating to trustee savings banks. (Repealed by Trustee Savings Banks Act 1969 (c. 50))
Transport Charges &c. (Miscellaneous Provisions) Act 1954	2 & 3 Eliz. 2. c. 64	25 November 1954
An Act to amend the law relating to the charges of certain undertakings connected with transport and to the accounts and returns to be prepared by railway undertakings, being in either case undertakings which do not form part of the undertakings of the British Transport Commission; to revoke in part (with savings) Defence Regulation 56; to provide for the control of the number of passengers to be carried on public service vehicles, tramcars and trolley vehicles; to repeal the Railway Freight Rebates Enactments, 1929 to 1943; and for purposes connected with the matters aforesaid.
National Gallery and Tate Gallery Act 1954 (repealed)	2 & 3 Eliz. 2. c. 65	25 November 1954
An Act to amend the law relating to the National Gallery and the Tate Gallery and for purposes connected therewith. (Repealed by Museums and Galleries Act 1992 (c. 44))
Civil Defence (Armed Forces) Act 1954 (repealed)	2 & 3 Eliz. 2. c. 66	25 November 1954
An Act to provide for the training in civil defence of persons serving terms of part-time service under the National Service Act, 1948, (Note: National Service Act 1948 (11 & 12 Geo. 6. c. 64)) and other members of the armed forces of the Crown, and to remove doubts as to the civil defence functions of members of those forces; and for purposes connected with the matters aforesaid. (Repealed by Civil Contingencies Act 2004 (c. 36))
Food and Drugs Amendment Act 1954 (repealed)	2 & 3 Eliz. 2. c. 67	25 November 1954
An Act to amend the Food and Drugs Act, 1938, and the Food and Drugs (Milk, Dairies and Artificial Cream) Act, 1950, (Note: Food and Drugs (Milk, Dairies and Artificial Cream) Act 1950 (14 Geo. 6. c. 35)) and for purposes connected therewith. (Repealed by Food and Drugs Act 1955 (4 & 5 Eliz. 2. c. 16))
Pests Act 1954	2 & 3 Eliz. 2. c. 68	25 November 1954
An Act to make further provision with respect to the destruction or control of rabbits and other animals and birds, and to the use of spring traps for killing or taking animals.
Expiring Laws Continuance Act 1954 (repealed)	2 & 3 Eliz. 2. c. 69	25 November 1954
An Act to continue certain expiring laws. (Repealed by Statute Law Revision Act 1963 (c. 30))
Mines and Quarries Act 1954	2 & 3 Eliz. 2. c. 70	25 November 1954
An Act to make fresh provision with respect to the management and control of mines and quarries and for securing the safety, health and welfare of persons employed thereat; to regulate the employment thereat of women and young persons; to require the fencing of abandoned and disused mines and of quarries; and for purposes connected with the matters aforesaid.
Overseas Resources Development Act 1954 (repealed)	2 & 3 Eliz. 2. c. 71	25 November 1954
An Act to provide for the transfer to a statutory corporation constituted under the law of Tanganyika of the undertaking of the Overseas Food Corporation, and the dissolution of the last-mentioned Corporation; for the provision of funds under the Colonial Development and Welfare Act, 1940, (Note: Colonial Development and Welfare Act 1940 (3 & 4 Geo. 6. c. 40)) in connection with the carrying on of the said undertaking; for the conclusion of fresh arrangements as to the obligations and rights of the last-mentioned Corporation in connection with the Southern Province port and railway; for the remission of interest on certain advances made under the Overseas Resources Development Act, 1948, (Note: Overseas Resources Development Act 1948 (11 & 12 Geo. 6. c. 15)) to the Colonial Development Corporation; and for purposes connected with the matters aforesaid. (Repealed by Tanganyika Independence Act 1961 (10 & 11 Eliz. 2. c. 1))
Town and Country Planning Act 1954	2 & 3 Eliz. 2. c. 72	25 November 1954
An Act to make provision for compensation and other payments by reference to claims for payments under section fifty-eight of the Town and Country Planning Act, 1947; (Note: Town and Country Planning Act 1947 (10 & 11 Geo. 6. c. 51)) to make further provision as to the acquisition of land by public authorities, as to compensation in respect of orders revoking or modifying permission to develop land and in respect of damage to requisitioned land, as to development charges, as to monopoly value of licensed premises, as to Exchequer grants under the said Act of 1947, and as to payments under section fifty-nine of that Act, and to amend other provisions of that Act; to make further provision for the modification of mining leases and orders granting working rights, and as to contributions to the Ironstone Restoration Fund; to make provision for the dissolution of the Central Land Board; and for purposes connected with the matters aforesaid.
Town and Country Planning (Scotland) Act 1954	2 & 3 Eliz. 2. c. 73	25 November 1954
An Act to make provision with respect to Scotland for compensation and other payments by reference to claims for payments under section fifty-five of the Town and Country Planning (Scotland) Act, 1947; (Note: Town and Country Planning (Scotland) Act 1947 (10 & 11 Geo. 6. c. 53)) to make further provision as to the acquisition of land by public authorities, as to compensation in respect of orders revoking or modifying permission to develop land and in respect of damage to requisitioned land, as to development charges, as to Exchequer grants under the said Act of 1947, and as to payments under section fifty-six of that Act, and to amend other provisions of that Act; to make further provision for the modification of mining leases and orders granting working rights; to make further provision for the assessment under section one hundred and eight of the Lands Clauses Consolidation (Scotland) Act, 1845, (Note: Lands Clauses Consolidation (Scotland) Act 1845 (8 & 9 Vict. c. 19)) of the consideration payable in respect of the discharge of acquired land from feu-duty and ground annuals and other burdens; to provide for the transfer of the functions in Scotland of the Central Land Board, on the dissolution of that Board, to the Secretary of State; and for purposes connected with the matters aforesaid.

=== Local acts ===
Short title	Citation	Royal assent
Long title
Northern Assurance Act 1954	2 & 3 Eliz. 2. c. iii	26 March 1954
An Act to repeal and amend certain provisions of the Northern Assurance Act 1908; (Note: Northern Assurance Act 1908 (8 Edw. 7. c. lxvi)) and for other purposes.
Dover Harbour Consolidation Act 1954	2 & 3 Eliz. 2. c. iv	14 April 1954
An Act to consolidate the Dover Harbour Acts 1828 to 1953 and certain provisions of the Harbours and Passing Tolls &c. Act 1861. (Note: Harbours and Passing Tolls, &c. Act 1861 (24 & 25 Vict. c. 47))
Towcester Rural District Council (Abthorpe Rating) Act 1954	2 & 3 Eliz. 2. c. v	14 April 1954
An Act to abolish certain privileges in respect of rating in the Parish of Abthorpe in the Rural District of Towcester; and for other purposes.
Wear Navigation and Sunderland Dock Act 1954	2 & 3 Eliz. 2. c. vi	14 April 1954
An Act to confer further powers upon the River Wear Commissioners; and for other purposes.
Institution of Mechanical Engineers Act 1954	2 & 3 Eliz. 2. c. vii	14 April 1954
An Act for the removal of doubts as to the validity of the amalgamation of The Institution of Automobile Engineers with The Institution of Mechanical Engineers and as to the validity of an increase of the subscriptions payable to The Institution of Mechanical Engineers; and for other purposes.
Swinton and Worsley Burial Board Act 1954	2 & 3 Eliz. 2. c. viii	13 May 1954
An Act to constitute a joint Board comprising representatives of the Mayor Aldermen and Burgesses of the Borough of Swinton and Pendlebury and the Urban District Council of Worsley; to transfer to and vest in the Board the property rights and liabilities of the Burial Board for the parish of Saint Peter Swinton and to dissolve that Board; to authorise the Board to provide and maintain cemeteries and a crematorium; and for other purposes.
Dundee Corporation (Water, Transport, Finance, &c.) Order Confirmation Act 1954 (repealed)	2 & 3 Eliz. 2. c. ix	4 June 1954
An Act to confirm a Provisional Order under the Private Legislation Procedure (Scotland) Act, 1936, (Note: Private Legislation Procedure (Scotland) Act 1936 (26 Geo. 5 & 1 Edw. 8. c. 52)) relating to Dundee Corporation (Water Transport Finance &c.). (Repealed by Dundee Corporation (Consolidated Powers) Order Confirmation Act 1957 (6 & 7 Eliz. 2. c. iv))
	Dundee Corporation (Water, Transport Finance, &c.) Order 1954	
Forth Road Bridge Order Confirmation Act 1954 (repealed)	2 & 3 Eliz. 2. c. x	4 June 1954
An Act to confirm a Provisional Order under the Private Legislation Procedure (Scotland) Act, 1936, relating to the Forth Road Bridge. (Repealed by Forth Estuary Transport Authority Order 2002 (SSI 2002/178))
	Forth Road Bridge Order 1954	
Glasgow Corporation Order Confirmation Act 1954	2 & 3 Eliz. 2. c. xi	4 June 1954
An Act to confirm a Provisional Order under the Private Legislation Procedure (Scotland) Act, 1936, relating to Glasgow Corporation.
	Glasgow Corporation Order 1954	
Rutherglen Burgh Order Confirmation Act 1954	2 & 3 Eliz. 2. c. xii	4 June 1954
An Act to confirm a Provisional Order under the Private Legislation Procedure (Scotland) Act, 1936, relating to Rutherglen Burgh.
	Rutherglen Burgh Order 1954	
Metropolitan Common Scheme (Ham) Amending Scheme Confirmation Act 1954	2 & 3 Eliz. 2. c. xiii	4 June 1954
An Act to confirm a Scheme for amending a Scheme under the Metropolitan Commons Acts, 1866 to 1898, with respect to Ham Common in the County of Surrey.
	Ham Common (Amending) Scheme	
Crewe Corporation Act 1954	2 & 3 Eliz. 2. c. xiv	4 June 1954
An Act to extend the time for the compulsory acquisition of certain lands by the Mayor Aldermen and Burgesses of the Borough of Crewe under the Crewe Corporation Act 1938; (Note: Crewe Corporation Act 1938 (1 & 2 Geo. 6. c. xxx)) and for other purposes.
Falmouth Docks Act 1954 (repealed)	2 & 3 Eliz. 2. c. xv	4 June 1954
An Act to extend the time for the construction of a new quay by the Falmouth Docks and Engineering Company; and for other purposes. (Repealed by Falmouth Docks Act 1959 (7 & 8 Eliz. 2. c. xl))
Rhodesian Selection Trust Limited and Associated Companies Act 1954	2 & 3 Eliz. 2. c. xvi	4 June 1954
An Act to provide for the transfer to Northern Rhodesia of the registration of Rhodesian Selection Trust Limited Mufulira Copper Mines Limited and Roan Antelope Copper Mines Limited; to apply to those Companies the provisions of the Companies Ordinance of the said Territory in place of certain provisions of the Companies Act 1948; (Note: Companies Act 1948 (11 & 12 Geo. 6. c. 38)) and for other purposes.
Wankie Colliery Act 1954	2 & 3 Eliz. 2. c. xvii	4 June 1954
An Act to provide for the transfer to Southern Rhodesia of the registration of the Wankie Colliery Company Limited; to apply to the Company the provisions of the Companies Act 1951 (Note: Companies Act, 1951 (No. 47 (Southern Rhodesia))) of the said Territory in place of certain provisions of the Companies Act 1948; and for other purposes.
Ashridge (Bonar Law Memorial) Trust Act 1954	2 & 3 Eliz. 2. c. xviii	4 June 1954
An Act to provide for the administration of the Ashridge (Bonar Law Memorial) Trust as an educational charity; to incorporate the governors thereof; and for other purposes.
Caernarvon Corporation Act 1954	2 & 3 Eliz. 2. c. xix	4 June 1954
An Act to empower the Mayor Aldermen and Burgesses of the borough of Caernarvon to discontinue the ferry between Caernarvon and Anglesey; to authorise the Corporation to widen and improve the Swing Bridge over the River Seiont to make a road widening in connection therewith and to purchase lands compulsorily for those purposes; to confer further powers on the Corporation in relation to the said bridge and to the charging of tolls; and for other purposes.
Tyne Improvement Act 1954	2 & 3 Eliz. 2. c. xx	4 June 1954
An Act to empower the Tyne Improvement Commissioners to abandon the Direct Ferry and to borrow further money and for other purposes.
Edinburgh Corporation Order Confirmation Act 1954 (repealed)	2 & 3 Eliz. 2. c. xxi	5 July 1954
An Act to confirm a Provisional Order under the Private Legislation Procedure (Scotland) Act, 1936, relating to Edinburgh Corporation. (Repealed by Edinburgh Corporation Order Confirmation Act 1962 (11 & 12 Eliz. 2. c. ii))
	Edinburgh Corporation Order 1954	
Ferguson Bequest Fund Order Confirmation Act 1954	2 & 3 Eliz. 2. c. xxii	5 July 1954
An Act to confirm a Provisional Order under the Private Legislation Procedure (Scotland) Act, 1936, relating to the Ferguson Bequest Fund.
	Ferguson Bequest Fund Order 1954	
Dunoon Burgh Order Confirmation Act 1954	2 & 3 Eliz. 2. c. xxiii	5 July 1954
An Act to confirm a Provisional Order under the Private Legislation Procedure (Scotland) Act, 1936, relating to Dunoon Burgh.
	Dunoon Burgh Order 1954	
London County Council (General Powers) Act 1954	2 & 3 Eliz. 2. c. xxiv	5 July 1954
An Act to confer further powers upon the London County Council and other authorities; and for other purposes/
Newcastle-upon-Tyne Corporation Act 1954 (repealed)	2 & 3 Eliz. 2. c. xxv	5 July 1954
An Act to confer further powers upon the Lord Mayor Aldermen and Citizens of the City and County of Newcastle upon Tyne and the Stewards and Wardens Committee of the Town Moor in the city with regard to the closing of parts of the Town Moor for agricultural shows; to enact provisions as to the number of standing passengers which may be carried on trolley vehicles of the Corporation; and for other purposes. (Repealed by Newcastle-upon-Tyne Moor Act 1988 (c. xxxi))
Tees Conservancy Act 1954	2 & 3 Eliz. 2. c. xxvi	5 July 1954
An Act to extend the time for the completion by the Tees Conservancy Commissioners of certain works; to alter the constitution of the Commissioners; and for other purposes.
City of London (Various Powers) Act 1954	2 & 3 Eliz. 2. c. xxvii	5 July 1954
An Act to enact provisions with respect to smoke abatement streets and local government in the City of London; to make further provision with respect to superannuation; and for other purposes.
London County Council (Money) Act 1954 (repealed)	2 & 3 Eliz. 2. c. xxviii	5 July 1954
An Act to regulate the expenditure on capital account and lending of money by the London County Council during the financial period from the first day of April nineteen hundred and fifty-four to the thirtieth day of September nineteen hundred and fifty-five; and for other purposes. (Repealed by London County Council (Loans) Act 1955 (4 & 5 Eliz. 2. c. xxvi))
Post Office (Site and Railway) Act 1954	2 & 3 Eliz. 2. c. xxix	30 July 1954
An Act to enable the Postmaster-General to acquire lands in London for the purposes of the Post Office and to construct for those purposes certain underground railway works in London, and for purposes connected with the matters aforesaid.
British Transport Commission Order Confirmation Act 1954	2 & 3 Eliz. 2. c. xxx	30 July 1954
An Act to confirm a Provisional Order under the Private Legislation Procedure (Scotland) Act, 1936, relating to the British Transport Commission.
	British Transport Commission Order 1954	
Pier and Harbour Order (Brighton) Confirmation Act 1954 (repealed)	2 & 3 Eliz. 2. c. xxxi	30 July 1954
An Act to confirm a Provisional Order made by the Minister of Transport and Civil Aviation under the General Pier and Harbour Act, 1861, (Note: General Pier and Harbour Act 1861 (24 & 25 Vict. c. 45)) relating to Brighton. (Repealed by Brighton West Pier Harbour Revision Order 2007 (SI 2007/1423))
Pier and Harbour Order (Cowes) Confirmation Act 1954	2 & 3 Eliz. 2. c. xxxii	30 July 1954
An Act to confirm a Provisional Order made by the Minister of Transport and Civil Aviation under the General Pier and Harbour Act, 1861, relating to Cowes.
	Cowes Harbour Order 1954	
Pier and Harbour Order (Llanelly) Confirmation Act 1954	2 & 3 Eliz. 2. c. xxxiii	30 July 1954
An Act to confirm a Provisional Order made by the Minister of Transport and Civil Aviation under the General Pier and Harbour Act, 1861, relating to Llanelly.
	Llanelly Harbour Order 1954	
Pier and Harbour Order (Salcombe) Confirmation Act 1954	2 & 3 Eliz. 2. c. xxxiv	30 July 1954
An Act to confirm a Provisional Order made by the Minister of Transport and Civil Aviation under the General Pier and Harbour Act, 1861, relating to Salcombe.
	Salcombe Harbour Order 1954	
Pier and Harbour Order (Whitehaven) Confirmation Act 1954	2 & 3 Eliz. 2. c. xxxv	30 July 1954
An Act to confirm a Provisional Order made by the Minister of Transport and Civil Aviation under the General Pier and Harbour Act, 1861, relating to Whitehaven.
	Whitehaven Harbour Order 1954	
Pier and Harbour Order (Newport (Isle of Wight)) Confirmation Act 1954 (repealed)	2 & 3 Eliz. 2. c. xxxvi	30 July 1954
An Act to confirm a Provisional Order made by the Minister of Transport and Civil Aviation under the General Pier and Harbour Act, 1861, relating to Newport (Isle of Wight). (Repealed by Newport (Isle of Wight) Harbour Revision Order 1988 (SI 1988/2304))
	Newport (Isle of Wight) Order 1954	
Bradford Corporation (Trolley Vehicles) Order Confirmation Act 1954 (repealed)	2 & 3 Eliz. 2. c. xxxvii	30 July 1954
An Act to confirm a Provisional Order made by the Minister of Transport and Civil Aviation under the Bradford Corporation Act, 1910, (Note: Bradford Corporation Act 1910 (10 Edw. 7 & 1 Geo. 5. c. cxvii)) relating to Bradford Corporation trolley vehicles. (Repealed by West Yorkshire Act 1980 (c. xiv))
	Bradford Corporation (Trolley Vehicles) Order 1954	
Wolverhampton Corporation (Trolley Vehicles) Order Confirmation Act 1954 (repealed)	2 & 3 Eliz. 2. c. xxxviii	30 July 1954
An Act to confirm a Provisional Order made by the Minister of Transport and Civil Aviation under the Wolverhampton Corporation Act, 1925, (Note: Wolverhampton Corporation Act 1925 (15 & 16 Geo. 5. c. cxxiii)) relating to Wolverhampton Corporation trolley vehicles. (Repealed by Wolverhampton Corporation Act 1969 (c. lx))
	Wolverhampton Corporation (Trolley Vehicles) Order 1954	
Royal Warehousemen Clerks and Drapers' Schools Act 1954 or the Royal Russell School Act 1954	2 & 3 Eliz. 2. c. xxxix	30 July 1954
An Act to incorporate and confer powers upon the Institution called "The Royal Warehousemen Clerks and Drapers' Schools"; and for other purposes.
Tees Conservancy (Deposit of Dredged Material) Act 1954 (repealed)	2 & 3 Eliz. 2. c. xl	30 July 1954
An Act to make provision with respect to the deposit of material by the Tees Conservancy Commissioners; and for other purposes. (Repealed by Tees and Hartlepools Port Authority Act 1966 (c. xxv))
London County Council (Holland House) Amendment Act 1954	2 & 3 Eliz. 2. c. xli	30 July 1954
An Act to amend the London County Council (Holland House) Act 1952. (Note: London County Council (Holland House) Act 1952 (15 & 16 Geo. 6 & 1 Eliz. 2. c. v))
Wesleyan and General Assurance Society Act 1954 (repealed)	2 & 3 Eliz. 2. c. xlii	30 July 1954
An Act to amend the Wesleyan and General Assurance Society Act 1914 (Note: Wesleyan and General Assurance Society Act 1914 (4 & 5 Geo. 5. c. clxvii)) and the Rules of the Society; and for other purposes. (Repealed by Wesleyan Assurance Society Act 1989 (c. viii))
Walsall Corporation Act 1954 (repealed)	2 & 3 Eliz. 2. c. xliii	30 July 1954
An Act to authorise the Mayor Aldermen and Burgesses of the Borough of Walsall to provide and work trolley vehicles on further routes, and to make further provision with regard to the transport undertaking of the Corporation; to authorise the Corporation to purchase lands compulsorily; to make further provision for the health local government improvement and finances of the borough; and for other purposes. (Repealed by Walsall Corporation Act 1969 (c. lviii))
Birmingham Corporation Act 1954	2 & 3 Eliz. 2. c. xliv	30 July 1954
An Act to authorise the. Lord Mayor Aldermen and Citizens of the city of Birmingham to construct a subway in the city; to make further provision in reference to lands; to make further provision in reference to the improvement health local government and finances of the city; and for other purposes.
Mersey Docks and Harbour Board Act 1954	2 & 3 Eliz. 2. c. xlv	30 July 1954
An Act to re-enact with amendments the powers of the Mersey Docks and Harbour Board for the removal of wrecks and other obstructions and for other purposes.
Orpington Urban District Council Act 1954	2 & 3 Eliz. 2. c. xlvi	30 July 1954
An Act to confer further powers on the Urban District Council of Orpington in regard to lands and, streets; to make further and better provision for the health local government finance and improvement of the urban district of the said Council; and for other purposes.
Birkenhead Corporation Act 1954	2 & 3 Eliz. 2. c. xlvii	30 July 1954
An Act to provide for the transfer of the undertaking of the Burial Board for the Parish of Bebington in the County of Chester to the Mayor Aldermen and Burgesses of the borough of Bebington; to confer further powers on the Mayor Aldermen and Burgesses of the county borough of Birkenhead with reference to their transport ferry water and markets undertakings and with reference to lands and streets and the local government health improvement and finances of the borough; to enact provisions with reference to hairdressers' and barbers' premises and public entertainments; and for other purposes.
Manchester Corporation Act 1954	2 & 3 Eliz. 2. c. xlviii	30 July 1954
An Act to make further provision with respect to the water undertaking of the Lord Mayor Aldermen and Citizens of the City of Manchester; to revive certain powers for the acquisition of lands and to confer further powers on the Corporation with regard to lands; to make further provision in reference to the Manchester (Ringway) Airport of the Corporation and the transport and markets undertakings of the Corporation and for the improvement health local government and finances of the City; and for other purposes.
Derbyshire County Council Act 1954	2 & 3 Eliz. 2. c. xlix	30 July 1954
An Act to confer further powers on the Derbyshire County Council and local authorities in the county of Derby in relation to lands and highways and the local government improvement health and finances of the county; and for other purposes.
Stroudwater Navigation Act 1954	2 & 3 Eliz. 2. c. l	30 July 1954
An Act to authorise the closing for navigation of the Stroudwater Navigation; to provide for the transfer of part of the Navigation to the British Transport Commission; to amend the Acts relating to the Company of Proprietors of the Stroudwater Navigation; and for other purposes.
Hartlepool Port and Harbour Act 1954	2 & 3 Eliz. 2. c. li	30 July 1954
An Act to authorise the Hartlepool Port and Harbour Commissioners to borrow further money; and for other purposes.
Newport (Monmouthshire) Corporation Act 1954	2 & 3 Eliz. 2. c. lii	30 July 1954
An Act to extend the boundaries of the county borough of Newport to make further provision with respect to the improvement health and local government of the county borough and for other purposes.
Brighton Corporation Act 1954	2 & 3 Eliz. 2. c. liii	30 July 1954
An Act to make provision with respect to the registration of premises in the county borough of Brighton used for the conduct of sales by auction to empower the Brighton Extra-mural Cemetery Company Limited to transfer and the mayor aldermen and burgesses of the said borough to purchase the undertaking of the said company to make further provision with respect to the health local government improvement and finances of the borough and for other purposes.
Coventry Corporation Act 1954	2 & 3 Eliz. 2. c. liv	30 July 1954
An Act to confer further powers upon the lord mayor aldermen and citizens of the city of Coventry with regard to their markets undertaking to make further provision in reference to the improvement health local government and finances of the city and for other purposes.
British Transport Commission Act 1954	2 & 3 Eliz. 2. c. lv	30 July 1954
An Act to empower the British Transport Commission to construct works and to acquire lands to authorise the closing for navigation of portions of certain inland waterways (Note: The Monmouthshire Canal (section within Cwmbran), the Walsall Canal (Danks branch and Gospel Oak branch), the Wyrley and Essington Canal (Sneyd Junction to Wyrley Bank branch, the Wyrley Bank branch, the Sneyd branch, the Hayhead branch, the Lord Hayes branch, and Ogley locks), the Birmingham Canal (Birmingham Level: Izon Old Turn, part of Wednesbury Old Canal, Jesson branch, Roway branch Union branch, part of Dixon's branch; Wolverhampton Level: Oldbury Old Canal; Two Locks Line), and the Titford Canal (part of Causeway Green branch).) to extend the time for the compulsory purchase of certain lands to confer further powers on the Commission to dissolve the Norwich Omnibus Company and for other purposes.
Bank of Scotland Order Confirmation Act 1954	2 & 3 Eliz. 2. c. lvi	25 November 1954
An Act to confirm a Provisional Order under the Private Legislation Procedure (Scotland) Act 1936 relating to the Bank of Scotland.
	Bank of Scotland Order 1954 Provisional Order to provide for the transfer to the Governor and Company of the Bank of Scotland Limited to authorise the Governor and Company of the Bank of Scotland to increase their capital and for other purposes.	
Churches and Universities (Scotland) Widows' and Orphans' Fund Order Confirmation Act 1954	2 & 3 Eliz. 2. c. lvii	25 November 1954
An Act to confirm a Provisional Order under the Private Legislation Procedure (Scotland) Act 1936 relating to the Churches and Universities (Scotland) Widows' and Orphans' Fund.
	Churches and Universities (Scotland) Widows' and Orphans' Fund Order 1954 Provisional Order to reincorporate the Trustees of the Churches and Universities (Scotland) Widow's and Orphans' Fund and to make provision as to the payments to be made and annuities payable out of the said fund and for other purposes.	

=== Private and personal acts ===
Short title	Citation	Royal assent
Long title
Shrewsbury Estate Act 1954	2 & 3 Eliz. 2. c. 1 Pr.	4 June 1954
An Act for enabling the settled estates of the Earl of Shrewsbury to be disentailed and to enable capital moneys to be raised out of the said settled estates and for other purposes connected with those estates.
Beit Trust Act 1954	2 & 3 Eliz. 2. c. 2 Pr.	30 July 1954
An Act to incorporate the trustees in the will of the late Alfred Beit called the railway trustees and for other purposes.

=== Sources ===
- The Public General Acts and Church Assembly Measures of 1954. London: Her Majesty's Stationery Office. 1954. pp. 1–1179 – via Google Books.
- The Public General Acts and Church Assembly Measures of 1954. London: Her Majesty's Stationery Office. 1954. pp. 1–1179 – via Google Books.
- The Journals of the House of Commons (PDF). Vol. 209 (November 1953 – November 1954). pp. 3–374 – via parliament.uk.
- Chronological Table of the Statutes: Covering the Period from 1235 to the End of 1971. London: Her Majesty's Stationery Office. 1972. pp. 1080–1092. ISBN 978-0-11-840096-1 – via Google Books.
- "UK Public General Acts from 1954". legislation.gov.uk. The National Archives.
- "UK Local Acts from 1954". legislation.gov.uk. The National Archives.
- "UK Private and Personal Acts from 1954". legislation.gov.uk. The National Archives.
- "Chronological Tables of Local Acts: Part 177 (1952-1954)". legislation.gov.uk. The National Archives.
- "Chronological Tables of the Private and Personal Acts: Part 33 (1910-1987)". legislation.gov.uk. The National Archives.

== 3 & 4 Eliz. 2 ==
The fourth session of the 40th Parliament of the United Kingdom, which met from 30 November 1954 until 6 May 1955.

=== Public general acts ===
Short title	Citation	Royal assent
Long title
National Insurance Act 1954 (repealed)	3 & 4 Eliz. 2. c. 1	22 December 1954
An Act to increase contributions and benefit under the National Insurance (Industrial Injuries) Acts, 1946 to 1953, and the National Insurance Acts, 1946 to 1953, and for purposes connected with the matters aforesaid. (Repealed by National Insurance Act 1960 (9 & 10 Eliz. 2. c. 5))
Wireless Telegraphy (Validation of Charges) Act 1954 (repealed)	3 & 4 Eliz. 2. c. 2	22 December 1954
An Act to validate certain charges in respect of licences under the Wireless Telegraphy Acts, 1904 to 1926, and for purposes connected with the matter aforesaid. (Repealed by Statute Law (Repeals) Act 1973 (c. 39))

=== Local acts ===
Short title	Citation	Royal assent
Long title
Dunoon Burgh (Pavilion Expenditure) Order Confirmation Act 1954 (repealed)	3 & 4 Eliz. 2. c. i	22 December 1954
An Act to confirm a Provisional Order under the Private Legislation Procedure (Scotland) Act 1936 (Note: Private Legislation Procedure (Scotland) Act 1936 (26 Geo. 5 & 1 Edw. 8. c. 52)) relating to Dunoon Burgh (Pavilion Expenditure). (Repealed by Statute Law (Repeals) Act 1998 (c. 43))
	Dunoon Burgh (Pavilion Expenditure) Order 1954 Provisional Order to provide for the removal of the restriction on the amount which may be defrayed out of the burgh rate for and in connection with the provision of halls and other buildings for public meetings and assemblies, a theatre concert hall dance hall or other premises suitable for the giving of entertainments or the holding of dances.	

=== Sources ===
- The Public General Acts and Church Assembly Measures of 1954. London: Her Majesty's Stationery Office. 1954. pp. 1180–1198 – via Google Books.
- The Public General Acts and Church Assembly Measures of 1954. London: Her Majesty's Stationery Office. 1954. pp. 1180–1198 – via Google Books.
- The Journals of the House of Commons (PDF). Vol. 210 (November 1954 – May 1955). pp. 3–159 – via parliament.uk.
- Chronological Table of the Statutes: Covering the Period from 1235 to the End of 1971. London: Her Majesty's Stationery Office. 1972. p. 1092. ISBN 978-0-11-840096-1 – via Google Books.
- "UK Public General Acts from 1954". legislation.gov.uk. The National Archives.
- "UK Local Acts from 1954". legislation.gov.uk. The National Archives.
- "Chronological Tables of Local Acts: Part 178 (1954-1956)". legislation.gov.uk. The National Archives.

== See also ==
- List of acts of the Parliament of the United Kingdom
