= Buffaloe v. Hart =

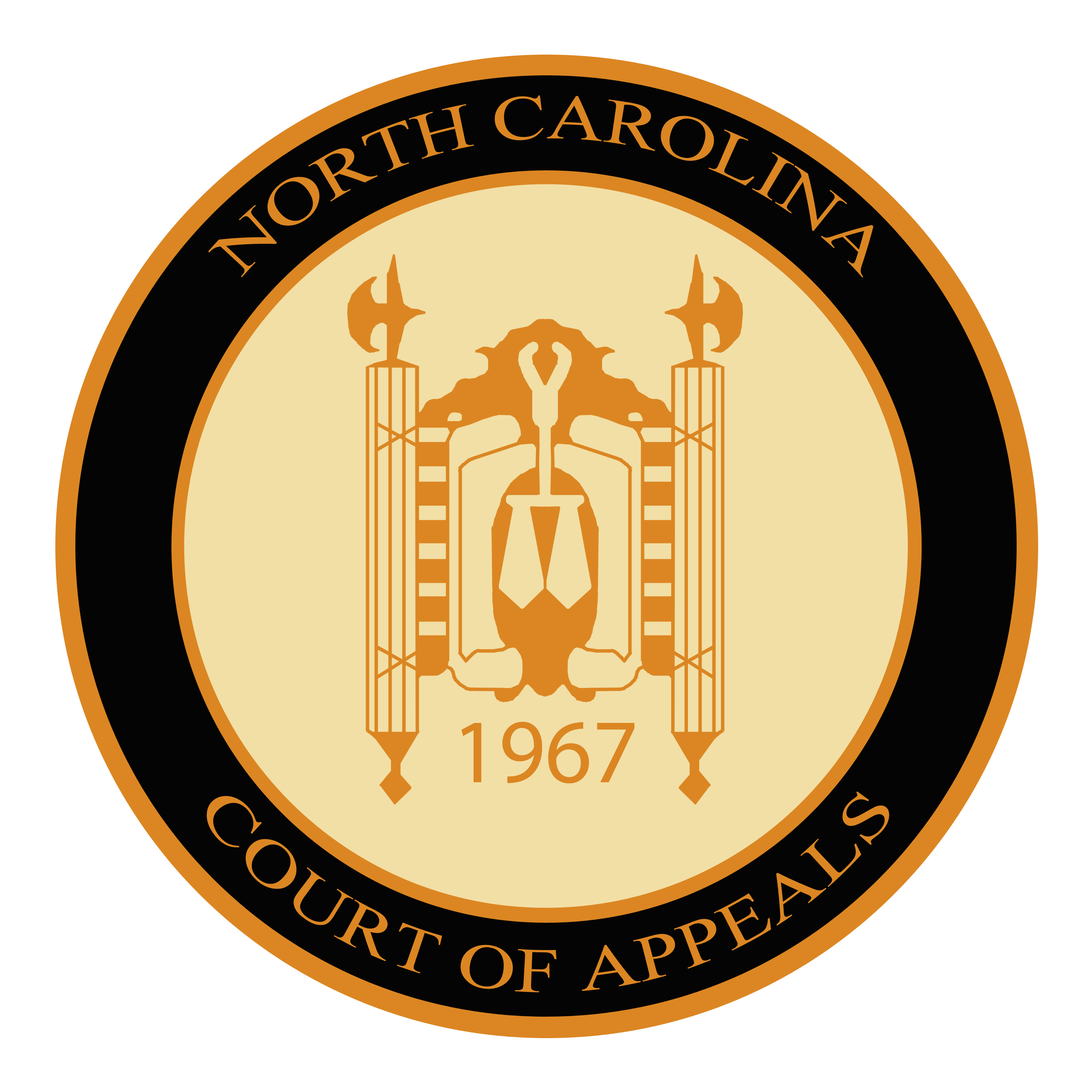
- Court: North Carolina Court of Appeals
- Full case name: Homer Buffaloe v. Patricia Hart and Lowell Thomas HART
- Submitted: February 4, 1994
- Decided: March 15, 1994
- Citation: 114 N.C. App. 52, 441 S.E.2d 172, 1994 N.C. App. LEXIS 267

Holding
- affirmed a judgment

Court membership
- Judges sitting: K. Edward Greene, Jack Cozort and Robert F. Orr

Case opinions
- Majority: K. Edward Greene, joined by unanimous

Buffaloe v. Hart, 114 N.C. App. 52 (1994) was a North Carolina Court of Appeals case dealing with a breach of contract.

== Background ==
Homer Buffaloe verbally agreed to buy five tobacco barns in Franklin County from Lowell Thomas Hart and Patricia Hart. Buffaloe had previously rented the barns based on verbal agreements. Both parties agreed to sell the barns in four annual installments based on a handshake deal without any written documentation. Buffaloe sent them a personal check with the purpose written in the subject line but they sent it back to him as they had found a buyer willing to pay more. Buffaloe sued for breach of contract.

== Decision ==
According to Buffaloe, part performance on one party's behalf can trump the statute of frauds requirements outlined in the Uniform Commercial Code which requires the contract be in writing. In contract law, the sale of goods exceeding $500 is governed by the UCC. Additionally, the UCC calls for a written agreement to accompany the sale of goods in certain instances.

The jury decided in favor of Homer Buffaloe.
