= Petroleum Royalties (Relief) and Continental Shelf Act 1989 =

Act of the Parliament of the United Kingdom

Petroleum Royalties (Relief) and Continental Shelf Act 1989 (Note: Section 4(1).)
- Act of Parliament
- Parliament of the United Kingdom
- Long title: An Act to confer on holders of certain petroleum licences an exemption from royalties (including royalties in kind) in respect of petroleum from certain onshore and offshore fields and to confer power to amend the Continental Shelf (Designation of Additional Areas) Order 1974 to give effect to an Agreement made between Her Majesty’s Government in the United Kingdom and the Government of the Republic of Ireland relating to their respective rights in relation to the continental shelf.
- Citation: 1989 c. 1
- Introduced by: The Minister of State, Department of Energy (Mr. Peter Morrison), Second Reading, 30 November 1988 Vol 142 (Commons)
- Territorial extent: England and Wales; Scotland; Northern Ireland (sections 3 and 4 and the schedule); (Note: Section 4(2).)

Dates
- Royal assent: 7 February 1989
- Commencement: 7 February 1989 (Note: Section 4(b) of the Interpretation Act 1978.)

Other legislation
- Amends: Petroleum Royalties (Relief) Act 1983
- Amended by: Continental Shelf Act 1989; Petroleum Act 1998
- Relates to: Petroleum (Production) Act 1934; Continental Shelf (Designation of Additional Areas) Order 1974; Petroleum (Production) (Seaward Areas) Regulations 1988

Status: Amended

Text of statute as originally enacted

Revised text of statute as amended

Text of the Petroleum Royalties (Relief) and Continental Shelf Act 1989 as in force today (including any amendments) within the United Kingdom, from legislation.gov.uk.

The Petroleum Royalties (Relief) and Continental Shelf Act 1989 (c. 1) is an act of the Parliament of the United Kingdom which abolished petroleum royalties for gas fields in the southern basin of the North Sea and onshore, and enacted an agreement with the Republic of Ireland on the extent of the continental shelf.

== Background ==
The act had two purposes, firstly to end royalties for new fields in the southern basin of the North Sea as well as onshore. This implemented a commitment made by the Government in the 1988 Budget statement. Secondly, it implemented the agreement that the United Kingdom Government had reached with the Republic of Ireland on the determination of the continental shelf.

The Government's policy was to keep the North Sea fiscal regime under review and to make changes where appropriate to ensure that the right climate existed for further exploration and development. There were a number of significant gas prospects in the southern basin of the North Sea which were economic before tax but uneconomic in the then current fiscal regime. For example, in early 1988 Hamilton Brothers had announced, directly as a result of the Government's intention to abolish royalties in the southern basin, to develop the Ravenspurn North field. The development represented an investment of £600 million in 1.5 trillion cubic feet of gas reserves which would not otherwise have taken place.

The act also ended royalties for new onshore fields to encourage onshore development.

Section 1 exempted new fields in the southern basin and onshore from royalties as from 1 July 1988. Section 2 ensured that the exemption granted for new fields in the North Sea applied to subsequent licences.

The act's second purpose enabled the United Kingdom to implement the agreement negotiated with the Irish Republic on the delimitation of the continental shelf. The agreement resolved an issue which has been outstanding since the enactment of the Continental Shelf Act 1964. The Government had powers to designate areas for offshore activity on the UK continental shelf, but not powers to de-designate. There were areas off the west coast of Scotland which had been claimed by both sides. After negotiation, it was agreed that the Republic of Ireland should give up some of its claim and so would the UK. However, the UK did not have the necessary powers, this was dealt with in Section 3.

== Provisions ==
The act received Royal Assent on 7 February 1989. Its long title is: ‘An Act to confer on holders of certain petroleum licences an exemption from royalties (including royalties in kind) in respect of petroleum from certain onshore and offshore fields and to confer power to amend the Continental Shelf (Designation of Additional Areas) Order 1974 to give effect to an Agreement made between Her Majesty’s Government in the United Kingdom and the Government of the Republic of Ireland relating to their respective rights in relation to the continental shelf.’

The act comprises three substantive sections and a schedule.

- Petroleum Royalties Relief
  - Section 1. Royalty exemption for petroleum from certain Southern Basin and landward areas
  - Section 2. Extension of royalty exemption for petroleum from certain new offshore fields
- Continental Shelf
  - Section 3. Power to amend designation order relating to continental shelf between the United Kingdom and the Republic of Ireland
- Supplementary
  - Section 4. Short title and extent
- Schedule: Licences to which Section 1 applies.

== Subsequent legislation ==
The act was subject to minor amendments by the Continental Shelf Act 1989 and by the Petroleum Act 1998.

== See also ==
- Oil and gas industry in the United Kingdom
- North Sea Oil
- Petroleum Act
