= List of acts of the Parliament of the United Kingdom from 1989 =

This is a list of acts of the Parliament of the United Kingdom passed in 1989.

Acts passed since 1963 are cited by calendar year, as opposed to the convention used for earlier acts of citing the regnal year(s) in which the relevant parliamentary session was held. Each act passed in a respective year is given a chapter number (abbreviated "c."), denoted by Arabic numerals in the case of public general acts, lowercase Roman numerals in the case of local acts, or italicised Arabic numerals in the case of personal acts. These run as separate series.

65 acts of Parliament were passed in 1989: 46 public general acts and 19 local acts.

indicates that an act has been transcribed on Wikisource, indicates that an act is available to view at legislation.gov.uk, and indicates the location of the original act in the Parliamentary Archives.

== Public general acts ==
Short title	Citation	Royal assent
Long title
Petroleum Royalties (Relief) and Continental Shelf Act 1989	1989 c. 1	7 February 1989
An Act to confer on holders of certain petroleum licences an exemption from royalties (including royalties in kind) in respect of petroleum from certain onshore and offshore fields and to confer power to amend the Continental Shelf (Designation of Additional Areas) Order 1974 (Note: Continental Shelf (Designation of Additional Areas) Order 1974 (SI 1974/1489)) to give effect to an Agreement made between Her Majesty's Government in the United Kingdom and the Government of the Republic of Ireland relating to their respective rights in relation to the continental shelf.
Consolidated Fund Act 1989	1989 c. 2	15 March 1989
An Act to apply certain sums out of the Consolidated Fund to the service of the years ending on 31st March 1988 and 1989.
Elected Authorities (Northern Ireland) Act 1989	1989 c. 3	15 March 1989
An Act to amend the law relating to the franchise at elections to district councils in Northern Ireland, to make provision in relation to a declaration against terrorism to be made by candidates at such elections and at elections to the Northern Ireland Assembly and by persons co-opted as members of district councils, to amend sections 3 and 4 of the Local Government Act (Northern Ireland) 1972, (Note: Local Government Act (Northern Ireland) 1972 (c. 9 (N.I.))) and for connected purposes.
Prevention of Terrorism (Temporary Provisions) Act 1989 (repealed)	1989 c. 4	15 March 1989
An Act to make provision in place of the Prevention of Terrorism (Temporary Provisions) Act 1984; (Note: Prevention of Terrorism (Temporary Provisions) Act 1984 (c. 8)) to make further provision in relation to powers of search under, and persons convicted of scheduled offences within the meaning of, the Northern Ireland (Emergency Provisions) Act 1978; (Note: Northern Ireland (Emergency Provisions) Act 1978 (c. 5)) and to enable the Secretary of State to prevent the establishment of new explosives factories, magazines and stores in Northern Ireland. (Repealed by Terrorism Act 2000 (c. 11))
Security Service Act 1989	1989 c. 5	27 April 1989
An Act to place the Security Service on a statutory basis; to enable certain actions to be taken on the authority of warrants issued by the Secretary of State, with provision for the issue of such warrants to be kept under review by a Commissioner; to establish a procedure for the investigation by a Tribunal or, in some cases, by the Commissioner of complaints about the Service; and for connected purposes.
Official Secrets Act 1989	1989 c. 6	11 May 1989
An Act to replace section 2 of the Official Secrets Act 1911 (Note: Official Secrets Act 1911 (1 & 2 Geo. 5. c. 28)) by provisions protecting more limited classes of official information.
Atomic Energy Act 1989	1989 c. 7	25 May 1989
An Act to alter the financial limit imposed by section 2(1) of the Nuclear Industry (Finance) Act 1977 (Note: Nuclear Industry (Finance) Act 1977 (c. 7)) in relation to British Nuclear Fuels plc; to make provision with respect to the recovery of certain expenses by the Health and Safety Executive; to amend sections 18 and 19 of the Nuclear Installations Act 1965; (Note: Nuclear Installations Act 1965 (c. 57)) to make provision in connection with the Convention on Assistance in the Case of a Nuclear Accident or Radiological Emergency; (Note: Convention on Assistance in the Case of a Nuclear Accident or Radiological Emergency) and for connected purposes.
National Maritime Museum Act 1989	1989 c. 8	25 May 1989
An Act to transfer land to the Trustees of the National Maritime Museum; to make further provision with respect to the functions of those Trustees; and for purposes connected therewith.
Civil Aviation (Air Navigation Charges) Act 1989 (repealed)	1989 c. 9	25 May 1989
An Act to enable charges imposed under section 73(1)(a) of the Civil Aviation Act 1982 (Note: Civil Aviation Act 1982 (c. 16)) to be prescribed in units of account defined by reference to more than one currency. (Repealed by Transport Act 2000 (c. 38))
Disabled Persons (Northern Ireland) Act 1989	1989 c. 10	25 May 1989
An Act to make provision equivalent to the Disabled Persons (Services, Consultation and Representation) Act 1986 (Note: Disabled Persons (Services, Consultation and Representation) Act 1986 (c. 33)) for Northern Ireland.
Police Officers (Central Service) Act 1989	1989 c. 11	3 July 1989
An Act to amend the enactments relating to central service on police duties.
Hearing Aid Council (Amendment) Act 1989 (repealed)	1989 c. 12	3 July 1989
An Act to amend the Hearing Aid Council Act 1968 (Note: Hearing Aid Council Act 1968 (c. 50)) in order to make further provision for the regulation, conduct and discipline of persons engaged in dispensing hearing aids; to amend the composition of the Hearing Aid Council; and for purposes connected with those matters. (Repealed by Health and Social Care Act 2008 (c. 14))
Dock Work Act 1989	1989 c. 13	3 July 1989
An Act to abolish the Dock Workers Employment Scheme 1967 and repeal the Dock Workers (Regulation of Employment) Act 1946; (Note: Dock Workers (Regulation of Employment) Act 1946 (9 & 10 Geo. 6. c. 22)) to make provision for the dissolution of the National Dock Labour Board; and for connected purposes.
Control of Pollution (Amendment) Act 1989	1989 c. 14	6 July 1989
An Act to provide for the registration of carriers of controlled waste and to make further provision with respect to the powers exercisable in relation to vehicles shown to have been used for illegal waste disposal.
Water Act 1989	1989 c. 15	6 July 1989
An Act to provide for the establishment and functions of a National Rivers Authority and of committees to advise that Authority; to provide for the transfer of the property, rights and liabilities of water authorities to the National Rivers Authority and to companies nominated by the Secretary of State and for the dissolution of those authorities; to provide for the appointment and functions of a Director General of Water Services and of customer service committees; to provide for companies to be appointed to be water undertakers and sewerage undertakers and for the regulation of the appointed companies; to make provision with respect to, and the finances of, the nominated companies, holding companies of the nominated companies and statutory water companies; to amend the law relating to the supply of water and the law relating to the provision of sewers and the treatment and disposal of sewage; to amend the law with respect to the pollution of water and the law with respect to its abstraction from inland waters and underground strata; to make new provision in relation to flood defence and fisheries; to transfer functions with respect to navigation, conservancy and harbours to the National Rivers Authority; and for connected purposes.
Parking Act 1989	1989 c. 16	21 July 1989
An Act to amend the Road Traffic Regulation Act 1984 (Note: Road Traffic Regulation Act 1984 (c. 27)) in relation to parking.
Control of Smoke Pollution Act 1989 (repealed)	1989 c. 17	21 July 1989
An Act to amend section 16(1)(a) of the Clean Air Act 1956 (Note: Clean Air Act 1956 (4 & 5 Eliz. 2. c. 52)) and section 1 of the Clean Air Act 1968. (Note: Clean Air Act 1968 (c. 62)) (Repealed by Clean Air Act 1993 (c. 11))
Common Land (Rectification of Registers) Act 1989 (repealed)	1989 c. 18	21 July 1989
An Act to provide for removing from the registers maintained under the Commons Registration Act 1965 (Note: Commons Registration Act 1965 (c. 64)) land on which there is a dwellinghouse or which is ancillary to a dwellinghouse and in respect of which that requirement has been satisfied at all times since 5th August 1945; and for purposes connected therewith. (Repealed by Commons Act 2006 (c. 26))
International Parliamentary Organisations (Registration) Act 1989	1989 c. 19	21 July 1989
An Act to set up a register of publicly-financed international parliamentary organisations which are in receipt of an annual grant-in-aid to fund both British and international secretariats and which draw their membership from both Houses of Parliament.
Licensing (Amendment) Act 1989	1989 c. 20	21 July 1989
An Act to amend the Licensing Act 1964. (Note: Licensing Act 1964 (c. 26))
Antarctic Minerals Act 1989	1989 c. 21	21 July 1989
An Act to make provision with respect to the exploration and exploitation of mineral resources in Antarctica; to enable proceedings with respect to matters arising under the law of the British Antarctic Territory to be brought in England and Wales; and for connected purposes.
Road Traffic (Driver Licensing and Information Systems) Act 1989	1989 c. 22	21 July 1989
An Act to amend the law relating to driving licences and to regulate the operation of systems providing drivers of motor vehicles with guidance and information derived from automatically processed data or collecting, storing and processing the data.
Transport (Scotland) Act 1989	1989 c. 23	21 July 1989
An Act to make provision for the transfer to the private sector of the operations of the Scottish Transport Group, other than its shipping operations; for the transfer of its shipping operations to the Secretary of State; to provide for the dissolution of the Group; and for connected purposes.
Social Security Act 1989	1989 c. 24	21 July 1989
An Act to amend the law relating to social security and occupational and personal pension schemes; to make provision with respect to certain employment-related benefit schemes; to provide for the recovery, out of certain compensation payments, of amounts determined by reference to payments of benefit; to make fresh provision with respect to the constitution and functions of war pensions committees; and for connected purposes.
Appropriation Act 1989	1989 c. 25	27 July 1989
An Act to apply a sum out of the Consolidated Fund to the service of the year ending on 31st March 1990, to appropriate the supplies granted in this Session of Parliament, and to repeal certain Consolidated Fund and Appropriation Acts.
Finance Act 1989	1989 c. 26	27 July 1989
An Act to grant certain duties, to alter other duties, and to amend the law relating to the National Debt and the Public Revenue, and to make further provision in connection with Finance.
Pesticides (Fees and Enforcement) Act 1989	1989 c. 27	27 July 1989
An Act to substitute new provisions for section 18 of the Food and Environment Protection Act 1985; (Note: Food and Environment Protection Act 1985 (c. 48)) to amend section 19 of that Act; and for connected purposes.
Representation of the People Act 1989	1989 c. 28	27 July 1989
An Act to amend the law relating to the entitlement of British citizens resident outside the United Kingdom to vote at parliamentary elections and elections to the European Parliament and to increase the maximum amount of candidates' election expenses at parliamentary by-elections.
Electricity Act 1989	1989 c. 29	27 July 1989
An Act to provide for the appointment and functions of a Director General of Electricity Supply and of consumers' committees for the electricity supply industry; to make new provision with respect to the supply of electricity through electric lines and the generation and transmission of electricity for such supply; to abolish the Electricity Consumers' Council and the Consultative Councils established under the Electricity Act 1947; (Note: Electricity Act 1947 (10 & 11 Geo. 6. c. 54)) to provide for the vesting of the property, rights and liabilities of the Electricity Boards and the Electricity Council in companies nominated by the Secretary of State and the subsequent dissolution of those Boards and that Council; to provide for the giving of financial assistance in connection with the storage and reprocessing of nuclear fuel, the treatment, storage and disposal of radioactive waste and the decommissioning of nuclear installations; to amend the Rights of Entry (Gas and Electricity Boards) Act 1954 (Note: Rights of Entry (Gas and Electricity Boards) Act 1954 (2 & 3 Eliz. 2. c. 21)) and the Local Government (Scotland) Act 1973; (Note: Local Government (Scotland) Act 1973 (c. 65)) and for connected purposes.
Dangerous Dogs Act 1989	1989 c. 30	27 July 1989
An Act to extend the powers available to a court on a complaint under section 2 of the Dogs Act 1871 (Note: Dogs Act 1871 (34 & 35 Vict. c. 56)) together with additional rights of appeal and enhanced penalties.
Human Organ Transplants Act 1989 (repealed)	1989 c. 31	27 July 1989
An Act to prohibit commercial dealings in human organs intended for transplanting; to restrict the transplanting of such organs between persons who are not genetically related; and for supplementary purposes connected with those matters. (Repealed for England and Wales by Human Tissue Act 2004 (c. 30) and for Scotland by Human Tissue (Scotland) Act 2006 (asp 4))
Fair Employment (Northern Ireland) Act 1989 (repealed)	1989 c. 32	27 July 1989
An Act to establish a Fair Employment Tribunal for Northern Ireland and offices of President and Vice-President of the Industrial Tribunals and the Fair Employment Tribunal; to amend the Fair Employment (Northern Ireland) Act 1976; (Note: Fair Employment (Northern Ireland) Act 1976 (c. 25)) to make further provision with respect to the promotion of equality of opportunity in employments and occupations in Northern Ireland between persons of different religious beliefs; and for connected purposes. (Repealed by Fair Employment and Treatment (Northern Ireland) Order 1998 (SI 1998/3162))
Extradition Act 1989 (repealed)	1989 c. 33	27 July 1989
An Act to consolidate enactments relating to extradition under the Criminal Justice Act 1988, (Note: Criminal Justice Act 1988 (c. 33)) the Fugitive Offenders Act 1967 (Note: Fugitive Offenders Act 1967 (c. 68)) and the Extradition Acts 1870 to 1935, with amendments to give effect to recommendations of the Law Commission and the Scottish Law Commission. (Repealed by Extradition Act 2003 (c. 41))
Law of Property (Miscellaneous Provisions) Act 1989	1989 c. 34	27 July 1989
An Act to make new provision with respect to deeds and their execution and contracts for the sale or other disposition of interests in land; and to abolish the rule of law known as the rule in Bain v. Fothergill.
Continental Shelf Act 1989	1989 c. 35	27 July 1989
An Act to amend section 3 of the Petroleum Royalties (Relief) and Continental Shelf Act 1989. (Note: Petroleum Royalties (Relief) and Continental Shelf Act 1989 (c. 1))
Brunei (Appeals) Act 1989	1989 c. 36	16 November 1989
An Act to make provision with respect to the reference of appeals from the Supreme Court of Brunei Darussalam to the Judicial Committee of the Privy Council.
Football Spectators Act 1989	1989 c. 37	16 November 1989
An Act to control the admission of spectators at designated football matches in England and Wales by means of a national membership scheme and licences to admit spectators; to provide for the safety of spectators at such matches by means of such licences and the conferment of functions on the licensing authority in relation to safety certificates for grounds at which such matches are played; and to provide for the making by courts and the enforcement of orders imposing restrictions on persons convicted of certain offences for the purpose of preventing violence or disorder at or in connection with designated football matches played outside England and Wales.
Employment Act 1989	1989 c. 38	16 November 1989
An Act to amend the Sex Discrimination Act 1975 (Note: Sex Discrimination Act 1975 (c. 65)) in pursuance of the Directive of the Council of the European Communities, dated 9th February 1976, (No. 76/207/EEC) (Note: Equal Treatment Directive (76/207/EEC)) on the implementation of the principle of equal treatment for men and women as regards access to employment, vocational training and promotion, and working conditions; to repeal or amend prohibitions or requirements relating to the employment of young persons and other categories of employees; to make other amendments of the law relating to employment and training; to repeal section 1(1)(a) of the Celluloid and Cinematograph Film Act 1922; (Note: Celluloid and Cinematograph Film Act 1922 (12 & 13 Geo. 5. c. 35)) to dissolve the Training Commission; to make further provision with respect to industrial training boards; to make provision with respect to the transfer of staff employed in the Skills Training Agency; and for connected purposes.
Self-Governing Schools etc. (Scotland) Act 1989	1989 c. 39	16 November 1989
An Act to make provision as regards the acquisition of self-governing status by certain public schools in Scotland; to make further provision as regards education in Scotland; and for connected purposes.
Companies Act 1989	1989 c. 40	16 November 1989
An Act to amend the law relating to company accounts; to make new provision with respect to the persons eligible for appointment as company auditors; to amend the Companies Act 1985 (Note: Companies Act 1985 (c. 6)) and certain other enactments with respect to investigations and powers to obtain information and to confer new powers exercisable to assist overseas regulatory authorities; to make new provision with respect to the registration of company charges and otherwise to amend the law relating to companies; to amend the Fair Trading Act 1973; (Note: Fair Trading Act 1973 (c. 41)) to enable provision to be made for the payment of fees in connection with the exercise by the Secretary of State, the Director General of Fair Trading and the Monopolies and Mergers Commission of their functions under Part V of that Act; to make provision for safeguarding the operation of certain financial markets; to amend the Financial Services Act 1986; (Note: Financial Services Act 1986 (c. 60)) to enable provision to be made for the recording and transfer of title to securities without a written instrument; to amend the Company Directors Disqualification Act 1986, (Note: Company Directors Disqualification Act 1986 (c. 46)) the Company Securities (Insider Dealing) Act 1985, (Note: Company Securities (Insider Dealing) Act 1985 (c. 8)) the Policyholders Protection Act 1975 (Note: Policyholders Protection Act 1975 (c. 75)) and the law relating to building societies; and for connected purposes.
Children Act 1989	1989 c. 41	16 November 1989
An Act to reform the law relating to children; to provide for local authority services for children in need and others; to amend the law with respect to children's homes, community homes, voluntary homes and voluntary organisations; to make provision with respect to fostering, child minding and day care for young children and adoption; and for connected purposes.
Local Government and Housing Act 1989	1989 c. 42	16 November 1989
An Act to make provision with respect to the members, officers and other staff and the procedure of local authorities; to amend Part III of the Local Government Act 1974 (Note: Local Government Act 1974 (c. 7)) and Part II of the Local Government (Scotland) Act 1975 (Note: Local Government (Scotland) Act 1975 (c. 30)) and to provide for a national code of local government conduct; to make further provision about the finances and expenditure of local authorities (including provision with respect to housing subsidies) and about companies in which local authorities have interests; to make provision for and in connection with renewal areas, grants towards the cost of improvement and repair of housing accommodation and the carrying out of works of maintenance, repair and improvement; to amend the Housing Act 1985 (Note: Housing Act 1985 (c. 68)) and Part III of the Local Government Finance Act 1982; (Note: Local Government Finance Act 1982 (c. 32)) to make amendments of and consequential upon Parts I, II and IV of the Housing Act 1988; (Note: Housing Act 1988 (c. 50)) to amend the Local Government Finance Act 1988 (Note: Local Government Finance Act 1988 (c. 41)) and the Abolition of Domestic Rates Etc. (Scotland) Act 1987 (Note: Abolition of Domestic Rates Etc. (Scotland) Act 1987 (c. 47)) and certain enactments relating, as respects Scotland, to rating and valuation, and to provide for the making of grants; to make provision with respect to the imposition of charges by local authorities; to make further provision about certain existing grants and about financial assistance to and planning by local authorities in respect of emergencies; to amend sections 102 and 211 of the Local Government (Scotland) Act 1973; (Note: Local Government (Scotland) Act 1973) to amend the Local Land Charges Act 1975; (Note: Local Land Charges Act 1975 (c. 76)) to enable local authorities in Wales to be known solely by Welsh language names; to provide for the transfer of new town housing stock; to amend certain of the provisions of the Housing (Scotland) Act 1987 (Note: Housing (Scotland) Act 1987 (c. 26)) relating to a secure tenant's right to purchase his house; to amend section 47 of the Race Relations Act 1976; (Note: Race Relations Act 1976 (c. 74)) to confer certain powers on the Housing Corporation, Housing for Wales and Scottish Homes; to make provision about security of tenure for certain tenants under long tenancies; to provide for the making of grants and giving of guarantees in respect of certain activities carried on in relation to the construction industry; to provide for the repeal of certain enactments relating to improvement notices, town development and education support grants; to make, as respects Scotland, further provision in relation to the phasing of progression to registered rent for houses let by housing associations or Scottish Homes and in relation to the circumstances in which rent increases under assured tenancies may be secured; and for connected purposes.
Statute Law (Repeals) Act 1989	1989 c. 43	16 November 1989
An Act to promote the reform of the statute law by the repeal, in accordance with recommendations of the Law Commission and the Scottish Law Commission, of certain enactments which (except in so far as their effect is preserved) are no longer of practical utility, and to make other provision in connection with the repeal of those enactments.
Opticians Act 1989	1989 c. 44	16 November 1989
An Act to consolidate certain enactments relating to opticians with amendments to give effect to recommendations of the Law Commission and the Scottish Law Commission.
Prisons (Scotland) Act 1989	1989 c. 45	16 November 1989
An Act to consolidate certain enactments relating to prisons and other institutions for offenders in Scotland and connected matters.
Consolidated Fund (No. 2) Act 1989	1989 c. 46	21 December 1989
An Act to apply certain sums out of the Consolidated Fund to the service of the years ending on 31st March 1990 and 1991.

== Local acts ==
Short title	Citation	Royal assent
Long title
Port of Tyne Act 1989	1989 c. i	7 February 1989
An Act to confer new powers upon the Port of Tyne Authority; to revise certain penalties; to facilitate the regulation of motor vehicle traffic on dock roads; and for connected or other purposes.
London Regional Transport Act 1989	1989 c. ii	7 February 1989
An Act to empower London Regional Transport to construct works and to acquire lands; to empower London Underground Limited to acquire lands; to confer further powers on London Regional Transport; and for other purposes.
British Railways Act 1989	1989 c. iii	27 April 1989
An Act to empower the British Railways Board to construct works and to purchase or use land; to extend the time for the compulsory purchase of certain land; to confer further powers on the Board; and for other purposes.
Avon Light Rail Transit Act 1989	1989 c. iv	11 May 1989
An Act to empower Advanced Transport for Avon Limited to develop and operate a system of light rail transit in the county of Avon; to authorise the construction of works and the acquisition of land for that purpose; to confer further powers upon the Company; and for other purposes.
Scrabster Harbour Order Confirmation Act 1989	1989 c. v	25 May 1989
An Act to confirm a Provisional Order under the Private Legislation Procedure (Scotland) Act 1936, (Note: Private Legislation Procedure (Scotland) Act 1936 (26 Geo. 5 & 1 Edw. 8. c. 52)) relating to Scrabster Harbour.
	Scrabster Harbour Order 1989 Provisional Order to authorise the Trustees of the Harbour of Scrabster to carry out works for the improvement of their harbour undertaking, to extend the harbour limits and to increase their power to borrow money; and for other purposes.	
Kingston upon Hull City Council Act 1989	1989 c. vi	3 July 1989
An Act to authorise go-kart racing on certain streets in the city of Kingston upon Hull; to confer powers on the Kingston upon Hull City Council in relation thereto; and for other purposes.
Tees (Newport) Bridge Act 1989	1989 c. vii	3 July 1989
An Act to remove the obligation of Cleveland County Council to provide for the opening for vessels of the Tees (Newport) bridge; and for connected and other purposes.
Wesleyan Assurance Society Act 1989	1989 c. viii	6 July 1989
An Act to repeal the Wesleyan and General Assurance Society Acts 1914 (Note: Wesleyan and General Assurance Society Act 1914 (4 & 5 Geo. 5. c. clxvii)) and 1954; (Note: Wesleyan and General Assurance Society Act 1954 (2 & 3 Eliz. 2. c. xlii)) to make new provision for the regulation and management of the Wesleyan Assurance Society; and for other purposes.
London Docklands Railway (Beckton) Act 1989	1989 c. ix	21 July 1989
An Act to empower London Regional Transport to construct works and to acquire lands; to confer further powers on London Regional Transport; and for other purposes.
Associated British Ports (Hull) Act 1989	1989 c. x	27 July 1989
An Act to empower Associated British Ports to construct works and to acquire lands at Hull; to confer further powers on Associated British Ports in connection with those works and in connection with their undertaking at Hull; and for other purposes.
London Regional Transport (No. 2) Act 1989	1989 c. xi	27 July 1989
An Act to empower London Underground Limited to construct works and to acquire lands; to confer powers on London Regional Transport; and for other purposes.
Hayle Harbour Act 1989	1989 c. xii	27 July 1989
An Act to establish The Hayle Harbour Company Limited as a harbour authority and to confer upon that company certain powers to enable them to operate Hayle harbour as a public harbour undertaking; to construct works in the harbour; and for other purposes.
Queen Mary and Westfield College Act 1989	1989 c. xiii	27 July 1989
An Act to transfer to Queen Mary and Westfield College, University of London all rights, properties, assets and obligations of Queen Mary College and Westfield College and to dissolve those colleges; to enact provisions with regard to Queen Mary and Westfield College, University of London; and for other purposes.
Tyne and Wear Passenger Transport Act 1989	1989 c. xiv	16 November 1989
An Act to empower the Tyne and Wear Passenger Transport Executive to construct works and to acquire lands for the extension of the Tyne and Wear Metro to Newcastle International Airport; and for other purposes.
Midland Metro Act 1989	1989 c. xv	16 November 1989
An Act to empower the West Midlands Passenger Transport Executive to develop and operate a light rail system of rapid passenger transport; to authorise the construction of works and the acquisition of lands for that purpose; to confer further powers upon the Executive; and for other purposes.
International Westminster Bank Act 1989	1989 c. xvi	16 November 1989
An Act to provide for the vesting in National Westminster Bank PLC of the undertaking of International Westminster Bank PLC; and for other purposes.
British Railways (Penalty Fares) Act 1989	1989 c. xvii	16 November 1989
An Act to empower the charging of a penalty fare for persons using passenger transport services under the control of the British Railways Board without a valid ticket for such use; and for related purposes.
Scottish Episcopal Clergy Widows' and Orphans' Fund Order Confirmation Act 1989 (repealed)	1989 c. xviii	21 December 1989
An Act to confirm a Provisional Order under the Private Legislation Procedure (Scotland) Act 1936, relating to Scottish Episcopal Clergy Widows' and Orphans' Fund. (Repealed by Statute Law (Repeals) Act 1998 (c. 43))
	Scottish Episcopal Clergy Widows' and Orphans' Fund Order 1989 Provisional Order to transfer the assets of the Scottish Episcopal Clergy Widows' and Orphans' Fund to the trustees of the Scottish Episcopal Church Pension Fund and for purposes incidental thereto or consequential thereon.	
South Yorkshire Light Rail Transit Act 1989	1989 c. xix	21 December 1989
An Act to empower the South Yorkshire Passenger Transport Executive to construct additional works for the extension of their LRT system in the Lower Don Valley in the City of Sheffield and the Metropolitan Borough of Rotherham and to acquire lands for that purpose; to confer further powers upon the Executive; and for other purposes.

== See also ==
- List of acts of the Parliament of the United Kingdom
