= Oral contract =

Legal concept

An oral contract is a contract, the terms of which have been agreed by spoken communication. This is in contrast to a written contract, where the contract is a written document. There may be written, or other physical evidence, of an oral contract – for example where the parties write down what they have agreed – but the contract itself is not a written one.

In general, oral contracts are just as valid as written ones, but some jurisdictions either require a contract to be in writing in certain circumstances (for example where real property is being conveyed), or that a contract be evidenced in writing (although the contract itself may be oral). An example of the latter is the requirement that a contract of guarantee be evidenced in writing, which is found in the Statute of Frauds.

Similarly, the limitation period prescribed for an action may be shorter for an oral contract than it is for a written one.

The term verbal contract is sometimes used as a synonym for oral contract. However, since the term verbal could also mean just using words, not only spoken words, the term oral contract is recommended when maximum clarity is desired.

== Enforcement ==
Provided that an oral contract satisfies any requirements imposed by law, such a requirement that contracts for a specific type of transaction be in writing, it is legally enforceable.

For example, in 1984, Getty Oil was sold to Pennzoil in a handshake deal, a lay term for an oral contract, which was binding under New York law. Texaco later made a higher offer, and the company was sold to Texaco. Pennzoil filed a lawsuit alleging tortious interference with the oral contract and, after prevailing in Pennzoil, Co. v. Texaco, Inc., was awarded $11.1 billion in damages, later reduced to $9.1 billion plus interest and penalties.

In a United Kingdom case, RCS Contractors Ltd v. Conway, the parties to an otherwise valid oral contract for construction services disagreed as to whether they had entered a single oral contract for work at three sites, or three separate contracts, one for each work site. Without a written agreement, the court had to examine other evidence to attempt to discern the intent of the parties, ultimately concluding that the parties were operating under a single contract.

== See also ==
- Parol evidence rule
- Statute of frauds
- Arthur Corbin
