= Petroleum Royalties (Relief) Act 1983 =

Act of the Parliament of the United Kingdom

Petroleum Royalties (Relief) Act 1983 (Note: Section 2(1).)
- Act of Parliament
- Parliament of the United Kingdom
- Long title: An Act to confer on holders of petroleum production licences an exemption from royalties (including royalties in kind) in respect of petroleum from certain new fields off the coast of Great Britain
- Citation: 1983 chapter 59
- Introduced by: 4 July 1983 The Secretary of State for Energy, Mr. Peter Walker (Second reading) (Commons)
- Territorial extent: England and Wales; Scotland; (Note: Section 2(3).)

Dates
- Royal assent: 21 December 1983
- Commencement: 21 February 1984 (Note: Section 223).)

Other legislation
- Amends: Petroleum (Production) Regulations 1982; Oil and Gas (Enterprise) Act 1982
- Amended by: Petroleum Royalties (Relief) and Continental Shelf Act 1989; Petroleum Act 1998
- Relates to: Petroleum (Production) Act 1934; Oil and Gas (Enterprise) Act 1982; Petroleum (Production) Regulations 1982; Finance Act 1983

Status: Amended

Text of statute as originally enacted

Revised text of statute as amended

Text of the Petroleum Royalties (Relief) Act 1983 as in force today (including any amendments) within the United Kingdom, from legislation.gov.uk.

The Petroleum Royalties (Relief) Act 1983 (c. 59) is an act of the Parliament of the United Kingdom which exempted certain petroleum licence holders of new offshore oil and gas fields from the payment of petroleum royalties or the delivery of petroleum.

== Background ==
In the Budget statement in 1983 the Chancellor of the Exchequer announced changes to the taxation in the oil industry. He noted that Government had a responsibility to compare the likely returns from future development both to the Government and to the industry, and had to ensure that the country obtained the appropriate benefit.

The demarcation line between the direct benefit to the nation and the benefit to the oil and gas industry work was such that, after the Budget measures and taxation proposals and the measures in this Act the nation would obtain the majority of the benefit. Petroleum revenue tax was 75 per cent, and corporation tax was 52 per cent. The measures in this Act meant that benefit from other discoveries and developments will benefit the nation as a whole. As a result of the application of royalties for future developments outside the southern basin of the North Sea, the marginal tax rate for a field paying petroleum revenue tax will be reduced from 89.5 to 88 per cent.

Oil production increased and the Government's revenue from North Sea taxation in 1984/5 was £12 billion or 8 per cent of total tax revenue.

In response to the oil price fall in 1986 the Government reduced taxation further by enacting the Advance Petroleum Revenue Tax Act 1986.

== Provisions ==
The act received royal assent on 21 December 1983. Its long title is ‘An Act to confer on holders of petroleum production licences an exemption from royalties (including royalties in kind) in respect of petroleum from certain new fields off the coast of Great Britain.’

The acts comprises two sections:

- Section 1. Royalty exemption for petroleum from certain new offshore fields.
- Section 2. Short title, commencement and extent.

== Subsequent developments ==
Section 1 of the act was extended by Petroleum Royalties (Relief) and Continental Shelf Act 1989.

Section 1 of the act was amended by Petroleum Act 1998.

== See also ==
- Oil and gas industry in the United Kingdom
- North Sea Oil
- Petroleum Act
