= Statute of frauds =

Type of statute specifying that certain contracts must be in writing

A statute of frauds is a form of statute requiring that certain kinds of contracts be memorialized in writing, signed by the party against whom they are to be enforced, with sufficient content to evidence the contract. (Note: The list of contracts that fall under a traditional statute of frauds can be remembered by using the mnemonic "MY LEGS": Marriage, contracts for more than one Year, Land, Executor (or Estate), Goods ($500.00 or more), Surety.)

== Terminology ==
The term statute of frauds comes from the Statute of Frauds, an act of the Parliament of England (29 Chas. 2 c. 3) passed in 1677 (authored by Lord Nottingham assisted by Sir Matthew Hale, Sir Francis North and Sir Leoline Jenkins and passed by the Cavalier Parliament), the long title of which is: An Act for Prevention of Frauds and Perjuries.

Many common law jurisdictions have made similar statutory provisions, while a number of civil law jurisdictions have equivalent legislation incorporated into their civil codes. The original English statute itself may still be in effect in a number of Canadian provinces, depending on the constitutional or reception statute of English law, and any subsequent legislative developments.

== Application ==
The statute of frauds typically requires a signed writing in the following circumstances:

- Contracts in consideration of marriage. This provision covers prenuptial agreements.
- Contracts that cannot be performed within one year. However, contracts of indefinite duration do not fall under the statute of frauds regardless of how long the performance actually takes.
- Contracts for the transfer of an interest in land. This applies not only to a contract to sell land but also to any other contract in which land or an interest in it is disposed, such as the grant of a mortgage or an easement.
- Contracts by the executor of a will to pay a debt of the estate with his own money.
- Contracts in which one party becomes a surety (acts as guarantor) for another party's debt or other obligation.
- Contracts for the sale of goods totaling $500.00 or more.

In an action for specific performance of a contract to convey land, the agreement must be in writing to satisfy the statute of frauds. The statute is satisfied if the contract to convey is evidenced by a writing or writings containing the essential terms of a purchase and sale agreement and signed by the party against whom the contract is to be enforced. If there is no written agreement, a court of equity can specifically enforce an oral agreement to convey only if the part performance doctrine is satisfied. In most jurisdictions, part performance is proven when the purchaser pays the purchase price, has possession of the land and makes improvements on the land, all with the permission of the seller. No jurisdiction is satisfied by payment of the purchase price alone.

Under common law, the statute of frauds also applies to contract modifications. For example, in an oral agreement for the lease of a car for nine months, immediately after taking possession, the lessor then decides that he really likes the car and makes an oral offer to the lessee to extend the term of the lease by an additional six months. Although neither agreement alone comes under the statute of frauds, the oral extension modifies the original contract to make it a fifteen-month lease (nine months plus the additional six), thereby bringing it under the statute as the contract now exceeds twelve months in duration. In theory, the same principle works in reverse as well, such that an agreement to reduce a lease from fifteen months to nine months would not require a writing. However, many jurisdictions have enacted statutes that require a writing for such situations.

=== Raising the defense ===
A defendant in a contract case who wants to use the statute of frauds as a defense must raise it as an affirmative defense in a timely manner. The burden of proving that a written contract exists comes into play only when a statute of frauds defense is raised by the defendant.

=== Exceptions ===
An agreement may be enforced even if it does not comply with the statute of frauds in the following situations:

- A statute of frauds defense may also be affected by a showing of part performance by proving the existence of one of two different conditions. If the parties have taken action in reliance on the agreement, as in the case Riley v. Capital Airlines, Inc., the court held that part performance does not take an executory portion of a contract out of the statute of frauds. Each performance constitutes a contract that falls outside the Statute of Frauds and was enforceable to the extent it is executed. However, the unexecuted portion of the contract falls within the Statute of Frauds and is unenforceable. As a result, only the executed portion of the contract can be recovered, and the doctrine of part performance does not remove the contract from the statute. On the other hand, the court, in Schwedes v. Romain, held that partial performance and grounds for estoppel can make the contract effective.
- Promissory estoppel can be applied in many but not all jurisdictions when the charging party detrimentally relies on the otherwise unenforceable contract. In England and Wales, the circumstances where promissory estoppel may be used to overcome the statute are limited, and some jurisdictions deny this possibility altogether.
- The "main purpose rule" as it relates to guarantee or suretyship type contracts: where the promisor's promise to answer for the debt of another is made mainly for the promisor's own economic advantage, then it is a primary promise, and enforceable even without a writing.
- Easements by implication: easements, which are agreements that permit the use of real estate by someone who has no property interest in the land, may be created by operation of law rather than by written instrument. This may happen where, for example, a piece of land is partitioned between owners and pre-existing utilities routes or access paths that would otherwise be trespassory over one of the plots is reasonably necessary for enjoyment of the other plot. In such case, the pre-existing use must be apparent and continuous at the time of the partition for an easement to be created by implication. The implied easement constitutes an interest in land that does not require a writing to be enforceable.

== By jurisdiction ==
=== Canada ===
The Statute of Frauds recites that it was enacted for the ". . . prevention of many fraudulent practices which are commonly endeavored to be upheld by perjury . . .". The mischief arising from claimants asserting oral agreements was to be avoided by requiring that certain contracts be evidenced by "some memorandum or note thereof . . . in writing and signed by the party to be charged therewith . . .". Contracts respecting land "created by livery and seisen only or by parole" would not be enforced absent such a writing.

It quickly became apparent to the common law judges that the Statute might itself become an instrument of fraud (or at least injustice) if it was strictly enforced with respect to contracts that were wholly or partly performed.

The courts developed the concept of "part performance" as an exception. If a contract concerning land was partly performed, that could displace the need for a note or memorandum in writing signed by the party to be charged.

It was one thing to create an exception that displaced the need for a memorandum in writing, but something else to completely nullify the Statute's operation. The thrust of the Statute was that contracts concerning land could not be proved by parol evidence alone. Thus, part performance might be an exception, but it could not, in effect, mean that the underlying contract could be proven by parol evidence. In developing the "part performance" exception, a balancing of the competing considerations was required. An important factor in the case law became that the part performance must be "unequivocally" related to the alleged contract.

=== Ireland ===
The Statute of Frauds, sub-titled "An Act for Prevention of Frauds and Perjuries", was passed in 1695 in Ireland. The statute took effect "from and after the feast day of the nativity of St. John Baptist [24 June], which shall be in the year of our Lord one thousand six hundred ninety-six", and is one of the few pre-Independence laws that survived the Statute Law Revision (Pre-1922) Act 2005 and the Statute Law Revision Act 2007. It remains largely in force today.

Some effects of the law have been softened by equity, for example the requirement that all contracts for sale of land be evidenced in writing can be circumvented by reliance on the doctrine of part performance.

=== United Kingdom ===
==== England and Wales ====
Mercantile Law Amendment Act 1856 (Note: Section 26.)
- Act of Parliament
- Parliament of the United Kingdom
- Long title: An Act to amend the Laws of England and Ireland affecting Trade and Commerce.
- Citation: 19 & 20 Vict. c. 97
- Territorial extent: England and Wales; Ireland; (Note: Section 27.)

Dates
- Royal assent: 29 July 1856
- Commencement: 29 July 1856 (Note: The Acts of Parliament (Commencement) Act 1793.)
Other legislation
Amended by	Bills of Exchange Act 1882; Partnership Act 1890; Sale of Goods Act 1893; Statute Law Revision Act 1894; Limitation Act 1939

Status: Amended

Text of statute as originally enacted

Revised text of statute as amended

Text of the Mercantile Law Amendment Act 1856 as in force today (including any amendments) within the United Kingdom, from legislation.gov.uk.

The Statute of Frauds, dating from 1677, (Note: This short title was given by the Short Titles Act 1896. It is written here as printed in "The Public General Acts, 1896", HMSO, 1896.) was largely repealed in England and Wales by the Law Reform (Enforcement of Contracts) Act 1954 (2 & 3 Eliz. 2. c. 34). The only provision of it extant is part of Section 4 which means that contracts of guarantee (surety for another's debt) are unenforceable unless evidenced in writing. This requirement is clarified by section 3 of the Mercantile Law Amendment Act 1856 (19 & 20 Vict. c. 97), dated 29 July 1856, which provides that the consideration for the guarantee need not appear in writing or require any necessary inference from a written document.

Section 6 of the Statute of Frauds Amendment Act 1828 (Note: This short title was given by the Short Titles Act 1896) (9 Geo. 4. c .14) (commonly known as Lord Tenterden's Act) was enacted to prevent Section 4 being circumvented by bringing an action against a verbal guarantor for the tort of deceit (the tort in Freeman v. Palsey). A common summary of the law is "a verbal guarantee (for a debt) isn't worth the paper it is written on".

Provisions in section 4 as to formalities for contracts for the sale of land were repealed by Schedule 7 to the Law of Property Act 1925 (15 & 16 Geo. 5. c. 20), however the requirement that contracts for the sale of land be evidenced in writing was maintained by section 40 of that Act, subsequently replaced by section 2 of the Law of Property (Miscellaneous Provisions) Act 1989 (c. 34).

==== Scotland ====
Section 6 of the Mercantile Law Amendment Act Scotland 1856 was derived from those parts of section 4 of the Statute of Frauds (1677) which relate to contracts of guarantee and from section 6 of the Statute of Frauds Amendment Act 1828.

It was repealed on 1 August 1995 by the Requirements of Writing (Scotland) Act 1995, sections 14(2) and Schedule 5 (with ss. 9(3)(5)(7), 13, 14(3)).

=== United States ===
In the United States, for contracts for the sale of goods that fall under the Uniform Commercial Code, additional exceptions may apply:

- Admission of the existence of a contract by the defendant under oath. However, the contract would only exist for the quantity of goods that were admitted. For instance, if the contract was for 100 televisions but the seller admitted in court that it was for 70 televisions, then the contract would exist only for 70 televisions and not the original 100.
- Merchant confirmation rule. If one merchant sends a writing sufficient to satisfy the statute of frauds to another merchant and the receiving merchant has reason to know of the contents of the sent confirmation and does not object to the confirmation within 10 days, the confirmation is good to satisfy the statute as to both parties, even if the confirmation was not signed by the party to be charged.
- The goods were specially manufactured for the buyer and the seller either 1) began manufacturing them, or 2) entered into a third party contract for their manufacture, and the manufacturer cannot without undue burden sell the goods to another person in the seller's ordinary course of business: for example, T-shirts with a Little League baseball team logo or wall-to-wall carpeting for an odd-sized room.

==== State laws ====
Every state has a statute that requires certain types of contracts to be in writing and signed by the party to be charged. The most common requirements are for contracts that involve the sale or transfer of land, and contracts that cannot be completed within one year. When the statute of frauds applies, a typical statute requires that the writing commemorating the agreement identify the contracting parties, recite the subject matter of the contract so that it is reasonably identifiable, and include the important terms and conditions of agreement.

The statute of frauds in various states comes in three types:

1. Those that follow the English statute and provide that "no action shall be brought" on the contract or the contract "shall not be enforced", e.g. the Arizona statute in Title 44.
2. Those that declare contracts "void".
3. Those that make the contract "voidable" at the affected party's election. (Note: e.g. Tex. Gov't Code Sec. 82.065 (a)(b) (contingent fee contract for legal services. http://www.statutes.legis.state.tx.us/Docs/GV/htm/GV.82.htm#82.065)

===== Colorado =====
Colorado has a number of different statutes of frauds applicable to different areas of law.

===== Texas =====
In addition to the statute of frauds as conventionally defined, (Note: The Statute of Frauds generally renders a contract that falls within its purview unenforceable unless an exception applies. TEX. BUS. & COM. CODE § 26.01(a).) the State of Texas has two rules that govern the litigation process, each of which also has the character of a statute of frauds. One is a rule of general applicability and requires agreements between counsel (or a party, if self-represented) to be in writing to be enforceable. Tex. R. Civ. P. 11. (Note: Texas Rule of Civil Procedure 11 provides as follows: Unless otherwise provided in these rules, no agreement between attorneys or parties touching any suit pending will be enforced unless it be in writing, signed and filed with the papers as part of the record, or unless it be made in open court and entered of record. http://www.txcourts.gov/media/1435952/trcp-all-updated-with-amendments-effective-january-1-2018.pdf)

Agreements under Texas Rule of Civil Procedure 11 are called "Rule 11 Agreements" and may either concern settlement or any procedural aspect, such as an agreement regarding scheduling, continuances of trial settings, or discovery matters. The rule has existed since 1840 and has contained the filing requirement since 1877. The number designation can cause confusion to non-Texas attorneys because the federal rule 11 is the sanctions rule, whose state-court counterpart has the number designation 13 under the Texas Rules of Civil Procedure (TRCP).

The other rule that is in the nature of a statute of frauds governs fee agreements with clients when the attorney is to be compensated based on the outcome of the case. The Texas Government Code requires that "[a] contingent fee contract for legal services must be in writing and signed by the attorney and client." TEX. GOV'T CODE ANN. § 82.065(a).

The classic example is a contingent fee contract in a personal injury case that provides for the claimant's lawyer to receive a certain percentage of the settlement amount (or of the amount awarded by judgment) net of litigation costs, with the percentages typically staggered and increasing based on whether a settlement was obtained before lawsuit is filed, after a lawsuit was filed but before trial, or whether a judgment favorable to the client was obtained through trial. The other scenario is a contingency fee contract based on cost savings achieved (for a client who is a defendant sued for a money judgment) or based on other specified litigation objectives. In those cases, the client will not recover any money from his opponent in the lawsuit, and will have to pay his attorney from his or her own funds in accordance with the terms of the agreement, once the matter is concluded favorably. When the client does not pay, some attorneys then sue the client on the contingency fee contract, or in quantum meruit in the alternative. See, e.g., Shamoun & Norman, LLP v. Hill, 483 S.W.3d 767 (Tex. App.-Dallas 2016), reversed on other grounds by Hill v. Shamoun & Norman, LLP, No. 16-0107 (Tex. April 13, 2018). The attorney-vs-client fee-dispute issue generally does not arise in personal injury cases because the settlement funds from the settling party or judgment-debtor are disbursed through the attorney of the party entitled to them, net of costs and the contingency fee component.

==== Uniform Commercial Code ====
In addition to general statutes of frauds, under Article 2 of the Uniform Commercial Code (UCC), every state except Louisiana has adopted an additional statute of frauds that relates to the sale of goods. Pursuant to the UCC, contracts for the sale of goods where the price equals $500 or more fall under the statute of frauds, with the exceptions for professional merchants performing their normal business transactions, and for any custom-made items designed for one specific buyer.

The application of the statute of frauds to dealings between merchants has been modified by provisions of the UCC. There is a "catch-all" provision in the UCC for personal property not covered by any other specific law, stating that a contract for the sale of such property where the purchase price exceeds $500 is not enforceable unless memorialized by a signed writing. The most recent UCC revision increases the triggering point for the UCC Statute of Frauds to $5,000, but states have been slow to amend their versions of the statute to increase the trigger point.

For purposes of the UCC, a defendant who admits the existence of the contract in his pleadings, under oath in a deposition or affidavit, or at trial, may not use the statute of frauds as a defense. However, a statute of frauds defense may still be available under a state's general statute.

With respect to securities transactions, the Uniform Commercial Code has abrogated the statute of frauds. The drafters of the most recent revision commented that "with the increasing use of electronic means of communication, the statute of frauds is unsuited to the realities of the securities business."

== See also ==
- Oral contract
- Parol evidence rule
- Quia Emptores
