= Sale of Goods Act 1893 =

Act of the Parliament of the United Kingdom

Sale of Goods Act 1893 (Note: Section 64)
- Act of Parliament
- Parliament of the United Kingdom
- Long title: An Act for codifying the Law relating to the Sale of Goods.
- Citation: 56 & 57 Vict. c. 71
- Territorial extent: United Kingdom

Dates
- Royal assent: 20 February 1894
- Commencement: 1 January 1894 (Note: Section 63.)
- Repealed: 1 January 1982
Other legislation
Amends	See § Repealed enactments
Repeals/revokes	See § Repealed enactments
Amended by	Misrepresentation Act 1967; Criminal Law Act 1967; Theft Act 1968; Supply of Goods (Implied Terms) Act 1973; Consumer Credit Act 1974
Repealed by	Sale of Goods Act 1979; Senior Courts Act 1981

Status: Repealed

Text of statute as originally enacted

Revised text of statute as amended

The Sale of Goods Act 1893 (56 & 57 Vict. c. 71) was an act of the Parliament of the United Kingdom to regulate contracts in which goods are sold and bought and to define the rights and duties of the parties (where not expressly defined in the agreement), while specifically preserving the relevance of ordinary contractual principles.

The act codified the common law on sale of goods, including the market overt rule.

The act was repealed in the United Kingdom in 1980 and 1982 but remains in force in Ireland, having been carried over into Irish law following independence.

== Background ==
The act was drafted by Sir Mackenzie Chalmers, who later drafted the Marine Insurance Act 1906. As noted by Lord Denning MR in The Mihalis Angelos [1971] 1 QB 164 he adopted a division between conditions and warranties in terms of contracts, propounded by Sir Frederick Pollock in his book Formation of Contracts. This was followed by Fletcher Moulton LJ in a celebrated dissent in Wallis, Son & Wells v Pratt & Haynes [1910] 2 KB 1003, 1012 and adopted by the House of Lords in [1911] AC 394.

The act is considered to be classic example of a codifying statute; that is, it draws on established judge-made common law principles and converts them into a more accessible statutory form. The act's successor in the United Kingdom, the Sale of Goods Act 1979, shares the same structure, phraseology and numbering as the 1893 act.

== Provisions ==
=== Repealed enactments ===
Section 60 of the act repealed 5 enactments, listed in the schedule to the act. The repeal did not affect anything done or suffered, or any right, title or interest acquired or accrued before the commencement of the act, or any legal proceeding or remedy in respect of any such thing, right, title or interest.

Citation	Short title	Description	Extent of repeal
1 Jas. 1. c. 21 (Note: This is the citation in The Statutes of the Realm.)	Act Against Brokers 1603	An Act against brokers.	The whole act.
29 Cha. 2. c. 3	Statute of Frauds	An Act for the prevention of frauds and perjuries.	Sections fifteen and sixteen. (Note: Commonly cited as sections sixteen and seventeen.)
9 Geo. 4. c. 14	Statute of Frauds Amendment Act 1828	An Act for rendering a written memorandum necessary to the validity of certain promises and engagements.	Section seven.
19 & 20 Vict. c. 60	Mercantile Law Amendment Act (Scotland) 1856	The Mercantile Law Amendment (Scotland) Act, 1856.	Sections one, two, three, four, and five.
19 & 20 Vict. c. 97	Mercantile Law Amendment Act 1856	The Mercantile Law Amendment Act, 1856.	Sections one and two.

== Subsequent developments ==
The whole act, except for section 26 (effect of writs of execution), was repealed for the United Kingdom, subject to a number of savings, by section 63(2) of, and schedule 3 to, the Sale of Goods Act 1979, which came into force on 1 January 1980.

Section 26 of the act was repealed for the United Kingdom by section 152(4) of, and schedule 7 to, the Senior Courts Act 1981, which came into force on 1 January 1982.

The act remains in operation in Ireland, although it has been amended on a number of occasions.

== See also ==
- Sale of Goods Act
- Sale of Goods and Supply of Services Act 1980
- Bentsen v Taylor, Sons & Co [1893] 2 QB 274, 280, per Bowen LJ adopting the SGA 1893 scheme of conditions and warranties.
