= Wesleyan Assurance Society =

Financial Services Mutual

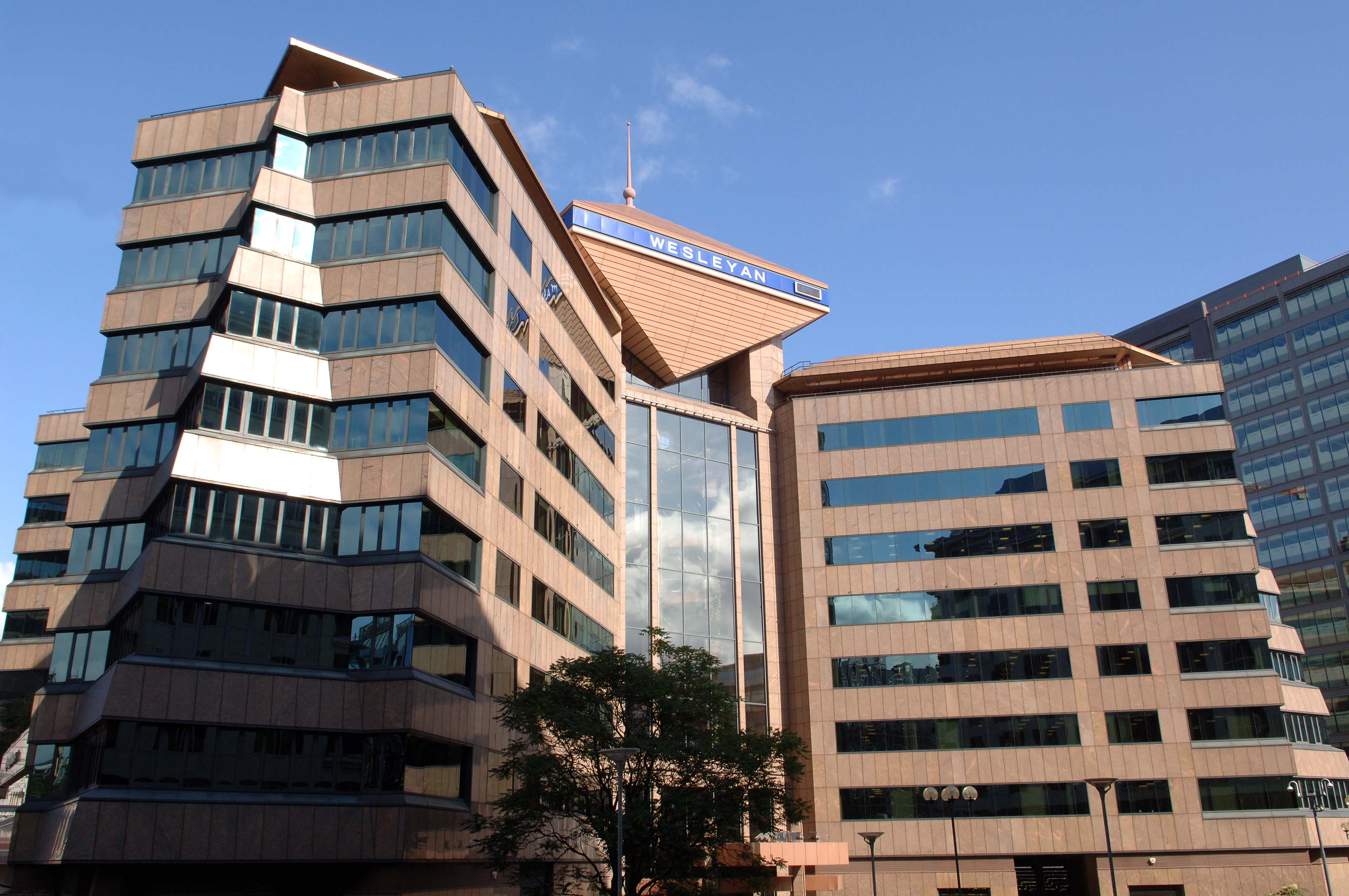
- Headquarters in Birmingham, UK
- Type: Mutual
- Industry: Banking; Financial services
- Founded: 1841
- Headquarters: Birmingham, England, UK
- Key people: Chief Executive Officer: Mario Mazzocchi
- Products: Savings, mortgages, investments, pensions, insurance
- Total assets: £8 billion (2019)
- Number of employees: >1,200+
- Website: www.wesleyan.co.uk

Wesleyan Assurance Society is a financial services mutual that provides advice and products to select professional groups, notably GPs, hospital doctors, dentists and teachers.

The society was founded in Birmingham, England, in 1841 and its head office remains in the city centre – based at Colmore Circus.

The mutual reported £7.2 billion of assets under management for the financial year ending 31 December 2022.

== History ==
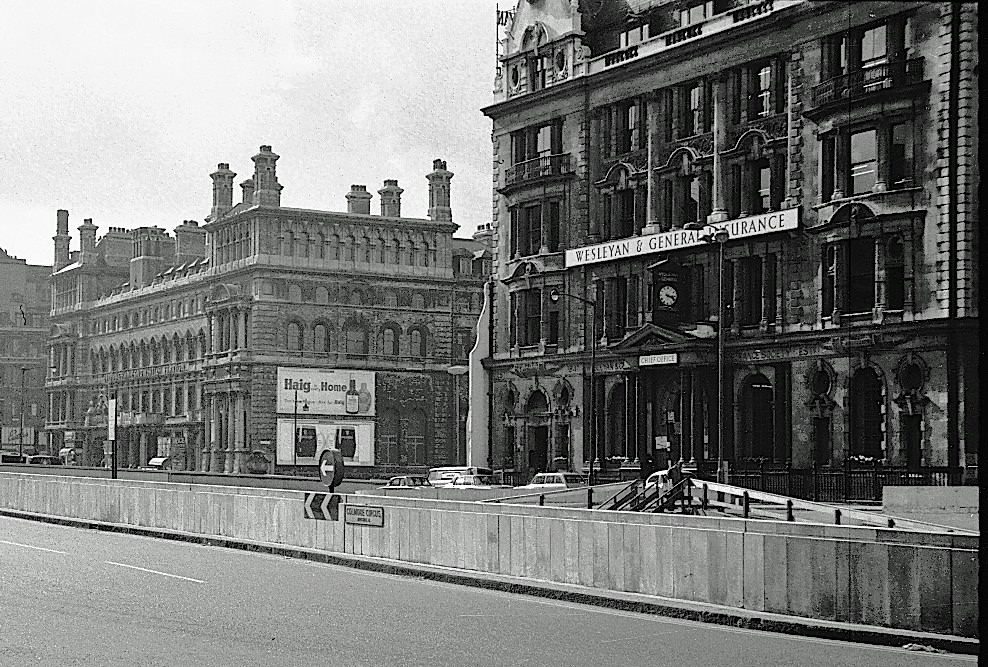
Office on Colmore Circus, Birmingham in 1968

Wesleyan was established in Birmingham during the early years of Queen Victoria's reign. It was founded in 1841 by members of the Wesleyan Methodist Church to help people overcome financial problems brought on by the first Industrial Revolution. The society began offering life assurance on a nationwide scale in 1855 and continued to grow in the late 1800s.

Wesleyan and General Assurance Society Act 1914
- Act of Parliament
- Parliament of the United Kingdom
- Long title: An Act to incorporate the Wesleyan and General Assurance Society and to provide for the management of its affairs and to confer further powers upon the Society and for other purposes.
- Citation: 4 & 5 Geo. 5. c. clxvii

Dates
- Royal assent: 7 August 1914
Other legislation
Amended by	Wesleyan and General Assurance Society Act 1954
Repealed by	Wesleyan Assurance Society Act 1989

Status: Repealed

Text of statute as originally enacted

The Wesleyan and General Assurance Society Act 1914 (4 & 5 Geo. 5. c. clxvii) gave the society a corporate identity of its own and allowed it more investment freedom. The society was also a subscriber to the government and allies' War Loan funds during the Great War, and in February a single cheque for £250,000 was drawn for this purpose. To celebrate the end of the war, the government issued Victory Bond policies and the Wesleyan & General bought bonds amounting to £3/4 million

Following the outbreak of World War II, the Chief Office basement and other buildings owned by the society were converted into air raid shelters, with a local first aid HQ established in the basement toilets. According to the Glasgow Herald, the society also applied for £50,000 of National War Bonds in June 1940.

Wesleyan and General Assurance Society Act 1954
- Act of Parliament
- Parliament of the United Kingdom
- Long title: An Act to amend the Wesleyan and General Assurance Society Act 1914 and the Rules of the Society; and for other purposes.
- Citation: 2 & 3 Eliz. 2. c. xlii

Dates
- Royal assent: 30 July 1954
Other legislation
Amends	Wesleyan and General Assurance Society Act 1914
Repealed by	Wesleyan Assurance Society Act 1989

Status: Repealed

Wesleyan Assurance Society Act 1989
- Act of Parliament
- Parliament of the United Kingdom
- Long title: An Act to repeal the Wesleyan and General Assurance Society Acts 1914 and 1954; to make new provision for the regulation and management of the Wesleyan Assurance Society; and for other purposes.
- Citation: 1989 c. viii

Dates
- Royal assent: 6 July 1989
Other legislation
Repeals/revokes	Wesleyan and General Assurance Society Act 1914; Wesleyan and General Assurance Society Act 1954

Text of statute as originally enacted

In 1989 the formal name of the organisation was shorted from Wesleyan and General Assurance Society to Wesleyan Assurance Society by the Wesleyan Assurance Society Act 1989 (c. viii).

In 1991 the society celebrated its 150th anniversary and moved into its current Head Office at Colmore Circus, Birmingham. A special limited edition Anniversary Bond was also launched offering customers a guaranteed return with no risks.

1993 saw the launch of Wesleyan Savings Bank. In July 1997 the Wesleyan acquired the Medical Sickness Society. The merger enabled the society to reach many more Doctors and Dentists, a position further strengthened with the acquisition of the Professional Affinity Group Services (PAGS) in 2002.

Wesleyan selected Birmingham Children's Hospital as its chosen charity in 2014 and raised £250,000 in twelve months, thus becoming their biggest corporate sponsor In 2015, they were the main sponsors of The Big Bandage for the third year running and agreed to extend their relationship with the hospital until the end of 2016. Wesleyan continued its corporate responsibility via the setting up of The Wesleyan Foundation in 2017. The foundation has since granted more than £2 million to charities and organisations across the UK.

Wesleyan Group continued to operate during the COVID-19 pandemic, shifting to remote work; Wesleyan Financial Services Consultants moved to a video format for its no-obligation financial review service. The Society has also launched a Wesleyan Wellbeing hub for its members, supporting key workers such as doctors, dentists and teachers with their health and wellbeing.

== Segmentation by profession ==
Each professional group is served by financial consultants who work only within their segment. Wesleyan is authorised and regulated by the Financial Conduct Authority and Prudential Regulation Authority.

Wesleyan provides financial products and services for medical and dental professionals, and represents 60% of UK doctors. The Society is also the approved financial advice partner for the Royal College of General Practitioners It also offers advice to teachers around the Teachers Pension Scheme as well as retirement planning, mortgages and investments. The society is also an approved partner of NASUWT.

== The Wesleyan Building ==
The Wesleyan Head Office building is one of the most well-known buildings in Birmingham thanks to its unusual cruciform shape and its large double pyramid shaped roof. The building was designed by Peter Hing & Jones and constructed between 1988 and 1991.

The building is clad in artificial pink granite which the Pevsner Guide for Birmingham says is, "angled between floors, like the legs of a huge insect." The name "Wesleyan" is displayed across the pyramid-shaped upper region.

According to an article in the Midlands Business News, "Intelligent lift technology has trebled the energy efficiency of Birmingham's iconic Wesleyan Assurance Society Building and reduced its annual carbon emissions".

The building houses more than 800 Wesleyan employees, and as of late 2018 also houses a number of Fintech investment management firms (in Partnership with the Investment Association) in a bespoke 5000sqft coworking space on its second floor. The building also houses a private GP surgery in partnership with London Doctors Clinic.
