= Sale of Goods and Supply of Services Act 1980 =

The Sale of Goods and Supply of Services Act, 1980 is an act of the Oireachtas, the Parliament of Ireland. It offers protection to the consumer when they purchases or hires new goods or services from a business for their own personal use. It states that goods must be of merchantable quality, they must fit their description and that services must be carried out with care. The principles are all goods must be: merchantable quality match sample fit for purpose as described
