= Slaughter of Animals (Scotland) Act 1980 =

Act of the Parliament of the United Kingdom

Slaughter of Animals (Scotland) Act 1980 (Note: Section 25(1).)
- Act of Parliament
- Parliament of the United Kingdom
- Long title: An Act to consolidate certain enactments relating to slaughterhouses, knackers' yards and the slaughter of animals in Scotland.
- Citation: 1980 c. 13
- Territorial extent: Scotland (Note: Section 25(2).)

Dates
- Royal assent: 20 March 1980
- Commencement: 20 March 1980 (Note: Section 4(b) of the Interpretation Act 1978.)
Other legislation
Amends	See § Repealed enactments
Repeals/revokes	See § Repealed enactments
Amended by	Food Safety Act 1990; Abolition of Feudal Tenure etc. (Scotland) Act 2000; Public Health etc. (Scotland) Act 2008; Police and Fire Reform (Scotland) Act 2012

Status: Partially repealed

Text of statute as originally enacted

Revised text of statute as amended

Text of the Slaughter of Animals (Scotland) Act 1980 as in force today (including any amendments) within the United Kingdom, from legislation.gov.uk.

The Slaughter of Animals (Scotland) Act 1980 (c. 13) is an act of the Parliament of the United Kingdom that consolidated enactments relating to slaughterhouses, knackers' yards and the slaughter of animals in Scotland.

== Provisions ==
=== Repealed enactments ===
Section 24(2) of the act repealed 6 enactments, listed in schedule 3 to the act.

Citation	Short title	Extent of repeal
60 & 61 Vict. c. 38	Public Health (Scotland) Act 1897	Section 33.
18 & 19 Geo. 5. c. 29	Slaughter of Animals (Scotland) Act 1928	The whole act.
1 & 2 Eliz. 2. c. 27	Slaughter of Animals (Pigs) Act 1953	The whole act.
2 & 3 Eliz. 2. c. 42	Slaughterhouses Act 1954	The whole act.
2 & 3 Eliz. 2. c. 59	Slaughter of Animals (Amendment) Act 1954	The whole act.
1972 c. 62	Agriculture (Miscellaneous Provisions) Act 1972	Sections 6 and 7.
1972 c. 62	Agriculture (Miscellaneous Provisions) Act 1972	Schedules 1 and 2.
