= Law Reform (Enforcement of Contracts) Act 1954 =

Act of the Parliament of the United Kingdom

Law Reform (Enforcement of Contracts) Act 1954 (Note: Section 3(1).)
- Act of Parliament
- Parliament of the United Kingdom
- Long title: An Act to amend section four of the Statute of Frauds, 1677; and to repeal section four of the Sale of Goods Act, 1893.
- Citation: 2 & 3 Eliz. 2. c. 34
- Territorial extent: England and Wales; Scotland; (Note: Section 3(2).)

Dates
- Royal assent: 4 June 1954
- Commencement: 4 June 1954 (Note: The Acts of Parliament (Commencement) Act 1793.)
- Repealed: 27 June 1974
Other legislation
Amends	Statute of Frauds; Sale of Goods Act 1893
Repealed by	Statute Law (Repeals) Act 1974

Status: Repealed

Text of statute as originally enacted

The Law Reform (Enforcement of Contracts) Act 1954 (2 & 3 Eliz. 2. c. 34) was an act of the Parliament of the United Kingdom that amended section 4 of the Statute of Frauds (29 Cha. 2. c. 3) and repealed section 4 of the Sale of Goods Act 1893 (56 & 57 Vict. c. 71).

== Background ==
The act gave effect to recommendations that had long been urged by law reformers to remove several of the formal requirements imposed by section 4 of the Statute of Frauds (29 Cha. 2. c. 3), under which certain classes of contract were unenforceable unless evidenced in writing and signed by the party to be charged. The Law Revision Committee, in its Sixth Interim Report (1937), had concluded that the writing requirement served no useful purpose for most of the contracts covered and operated as a technical trap enabling parties to escape obligations they had freely undertaken.

== Provisions ==
=== Amendment to the Statute of Frauds ===
Section 1 of the act amended section 4 of the Statute of Frauds (29 Cha. 2. c. 3) by removing the requirement for written evidence for three of the four types of contract then subject to that requirement: contracts in which an executor or administrator promised to answer damages out of their own estate; contracts made in consideration of marriage; and contracts not to be performed within one year of the making thereof. The requirement for contracts of suretyship—the guarantee of another person's debt or default—was retained.

=== Repeal of the writing requirement for sale of goods ===
Section 2 of the act repealed section 4 of the Sale of Goods Act 1893 (56 & 57 Vict. c. 71).

== Subsequent developments ==
The Sale of Goods Act 1893 (56 & 57 Vict. c. 71) was wholly repealed by the Sale of Goods Act 1979. The Statute of Frauds continues in force as amended by the act, retaining the requirement for written evidence for contracts of guarantee.

The whole act was repealed by section 1 of, and part XI of the schedule to, the Statute Law (Repeals) Act 1974, which came into force on 27 June 1974.
