= Statute of Frauds =

Act of the Parliament of England

Statute of Frauds (Note: The citation of this act by this short title was authorised by section 1 of, and schedule 1 to, the Short Titles Act 1896. Due to the repeal of those provisions, it is now authorised by section 19(2) of the Interpretation Act 1978.)
- Act of Parliament
- Parliament of England
- Long title: An Act for prevention of Frauds and Perjuryes. (Note: These words are printed against this act in the second column of Schedule 1 to the Short Titles Act 1896, which is headed "Title".)
- Citation: 29 Cha. 2. c. 3
- Territorial extent: England and Wales

Dates
- Royal assent: 16 April 1677
- Commencement: 24 June 1677 (OS) (Note: Section 1.)
Other legislation
Amended by	Administration of Intestates' Estate Act 1685; Wills Act 1837; Civil Procedure Acts Repeal Act 1879; Statute Law Revision and Civil Procedure Act 1881; Statute Law Revision Act 1888; Sale of Goods Act 1893; Short Titles Act 1896; Law of Property (Amendment) Act 1924; Law of Property Act 1925; Administration of Estates Act 1925; Statute Law Revision Act 1948; Law Reform (Enforcement of Contracts) Act 1954; Statute Law (Repeals) Act 1969
Relates to	Wills Act 1751

Status: Partially repealed

Text of statute as originally enacted

Revised text of statute as amended

Text of the Statute of Frauds (1677) as in force today (including any amendments) within the United Kingdom, from legislation.gov.uk.

The Statute of Frauds (29 Cha. 2. c. 3) (1677) is an act of the Parliament of England. In its original form it required that certain types of contracts, wills, and grants, and assignment or surrender of leases or interest in real property must be in writing and signed to avoid fraud on the court by perjury and the subornation of perjury. It also required that documents of the courts be signed and dated. Today it is mostly repealed; only section 4 remains, which is about guarantors.

== History ==
The attested date for the enactment of the Statute of Frauds is 16 April 1677 (New Style). The act is believed to have been primarily drafted by Lord Nottingham assisted by Sir Matthew Hale, Sir Francis North and Sir Leoline Jenkins.

When the Statute of Frauds was originally enacted, its sections and the clauses within section 4 were not numbered. Numbers where added when the act was republished in the Statutes at Large. The Statute at Large, Cambridge Edition published in 1770 divided the act into 25 sections. The section on the sale of goods was section 17. In The Statutes of the Realm published in 1818, the Statute of Frauds was divided into 24 sections. The section on the sale of goods became section 16. This article uses the same numbering system as the Statutes of the Realm.

Almost all of the statute has been repealed, leaving a line of introductory text and an amended section 4.

== Real property ==
Section 1 provides that all leases, estates, and interest in freehold or term of years created by livery and seisin or parole not in writing signed by the maker shall have the effect as an estate of lease at will.

Section 2 excepts from section 1 all leases not exceeding three years in term where rent equals two thirds of the value of the improved land.

Section 3 provides that all leases, estates, and interest in freehold or term of years assigned granted or surrendered must be by deed or note in writing signed by the grantor or his agent or by operation of law.

Section 7 provides that all conveyances in trusts of land must be in writing signed by the maker or by will.

Section 9 provides that all grants and assignments of trusts in land must be in writing signed by the grantor or by will.

Section 8 excepts from section 7 and 9 trusts that arise or result by implication of construction of law i.e. resulting trusts and constructive trusts.

Sections 1 to 3 and 7 to 9 and 24 were repealed by section 207 of, and Schedule 7 to, the Law of Property Act 1925 (15 & 16 Geo. 5. c. 20). However section 53(1)(a) required that interest in land be created or disposed by a signed writing, a will or operation of law. Section 53(1)(b) requires a declaration of trust in land must be by a signed writing or a will and section 53(1)(c) requires the same disposition of equitable interests and existing trusts. Section 52(2) state that section 53 does not affect the creation or operation of implied, resulting or constructive trusts. Section 54 provides interests in land created by parol and not put in writing and signed have the force and effect of interests at will only except that the lease for 3 years or less at the best rent may be made by parol.

== Section 4 ==
Section 4 of the Statute of Frauds originally provided that an action may not be brought on the following types of contracts unless there is a written note or memorandum signed by the party being charged or a person authorized by them:

1. Contracts by the executor of a will to pay a debt of the estate with his own money.
2. Contracts in which one party becomes a surety (acts as guarantor) for another party's debt or other obligation.
3. Contracts in consideration of marriage.
4. Contracts for the transfer of an interest in land.
5. Contracts that cannot be performed within one year.

This section now provides that contracts of guarantee (surety for another's debt) are unenforceable unless evidenced in writing. This requirement is subject to section 3 of the Mercantile Law Amendment Act 1856 (19 & 20 Vict. c.. 97) which provides that the consideration for the guarantee need not appear in writing or by necessary inference from a written document.

Section 6 of the Statute of Frauds Amendment Act 1828 (9 Geo. 4. c. 14) (commonly known as Lord Tenterden's Act) was enacted to prevent clause 2 section 4 being circumvented by bringing an action for the tort of deceit (the tort in Freeman v. Palsey).

In this section, the words "or upon any contract or sale of lands, tenements or hereditaments or any interest in or concerning them" were repealed by section 207 of, and Schedule 7 to, the Law of Property Act 1925 (15 & 16 Geo. 5. c. 20). However the requirement that contract for sale of land must be in writing was continued by section 40 of that act. Section 40 of the Law of Property Act 1925 was repealed by sections 2(8) and 4 of, and Schedule 2 to, the Law of Property (Miscellaneous Provisions) Act 1989; however, section 2 of that act requires that contracts for the sale of land be signed and in writing.

All the clauses except the one relating to surety contracts were repealed by section 1 of the Law Reform (Enforcement of Contracts) Act 1954 (2 & 3 Eliz. 2. c. 34).

This section does not apply (if it would otherwise do so) in relation to a financial collateral arrangement.

In 1937, the Law Revision Committee recommended that this section be repealed.

== Court procedure ==
Sections 10 and 11 of the act dealt with the execution of judgments upon equitable interests of cestui que trust in land and held free from the incumbrances of the persons seized in trust.

Sections 13 (Note: This section was divided into two sections in Statutes at Large: section 13 for the whereas clause and section 14 for the enactment clause.) and 14 of the act provide that the effective date for judgments against bona fide purchasers for value of land is the date they are docketed and requiring that judgments of the courts enter the date docketed when signing it without a fee.

Section 15 of the act provided that fieri facias or other writs of execution are effective against goods from the date given it is given to the sheriff and the sheriff shall write on the back of it the day, month and year he received it without a fee.

Section 17 of the act provided that recognisances shall bind bona fide purchasers for value of land from the time they are enrolled and requiring that the day month and year of the recognisance be entered on the roll without a fee.

Section 23 of the act preserved the jurisdiction of ecclesiastical courts to probate wills in personal property subject to the rules of this statute. Court of Probate Act 1857 (20 & 21 Vict. c. 77) transferred responsibility for the granting of probate from the ecclesiastical courts of England and Wales to a new civil Court of Probate in January 1858.

Section 24 of the act provided that the husband may be the administrator of the intestate estate of a married woman as before the Statute of Distribution (22 & 23 Cha. 2. c. 10).

Sections 13 and 14 of the act were repealed by section 2 of, and part I of the schedule to, the Civil Procedure Acts Repeal Act 1879 (42 & 43 Vict. c. 59), which came into force on 15 August 1879.

Sections 15 of the act was repealed by the schedule to the Sale of Goods Act 1893, but section 26 that act continued the requirement that fieri facias or other writs of execution are effective against goods from when they are given to the sheriff and the sheriff shall endorse the writ with the date and time he received it.

Section 17 of the act was repealed by section 1 of, and the schedule to, the Statute Law Revision and Civil Procedure Act 1881 (44 & 45 Vict. c. 59), which came into force on 27 August 1881.

Sections 10 and 11 and 23 and 24 of the act, so far as unrepealed, were repealed by section 56 of, and part I of schedule 2 to the Administration of Estates Act 1925 (15 & 16 Geo. 5. c. 23), which came into force on 1 January 1926.

Section 24 of the act was also repealed by section 207 of, and schedule 7 to, the Law of Property Act 1925 (15 & 16 Geo. 5. c. 20), which came into force on 1 January 1926.

== Section 16: Sales of goods ==
Section 16 provided that no contract for the sale of goods for the price of ten pounds sterling or more shall be good except if the buyer shall accept part of the goods and actually receive the same or give some thing in earnest to bind the bargain or in part of payment, or that some note or memorandum in writing of the said contract signed by the parties to be charged by such contract or their authorised agents. This section was amended by section 7 of the Statute of Frauds Amendment Act 1828 (9 Geo. 4. c. 14) to cover goods to be delivered in the future, not yet manufactured, or not yet fit for delivery.

Sections 15 and 16 was repealed by the schedule to the Sale of Goods Act 1893 (56 & 57 Vict. c. 71), although section 16 was substantially re-enacted as section 4 of the 1893 act.

Section 4 of the Sales of Goods Act 1893 was itself repealed by section 2 of the Law Reform (Enforcement of Contracts) Act 1954.

== Wills ==
Section 5 requires that wills devising land be in writing signed by the person devising the property or some other person at his direction, and shall be attested and subscribed in the presence of the said testator by three or four credible witnesses.

Section 6 provides that a gift of land in a will may only be revoked by another will or a codicil or other writing declaring the revocation executed in the same manner as a will is by section 5 or by testator or someone at his direction and in his presence burned, cancelled, torn or obliterated.

Section 1 of the Wills Act 1751 (25 Geo. 2. c. 6) provides that any gift in a will to person witnessing a will is void to the extent his testimony and he is a valid witness to the execution of the will under the Statute of Frauds. Section 2 provides if there gift is a charge on land to pay debts to the witness then the charge stands and the witness is admitted.

Section 12 provides that an estate pur autre vie may devised by will in writing signed by the testator or someone in his presence and at his express direction, attested and subscribed in the testators presence by three of more witnesses. It also provides for estate pur autre vie in cases where no devise is made.

Sections 18 through 20 provide rules for nuncupative (oral) wills for personal estates valued at over 30 pounds may be only made during the last illness of a testator. After six months have passed from the speaking of the will no testimony shall be received to prove a nuncupative will unless the testimony of the substance of it was committed to writing within six days of making the will. A nuncuparative will must be witnessed by three witnesses.

Section 16 of the Administration of Justice Act 1705 (4 & 5 Ann. c. 3) provided that any witness who could testify in court could witness a nuncuparative will.

Section 21 provides that a written will in personal property may not be repealed or altered orally except if it is put in writing during the life of the testator and read to him and allowed by him and proven by at least three witnesses.

Section 22 allows soldiers in actual military service and seamen at sea to dispose of their personal property as they might have done before the passage of this act.

So much of this act as related to devises or bequests of lands or tenements, or to the revocation or alteration of any devise in writing of any lands, tenements or hereditaments, or any clause thereof, or to the devise of any estate pur autre vie, or to any such estate being assets, or to nuncupative wills, or to the repeal, altering or changing of any will in writing concerning any goods or chattels or personal estate, or any clause, devise, or bequest therein was repealed by section 2 of the Wills Act 1837 (7 Will. 4 & 1 Vict. c. 26). The marginal note to that section said that the effect of this was to repeal sections 5 and 6 and 12 and 19 to 22. Legislation.gov.uk has this as sections 18 to 21 instead of 19 to 22.

Section 22 of the act was repealed by section 1 of, and part VII of the schedule to, the Statute Law (Repeals) Act 1969, which came into force on 1 January 1970. However section 11 of the Wills Act 1837 continues the right of Soldiers and Seamen to dispose of their personal estate as they had previously.

== See also ==
- Statute of frauds
- Statute of Uses
- Statute of Wills
