= Unsolicited advertisement =

Advertising against the wishes of recipients

Unsolicited advertisement comprise all of, but are not limited to:

- Traditional junk mail ("direct mailing", in industry terms)
- Spamming, in particular
  - Email spam,
- Telemarketing nuisance calls,
- Junk faxes,
- Unsolicited goods, etc.

for advertising and marketing purposes which are sent without request.

Unsolicited advertising usually violates informational self-determination, when the addresses to which advertising material is delivered have not been explicitly communicated to the sender by the addressee, i.e. no opt-in was done.

The FCC defines "unsolicited advertisement" as:

any material advertising the commercial availability or quality of any property, goods, or services which is transmitted to any person without that person’s prior express invitation or permission, in writing or otherwise.

— FCC

Whereas traditional postal advertisements produce huge amounts of waste paper and plastic waste, modern electronic forms consume bandwidth and data storage space. Various methods exist for prevention of and defense against unsolicited advertisements, including opt-out from email lists, entry in blocking lists, like Robinson lists or the National Do Not Call Registry, etc.. Legislation has produced countermeasures like the Telephone Consumer Protection Act.

== See also ==
- Targeted advertising
- Attention theft
