= List of statutory instruments of the United Kingdom, 2000 (1701–3500) =

This is an incomplete list of statutory instruments of the United Kingdom in 2000 (1701–3500).

== 1701–1800 ==
- The National Health Service (General Medical Services) Amendment (Wales) Regulations 2000 (S.I. 2000 No. 1707 (W. 114))
- Rheoliadau'r Gwasanaeth Iechyd Gwladol (Gwasanaethau Meddygol Cyffredinol) Diwygio (Cymru) 2000 (S.I. 2000 Rhif 1707 (Cy. 114))
- The National Health Service (Choice of Medical Practitioner) Amendment (Wales) Regulations 2000 (S.I. 2000 No. 1708 (W.115))
- Rheoliadau'r Gwasanaeth Iechyd Gwladol (Dewis Ymarferydd Meddygol) Diwygio (Cymru) 2000 (S.I. 2000 Rhif 1708 (Cy.115))
- The British Wool Marketing Scheme (Amendment) Order 2000 (S.I. 2000 No. 1709)
- The Relocation Grants (Forms of Application) (Amendment) (Wales) Regulations 2000 (S.I. 2000 No. 1710 (W.116))
- Rheoliadau Grantiau Adleoli (Ffurflenni Cais) (Diwygio) (Cymru) 2000 (S.I. 2000 Rhif 1710 (Cy.116))
- The Telecommunications (Licence Modification) (Satellite Operator Licences) Regulations 2000 (S.I. 2000 No. 1711)
- The Telecommunications (Licence Modification) (Regional Public Access Mobile Radio Operator Licences) Regulations 2000 (S.I. 2000 No. 1712)
- The Telecommunications (Licence Modifications) (Amendment) Regulations 2000 (S.I. 2000 No. 1713)
- The Telecommunications (Licence Modification) (Mobile Data Operator Licences) Regulations 2000 (S.I. 2000 No. 1714)
- The Telecommunications (Licence Modification) (Paging Operator Licences) Regulations 2000 (S.I. 2000 No. 1715)
- The Education (Outturn Statements) (Wales) Regulations 2000 (S.I. 2000 No. 1717 (W. 117))
- Rheoliadau Addysg (Datganiadau Alldro) (Cymru) 2000 (S.I. 2000 Rhif 1717 (Cy. 117))
- The West Norfolk Primary Care Trust (Establishment) Order 2000 (S.I. 2000 No. 1718)
- The Road Traffic (Permitted Parking Area and Special Parking Area) (Borough of Reading)Order 2000 (S.I. 2000 No. 1719)
- The Local Government Act 1999 (Commencement No. 3) (England) Order 2000 (S.I. 2000 No. 1724 (c. 45)])
- The Borough of Shrewsbury and Atcham (Electoral Changes) Order 2000 (S.I. 2000 No. 1725)
- The General Betting Duty (Amendment) Regulations 2000 (S.I. 2000 No. 1726)
- The Superannuation (Admission to Schedule 1 to the Superannuation Act 1972) (No. 2) Order 2000 (S.I. 2000 No. 1728)
- The Financial Services and Markets (Transitional Provisions) (Designated Date for Certain Self-Regulating Organisations) Order 2000 (S.I. 2000 No. 1734)
- The Housing Renewal Grants (Prescribed Form and Particulars and Welsh Form and Particulars) (Amendment) (Wales) Regulations 2000 (S.I. 2000 No. 1735 (W. 119 ))
- Rheoliadau Grantiau Adnewyddu Tai (Ffurflen a Manylion Rhagnodedig a Ffurflen a Manylion Cymraeg) (Diwygio) (Cymru) 2000 (S.I. 2000 Rhif 1735 (Cy. 119 ))
- The Time Off for Public Duties Order 2000 (S.I. 2000 No. 1737)
- The Dairy Products (Hygiene) (Charges) (Amendment) (Wales) Regulations 2000 (S.I. 2000 No. 1738 (W.121))
- Rheoliadau Cynhyrchion Llaeth (Hylendid) (Taliadau) (Diwygio) (Cymru) 2000 (S.I. 2000 Rhif 1738 (Cy.121))
- The Football Spectators (Seating) Order 2000 (S.I. 2000 No. 1739)
- The Herefordshire Primary Care Trust (Establishment) Order 2000 (S.I. 2000 No. 1748)
- The Herefordshire Community Health National Health Service Trust (Dissolution) Order 2000 (S.I. 2000 No. 1749)
- The Education (Funding for Teacher Training) Designation (No. 2) Order 2000 (S.I. 2000 No. 1750)
- The Hendon College (Dissolution) Order 2000 (S.I. 2000 No. 1751)
- The London Local Authorities (Charges for Stopping Up Orders) Regulations 2000 (S.I. 2000 No. 1752)
- The Health Service Medicines (Control of Prices of Specified Generic Medicines) Regulations 2000 (S.I. 2000 No. 1763)
- The London Borough of Bromley (Electoral Changes) Order 2000 (S.I. 2000 No. 1764)
- The London Borough of Camden (Electoral Changes) Order 2000 (S.I. 2000 No. 1765)
- The London Borough of Hillingdon (Electoral Changes) Order 2000 (S.I. 2000 No. 1766)
- The Royal Borough of Kingston upon Thames (Electoral Changes) Order 2000 (S.I. 2000 No. 1767)
- The London Borough of Newham (Electoral Changes) Order 2000 (S.I. 2000 No. 1768)
- The Rail Vehicle Accessibility (ScotRail Class 170/4 Vehicles) Exemption Order 2000 (S.I. 2000 No. 1769)
- The Rail Vehicle Accessibility (Anglia Railways Class 170/2 Vehicles) Exemption Order 2000 (S.I. 2000 No. 1770)
- The Royal Navy Terms of Service (Ratings) (Amendment) Regulations 2000 (S.I. 2000 No. 1771)
- The Royal Marines Terms of Service (Amendment) Regulations 2000 (S.I. 2000 No. 1772)
- The Local Authorities (Capital Finance) (Amendment) (England) Regulations 2000 (S.I. 2000 No. 1773)
- The Channel Tunnel (International Arrangements) (Amendment No. 2) Order 2000 (S.I. 2000 No. 1775)
- The Immigration (Control of Entry through Republic of Ireland) (Amendment) Order 2000 (S.I. 2000 No. 1776)
- The Education (Nutritional Standards for School Lunches) (England) Regulations 2000 (S.I. 2000 No. 1777)
- The Local Authorities' Traffic Orders (Exemptions for Disabled Persons) (Wales) Regulations 2000 (S.I. 2000 No. 1785 (W. 122 ))
- Rheoliadau Gorchmynion Traffig Awdurdodau Lleol (Esemptiadau ar gyfer Personau Anabl)(Cymru) 2000 (S.I. 2000 Rhif 1785 (Cy. 122 ))
- The Disabled Persons (Badges for Motor Vehicles) (Wales) Regulations 2000 (S.I. 2000 No. 1786 (W. 123))
- Rheoliadau Personau Anabl (Bathodynnau ar gyfer Cerbydau Modur)(Cymru) 2000 (S.I. 2000 Rhif 1786 (Cy. 123 ))
- The Northern Ireland Act 1998 (Designation of Public Authorities) Order 2000 (S.I. 2000 No. 1787)
- The Seed Potatoes (Amendment) (England) Regulations 2000 (S.I. 2000 No. 1788)
- The Oil and Fibre Plant Seeds (Amendment) (England) Regulations 2000 (S.I. 2000 No. 1789)
- The Vegetable Seeds (Amendment) (England) Regulations 2000 (S.I. 2000 No. 1790)
- The Beet Seeds (Amendment) (England) Regulations 2000 (S.I. 2000 No. 1791)
- The Fodder Plant Seeds (Amendment) (England) Regulations 2000 (S.I. 2000 No. 1792)
- The Cereal Seeds (Amendment) (England) Regulations 2000 (S.I. 2000 No. 1793)
- The Prison (Amendment) Rules 2000 (S.I. 2000 No. 1794)
- The Young Offender Institution (Amendment) (No. 2) Rules 2000 (S.I. 2000 No. 1795)
- The A406 Trunk Road (Hanger Lane and Woodville Gardens, Ealing) (Prohibition of Right Turn) Order 2000 (S.I. 2000 No. 1796)
- The Consumer Credit (Advertisements and Content of Quotations) (Amendment) Regulations 2000 (S.I. 2000 No. 1797)
- Electronic Communications Act 2000 (Commencement No. 1) Order 2000 (S.I. 2000 No. 1798 (C. 46)])
- The Colours in Food (Amendment) (Wales) Regulations 2000 (S.I. 2000 No. 1799 (W.124))
- Rheoliadau Lliwiau mewn Bwyd (Diwygio) (Cymru) 2000 (S.I. 2000 Rhif 1799 (Cy.124))
- The M1 Motorway (Junction 15) (Speed Limit) Regulations 2000 (S.I. 2000 No. 1800)

== 1801–1900 ==
- The Legal Aid (Notification of Very High Cost Cases) Regulations 2000 (S.I. 2000 No. 1801)
- The Legal Aid in Criminal and Care Proceedings (Costs) (Amendment) Regulations 2000 (S.I. 2000 No. 1802)
- The Medical Act 1983 (Amendment) Order 2000 (S.I. 2000 No. 1803)
- The Education (Student Loans) (Amendment) (England and Wales) Regulations 2000 (S.I. 2000 No. 1804)
- The Motor Cars (Driving Instruction) (Amendment) Regulations 2000 (S.I. 2000 No. 1805)
- The College of Care and Early Education (Dissolution) Order 2000 (S.I. 2000 No. 1806)
- The Tax Credits Schemes (Miscellaneous Amendments No. 3) Regulations 2000 (S.I. 2000 No. 1807)
- The Charities (Bristol, Clifton and West of England Zoological Society) Order 2000 (S.I. 2000 No. 1808)
- The Safety of Sports Grounds (Designation) Order 2000 (S.I. 2000 No. 1809)
- The Relevant Functions (Payments to Authorities) (Amendment) Order 2000 (S.I. 2000 No. 1810)
- The M621 Motorway (Speed Limit) Regulations 2000 (S.I. 2000 No. 1811)
- The Transfer of Functions (Agriculture and Fisheries) Order 2000 (S.I. 2000 No. 1812)
- The European Communities (Designation) (No. 2) Order 2000 (S.I. 2000 No. 1813)
- The Army, Air Force and Naval Discipline Acts (Continuation) Order 2000 (S.I. 2000 No. 1814)
- The International Seabed Authority (Immunities and Privileges) Order 2000 (S.I. 2000 No. 1815)
- The Pitcairn (Appeals to Privy Council) Order 2000 (S.I. 2000 No. 1816)
- The European Court of Human Rights (Immunities and Privileges) Order 2000 (S.I. 2000 No. 1817)
- The Angola (United Nations Sanctions) (Amendment) Order 2000 (S.I. 2000 No. 1818)
- The Angola (United Nations Sanctions) (Overseas Territories) (Amendment) Order 2000 (S.I. 2000 No. 1819)
- The Eritrea and Ethiopia (United Nations Sanctions) (Amendment) Order 2000 (S.I. 2000 No. 1820)
- The Eritrea and Ethiopia (United Nations Sanctions) (Overseas Territories) (Amendment) Order 2000 (S.I. 2000 No. 1821)
- The Sierra Leone (United Nations Sanctions) (Overseas Territories) Order 2000 (S.I. 2000 No. 1822)
- The Social Security (Contributions) (Republic of Korea) Order 2000 (S.I. 2000 No. 1823)
- The Civil Jurisdiction and Judgments Act 1982 (Amendment) Order 2000 (S.I. 2000 No. 1824)
- The Contracts (Applicable Law) Act 1990 (Amendment) Order 2000 (S.I. 2000 No. 1825)
- The Exempt Charities Order 2000 (S.I. 2000 No. 1826)
- The Attorney General's Salary Order 2000 (S.I. 2000 No. 1827)
- The Employment Relations (Offshore Employment) Order 2000 (S.I. 2000 No. 1828)
- The National Assembly for Wales (Transfer of Functions) (Variation) Order 2000 (S.I. 2000 No. 1829)
- The National Assembly for Wales (Transfer of Functions) (No. 2) Order 2000 (S.I. 2000 No. 1830)
- The Scotland Act 1998 (Modifications of Schedule 4) Order 2000 (S.I. 2000 No. 1831)
- The Angola (United Nations Sanctions) (Isle of Man) (Amendment) Order 2000 (S.I. 2000 No. 1836)
- The Angola (United Nations Sanctions) (Channel Islands) (Amendment) Order 2000 (S.I. 2000 No. 1837)
- The Eritrea and Ethiopia (United Nations Sanctions) (Isle of Man) (Amendment) Order 2000 (S.I. 2000 No. 1838)
- The Eritrea and Ethiopia (United Nations Sanctions) (Channel Islands) (Amendment) Order 2000 (S.I. 2000 No. 1839)
- The Sierra Leone (United Nations Sanctions) (Channel Islands) Order 2000 (S.I. 2000 No. 1840)
- The Medical Act 1983 (Medical Education) Order 2000 (S.I. 2000 No. 1841)
- The Water and Sewerage Undertakers (Inset Appointments) Regulations 2000 (S.I. 2000 No. 1842)
- The Sea Fishing (North-East Atlantic Control Measures) Order 2000 (S.I. 2000 No. 1843)
- The London Borough of Hammersmith and Fulham (Electoral Changes) Order 2000 (S.I. 2000 No. 1844)
- The London Borough of Enfield (Electoral Changes) Order 2000 (S.I. 2000 No. 1845)
- The London Borough of Brent (Electoral Changes) Order 2000 (S.I. 2000 No. 1846)
- The London Borough of Sutton (Electoral Changes) Order 2000 (S.I. 2000 No. 1847)
- The Education (School Government) (England) (Amendment) Regulations 2000 (S.I. 2000 No. 1848)
- The Special Immigration Appeals Commission (Procedure) (Amendment) Rules 2000 (S.I. 2000 No. 1849)
- The Merchant Shipping (EPIRB Registration) Regulations 2000 (S.I. 2000 No. 1850)
- The Human Rights Act 1998 (Commencement No. 2) Order 2000 (S.I. 2000 No. 1851 (C. 47)])
- The Data Protection (Designated Codes of Practice) (No. 2) Order 2000 (S.I. 2000 No. 1864)
- The Data Protection (Miscellaneous Subject Access Exemptions) (Amendment) Order 2000 (S.I. 2000 No. 1865)
- The Medical Food (Wales) Regulations 2000 (S.I. 2000 No. 1866 (W.125))
- Rheoliadau Bwyd Meddygol (Cymru) 2000 (S.I. 2000 Rhif 1866 (Cy.125))
- The Education (Transition to New Framework) (New Schools, Groups and Miscellaneous) Regulations 1999 (Amendment) (Wales) Regulations 2000 (S.I. 2000 No. 1867 (W.126))
- Rheoliadau (Diwygio) Rheoliadau Addysg (Trawsnewid i'r Fframwaith Newydd) (Ysgolion Newydd, Grwpiau ac Amrywiol) 1999 (Cymru) 2000 (S.I. 2000 Rhif 1867 (Cy.126))
- The Community Care (Direct Payments) Amendment (Wales) Regulations 2000 (S.I. 2000 No. 1868 (W.127))
- Rheoliadau Diwygio Gofal Cymunedol (Taliadau Uniongyrchol) (Cymru) 2000 (S.I. 2000 Rhif 1868 (Cy.127))
- The Welfare of Farmed Animals (England) Regulations 2000 (S.I. 2000 No. 1870)
- The Stamp Duty Reserve Tax (UK Depositary Interests in Foreign Securities) (Amendment) Regulations 2000 (S.I. 2000 No. 1871)
- The Magistrates' Courts (Extradition) (Amendment) Rules 2000 (S.I. 2000 No. 1872)
- The Youth Courts and Family Proceedings Courts (Constitution) (Amendment) Rules 2000 (S.I. 2000 No. 1873)
- The Inner London Youth Courts (Selection of Chairmen) (Amendment) Order 2000 (S.I. 2000 No. 1874)
- The Maintenance Orders (Facilities for Enforcement) (Amendment) Rules 2000 (S.I. 2000 No. 1875)
- The Legal Aid in Criminal and Care Proceedings (General) (Amendment) (No. 2) Regulations 2000 (S.I. 2000 No. 1876)
- The Legal Aid in Criminal and Care Proceedings (Costs) (Amendment) (No. 2) Regulations 2000 (S.I. 2000 No. 1877)
- The Criminal Justice Act 1993 (Extension of Group A Offences) Order 2000 (S.I. 2000 No. 1878)
- The Gaming Clubs (Hours and Charges) (Amendment) (No. 2) Regulations 2000 (S.I. 2000 No. 1879)
- The Income Tax (Sub-contractors in the Construction Industry) (Amendment No. 2) Regulations 2000 (S.I. 2000 No. 1880)
- The General Medical Council (Legal Assessors) (Amendment) Rules 2000 (S.I. 2000 No. 1881)
- The Foundation Subject (Amendment) (Wales) Order 2000 (S.I. 2000 No. 1882 (W.129))
- Gorchymyn Pwnc Sylfaen (Diwygio) (Cymru) 2000 (S.I. 2000 Rhif 1882 (Cy.129))
- The Watchet Harbour Revision Order 2000 (S.I. 2000 No. 1884)
- The Meat Products (Hygiene) (Amendment) (Wales) Regulations 2000 (S.I. 2000 No. 1885 (W. 131 ))
- Rheoliadau Cynhyrchion Cig (Hylendid) (Diwygio) (Cymru) 2000 (S.I. 2000 Rhif 1885 (Cy. 131 ))
- The National Health Service (General Medical Services) Amendment (No.3) (Wales) Regulations 2000 (S.I. 2000 No. 1887 (W. 133 ))
- Rheoliadau Diwygio (Rhif 3) y Gwasanaeth Iechyd Gwladol (Gwasanaethau Meddygol Cyffredinol) (Cymru) 2000 (S.I. 2000 Rhif 1887 (Cy. 133 ))
- Disability Rights Commission (Expenses) (Scotland) Regulations 2000 (S.I. 2000 No. 1888 (S. 6))

== 1901–2000 ==
- The Prescription Only Medicines (Human Use) Amendment Order 2000 (S.I. 2000 No. 1917)
- The Medicines (Sale or Supply) (Miscellaneous Provisions) Amendment (No. 2) Regulations 2000 (S.I. 2000 No. 1918)
- The Medicines (Pharmacy and General Sale—Exemption) Amendment Order 2000 (S.I. 2000 No. 1919)
- The Access to Justice Act 1999 (Commencement No. 4 and Transitional Provisions) Order 2000 (S.I. 2000 No. 1920 (C.48)])
- The Borough Council of Stockton-on-Tees (River Tees Bridge) Scheme 2000 Confirmation Instrument 2000, (S.I. 2000 No 1921)
- The Social Security Amendment (Students and Income-related Benefits) Regulations 2000 (S.I. 2000 No. 1922)
- The Insider Dealing (Securities and Regulated Markets) (Amendment) Order 2000 (S.I. 2000 No. 1923)
- The Criminal Justice Act 1988 (Reviews of Sentencing) Order 2000 (S.I. 2000 No. 1924)
- The Genetically Modified and Novel Foods (Labelling) (Wales) Regulations 2000 (S.I. 2000 No. 1925 (W. 134 ))
- Rheoliadau Bwydydd an Addaswyd yn Enetig a Bwydydd Newydd (Labelu) (Cymru) 2000 (S.I. 2000 Rhif 1925 (Cy. 134 ))
- The Social Security (Work-focused Interviews for Lone Parents) and Miscellaneous Amendments Regulations 2000 (S.I. 2000 No. 1926)
- The Electricity Works (Environmental Impact Assessment) (England and Wales) Regulations 2000 (S.I. 2000 No. 1927)
- The Pipe-line Works (Environmental Impact Assessment) Regulations 2000 (S.I. 2000 No. 1928)
- The Legal Aid (Functions) Order 2000 (S.I. 2000 No. 1929)
- The Legal Aid (Prescribed Panels) (Amendment) Regulations 2000 (S.I. 2000 No. 1930)
- The Gas (Third Party Access and Accounts) Regulations 2000 (S.I. 2000 No. 1937)
- The Education (Assisted Places) (Amendment) (Wales) Regulations 2000 (S.I. 2000 No. 1938 (W. 136 ))
- Rheoliadau Addysg (Lleoedd a Gynorthwyir) (Diwygio) (Cymru) 2000 (S.I. 2000 Rhif 1938 (Cy. 136 ))
- The Education (Assisted Places) (Incidental Expenses) (Amendment) (Wales) Regulations 2000 (S.I. 2000 No. 1939 (W.137))
- Rheoliadau Addysg (Lleoedd a Gynorthwyir) (Mân Dreuliau) (Diwygio) (Cymru) 2000 (S.I. 2000 Rhif 1939 (Cy.137))
- The Air Quality (Wales) Regulations 2000 (S.I. 2000 No. 1940 (W. 138 ))
- Rheoliadau Ansawdd Aer (Cymru) 2000 (S.I. 2000 Rhif 1940 (Cy. 138 ))
- The General Teaching Council for Wales (Additional Functions) Order 2000 (S.I. 2000 No. 1941 (W.139))
- Gorchymyn Cyngor Addysgu Cyffredinol Cymru (Swyddogaethau Ychwanegol) 2000 (S.I. 2000 Rhif 1941 (Cy.139))
- The Airedale Primary Care Trust (Establishment) Order 2000 (S.I. 2000 No. 1942)
- The Bradford South and West Primary Care Trust (Establishment) Order 2000 (S.I. 2000 No. 1943)
- The North Bradford Primary Care Trust (Establishment) Order 2000 (S.I. 2000 No. 1944)
- The Bradford City Primary Care Trust (Establishment) Order 2000 (S.I. 2000 No. 1945)
- The Television Licences (Disclosure of Information) Act 2000 (Prescription of Information) Order 2000 (S.I. 2000 No. 1955)
- The European Communities (Recognition of Professional Qualifications) (Amendment) Regulations 2000 (S.I. 2000 No. 1960)
- The Doncaster Central Primary Care Trust (Establishment) Order 2000 (S.I. 2000 No. 1961)
- The Bexley Primary Care Trust (Establishment) Order 2000 (S.I. 2000 No. 1962)
- The Housing (Service Charge Loans) (Amendment) (England) Regulations 2000 (S.I. 2000 No. 1963)
- The North Manchester Primary Care Trust (Establishment) Order 2000 (S.I. 2000 No. 1964)
- The Central Manchester Primary Care Trust (Establishment) Order 2000 (S.I. 2000 No. 1965)
- The Criminal Procedure and Investigations Act 1996 (Appointed Day No. 10) Order 2000 (S.I. 2000 No. 1968 (C. 49)])
- The Disability Discrimination Act 1995 (Commencement No. 7) Order 2000 (S.I. 2000 No. 1969 (C. 50)])
- The Public Service Vehicles Accessibility Regulations 2000 (S.I. 2000 No. 1970)
- The Road Vehicles (Construction and Use) (Amendment) (No. 2) Regulations 2000 (S.I. 2000 No. 1971)
- The Motor Vehicles (Approval) (Amendment) Regulations 2000 (S.I. 2000 No. 1972)
- The Pollution Prevention and Control (England and Wales) Regulations 2000 (S.I. 2000 No. 1973)
- The Education (Outturn Statements) (England) Regulations 2000 (S.I. 2000 No. 1974)
- The Horticultural Development Council (Amendment) Order 2000 (S.I. 2000 No. 1975)
- The London Borough of Greenwich (Electoral Changes) Order 2000 (S.I. 2000 No. 1977)
- The Jobseeker's Allowance (Joint Claims) Regulations 2000 (S.I. 2000 No. 1978)
- The General Teaching Council for Wales (Functions) Regulations 2000 (S.I. 2000 No. 1979 (W. 140 ))
- Rheoliadau Cyngor Addysgu Cyffredinol Cymru (Swyddogaethau) 2000 (S.I. 2000 Rhif 1979 (Cy. 140 ))
- The Education (National Curriculum) (Modern Foreign Languages) (Wales) Order 2000 (S.I. 2000 No. 1980 (W. 141 ))
- Gorchymyn Addysg (Y Cwricwlwm Cenedlaethol) (Ieithoedd Tramor Modern) (Cymru) 2000 (S.I. 2000 Rhif 1980 (Cy. 141 ))
- The Social Security Amendment (Students) Regulations 2000 (S.I. 2000 No. 1981)
- The Social Security (Joint Claims: Consequential Amendments) Regulations 2000 (S.I. 2000 No. 1982)
- The Vaccine Damage Payments Act 1979 Statutory Sum Order 2000 (S.I. 2000 No. 1983)
- The Agricultural Holdings (Units of Production) (England) Order 2000 (S.I. 2000 No. 1984)
- The Immigration and Asylum Act 1999 (Commencement No. 5 and Transitional Provisions) Order 2000 (S.I. 2000 No. 1985 (C. 51)])
- The Environment Act 1995 (Commencement No. 18) (Scotland) Order 2000 (S.I. 2000 No. 1986 (C. 52) (S. 7)])
- The Employment Tribunals (Constitution and Rules of Procedure) (Amendment) Regulations 2000 (S.I. 2000 No. 1987)
- The Employment Tribunals (Constitution and Rules of Procedure) (Scotland) (Amendment) Regulations 2000 (S.I. 2000 No. 1988)
- The National Minimum Wage Regulations 1999 (Amendment) Regulations 2000 (S.I. 2000 No. 1989)
- The National Health Service (General Medical Services) Amendment (No.2) (Wales) Regulations 2000 (S.I. 2000 No. 1992 (W. 144 ))
- Rheoliadau Diwygio (Rhif 2) y Gwasanaeth Iechyd Gwladol (Gwasanaethau Meddygol Cyffredinol) (Cymru) 2000 (S.I. 2000 Rhif 1992 (Cy. 144 ))
- The Social Security Amendment (Personal Allowances for Children) Regulations 2000 (S.I. 2000 No. 1993)
- The Rules of the Air (Amendment) Regulations 2000 (S.I. 2000 No. 1994)
- The Air Navigation (General) (Amendment) Regulations 2000 (S.I. 2000 No. 1995)

== 2001–2100 ==
- The Finance Act 1999, Section 59(3)(b), (Appointed Day) Order 2000 (S.I. 2000 No. 2004 (C.53)])
- The Sea Fishing (Enforcement of Community Quota and Third Country Fishing Measures) (Amendment) Order 2000 (S.I. 2000 No. 2008)
- The Public Contracts (Works, Services and Supply) (Amendment) Regulations 2000 (S.I. 2000 No. 2009)
- The Education Maintenance Allowance (Pilot Areas) Regulations 2000 (S.I. 2000 No. 2012)
- The Police (Amendment) Regulations 2000 (S.I. 2000 No. 2013)
- The North Stoke Primary Care Trust (Establishment) Order 2000 (S.I. 2000 No. 2014)
- The Milton Keynes Primary Care Trust (Establishment) Order 2000 (S.I. 2000 No. 2015)
- The Northern Ireland (Sentences) Act 1998 (Amendment of Section 10) Order 2000 (S.I. 2000 No. 2024)
- The Court of Protection (Amendment) Rules 2000 (S.I. 2000 No. 2025)
- The Community Charges, Council Tax and Non-Domestic Rating (Enforcement) (Magistrates' Courts) (England) Regulations 2000 (S.I. 2000 No. 2026)
- The Sheep and Goats Identification (England) Order 2000 (S.I. 2000 No. 2027)
- The Social Security (Therapeutic Earnings Limits) Amendments Regulations 2000 (S.I. 2000 No. 2028)
- The Undersized Edible Crabs Order 2000 (S.I. 2000 No. 2029)
- The Changing of School Session Times (Wales) Regulations 2000 (S.I. 2000 No. 2030 (W. 143 ))
- Rheoliadau Newid Amserau Sesiynau Ysgolion (Cymru) 2000 (S.I. 2000 Rhif 2030 (Cy. 143 ))
- The Competition Act 1998 (Consequential and Supplemental Provisions) Order 2000 (S.I. 2000 No. 2031)
- The General Medical Council (Voluntary Erasure and Restoration) Regulations Order of Council 2000 (S.I. 2000 No. 2033)
- The General Medical Council (the Professional Conduct Committee, the General Health Committee and theCommittee on Professional Performance) (Amendment) Rules Order of Council 2000 (S.I. 2000 No. 2034)
- The Criminal Appeal (Amendment) Rules 2000 (S.I. 2000 No. 2036)
- The Patents Regulations 2000 (S.I. 2000 No. 2037)
- The Assisted Areas Order 2000 (S.I. 2000 No. 2038)
- The Wireless Telegraphy (Broadband Fixed Wireless Access Licences) Regulations 2000 (S.I. 2000 No. 2039)
- The Scotland Act 1998 (Consequential Modifications) Order 2000 (S.I. 2000 No. 2040)
- The Non-Domestic Rating (Chargeable Amounts) (Amendment) (Wales) Regulations 2000 (S.I. 2000 No. 2041 (W. 147 ))
- Rheoliadau Ardrethu Annomestig (Symiau y Gellir eu Codi) (Diwygio) (Cymru) 2000 (S.I. 2000 Rhif 2041 (Cy. 147 ))
- The Sunderland West Primary Care Trust (Establishment) Order 2000 (S.I. 2000 No. 2042)
- The Dartford, Gravesham and Swanley Primary Care Trust (Establishment) Order 2000 (S.I. 2000 No. 2043)
- The Birmingham Specialist Community Health National Health Service Trust (Establishment) Amendment Order 2000 (S.I. 2000 No. 2044)
- The Ecclesiastical Judges, Legal Officers and Others (Fees) Order 2000 (S.I. 2000 No. 2045)
- The Legal Officers (Annual Fees) Order 2000 (S.I. 2000 No. 2046)
- The Faculty Jurisdiction Rules 2000 (S.I. 2000 No. 2047)
- The Faculty Jurisdiction (Care of Places of Worship) Rules 2000 (S.I. 2000 No. 2048)
- The Parochial Fees Order 2000 (S.I. 2000 No. 2049)
- The Rail Vehicle Accessibility (Connex South Eastern Class 375 Vehicles) Exemption Order 2000 (S.I. 2000 No. 2050)
- The General Medical Council (Fitness to Practise Committees) Rules Order of Council 2000 (S.I. 2000 No. 2051)
- The General Medical Council (Constitution of Interim Orders Committee) Rules Order of Council 2000 (S.I. 2000 No. 2052)
- The General Medical Council (Interim Orders Committee) (Procedure) Rules Order of Council 2000 (S.I. 2000 No. 2053)
- The General Medical Council (Interim Orders Committee) (Transitional Provisions) Rules Order of Council 2000 (S.I. 2000 No. 2054)
- The Brucellosis (England) Order 2000 (S.I. 2000 No. 2055)
- The Enzootic Bovine Leukosis (England) Order 2000 (S.I. 2000 No. 2056)
- The Local Education Authority (Post-Compulsory Education Awards) (Amendment) (England) Regulations 2000 (S.I. 2000 No. 2057)
- The Borough of Nuneaton and Bedworth (Electoral Changes) Order 2000 (S.I. 2000 No. 2058)
- The District of Stratford on Avon (Electoral Changes) Order 2000 (S.I. 2000 No. 2059)
- The Greater London Authority (Protected Information) Order 2000 (S.I. 2000 No. 2060)
- The Donations to Charity by Individuals (Appropriate Declarations) Regulations 2000 (S.I. 2000 No. 2074)
- The Individual Savings Account (Insurance Companies) (Amendment) Regulations 2000 (S.I. 2000 No. 2075)
- The Individual Learning Accounts (Separate Employers Under the Crown) Regulations 2000 (S.I. 2000 No. 2076)
- The Social Security (Contributions) (Amendment No. 7) Regulations 2000 (S.I. 2000 No. 2077)
- The Social Security (Contributions) (Amendment No. 7) (Northern Ireland) Regulations 2000 (S.I. 2000 No. 2078)
- The Individual Savings Account (Amendment No. 2) Regulations 2000 (S.I. 2000 No. 2079)
- The Income Tax (Benefits in Kind) (Exemption for Welfare Counselling) Regulations 2000 (S.I. 2000 No. 2080)
- The Research and Development (Prescribed Activities) Regulations 2000 (S.I. 2000 No. 2081)
- The Finance Act 2000, Section 108(3), (Appointed Day) Order 2000 (S.I. 2000 No. 2082 (C.54)])
- The Charitable Deductions (Approved Schemes) (Amendment No. 2) Regulations 2000 (S.I. 2000 No. 2083)
- The Social Security (Contributions) (Amendment No. 6) Regulations 2000 (S.I. 2000 No. 2084)
- The Housing Benefit and Council Tax Benefit (General) Amendment (No. 3) Regulations 2000 (S.I. 2000 No. 2085)
- The Social Security (Contributions) (Amendment No. 6) (Northern Ireland) Regulations 2000 (S.I. 2000 No. 2086)
- The Export and Investment Guarantees (Limit on Foreign Currency Commitments) Order 2000 (S.I. 2000 No. 2087)
- The Supply of New Cars Order 2000 (S.I. 2000 No. 2088)
- The Insurance Companies (Overseas Life Assurance Business) (Excluded Business) Regulations 2000 (S.I. 2000 No. 2089)
- The Employee Share Ownership Plans (Partnership Shares—Notice of Effects on Benefits, Statutory Sick Pay and Statutory Maternity Pay) Regulations 2000 (S.I. 2000 No. 2090)
- The Youth Justice and Criminal Evidence Act 1999 (Commencement No. 4) Order 2000 (S.I. 2000 No. 2091 (c. 55)])
- The Civil Procedure (Amendment No. 4) Rules 2000 (S.I. 2000 No. 2092 (L.16)])
- The Crown Court (Amendment) Rules 2000 (S.I. 2000 No. 2093 (L. 17)])
- The Costs in Criminal Cases (General) (Amendment) Regulations 2000 (S.I. 2000 No. 2094)

== 2101–2200 ==
- The Portsmouth (Tall Ships Berths) Harbour Revision Order 2000 (S.I. 2000 No. 2103)
- The Insurance Companies (Overseas Life Assurance Business) (Compliance) (Amendment) Regulations 2000 (S.I. 2000 No. 2104)
- The Foreign Package Holidays (Tour Operators and Travel Agents) Order 2000 (S.I. 2000 No. 2110)
- The Education (Assisted Places) (Amendment) (England) Regulations 2000 (S.I. 2000 No. 2111)
- The Education (Assisted Places) (Incidental Expenses) (Amendment) (England) Regulations 2000 (S.I. 2000 No. 2112)
- The Education (Grants) (Music, Ballet and Choir Schools) (Amendment) (England) Regulations 2000 (S.I. 2000 No. 2113)
- The Learning and Skills Act 2000 (Commencement No. 1) Order 2000 (S.I. 2000 No. 2114 (C.56)])
- The Education (Grants) (Wells Cathedral School) Regulations 2000 (S.I. 2000 No. 2115)
- The Education (School Performance Information) (England) (Amendment No. 2) Regulations 2000 (S.I. 2000 No. 2116)
- The Learning and Skills Council for England (Interim Functions) Order 2000 (S.I. 2000 No. 2117)
- The A1 Trunk Road (Barnet) Red Route (Clearway) Traffic Order 1996 Variation Order 2000 (S.I. 2000 No. 2118)
- The Evaluation of Active Substances for Pesticides (Fees) Regulations 2000 (S.I. 2000 No. 2119)
- The Road Traffic (Permitted Parking Area and Special Parking Area) (County of Kent) (Borough of Tonbridge and Malling) Order 2000 (S.I. 2000 No. 2120)
- The Education (National Curriculum) (Temporary Exceptions for Individual Pupils) (England) Regulations 2000 (S.I. 2000 No. 2121)
- The Education (School Government) (Terms of Reference) (England) Regulations 2000 (S.I. 2000 No. 2122)
- The Education (Mandatory Awards) Regulations 2000 (S.I. 2000 No. 2123)
- The Melton Mowbray College (Dissolution) Order 2000 (S.I. 2000 No. 2124)
- The Football (Disorder) Act 2000 (Commencement) Order 2000 (S.I. 2000 No. 2125 (C. 57)])
- The Football Spectators (Prescription) Order 2000 (S.I. 2000 No. 2126)
- The Football (Disorder) (Legal Advice and Assistance) Order 2000 (S.I. 2000 No. 2127)
- The Transport for London (Disposal of Lots Road Power Station) (Consent) Order 2000 (S.I. 2000 No. 2128)
- The Tonnage Tax (Training Requirement) Regulations 2000 (S.I. 2000 No. 2129)
- The Export of Goods (Control) (Amendment No. 4) Order 2000 (S.I. 2000 No. 2140)
- The General Medical Council (Registration (Fees) (Amendment) Regulations) Order of Council 2000 (S.I. 2000 No. 2141)
- The Education (Student Support) Regulations 2000 (Amendment) (No. 2) Regulations 2000 (S.I. 2000 No. 2142)
- The Further Education Funding Council for England (Supplementary Functions) (Amendment) Order 2000 (S.I. 2000 No. 2143)
- The Education (Grants) (Dance and Drama) (England) Regulations 2000 (S.I. 2000 No. 2144)
- Wiltshire College (Incorporation) Order 2000 (S.I. 2000 No. 2145)
- The Individual Learning Accounts (England) Regulations 2000 (S.I. 2000 No. 2146)
- The Antarctic (Amendment) Regulations 2000 (S.I. 2000 No. 2147)
- The Code of Conduct (Magistrates' Courts Committees and Selection Panels) Order 2000 (S.I. 2000 No. 2148)
- The Greater London Magistrates' Courts Authority (Constitution) (Amendment) Regulations 2000 (S.I. 2000 No. 2149)
- The Dartford-Thurrock Crossing Tolls Order 2000 (S.I. 2000 No. 2150)
- The Dartford-Thurrock Crossing (Amendment) Regulations 2000 (S.I. 2000 No. 2151)
- The Burry Port Harbour Revision Order 2000 (S.I. 2000 No. 2152)
- The Torbay Primary Care Trust (Establishment) Order 2000 (S.I. 2000 No. 2154)
- The Bournemouth Primary Care Trust (Establishment) Order 2000 (S.I. 2000 No. 2155)
- The South Hams and West Devon Primary Care Trust (Establishment) Order 2000 (S.I. 2000 No. 2156)
- The North Dorset Primary Care Trust (Establishment) Order 2000 (S.I. 2000 No. 2157)
- The Carrick Primary Care Trust (Establishment) Order 2000 (S.I. 2000 No. 2158)
- The Road Traffic (Permitted Parking Area and Special Parking Area) (Metropolitan Borough of Bolton) Order 2000 (S.I. 2000 No. 2169)
- The Training Programmes (Cessation of Funding) (Prescribed Actions) Order 2000 (S.I. 2000 No. 2170)
- The Education (Induction Arrangements for School Teachers) (Amendment No. 3) (England) Regulations 2000 (S.I. 2000 No. 2171)
- The Kingsway: Camden's College (Dissolution) Order 2000 (S.I. 2000 No. 2172)
- The Wiltshire College (Government) Regulations 2000 (S.I. 2000 No.2173)
- Teacher Training Agency (Additional Functions) (No. 2) Order 2000 (S.I. 2000 No. 2174)
- The General Teaching Council for England (Additional Functions) Order 2000 (S.I. 2000 No. 2175)
- The General Teaching Council for England (Registration of Teachers) Regulations 2000 (S.I. 2000 No. 2176)
- The Local Government Act 2000 (Commencement No. 1) Order 2000 (S.I. 2000 No. 2187 (C. 58)])
- The Overseas Life Assurance Fund (Amendment) Order 2000 (S.I. 2000 No. 2188)
- The Tax Credits Schemes (Miscellaneous Amendments No. 3) (Northern Ireland) Regulations 2000 (S.I. 2000 No. 2189)
- The Transport and Works (Applications and Objections Procedure) (England and Wales) Rules 2000 (S.I. 2000 No. 2190)
- The Education (Fees and Awards) (Amendment) (England) Regulations 2000 (S.I. 2000 No. 2192)
- The Education (Bursaries for School Teacher Training Pilot Scheme) (England) Regulations 2000 (S.I. 2000 No. 2193)
- The Jobseeker's Allowance (Amendment) (No. 3) Regulations 2000 (S.I. 2000 No. 2194)
- The Education (Change of Category of Maintained Schools) (England Regulations 2000 (S.I. 2000 No.2195)
- The Education (London Residuary Body) (Property Transfer) (Amendment) Order 2000 (S.I. 2000 No. 2196)
- The Education (Student Support) (European Institutions) Regulations 2000 (S.I. 2000 No. 2197)
- The Education (School Organisation Proposals) (England) (Amendment) Regulations 2000 (S.I. 2000 No. 2198)
- The Teaching and Higher Education Act 1998 (Commencement No. 7) Order 2000 (S.I. 2000 No. 2199 (C.59))

== 2201–2300 ==
- The Social Security (Contributions) (Amendment No. 8) Regulations 2000 (S.I. 2000 No. 2207)
- The Social Security (Contributions) (Amendment No. 8) (Northern Ireland) Regulations 2000 (S.I. 2000 No. 2208)
- The Fugitive Offenders (Forms) (Amendment) Regulations 2000 (S.I. 2000 No. 2210)
- The Financial Assistance for Environmental Purposes (No. 2) Order 2000 (S.I. 2000 No. 2211)
- The Land Registration (Conduct of Business) Regulations 2000 (S.I. 2000 No. 2212)
- The Land Registration (Hearings Procedure) Rules 2000 (S.I. 2000 No. 2213)
- The Land Registration (No. 2) Rules 2000 (S.I. 2000 No. 2214)
- The Meat (Disease Control) (England) Regulations 2000 (S.I. 2000 No. 2215)
- The Late Payment of Commercial Debts (Interest) Act 1998 (Commencement No. 3) Order 2000 (S.I. 2000 No. 2225 (C. 60)])
- The Legal Aid in Criminal and Care Proceedings (General) (Amendment) (No. 3) Regulations 2000 (S.I. 2000 No. 2226)
- The Legal Aid Act 1988 (Modification) Regulations 2000 (S.I. 2000 No. 2227)
- The Courts-Martial Appeal (Amendment) Rules 2000 (S.I. 2000 No. 2228 (L.18)])
- The Social Fund Winter Fuel Payment and Maternity and Funeral Expenses (General) Amendment Regulations 2000 (S.I. 2000 No. 2229)
- The Sea Fishing (Enforcement of Community Conservation Measures) (Wales) Order 2000 (S.I. 2000 No. 2230 (W. 148))
- Gorchymyn Pysgota Môr (Gorfodi Mesurau Cadwraeth y Gymuned) (Cymru) 2000 (S.I. 2000 Rhif 2230 (Cy. 148 ))
- The Road Traffic Regulation Act 1984 (GLA Side Roads Amendment) Order 2000 (S.I. 2000 No. 2237)
- The Commission Areas (North Wales) Order 2000 (S.I. 2000 No. 2238)
- The Social Security Amendment (Bereavement Benefits) Regulations 2000 (S.I. 2000 No. 2239)
- The Education (Grants) (Dance and Drama) (England) (Amendment) Regulations 2000 (S.I. 2000 No. 2240)
- The Employment Code of Practice (Industrial Action Ballots and Notice to Employers) Order 2000 (S.I. 2000 No. 2241)
- The Employment Relations Act 1999 (Commencement No. 7 and Transitional Provisions) Order 2000 (S.I. 2000 No. 2242 (C. 61)])
- The Immigration (Removal Directions) Regulations 2000 (S.I. 2000 No. 2243)
- The Immigration and Asylum Appeals (One-Stop Procedure) Regulations 2000 (S.I. 2000 No. 2244)
- The Asylum (Designated Safe Third Countries) Order 2000 (S.I. 2000 No. 2245)
- The Immigration and Asylum Appeals (Notices) Regulations 2000 (S.I. 2000 No. 2246)
- The Employment Code of Practice (Disciplinary and Grievance Procedures) Order 2000 (S.I. 2000 No. 2247)
- The Medicines (Products for Animal Use—Fees) (Amendment) Regulations 2000 (S.I. 2000 No. 2250)
- The Portsmouth (Millennium Waterbus Landing Stages) Harbour Revision Order 2000 (S.I. 2000 No. 2251)
- The Audit Commission Act 1998 (Publication of Information as to Standards of Performance) (Variation) (England) Order 2000 (S.I. 2000 No. 2253)
- The Food Irradiation Provisions (England) Regulations 2000 (S.I. 2000 No. 2254)
- The Milford Haven Port Authority Harbour Revision Order 2000 (S.I. 2000 No. 2255)
- The Meat (Disease Control) (Wales) Regulations 2000 (S.I. 2000 No. 2257 (W. 150 ))
- Rheoliadau Cig (Rheoli Clefydau) (Cymru) 2000 (S.I. 2000 Rhif 2257 (Cy. 150 ))
- The Export of Goods (Control) (Amendment No. 5) Order 2000 (S.I. 2000 No. 2264)
- The General Chiropractic Council (Appeals Against Decisions of the Registrar) Rules Order 2000 (S.I. 2000 No. 2265)
- The Animals and Animal Products (Import and Export) (England and Wales) (Amendment) Regulations 2000 (S.I. 2000 No. 2266)
- The Family Proceedings (Amendment) Rules 2000 (S.I. 2000 No. 2267 (L.19))

== 2301–2400 ==
- Water Supply and Sewerage Services (Customer Service Standards) (Amendment) Regulations 2000 (S.I. 2000 No. 2301)
- The Tonnage Tax Regulations 2000 (S.I. 2000 No. 2303)
- The Fees for Inquiries (Standard Daily Amount) (England) Regulations 2000 (S.I. 2000 No. 2307)
- The County Court Fees (Amendment No. 4) Order 2000 (S.I. 2000 No. 2310 (L. 20)])
- The Town and Country Planning (Costs of Inquiries etc.) (Examination in Public) (England) Regulations 2000 (S.I. 2000 No. 2311)
- The West Yorkshire Metropolitan Ambulance Service National Health Service Trust (Establishment) Amendment Order 2000 (S.I. 2000 No. 2312)
- The Social Security (Attendance Allowance and Disability Living Allowance) (Amendment) (No. 2) Regulations 2000 (S.I. 2000 No. 2313)
- The Personal Pension Schemes (Restriction on Discretion to Approve) (Establishment of Schemes under Trusts) Regulations 2000 (S.I. 2000 No. 2314)
- The Personal Pension Schemes (Relief at Source) (Amendment) Regulations 2000 (S.I. 2000 No. 2315)
- The Personal Pension Schemes (Information Powers) Regulations 2000 (S.I. 2000 No. 2316)
- The Personal Pension Schemes (Establishment of Schemes) Order 2000 (S.I. 2000 No. 2317)
- The Personal Pension Schemes (Concurrent Membership) Order 2000 (S.I. 2000 No. 2318)
- The Finance Act 1998, Section 96(4),(Appointed Day) Order 2000 (S.I. 2000 No. 2319 (C. 62)])
- The Offshore Installations (Safety Zones) (No. 2) Order 2000 (S.I. 2000 No. 2320)
- The Education (School Teachers' Pay and Conditions) (No. 3) Order 2000 (S.I. 2000 No. 2321)
- The Motor Vehicles (Tests) (Amendment) (No. 2) Regulations 2000 (S.I. 2000 No. 2322)
- The School Teachers' Remuneration Order 2000 (S.I. 2000 No. 2324)
- Immigration (European Economic Area) Regulations 2000 (S.I. 2000 No. 2326)
- The Rail Vehicle Accessibility (Gatwick Express Class 460 Vehicles) Exemption (Amendment) Order 2000 (S.I. 2000 No. 2327)
- The Legal Aid in Criminal and Care Proceedings (General) (Amendment No. 4) Regulations 2000 (S.I. 2000 No. 2328)
- The Football (Offences) (Designation of Football Matches) Order 2000 (S.I. 2000 No. 2329)
- The Education (Grants for Disabled Postgraduate Students) Regulations 2000 (S.I. 2000 No. 2330)
- The Housing Benefit and Council Tax Benefit (General) Amendment (No. 4) Regulations 2000 (S.I. 2000 No. 2331)
- The Education Standards Fund (England) (Amendment) Regulations 2000 (S.I. 2000 No. 2332)
- The Immigration and Asylum Appeals (Procedure) Rules 2000 (S.I. 2000 No. 2333 (L. 21)])
- Consumer Protection (Distance Selling) Regulations 2000 (S.I. 2000 No. 2334)
- The Sheep and Goats Identification (Wales) Regulations 2000 (S.I. 2000 No. 2335 (W. 152))
- Rheoliadau Adnabod Defaid a Geifr (Cymru) 2000 (S.I. 2000 Rhif 2335 (Cy. 152))
- The Social Security (Payments on account, Overpayments and Recovery) Amendment Regulations 2000 (S.I. 2000 No. 2336)
- The Protection of Children Act 1999 (Commencement No. 2) Order 2000 (S.I. 2000 No. 2337 (C. 63)])
- The Birmingham North East Primary Care Trust (Establishment) Order 2000 (S.I. 2000 No. 2338)
- The Greater Yardley Primary Care Trust (Establishment) Order 2000 (S.I. 2000 No. 2339)
- The Income-related Benefits (Subsidy to Authorities) Amendment (No. 2) Order 2000 (S.I. 2000 No. 2340)
- The National Health Service (Clinical Negligence Scheme) Amendment Regulations 2000 (S.I. 2000 No. 2341)
- The National Health Service (Property Expenses Scheme) Amendment Regulations 2000 (S.I. 2000 No. 2342)
- The Social Security (Contributions) (Amendment No. 9) Regulations 2000 (S.I. 2000 No. 2343)
- The Social Security (Contributions) (Amendment No. 9) (Northern Ireland) Regulations 2000 (S.I. 2000 No. 2344)
- The Armed Forces Discipline Act 2000 (Commencement and Transitional Provisions) Order 2000 (S.I. 2000 No. 2366 (C.64)])
- The Naval Custody Rules 2000 (S.I. 2000 No. 2367)
- The Army Custody Rules 2000 (S.I. 2000 No. 2368)
- The Air Force Custody Rules 2000 (S.I. 2000 No. 2369)
- The Summary Appeal Court (Navy) Rules 2000 (S.I. 2000 No. 2370)
- The Summary Appeal Court (Army) Rules 2000 (S.I. 2000 No. 2371)
- The Summary Appeal Court (Air Force) Rules 2000 (S.I. 2000 No. 2372)
- The Courts-Martial (Royal Navy) (Amendment) Rules 2000 (S.I. 2000 No. 2373)
- The Courts-Martial (Army) (Amendment) Rules 2000 (S.I. 2000 No. 2374)
- The Courts-Martial (Royal Air Force) (Amendment) Rules 2000 (S.I. 2000 No. 2375)
- The Administration of Oaths (Summary Appeal Court) (Navy) Order 2000 (S.I. 2000 No. 2376)
- The Administration of Oaths (Summary Appeal Court) (Army) Order 2000 (S.I. 2000 No. 2377)
- The Administration of Oaths (Summary Appeal Court) (Air Force) Order 2000 (S.I. 2000 No. 2378)
- The Reserve Forces Act 1996 (Reserve Associations) Order 2000 (S.I. 2000 No. 2379)
- The Construction (Design and Management) (Amendment) Regulations 2000 (S.I. 2000 No. 2380)
- The Chemicals (Hazard Information and Packaging for Supply) (Amendment) Regulations 2000 (S.I. 2000 No. 2381)
- The Supreme Court Fees (Amendment No. 4) Order 2000 (S.I. 2000 No. 2382 (L. 22 )])
- The National Health Service (General Medical Services) Amendment (No. 4) Regulations 2000 (S.I. 2000 No. 2383)
- The Children (Performances) (Amendment) (No. 2) Regulations 2000 (S.I. 2000 No. 2384)
- The National Health Service (Liabilities to Third Parties Scheme) Amendment Regulations 2000 (S.I. 2000 No. 2385)
- The Medicines (Data Sheets for Veterinary Drugs) Regulations 2000 (S.I. 2000 No. 2386)
- The West Suffolk Hospitals National Health Service Trust (Establishment) Amendment Order 2000 (S.I. 2000 No. 2387)
- The Chiropractors Act 1994 (Commencement No. 4) Order 2000 (S.I. 2000 No. 2388 (C. 65)])
- The King's Healthcare National Health Service Trust (Change of Name) Order 2000 (S.I. 2000 No. 2389)
- The Harbour Works (Environmental Impact Assessment) (Amendment) Regulations 2000 (S.I. 2000 No. 2391)
- The Morecambe Bay Primary Care Trust (Establishment) Order 2000 (S.I. 2000 No. 2392)
- The National Health Service (Charges for Drugs and Appliances) Amendment Regulations 2000 (S.I. 2000 No. 2393)
- The Swine Fever (Movement Restriction Areas) Order 2000 (S.I. 2000 No. 2394)
- The Rail Vehicle Accessibility (The Chiltern Railway Company Limited Class 168/1 Vehicles) Exemption (No. 2) Order 2000 (S.I. 2000 No. 2397)
- The Rail Vehicle Accessibility (South West Trains Class 458 Vehicles) Exemption (Amendment) Order 2000 (S.I. 2000 No. 2398)

== 2401–2500 ==
- The Gaming Duty (Amendment) Regulations 2000 (S.I. 2000 No. 2408)
- The Wireless Telegraphy (Interception and Disclosure of Messages) (Designation) Regulations 2000 (S.I. 2000 No. 2409)
- The Telecommunications (Services for Disabled Persons) Regulations 2000 (S.I. 2000 No. 2410)
- The Utilities Act 2000 (Commencement No. 1 and Saving) Order 2000 (S.I. 2000 No. 2412 (C. 67)])
- The Companies (Welsh Language Forms) (Amendment) Regulations 2000 (S.I. 2000 No. 2413)])
- Rheoliadau (Diwygio) (Ffurflenni Cymraeg) Cwmnïau 2000 (S.I. 2000 Rhif 2413))
- The Regulation of Investigatory Powers (Prescription of Offices, Ranks and Positions) Order 2000 (S.I. 2000 No. 2417)
- The Regulation of Investigatory Powers (Authorisations Extending to Scotland) Order 2000 (S.I. 2000 No. 2418)
- Education (Restriction of Employment) Regulations 2000 (S.I. 2000 No. 2419)
- Local Government Act 2000 (Commencement No. 2) Order 2000 (S.I. 2000 No. 2420 (C. 66)])
- The Non-Domestic Rating (Telecommunications Apparatus) (England) Regulations 2000 (S.I. 2000 No. 2421)
- The Social Security (Students and Income-related Benefits) (No. 2) Regulations 2000 (S.I. 2000 No. 2422)
- The Crown Prosecution Service Inspectorate Act 2000 (Commencement) Order 2000 (S.I. 2000 No. 2423 (C.68)])
- The Electricity (Class Exemptions from the Requirement for a Licence) (Amendment) (England and Wales) Order 2000 (S.I. 2000 No. 2424)
- The Road Traffic (Permitted Parking Area and Special Parking Area) (County of Kent) (Borough of Ashford) Order 2000 (S.I. 2000 No. 2430)
- The Teachers' Pensions (Amendment No. 2) Regulations 2000 (S.I. 2000 No. 2431)
- The Protection of Children (Child Care Organisations) Regulations 2000 (S.I. 2000 No. 2432)
- The National Health Service Litigation Authority (Amendment) Regulations 2000 (S.I. 2000 No. 2433)
- The National Health Service Trusts (Membership and Procedure) Amendment (England) Regulations 2000 (S.I. 2000 No. 2434)
- The Ashworth, Broadmoor and Rampton Hospital Authorities (Functions and Membership) Amendment Regulations 2000 (S.I. 2000 No. 2435)
- The Immigration and Asylum Act 1999 (Commencement No. 6, Transitional and Consequential Provisions) Order 2000 (S.I. 2000 No. 2444 (C.69)])
- The Immigration (Variation of Leave) (Amendment) Order 2000 (S.I. 2000 No. 2445)
- The Immigration Appeals (Family Visitor) (No. 2) Regulations 2000 (S.I. 2000 No. 2446)
- The Energy Act 1976 (Reserve Powers) Order 2000 (S.I. 2000 No. 2449)
- The National Health Service (General Dental Services) Amendment Regulations 2000 (S.I. 2000 No. 2459)
- The Swine Fever (Movement Restriction Areas) (Amendment) Order 2000 (S.I. 2000 No. 2460)
- The Time Off for Public Duties (No. 2) Order 2000 (S.I. 2000 No. 2463)
- The Feeding Stuffs Regulations 2000 (S.I. 2000 No. 2481)
- The Health and Safety (Fees) Regulations 2000 (S.I. 2000 No. 2482)
- The Community Drivers' Hours (Passenger and Goods Vehicles) (Temporary Exception) Regulations 2000 (S.I. 2000 No. 2483)
- The Motor Fuel (Designated Filling Stations and Fuel Depots) Order 2000 (S.I. 2000 No. 2484)
- The County of Cumbria (Electoral Changes) Order 2000 (S.I. 2000 No. 2485)
- The County of Cheshire (Electoral Changes) Order 2000 (S.I. 2000 No. 2486)
- The County of Hertfordshire (Electoral Changes) Order 2000 (S.I. 2000 No. 2487)
- The County of Lincolnshire (Electoral Changes) Order 2000 (S.I. 2000 No. 2488)
- The County of Northamptonshire (Electoral Changes) Order 2000 (S.I. 2000 No. 2489)
- The County of Northumberland (Electoral Changes) Order 2000 (S.I. 2000 No. 2490)
- The County of Somerset (Electoral Changes) Order 2000 (S.I. 2000 No. 2491)
- The Local Authorities (Members' Allowances) (Amendment) (Wales) Regulations 2000 (S.I. 2000 No. 2492 (W. 159 ))
- Rheoliadau Awdurdodau Lleol (Lwfansau Aelodau) (Diwygio) (Cymru) 2000 (S.I. 2000 Rhif 2492 (Cy. 159 ))
- The GLA Roads and Side Roads (Transfer of Property etc.) (Modification) (College Farm, Finchley) Order 2000 (S.I. 2000 No. 2493)
- The Medicines (Sale or Supply) (Miscellaneous Provisions) Amendment (No. 3) Regulations 2000 (S.I. 2000 No. 2494)

== 2501–2600 ==
- The Liquid and Gaseous Fuel (Designated Filling Stations and Fuel Depots) Order 2000 (S.I. 2000 No. 2522)
- The Liquid and Gaseous Fuel (Designated Filling Stations and Fuel Depots) (No. 2) Order 2000 (S.I. 2000 No. 2523)
- The Animals and Animal Products (Import and Export) (England and Wales) (Amendment) (No. 1) Regulations 2000 (S.I. 2000 No. 2524)
- The Medicines (Products Other Than Veterinary Drugs) (General Sale List) Amendment (No. 2) Order 2000 (S.I. 2000 No. 2526)
- The Liquid and Gaseous Fuel (Designated Filling Stations and Fuel Depots) (No. 3) Order 2000 (S.I. 2000 No. 2530)
- The Building Regulations 2000 (S.I. 2000 No. 2531)
- The Building (Approved Inspectors etc.) Regulations 2000 (S.I. 2000 No. 2532)
- The Liquid and Gaseous Fuel (Designated Filling Stations and Fuel Depots) (No. 4) Order 2000 (S.I. 2000 No. 2533)
- The Road Traffic (Permitted Parking Area and Special Parking Area) (District of York) Order 2000 (S.I. 2000 No. 2534)
- The Liquid and Gaseous Fuel (Designated Filling Stations and Fuel Depots) (No. 5) Order 2000 (S.I. 2000 No. 2535)
- The Protection of Children (Access to Lists) (Prescribed Individuals) Regulations 2000 (S.I. 2000 No. 2537)
- The National Council for Education and Training for Wales (Interim Functions) Order 2000 (S.I. 2000 No. 2539 (W. 162))
- Gorchymyn Cyngor Cenedlaethol Cymru dros Addysg a Hyfforddiant (Swyddogaethau Interim) 2000 (S.I. 2000 Rhif 2539 (Cy.162))
- The Learning and Skills Act 2000 (Commencement No.1) (Wales) Order 2000 (S.I. 2000 No.2540 (W.163) (C.70))
- Gorchymyn Deddf Dysgu a Medrau 2000 (Cychwyn Rhif 1) (Cymru) 2000 (S.I. 2000 Rhif 2540 (Cy.163) (C.70))
- The Regulation of Investigatory Powers Act 2000 (Commencement No. 1 and Transitional Provisions) Order 2000 (S.I. 2000 No. 2543 (C. 71)])
- The Care Standards Act 2000 (Commencement No. 1) Order 2000 (S.I. 2000 No. 2544 (C. 72)])
- The Social Security Amendment (Capital Limitsand Earnings Disregards) Regulations 2000 (S.I. 2000 No. 2545)
- The Road Traffic (Owner Liability) Regulations 2000 (S.I. 2000 No. 2546)
- The North Hampshire Primary Care Trust (Establishment) Order 2000 (S.I. 2000 No. 2547)
- The Children (Protection at Work) (No. 2) Regulations 2000 (S.I. 2000 No. 2548)
- The Stamp Duty and Stamp Duty Reserve Tax (Definitions of Unit Trust Scheme) (Amendment) Regulations 2000 (S.I. 2000 No. 2549)
- The Capital Gains Tax (Definition of Unit Trust Scheme) (Amendment) Regulations 2000 (S.I. 2000 No. 2550)
- The Income Tax (Definition of Unit Trust Scheme) (Amendment) Regulations 2000 (S.I. 2000 No. 2551)
- The Local Government Pension Scheme (Management and Investment of Funds) (Amendment) Regulations 2000 (S.I. 2000 No. 2552)
- The Herefordshire Primary Care Trust (Establishment) Amendment Order 2000 (S.I. 2000 No. 2553)
- The Nurses, Midwives and Health Visitors (Training) Amendment Rules Approval Order 2000 (S.I. 2000 No. 2554)
- The Merchant Shipping (Life-Saving Appliances for Ships Other Than Ships of Classes III to VI(A)) (Amendment) Regulations 2000 (S.I. 2000 No. 2558)
- The Learning and Skills Act (Commencement No. 2 and Savings) Order 2000 (S.I. 2000 No. 2559 (C. 73)])
- The Teacher Training Incentive (Wales) Regulations 2000 (S.I. 2000 No. 2560 (W. 169 ))
- Rheoliadau Cymhellion Hyfforddi Athrawon (Cymru) 2000 (S.I. 2000 Rhif 2560 (Cy. 169 ))
- The West London Mental Health National Health Service Trust (Establishment) Order 2000 (S.I. 2000 No. 2562)
- The Regulation of Investigatory Powers (Notification of Authorisations etc.) Order 2000 (S.I. 2000 No. 2563)
- The Merger Reference (Interbrew SA and Bass PLC) (Interim Provision) Order 2000 (S.I. 2000 No. 2566)
- The Integrated Administration and Control System (Amendment) Regulations 2000 (S.I. 2000 No. 2573)
- The South Manchester Primary Care Trust (Establishment) Amendment Order 2000 (S.I. 2000 No. 2576)
- Great Central Railway (East Leake Branch, etc.) Order 2000 (SI 2000/2585)
- The District of Craven (Electoral Changes) Order 2000 (S.I. 2000 No. 2599)
- The District of Hambleton (Electoral Changes) Order 2000 (S.I. 2000 No. 2600)

== 2601–2700 ==
- The Borough of Harrogate (Electoral Changes) Order 2000 (S.I. 2000 No. 2601)
- The District of Richmondshire (Electoral Changes) Order 2000 (S.I. 2000 No. 2602)
- The District of Ryedale (Electoral Changes) Order 2000 (S.I. 2000 No. 2603)
- The Borough of Scarborough (Electoral Changes) Order 2000 (S.I. 2000 No. 2604)
- The District of Selby (Electoral Changes) Order 2000 (S.I. 2000 No. 2605)
- The Isle of Wight (Electoral Changes) Order 2000 (S.I. 2000 No. 2606)
- The GLA Roads (Continuity of Orders etc.) Order 2000 (S.I. 2000 No. 2615)
- The Export of Goods (Control) (Amendment No. 6) Order 2000 (S.I. 2000 No. 2618)
- Protection of Children Act Tribunal Regulations 2000 (S.I. 2000 No. 2619)
- The Dual-Use Items (Export Control) Regulations 2000 (S.I. 2000 No. 2620)
- The Social Security Amendment (Enhanced Disability Premium) Regulations 2000 (S.I. 2000 No. 2629)
- Hartlepool Water (Amendment of Local Enactments) Order 2000 (S.I. 2000 No. 2630)
- North Surrey Water (Amendment of Local Enactments) Order 2000 (S.I. 2000 No. 2631)
- The Prison (Amendment) (No. 2) Rules 2000 (S.I. 2000 No. 2641)
- The Young Offender Institution (Amendment) (No. 3) Rules 2000 (S.I. 2000 No. 2642)
- The A66 Trunk Road (Sadberge Grade Separated Junction, Slip Road) Order 2000 (S.I. 2000 No. 2649)
- The Community Drivers' Hours (Passenger and Goods Vehicles) (Temporary Exception) (Amendment) Regulations 2000 (S.I. 2000 No. 2658)
- The Specified Risk Material (Amendment) (Wales) Regulations 2000 (S.I. 2000 No. 2659 (W. 172 ))
- Rheoliadau Deunydd Risg Penodedig (Diwygio) (Cymru) 2000 (S.I. 2000 Rhif 2659 (Cy. 172 ))
- The A30 Trunk Road (Honiton to Exeter Improvement) (Detrunking) (No. 2) Order 2000 (S.I. 2000 No. 2660)
- The A30 Trunk Road (Honiton to Exeter Improvement) (Trunking Part of A3015) Order 2000 (S.I. 2000 No. 2661)
- The Milton Keynes Community Health National Health Service Trust (Dissolution) Order 2000 (S.I. 2000 No. 2662)
- The Aylesbury Vale Community Healthcare National Health Service Trust (Establishment) Amendment Order 2000 (S.I. 2000 No. 2663)
- The Investigatory Powers Tribunal Rules 2000 (S.I. 2000 No. 2665)
- The Child Support, Pensions and Social Security Act 2000 (Commencement No. 1) Order 2000 (S.I. 2000 No. 2666 (C. 74)])
- The Children (Allocation of Proceedings) (Amendment) Order 2000 (S.I. 2000 No. 2670)
- The Commission Areas (Devon and Cornwall) Order 2000 (S.I. 2000 No. 2671)
- The Specified Risk Material (Amendment) (England) Regulations 2000 (S.I. 2000 No. 2672)
- The Finance Act 2000, section 5, (Appointed Day) Order 2000 (S.I. 2000 No. 2674 (C. 75)])
- The Liquid and Gaseous Fuel (Designated Filling Stations and Fuel Depots) (No. 5) (Revocation) Order 2000 (S.I. 2000 No. 2676)
- The Medicines (Exemptions for Merchants in Veterinary Drugs) (Amendment) Order 2000 (S.I. 2000 No. 2686)
- The Merchant Shipping (Passenger Ships on Domestic Voyages) Regulations 2000 (S.I. 2000 No. 2687)
- The Railways (Safety Case) Regulations 2000 (S.I. 2000 No. 2688)
- The Lowestoft Primary Care Trust (Establishment) Order 2000 (S.I. 2000 No. 2689)
- The Social Fund Cold Weather Payments (General) Amendment Regulations 2000 (S.I. 2000 No. 2690)
- The Pension Sharing (Consequential and Miscellaneous Amendments) Regulations 2000 (S.I. 2000 No. 2691)
- The Personal Pension Schemes (Payments by Employers) Regulations 2000 (S.I. 2000 No. 2692)
- The Sharing of State Scheme Rights (Provision of Information and Valuation) Regulations 2000 (S.I. 2000 No. 2693)
- The A249 Trunk Road (Iwade Bypass to Queenborough Improvement) (Detrunking) Order 2000 (S.I. 2000 No. 2694)
- The A249 Trunk Road (Iwade Bypass to Neatscourt Roundabout and Bridge) Order 2000 (S.I. 2000 No. 2695)
- The A249 Trunk Road (Iwade Bypass to Queenborough Improvement) (Slip Roads) Order 2000 (S.I. 2000 No. 2696)
- The Immigration and Asylum Act 1999 (Commencement No. 7) Order 2000 (S.I. 2000 No. 2698 (C. 76)])
- The Telecommunications (Lawful Business Practice) (Interception of Communications) Regulations 2000 (S.I. 2000 No. 2699)}

== 2701–2800 ==
- The Education (Teachers' Qualifications and Health Standards) (England) (Amendment) Regulations 2000 (S.I. 2000 No. 2704)
- The M65 Motorway (Junction 1A) (Speed Limit) Regulations 2000 (S.I. 2000 No. 2705)
- The Assured and Protected Tenancies (Lettings to Students) (Amendment) (England) Regulations 2000 (S.I. 2000 No. 2706)
- The Essex County Council (Mayrose Bridge) Scheme 1999 Confirmation Instrument 2000 (S.I. 2000 No. 2707)
- The Friendly Societies (Modification of the Corporation Tax Acts) (Amendment) Regulations 2000 (S.I. 2000 No. 2710)
- The Partnerships (Unrestricted Size) No. 15 Regulations 2000 (S.I. 2000 No. 2711)
- The Immigration (Designation of Travel Bans) Order 2000 (S.I. 2000 No. 2724)
- The Regulation of Investigatory Powers (Source Records) Regulations 2000 (S.I. 2000 No. 2725)
- The Specified Risk Material (Amendment) (England) Order 2000 (S.I. 2000 No. 2726)
- The Electricity from Non-Fossil Fuel Sources Saving Arrangements Order 2000 (S.I. 2000 No. 2727)
- The Chippenham, Lackham and Trowbridge Colleges (Dissolution) Order 2000 (S.I. 2000 No. 2728)
- The Education Transfer Council (Winding up) Regulations 2000 (S.I. 2000 No. 2729)
- The Motor Vehicles (EC Type Approval) (Amendment) (No. 2) Regulations 2000 (S.I. 2000 No. 2730)
- The Immigration Services Commissioner (Registration Fee) Order 2000 (S.I. 2000 No. 2735)
- The Social Security (Contracting-out and Qualifying Earnings Factor and Revision of Relevant Pensions) Regulations 2000 (S.I. 2000 No. 2736)
- The Distress for Rent (Amendment No. 2) Rules 2000 (S.I. 2000 No. 2737 (L.23)])
- The Civil Courts (Amendment No. 2) Order 2000 (S.I. 2000 No. 2738)
- The Immigration Services Tribunal Rules 2000 (S.I. 2000 No. 2739)
- The Late Payment of Commercial Debts (Interest) Act 1998 (Commencement No. 4) Order 2000 (S.I. 2000 No. 2740 (C. 77)])
- The East Gloucestershire National Health Service Trust (Establishment) Amendment Order 2000 (S.I. 2000 No. 2741)
- The Income Tax (Sub-contractors in the Construction Industry and Employments) (Amendment) Regulations 2000 (S.I. 2000 No. 2742)
- The Social Security (Contributions) (Amendment No. 10) (Northern Ireland) Regulations 2000 (S.I. 2000 No. 2743)
- The Social Security (Contributions) (Amendment No. 10) Regulations 2000 (S.I. 2000 No. 2744)
- The County Council of Norfolk (Construction of Old Barge Yard Foot/Cycle Bridge, Norwich) Scheme 2000 Confirmation Instrument 2000 (S.I. 2000 No. 2745)
- The County Council of Norfolk (Construction of Cannon Wharf Foot/Cycle Bridge, Norwich) Scheme 2000 Confirmation Instrument 2000 (S.I. 2000 No. 2746)
- Children's Homes Amendment Regulations 2000 (S.I. 2000 No. 2764)
- The Cosmetic Products (Safety) (Amendment) (No. 2) Regulations 2000 (S.I. 2000 No. 2765)
- The Motor Vehicles (Driving Licences) (Amendment) Regulations 2000 (S.I. 2000 No. 2766)
- The Ecclesiastical Offices (Age Limit) (Channel Islands) Order 2000 (S.I. 2000 No. 2767)
- The Carriage by Air and Road Act 1979 (Commencement No. 4) Order 2000 (S.I. 2000 No. 2768 (C. 78)])
- The Landmines Act 1998 (Guernsey) Order 2000 (S.I. 2000 No. 2769)
- The Landmines Act 1998 (Isle of Man) Order 2000 (S.I. 2000 No. 2770)
- The Consumer Protection Act 1987 (Product Liability) (Modification) Order 2000 (S.I. 2000 No. 2771)
- The Fixed Penalty Order 2000 (S.I. 2000 No. 2792)
- The Regulation of Investigatory Powers (Juveniles) Order 2000 (S.I. 2000 No. 2793)
- The Regulation of Investigatory Powers (Cancellation of Authorisations) Regulations 2000 (S.I. 2000 No. 2794)
- The Care Standards Act 2000 (Commencement No. 1 (England) and Transitional Provisions) Order 2000 (S.I. 2000 No. 2795 (C.79)])
- The Terrorism Act 2000 (Commencement No. 1) Order 2000 (S.I. 2000 No. 2800 (C. 80))

== 2801–2900 ==
- The Education (Funding for Teacher Training) Designation (No. 3) Order 2000 (S.I. 2000 No. 2801)
- The Gaming (Small Charges) Order 2000 (S.I. 2000 No. 2802)
- The Gaming Act (Variation of Monetary Limits) (No. 2) Order 2000 (S.I. 2000 No. 2803)
- The Greater London Magistrates' Courts Authority (Financial Administration) Regulations 2000 (S.I. 2000 No. 2810)
- The Specified Risk Material (Amendment) (Wales) Order 2000 (S.I. 2000 No. 2811)
- The European Communities (Designation) (No. 3) Order 2000 (S.I. 2000 No. 2812)
- The Harlow Primary Care Trust (Establishment) Order 2000 (S.I. 2000 No. 2820)
- The Adoption (Intercountry Aspects) Act 1999 (Commencement No. 3) Order 2000 (S.I. 2000 No. 2821 (C. 81)])
- The Judicial Committee (Chiropractors Rules) Order 2000 (S.I. 2000 No. 2822)
- The Amalgamation of the Alford, Louth and Skegness District Internal Drainage Districts Order 2000 (S.I. 2000 No. 2823)
- The Legal Aid in Criminal and Care Proceedings (General) (Amendment) (No. 5) Regulations 2000 (S.I. 2000 No. 2824)
- The Education (Mandatory Awards) Regulations 2000 (Amendment) Regulations 2000 (S.I. 2000 No. 2825)
- The Local Government Pension Scheme (Merseyside Transport Limited) Regulations 2000 (S.I. 2000 No. 2826)
- The Genetically Modified Organisms(Contained Use) Regulations 2000 (S.I. 2000 No. 2831)
- The Education (School Performance Information) (England) (Amendment No. 3)Regulations 2000 (S.I. 2000 No. 2832)
- The Local Government Act 2000 (Commencement No. 3) Order 2000 (S.I. 2000 No. 2836 (C. 82)])
- The Offshore Installations (Safety Zones) (No. 3) Order 2000 (S.I. 2000 No. 2846)
- The Cribbs Causeway—Easton-in-Gordano Special Roads Scheme 1964 (Variation) Scheme 2000 (S.I. 2000 No. 2847)
- The Local Government Act 2000 (Commencement No. 4) Order 2000 (S.I. 2000 No. 2849 (C. 83)])
- The Local Authorities (Proposals for Alternative Arrangements) (England) Regulations 2000 (S.I. 2000 No. 2850)
- The Local Authorities (Arrangements for the Discharge of Functions) (England) Regulations 2000 (S.I. 2000 No. 2851)
- The Local Authorities (Referendums) (Petitions and Directions) (England) Regulations 2000 (S.I. 2000 No. 2852)
- The Local Authorities (Functions and Responsibilities) (England) Regulations 2000 (S.I. 2000 No. 2853)
- The Social Security Commissioners (Procedure) (Amendment) Regulations 2000 (S.I. 2000 No. 2854)
- The Public Telecommunication System Designation(i-21 Ltd) Order 2000 (S.I. 2000 No. 2855)
- The Public Telecommunication System Designation (Pacific Gateway Exchange (UK) Limited) Order 2000 (S.I. 2000 No. 2856)
- The Public Telecommunication System Designation (Alpha Telecom (UK) Ltd) Order 2000 (S.I. 2000 No. 2857)
- The Public Telecommunication System Designation (Sonera UK Ltd) Order 2000 (S.I. 2000 No. 2858)
- The Public Telecommunication System Designation (M3COM (UK) Limited) Order 2000 (S.I. 2000 No. 2859)
- The Public Telecommunication System Designation (Formus Communications-UK Ltd) Order 2000 (S.I. 2000 No. 2860)
- The Public Telecommunication System Designation (Redstone Network Services Limited) Order 2000 (S.I. 2000 No. 2861)
- The Public Telecommunication System Designation (Louis Dreyfus Communications S.A.) Order 2000 (S.I. 2000 No. 2862)
- The Public Telecommunication System Designation (CommsTec Limited) Order 2000 (S.I. 2000 No. 2863)
- The Social Fund Winter Fuel Payment (Amendment) Regulations 2000 (S.I. 2000 No. 2864)
- The General Chiropractic Council (Functions of Legal Assessors) Rules Order 2000 (S.I. 2000 No. 2865)
- The General Chiropractic Council (Functions of Medical Assessors) Rules Order 2000 (S.I. 2000 No. 2866)
- The Town and Country Planning (Environmental Impact Assessment) (England and Wales) (Amendment) Regulations 2000 (S.I. 2000 No. 2867)
- The Charities (Accounts and Reports) Regulations 2000 (S.I. 2000 No. 2868)
- The National Health Service (Travelling Expenses and Remission of Charges) Amendment (No. 3) Regulations 2000 (S.I. 2000 No. 2870)
- The Road Traffic (Permitted Parking Area and Special Parking Area) (County of Bedfordshire) (Borough of Bedford) Order 2000 (S.I. 2000 No. 2871)
- The Education (Foundation Body) (England) Regulations 2000 (S.I. 2000 No. 2872)
- The Orders for the Delivery of Documents (Procedure) Regulations 2000 (S.I. 2000 No. 2875)
- The Welfare Reform and Pensions (Persons Abroad: Benefits for Widows and Widowers) (Consequential Amendments) Regulations 2000 (S.I. 2000 No. 2876)
- The Statutory Maternity Pay (General) (Modification and Amendment) Regulations 2000 (S.I. 2000 No. 2883)
- The Recreation Grounds (Revocation of Parish Council Byelaws) Order 2000 (S.I. 2000 No. 2884)
- The Northern Lincolnshire and Goole Hospitals National Health Service Trust (Establishment) Order 2000 (S.I. 2000 No. 2885)
- The Walsgrave Hospitals National Health Service Trust Change of Name and (Establishment) Amendment Order 2000 (S.I. 2000 No. 2886)
- The Highways Noise Payments and Movable Homes (England) Regulations 2000 (S.I. 2000 No. 2887)
- The Farm Waste Grant (Nitrate Vulnerable Zones) (England) Scheme 2000 (S.I. 2000 No. 2890)
- The Child Benefit (General) Amendment Regulations 2000 (S.I. 2000 No. 2891)
- The Dangerous Substances and Preparations (Safety) (Consolidation) and Chemicals (Hazard Information and Packaging for Supply) (Amendment) Regulations 2000 (S.I. 2000 No. 2897)
- The Prescription Only Medicines (Human Use) Amendment (No. 2) Order 2000 (S.I. 2000 No. 2899)
- The Animals and Animal Products (Import and Export) (England and Wales) (Amendment) (No. 2) Regulations 2000 (S.I. 2000 No. 2900)

== 2901–3000 ==
The Education (Restriction of Employment) (Wales) Regulations 2000 (S.I. 2000 No. 2906 (W. 186 ))

- Rheoliadau Addysg (Cyfyngu Cyflogaeth) (Cymru) 2000 (S.I. 2000 Rhif 2906 (Cy. 186 ))
- The Rural Development Grants (Agriculture and Forestry) Regulations 2000 (S.I. 2000 No. 2907)
- The Nottinghamshire Healthcare National Health Service Trust (Establishment) Order 2000 (S.I. 2000 No. 2908)
- The Sheffield Teaching Hospitals National Health Service Trust (Establishment) Order 2000 (S.I. 2000 No. 2909)
- The Social Security Amendment (Employment Zones) (No. 2) Regulations 2000 (S.I. 2000 No. 2910)
- The Farm Waste Grant (Nitrate Vulnerable Zones) (England) (No. 2) Scheme 2000 (S.I. 2000 No. 2911)
- The Education (Student Support) Regulations 2000 (Amendment) (No. 3) Regulations 2000 (S.I. 2000 No. 2912)
- The Broadcasting (Limit in relation to Provision of Digital Programme Services) Order 2000 (S.I. 2000 No. 2913)
- The Sharing of State Scheme Rights (Provision of Information and Valuation) (No. 2) Regulations 2000 (S.I. 2000 No. 2914)
- The General Chiropractic Council (Investigating Committee) Rules Order of Council 2000 (S.I. 2000 No. 2916)
- The Utilities Act 2000 (Commencement No. 2) Order 2000 (S.I. 2000 No. 2917 (C. 84)])
- The Court Funds (Amendment) Rules 2000 (S.I. 2000 No. 2918 (L.24)])
- The Terrorism Act 2000 (Commencement No. 2) Order 2000 (S.I. 2000 No. 2944 (C. 85)])
- The Education (Fees and Awards) (Amendment No. 2) (England) Regulations 2000 (S.I. 2000 No. 2945)
- The Local Government Act 2000 (Commencement) (Wales) Order 2000 (S.I. 2000 No. 2948 (W. 189 ) (C. 86 ))
- Gorchymyn Deddf Llywodraeth Leol 2000 (Cychwyn) (Cymru) 2000 (S.I. 2000 Rhif 2948 (Cy. 189 ) (C. 86 ))
- The Royal Parks and Other Open Spaces (Park Trading) Regulations 2000 (S.I. 2000 No. 2949)
- The Child Support, Pensions and Social Security Act 2000 (Commencement No.2) Order 2000 (S.I. 2000 No. 2950 (C. 87)])
- The Banking Consolidation Directive (Consequential Amendments) Regulations 2000 (S.I. 2000 No. 2952)
- The Rail Vehicle Accessibility (South West Trains Class 170/3 Vehicles) Exemption Order 2000 (S.I. 2000 No. 2953)
- The Value Added Tax (Reduced Rate) Order 2000 (S.I. 2000 No. 2954)
- The Museums and Galleries Act 1992 (Amendment) Order 2000 (S.I. 2000 No. 2955)
- The Utilities Act 2000 (Supply of Information) Regulations 2000 (S.I. 2000 No. 2956)
- The Postal Services Act 2000 (Commencement No. 1 and Transitional Provisions) Order 2000 (S.I. 2000 No. 2957 (C. 88)])
- The Welfare Reform and Pensions Act 1999 (Commencement No. 9, and Transitional and Savings Provisions) Order 2000 (S.I. 2000 No. 2958 (C.89)])
- The Home Energy Efficiency Schemes (Wales) Regulations 2000 (S.I. 2000 No. 2959 (W. 190 ))
- Rheoliadau'r Cynlluniau Effeithlonrwydd Ynni Cartref (Cymru) 2000 (S.I. 2000 Rhif 2959 (Cy. 190 ))
- The Community Drivers' Hours (Tankers) (Temporary Exception) Regulations 2000 (S.I. 2000 No. 2960)
- The National Clinical Assessment Authority (Establishment and Constitution) Order 2000 (S.I. 2000 No. 2961)
- The National Clinical Assessment Authority Regulations 2000 (S.I. 2000 No. 2962)
- The Potatoes Originating in Egypt (Amendment) (No. 2) (England) Regulations 2000 (S.I. 2000 No. 2963)
- The Utilities Act 2000 (Commencement No. 3 and Transitional Provisions) Order 2000 (S.I. 2000 No. 2974 (C. 90)])
- The Pension Sharing (Contracting-out) (Consequential Amendments) Regulations 2000 (S.I. 2000 No. 2975)
- The Cattle (Identification of Older Animals)Regulations 2000 (S.I. 2000 No. 2976)
- The Dairy Produce Quotas (Amendment) (England) (No. 2) Regulations 2000 (S.I. 2000 No. 2977)
- The Tax Credits Schemes (Miscellaneous Amendments No. 4) Regulations 2000 (S.I. 2000 No. 2978)
- The Tax Credits Schemes (Miscellaneous Amendments No. 4) (Northern Ireland) Regulations 2000 (S.I. 2000 No. 2979)
- The Submarine Pipelines (Designated Owners) (Revocation) Order 2000 (S.I. 2000 No. 2980)
- The Yugoslavia (Prohibition of Flights) (No. 2) (Revocation) Regulations 2000 (S.I. 2000 No. 2981)
- The Isle of Wight Primary Care Trust (Establishment) Order 2000 (S.I. 2000 No. 2982)
- The Judicial Pensions (Implementation of Pension Credits) Regulations 2000 (S.I. 2000 No. 2983)
- The Judicial Pensions (Specification of Alternative Scheme) Regulations 2000 (S.I. 2000 No. 2984)
- The Judicial Pensions Act 1981 (Amendment) Regulations 2000 (S.I. 2000 No. 2985)
- The Judicial Pensions and Retirement Act 1993 (Amendment) Regulations 2000 (S.I. 2000 No. 2986)
- The Crown Court (Amendment) (No. 2) Rules 2000 (S.I. 2000 No. 2987 (L. 25)])
- The Collective Conditional Fee Agreements Regulations 2000 (S.I. 2000 No. 2988)
- The Disability Discrimination Act 1995 (Commencement No. 8) Order 2000 (S.I. 2000 No. 2989 (C.91)])
- The Disability Discrimination Act 1995 (Taxis) (Carrying of Guide Dogs etc.) (England and Wales) Regulations 2000 (S.I. 2000 No. 2990)
- The Health Act 1999 (Commencement No.3) (Wales) Order 2000 (S.I. 2000 No. 2991 (W. 191)(C. 92))
- Gorchymyn Deddf Iechyd 1999(Cychwyn Rhif 3) (Cymru) 2000 (S.I. 2000 Rhif 2991 (Cy. 191)(C. 92))
- The Care Standards Act 2000 (Commencement No.1) (Wales) Order 2000 (S.I. 2000 No. 2992 (W. 192 ) (C. 93 ))
- Gorchymyn Deddf Safonau Gofal 2000 (Cychwyn Rhif 1) (Cymru) 2000 (S.I. 2000 Rhif 2992 (Cy. 192 ) (C. 93 ))
- The National Health Service Bodies and Local Authorities Partnership Arrangements (Wales) Regulations 2000 (S.I. 2000 No. 2993 (W. 193 ))
- Rheoliadau Trefniadau Partneriaeth Cyrff Gwasanaeth Iechyd Gwladol ac Awdurdodau Lleol (Cymru) 2000 (S.I. 2000 Rhif 2993 (Cy. 193 ))
- The Child Support, Pensions and Social Security Act 2000 (Commencement No. 3) Order 2000 (S.I. 2000 No. 2994 (C.94)])
- The Stamp Duty and Stamp Duty Reserve Tax (Investment Exchanges and Clearing Houses) (Jiway Limited) Regulations 2000 (S.I. 2000 No. 2995)
- The Income Tax (Indexation) (No. 2) Order 2000 (S.I. 2000 No. 2996)
- The Social Fund Winter Fuel Payment (Temporary Increase) Regulations 2000 (S.I. 2000 No. 2997)
- The Telecommunications (Licence Modifications) (Amendment No. 2) Regulations 2000 (S.I. 2000 No. 2998)

== 3001–3100 ==
- The Local Government Pension Scheme(Pension Sharing on Divorce) Regulations 2000 (S.I. 2000 No. 3025)
- The Education (Exclusion from School) (Prescribed Periods) (Amendment) (Wales) Regulations 2000 (S.I. 2000 No. 3026 (W. 194))
  - Rheoliadau Addysg (Gwahardd o'r Ysgol) (Cyfnodau Rhagnodedig) (Diwygio) (Cymru) 2000 (S.I. 2000 Rhif 3026 (Cy. 194))
- The School Government (Terms of Reference)(Wales) Regulations 2000 (S.I. 2000 No. 3027 (W. 195))
  - Rheoliadau Llywodraethu Ysgolion (Cylch Gwaith) (Cymru) 2000 (S.I. 2000 Rhif 3027 (Cy. 195))
- The Teachers' Pensions (Sharing of Pensions on Divorce or Annulment) Regulations 2000 (S.I. 2000 No. 3028)
- The National Health Service (Optical Charges and Payments) Amendment (No. 2) Regulations 2000 (S.I. 2000 No. 3029)
- Social Security (Recovery of Benefits) (Miscellaneous Amendments) Regulations 2000 (S.I. 2000 No. 3030)
- The Medicines (Products for Human Use—Fees) Amendment Regulations 2000 (S.I. 2000 No. 3031)
- The Sheriffs' Pensions (Scotland) Act 1961 (Amendment) Regulations 2000 (S.I. 2000 No. 3032 (S. 8)])
- The Environment Act 1995 (Commencement No. 18) (England and Wales) Order 2000 (S.I. 2000 No. 3033 (C. 95)])
- The Medical Act 1983 (Approved Medical Practices and Conditions of Residence) and National Health Service (General Medical Services) (Amendment) Regulations 2000 (S.I. 2000 No. 3040)
- The Medical Act 1983 (Provisional Registration) Regulations 2000 (S.I. 2000 No. 3041)
- The Energy Crops Regulations 2000 (S.I. 2000 No. 3042)
- The Rural Enterprise Regulations 2000 (S.I. 2000 No. 3043)
- The England Rural Development Programme (Enforcement) Regulations 2000 (S.I. 2000 No. 3044)
- The Vocational Training Grants (Agriculture and Forestry) Regulations 2000 (S.I. 2000 No. 3045)
- The Agricultural Processing and Marketing Grants Regulations 2000 (S.I. 2000 No. 3046)
- The Beef Labelling (Enforcement) (England) Regulations 2000 (S.I. 2000 No. 3047)
- The Countryside Stewardship Regulations 2000 (S.I. 2000 No. 3048)
- The Environmentally Sensitive Areas (Stage I) Designation Order 2000 (S.I. 2000 No. 3049)
- The Environmentally Sensitive Areas (Stage II) Designation Order 2000 (S.I. 2000 No. 3050)
- The Environmentally Sensitive Areas (Stage III) Designation Order 2000 (S.I. 2000 No. 3051)
- The Environmentally Sensitive Areas (Stage IV) Designation Order 2000 (S.I. 2000 No. 3052)
- The Asylum Support (Amendment) Regulations 2000 (S.I. 2000 No. 3053)
- The Commission Areas (Avon and Somerset) Order 2000 (S.I. 2000 No. 3054)
- The Local Government and Housing Act 1989 (Electronic Communications) (England) Order 2000 (S.I. 2000 No. 3056)
- The European Communities (Designation) (No. 4) Order 2000 (S.I. 2000 No. 3057)
- The Education (Inspectors of Schools in England) Order 2000 (S.I. 2000 No. 3058)
- The Aviation Security and Piracy (Overseas Territories) Order 2000 (S.I. 2000 No. 3059)
- The Anguilla, Montserrat and Virgin Islands (Supreme Court) Order 2000 (S.I. 2000 No. 3060)
- The Carriage by Air (Parties to Protocol No. 4 of Montreal, 1975) Order 2000 (S.I. 2000 No. 3061)
- The Continental Shelf (Designation of Areas) (Consolidation) Order 2000 (S.I. 2000 No. 3062)
- The Social Security (Contributions) (Japan) Order 2000 (S.I. 2000 No. 3063)
- The Crown Office (Forms and Proclamations Rules) (Amendment) Order 2000 (S.I. 2000 No. 3064)
- The Youth Justice and Criminal Evidence Act 1999 (Commencement No. 5) Order 2000 (S.I. 2000 No. 3075 (C. 96)])
- The Designation of Schools Having a Religious Character (England) Order 2000 (S.I. 2000 No. 3080)
- The Occupational Pensions (Revaluation) Order 2000 (S.I. 2000 No. 3085)
- The Highways Noise Payments and Movable Homes (England) (Amendment) Regulations 2000 (S.I. 2000 No. 3086)
- The Education (Grants for Disabled Postgraduate Students) Regulations 2000 (Amendment) Regulations 2000 (S.I. 2000 No. 3087)
- The Pension Sharing (Excepted Schemes) Order 2000 (S.I. 2000 No. 3088)
- The Town and Country Planning (Costs of Inquiries etc.) (Standard Daily Amount) (England) Regulations 2000 (S.I. 2000 No. 3089)
- The Commission Areas (Dyfed Powys) Order 2000 (S.I. 2000 No. 3096)
- The Batteries and Accumulators (Containing Dangerous Substances) (Amendment) Regulations 2000 (S.I. 2000 No. 3097)
- Charities (The Rochester Bridge Trust) Order 2000 (SI 2000/3098)
- The Immigration and Asylum Act 1999 (Commencement No. 8 and Transitional Provisions) Order 2000 (S.I. 2000 No. 3099 (C. 97))

== 3101–3200 ==
- The Education (School Teachers' Pay and Conditions)(No. 4) Order 2000 (S.I. 2000 No. 3106)
- The Land Registration (Conduct of Business) (Amendment) Regulations 2000 (S.I. 2000 No. 3108)
- The Personal Equity Plan (Amendment)Regulations 2000 (S.I. 2000 No. 3109)
- The Savings Certificates (Amendment) Regulations 2000 (S.I. 2000 No. 3110)
- The Policyholders Protection Act 1997 (Commencement No. 2) Order 2000 (S.I. 2000 No. 3111 (C. 98)])
- The Individual Savings Account (Amendment No. 3) Regulations 2000 (S.I. 2000 No. 3112)
- The Road Transport (Passenger Vehicles Cabotage) (Amendment) Regulations 2000 (S.I. 2000 No. 3114)
- The Community Drivers' Hours (Tankers) (Temporary Exception) (Revocation) Regulations 2000 (S.I. 2000 No. 3115)
- The National Health Service Trusts (Trust Funds: Appointment of Trustees) Amendment Order 2000 (S.I. 2000 No. 3116)
- The National Health Service (General Dental Services) Amendment (Wales) Regulations 2000 (S.I. 2000 No. 3118 (W. 197 ))
- Rheoliadau'r Gwasanaeth Iechyd Gwladol (Gwasanaethau Deintyddol Cyffredinol) Diwygio (Cymru) 2000 (S.I. 2000 Rhif 3118 (Cy. 197 ))
- The National Health Service (Optical Charges and Payments) Amendment (No.2) (Wales) Regulations 2000 (S.I. 2000 No. 3119 (W. 198 ))
- Rheoliadau'r Gwasanaeth Iechyd Gwladol (Ffioedd a Thaliadau Optegol) Diwygio (Rhif 2) (Cymru) 2000 (S.I. 2000 Rhif 3119 (Cy. 198 ))
- The Social Security (Incapacity Benefit) Miscellaneous Amendments Regulations 2000 (S.I. 2000 No. 3120)
- The Children's Commissioner for Wales (Appointment) Regulations 2000 (S.I. 2000 No. 3121 (W. 199 ))
- Rheoliadau Comisiynydd Plant Cymru (Penodi) 2000 (S.I. 2000 Rhif 3121 (Cy. 199 ))
- The Teachers (Compulsory Registration) (Wales) Regulations 2000 (S.I. 2000 No. 3122 (W. 200 ))
- Rheoliadau Athrawon (Cofrestru Gorfodol) (Cymru) 2000 (S.I. 2000 Rhif 3122 (Cy. 200 ))
- The Dairy Produce Quotas (Amendment) (Wales) (No. 2) Regulations 2000 (S.I. 2000 No. 3123 (W. 201 ))
- Rheoliadau Cwotâu Cynhyrchion Llaeth (Diwygio) (Cymru) (Rhif 2) 2000 (S.I. 2000 Rhif 3123 (Cy. 201 ))
- The Doncaster Royal Infirmary and Montagu Hospital and the Bassetlaw Hospital and Community Services National Health Service Trusts (Dissolution) Order 2000 (S.I. 2000 No. 3124)
- The Doncaster and Bassetlaw Hospitals National Health Service Trust (Establishment) Order 2000 (S.I. 2000 No. 3125)
- The Slaughter Premium Regulations 2000 (S.I. 2000 No. 3126)
- The Common Agricultural Policy Support Schemes (Modulation) Regulations 2000 (S.I. 2000 No. 3127)
- The Animals and Animal Products (Import and Export) (England and Wales) (Amendment) (No. 3) Regulations 2000 (S.I. 2000 No. 3128)
- The Plymouth City Council Act 1987 (Modification) Order 2000 (S.I. 2000 No. 3132)
- The Tax Credits (New Deal Pilot Consequential Amendments) (Northern Ireland) Regulations 2000 (S.I. 2000 No. 3133)
- The Social Security (New Deal Pilot) Regulations 2000 (S.I. 2000 No. 3134)
- The Private Hire Vehicles (London) Act 1998 (Commencement No. 1) Order 2000 (S.I. 2000 No. 3144 (C. 99)])
- The Greater London Authority Act 1999 (Commencement No. 8 and Consequential Provisions) Order 2000 (S.I. 2000 No. 3145 (C. 100)])
- The Private Hire Vehicles (London) (Operators' Licences) Regulations 2000 (S.I. 2000 No. 3146)
- The Firearms (Variation of Fees) Order 2000 (S.I. 2000 No. 3148)
- The Smoke Control Areas (Authorised Fuels) (Amendment) (Wales) Regulations 2000 (S.I. 2000 No. 3156 (W. 205 ))
- Rheoliadau Ardaloedd Rheoli Mwg (Tanwyddau Awdurdodedig) (Diwygio) (Cymru) 2000 (S.I. 2000 Rhif 3156 (Cy. 205 ))
- The Motor Vehicles (Driving Licences) (Amendment)(No. 2) Regulations 2000 (S.I. 2000 No. 3157)
- The Controlled Foreign Companies (Designer Rate Tax Provisions) Regulations 2000 (S.I. 2000 No. 3158)
- The North East London Education Association (Dissolution) Order 2000 (S.I. 2000 No. 3159)
- The Education (Grants) (Purcell School) Regulations 2000 (S.I. 2000 No. 3160)
- The Education (Inner London Education Authority) (Property Transfer) (Modification) Order 2000 (S.I. 2000 No. 3161)
- The Plastic Materials and Articles in Contact with Food (Amendment) (England) Regulations 2000 (S.I. 2000 No. 3162)
- The Insurance Brokers Registration Council (Registration and Enrolment) (Amendment) Rules Approval Order 2000 (S.I. 2000 No. 3163)
- The Reporting of Suspicious Marriages and Registration of Marriages (Miscellaneous Amendments) Regulations 2000 (S.I. 2000 No. 3164)
- The Registration of Births, Deaths and Marriages (Fees) (Amendment) Order 2000 (S.I. 2000 No. 3165)
- The Child Support, Pensions and Social Security Act 2000 (Commencement No. 4) Order 2000 (S.I. 2000 No. 3166 (C. 101)])
- The Parsonages Measure Rules 2000 (S.I. 2000 No. 3171)
- The Child Support (Variations) (Modification of Statutory Provisions) Regulations 2000 (S.I. 2000 No. 3173)
- The Child Support (Temporary Compensation Payment Scheme) Regulations 2000 (S.I. 2000 No. 3174)
- The Harwich Haven Harbour Revision Order 2000 (S.I. 2000 No. 3175)
- The Social Security (Child Maintenance Premium and Miscellaneous Amendments) Regulations 2000 (S.I. 2000 No. 3176)
- The Child Support (Voluntary Payments) Regulations 2000 (S.I. 2000 No. 3177)
- The Terrorism Act 2000 (Video recording of interviews)Order 2000 (S.I. 2000 No. 3179)
- The War Pensions Committees Regulations 2000 (S.I. 2000 No. 3180)
- The Social Security (Disability Living Allowance) (Amendment) Regulations 2000 (S.I. 2000 No. 3181)
- The Professions Supplementary to Medicine (Registration) (Amendment) Rules Order of Council 2000 (S.I. 2000 No. 3182)
- The Registered Parties (Non-constituent and Non-affiliated Organisations) Order 2000 (S.I. 2000 No. 3183)
- The Water Supply (Water Quality) Regulations 2000 (S.I. 2000 No. 3184)
- The Child Support (Decisions and Appeals) (Amendment) Regulations 2000 (S.I. 2000 No. 3185)
- The Child Support (Transitional Provisions) Regulations 2000 (S.I. 2000 No. 3186)
- The Rail Vehicle Accessibility (Gatwick Express Class 460 Vehicles) Exemption (Amendment No. 2) Order 2000 (S.I. 2000 No. 3187)
- The Social Security (Disclosure of State Pension Information) Regulations 2000 (S.I. 2000 No. 3188)
- The National Health Service (Charges for Drugs and Appliances) Amendment (No. 2) Regulations 2000 (S.I. 2000 No. 3189)
- The General Medical Council (Registration (Fees) (Amendment) No. 2 Regulations) Order of Council 2000 (S.I. 2000 No. 3194)
- The Diseases of Animals (Approved Disinfectants) (Amendment) (England) Order 2000 (S.I. 2000 No. 3195)
- The International Carriage of Perishable Foodstuffs (Amendment) Regulations 2000 (S.I. 2000 No. 3196)
- The Road Vehicles (Construction and Use) (Amendment) (No. 3) Regulations 2000 (S.I. 2000 No. 3197)
- The Occupational Pension Schemes (Republic of Ireland Schemes Exemption) Regulations 2000 (S.I. 2000 No. 3198)
- The Transport and Works (Assessment of Environmental Effects) Regulations 2000 (S.I. 2000 No. 3199)

== 3201–3300 ==
- The Gas Act 1986 (Exemptions) (No. 4) (Amendment) Order 2000 (S.I. 2000 No. 3206)
- The Goods Vehicles (Authorisation of International Journeys) (Fees) Regulations 2000 (S.I. 2000 No. 3207)
- The Non-Domestic Rating Contributions (England) (Amendment) Regulations 2000 (S.I. 2000 No. 3208)
- The Education (New Procedures for Property Transfers) Regulations 2000 (S.I. 2000 No. 3209)
- The Civil Aviation (Route Charges for Navigation Services) (Second Amendment) Regulations 2000 (S.I. 2000 No. 3212)
- The Beer and Cider and Perry (Amendment) Regulations 2000 (S.I. 2000 No. 3213)
- The General Chiropractic Council (Health Appeal Tribunal) Rules Order 2000 (S.I. 2000 No. 3214)
- The Rail Vehicle Accessibility (Amendment) Regulations 2000 (S.I. 2000 No. 3215)
- The Merchant Shipping (Carriage of Packaged Irradiated Nuclear Fuel etc.) (INF Code) Regulations 2000 (S.I. 2000 No. 3216)
- The Rail Vehicle Accessibility (South West Trains Class 170/3 Vehicles) Exemption (Amendment) Order 2000 (S.I. 2000 No. 3217)
- The Rail Vehicle Accessibility (The Chiltern Railway Company Limited Class 168/1 Vehicles) Exemption (No. 2) (Amendment) Order 2000 (S.I. 2000 No. 3218)
- The Walford College, Shropshire (Dissolution) Order 2000 (S.I. 2000 No. 3219)
- The Social Fund (Recovery by Deductions from Benefits)Amendment Regulations 2000 (S.I. 2000 No. 3223)
- The Road Vehicles (Authorised Weight) (Amendment) Regulations 2000 (S.I. 2000 No. 3224)
- The Land Registration (No. 3) Rules 2000 (S.I. 2000 No. 3225)
- The Transport Tribunal Rules 2000 (S.I. 2000 No. 3226)
- The Statistics of Trade (Customs and Excise) (Amendment) Regulations 2000 (S.I. 2000 No. 3227)
- The Corporation Tax (Simplified Arrangements for Group Relief) (Amendment) Regulations 2000 (S.I. 2000 No. 3228)
- The Transport Act 2000 (Commencement No. 1 and Transitional Provisions) Order 2000 (S.I. 2000 No. 3229 (C. 102)])
- The Learning and Skills Act 2000 (Commencement No. 2) (Wales) Order 2000 (S.I. 2000 No. 3230 (W. 213 ) (C. 103 ))
- Gorchymyn Deddf Dysgu a Medrau 2000 (Cychwyn Rhif 2) (Cymru) 2000 (S.I. 2000 Rhif 3230 (Cy. 213 ) (C. 103 ))
- The Prescription Only Medicines (Human Use) Amendment (No. 3) Order 2000 (S.I. 2000 No. 3231)
- The Reporting of Suspicious Marriages (Scotland) Regulations 2000 (S.I. 2000 No. 3232 (S. 9)])
- The Reporting of Suspicious Marriages (Northern Ireland) Regulations 2000 (S.I. 2000 No. 3233)
- The Medicines (Pharmacies) (Applications for Registration and Fees) Amendment Regulations 2000 (S.I. 2000 No. 3235)
- The Non-automatic Weighing Instruments Regulations 2000 (S.I. 2000 No. 3236)
- The Local Authorities (Capital Finance and Accounts) (England) Regulations 2000 (S.I. 2000 No. 3237)
- The European Communities (Designation) (No. 5) Order 2000 (S.I. 2000 No. 3238)
- The Education (Chief Inspector of Schools in England) Order 2000 (S.I. 2000 No. 3239)
- The Caribbean Territories (Control of Gold, Securities, Payments and Credits: Kuwait and Republic of Iraq) Revocation Order 2000 (S.I. 2000 No. 3240)
- The Iraq (United Nations Sanctions) Order 2000 (S.I. 2000 No. 3241)
- The Iraq (United Nations Sanctions) (Overseas Territories) Order 2000 (S.I. 2000 No. 3242)
- The United Nations (International Tribunals) (Former Yugoslavia and Rwanda) (Amendment) (No. 2) Order 2000 (S.I. 2000 No. 3243)
- The Iraq (United Nations Sanctions) (Channel Islands) Order 2000 (S.I. 2000 No. 3244)
- The Iraq (United Nations Sanctions) (Isle of Man) Order 2000 (S.I. 2000 No. 3245)
- The Air Navigation (Jersey) (Amendment) Order 2000 (S.I. 2000 No. 3246)
- The Double Taxation Relief (Taxes on Income) (Norway) Order 2000 (S.I. 2000 No. 3247)
- The Double Taxation Relief (Shipping Transport) (Hong Kong) Order 2000 (S.I. 2000 No. 3248)
- The Census (Amendment) Order 2000 (S.I. 2000 No. 3249)
- The Scotland Act 1998 (Agency Arrangements) (Specification) (No. 2) Order 2000 (S.I. 2000 No. 3250)
- The Scotland Act 1998 (Cross-Border Public Authorities) (Adaptation of Functions etc.) (No. 2) Order 2000 (S.I. 2000 No. 3251)
- The Scotland Act 1998 (Modifications of Schedule 5) Order 2000 (S.I. 2000 No. 3252)
- The Scotland Act 1998 (Transfer of Functions to the Scottish Ministers etc.) (No. 2) Order 2000 (S.I. 2000 No. 3253)
- The Northern Ireland Act 1998 (Modification) (No. 2) Order 2000 (S.I. 2000 No. 3254)
- The Social Security (Australia) Order 2000 (S.I. 2000 No. 3255)
- The Severn Bridges Tolls Order 2000 (S.I. 2000 No. 3256)
- The European Communities (Definition of Treaties) (Agreement between the European Community and its Member States and the Swiss Confederation on the Free Movement of Persons) Order 2000 (S.I. 2000 No. 3269)
- The Derelict Land Clearance Area (Reading) Order 2000 (S.I. 2000 No. 3270)
- The Control of Gold, Securities, Payments and Credits(Republic of Iraq) (Revocation) Directions 2000 (S.I. 2000 No. 3271)
- The Local Authorities (Executive Arrangements) (Access to Information) (England) Regulations 2000 (S.I. 2000 No. 3272)
- The Post Office Users' National Council (Appointed Day) Order 2000 (S.I. 2000 No. 3273 (C. 116)])
- The Vehicle Excise Duty (Reduced Pollution) (Amendment) Regulations 2000 (S.I. 2000 No. 3274)
- The Motor Vehicles (Type Approval of Reduced Pollution Adaptations) (Amendment) Regulations 2000 (S.I. 2000 No. 3275)
- The Civil Aviation (Joint Financing) (Third Amendment) Regulations 2000 (S.I. 2000 No. 3276)
- The Enforcement of Warrants (Disclosure of Information) Order 2000 (S.I. 2000 No. 3277)
- The Magistrates' Courts Warrants (Specification of Provisions) Order 2000 (S.I. 2000 No. 3278)
- The Approval of Enforcement Agencies Regulations 2000 (S.I. 2000 No. 3279)
- The Access to Justice Act 1999 (Commencement No. 5 and Transitional Provisions) Order 2000 (S.I. 2000 No. 3280 (C. 104)])
- The Veterinary Surgeons and Veterinary Practitioners (Registration) (Amendment) RegulationsOrder of Council 2000 (S.I. 2000 No. 3282)
- The Crime and Disorder Act 1998 (Commencement No. 8) Order 2000 (S.I. 2000 No. 3283 (C.107)])
- The Prosecution of Offences (Custody Time Limits) (Amendment) Regulations 2000 (S.I. 2000 No. 3284)
- The District of Bassetlaw (Electoral Changes) Order 2000 (S.I. 2000 No. 3285)
- The General Chiropractic Council (Professional Conduct Committee) Rules Order of Council 2000 (S.I. 2000 No. 3290)
- The General Chiropractic Council (Health Committee) Rules Order of Council 2000 (S.I. 2000 No. 3291)
- The Common Agricultural Policy Support Schemes (Modulation) (Wales) Regulations 2000 (S.I. 2000 No. 3294 (W. 216 ))
- Rheoliadau Cynlluniau Cymorth y Polisi Amaethyddol Cyffredin (Modwleiddio) (Cymru) 2000 (S.I. 2000 Rhif 3294 (Cy. 216 ))
- The District of Ashfield (Electoral Changes) Order 2000 (S.I. 2000 No. 3295)
- The Borough of Broxtowe (Electoral Changes) Order 2000 (S.I. 2000 No. 3296)
- The Borough of Gedling (Electoral Changes) Order 2000 (S.I. 2000 No. 3297)
- The District of Mansfield (Electoral Changes) Order 2000 (S.I. 2000 No. 3298)
- The District of Newark and Sherwood (Electoral Changes) Order 2000 (S.I. 2000 No. 3299)
- The City of Nottingham (Electoral Changes) Order 2000 (S.I. 2000 No. 3300)

== 3301–3400 ==
- The Borough of Rushcliffe (Electoral Changes) Order 2000 (S.I. 2000 No. 3301)
- The Criminal Justice and Court Services Act 2000 (Commencement No. 1) Order 2000 (S.I. 2000 No. 3302 (C.105)])
- The Sexual Offences (Amendment) Act 2000 (Commencement No. 1) Order 2000 (S.I. 2000 No. 3303 (C.106)])
- The Dual-Use Items (Export Control) (Amendment) Regulations 2000 (S.I. 2000 No. 3304)
- The Crime and Disorder Act 1998 (Service of Prosecution Evidence) Regulations 2000 (S.I. 2000 No. 3305)
- The Street Works (Sharing of Costs of Works) (England) Regulations 2000 (S.I. 2000 No. 3314)
- The Exchange Gains and Losses (Miscellaneous Modifications) Regulations 2000 (S.I. 2000 No. 3315)
- The Limited Liability Partnerships Act 2000 (Commencement) Order 2000 (S.I. 2000 No. 3316 (C.108)])
- The Road Traffic (Permitted Parking Area and Special Parking Area) (Metropolitan Borough of Trafford) Order 2000 (S.I. 2000 No. 3317)
- The Public Service Vehicles Accessibility (Amendment) Regulations 2000 (S.I. 2000 No. 3318)
- The Public Lending Right Scheme 1982 (Commencement of Variations) (No. 2) Order 2000 (S.I. 2000 No. 3319)
- The Sport and Arts Joint Scheme (Authorisation) Order 2000 (S.I. 2000 No. 3320)
- The Coffee Extracts and Chicory Extracts (England) Regulations 2000 (S.I. 2000 No. 3323)
- The Open-Ended Investment Companies (Investment Companies with Variable Capital) (Fees) (Amendment) Regulations 2000 (S.I. 2000 No. 3324)
- The Companies (Fees) (Amendment) Regulations 2000 (S.I. 2000 No. 3325)
- The East Manchester Education Action Zone (Variation) Order 2000 (S.I. 2000 No. 3326)
- The Education (Recognised Bodies) (England) Order 2000 (S.I. 2000 No. 3327)
- The Withernsea and Southern Holderness Rural Achievement Education Action Zone (Amendment) Order 2000 (S.I. 2000 No. 3328)
- The Education Standards Fund (England) (Amendment No. 2) Regulations 2000 (S.I. 2000 No. 3329)
- The Double Taxation Relief (Taxes on Income) (Dividends, etc.) (Revocations) Regulations 2000 (S.I. 2000 No. 3330)
- The Football Spectators (Designation of Football Matches in England and Wales) Order 2000 (S.I. 2000 No. 3331)
- The Education (Listed Bodies) (England) Order 2000 (S.I. 2000 No. 3332)
- The Local Government Act 2000 (Commencement No. 5) Order 2000 (S.I. 2000 No. 3335 (C. 109)])
- The Jobseeker's Allowance (Joint Claims: Consequential Amendments) Regulations 2000 (S.I. 2000 No. 3336)
- The Newham Education Action Zone (Variation) Order 2000 (S.I. 2000 No. 3337)
- The Immigration (Designation of Travel Bans) (Amendment) Order 2000 (S.I. 2000 No. 3338)
- The Cattle (Identification of Older Animals) (Wales) Regulations 12000 (S.I. 2000 No. 3339 (W. 217 ))
- Rheoliadau Gwartheg (Adnabod Anifeiliaid Hŷn) (Cymru) 2000 (S.I. 2000 Rhif 3339 (Cy. 217 ))
- The Mink Keeping (Wales) Order 2000 (S.I. 2000 No. 3340 (W. 218))
- Gorchymyn Cadw Mincod (Cymru) 2000 (S.I. 2000 Rhif 3340 (Cy. 218))
- The Food Safety (General Food Hygiene) (Butchers' Shops) (Amendment) (Wales) Regulations 2000 (S.I. 2000 No. 3341 (W. 219 ))
- Rheoliadau Diogelwch Bwyd (Hylendid Bwyd yn Gyffredinol) (Siopau Cigyddion) (Diwygio) (Cymru) 2000 (S.I. 2000 Rhif 3341 (Cy. 219 ))
- The Local Probation Boards (Appointment) Regulations 2000 (S.I. 2000 No. 3342)
- The Utilities Act 2000 (Commencement No. 4 and Transitional Provisions) Order 2000 (S.I. 2000 No. 3343 (C. 110)])
- The Public Telecommunication System Designation (TyCom Networks (UK) Limited) Order 2000 (S.I. 2000 No. 3344)
- The Public Telecommunication System Designation (FPL Telecom Limited) Order 2000 (S.I. 2000 No. 3345)
- The Public Telecommunication System Designation (Atlas Communications (UK) Ltd) Order 2000 (S.I. 2000 No. 3346)
- The Public Telecommunication System Designation (Cable & Wireless HKT Pacific (UK) Ltd) Order 2000 (S.I. 2000 No. 3347)
- The Public Telecommunication System Designation (Central North Sea Fibre Telecommunications Company Limited) Order 2000 (S.I. 2000 No. 3348)
- The Government Resources and Accounts Act 2000 (Commencement No. 1 and Transitional Provision) Order 2000 (S.I. 2000 No. 3349 (C.111)])
- The Finance Act 2000, Schedule 6 Part V, (Appointed Day) Order 2000 (S.I. 2000 No. 3350 (C.113)])
- The Census (Amendment) Regulations 2000 (S.I. 2000 No. 3351)
- The Welfare of Animals (Slaughter or Killing) (Amendment) (England) Regulations 2000 (S.I. 2000 No. 3352)
- The Consular Fees Act 1980 (Fees) Order 2000 (S.I. 2000 No. 3353)
- The Child Support, Pensions and Social Security Act 2000 (Commencement No. 5) Order 2000 (S.I. 2000 No. 3354 (C.112)])
- The Millennium Commission (Substitution of a Later Date) Order 2000 (S.I. 2000 No. 3355)
- The Apportionment of Money in the National Lottery Distribution Fund Order 2000 (S.I. 2000 No. 3356)
- The Whole of Government Accounts (Designation of Bodies) Order 2000 (S.I. 2000 No. 3357)
- The Environmental Protection (Disposal of Polychlorinated Biphenyls and other Dangerous Substances) (England and Wales) (Amendment) Regulations 2000 (S.I. 2000 No. 3359)
- The Indictments (Procedure) (Amendment) Rules 2000 (S.I. 2000 No. 3360 (L. 26)])
- The Magistrates' Courts (Amendment) Rules 2000 (S.I. 2000 No. 3361 (L. 27)])
- The Crown Court (Amendment) (No. 3) Rules 2000 (S.I. 2000 No. 3362 (L. 28)])
- The Borough of Rugby (Electoral Changes) (No. 2) Order 2000 (S.I. 2000 No. 3363)
- The District of South Shropshire (Electoral Changes) (Amendment) Order 2000 (S.I. 2000 No. 3364)
- The Borough of Taunton Deane (Electoral Changes) (Amendment) Order 2000 (S.I. 2000 No. 3365)
- The Borough of Waverley (Electoral Changes) (Amendment) Order 2000 (S.I. 2000 No. 3366)
- The Education (School Teacher Appraisal) (Amendment) (England) Regulations 2000 (S.I. 2000 No. 3369)
- Education (Information About Individual Pupils) (England) Regulations 2000 (S.I. 2000 No. 3370)
- The Young Offender Institution Rules 2000 (S.I. 2000 No. 3371)
- The Deregulation (Sunday Dancing) Order 2000 (S.I. 2000 No. 3372)
- The Companies Act 1985 (Electronic Communications) Order 2000 (S.I. 2000 No. 3373)
- The Children and Family Court Advisory and Support Service (Membership, Committee and Procedure) Regulations 2000 (S.I. 2000 No. 3374)
- The Producer Responsibility Obligations (Packaging Waste) (Amendment) (England and Wales) Regulations 2000 (S.I. 2000 No. 3375)
- The Transport Act 2000 (Commencement No. 2) Order 2000 (S.I. 2000 No. 3376 (C.114)])
- The Specified Risk Material (Amendment) (England) (No. 3) Order 2000 (S.I. 2000 No. 3377)
- The Fresh Meat (Beef Controls) (No. 2) (Amendment) (England) Regulations 2000 (S.I. 2000 No. 3378)
- The Greater London Authority Act 1999 (Commencement No. 9) Order 2000 (S.I. 2000 No. 3379 (C. 115)])
- The Specified Risk Material (Amendment) (England) (No. 2) Regulations 2000 (S.I. 2000 No. 3381)
- The Non-Domestic Rating Contributions (Wales) (Amendment) Regulations 2000 (S.I. 2000 No. 3382 (W. 220 ))
- Rheoliadau Cyfraniadau Ardrethu Annomestig (Cymru) (Diwygio) 2000 (S.I. 2000 Rhif 3382 (Cy. 220 ))
- The Non-Domestic Rating (Telecommunications Apparatus) (Wales) Regulations 2000 (S.I. 2000 No. 3383 (W. 221 ))
- Rheoliadau Ardrethu Annomestig (Offer Telathrebu) (Cymru) 2000 (S.I. 2000 Rhif 3383 (Cy. 221))
- The Individual Learning Accounts (Wales) Regulations 2000 (S.I. 2000 No. 3384 (W. 222 ))
- Rheoliadau Cyfrifon Dysgu Unigol (Cymru) 2000 (S.I. 2000 Rhif 3384 (Cy. 222 ))
- The London Transport Pension Arrangements Order 2000 (S.I. 2000 No. 3386)
- The Specified Risk Material (Amendment) (Wales) (No. 2) Regulations 2000 (S.I. 2000 No. 3387 (W. 224))
- Rheoliadau Deunydd Risg Penodedig (Diwygio) (Cymru) (Rhif 2) 2000 (S.I. 2000 Rhif 3387 (Cy. 224))
- The Fresh Meat (Beef Controls) (No.2) (Amendment) (Wales) Regulations 2000 (S.I. 2000 No. 3388 (W.225))
- Rheoliadau Cig Ffres (Dulliau Rheoli Cig Eidion) (Rhif 2) (Diwygio) (Cymru) 2000 (S.I. 2000 Rhif 3388 (Cy. 225))
- The Tor Bay Harbour Revision Order 2000 (S.I. 2000 No. 3389)

== 3401–3500 ==
- The Mink Keeping (England) Order 2000 (S.I. 2000 No. 3402)
- The European Economic Interest Grouping (Fees) (Amendment) Regulations 2000 (S.I. 2000 No. 3412)

== See also ==
- List of statutory instruments of the United Kingdom
