= Consumer Protection (Distance Selling) Regulations 2000 =

- Statutory Instrument
- Parliament of the United Kingdom
- Citation: SI 2000/2334

Dates
- Made: 31 August 2000
- Laid before Parliament: 1 September 2000
- Commencement: 31 October 2000

Other legislation
- Made under: European Communities Act 1972
- Transposes: European Directive 97/7/EC
- Revoked by: Consumer Contracts (Information, Cancellation and Additional Charges) Regulations 2013

Status: Revoked

Text of statute as originally enacted

The Consumer Protection (Distance Selling) Regulations 2000 (SI 2000/2334) implemented (Note: Enacted pursuant to European Communities Act 1972) European Directive 97/7/EC as UK law. (Note: By Regulation 3(2) it is implied they apply in Scotland, and by 1(2) they are expressly extended to Northern Ireland.) They applied to contracts "concluded between a supplier and a consumer under an organised distance sales or services provision scheme run by the supplier who, for the purposes of the contract, makes use of one or more means of distance communication" up to and including the moment the contract is agreed. The legislation provided rights to the consumer and obligations which the seller must fulfill.

Typical cases where the regulations apply include goods or services ordered by telephone or over the Internet.

The regulations were revoked in June 2014 by the Consumer Contracts (Information, Cancellation and Additional Charges) Regulations 2013, which in many respects, however, are similar regulations.

== Definition of a consumer ==
A consumer is a "natural person who is acting for the purposes other than those of his trade, business or profession". The definition is slightly broader than that in the Unfair Contract Terms Act 1977, where the subjective requirement of the person not regarding himself as acting in the course of a business is not present. So, under the Regulations, someone who uses a company account or business details for tax obligations is still considered a consumer if the transaction is not one done for or on behalf of the business. A customer is a person who actually buys the product but this does not mean they have to use the product. The person who uses the product is called a consumer.

== Obligations imposed upon the supplier ==
The supplier's obligations are mostly covered by Regulation 7, although other obligations are made by other regulations.

=== Information to be communicated before contract formation ===
- Who the supplier is, and their address (if payment is made up front)
- A description of the goods or service
- The cost, inclusive of any tax
- Any delivery charge
- How payment should be made and how the goods or services will be delivered
- Notification of the right of cancellation (Regulations 10, 11 12 and 13)
- Communication costs for forming the contract (for example, the cost of a premium-rate telephone number)
- How long the contract offer is valid for
- How long the contract will last, if it is not a one-off performance

This information must be clear and comprehensible. Under Regulation 8 all this information must also be given to the consumer in a durable or storable medium along with all terms and conditions, a geographical address and, if the contract could last over a year, the conditions for taking contractual action.

=== Performance of the contract ===
The seller must perform the contract within thirty days of its being made. If a supplier cannot meet the contract, he must within another thirty days pay back any money and return any other property that the consumer used to secure the contract, and tell the consumer that he has done so.

== Rights of the consumer ==
=== Cancellation ===
If the supplier has provided all the information to be communicated before contract formation, the consumer has an automatic right to cancel and rescind a contract at any time from its formation until seven working days after the goods are delivered; or for service contracts, seven working days after the contract is formed (which might be before the service was to have been performed). From 13 June 2014 The Consumer Contracts (Information, Cancellation and Additional Charges) Regulations 2013 replaced the 2000 Regulations and in particular incorporate now a 14-day cancellation period, not seven days.

Where the supplier has not provided the consumer with all the required information, the consumer has an automatic right to rescind the contract within three months and seven days of delivery of the goods, or of formation of the contract (service contracts). The Consumer Contracts (Information, Cancellation and Additional Charges) Regulations 2013 (SI 2013/3134) replacing the 2000 regulations changed such 3-month period to 12 months

=== Effects of cancellation ===
Regulation 14 obliges the supplier to reimburse the consumer within thirty days of the consumer giving notice of cancellation (and to reimburse any delivery costs). Regulation 17 obliges the consumer to take reasonable care of goods and deliver them when the supplier comes to collect them.

Where there is an agreement that the consumer will return the goods by post, it is at the consumer's cost except if the goods are faulty or not as described as per the Sale of Goods Act 1979 in which case the supplier reimburses both the delivery and return costs

=== Fraudulent use of a payment card ===
Regulation 21 defines "Fraudulent use of a payment card". If a consumer's payment card is charged fraudulently, the money must be paid back to the consumer by the card issuer. The Consumer Credit Act 1974 makes a joint and several obligation on both the seller and the card issuer to refund money

=== Unsolicited goods ===
If goods are sent to a consumer without a contract asking for them, the "recipient may [...] use, deal with, or dispose of the goods as if they were an unconditional gift to him" and "[t]he rights of the sender to the goods are extinguished". This is intended to prevent companies purporting to demand payment for goods a consumer receives unexpectedly. This provision amends the Unsolicited Goods Act 1971, which defines goods only as unsolicited goods if they have been deliberately sent to the recipient with the intention of them being used.

=== Extinction of consumer rights ===
No contractual term can limit or exclude the legal liability of a supplier for the provisions of the Act if the contractual term is inconsistent with consumer protection legislation.

== Excepted contracts ==
Regulation 5 explicitly excludes some kinds of contract from being governed by the Regulations. These are contracts that are:

(a) Made for the sale or other disposition of an interest in land except for a rental agreement
(b) Made for the construction of a building where the contract also provides for a sale or other disposition of an interest in land on which the building is constructed, except for a rental agreement
(c) Relating to financial services, a non-exhaustive list of which is contained in Schedule 2
(d) Concluded by means of an automated vending machine or automated commercial premises
(e) Concluded with a telecommunications operator through the use of a public payphone
(f) Concluded at an auction.

The legal definition of what constitutes a rental agreement differs between England and Wales, Scotland, Northern Ireland and places outside of the United Kingdom, but the Regulations encompass the differences to bring a common sense definition to what is, and what is not, a rental agreement

== Enforcement ==
The Regulations are enforced by the Director-General of Fair Trade and the Office of Fair Trading (OFT). Complaints are made directly to the Director-General and the OFT then investigates infringements, issues injunctions and litigates on behalf of the consumer.

== See also ==
- Electronic Commerce Regulations 2002
- Supply of Goods and Services Act 1982
- Sale of Goods Act 1979
- Unfair Contract Terms Act 1977
- Unfair Terms in Consumer Contracts Regulations 1999
