= List of statutory instruments of the United Kingdom, 2000 =

For lists of statutory instruments of the United Kingdom, 2000, see:

- List of statutory instruments of the United Kingdom, 2000 (1–1700)
- List of statutory instruments of the United Kingdom, 2000 (1701–3500)
