= Unsolicited goods =

Unsolicited goods are, in British law, goods delivered to an individual with a view to the individual acquiring them, but where the individual has no reasonable cause to believe that they were delivered for legitimate business and had not previously agreed to acquire them.

== Legislation ==
Unsolicited goods were regulated under the Unsolicited Goods Act 1971 but the Consumer Protection (Distance Selling) Regulations 2000 are stricter in every respect rendering the 1971 Act largely redundant from a consumer law perspective, although there is no express repeal. However the said distance selling regulations only apply to consumers so a business receiving the goods on an unsolicited basis would need to look at the 1971 Act. Also with effect from 14 June 2014 the distance regulations are replaced by The Consumer Contracts (Information, Cancellation and Additional Charges) Regulations 2013 which include a new s 29A added to the Consumer Protection from Unfair Trading Regulations 2008 making it clear the consumer may keep unsolicited goods. The 2008 regulations prohibit as a criminal offence various unfair advertising and marketing practices and in paragraph 29 of Schedule 1 make it a criminal offence to engage in "Demanding immediate or deferred payment for or the return or safekeeping of products supplied by the trader, but not solicited by the consumer, except where the product is a substitute supplied in accordance with regulation 19(7) of the Consumer Protection (Distance Selling) Regulations 2000 (inertia selling)".

== Rights of the recipient ==
The "recipient may [...] use, deal with, or dispose of the goods as if they were an unconditional gift to him" and "[t]he rights of the sender to the goods are extinguished".

== Criminal liability of the sender ==
Under the Consumer Protection Regulations 2000 it is a criminal offence to:

- Assert a right of payment for the goods.
- Threaten to take legal action with regard to the goods.
- Threaten to place the recipient's name on a 'black-list'.
- Invoke or threaten to invoke any collection procedure.

This is important as if the individual is not aware that they have legal title to the goods, they may unjustly enrich the sender. The penalty is a fine up to Level 5 on the standard scale, except the first offence which is measured up to Level 4 on the standard scale

Under regulation 39 of The Consumer Contracts (Information, Cancellation and Additional Charges) Regulations 2013 from 13 January 2014 the following section is included in the 2008 regulations mentioned above

Inertia selling

27A.
(1) This regulation applies where a trader engages in the unfair commercial practice described in paragraph 29 of Schedule 1 (inertia selling).

(2) The consumer is exempted from any obligation to provide consideration for the products supplied by the trader.

(3) The absence of a response from the consumer following the supply does not constitute consent to the provision of consideration for, or the return or safekeeping of, the products.

(4) In the case of an unsolicited supply of goods, the consumer may, as between the consumer and the trader, use, deal with or dispose of the goods as if they were an unconditional gift to the consumer.

This replaces the provision in the 2000 distance regulations with effect from 13 June 2014. Regulation 40 deals with additional payments demanded under a contract and regulation 41 deals with where a helpline charges over the basic rate (another form of unsolicited supply).

== See also ==
- The Consumer Contracts (Information, Cancellation and Additional Charges) Regulations 2013
- The Consumer Protection from Unfair Trading Regulations 2008
- Consumer Protection (Distance Selling) Regulations 2000
- Uniform Commercial Code, United States law
