= European consumer law =

EU consumer protection law

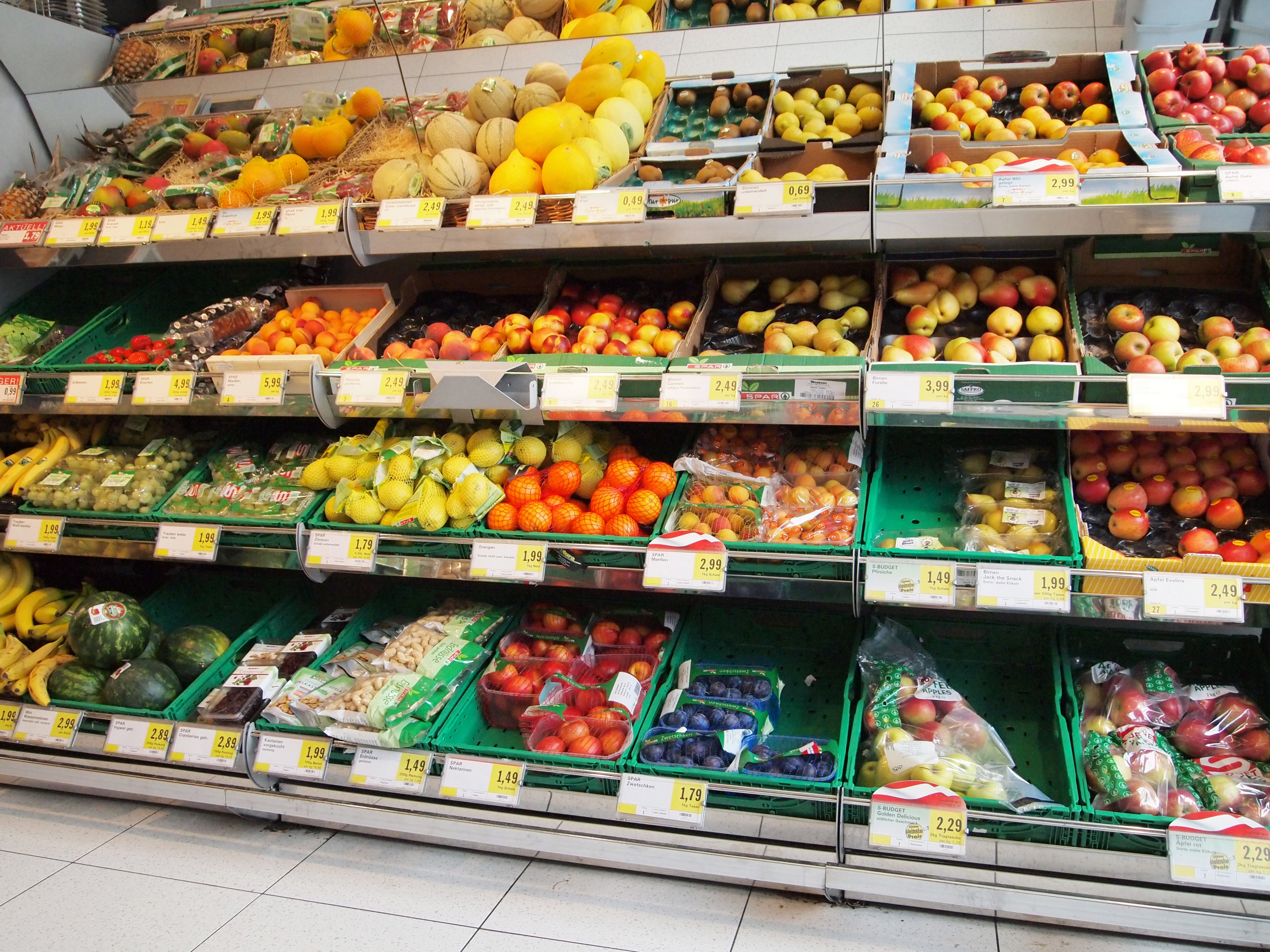
Due to their unequal bargaining power, consumers are entitled to a legislative "charter of rights" to safe and healthy products, fair terms, proper information free from misleading advertising and marketing, and rights of cancellation.

European consumer law concerns consumer protection within Europe, particularly through European Union law and the European Convention on Human Rights. Article 169 of the Treaty on the Functioning of the European Union enables the EU to use its ordinary legislative procedure to protect consumers "health, safety and economic interests" and promote rights to "information, education and to organise themselves in order to safeguard their interests". All member states may grant higher protection, and a "high level of consumer protection" is regarded as a fundamental right. Consumers are entitled to a legislative "charter of rights" to safe and healthy products, fair terms, proper information free from misleading advertising and marketing, and rights of cancellation. Beyond these general principles, and outside specific sectors, there are four main Directives: the Product Liability Directive 1985, Unfair Terms in Consumer Contracts Directive 1993, Unfair Commercial Practices Directive 2005 and the Consumer Rights Directive 2011, requiring information and cancellation rights for consumers. As a whole, the law is designed to ensure that consumers in the EU are entitled to the same minimum rights wherever they make their transactional decisions, and largely follows inspiration from theories of consumer protection developed in California, and the Consumer Bill of Rights proclaimed by John F. Kennedy in May 1962. The European Court of Justice has continually affirmed the importance of ensuring more consumer rights than in commercial contracts, both because of information asymmetry, and inequality of bargaining power.

== History ==
The Product Liability Directive 1985 was the first consumer protection measure. It creates strict enterprise liability for all producers and retailers for any harm to consumers from products, as a way to promote basic standards of health and safety. Any producer, or supplier if the ultimate producer is insolvent, of a product is strictly liable to compensate a consumer for any damage caused by a defective product. A "defect" is anything which falls below what a consumer is entitled to expect, and this essentially means that products should be safe for their purpose. A narrow defense is available if a producer can show that a defect could not be known by any scientific method, thought this has never been successfully invoked, because it is generally thought a profit making enterprise should not be able to externalise the risks of its activities.

The Unfair Terms in Consumer Contracts Directive 1993 was the second main measure. Under article 3(1) a term is unfair, and not binding, if it is not "individually negotiated| and "if, contrary to the requirement of good faith, it causes a significant imbalance in the parties' rights and obligations arising under the contract, to the detriment of the consumer". The Court of Justice has continually affirmed that the Directive, as recital 16 states, "is based on the idea that the consumer is in a weak position vis-à-vis the seller or supplier, as regards both his bargaining power and his level of knowledge". Terms which are very skewed, are to be conclusively regarded as contrary to "good faith" and therefore unfair. For example, in RWE AG v Verbraucherzentrale NRW eV, clauses in gas supply contracts enabling the German utiliies company RWE to vary unilaterally prices were stated by the European Court of Justice to be insufficiently transparent, and therefore unfair. In Brusse v Jahani BV the Court of Justice of the European Union advised that clauses in a tenancy contract requiring tenants pay €25 per day were likely unfair, and would have to be entirely void without replacement, if they were not substituted with more precise mandatory terms in national legislation. In Aziz v Caixa d'Estalvis de Catalunya, after the 2008 financial crisis, the European Court of Justice advised that even terms regarding repossession of homes in Spain had to be assessed for fairness by national courts. In Kušionová v SMART Capital a.s., the Court of Justice of the European Union held that consumer law was to be interpreted in the light of fundamental rights, including the right to housing, in the event that a home could be repossessed. Because consumer law operates through Directives, national courts have the final say on applying the general principles set out by the European Court of Justice's case law.

The EU's Directive 98/6/EC, published on 16 February 1998 with a transposition deadline of 18 March 2000, was concerned with "consumer protection in the indication of the prices of products offered to consumers".

The European Commission announced a "New Deal for Consumers" in April 2018, which put forward plans to strengthen consumer law and the coordination of consumer rights enforcement by national authorities. The "new deal" involved updating the directives on unfair terms in consumer contracts, price indications, unfair business practices and consumer rights, along with a proposal to replace the existing injunctions directive with a directive on "representative actions for the protection of the collective interests of consumers".

== See also ==
- Second Bill of Rights
- Consumer Bill of Rights
- Treaty on the Functioning of the European Union article 169, on consumer protection
- Unfair Commercial Practices Directive 2005/29/EC
- Consumer Rights Directive 2011/83/EU
- Payment Services Directive 2007/64/EC
- Late Payments Directive 2011/7/EU

=== Human rights ===
- European Convention on Human Rights
- Charter of Fundamental Rights, guarantee a high level of consumer protection

=== Product safety ===
- Product Liability Directive 85/374/EEC
- General Product Safety Directive 2001/95/EC ("GPS Directive")

=== Unfair terms ===
- Unfair Consumer Contract Terms Directive 93/13/EC

=== Information and withdrawal ===
- Consumer Rights Directive 2011/83/EU
- Gebr. Weber GMBH v Jürgen Wittmer and Ingrid Putz v Medianess Electronics GmbH (2011) C-65/09 & C-87/09 under the former Consumer Sales and Guarantees Directive 1999/44/EC note

=== Marketing ===
- Unfair Commercial Practices Directive 2005/29/EC

=== Specific sectors ===
- Flight Delay Compensation Regulation 261/2004
- Electronic Commerce Directive,
- Payment Services Directive 2007/64/EC

=== Other business regulation ===
- Late Payments Directive 2011/7/EU
- Markets in Financial Instruments Directive 2004/39/EC

=== General ===
- EU law
- English contract law
