= Consumer Protection from Unfair Trading Regulations 2008 =

United Kingdom Statutory Instrument

Consumer Protection from Unfair Trading Regulations 2008 (Note: Section 1.)
- Statutory Instrument
- Parliament of the United Kingdom
- Citation: SI 2008/1277
- Introduced by: Gareth Thomas
- Territorial extent: England and Wales; Northern Ireland; Scotland

Dates
- Made: 8 May 2008
- Laid before Parliament: 3 March 2008
- Commencement: 26 May 2008
- Revoked: 6 April 2025

Other legislation
- Amends: Trade Descriptions Act 1968; Administration of Justice Act 1970; Hallmarking Act 1973; Customs and Excise Management Act 1979; Airports Act 1986; Courts and Legal Services Act 1990; Water Industry Act 1991; Water Resources Act 1991; Coal Industry Act 1994; etc.
- Repeals/revokes: Fraudulent Mediums Act 1951; Mock Auctions Act 1961; etc.
- Made under: European Communities Act 1972
- Transposes: Unfair Commercial Practices Directive 2005
- Revoked by: Digital Markets, Competition and Consumers Act 2024

Status: Revoked

Text of statute as originally enacted

Revised text of statute as amended

Text of the Consumer Protection from Unfair Trading Regulations 2008 as in force today (including any amendments) within the United Kingdom, from legislation.gov.uk.

The Consumer Protection from Unfair Trading Regulations 2008 (SI 2008/1277) is a statutory instrument in the United Kingdom made under the European Communities Act 1972. It came into force on 26 May 2008. It is effectively the successor to the Trade Descriptions Act 1968 (c. 29), which it largely repeals. It was designed to implement the Unfair Commercial Practices Directive, as part of a common set of European minimum standards for consumer protection.

== Contents ==
The regulations introduce new rules about consumer protection and the responsibility of businesses to trade fairly. It places a general duty on traders not to trade unfairly.

The regulations also include a blacklist of 31 banned trading practices.

The regulations replaced the Fraudulent Mediums Act 1951.

== Enforcement ==
In February 2011, Safestyle UK became the first company to be prosecuted under the regulations. In an action brought by North Lincolnshire Council Trading Standards Department they were found guilty under paragraph 25 (ignoring a request not to return) and fined £4000 with £18,000 costs for repeatedly calling on a consumer in Scunthorpe.

Also in 2011 in OFT v Ashbourne Management Services Ltd and others, [2011] EWHC 1237, the High Court ruled that certain minimum gym membership periods and cancellation notices contravened the Unfair Terms in Consumer Contracts Regulations 1999, and also that the defendants' debt collection practices, whereby they threatened to report members credit reference agencies as being in default, contravened the 2008 Regulations.

== See also ==
- Unfair Commercial Practices Directive
- Unfair Terms in Consumer Contracts Directive
- Product Liability Directive
- English contract law
- EU law
