= Brusse v Jahani BV =

- Court: European Court of Justice
- Citation: (2013) C-488/11, [2013] 3 CMLR 45

Keywords
- Consumer protection, unfair contract terms

Brusse v Jahani BV (2013) C-488/11 is an EU consumer protection case concerned with Unfair Terms in Consumer Contracts Directive. It emphasises the foundations of consumer protection on addressing inequality of bargaining power and imbalances in information.

== Facts ==
Mr Asbeek Brusse had a residential tenancy with Jahani BV, a corporation whose business was being a landlord. The tenancy agreement had a penalty clause requiring the tenant pay €25 per day for not fulfilling any obligation under the agreement. When Brusse stopped paying the rent, Jahani BV claimed €5,462 in unpaid rent and €8,325 in penalties.

== Judgment ==
=== Dutch Courts ===
The Dutch district court upheld Jahani BV's claims. The Regional Court of Appeal referred the question to the European Court of Justice (ECJ), asking (1) did the tenancy fall within the Directive's scope, (2) was the national court itself obliged to determine if the contract term was unfair and annul the term under art 6, (3) could it mitigate the penalty or disapply the clause as a whole?

=== European Court of Justice ===
The ECJ held that the Unfair Terms in Consumer Contracts Directive was based on consumers being in a weaker position, both regarding bargaining power and knowledge. Consumers might have no chance to influence terms drawn up in advance. The inequality for the consumer was aggravated where the contract related to an essential need, namely lodging. However, under article 1(2) contractual terms subject to mandatory statutory provisions of national law were not subject to the Directive, as in the RWE case. The national court would determine whether this was true. Imbalances that consumers face can only be corrected by positive action unconnected to the parties to the contract. The national court had to itself assess whether a contract term is unfair, referring to Banco Espanol v Camino and Banif Plus v Csipai. If a national court can, it must assess the validity of a measure in light of national public policy rules. A contract, under art 6(1) which has unfair terms continues in existence, apart from the unfair terms. It followed that a national court cannot reduce a penalty amount instead of excluding the clause entirely in its operation against the consumer.

The Court's judgment included the following:

30. It is therefore by reference to the capacity of the contracting parties, according to whether or not they are acting for purposes relating to their trade, business or profession, that the directive defines the contracts to which it applies.

31. That criterion corresponds to the idea on which the system of protection implemented by the directive is based, namely that the consumer is in a weak position vis-à-vis the seller or supplier, as regards both his bargaining power and his level of knowledge. This leads to the consumer agreeing to terms drawn up in advance by the seller or supplier without being able to influence the content of those terms (see, inter alia, Case C‑618/10 Banco Español de Crédito [2012] ECR, paragraph 39, and Case C‑472/11 Banif Plus Bank [2013] ECR, paragraph 19).

32. That protection is particularly important in the case of a residential tenancy agreement concluded between, on the one hand, an individual acting on a non-commercial basis and, on the other hand, a real estate professional. The consequences of the inequality existing between the parties are aggravated by the fact that, from an economic perspective, such a contract relates to an essential need of the consumer, namely to obtain lodging, and involves sums which most frequently, for the tenant, represent one of the most significant items in his budget, while, from a legal perspective, this is a contract which, as a general rule, is covered by complex national rules about which individuals are often poorly informed.

33. It must, however, be observed that, in accordance with Article 1(2) of the directive, contractual terms which reflect mandatory statutory or regulatory provisions of national law are not subject to the provisions of the directive (see Case C‑92/11 RWE Vertrieb [2013] ECR, paragraph 25). It is a matter for the national court to ascertain whether that is true of the terms which are the subject of the dispute pending before it.

34. In the light of the foregoing, the answer to the first question is therefore that the directive must be interpreted as meaning that, subject to contractual terms which reflect mandatory statutory or regulatory provisions set out by national law, which is a matter for the national court to ascertain, it applies to a residential tenancy agreement concluded between a landlord acting for purposes relating to his trade, business or profession and a tenant acting for purposes which do not relate to his trade, business or profession.

[...]

54. By its third question, the referring court is essentially asking whether Article 6 of the directive can be interpreted as meaning that it allows a national court, in the case where it has established that a penalty clause is unfair, instead of disapplying that clause, merely to mitigate the amount of the penalty provided for by that clause, as it is authorised to do by the national law and as the consumer has requested.

55. First of all, it should be stated that point 1(e) of the annex to that directive mentions, among the terms which may be declared unfair within the meaning of Article 3(3) of that directive, terms which have the object or effect of requiring any consumer who fails to fulfil his obligation to pay a disproportionately high sum in compensation. The Court has held in that regard that, while the content of that annex does not suffice in itself to establish automatically the unfair nature of a contested term, it is nevertheless an essential element on which the competent court may base its assessment as to the unfair nature of that term (Case C‑472/10 Invitel [2012] ECR, paragraph 26).

56. As regards the issue of whether the national court, in the case where it has established that a penalty clause is unfair, can merely mitigate the amount of the penalty provided for by that clause, as it is authorised to do in the present case by Article 94(1) of the BW, it must be observed that it is expressly provided in the second part of Article 6(1) of the directive that the contract concluded between the seller or supplier and the consumer is to continue to bind the parties 'upon those terms' if it is capable of continuing in existence 'without the unfair terms'.

57. The Court has inferred from that wording of Article 6(1) that national courts are required to exclude the application of an unfair contractual term in order that it does not produce binding effects with regard to the consumer, without being authorised to revise the content of that term. That contract must continue in existence, in principle, without any amendment other than that resulting from the deletion of the unfair terms, in so far as, in accordance with the rules of domestic law, such continuity of the contract is legally possible (Banco Español de Crédito, paragraph 65).

58. The Court has also observed that that interpretation is, moreover, borne out by the objective and overall scheme of the directive. In this connection, it has pointed out that, given the nature and significance of the public interest which constitutes the basis of the protection guaranteed to consumers, the directive requires Member States, as is apparent from Article 7(1) thereof, to provide for adequate and effective means 'to prevent the continued use of unfair terms in contracts concluded with consumers by sellers or suppliers'. If it were open to the national court to revise the content of unfair terms included in such contracts, such a power would be liable to compromise attainment of the long-term objective of Article 7 of the directive, since it would weaken the dissuasive effect on sellers or suppliers of the straightforward non‑application of those unfair terms with regard to the consumer (Banco Español de Crédito, paragraphs 66 to 69).

== See also ==
- EU law
- English contract law
