= Banco Español de Crédito SA v Camino =

- European Court of Justice

Decided 14 June 2012
- Full case name: Banco Español de Crédito SA v Joaquín Calderón Camino,
- Case: C-618/10
- CelexID: 62010CJ0618
- ECLI: ECLI:EU:C:2012:349
- Nationality of parties: Spanish

Court composition
- Advocate General; Verica Trstenjak

Keywords
- Contract, remedies

Banco Español de Crédito SA v Camino (2012) Case C-618/10 is a European Court of Justice (ECJ) case relevant to contract law, concerning the scope of consumer protection under the Unfair Terms Directive under EU law.

== Facts ==
Calderon Camino borrowed €30,000 from Banesto to buy a car at 7.95% interest, and APR 8.89%, and 29% on late payments. Banesto claimed €29,381.95 for unpaid monthly repayments, interest and costs.

The court of first instance handling the case held the 29% rate to be automatically unfair, given that it was 20% above the nominal, fixing the rate instead at 19%. Banesto complained that the consumer had not asked for this, and said national law prevented a court assessing a term for unfairness on its own motion. The Barcelona Provincial Court referred the question to the ECJ.

== Judgment ==
The European Court of Justice's First Chamber held that the court had the right and the duty to assess the fairness of a clause. However, it could not substitute an interest rate: it had to find the interest rate void, while leaving the rest of the contract intact.

The first question

38. By its first question, the referring court is essentially asking whether Directive 93/13 must be interpreted as precluding legislation of a Member State, such as that at issue in the main proceedings, which does not allow the court before which an application for an order for payment has been brought to assess of its own motion, in limine litis or at any other stage during the proceedings, whether a term relating to interest on late payments contained in a contract concluded between a seller or supplier and a consumer is unfair, in the case where that consumer has not lodged an objection.

39. For the purpose of replying to that question, it is appropriate to note, first, that the system of protection introduced by Directive 93/13 is based on the idea that the consumer is in a weak position vis-à-vis the seller or supplier, as regards both his bargaining power and his level of knowledge. This leads to the consumer agreeing to terms drawn up in advance by the seller or supplier without being able to influence the content of those terms (Joined Cases C-240/98 to C-244/98 Océano Grupo Editorial and Salvat Editores [2000] ECR I-4941, paragraph 25; Case C-168/05 Mostaza Claro [2006] ECR I-10421, paragraph 25; and Case C-40/08 Asturcom Telecomunicaciones [2009] ECR I-9579, paragraph 29).

40. As regards that weaker position, Article 6(1) of Directive 93/13 provides that unfair terms are not binding on the consumer. As is apparent from the case-law, that is a mandatory provision which aims to replace the formal balance which the contract establishes between the rights and obligations of the parties with an effective balance which re-establishes equality between them (see Mostaza Claro, paragraph 36; Asturcom Telecomunicaciones, paragraph 30; Case C-137/08 VB Pénzügyi Lízing [2010] ECR I-10847, paragraph 47; and C-453/10 Pereničová and Perenič [2012] ECR, paragraph 28).

41. In order to guarantee the protection intended by Directive 93/13, the Court has already stated on several occasions that the imbalance which exists between the consumer and the seller or supplier may be corrected only by positive action unconnected with the actual parties to the contract (see Océano Grupo Editorial and Salvat Editores, paragraph 27; Mostaza Claro, paragraph 26; Asturcom Telecomunicaciones, paragraph 31; and VB Pénzügyi Lízing, paragraph 48).

42. It is in the light of those principles that the Court has therefore held that the national court is required to assess of its own motion whether a contractual term falling within the scope of Directive 93/13 is unfair, compensating in this way for the imbalance which exists between the consumer and the seller or supplier (see, to that effect, Mostaza Claro, paragraph 38; Case C-243/08 Pannon GSM [2009] ECR I-4713, paragraph 31; Asturcom Telecomunicaciones, paragraph 32; and VB Pénzügyi Lízing, paragraph 49).

[...]

69. In that context, it is clear, as the Advocate General observed in points 86 to 88 of her Opinion, that, if it were open to the national court to revise the content of unfair terms included in such contracts, such a power would be liable to compromise attainment of the long-term objective of Article 7 of Directive 93/13. That power would contribute to eliminating the dissuasive effect on sellers or suppliers of the straightforward non-application with regard to the consumer of those unfair terms (see, to that effect, the order in Pohotovost’, paragraph 41 and the case-law cited), in so far as those sellers or suppliers would remain tempted to use those terms in the knowledge that, even if they were declared invalid, the contract could nevertheless be modified, to the extent necessary, by the national court in such a way as to safeguard the interest of those sellers or suppliers.

== See also ==
- English contract law
- EU law
