= Pre-order =

Order placed for an item that has not yet been released

A pre-order is an order placed for an item that has not yet been released. The idea for pre-orders came because people found it hard to get popular items in stores because of their popularity. Companies then had the idea to allow customers to reserve their personal copy before its release, which has been a huge success.

Pre-orders allow consumers to guarantee immediate shipment on release, manufacturers can gauge how much demand there will be and thus the size of initial production runs, and sellers can be assured of minimum sales. Additionally, high pre-order rates can be used to increase sales further.

== Pre-order incentive ==
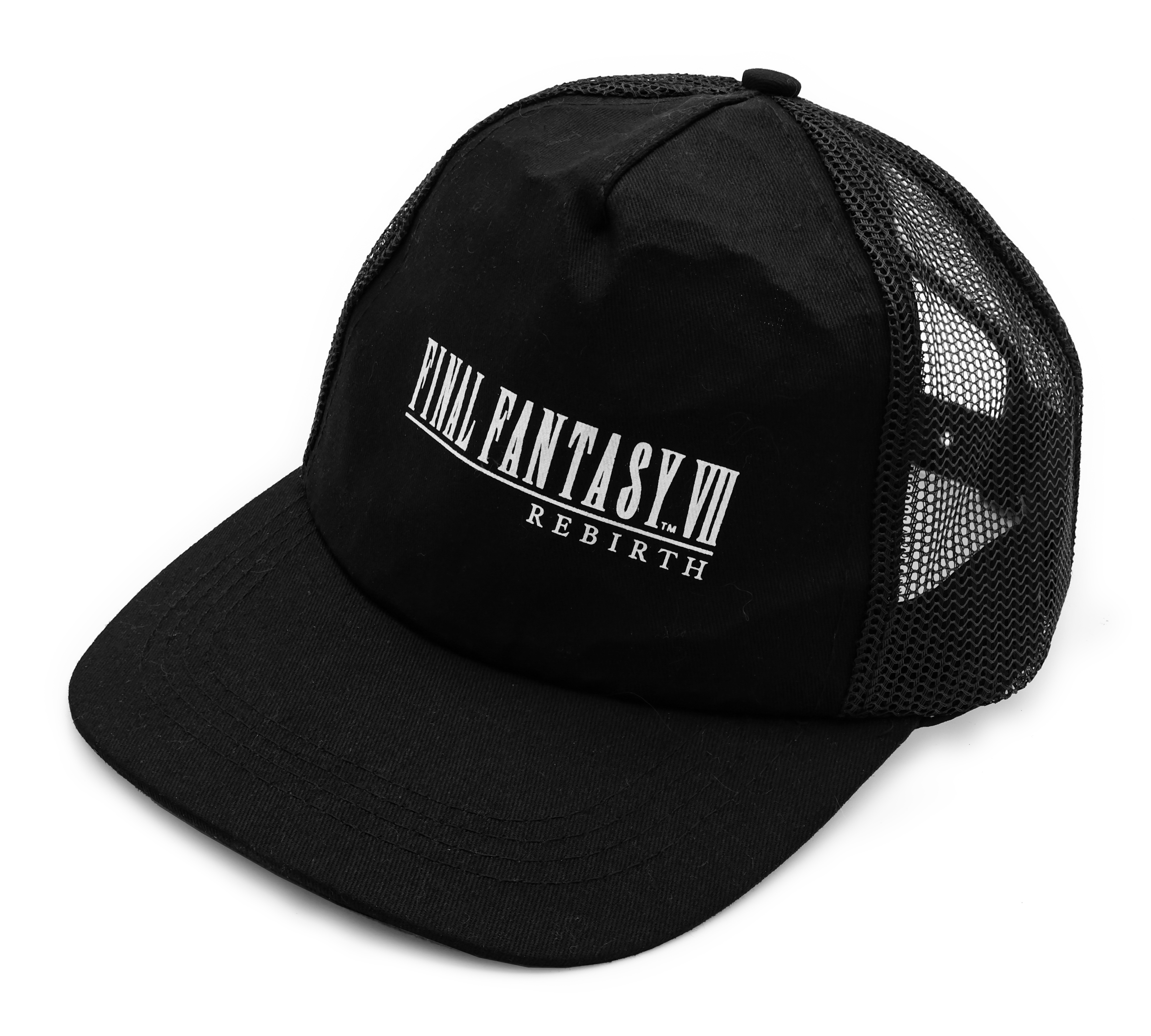
A trucker cap offered as a pre-order incentive by Gamestop for Final Fantasy VII Rebirth (2024)

Pre-order incentive, also known as pre-order bonus, is a marketing tactic in which a retailer or manufacturer/publisher of a product (usually a book or video game) encourages buyers to reserve a copy of the product at the store prior to its release.

Reasons vary, but typically, publishers wish to ensure strong initial sales for a product, and the offered incentive is used to induce shoppers who might otherwise wait for positive reviews or a specific shopping period, like the holiday season, to commit to a purchase. Having paid for part or all of the purchase when placing the order, the consumers will usually complete the transaction shortly after the product's release, often on its first day in stores. Individual stores or retail chains may also offer bonuses for a popularly anticipated product to ensure that the customer chooses to buy at that location, rather than from a competitor.

The pre-order bonus may be as simple as a discount on the item's purchase price or other related merchandise, another marketing strategy, or it may be an actual item or set of items. The items may be related merchandise or exclusive items available only through the pre-order program.

== In video games ==
Until around 2000, the primary distribution method for video games were through physical media such as CD-ROMs, DVDs, or game cartridges, including packaging and instruction manuals. Preparing enough copies for vendors to purchase and sell to consumers on the release day required a significant amount of market forecasting. Episodes in the industry's past, such as the 1983 video game crash, had made publishers wary of producing in great excess to avoid the situation that led to the Atari video game burial. On the other hand, having too few copies available at the game's launch can lead to consumer dissatisfaction.

Retailers like GameStop and Amazon.com discovered in the early 2000s that the pre-ordering mechanism helped with forecasts, as they could order a reasonable number of copies of new games based on pre-order interest, which, in turn, helped publishers to determine how many physical units to create. Then, pre-orders were usually placed by providing the vendor with a small percentage of the game's cost to hold their reservation (such as $5 or $10 on a $50 game), with assurances they would receive their copy on release day after paying the remaining balance. Retailers would be able to use pre-order money towards other investments, effectively accruing some interest on the pre-order fee.

As the video game market grew with some widely popular series like Call of Duty and Grand Theft Auto, publishers would prepare by printing large runs of the games and having them ready to ship to retailers so that even consumers who failed to pre-order would likely be able to get a copy within a day or two of release, negating the primary drivers to pre-order. Furthermore, digital distribution eliminated the need for retail versions started to take off, as there is effectively no fixed volume of digital copies.

Then, publishers and retailers started to turn to other methods to encourage pre-orders. Publishers created limited edition packages that would include additional physical items with the game, such as art books, soundtrack CDs, or figurines of the game's characters. Such editions would be published only in limited numbers encouraging consumers to pre-order early to reserve one. Retailers made deals with publishers to allow for unique content for the game that could be obtained only by pre-orders through that vendor.

Pre-ordering is a part of most major releases but is now a significant point of contention. Some consumers believe pre-ordering to be a waste and do not believe that any kind of incentive is truly worth a marked up price of sometimes over twice the original price for certain digital in-game pre-order bonuses, which may be released as free downloadable content sometime later after the game's original release. Others have pointed out that with the pre-ordering process, publishers can effectively assure a sale of the game to those consumers and so can release the game in an unfinished state or missing certain features to that captive audience, but without pre-orders, critical reviews of a game released in such a state would have harmed their sales. That itself then leads to issues of promotion and marketing of how to sell a game as to gain pre-orders, which can lead to some potentially deceptive practices. In some cases, a game can be significantly delayed or even canceled, making the pre-ordering process useless.

In most cases, a pre-order can be refunded to the purchaser prior to release. However, Nintendo had a policy for digital pre-orders that does not allow such refunds. Consumer authorities in Germany and Norway took Nintendo to court in 2019, arguing this practice violated the Consumer Rights Directive 2011 for the European Union. The court ruled in January 2020 that Nintendo's practice does not violate the directive, though the German consumer authority does plan to appeal the ruling. In December 2021, the appeals court reversed the original ruling, finding that a locked video game file wasn't sufficient for a right of revocation. Between the original ruling and the appeals ruling, Nintendo introduced a new policy that would only charge for pre-orders 7 days in advance of the release date, and allowed for cancelations of pre-orders before that time.

== See also ==
- Crowdfunding
