= Prompt payment =

Prompt payment is a commercial discipline which requires businesses to:

- agree fair and reasonable payment terms with their suppliers
- ensure suppliers' invoices are approved and paid within agreed terms
- encourage adoption of the same practices throughout their supply chain.

It is the opposite of late payment, to which the European Union's Late Payments Directive and the Late Payment of Commercial Debts (Interest) Act 1998 in the United Kingdom are directed. Prompt payment may also be contrasted with excessively long or grossly unfair payment terms, such as payment terms in excess of 60 days, even where such terms are honoured by the business making payment. Other terminology adopted to express this discipline includes "fair payment", for example in the construction industry, and "responsible payment", a term used by the UK Government when countering what was seen as a "late payment culture".

== United Kingdom ==
In the UK, businesses are encouraged to sign the Prompt Payment Code to testify to their commitment to adopting a prompt payment culture. As at 15 August 2016, 1831 businesses had signed the code. The Code is hosted and administered for the UK government by the Chartered Institute of Credit Management. The government issued a consultation document in February 2015 aimed at "challenging grossly unfair payment terms" and "strengthening the Prompt Payment Code", and a further "Call for Evidence" in October 2018 aimed at "creating a responsible payment culture". Section 3 of the Small Business, Enterprise and Employment Act 2015 made further provision for companies to have a "duty to publish report on payment practices and performance" (subject to regulations which, as at August 2016, had not yet been brought forward). The government also made provision in section 28 of the Enterprise Act 2016 to penalise delayed payment of insurance claims. Companies wishing to improve their payment practices are invited to complete and submit a PPC Action Plan outlining their improvement intentions and related timescales.

The first investigation undertaken by the Groceries Code Adjudicator, announced on 5 February 2015 and reported in January 2016, looked into the supply chain practices of Tesco plc and found evidence that Tesco supplier payments were being frequently delayed.

In April 2019, Sisk Group was removed and six other major construction businesses were suspended from the UK Government’s Prompt Payment Code for failing to pay suppliers on time. A further 18 companies were removed from the list in July 2019.

Central government departments, their executive agencies and non-departmental public bodies in the UK are required to take suppliers' approaches to prompt payment into account when awarding "major contracts", i.e. contracts with an anticipated value over £5 million per year. A supplier's "approach" is assessed by including a standard set of questions within tender documentation issued after 1 September 2019, which are concerned with ensuring that major contract suppliers operate "an effective and reliable supply chain management system" which pays suppliers promptly, including suppliers and sub-contractors of any tier in the supply chain which "execute any works, supply any products or provide any services" substantially for the major contract. Cabinet Office guidance states that "payment of 95% of all supply chain invoices (excluding internal payments between parts of the same company) within 60 days is considered an appropriate measure of overall payment promptness".

== United States ==
In the United States, prompt payment of federal government supplier debts is enshrined in Title 31 of the United States Code, chapter 39 being known as the 'Prompt Payment Act'. The California Legislature has implemented a comprehensive series of laws known as the 'prompt payment statutes'.

== Further information ==
- Chartered Institute of Credit Management website
- Formsome website
