= McCann v United Kingdom =

- Court: European Court of Human Rights
- Citation: [2008] ECHR 385

Keywords
- Right to a home

McCann v United Kingdom [2008] ECHR 385 is a European Court of Human Rights case, concerning the right to a home. It was cited in Kušionová v SMART Capital a.s. by the European Court of Justice as being important for the interpretation of the Unfair Terms in Consumer Contracts Directive.

== Facts ==
Gerrard McCann and his wife lived as joint tenants of a house owned by the Birmingham City Council with their two children. In early 2001, the wife secured an ouster order and a three-month non-molestation order against McCann, after alleging his domestic violence caused them to flee the home. McCann was not represented at this hearing, but complied with the ouster order. Allegedly, he returned nine days later and assaulted the wife and one other person present after using a crowbar to break into the home. Criminal charges were brought against him, but he was acquitted after no evidence was brought. The wife applied for and was granted new housing under the Council's domestic violence policy. She returned the keys to the Council with a note saying she was giving up tenancy of the home.

The Council inspected the house and found it uninhabitable, due to fixtures being removed. McCann subsequently moved back into the home and renovated it by replacing the fixtures, all without the Council's knowledge. The Council only became aware once he submitted an application for exchange of accommodation in January 2002. On the same day the application was submitted, a Council Officer went to McCann's wife and acquired her signature on a formal notice to quit tenancy. A week later, she wrote to rescind this notice, saying she had not been informed this would end her husband's tenancy as well. Nevertheless, the local authorities began eviction proceedings against McCann. After various appeals, he was formally evicted on 22 March 2005.

== See also ==
- EU law
- English contract law
