= Kušionová v SMART Capital a.s. =

EU law and consumer protection case

- Court: European Court of Justice
- Citation: Case C-34/13

Keywords
- Consumer protection, unfair contract terms

Kušionová v SMART Capital a.s. (2014) Case C-34/13 is an EU law and consumer protection case, concerning the Unfair Terms in Consumer Contracts Directive. It emphasises the foundations of consumer protection on inequality of bargaining power and imbalances in information.

== Facts ==
Mrs Monika Kušionová claimed that a contract term allowing a bank to take possession of her home without court review was unfair under the Unfair Terms in Consumer Contracts Directive. She had taken out a loan of €10,000 from Smart Capital, secured on her home in Slovakia. The charge allowed for enforcement without any review by a court. This term derived from the Civi Code §151j. Before the hearing and judgment of the ECJ, the Slovak legislature had amended the Code to allow for review by a court.

== Judgment ==
=== Slovak courts ===
The District Court held that some of the terms were unfair, including the charge agreement. The Regional Court made a reference, asking whether a term deriving from a statutory provision could be regarded as unfair under the Unfair Contract Terms Directive 93/13/EC.

=== European Court of Justice ===
The Court of Justice held that if national law allowed for a court review of unfair terms before the loss of property, and a complete remedy, then legislation allowing recovery of a debt is not precluded. It said the legal context of the dispute included the Charter article 7, which requires 'Everyone has the right to respect for his or her private and family life' and article 38 requires a high level of consumer protection.

48. Secondly, in its case-law, the Court has already held that the system of protection introduced by Directive 93/13 is based on the idea that the consumer is in a weak position vis-à-vis the seller or supplier, as regards both his bargaining power and his level of knowledge. This leads to the consumer agreeing to terms drawn up in advance by the seller or supplier without being able to influence the content of those terms (judgments in Pohotovosť, EU:C:2014:101, paragraph 39 and case-law cited; Kásler and Káslerné Rábai, C‑26/13, EU:C:2014:282 paragraph 39 and the case-law cited; and Sánchez Morcillo and Abril García, C‑169/14, EU:C:2014:2099, paragraph 22).

49. With regard to the enforcement of guarantees attached to loan agreements concluded by consumers, it is clear that Directive 93/13 is silent as to enforcement of charges.

[...]

61. Secondly, as stated in paragraphs 31 and 32 of the present judgment, it appears that Law No 106/2014 Z.z. of 1 April 2014, which entered into force on 1 June 2014 and is applicable to all charge agreements in the process of being enforced as of that date, amended the procedural rules applicable to a term such as that at issue in the main proceedings. In particular, Paragraph 21(2) of the Law on Voluntary Sale by Auction, in the version in force, allows the court, where the validity of the term providing for the charge is challenged, to declare the sale void, which, retrospectively, places the consumer in a situation almost identical to his original situation and does not therefore limit the compensation for the harm caused to him, where the sale is unlawful, to mere monetary compensation.

62. With regard to the proportionality of the penalty, it is necessary to give particular attention to the fact that the property at which the procedure for the extrajudicial enforcement of the charge at issue in the main proceedings is directed is the immovable property forming the consumer's family home.

63. The loss of a family home is not only such as to seriously undermine consumer rights (the judgment in Aziz, EU:C:2013:164, paragraph 61), but it also places the family of the consumer concerned in a particularly vulnerable position (see, to that effect, the Order of the President of the Court in Sánchez Morcillo and Abril García, EU:C:2014:1388, paragraph 11).

64. In that regard, the European Court of Human Rights has held, first, that the loss of a home is one of the most serious breaches of the right to respect for the home and, secondly, that any person who risks being the victim of such a breach should be able to have the proportionality of such a measure reviewed (see the judgments of the European Court of Human Rights in McCann v United Kingdom, application No 19009/04, paragraph 50, ECHR 2008, and Rousk v Sweden, application No 27183/04, paragraph 137).

65. Under EU law, the right to accommodation is a fundamental right guaranteed under Article 7 of the Charter that the referring court must take into consideration when implementing Directive 93/13.

66. With regard in particular to the consequences of the eviction of the consumer and his family from the accommodation forming their principal family home, the Court has already emphasised the importance, for the national court, to provide for interim measures by which unlawful mortgage enforcement proceedings may be suspended or terminated where the grant of such measures proves necessary in order to ensure the effectiveness of the protection intended by Directive 93/13 (see, to that effect, the judgment in Aziz, EU:C:2013:164, paragraph 59).

67. In the present case, the fact that it is possible for the competent national court to adopt any interim measure, such as that described in paragraph 60 of the present judgment, would suggest that adequate and effective means exist to prevent the continued use of unfair terms, which is a matter for the referring court to determine.

68. It follows from the foregoing considerations that Directive 93/13 must be interpreted as not precluding national legislation, such as that at issue in the main proceedings, which allows the recovery of a debt that is based on potentially unfair contractual terms by the extrajudicial enforcement of a charge on immovable property provided as security by the consumer, in so far as that legislation does not make it excessively difficult or impossible in practice to protect the rights conferred on consumers by that directive, which is a matter for the national court to determine.

== See also ==
- EU law
- English contract law
