= Mock Auctions Act 1961 =

Act of the Parliament of the United Kingdom

Mock Auctions Act 1961 (Note: Section 4(1).)
- Act of Parliament
- Parliament of the United Kingdom
- Long title: An Act to prohibit certain practices in relation to sales purporting to be sales by auction.
- Citation: 9 & 10 Eliz. 2. c. 47
- Territorial extent: England and Wales; Scotland; (Note: Section 4(3).)

Dates
- Royal assent: 27 July 1961
- Commencement: 27 August 1961 (Note: Section 4(2).)
- Repealed: 26 May 2008
Other legislation
Repealed by	Consumer Protection from Unfair Trading Regulations 2008

Status: Repealed

Text of statute as originally enacted

The Mock Auctions Act 1961 (9 & 10 Eliz. 2. c. 47) was an act of the Parliament of the United Kingdom that regulated mock auctions. It was repealed by the Consumer Protection from Unfair Trading Regulations 2008 (SI 2008/1277).

== Background ==
Attempts to pass an act regulating mock auctions started in 1928, with the Mock Auctions Bill introduced by Lord Gorell. The bill failed after it was passed to a select committee, which reported that existing provisions were sufficient to deal with the problem. Opponents of the bill argued that it would be impossible to secure convictions, since victims are reluctant to come forward and highlight their gullibility. The second Mock Auctions Bill was introduced to Parliament by a group of MPs including Norman Dodds, and received royal assent on 27 July 1961.

== Provisions ==
To avoid interfering with genuine auctions, the act included a complex and detailed definition of a mock auction. A mock auction was an auction featuring competitive bidding which satisfied one of three tests:

1. if there is a reduction in price or repayment of the money to the highest bidder,
2. if the right to bid is restricted to people who have bought other items or
3. if any items are offered as gifts or given away.

The punishment for running a mock auction, if convicted, was at most either a £1,000 fine, two years in prison or both.

== Subsequent developments ==
The whole act was repealed by regulation 30(3) of, and part 1 of schedule 4 to, the Consumer Protection from Unfair Trading Regulations 2008 (SI 2008/1277), which came into force on 26 May 2008.

== Bibliography ==
- Downey, B.W.M. (1962). "Mock Auctions Act, 1961". Modern Law Review. 25 (3). Blackwell Publishing. ISSN 0026-7961.
