= Fraudulent Mediums Act 1951 =

Act of the Parliament of the United Kingdom

Fraudulent Mediums Act 1951 (Note: Section 3(1).)
- Act of Parliament
- Parliament of the United Kingdom
- Long title: An Act to repeal the Witchcraft Act, 1735, and to make, in substitution for certain provisions of section four of the Vagrancy Act, 1824, express provision for the punishment of persons who fraudulently purport to act as, spiritualistic mediums or to exercise powers of telepathy, clairvoyance or other similar powers.
- Citation: 14 & 15 Geo. 6. c. 33
- Introduced by: Walter Monslow (Private Members Bill) (Commons)
- Territorial extent: England and Wales; Scotland; (Note: Section 3(2).)

Dates
- Royal assent: 22 June 1951
- Commencement: 22 June 1951 (Note: The Acts of Parliament (Commencement) Act 1793.)
- Repealed: 26 May 2008
Other legislation
Repeals/revokes	Witchcraft Act 1735
Amended by	Statute Law (Repeals) Act 1993
Repealed by	Consumer Protection from Unfair Trading Regulations 2008

Status: Repealed

Text of statute as originally enacted

Revised text of statute as amended

The Fraudulent Mediums Act 1951 (14 & 15 Geo. 6. c. 33) was an act of the Parliament of the United Kingdom which prohibited a person in England and Wales from claiming to be a psychic, medium, or other spiritualist while attempting to deceive and to make money from the deception (other than solely for the purpose of entertainment). It repealed the Witchcraft Act 1735 (9 Geo. 2. c. 5), and it was in turn repealed on 26 May 2008 by Schedule 4 of the Consumer Protection from Unfair Trading Regulations 2008 implementing the EU Unfair Commercial Practices Directive 2005 which targeted unfair sales and marketing practices. It also changed section four of the Vagrancy Act 1824 (5 Geo. 4. c. 83) to ensure that it is still enforced with the acts.

There were five prosecutions under the act between 1980 and 1995, all resulting in conviction.

== Subsequent developments ==
Section 2 of the act was repealed by section 1(1) of, and group X of part Y of schedule 1 to, the Statute Law (Repeals) Act 1993, which came into force on 5 November 1993.
