= RWE Vertrieb AG v Verbraucherzentrale Nordrhein-Westfalen eV =

EU law and consumer protection case

RWE AG v Verbraucherzentrale NRW eV
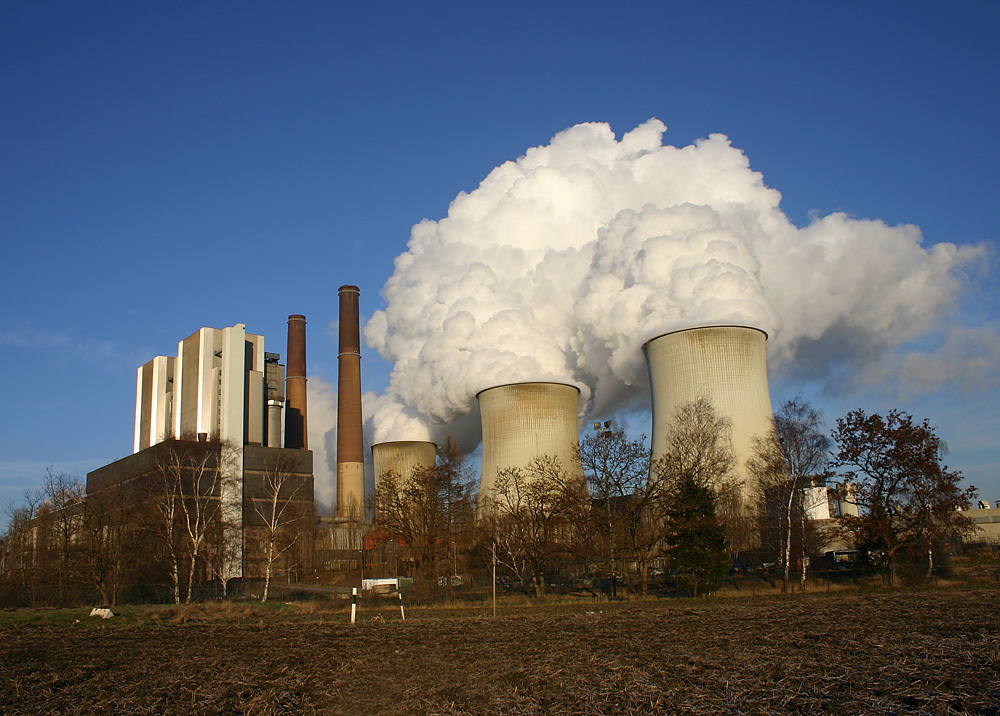
- Court: European Court of Justice
- Citation: (2013) C-92/11, [2013] 3 CMLR 10

Keywords
- Consumer protection, unfair contract terms

RWE Vertrieb AG v Verbraucherzentrale Nordrhein-Westfalen eV (2013) C-92/11 is an EU law and consumer protection case, concerning the Unfair Terms in Consumer Contracts Directive. It emphasises the foundations of consumer protection on inequality of bargaining power and imbalances in information.

== Facts ==
RWE Vertrieb AG supplied natural gas in 'special' contracts, and 'standard' contracts to consumers. The tariffs were partly set by national law. Tariff changes were regulated for 'standard' contracts, but not special contracts. The gas company could vary prices unilaterally without stating reasons, conditions or the scope of variation. The legislation merely required consumers were informed of the variation, and allowed them to terminate if they did not accept. RWE increased gas prices four times between July 2003 and October 2005, and customers in fact had no possibility to change gas supplier. The Verbraucherzentrale NRW eV (the Consumer Centre for North Rhine-Westphalia) claimed a reimbursement for the price increases.

== Judgment ==
=== Bundesgerichtshof ===
The German Bundesgerichtshof allowed the claim, and RWE's appeals were unsuccessful. RWE asked for the ECJ to determine (1) whether Directive 93/13 art 1(2), which precludes application to mandatory or statutory regulatory provisions, meant there could be no application to general terms and conditions in contracts which reproduced a national law. It also asked if (2) national law was precluded by art 3 (non-individually negotiated terms are unfair if imbalanced and lacking good faith) and art 5 (terms must be in plain, intelligible language), in conjunction with Annex A, point 1(j) and 2(b), and art 3(3) of Directive 2003/55.

The German government argued there would be serious financial consequences for German gas supply contracts.

=== European Court of Justice ===
The ECJ held that the system of consumer protection was based on the idea that the consumer was in a weaker position. The German legislature had deliberately decided to not apply national law to special contracts. The financial consequences for gas suppliers could not be deduced simply by how the law might be interpreted.

41. To answer the question, it must first be recalled that the system of protection established by Directive 93/13 is based on the idea that the consumer is in a weak position vis-à-vis the seller or supplier as regards both his bargaining power and his level of knowledge, which leads to the consumer agreeing to terms drawn up in advance by the seller or supplier without being able to influence the content of those terms (Case C-453/10 Pereničová and Perenič [2012] ECR, paragraph 27, and Case C-472/10 Invitel [2012] ECR, paragraph 33).

42. In view of that weak position, Directive 93/13 prohibits, first, in Article 3(1), standard terms which, contrary to the requirement of good faith, cause a significant imbalance in the parties' rights and obligations arising under the contract, to the detriment of the consumer.

43. Directive 93/13 imposes, secondly, in Article 5, an obligation on the seller or supplier to draft terms in plain, intelligible language. The 20th recital in the preamble to Directive 93/13 specifies that the consumer must actually be given an opportunity to examine all the terms of the contract.

[...]

47. A standard term which allows such a unilateral adjustment must, however, meet the requirements of good faith, balance and transparency laid down by those directives.

48. It must be recalled that ultimately it is not for the Court but for the national court to determine in each particular case whether that is so. The jurisdiction of the Court extends to the interpretation of the provisions of those directives and to the criteria which the national court may or must apply when examining a contractual term in the light of those provisions, bearing in mind that it is for that court to determine, in the light of those criteria, whether a particular contractual term is actually unfair in the circumstances of the case (see Case C‑137/08 VB Pénzügyi Lízing [2010] ECR I‑10847, paragraph 44, and Invitel, paragraph 22).

49. As regards the assessment of a term that allows the supplier to alter unilaterally the charges for the service to be supplied, the Court has previously stated that it follows from Articles 3 and 5 of and points 1(j) and (l) and 2(b) and (d) of the annex to Directive 93/13 that it is of fundamental importance for that purpose, first, whether the contract sets out in transparent fashion the reason for and method of the variation of the charges for the service to be provided, so that the consumer can foresee, on the basis of clear, intelligible criteria, the alterations that may be made to those charges and, secondly, whether consumers have the right to terminate the contract if the charges are in fact altered (see, to that effect, Invitel, paragraphs 24, 26 and 28).

50. With respect, in the first place, to the information to be given to the consumer, it is clear that that obligation to make the consumer aware of the reason for and method of the variation of those charges and his right to terminate the contract is not satisfied by the mere reference, in the general terms and conditions, to a legislative or regulatory act determining the rights and obligations of the parties. It is essential that the consumer is informed by the seller or supplier of the content of the provisions concerned (see, to that effect, Invitel, paragraph 29).

51. While the level of information required may vary according to the particular circumstances of the case and the goods or services concerned, the lack of information on the point before the contract is concluded cannot, in principle, be compensated for by the mere fact that consumers will, during the performance of the contract, be informed in good time of a variation of the charges and of their right to terminate the contract if they do not wish to accept the variation.

52. While from the point of view of point 2(b) of the annex to Directive 93/13 and point (b) of Annex A to Directive 2003/55 it is indeed for the supply undertaking to notify consumers in good time of any increase in tariffs and of their right to terminate the contract, that obligation, laid down for cases in which the undertaking actually wishes to exercise the right reserved to it to amend the tariffs, is in addition to the obligation to inform the consumer, before conclusion of the contract and in clear and intelligible terms, of the principal conditions of the exercise of that right of unilateral variation.

53. Those strict requirements as to the information to be given to the consumer, both at the stage of the conclusion of a supply contract and during the performance of the contract, as regards the right of the supplier unilaterally to alter the terms of the contract, correspond to a balancing of the interests of the two parties. To the supplier's legitimate interest in guarding against a change of circumstances there corresponds the consumer's equally legitimate interest, first, in knowing and thus being able to foresee the consequences which such a change might in future have for him and, secondly, in having the data available in such a case to allow him to react most appropriately to his new situation.

54. With respect, in the second place, to the consumer's right to terminate the supply contract he has concluded in the event of a unilateral alteration of the tariffs applied by the supplier, it is of fundamental importance, as the Advocate General says in substance in point 85 of her Opinion, that the right of termination given to the consumer is not purely formal but can actually be exercised. That would not be the case if, for reasons connected with the method of exercise of the right of termination or the conditions of the market concerned, the consumer has no real possibility of changing supplier, or if he has not been informed suitably in good time of the forthcoming change, thus depriving him of the possibility of checking how it is calculated and, if appropriate, of changing supplier. Account must be taken in particular of whether the market concerned is competitive, the possible cost to the consumer of terminating the contract, the time between the notification and the coming into force of the new tariffs, the information provided at the time of that communication, and the cost to be borne and the time taken to change supplier.

== See also ==
- EU law
