= Helen Ewing Nelson =

Helen Ewing Nelson (October 19, 1913 – March 22, 2005) was a consumer protection advocate in the United States. She drafted the Consumer Bill of Rights and served in consumer advocacy positions for various government offices and other organizations.

== Early life ==
Nelson studied economics at the University of Colorado and at Mills College in San Francisco. In 1938 she was worked at the California Department of Employment where she met her husband, Nathan Nelson. During World War II they moved to Washington D.C. for his military duty, so she took a job there at the War Production Board. After the war they returned to San Francisco.

== Consumer advocacy ==
Nelson became assistant chief of the Labor Statistics Division of the California Department of Industrial Relations. In 1959 California Governor Pat Brown asked Nelson to be on the board of the California Consumer Counsel which he promised to create during his election campaign. In this position she set up infrastructure for such groups as the NAACP, labor unions, and women's rights groups to be able to lobby their representatives in government. During this time she also drafted what was to become the Consumer Bill of Rights after it was presented by President John F. Kennedy. She also took Kennedy's appointment to the presidential Consumer Advisory Council, and kept that position through the presidency of Lyndon B. Johnson.

In 1967 at the start of the governorship of Ronald Reagan one of Reagan's first actions was to fire Nelson from her state government post at the Consumer Counsel. Nelson said that this was because she was disliked by Reagan's supporters, including the California Grocer's Association and the California Manufacturers' Association. After this she became elected president of the Consumer Federation of California. She served also on the board of Consumers Union, and would be re-elected for a total of five three-year terms on that board. From 1969-1979 served as a professor of economics at the University of Wisconsin. During this time she also served as a public governor for the American Stock Exchange. In 1968 after 15 years of work her lobbying had contributed to the passing of the Truth in Lending Act. She served two terms as president of the Consumer Federation of America from 1972-1982. She was the consumer consultant to the Office of Technology Assessment and the National Academy of Sciences. She petitioned the National Academy of Science to recognize the research showing saccharin as a cancer-causing agent and fluorocarbons as causing ozone depletion. In 1978 President Jimmy Carter appointed Nelson to the President's Export Council. Also in 1978 the American Council on Consumer Interests recognized her as a "Distinguished Fellow". In 1979 after the 1977 death of her husband Nelson returned to Mill Valley, California. There she was appointed to the Consumer Advisory Council of the Federal Reserve Board of Governors, the consumer advisory panel for Pacific Bell, and the San Francisco chapter of Consumer Action. At this time she said that her worst fear for the future was "That consumers will become like the feudal people of old times. That they will be so tied to a VISA card that they are not whole people. That they will be easily manipulated by the television and sellers, that they will do what is suggested to them instead of what comes from their own spirit."

== Selected works ==
- Nelson, Helen (1977). A Guide to Consumer Action. U.S. Department of Health, Education, and Welfare.
- Change Makers: The Struggle for Consumer Rights - a documentary on the consumer movement with special attention given to the Consumer Bill of Rights
- Nelson, H. Y.; Jacoby, G. P.; Shannon, T. M. (1978). "Evaluation of Homemaking and Consumer Education Programs for Low-Income Adults". Home Economics Research Journal. 6 (3): 223. doi:10.1177/1077727X7800600305.
