= Late Payment of Commercial Debts (Interest) Act 1998 =

Act of the Parliament of the United Kingdom

Late Payment of Commercial Debts (Interest) Act 1998 (Note: Section 17(1).)
- Act of Parliament
- Parliament of the United Kingdom
- Long title: An Act to make provision with respect to interest on the late payment of certain debts arising under commercial contracts for the supply of goods or services; and for connected purposes.
- Citation: 1998 c. 20
- Territorial extent: United Kingdom (Note: Section 17(5).)

Dates
- Royal assent: 11 June 1998
- Commencement: 1 November 1998 (specified provisions); 1 July 1999 (specified provisions); 1 September 2000 (specified provisions); 1 November 2000 (specified provisions); 7 August 2002 (remaining provisions); (Note: Section 17(2). The Late Payment of Commercial Debts (Interest) Act 1998 (Commencement No. 1) Order 1998 (SI 1998/2479), the Late Payment of Commercial Debts (Interest) Act 1998 (Commencement No. 2) Order 1999 (SI 1999/1816), the Late Payment of Commercial Debts (Interest) Act 1998 (Commencement No. 3) Order 2000 (SI 2000/2225), the Late Payment of Commercial Debts (Interest) Act 1998 (Commencement No. 4) Order 2000 (SI 2000/2740), the Late Payment of Commercial Debts (Interest) Act 1998 (Commencement No. 5) Order 2002 (SI 2002/1673) and the Late Payment of Commercial Debts (Interest) Act 1998 (Commencement No. 6) (Scotland) Order 2002 (SSI 2002/337).)
Other legislation
Amended by	Scotland Act 1998 (Consequential Modifications) (No.2) Order 1999; Late Payment of Commercial Debts (Scotland) Regulations 2002; Late Payment of Commercial Debts Regulations 2002; Late Payment of Commercial Debts (Scotland) Regulations 2013; Late Payment of Commercial Debts (Scotland) (No. 2) Regulations 2013; Late Payment of Commercial Debts Regulations 2013; Late Payment of Commercial Debts (No.2) Regulations 2013; Public Contracts Regulations 2015; Late Payment of Commercial Debts (Scotland) Regulations 2015; Public Contracts (Scotland) Regulations 2015; Late Payment of Commercial Debts (Amendment) Regulations 2015; Procurement Act 2023 (Consequential and Other Amendments) Regulations 2025

Status: Amended

Text of statute as originally enacted

Revised text of statute as amended

The Late Payment of Commercial Debts (Interest) Act 1998 (c. 20) is an act of the Parliament of the United Kingdom enabling businesses to charge other business customers interest on overdue accounts and to obtain compensation. The act extends to England and Wales, Scotland and Northern Ireland.

Originally, it was only designed to give small businesses (with 50 or fewer employees) the right to charge interest to larger businesses and public sector organisations of any size.

== Provisions ==
The act has 17 sections in three parts: Part I (sections 1 to 6) on statutory interest on qualifying debts, Part II (sections 7 to 10) on contract terms relating to late payment of qualifying debts, and Part III (sections 11 to 17) on general and supplementary matters. The act and the regulations made under it provide all businesses and the public sector with certain rights, including the right to claim interest when there is late payment, the right to claim reasonable costs of debt recovery, the right to challenge terms in a contract, and the right of "representative bodies" to challenge unfair terms in a contract.

=== Statutory interest ===
Section 1 implies a term in a contract to which the act applies that any qualifying debt created by the contract carries simple interest. The right to charge interest applies to overdue accounts relating to a sale of goods, the hiring of goods or to a supply of services, where the purchaser and the supplier are each acting in the course of a business, a term which includes a profession and the activities of any government department or local or public authority. It does not apply to a consumer credit agreement or to a contract intended to operate by way of mortgage, pledge, charge or other security (section 2). The court can modify or exclude the provisions if the conduct of the supplier has been such as to make the imposition of interest, in whole or in part, against the interests of justice (section 5).

Statutory interest starts to run on the day after the "relevant day" for the debt. Where the supplier and the purchaser have agreed a date for payment, that is the relevant day. That is subject to two limits: where the purchaser is a public authority, the relevant day is no later than the end of the period of 30 days beginning with the later of the day on which the supplier performed its obligation and the day on which the purchaser had notice of the amount of the debt; and where the purchaser is not a public authority, the limit is 60 days, unless the agreed date is not grossly unfair to the supplier. Where no date has been agreed, the relevant day is the last day of the 30-day period. The period is extended where there is a procedure of acceptance or verification under which the conformity of the goods or services with the contract is to be ascertained (section 4).

The "statutory interest" rate chargeable, which is simple and not compound, is the Bank of England base rate plus 8%. The increment was set to allow the small business to cover late payments by bank borrowings. The rate is set under section 6 by order of the Secretary of State, made with the consent of the Treasury, and is currently 8 per cent per annum over the official dealing rate in force on the preceding 30 June or 31 December, under the Late Payment of Commercial Debts (Rate of Interest) (No. 3) Order 2002.

=== Compensation chargeable ===
Once statutory interest begins to run in relation to a qualifying debt, the supplier is also entitled to a fixed sum (section 5A):

(a) for a debt less than £1000, the sum of £40;

(b) for a debt of £1000 or more, but less than £10,000, the sum of £70;

(c) for a debt of £10,000 or more, the sum of £100.

If the reasonable costs of the supplier in recovering the debt are not met by the fixed sum, the supplier is also entitled to a sum equivalent to the difference.

=== Ousting the statutory interest ===
It is possible contractually to oust the statutory interest requirements, and hence of the compensation provisions, where the contract provides a substantial remedy for late payment, sufficient either for the purpose of compensating the supplier for late payment or for deterring late payment (section 8). Section 9 provides that a remedy is regarded as substantial unless it is insufficient for those purposes and it would not be fair or reasonable to allow it to be relied on, and lists the matters to be considered, including commercial certainty, the relative bargaining positions of the parties, whether the term was imposed by one party to the detriment of the other, and whether the supplier received an inducement to agree to it. The meaning of "substantial remedy" will depend on circumstances and as developed in case law. Suppliers can be expected in time to delete other remedies (except against non-business buyers) and rely exclusively on the act's generous provisions. Apart from this, the parties cannot contract out of the act's provisions.

=== Part III ===
Section 11 deals with when a debt for an advance payment is treated as created, section 12 with the conflict of laws, and section 13 with assignments of the right to be paid or the duty to pay. Section 14 applies section 3(2)(b) and section 17(1)(b) of the Unfair Contract Terms Act 1977 to contract terms which postpone the time at which a qualifying debt would otherwise be created, whether or not the term is contained in written standard terms of the purchaser. Section 15 provides for orders and regulations to be made by statutory instrument, subject to annulment, and section 16 for interpretation. Section 17 provides the short title, allows the act to be brought into force by order on different days for different descriptions of contract, and extends it to Northern Ireland.

== Commencement ==
Section 17(2) allowed the Secretary of State to bring the act into force by order on different days for different descriptions of contract, and section 17(4) provided that the act does not affect contracts made before it came into force for contracts of that description. It was brought into force in six stages, each applying only to contracts made on or after the date in question:

- 1 November 1998, for contracts between a small business supplier and either a large business purchaser or a specified United Kingdom public authority;
- 1 July 1999, for contracts between a small business supplier and any of a further list of public authorities;
- 1 September 2000, for contracts between a small business supplier and a further list of public bodies;
- 1 November 2000, for contracts between a small business supplier and a small business purchaser; and
- 7 August 2002, for all remaining contracts, by one order for England and Wales and Northern Ireland and another for Scotland.

For these purposes a business was a small business if it employed 50 or fewer full-time employees.

== Other legislation ==
The Reporting on Payment Practices and Performance Regulations 2017 came into force on 6 April 2017. Under the rules introduced in April 2017, all large UK companies are required to publish specific information regarding their payment policies, practices and performance — including the average time taken to pay supplier invoices — twice yearly. This information is made public in a report.

These regulations have subsequently been amended by:

- The Reporting on Payment Practices and Performance (Amendment) Regulations 2024.
- The Reporting on Payment Practices and Performance (Amendment) Regulations 2025, which established new rules effective from 1 April 2025 for companies covered by the reporting requirement who use certain construction contracts.

== Subsequent developments ==
The Scotland Act 1998 (Consequential Modifications) (No.2) Order 1999 (SI 1999/1820) added a definition of "government department" to section 2(7), including any part of the Scottish Administration, with effect from 1 July 1999.

The Late Payment of Commercial Debts Regulations 2002 (SI 2002/1674) came into effect on 7 August 2002 and implemented Directive 2000/35/EC on combating late payment in commercial transactions. They repealed the Secretary of State's powers to except contracts and debts from the act (section 2(5)(c) and (6) and section 3(4) and (5)), inserted section 5A giving the supplier a fixed sum by way of compensation, and, by regulation 3, allowed a representative body to bring proceedings in the High Court on behalf of small and medium-sized enterprises against standard terms which purport to oust or vary the right to statutory interest. The Late Payment of Commercial Debts (Scotland) Regulations 2002 (SSI 2002/335) made equivalent amendments for Scotland, and also inserted section 2A, which applies the act to fees paid for professional services to a member of the Faculty of Advocates.

The Late Payment of Commercial Debts Regulations 2013 (SI 2013/395), with effect from 16 March 2013 in England and Wales and Northern Ireland, and the equivalent Scottish regulations (SSI 2013/77), with effect from 29 March 2013 in Scotland, inserted further provisions in section 4 on when interest starts to run, and added section 5A(2A), the right of the supplier to recover reasonable costs of recovery in excess of the fixed sum. The Late Payment of Commercial Debts (Amendment) Regulations 2015 (SI 2015/1336), with effect from 21 June 2015 in England and Wales and Northern Ireland, and the Late Payment of Commercial Debts (Scotland) Regulations 2015 (SSI 2015/226), with effect from 27 June 2015 in Scotland, inserted section 4(2A) to (2I) and omitted section 4(3) to (5), restating the rules on the relevant day for a debt. The definition of "public authority" in section 4(8) was substituted by the Procurement Act 2023 (Consequential and Other Amendments) Regulations 2025 (SI 2025/163), with effect from 24 February 2025.

== See also ==
- Late Payments Directive
