= Unfair Commercial Practices Directive 2005 =

EU consumer law regulation

Directive 2005/29/EC
- European Union directive
- Title: Directive of the European Parliament and of the Council concerning unfair business-to-consumer commercial practices in the internal market (‘Unfair Commercial Practices Directive’)
- Made by: European Parliament and Council
- Made under: Art. 95 TEC
- Journal reference: L149, pp. 22–39

History
- Date made: 11 May 2005
- Entry into force: 11 June 2005
- Implementation date: 12 June 2007

Other legislation
- Amends: Directive 84/450/EEC, Directive 97/7/EC, Directive 98/27/EC, Directive 2002/65/EC, and Regulation (EC) No 2006/2004

The Unfair Commercial Practices Directive 2005/29/EC regulates unfair business practices in EU law, as part of European consumer law. It requires corresponding laws to be passed that incorporate it into each member state's legal system. It is intended to provide "a high level of consumer protection" and a level playing field in the single market, reducing trade barriers.

The Directive is concerned mainly with the "substantive" law (meaning in this context the standards of behaviour required of traders). To some extent, it leaves to member states the choice of appropriate domestic enforcement procedures and penalties for non-compliance (Articles 11 to 13 of the Directive).

In July 2025, following its “digital fairness” fitness check of EU consumer law, the European Commission launched a public consultation on a proposed Digital Fairness Act to address manipulative online practices and modernise the EU consumer-law framework. The initiative is expected to update elements of the Unfair Commercial Practices Directive (alongside other consumer directives).

== Contents ==
=== Recitals ===
The recitals state that the objective of the Directive to reduce barriers to free trade in the EU while simultaneously ensuring "a high level of consumer protection". At issue was that the consumer protection laws are different among the various member states (see Article 1 of the Directive and the recitals to it). The Directive is supposed to reduce these differences while establishing a required level of consumer protection across all member states. This is expected to benefit both business and consumers, as businesses receive a more standardised legal system under which to operate and consumers receive a sufficient and standardised level of protection, regardless of where they choose to make purchases.

The Directive is designed to achieve so-called maximum harmonisation of business-to-consumer fair trade. Maximum harmonisation requires member states of the European Union to apply the standards set out in European legislation, and prohibits those states from applying lower or higher standards. In other words, the Directive tells European countries to give consumers no more and no less than the level of protection set out in the Directive. That maximum harmonisation is not yet in force.

=== Chapter 1 ===
The Directive starts with a general prohibition on unfair business-to-consumer commercial practices (Articles 3(1) and 5(1)) and then goes into progressively greater detail defining what that means.

Article 3(2) states the Directive is expressly "without prejudice to contract law and, in particular, to the rules on the validity, formation or effect of a contract" (see also the 9th recital to the Directive). It does not seek to harmonise unfair competition law regulating "...commercial practices which, although not harming consumers, may hurt competitors and business customers" (8th recital to the Directive).

=== Chapter 2 ===
Article 5(1) says that "unfair commercial practices" are prohibited, and under article 5(2)(a) these are practices that are "contrary to the requirements of professional diligence" (see further Article 2(h)) and that are likely to materially distort the economic behaviour of the average consumer (Article 5(2)(b)). The effect of commercial practices on particular kinds of consumers, especially those who are unusually vulnerable, can replace the "average consumer" test if the practices are directed at those kinds of consumers or will foreseeably affect them (Articles 5(2)(b) and 5(3)). Digital policy analyst James Tamim argued that, under the Directive’s general prohibition on unfair commercial practices (Articles 5(2)(b) and 5(3)), an AI chatbot that exploits a consumer’s emotional vulnerability or loneliness to induce continued paid use could be considered an unfair practice. The Directive describes two major categories of unfair commercial practices:- those that are misleading (Articles 5(4)(a), 6 and 7) and those that are aggressive (Articles 5(4)(b), 8 and 9). Annex 1 to the Directive sets out a list of "commercial practices that are, in all circumstances, considered unfair" (a black-list of bad behaviour). These are divided into "misleading commercial practices" (23 examples) and "aggressive commercial practices" (8 examples).

On a literal reading of the Directive, misleading or aggressive commercial practices that would not affect the average consumer's economic behaviour, but would distort the economic behaviour of particular kinds of consumer, may be prohibited only by the general clause in Articles 5(1) to 5(3), and not by the specific clauses in Articles 6 to 9. This is because the latter provisions refer exclusively to the "average consumer" (although Article 9(c) also refers to the "exploitation of any specific misfortune or circumstance of such gravity as to impair the consumer's judgement, of which the trader is aware..."). However, it might be fairer to read Articles 5(2)(b) and 5(3) as supplanting the references to the "average consumer" in Articles 6 to 9 in appropriate cases. The UK Government's Department of Trade and Industry published a consultation paper in December 2005, which suggested that that was indeed the intention. There is no clear basis in the text for the favoured interpretation, but the UK Government supports its interpretation with reference to the European Commission's Explanatory Memorandum. This could be important because depending on the answer to this question it may be easier or harder to pin down a breach of the Directive.

The rules referred to in the actual text of the Directive in relation to codes of conduct are quite limited (e.g. Article 6(2)(b), prohibiting non-compliance with codes of conduct in some circumstances, and Article 10). However, the 20th recital states: "It is appropriate to provide a role for codes of conduct ... In sectors where there are specific mandatory requirements ... these will also provide evidence as to the requirements of professional diligence in that sector. ... consumers' organisations could be informed and involved in the drafting of codes of conduct." Subscribers to a code of conduct drafted with the input of and endorsed by a major consumers' organisation could seek to argue during enforcement proceedings that compliance with the code of conduct is therefore evidence that they have not engaged in unfair commercial practices. Those charged with promoting and administering membership of codes of conduct will take note that Article 11(1) in effect contemplates the possibility of class-actions brought by consumer groups against code-owners where the code promotes non-compliance with legal requirements. Taken together, these provisions may be an incentive for those who administer and promote codes of conduct to consult with consumers' groups and take careful legal advice in relation to the drafting of such codes.

=== Chapters 3 and 4 ===
Chapter 3 envisages a role for businesses in the industry to draft codes of conduct about practices among their competitors.

Chapter 4 requires that member states have, under article 11, "adequate and effective means exist to combat unfair commercial practices". This includes ensuring that consumer groups have standing to take representative legal action on behalf of the people whose interests they represent, or make complaints to the consumer authorities. Article 11(2) requires that public authorities exist (for instance, the Competition and Markets Authority or the Bundesamt für Verbraucherschutz und Lebensmittelsicherheit). Article 11(3) requires that they should be impartial in fulfilling their role of protecting consumers against unfair business practices.

== Implementation ==
The Directive required the member states to pass laws by no later than 12 June 2007 incorporating it into their own internal national law by 12 December 2007. However, until at least 12 June 2013, Member States will continue to be able to apply more protective national rules diverging from European directives insofar as it is necessary and proportionate to do so (Article 3(5)), meaning that maximum harmonisation may not be complete before that date. There will be a major review of the operation of the Directive by 12 June 2011 (Article 18).

== See also ==
- Unfair Terms in Consumer Contracts Directive
- Product Liability Directive
- English contract law
- National Recovery Administration and Louis Brandeis
- Digital Fairness Act
