= United Nations Guidelines for Consumer Protection =

The United Nations Guidelines for Consumer Protection (UNGCP) relate to consumer protection goals. The statement supplied is that the guidelines are "a valuable set of principles for setting out the main characteristics of effective consumer protection legislation, enforcement institutions and redress systems and for assisting interested Member States in formulating and enforcing domestic and regional laws, rules and regulations that are suitable to their own economic and social and environmental circumstances, as well as promoting international enforcement cooperation among Member States and encouraging the sharing of experiences in consumer protection."

They were first adopted by the General Assembly in resolution 39/248 of 16 April 1985, later expanded by the Economic and Social Council (ECOSOC) in resolution E/1999/INF/2/Add.2 of 26 July 1999, and recently revised by the General Assembly in resolution 70/186 of 22 December 2015.

The Intergovernmental group of experts on consumer protection law and policy has been established to monitor the implementation of the guidelines, provide a forum for consultations, produce research and studies, provide technical assistance, undertake voluntary peer reviews, and periodically update the UNGCP. Its first meeting took place on 17 and 18 October 2016 in Geneva under the auspices of the United Nations Conference on Trade and Development (UNCTAD)

== History ==
The UNGCP were adopted by consensus in 1985. This followed a long campaign by consumer associations in many countries, with Consumers International (then known as the International Organisation of Consumer Unions since its establishment in 1960 and granted general consultative status by the Economic & Social Committee in 1977) acting as interlocutor with the United Nations, having called upon the United Nations to prepare a ‘Model Code for consumer protection’ at its World congress in Sydney in 1975. This led, in 1977, to ECOSOC directing the Secretary-General to prepare a survey of national institutions and legislation in the area of consumer protection and in 1981, ECOSOC requested the SG ‘to continue consultations on consumer protection with a view to elaborating a set of general guidelines for consumer protection, taking particularly into account the needs of the developing countries’. Draft guidelines were circulated to governments for comments in 1982, submitted to ECOSOC in 1983, drawing on many sources including the OECD, the US Consumer Bill of Rights and materials from national consumer protection agencies and consumer associations.

In 1999, the UNGCP were expanded significantly to include a new section on sustainable consumption (Section H of the 2015 version).

In July 2012, the First Ad Hoc Expert Meeting on Consumer Protection decided that UNCTAD should begin a consultation process on the revision UNGCP. As a result of this consultation and call for contributions, the UNCTAD secretariat produced the Implementation Report on the United Nations Guidelines for Consumer Protection (1985 - 2013).

The Second Ad Hoc Expert Meeting on Consumer Protection, held in July 2013 under the French Presidency, discussed the Implementation Report and its conclusions, and proposed the creation of four Working Groups (on e-commerce, financial services, other issues and implementation) that would feed into the UNCTAD Secretariat report, Modalities for the Revision of the UNGCP, to be submitted to the VII UN Review Conference to Review all Aspect of the Set of Multilaterally Agreed Equitable Principles and Rules for the Control of Restrictive Business Practices.

In July 2013, the Third Ad Hoc Expert Meeting on Consumer Protection, discussed the Modalities Report and its conclusions, plus further issues that were highlighted by member States and stakeholders as candidates for a proposed inclusion in the revision of the UNGCP. A text was negotiated among consumer protection experts and diplomatic missions in Geneva between January and June 2015.

The Seventh United Nations Conference to Review All Aspects of the Set of Multilaterally Agreed Equitable Principles and Rules for the Control of Restrictive Business Practices, which was held in Geneva from 6 to 10 July 2015, adopted by unanimity the Draft Resolution on consumer protection and the revised UNGCP and invited "the General Assembly of the United Nations, at its seventieth Session in 2015, to consider the adoption of the Draft Resolution on Consumer Protection and the revised United Nations Guidelines on Consumer Protection as annexed to this resolution."

The General Assembly adopted the resolution on consumer protection and the annexed UNGCP on 22 December 2015.

== Content of the revised UNGCP ==
The 2015 revised UNGCP are preceded by the General Assembly resolution on consumer protection 70/186, which makes specific reference to the needs of developing countries, to the setting of the Sustainable Development Goals as the successors to the Millennium Development Goals, and the need for governments to cooperate across borders. References to changes since 1999 are implied by paragraphs on privacy, e-commerce and financial services, with explicit reference to the financial crisis. The latter two developments are the focus of new sections in the Guidelines. The Intergovernmental group of experts on consumer protection law and policy is expected to continue within the framework of existing UNCTAD machinery alongside continued review of the ‘UN Set on competition.'

The new UNGCP extend their scope to state-owned enterprises (GL2) and introduce four new ‘legitimate needs’ into Guideline 5, the most quoted passage of the UNGCP. Completely new sections are inserted on Principles for Good Business Practices (GL 11) and National Policies for consumer protection (GLs 14–15), electronic commerce (GLs 63–65), and financial services (GLs 66–68). The previous section E, on Measures enabling consumers to obtain redress, is renamed Dispute resolution & redress (now section F) and expanded to reflect the rapid evolution of such mechanisms and now includes reference to debt and bankruptcy. The Specific Areas section (now K) is expanded to include Energy, (GL76), Public utilities (GL77) and Tourism (GL78). Finally section VI, on International cooperation, has been significantly expanded by the additions of Guidelines 82–90, largely covering enforcement mechanisms at international level. The new section VII, International Institutional Machinery, addresses the review of the application and implementation of the UNGCP at national levels and the further review of the Guidelines themselves.

== The Intergovernmental group of experts on consumer protection law and policy ==
The 2015 revision (see section VII, paras 95–99) sets up institutional mechanisms for monitoring compliance with the UNGCP, under the supervision of the Intergovernmental Group of Experts on Consumer Protection Law and Policy, which is to be held under the auspices of UNCTAD.

The group will have the following functions: annual forum and modalities for multilateral consultation; periodic studies related to elements of the UNGCP; peer reviews of Consumer Protection policies; periodic assessment of implementation of the UNGCP; capacity building; and exchanges of information.

The first meeting of the Intergovernmental group of experts on consumer protection law and policy took place on17 and 18 October 2016 in Geneva. Since then, the group meets annually at the Palais des Nations in Geneva, Switzerland, normally in July.

== See also ==
- Consumer activism
- Consumer protection
- United Nations General Assembly
- United Nations Conference on Trade and Development
