= Mock auction =

Type of scam

A mock auction is a scam usually operated in a street market, disposal sale or similar environment, where cheap and low quality goods are sold at high prices by a team of confidence tricksters.

== History ==
In 19th century New York, mock auctions revolved around the sale of cigars, horses and high quality furniture. In Denver, confidence man Soapy Smith and his Soap Gang auctioned off shiny brass watches as being made of gold. Other items were soap and candy wrapped with cash prizes. In more recent years, the focus has been on electronic consumer goods.

== Mock auctions ==
Typically, during the sale, members of the gang operating the scam will pose as customers; they will be given boxes of high-value goods for a very low price, and will pretend to be very pleased with their bargain purchases. In reality, these goods are handed back and forth between the fake 'lucky customers' and the sellers, out of view of the real customers, after each time the con is completed. The fake auctioneer, who is usually the gang's leader, will often be a skilled, practiced orator, who will typically be able to win the confidence of a substantial proportion of his potential victims.

== Techniques ==
Commonly employed techniques include selling what appear to be boxed, high-quality branded goods, but which are actually very inferior, cheap fakes; or are rejects which have serious faults. Alternatively, the boxes may contain only blocks of wood or breezeblock or bottles of water etc. The gang will have members in the audience throughout the deployment of the scam, and will not allow customers to open any of their purchases in the shop/market. They will quickly lock up, and/or escape before any of the victims realize that they've been conned.

No-one will be given genuine receipts or guarantees, although the gang may claim these documents are within the sealed boxes. In common with many confidence tricksters, the gangs very often move from town to town, city to city etc. to reduce the risk of being caught. They have been known to use violence when a lone (prospective) victim confronts them.
