= Consumer Bill of Rights =

Guidelines for consumer protection

On March 15, 1962, President John F. Kennedy presented a speech to the United States Congress in which he extolled four basic consumer rights, later called the Consumer Bill of Rights. The United Nations through the United Nations Guidelines for Consumer Protection expanded these into eight rights, and thereafter Consumers International adopted these rights as a charter and started recognizing March 15 as World Consumer Rights Day.

== Background ==
Before the mid-twentieth century, consumers had limited rights with regard to their interaction with products and commercial producers. Consumers had limited ground on which to defend themselves against faulty or defective products, or against misleading or deceptive advertising methods.

The consumer movement began to gather a following, pushing for increased rights and legal protection against malicious business practices. By the end of the 1950s, legal product liability had been established in which an aggrieved party need only prove injury by use of a product, rather than bearing the burden of proof of corporate negligence.

Helen Ewing Nelson was a drafter of the Consumer Bill of Rights and sought an outlet for distributing it. During Kennedy's election campaign he made a promise to support consumers. After his election, Fred Dutton, a colleague of Nelson's and a government officer who advised the president, asked for Nelson's suggestions on how the president could support consumers, and she sent him the Consumer Bill of Rights. Kennedy presented those rights in a speech to Congress on March 15, 1962. In that speech he named four basic rights of consumers.

== The Original Four Rights ==
=== The Right To Safety ===
The assertion of this right is aimed at the defense of consumers against injuries caused by products other than automobile vehicles, and implies that products should cause no harm to their users if such use is executed as prescribed. The right was further formalized in 1972 by the US federal government through the Consumer Product Safety Commission (CPSC). This organization has jurisdiction over thousands of commercial products, and powers that allow it to establish performance standards and require product testing and warning labels.

=== The Right To Be Informed ===
This right states that business should always provide consumers with enough appropriate information to make intelligent and informed choices. Product and service information provided by business should always be complete, truthful and also appropriate. Aiming to achieve protection against misleading information in the areas of financing, advertising, labeling, and packaging, the right to be informed is protected by several pieces of legislation passed between 1960 and 80.

Some of the legislation which was made because of the assertion of this right include the following:

- Fair Packaging and Labeling Act (US)
- Wholesome Meat Act
- Truth in Lending Act
- Magnuson–Moss Warranty Act

=== The Right To Choose ===
The right to free choice among product and service offerings states that consumers should be assured of access to a variety of options. This includes not only options provided by different companies from which to choose, but also that the available options are truly accessible, free from deceptive and unfair practices. The federal government has taken many steps to ensure the availability of a healthy environment open to competition through legislation including limits on concept ownership through patent law, prevention of monopolistic business practices through anti-trust legislation, and the outlaw of price cutting and gouging. Under the Federal Trade Commission Act of 1914, coercion, exploitation, collusion, abuse, deception, and predation are all forms of anti-competitive conduct. These anti-competitive conducts directly influence this basic right. Notably, without disclosure of truthful information, a consumer's choice is exploited.

=== The Right To Be Heard ===
This right gives the ability to consumers to voice complaints and concerns about a product or service, and the assurance that complaints and concerns will be addressed in a fair, timely, and meaningful way. While no federal agency is tasked with the specific duty of providing a forum for this interaction between consumer and producer, certain outlets exist to aid consumers if difficulty occurs in communication with an aggrieving party. State and federal attorneys general are equipped to aid their constituents in dealing with parties who have provided a product or service in a manner unsatisfactory to the consumer in violation of an applicable law. The Federal Trade Commission accepts and reviews petitions for rulemaking from the public. Also, the Better Business Bureau is a national non-governmental organization whose sole agenda is to provide political lobbies and action on behalf of aggrieved consumers.

== Expansion To Eight Rights ==
In 1985, the concept of consumer rights was endorsed by the United Nations through the United Nations Guidelines for Consumer Protection, which expands them to include eight basic rights.

=== The Right To Satisfaction Of Basic Needs ===
This right demands that people have access to basic, essential goods and services: adequate food, clothing, shelter, health care, education, public utilities, water, etc.

=== The Right To Redress ===
The right to redress provides for consumers to receive a fair settlement of just claims, including compensation for misrepresentation, shoddy goods, or unsatisfactory services. For example, a consumer should be able to go to consumer court against mobile phone companies that put hidden charges on the bill that were not previously explained, or activate ringtones without the consumer's permission.

=== The Right To Consumer Education ===
The right to consumer education states that consumers should be able to acquire knowledge and skills needed to make informed, confident choices about goods and services while being aware of basic consumer rights and responsibilities and how to act on them.

=== The Right to a Healthy Environment ===
This is the right to live and work in a work space or home that is non-threatening to the well-being of present and future generations.

== World Consumer Rights Day ==
The NGO Consumers International adopted the eight rights and restated them as a charter. Subsequently, the organization began recognizing the date of Kennedy's speech, March 15, as World Consumer Rights Day.

== United Kingdom provisions ==
As of May 2014, the UK Government has introduced proposed legislation before Parliament. The bill is the "Consumer Rights Bill", and it will consolidate and develop Unfair Contract Terms provisions and Consumer Protection provisions.

== Sources ==
- "Consumer Bill of Rights Business Study Guide" from bookrags.com (24 June 2006).
