= Aziz v Caixa d'Estalvis de Catalunya =

2013 European Court of Justice case

- Court: European Court of Justice
- Full case name: Aziz v Caixa d'Estalvis de Catalunya, Tarragona i Manresa (Catalunyacaixa)
- Citation: (2013) Case C-415/11, [2013] 3 CMLR 5

Keywords
- Consumer protection, unfair contract terms

Aziz v Caixa d'Estalvis de Catalunya (2013) Case C-415/11 is an EU law and consumer protection case, concerning the Unfair Terms in Consumer Contracts Directive. It emphasises the foundations of consumer protection on inequality of bargaining power and imbalances in information.

== Facts ==
Mohammed Aziz was a resident in Spain. He took out a mortgage with Caixa d'Estalvis de Catalunya (the Savings Bank of Catalonia), secured on his home at an annual default interest rate of 18.75%. The Caixa was entitled to call in the loan upon a default by Aziz. Clause 15 of the contract also purported to give the right to reclaim any debt, quantifiable immediately. Aziz did default, and the Caixa quantified the debt through a notary, adding contractual and default interest. The bank began repossession of the property and a week before eviction, Aziz applied to the Spanish court to annul clause 15 on grounds of unfairness under the Unfair Terms in Consumer Contracts Directive. No provision in Spanish law foresaw this possibility, nor was there any interim relief. Under Spanish law, final vesting of the mortgaged property was irreversible even if a term was challenged as unfair before the court. The only exception was where a consumer made preliminary registration for the application to be annulled before a marginal note regarding a security certificate.

== Judgment ==
=== Spanish courts ===
The Spanish Court asked the European Court of Justice (1) whether national law was compatible with the Unfair Contract Terms Directive 93/13/EC, (2) what the concept of 'unfair term' in articles 3(1) and (3) meant, to assess the fairness of terms relating to acceleration in long terms contracts, in setting default interest rates and quantification. The Caixa said this was inadmissible, as being irrelevant to the dispute, because it related to declaratory rather than enforcement proceedings.

=== European Court of Justice ===
The Court of Justice, First Chamber, held that the terms were capable of being assessed for fairness.

== See also ==
- EU law
- English contract law
