= List of Scottish statutory instruments, 2002 =

This is a complete list of Scottish statutory instruments in 2002.

== 1-100 ==
- BSE Monitoring (Scotland) Amendment Regulations 2002 (S.S.I. 2002/1)
- Environmental Impact Assessment (Uncultivated Land and Semi-Natural Areas) (Scotland) Regulations 2002 (S.S.I. 2002/6)
- Act of Sederunt (Amendment of Ordinary Cause Rules and Summary Applications, Statutory Applications and Appeals etc. Rules) (Applications under the Mortgage Rights (Scotland) Act 2001) 2002 (S.S.I. 2002/7)
- Food Protection (Emergency Prohibitions) (Amnesic Shellfish Poisoning) (West Coast) (No. 9) (Scotland) Revocation Order 2002 (S.S.I. 2002/9)
- River Dee (Kirkcudbright) Salmon Fishery District (Baits and Lures) Regulations 2002 (S.S.I. 2002/11)
- Children (Scotland) Act 1995 (Commencement No. 5) Order 2002 (S.S.I. 2002/12)
- Road Works (Inspection Fees) (Scotland) Amendment Regulations 2002 (S.S.I. 2002/13)
- Motor Vehicles (Competitions and Trials) (Scotland) Amendment Regulations 2002 (S.S.I. 2002/14)
- Local Authorities Etc. (Allowances) (Scotland) Amendment Regulations 2002 (S.S.I. 2002/15)
- National Health Service (Optical Charges and Payments) (Scotland) Amendment Regulations 2002 (S.S.I. 2002/17)
- Scottish Commission for the Regulation of Care (Consultation on Transfer of Staff) Order 2002 (S.S.I. 2002/18)
- Food Protection (Emergency Prohibitions) (Amnesic Shellfish Poisoning) (West Coast) (No. 4) (Scotland) Partial Revocation (No. 2) Order 2002 (S.S.I. 2002/19)
- Food Protection (Emergency Prohibitions) (Amnesic Shellfish Poisoning) (West Coast) (No. 7) (Scotland) Revocation Order 2002 (S.S.I. 2002/20)
- Import and Export Restrictions (Foot-and-Mouth Disease) (Scotland) (No. 3) Amendment Regulations 2002 (S.S.I. 2002/21)
- Cattle Identification (Notification of Movement) (Scotland) Amendment Regulations 2002 (S.S.I. 2002/22)
- Police Act 1997 (Criminal Records) (Registration) (Scotland) Regulations 2002 (S.S.I. 2002/23)
- Children's Hearings (Legal Representation) (Scotland) Amendment Rules 2002 (S.S.I. 2002/30)
- Local Authorities' Traffic Orders (Procedure) (Scotland) Amendment Regulations 2002 (S.S.I. 2002/31)
- Scottish Legal Services Ombudsman (Compensation) (Prescribed Amount) Order 2002 (S.S.I. 2002/32)
- Water Services Charges (Billing and Collection) (Scotland) Order 2002 (S.S.I. 2002/33)
- Disease Control (Interim Measures) (Scotland) Order 2002 (S.S.I. 2002/34)
- Import and Export Restrictions (Foot-and-Mouth Disease) (Scotland) (No. 3) Amendment (No. 2) Regulations 2002 (S.S.I. 2002/35)
- Food and Animal Feedingstuffs (Products of Animal Origin from China) (Control) (Scotland) Regulations 2002 (S.S.I. 2002/36)
- Advice and Assistance (Assistance by Way of Representation) (Scotland) Amendment Regulations 2002 (S.S.I. 2002/37)
- Sheep and Goats Movement (Interim Measures) (Scotland) Order 2002 (S.S.I. 2002/38)
- Sheep and Goats Identification (Scotland) Amendment Regulations 2002 (S.S.I. 2002/39)
- Building Standards (Scotland) Amendment Regulations 2001 Amendment Regulations 2002 (S.S.I. 2002/40)
- Pig Industry Restructuring (Capital Grant) (Scotland) Scheme 2002 (S.S.I. 2002/43)
- Pig Industry Restructuring (Non-Capital Grant) (Scotland) Scheme 2002 (S.S.I. 2002/44)
- Housing Revenue Account General Fund Contribution Limits (Scotland) Order 2002 (S.S.I. 2002/45)
- Damages (Personal Injury) (Scotland) Order 2002 (S.S.I. 2002/46)
- Domestic Water and Sewerage Charges (Reduction) (Scotland) Regulations 2002 (S.S.I. 2002/47)
- Food Protection (Emergency Prohibitions) (Amnesic Shellfish Poisoning) (West Coast) (No. 14) (Scotland) Revocation Order 2002 (S.S.I. 2002/48)
- Food Protection (Emergency Prohibitions) (Amnesic Shellfish Poisoning) (West Coast) (Scotland) Order 2002 (S.S.I. 2002/49)
- Notification of Marketing of Food for Particular Nutritional Uses (Scotland) Regulations 2002 (S.S.I. 2002/50)
- Sea Fishing (Enforcement of Community Quota and Third Country Fishing Measures) (Scotland) Order 2002 (S.S.I. 2002/51)
- Foot-and-Mouth Disease Declaratory (Controlled Area) (Scotland) Amendment and Revocation Order 2002 (S.S.I. 2002/54)
- Ethical Standards in Public Life etc. (Scotland) Act 2000 (Stipulated Time Limit) Order 2002 (S.S.I. 2002/55)
- Road Traffic (NHS Charges) Amendment (Scotland) Regulations 2002 (S.S.I. 2002/56)
- Food Protection (Emergency Prohibitions) (Diarrhetic Shellfish Poisoning) (Orkney) (Scotland) Revocation Order 2002 (S.S.I. 2002/57)
- Sea Fish (Prohibited Methods of Fishing) (Firth of Clyde) Order 2002 (S.S.I. 2002/58)
- Nurses, Midwives and Health Visitors (Professional Conduct) (Amendment) Rules 2002 Approval (Scotland) Order 2002 (S.S.I. 2002/59)
- Scottish Social Services Council (Appointments, Procedure and Access to the Register) Amendment Regulations 2002 (S.S.I. 2002/60)
- Sweeteners in Food Amendment (Scotland) Regulations 2002 (S.S.I. 2002/61)
- Race Relations Act 1976 (Statutory Duties) (Scotland) Order 2002 (S.S.I. 2002/62)
- Children's Hearings (Legal Representation) (Scotland) Rules 2002 (S.S.I. 2002/63)
- Food (Star Anise from Third Countries) (Emergency Control) (Scotland) Order 2002 (S.S.I. 2002/64)
- Food Protection (Emergency Prohibitions) (Amnesic Shellfish Poisoning) (West Coast) (No. 2) (Scotland) Order 2002 (S.S.I. 2002/65)
- Food Protection (Emergency Prohibitions) (Amnesic Shellfish Poisoning) (West Coast) (No. 12) (Scotland) Partial Revocation Order 2002 (S.S.I. 2002/66)
- Food Protection (Emergency Prohibitions) (Amnesic Shellfish Poisoning) (West Coast) (No. 2) (Scotland) Partial Revocation Order 2002 (S.S.I. 2002/67)
- Mobility and Access Committee for Scotland Regulations 2002 (S.S.I. 2002/69)
- Local Government Finance (Scotland) Order 2002 (S.S.I. 2002/70)
- Standards in Scotland's Schools etc. Act 2000 (Commencement No. 5) Order 2002 (S.S.I. 2002/72)
- School Education (Amendment) (Scotland) Act 2002 (Commencement) Order 2002 (S.S.I. 2002/74)
- Health and Social Care Act 2001 (Commencement No. 9) (Scotland) Order 2002 (S.S.I. 2002/75)
- Preserved Rights (Transfer to Responsible Authorities) (Scotland) Regulations 2002 (S.S.I. 2002/76)
- Public Finance and Accountability (Scotland) Act 2000 (Economy, efficiency and effectiveness examinations) (Specified bodies etc.) Order 2002 (S.S.I. 2002/77)
- Public Finance and Accountability (Scotland) Act 2000 (Access to Documents and Information) (Relevant Persons) Order 2002 (S.S.I. 2002/78)
- Food Protection (Emergency Prohibitions) (Amnesic Shellfish Poisoning) (West Coast) (No. 3) (Scotland) Order 2002 (S.S.I. 2002/80)
- Sea Fishing (Enforcement of Community Conservation Measures) (Scotland) Amendment Order 2002 (S.S.I. 2002/81)
- Food Protection (Emergency Prohibitions) (Paralytic Shellfish Poisoning) (Orkney) (No. 3) (Scotland) Revocation Order 2002 (S.S.I. 2002/82)
- Financial Assistance for Environmental Purposes (Scotland) Order 2002 (S.S.I. 2002/83)
- Police and Fire Services (Finance) (Scotland) Act 2001 (Commencement) Order 2002 (S.S.I. 2002/84)
- National Assistance (Sums for Personal Requirements) (Scotland) Regulations 2002 (S.S.I. 2002/85)
- National Health Service (Optical Charges and Payments) and (General Ophthalmic Services) (Scotland) Amendment Regulations 2002 (S.S.I. 2002/86)
- Poultry Meat, Farmed Game Bird Meat and Rabbit Meat (Hygiene and Inspection) Amendment (Scotland) Regulations 2002 (S.S.I. 2002/87)
- Civil Legal Aid (Scotland) Amendment Regulations 2002 (S.S.I. 2002/88)
- Non-Domestic Rate (Scotland) Order 2002 (S.S.I. 2002/89)
- Provision of School Education for Children under School Age (Prescribed Children) (Scotland) Order 2002 (S.S.I. 2002/90)
- Non-Domestic Rates (Levying) (Scotland) Regulations 2002 (S.S.I. 2002/91)
- Electricity from Non-Fossil Fuel Sources (Locational Flexibility) (Scotland) Order 2002 (S.S.I. 2002/92)
- Electricity from Non-Fossil Fuel Sources (Scotland) Saving Arrangements (Modification) Order 2002 (S.S.I. 2002/93)
- Fossil Fuel Levy (Scotland) Amendment Regulations 2002 (S.S.I. 2002/94)
- Adults with Incapacity (Supervision of Welfare Guardians etc. by Local Authorities) (Scotland) Regulations 2002 (S.S.I. 2002/95)
- Adults with Incapacity (Reports in Relation to Guardianship and Intervention Orders) (Scotland) Regulations 2002 (S.S.I. 2002/96)
- Adults with Incapacity (Recall of Guardians' Powers) (Scotland) Regulations 2002 (S.S.I. 2002/97)
- Adults with Incapacity (Non-compliance with Decisions of Welfare Guardians) (Scotland) Regulations 2002 (S.S.I. 2002/98)
- The National Health Service (General Dental Services and Dental Charges) (Scotland) Amendment Regulations 2002 (S.S.I. 2002/99)
- The National Health Service (Charges for Drugs and Appliances) (Scotland) Amendment Regulations 2002 (S.S.I. 2002/100)

== 101-200 ==
- Council Tax (Exempt Dwellings) (Scotland) Amendment Order 2002 (S.S.I. 2002/101)
- Council Tax (Dwellings and Part Residential Subjects) (Scotland) Amendment Regulations 2002 (S.S.I. 2002/102)
- NHS Education for Scotland Order 2002 (S.S.I. 2002/103)
- Control of Noise (Codes of Practice for Construction and Open Sites) (Scotland) Order 2002 (S.S.I. 2002/104)
- Scottish Council for Postgraduate Medical and Dental Education and NHS Education for Scotland (Transfer of Staff) Regulations 2002 (S.S.I. 2002/105)
- Scottish Commission for the Regulation of Care (Appointments and Procedure) Regulations 2002 (S.S.I. 2002/106)
- Prisons and Young Offenders Institutions (Scotland) Amendment Rules 2002 (S.S.I. 2002/107)
- Scottish Commission for the Regulation of Care (Staff Transfer Scheme) Order 2002 (S.S.I. 2002/108)
- Import and Export Restrictions (Foot-and-Mouth Disease) (Scotland) (No. 3) Revocation Regulations 2002 (S.S.I. 2002/109)
- Dairy Produce Quotas (Scotland) Regulations 2002 (S.S.I. 2002/110)
- National Health Service (General Medical Services and Pharmaceutical Services) (Scotland) Amendment Regulations 2002 (S.S.I. 2002/111)
- Regulation of Care (Fees) (Scotland) Order 2002 (S.S.I. 2002/112)
- Regulation of Care (Applications and Provision of Advice) (Scotland) Order 2002 (S.S.I. 2002/113)
- Regulation of Care (Requirements as to Care Services) (Scotland) Regulations 2002 (S.S.I. 2002/114)
- Regulation of Care (Registration and Registers) (Scotland) Regulations 2002 (S.S.I. 2002/115)
- Police Grant (Scotland) Order 2002 (S.S.I. 2002/116)
- Plant Protection Products Amendment (Scotland) Regulations 2002 (S.S.I. 2002/117)
- Water Industry (Scotland) Act 2002 (Commencement and Savings) Order 2002 (S.S.I. 2002/118)
- Restriction of Liberty Order (Scotland) Amendment Regulations 2002 (S.S.I. 2002/119)
- Regulation of Care (Excepted Services) (Scotland) Regulations 2002 (S.S.I. 2002/120)
- Clydeport (Closure of Yorkhill Basin) Harbour Revision Order 2002 (S.S.I. 2002/121)
- Town and Country Planning (Fees for Applications and Deemed Applications) (Scotland) Amendment Regulations 2002 (S.S.I. 2002/122)
- Police Act 1997 (Commencement No. 10) (Scotland) Order 2002 (S.S.I. 2002/124)
- Animals and Animal Products (Import and Export) (Scotland) Amendment Regulations 2002 (S.S.I. 2002/125)
- Food Protection (Emergency Prohibitions) (Amnesic Shellfish Poisoning) (West Coast) (No. 5) (Scotland) Revocation Order 2002 (S.S.I. 2002/126)
- Food Protection (Emergency Prohibitions) (Amnesic Shellfish Poisoning) (West Coast) (No. 8) (Scotland) Revocation Order 2002 (S.S.I. 2002/127)
- Act of Sederunt (Ordinary Cause Rules) Amendment (Applications under the Protection from Abuse (Scotland) Act 2001) 2002 (S.S.I. 2002/128)
- Act of Sederunt (Summary Applications, Statutory Applications and Appeals etc. Rules) Amendment (Detention and Forfeiture of Terrorist Cash) 2002 (S.S.I. 2002/129)
- Act of Sederunt (Summary Applications, Statutory Applications and Appeals etc. Rules) Amendment (No. 2) (Local Government (Scotland) Act 1973) 2002 (S.S.I. 2002/130)
- Adults with Incapacity (Public Guardian's Fees) (Scotland) Amendment Regulations 2002 (S.S.I. 2002/131)
- Act of Sederunt (Summary Cause Rules) 2002 (S.S.I. 2002/132)
- Act of Sederunt (Small Claims Rules) 2002 (S.S.I. 2002/133)
- Budget (Scotland) Act 2001 (Amendment) Order 2002 (S.S.I. 2002/134)
- Act of Adjournal (Criminal Procedure Rules Amendment No.2) (Anti-Terrorism, Crime and Security Act 2001) 2002 (S.S.I. 2002/136)
- Act of Adjournal (Criminal Procedure Rules Amendment) (Convention Rights (Compliance) (Scotland) Act 2001) 2002 (S.S.I. 2002/137)
- Mull Salmon Fishery District Designation (Scotland) Order 2002 (S.S.I. 2002/138)
- Less Favoured Area Support Scheme (Scotland) Regulations 2002 (S.S.I. 2002/139)
- Combined Police Area Amalgamation Schemes 1995 (Amendment) (Scotland) Order 2002 (S.S.I. 2002/140)
- Combined Fire Services Area Administration Schemes (Variation) (Scotland) Order 2002 (S.S.I. 2002/141)
- Nurses, Midwives and Health Visitors (Professional Conduct) (Amendment) (No. 2) Rules 2002 Approval (Scotland) Order 2002 (S.S.I. 2002/142)
- Police Act 1997 (Criminal Records) (Scotland) Regulations 2002 (S.S.I. 2002/143)
- Advice and Assistance (Financial Conditions) (Scotland) Regulations 2002 (S.S.I. 2002/144)
- Civil Legal Aid (Financial Conditions) (Scotland) Regulations 2002 (S.S.I. 2002/145)
- Act of Sederunt (Summary Applications, Statutory Applications and Appeals etc. Rules) Amendment (No. 3) (Adults with Incapacity) 2002 (S.S.I. 2002/146)
- Producer Responsibility Obligations (Packaging Waste) Amendment (Scotland) Regulations 2002 (S.S.I. 2002/147)
- Food (Figs, Hazelnuts and Pistachios from Turkey) (Emergency Control) (Scotland) Regulations 2002 (S.S.I. 2002/148)
- Food (Peanuts from China) (Emergency Control) (Scotland) Regulations 2002 (S.S.I. 2002/149)
- Food Protection (Emergency Prohibitions) (Amnesic Shellfish Poisoning) (West Coast) (Scotland) Revocation Order 2002 (S.S.I. 2002/152)
- National Health Service (General Medical Services and Pharmaceutical Services) (Scotland) Amendment (No. 2) Regulations 2002 (S.S.I. 2002/153)
- Aberdeen City Council and Aberdeenshire Council Boundaries (Blackburn) Amendment Order 2002 (S.S.I. 2002/154)
- Argyll and Bute Council and West Dunbartonshire Council Boundaries (Ardoch Sewage Works) Amendment Order 2002 (S.S.I. 2002/155)
- Glasgow City Council and Renfrewshire Council Boundaries (Braehead) Amendment Order 2002 (S.S.I. 2002/156)
- City of Edinburgh Council and West Lothian Council Boundaries (West Farm, Broxburn) Amendment Order 2002 (S.S.I. 2002/157)
- Electricity Lands and Generators (Rateable Values) (Scotland) Variation Order 2002 (S.S.I. 2002/158)
- Water Undertakings (Rateable Values) (Scotland) Variation Order 2002 (S.S.I. 2002/159)
- Food Protection (Emergency Prohibitions) (Amnesic Shellfish Poisoning) (West Coast) (No. 4) (Scotland) Revocation Order 2002 (S.S.I. 2002/160)
- Civic Government (Scotland) Act 1982 (Licensing of Houses in Multiple Occupation) Amendment Order 2002 (S.S.I. 2002/161)
- Regulation of Care (Scotland) Act 2001 (Commencement No. 2 and Transitional Provisions) Order 2002 (S.S.I. 2002/162)
- Renewables Obligation (Scotland) Order 2002 (S.S.I. 2002/163)
- Plant Health (Great Britain) Amendment (Scotland) Order 2002 (S.S.I. 2002/164)
- Scottish Water (Rate of Return) (Scotland) Order 2002 (S.S.I. 2002/165)
- Water Industry (Scotland) Act 2002 (Consequential and Savings Provisions) Order 2002 (S.S.I. 2002/166)
- Water and Sewerage Charges (Exemption) (Scotland) Regulations 2002 (S.S.I. 2002/167)
- Housing (Scotland) Act 2001 (Commencement No. 4, Transitional Provisions and Savings) Order 2002 (S.S.I. 2002/168)
- Import and Export Restrictions (Foot-and-Mouth Disease) (Scotland) (No. 3) Amendment (No. 2) Amendment Regulations 2002 (S.S.I. 2002/169)
- Community Care and Health (Scotland) Act 2002 (Commencement No. 1) Order 2002 (S.S.I. 2002/170)
- Housing Support Grant (Scotland) Order 2002 (S.S.I. 2002/171)
- Adults with Incapacity (Scotland) Act 2000 (Commencement No. 1) (Amendment) Order 2002 (S.S.I. 2002/172)
- Public Finance and Accountability (Scotland) Act 2000 (Consequential Modifications) Order 2002 (S.S.I. 2002/176)
- Home Zones (Scotland) Regulations 2002 (S.S.I. 2002/177)
- Forth Estuary Transport Authority Order 2002 (S.S.I. 2002/178)
- Food (Jelly Confectionery) (Emergency Control) (Scotland) Regulations 2002 (S.S.I. 2002/179)
- Protection of Wild Mammals (Scotland) Act 2002 (Commencement) Order 2002 (S.S.I. 2002/181)
- Food Protection (Emergency Prohibitions) (Amnesic Shellfish Poisoning) (West Coast) (No. 2) (Scotland) Order 2001 Revocation Order 2002 (S.S.I. 2002/182)
- Food Protection (Emergency Prohibitions) (Amnesic Shellfish Poisoning) (West Coast) (No. 2) (Scotland) Revocation Order 2002 (S.S.I. 2002/183)
- Marriage (Scotland) Act 2002 (Commencement) Order 2002 (S.S.I. 2002/184)
- Loch Ewe, Isle of Ewe, Wester Ross, Scallops Several Fishery (Variation) Order 2002 (S.S.I. 2002/185)
- Little Loch Broom Scallops Several Fishery Order 2002 (S.S.I. 2002/186)
- Road Traffic (Permitted Parking Area and Special Parking Area) (City of Glasgow) Designation Amendment Order 2002 (S.S.I. 2002/187)
- Road Traffic (Permitted Parking Area and Special Parking Area) (City of Edinburgh) Designation Amendment Order 2002 (S.S.I. 2002/188)
- Adults with Incapacity (Scotland) Act 2000 (Commencement No. 2) Order 2002 (S.S.I. 2002/189)
- Adults with Incapacity (Ethics Committee) (Scotland) Regulations 2002 (S.S.I. 2002/190)
- Artificial Insemination of Cattle (Animal Health) (Scotland) Amendment Regulations 2002 (S.S.I. 2002/191)
- National Health Service (General Dental Services) (Scotland) Amendment Regulations 2002 (S.S.I. 2002/192)
- Registration of Fish Farming and Shellfish Farming Businesses Amendment (Scotland) Order 2002 (S.S.I. 2002/193)
- Animals and Animal Products (Import and Export) (Scotland) Amendment (No. 2) Regulations 2002 (S.S.I. 2002/196)
- Food Protection (Emergency Prohibitions) (Amnesic, Paralytic and Diarrhetic shellfish poisoning) (Orkney) (Scotland) Revocation Order 2002 (S.S.I. 2002/197)
- Food Protection (Emergency Prohibitions) (Amnesic Shellfish Poisoning) (West Coast) (No. 12) (Scotland) Revocation Order 2002 (S.S.I. 2002/198)
- Bus User Complaints Tribunal Regulations 2002 (S.S.I. 2002/199)

== 201-300 ==
- Loch Lomond and The Trossachs National Park Designation, Transitional and Consequential Provisions (Scotland) Order 2002 (S.S.I. 2002/201)
- Loch Lomond and The Trossachs National Park Elections (Scotland) Order 2002 (S.S.I. 2002/202)
- Regulation of Investigatory Powers (Source Records) (Scotland) Regulations 2002 (S.S.I. 2002/205)
- Regulation of Investigatory Powers (Juveniles) (Scotland) Order 2002 (S.S.I. 2002/206)
- Regulation of Investigatory Powers (Cancellation of Authorisations) (Scotland) Regulations 2002 (S.S.I. 2002/207)
- Adults with Incapacity (Medical Treatment Certificates) (Scotland) Regulations 2002 (S.S.I. 2002/208)
- Police Act 1997 (Enhanced Criminal Record Certificates) (Protection of Vulnerable Adults) (Scotland) Regulations 2002 (S.S.I. 2002/217)
- Food Protection (Emergency Prohibitions) (Amnesic Shellfish Poisoning) (West Coast) (No. 3) (Scotland) Revocation Order 2002 (S.S.I. 2002/218)
- Registration of Fish Farming and Shellfish Farming Businesses Amendment (No. 2) (Scotland) Order 2002 (S.S.I. 2002/220)
- Disease Control and Animal Movements (Interim Measures) (Scotland) Amendment Order 2002 (S.S.I. 2002/221)
- Plant Health (Phytophthora ramorum) (Scotland) Order 2002 (S.S.I. 2002/223)
- National Health Service (Optical Charges and Payments) (Scotland) Amendment (No. 2) Regulations 2002 (S.S.I. 2002/224)
- Dairy Produce Quotas (Scotland) Amendment Regulations 2002 (S.S.I. 2002/228)
- Local Government Finance (Scotland) (No. 2) Order 2002 (S.S.I. 2002/230)
- Food Protection (Emergency Prohibitions) (Amnesic Shellfish Poisoning) (West Coast) (No. 4) (Scotland) Order 2002 (S.S.I. 2002/231)
- Community Care and Health (Scotland) Act 2002 (Consequential Amendment) Order 2002 (S.S.I. 2002/233)
- Meat (Hazard Analysis and Critical Control Point) (Scotland) Regulations 2002 (S.S.I. 2002/234)
- Act of Sederunt (Fees of Solicitors in the Sheriff Court) (Amendment) 2002 (S.S.I. 2002/235)
- Welfare of Animals (Slaughter or Killing) Amendment (Scotland) Regulations 2002 (S.S.I. 2002/238)
- National Health Service (Clinical Negligence and Other Risks Indemnity Scheme) (Scotland) Amendment Regulations 2002 (S.S.I. 2002/239)
- Criminal Legal Aid (Scotland) (Fees) Amendment Regulations 2002 (S.S.I. 2002/246)
- Criminal Legal Aid (Fixed Payments) (Scotland) Amendment Regulations 2002 (S.S.I. 2002/247)
- St Mary's Music School (Aided Places) (Scotland) Amendment Regulations 2002 (S.S.I. 2002/248)
- Education (Assisted Places) (Scotland) Amendment Regulations 2002 (S.S.I. 2002/249)
- Civil Legal Aid (Scotland) Amendment (No. 2) Regulations 2002 (S.S.I. 2002/254)
- TSE (Scotland) Regulations 2002 (S.S.I. 2002/255)
- Marriage (Approval of Places) (Scotland) Regulations 2002 (S.S.I. 2002/260)
- Valuation and Rating (Exempted Classes) (Scotland) Order 2002 (S.S.I. 2002/262)
- Scottish Transport Group (Dissolution) Order 2002 (S.S.I. 2002/263)
- Community Care (Disregard of Resources) (Scotland) Order 2002 (S.S.I. 2002/264)
- Community Care (Additional Payments) (Scotland) Regulations 2002 (S.S.I. 2002/265)
- Community Care (Deferred Payment of Accommodation Costs) (Scotland) Regulations 2002 (S.S.I. 2002/266)
- Contaminants in Food (Scotland) Regulations 2002 (S.S.I. 2002/267)
- National Health Service (General Dental Services) (Scotland) Amendment (No. 2) Regulations 2002 (S.S.I. 2002/268)
- Sheriff Court Fees Amendment Order 2002 (S.S.I. 2002/269)
- Court of Session etc. Fees Amendment Order 2002 (S.S.I. 2002/270)
- Pesticides (Maximum Residue Levels in Crops, Food and Feeding Stuffs) (Scotland) Amendment Regulations 2002 (S.S.I. 2002/271)
- Loch Caolisport Scallops Several Fishery (Scotland) Order 2002 (S.S.I. 2002/272)
- Act of Sederunt (Fees of Solicitors in the Sheriff Court) (Amendment No. 2) 2002 (S.S.I. 2002/274)
- Adults with Incapacity (Specified Medical Treatments) (Scotland) Regulations 2002 (S.S.I. 2002/275)
- Designation of Nitrate Vulnerable Zones (Scotland) Regulations 2002 (S.S.I. 2002/276)
- New Water and Sewerage Authorities Dissolution (Scotland) Order 2002 (S.S.I. 2002/277)
- Extensification Payment (Scotland) Regulations 2002 (S.S.I. 2002/278)
- Plant Protection Products Amendment (No. 2) (Scotland) Regulations 2002 (S.S.I. 2002/279)
- Act of Sederunt (Fees of Witnesses and Shorthand Writers in the Sheriff Court) (Amendment) 2002 (S.S.I. 2002/280)
- Gaming Act (Variation of Fees) (Scotland) Order 2002 (S.S.I. 2002/281)
- Education (Student Loans) Amendment (Scotland) Regulations 2002 (S.S.I. 2002/282)
- Animal By-Products (Identification) Amendment (Scotland) Regulations 2002 (S.S.I. 2002/283)
- Food (Control of Irradiation) Amendment (Scotland) Regulations 2002 (S.S.I. 2002/284)
- Feeding Stuffs Amendment (Scotland) Regulations 2002 (S.S.I. 2002/285)
- Teachers' Superannuation (Scotland) Amendment Regulations 2002 (S.S.I. 2002/288)
- Bus Service Operators Grant (Scotland) Regulations 2002 (S.S.I. 2002/289)
- Travel Concessions (Eligible Services) (Scotland) Order 2002 (S.S.I. 2002/290)
- Transport (Scotland) Act 2001 (Commencement No. 3 and Transitional Provisions) Order 2002 (S.S.I. 2002/291)
- Home Zones (Scotland) (No. 2) Regulations 2002 (S.S.I. 2002/292)
- Advisory Council (Establishment) (Scotland) Regulations 2002 (S.S.I. 2002/293)
- Peterhead Bay Authority (Constitution) Revision Order 2002 (S.S.I. 2002/294)
- Air Quality (Scotland) Amendment Regulations 2002 (S.S.I. 2002/297)
- Food and Animal Feedingstuffs (Products of Animal Origin from China) (Emergency Control) (Scotland) Regulations 2002 (S.S.I. 2002/300)

== 301-400 ==
- Act of Sederunt (Rules of the Court of Session Amendment) (Fees of Solicitors, Shorthand Writers and Witnesses) 2002 (S.S.I. 2002/301)
- Adults with Incapacity (Specified Medical Treatments) (Scotland) Amendment Regulations 2002 (S.S.I. 2002/302)
- The Community Care (Personal Care and Nursing Care) (Scotland) Regulations 2002 (S.S.I. 2002/303)
- Community Care (Assessment of Needs) (Scotland) Regulations 2002 (S.S.I. 2002/304)
- National Waiting Times Centre Board (Scotland) Order 2002 (S.S.I. 2002/305)
- Food Protection (Emergency Prohibitions) (Amnesic Shellfish Poisoning) (West Coast) (No. 5) (Scotland) Order 2002 (S.S.I. 2002/306)
- Food Protection (Emergency Prohibitions) (Amnesic Shellfish Poisoning) (West Coast) (No. 6) (Scotland) Order 2002 (S.S.I. 2002/307)
- Aberdeen Harbour Revision (Constitution) Order 2002 (S.S.I. 2002/310)
- Local Government Pension Scheme (Scotland) Amendment Regulations 2002 (S.S.I. 2002/311)
- Scottish Secure Tenants (Compensation for Improvements) Regulations 2002 (S.S.I. 2002/312)
- Scottish Secure Tenancies (Abandoned Property) Order 2002 (S.S.I. 2002/313)
- Scottish Secure Tenancies (Exceptions) Regulations 2002 (S.S.I. 2002/314)
- Short Scottish Secure Tenancies (Notices) Regulations 2002 (S.S.I. 2002/315)
- Scottish Secure Tenants (Right to Repair) Regulations 2002 (S.S.I. 2002/316)
- Housing (Right to Buy) (Houses Liable to Demolition) (Scotland) Order 2002 (S.S.I. 2002/317)
- Housing (Scotland) Act 2001 (Scottish Secure Tenancy etc.) Order 2002 (S.S.I. 2002/318)
- Short Scottish Secure Tenancies (Proceedings for Possession) Regulations 2002 (S.S.I. 2002/319)
- Scottish Secure Tenancies (Proceedings for Possession) Regulations 2002 (S.S.I. 2002/320)
- Housing (Scotland) Act 2001 (Commencement No. 5, Transitional Provisions and Savings) Order 2002 (S.S.I. 2002/321)
- Right to Purchase (Application Form) (Scotland) Order 2002 (S.S.I. 2002/322)
- Criminal Justice Act 1988 (Offensive Weapons) Amendment (Scotland) Order 2002 (S.S.I. 2002/323)
- Environmental Impact Assessment (Scotland) Amendment Regulations 2002 (S.S.I. 2002/324)
- The Common Agricultural Policy (Wine) (Scotland) Regulations 2002 (S.S.I. 2002/325)
- Act of Sederunt (Fees of Solicitors in the Sheriff Court) (Amendment No. 3) 2002 (S.S.I. 2002/328)
- Advice and Assistance (Financial Conditions) (Scotland) (No. 2) Regulations 2002 (S.S.I. 2002/329)
- Civil Legal Aid (Financial Conditions) (Scotland) (No. 2) Regulations 2002 (S.S.I. 2002/330)
- Food Protection (Emergency Prohibitions) (Amnesic Shellfish Poisoning) (West Coast) (No. 7) (Scotland) Order 2002 (S.S.I. 2002/332)
- Food Protection (Emergency Prohibitions) (Amnesic Shellfish Poisoning) (West Coast) (No. 8) (Scotland) Order 2002 (S.S.I. 2002/333)
- Welfare of Farmed Animals (Scotland) Amendment Regulations 2002 (S.S.I. 2002/334)
- Late Payment of Commercial Debts (Scotland) Regulations 2002 (S.S.I. 2002/335)
- Late Payment of Commercial Debts (Rate of Interest) (Scotland) Order 2002 (S.S.I. 2002/336)
- Late Payment of Commercial Debts (Interest) Act 1998 (Commencement No. 6) (Scotland) Order 2002 (S.S.I. 2002/337)
- Act of Sederunt (Lands Valuation Appeal Court) 2002 (S.S.I. 2002/340)
- Food Protection (Emergency Prohibitions) (Amnesic Shellfish Poisoning) (Orkney) (Scotland) Order 2002 (S.S.I. 2002/345)
- Contaminants in Food (Scotland) Amendment Regulations 2002 (S.S.I. 2002/349)
- Food Protection (Emergency Prohibitions) (Amnesic Shellfish Poisoning) (West Coast) (No. 9) (Scotland) Order 2002 (S.S.I. 2002/350)
- Food Protection (Emergency Prohibitions) (Amnesic Shellfish Poisoning) (Orkney) (No. 2) (Scotland) Order 2002 (S.S.I. 2002/353)
- Scottish Qualifications Authority Act 2002 (Commencement No. 1) Order 2002 (S.S.I. 2002/355)
- Food and Animal Feedingstuffs (Products of Animal Origin from China) (Emergency Control) (Scotland) Amendment Regulations 2002 (S.S.I. 2002/356)
- Food Protection (Emergency Prohibitions) (Amnesic Shellfish Poisoning) (West Coast) (No. 10) (Scotland) Order 2002 (S.S.I. 2002/357)
- Education (Disability Strategies and Pupils' Educational Records) (Scotland) Act 2002 (Commencement) Order 2002 (S.S.I. 2002/367)
- Disease Control (Interim Measures) (Scotland) Amendment Order 2002 (S.S.I. 2002/369)
- A9 Trunk Road (Ballinluig) (Temporary 50 mph Speed Limit) (Continuation) Order 2002 (S.S.I. 2002/371)
- Sports Grounds and Sporting Events (Designation) (Scotland) Amendment Order 2002 (S.S.I. 2002/82)
- Food Protection (Emergency Prohibitions) (Amnesic Shellfish Poisoning) (West Coast) (No. 5) (Scotland) Partial Revocation Order 2002 (S.S.I. 2002/383)
- Food Protection (Emergency Prohibitions) (Amnesic Shellfish Poisoning) (West Coast) (No. 8) (Scotland) Revocation Order 2002 (S.S.I. 2002/384)
- Act of Adjournal (Criminal Appeals) 2002 (S.S.I. 2002/387)
- Food Protection (Emergency Prohibitions) (Amnesic Shellfish Poisoning) (West Coast) (No. 11) (Scotland) Order 2002 (S.S.I. 2002/388)
- Registration of Births, Deaths and Marriages (Fees) (Scotland) Order 2002 (S.S.I. 2002/389)
- Births, Deaths, Marriages and Divorces (Fees) (Scotland) Amendment Regulations 2002 (S.S.I. 2002/390)
- Education (Disability Strategies) (Scotland) Regulations 2002 (S.S.I. 2002/391)
- Food for Particular Nutritional Uses (Addition of Substances for Specific Nutritional Purposes) (Scotland) Regulations 2002 (S.S.I. 2002/397)
- Road Traffic (Permitted Parking Area and Special Parking Area) (Perth and Kinross Council) Designation Order 2002 (S.S.I. 2002/398)
- Parking Attendants (Wearing of Uniforms) (Perth and Kinross Council Parking Area) Regulations 2002 (S.S.I. 2002/399)
- Road Traffic (Parking Adjudicators) (Perth and Kinross Council) Regulations 2002 (S.S.I. 2002/400)

== 401-500 ==
- Food Protection (Emergency Prohibitions) (Amnesic Shellfish Poisoning) (West Coast) (No. 9) (Scotland) Revocation Order 2002 (S.S.I. 2002/401)
- Food Protection (Emergency Prohibitions) (Amnesic Shellfish Poisoning) (Orkney) (Scotland) Revocation Order 2002 (S.S.I. 2002/402)
- Food Protection (Emergency Prohibitions) (Amnesic Shellfish Poisoning) (Orkney) (No. 2) (Scotland) Revocation Order 2002 (S.S.I. 2002/403)
- Conservation of Seals (Scotland) Order 2002 (S.S.I. 2002/404)
- Education (Listed Bodies) (Scotland) Order 2002 (S.S.I. 2002/406)
- Electricity Act 1989 (Requirement of Consent for Offshore Generating Stations) (Scotland) Order 2002 (S.S.I. 2002/407)
- Food Protection (Emergency Prohibitions) (Amnesic Shellfish Poisoning) (Orkney) (No. 3) (Scotland) Order 2002 (S.S.I. 2002/408)
- Food Protection (Emergency Prohibitions) (Amnesic Shellfish Poisoning) (West Coast) (No. 5) (Scotland) Partial Revocation (No. 2) Order 2002 (S.S.I. 2002/409)
- Comhairle nan Eilean Siar (Various Harbours) Harbour Revision Order 2002 (S.S.I. 2002/410)
- Housing (Scotland) Act 2001 (Registered Social Landlords) Order 2002 (S.S.I. 2002/411)
- Homeless Persons Interim Accommodation (Scotland) Regulations 2002 (S.S.I. 2002/412)
- Housing (Scotland) Act 2001 (Appointment of Arbiter) Order 2002 (S.S.I. 2002/413)
- Homeless Persons Advice and Assistance (Scotland) Regulations 2002 (S.S.I. 2002/414)
- Housing (Scotland) Act 2001 (Scottish Secure Tenancy etc.) Amendment Order 2002 (S.S.I. 2002/415)
- Housing (Scotland) Act 2001 (Registration of Tenant Organisations) Order 2002 (S.S.I. 2002/416)
- Conservation of Salmon (Prohibition of Sale) (Scotland) Regulations 2002 (S.S.I. 2002/418)
- Road Humps and Traffic Calming (Scotland) Amendment Regulations 2002 (S.S.I. 2002/419)
- Police Reform Act 2002 (Commencement No. 2) (Scotland) Order 2002 (S.S.I. 2002/420)
- Food Protection (Emergency Prohibitions) (Amnesic Shellfish Poisoning) (West Coast) (No. 10) (Scotland) Partial Revocation Order 2002 (S.S.I. 2002/421)
- Food Protection (Emergency Prohibitions) (Amnesic Shellfish Poisoning) (West Coast) (No. 7) (Scotland) Order 2002 Revocation Order 2002 (S.S.I. 2002/422)
- Nursing and Midwifery Student Allowances (Scotland) Amendment Regulations 2002 (S.S.I. 2002/423)
- Food (Figs, Hazelnuts and Pistachios from Turkey) (Emergency Control) (Scotland) (No. 2) Regulations 2002 (S.S.I. 2002/424)
- Food (Peanuts from China) (Emergency Control) (Scotland) (No. 2) Regulations 2002 (S.S.I. 2002/425)
- Food Protection (Emergency Prohibitions) (Amnesic Shellfish Poisoning) (West Coast) (No. 12) (Scotland) Order 2002 (S.S.I. 2002/430)
- Food Protection (Emergency Prohibitions) (Amnesic Shellfish Poisoning) (West Coast) (No. 5) (Scotland) Revocation Order 2002 (S.S.I. 2002/431)
- Land Registration (Scotland) Act 1979 (Commencement No. 16) Order 2002 (S.S.I. 2002/432)
- Housing (Scotland) Act 2001 (Commencement No. 6 and Amendment) Order 2002 (S.S.I. 2002/433)
- Scottish Secure Tenancies (Exceptions) Amendment Regulations 2002 (S.S.I. 2002/434)
- Freedom of Information (Scotland) Act 2002 (Commencement No. 1) Order 2002 (S.S.I. 2002/437)
- National Health Service (General Medical Services) (Scotland) Amendment Regulations 2002 (S.S.I. 2002/438)
- Criminal Legal Aid (Scotland) (Fees) Amendment (No. 2) Regulations 2002 (S.S.I. 2002/440)
- Criminal Legal Aid (Scotland) Amendment Regulations 2002 (S.S.I. 2002/441)
- Criminal Legal Aid (Fixed Payments) (Scotland) Amendment (No. 2) Regulations 2002 (S.S.I. 2002/442)
- Sexual Offences (Procedure and Evidence) (Scotland) Act 2002 (Commencement and Transitional Provisions) Order 2002 (S.S.I. 2002/443)
- Housing (Scotland) Act 2001 (Housing Support Services) Regulations 2002 (S.S.I. 2002/444)
- Products of Animal Origin (Third Country Imports) (Scotland) Regulations 2002 (S.S.I. 2002/445)
- Bovines and Bovine Products (Trade) Amendment (Scotland) Regulations 2002 (S.S.I. 2002/449)
- Local Authorities' Traffic Orders (Exemptions for Disabled Persons) (Scotland) Regulations 2002 (S.S.I. 2002/450)
- Disabled Persons (Badges for Motor Vehicles) (Scotland) Amendment Regulations 2002 (S.S.I. 2002/451)
- Act of Adjournal (Criminal Procedure Rules Amendment No. 3) (Sexual Offences (Procedure and Evidence) (Scotland) Act 2002) 2002 (S.S.I. 2002/454)
- Scottish Local Government Elections Rules 2002 (S.S.I. 2002/457)
- Combined Police Area Amalgamation Schemes 1995 Amendment (No. 2) (Scotland) Order 2002 (S.S.I. 2002/458)
- Food Protection (Emergency Prohibitions) (Amnesic Shellfish Poisoning) (West Coast) (No. 13) (Scotland) Order 2002 (S.S.I. 2002/465)
- Scottish Public Services Ombudsman Act 2002 (Commencement and Revocation of Transitory and Transitional Provisions) Order 2002 (S.S.I. 2002/467)
- Scottish Public Services Ombudsman Act 2002 (Amendment) Order 2002 (S.S.I. 2002/468)
- Scottish Public Services Ombudsman Act 2002 (Transitory and Transitional Provisions) Order 2002 (S.S.I. 2002/469)
- Discontinuance of Legalised Police Cells (Ayr) Rules 2002 (S.S.I. 2002/472)
- Water Customer Consultation Panels (Scotland) Order 2002 (S.S.I. 2002/473)
- Food Protection (Emergency Prohibitions) (Amnesic Shellfish Poisoning) (West Coast) (No. 14) (Scotland) Order 2002 (S.S.I. 2002/482)
- Plant Health (Phytophthora ramorum) (Scotland) (No. 2) Order 2002 (S.S.I. 2002/483)
- Pollution Prevention and Control (Designation of Council Directives on Large Combustion Plants and National Emission Ceilings) (Scotland) Order 2002 (S.S.I. 2002/488)
- Pesticides (Maximum Residue Levels in Crops, Food and Feeding Stuffs) (Scotland) Amendment (No. 2) Regulations 2002 (S.S.I. 2002/489)
- Large Combustion Plants (Scotland) Regulations 2002 (S.S.I. 2002/493)
- Civil Legal Aid (Scotland) Regulations 2002 (S.S.I. 2002/494)
- Advice and Assistance (Scotland) Amendment Regulations 2002 (S.S.I. 2002/495)
- Civil Legal Aid (Scotland) (Fees) Amendment Regulations 2002 (S.S.I. 2002/496)
- Plastic Materials and Articles in Contact with Food (Amendment) (Scotland) Regulations 2002 (S.S.I. 2002/498)
- Taxi Drivers' Licences (Carrying of Guide Dogs and Hearing Dogs) (Scotland) Regulations 2002 (S.S.I. 2002/500)

== 501-570 ==
- Peterhead Harbours Revision (Constitution) Order 2002 (S.S.I. 2002/504)
- Food Protection (Emergency Prohibitions) (Amnesic Shellfish Poisoning) (West Coast) (No. 10) (Scotland) Revocation Order 2002 (S.S.I. 2002/510)
- Food Protection (Emergency Prohibitions) (Amnesic Shellfish Poisoning) (West Coast) (No. 15) (Scotland) Order 2002 (S.S.I. 2002/511)
- Tobacco Advertising and Promotion Act 2002 (Commencement) (Scotland) Order 2002 (S.S.I. 2002/512)
- Act of Sederunt (Fees of Messengers-At-Arms) 2002 (S.S.I. 2002/513)
- Act of Sederunt (Rules of the Court of Session Amendment No. 2) (Applications under the Protection from Abuse (Scotland) Act 2001) 2002 (S.S.I. 2002/514)
- Act of Sederunt (Fees of Sheriff Officers) 2002 (S.S.I. 2002/515)
- Act of Sederunt (Summary Cause Rules) (Amendment) 2002 (S.S.I. 2002/516)
- Act of Adjournal (Criminal Procedure Rules Amendment No 4) (Extradition) 2002 (S.S.I. 2002/517)
- Potatoes Originating in Egypt (Scotland) Amendment Regulations 2002 (S.S.I. 2002/518)
- Fur farming (Prohibition) (Scotland) Act 2002 (Commencement) Order 2002 (S.S.I. 2002/519)
- Seeds (Miscellaneous Amendments) (Scotland) Regulations 2002 (S.S.I. 2002/520)
- Taxi Drivers' Licences (Carrying of Guide Dogs and Hearing Dogs) (Scotland) Amendment Regulations 2002 (S.S.I. 2002/521)
- Scottish Local Government Elections Amendment Rules 2002 (S.S.I. 2002/522)
- Kava-kava in Food (Scotland) Regulations 2002 (S.S.I. 2002/523)
- Food Labelling Amendment (Scotland) Regulations 2002 (S.S.I. 2002/524)
- Seeds (Fees) (Scotland) Regulations 2002 (S.S.I. 2002/526)
- Smoke Control Areas (Authorised Fuels) (Scotland) Amendment Regulations 2002 (S.S.I. 2002/527)
- Road Traffic (NHS Charges) Amendment (No. 2) (Scotland) Regulations 2002 (S.S.I. 2002/528)
- Poultry Breeding Flocks, Hatcheries and Animal By Products (Fees) (Scotland) Order 2002 (S.S.I. 2002/529)
- Disease Control (Interim Measures) (Scotland) Amendment (No. 2) Order 2002 (S.S.I. 2002/530)
- Sheep and Goats Identification (Scotland) Amendment (No. 2) Regulations 2002 (S.S.I. 2002/531)
- Legal Aid (Scotland) Act 1986 Amendment Regulations 2002 (S.S.I. 2002/532)
- Community Care (Joint Working etc.) (Scotland) Regulations 2002 (S.S.I. 2002/533)
- NHS Quality Improvement Scotland Order 2002 (S.S.I. 2002/534)
- NHS Quality Improvement Scotland (Transfer of Officers) Regulations 2002 (S.S.I. 2002/535)
- Plant Protection Products Amendment (No. 3) (Scotland) Regulations 2002 (S.S.I. 2002/537)
- Removal and Disposal of Vehicles Amendment (Scotland) Regulations 2002 (S.S.I. 2002/538)
- Pigs (Records, Identification and Movement) (Scotland) Amendment Order 2002 (S.S.I. 2002/540)
- Genetically Modified Organisms (Deliberate Release) (Scotland) Regulations 2002 (S.S.I. 2002/541)
- Budget (Scotland) Act 2002 Amendment Order 2002 (S.S.I. 2002/542)
- Food Protection (Emergency Prohibitions) (Amnesic Shellfish Poisoning) (West Coast) (No. 16) (Scotland) Order 2002 (S.S.I. 2002/544)
- Food Protection (Emergency Prohibitions) (Amnesic Shellfish Poisoning) (West Coast) (No. 11) (Scotland) Partial Revocation Order 2002 (S.S.I. 2002/545)
- Designation of Nitrate Vulnerable Zones (Scotland) (No. 2) Regulations 2002 (S.S.I. 2002/546)
- Local Authorities' Traffic Orders (Exemptions for Disabled Persons) (Scotland) Amendment Regulations 2002 (S.S.I. 2002/547)
- Public Service Vehicles (Registration of Local Services) (Scotland) Amendment Regulations 2002 (S.S.I. 2002/548)
- School Crossing Patrol Sign (Scotland) Regulations 2002 (S.S.I. 2002/549)
- Food Protection (Emergency Prohibitions) (Amnesic Shellfish Poisoning) (West Coast) (No. 4) (Scotland) Order 2002 Revocation Order 2002 (S.S.I. 2002/550)
- Food Protection (Emergency Prohibitions) (Amnesic Shellfish Poisoning) (West Coast) (No. 6) (Scotland) Partial Revocation Order 2002 (S.S.I. 2002/551)
- Food Protection (Emergency Prohibitions) (Amnesic Shellfish Poisoning) (West Coast) (No. 12) (Scotland) Partial Revocation Order 2002 (S.S.I. 2002/552)
- Food Protection (Emergency Prohibitions) (Amnesic Shellfish Poisoning) (West Coast) (No. 14) (Scotland) Partial Revocation Order 2002 (S.S.I. 2002/553)
- Air Quality Limit Values (Scotland) Amendment Regulations 2002 (S.S.I. 2002/556)
- Inverness Harbour Revision (Constitution) Order 2002 (S.S.I. 2002/557)
- Food Protection (Emergency Prohibitions) (Amnesic Shellfish Poisoning) (Orkney) (No. 3) (Scotland) Partial Revocation Order 2002 (S.S.I. 2002/558)
- Act of Sederunt (Debt Arrangement and Attachment (Scotland) Act 2002) 2002 (S.S.I. 2002/560)
- Scottish Local Government Elections Regulations 2002 (S.S.I. 2002/561)
- Adoption (Intercountry Aspects) Act 1999 (Commencement No. 7) (Scotland) Order 2002 (S.S.I. 2002/562)
- Act of Sederunt (Summary Applications, Statutory Applications and Appeals etc. Rules) Amendment (No. 5) (Proceeds of Crime Act 2002) 2002 (S.S.I. 2002/563)
- Seeds (Miscellaneous Amendments) (No. 2) (Scotland) Regulations 2002 (S.S.I. 2002/564)
- Products of Animal Origin (Third Country Imports) (Scotland) Amendment Regulations 2002 (S.S.I. 2002/565)
- Act of Sederunt (Fees of Messengers-at-Arms) (No. 2) 2002 (S.S.I. 2002/566)
- Act of Sederunt (Fees of Sheriff Officers) (No. 2) 2002 (S.S.I. 2002/567)
- Act of Sederunt (Fees of Solicitors in the Sheriff Court) (Amendment No. 4) 2002 (S.S.I. 2002/568)
- Proceeds of Crime Act 2002 (Cash Searches: Constables in Scotland: Code of Practice) Order 2002 (S.S.I. 2002/569)
- Act of Sederunt (Rules of the Court of Session Amendment No. 2) (Personal Injuries Actions) 2002 (S.S.I. 2002/570)
