= Late Payment Directive =

Directive 2011/7/EU
- European Union directive
- Title: DIRECTIVE 2011/7/EU OF THE EUROPEAN PARLIAMENT AND OF THE COUNCIL of 16 February 2011 on combating late payment in commercial transactions
- Made by: European Parliament & Council of the EU

The Late Payment Directive, 2011/7/EU is a Directive of the European Union concerning commercial late payments. It replaced the previous Late Payment Directive 2000/35/EC.

Like all European Union directives, this is an instrument which requires member states to enact its provisions in national legislation by 16 March 2013. The directive applies to all member states.

The directive aims to achieve 'a decisive shift to a culture of prompt payment' and requires debtors to pay interest and the reasonable recovery costs of the creditor if they do not pay for goods or services on time. The limits are within 60 days for businesses and within 30 days for public authorities.

In Ireland, the Directive has been implemented through the European Communities (Late Payment in Commercial Transactions) Regulations 2012. In the United Kingdom, the Directive was implemented through the Late Payment of Commercial Debts Regulations 2013 (SI 395/2013).

In 2016, the European Commission reported concerns that in commercial relations, businesses, especially small and medium-sized enterprises (SMEs), are reluctant to:

(a) Dispute the terms of a contract (ex. payment term, rate of interest for late payment etc.)

(b) Chase the payment of their unpaid invoices

(c) Claim interest for late payment and compensation for recovery costs

(d) Refer the buyer to court for non-respect of the agreed contractual terms.

In an invitation to tender issued on 19 July 2016, the Commission has indicated its intention to undertake "an in-depth assessment of measures, both regulatory and voluntary, that have been put in place in the Member States to address the problem of late payment in commercial relations between undertakings".

== See also ==
- Payment Services Directive
- Late Payment of Commercial Debts (Interest) Act 1998
- Antonio Tajani § Late Payments Directive
