= Consumer Rights Directive 2011 =

Consumer protection measure in EU law

The Consumer Rights Directive 2011/83/EU is a consumer protection measure in EU law. It was due to be implemented by 13 December 2013.

== Scope ==
The Directive applies to most contracts between traders and consumers and applied to all contracts concluded after 13 June 2014. Exceptions include financial services, gambling, healthcare by regulated professionals, package travel, property transactions, social services, timeshare and most aspects of passenger transport.

== Content ==
The Consumer Rights Directive contains provisions on:

- Information to be given before a consumer buys goods or services on the trader’s premises
- Information to be given before a consumer buys goods or services away from the trader's premises (e.g. at home or at a fair), or at a distance (internet, telesales)
- Cancellation rights and responsibilities where the consumer buys goods or services away from the trader's premises or at a distance
- Delivery times for goods – clarifying what deadlines for delivery should be and where responsibilities lie if there is a problem
- Post-contract customer helplines, where existing customers must be charged no more than the basic rate for phone calls
- Additional payments (on top of the main price of a purchase) which would need to have active or express consent of the consumer. An example is that pre-ticked boxes which the consumer must 'untick' will no longer be allowed
- Fees charged for a particular method of payment (e.g. credit card surcharges).

== Implementation ==
The UK government held a consultation in 2012. The new laws overhaul a number of consumer protection measures originally enacted long before the rise of internet shopping and fit together with a number of other changes to form a new Consumer Bill of Rights replacing more than a dozen older, often overlapping and inconsistent laws. Outdated Spanish mortgage laws have already been shown to be in breach of the new rules and must conform.

== See also ==
- EU law
- English contract law
