= Invitel =

Hungarian telecommunications company

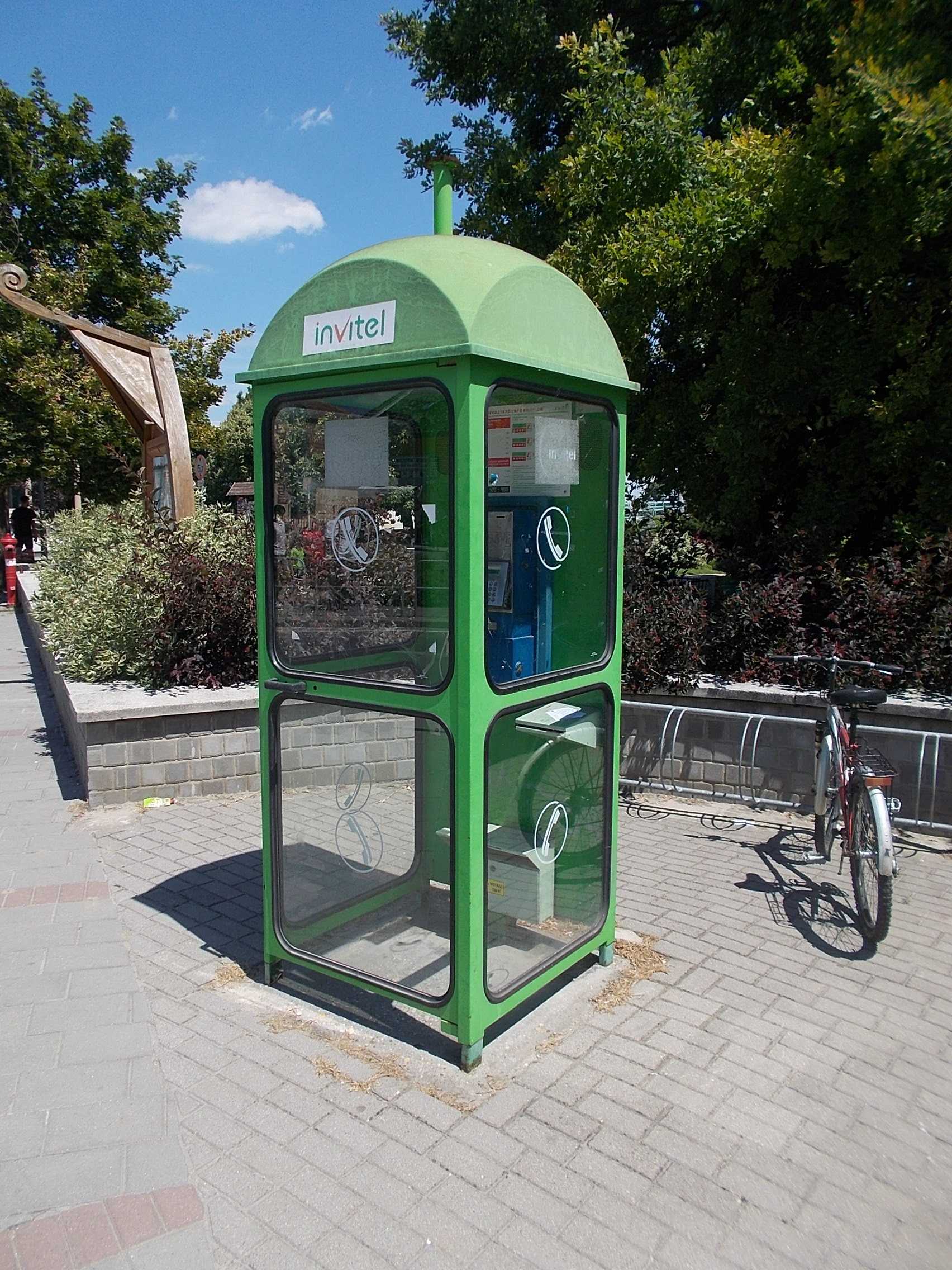
- Company type: Private
- Industry: Telecommunications
- Founded: 1995; 31 years ago
- Defunct: December 31, 2022; 3 years ago
- Fate: Acquired by Digi
- Headquarters: Budaörs, Hungary
- Area served: Hungary
- Products: Fixed Telephony, Mobile Telephony, Broadband Internet, IT Services, Networking Solutions, Digital TV
- Website: www.invitel.hu

Invitel was a Hungarian telecommunications company. Invitel has been operating in Hungary since 1995, through predecessor companies. Since 2002, the group has been using the name Invitel. In 2018, Invitel was acquired by Romanian company Digi Communications. After the acquisition operated as a subsidiary of Digi until on 31 December 2022 when it was merged.

== Ownership ==
Invitel is majority owned by Mid Europa Partners (MEP), which focuses on Central and Eastern Europe as a leading private equity investor. [1] Leaders of the group have more than 10 years of experience in investing in domestic markets and currently handle assets of around EUR 3.2 billion in funds. The MEP has brought significant knowledge to Invitel, primarily in the broadband telecommunications sector in the region, which is a strategic value.

In line with the customary practice in the telecommunications industry, Magyar Telecom B.V. (Matel), a wholly owned subsidiary of MEP, 100% directly owned by Invitel, was issued and refinanced at the Luxembourg Stock Exchange in 2004 to finance the Invitel Group. In 2013, Matel transformed the Group's capital structure to create a long-term sustainable financing structure for its optimal operation.

At the beginning of 2017, MEP sold its majority stake to the China-CEE Fund Private Equity Fund.

In July 2017, it was announced that DIGI Távközlési és Szolgáltató Kft. (Digi TV) will acquire the shares of Invitel.
