= Unfair Terms in Consumer Contracts Directive 1993 =

The Unfair Terms in Consumer Contracts Directive (93/13/EEC) is a European Union directive (issued as a "European Economic Community directive" in 1993) governing the use of unfair or onerous terms used by businesses (referred to as "sellers" or "suppliers") in their contractual dealings with consumers. The directive was amended in 2011 (by Directive 2011/83/EU) and in 2019 (by Directive 2019/2161). Subject to safeguards, a contractual term which has been individually negotiated by the seller and consumer will not be treated as "unfair".

== Purpose ==
The directive reflects the European Union's desire to establish a single or internal market with progressive harmonisation of laws, so that goods and services, persons and capital can move more freely across the Union, whilst aligning the framework for protecting consumers. The European Court of Justice, in its jurisprudence on cases raising unfair terms issues, has noted that

The system of protection implemented by the Directive is based on the idea that the consumer is in a weak position vis-à-vis the seller or supplier, as regards both his bargaining power and his level of knowledge. This leads to the consumer agreeing to terms drawn up in advance by the seller or supplier without being able to influence the content of those terms.

The directive therefore requires member states to ensure that unfair terms are not binding on consumers.

== National law ==
=== Hungary ===
Unfair terms in consumer contracts are declared void by paragraph 209/A(2) of the Hungarian Civil Code, which also states in paragraph 209(1) that

A standard contractual term or a contractual term not negotiated individually in a consumer contract shall be unfair if it establishes the rights and obligations of the parties arising from the contract unilaterally and unjustifiably, in breach of the requirements of good faith and fairness and to the detriment of the party to the contract who did not draw up that term.

Paragraph 2(d) of Government Decree 18/1999 (II. 5.) on terms to be considered unfair in consumer contracts, dated 5 February 1999 (Magyar Közlöny 1999/8), states that

The terms of a consumer agreement must in particular be regarded as unfair, unless evidence is provided to the contrary, if they enable the party entering into the contract with the consumer to amend the contract unilaterally and without having to provide justification, particularly where that party increases the level of financial recompense defined in the contract, or if such terms enable the party entering into the contract with the consumer to amend the contract unilaterally on justified grounds as defined in the contract where the consumer is not entitled to terminate or cancel the contract with immediate effect.

=== United Kingdom ===
Unfair Terms in Consumer Contracts Regulations 1994
- Statutory Instrument
- Parliament of the United Kingdom
- Citation: SI 1994/3159

Dates
- Made: 8 December 1994
- Laid before Parliament: 14 December 1994
- Commencement: 1 July 1995
- Revoked: 1 October 1999

Other legislation
- Made under: European Communities Act 1972
- Transposes: Council Directive 93/13/EEC
- Revoked by: Unfair Terms in Consumer Contracts Regulations 1999

Status: Revoked

Text of statute as originally enacted

Unfair Terms in Consumer Contracts Regulations 1999
- Statutory Instrument
- Parliament of the United Kingdom
- Citation: SI 1999/2083

Dates
- Made: 22 July 1999
- Laid before Parliament: 22 July 1999
- Commencement: 1 October 1999
- Revoked: 1 October 2015

Other legislation
- Repeals/revokes: Unfair Terms in Consumer Contracts Regulations 1994
- Made under: European Communities Act 1972
- Transposes: Council Directive 93/13/EEC
- Revoked by: Consumer Rights Act 2015

Status: Revoked

Text of statute as originally enacted

In the United Kingdom the Unfair Terms in Consumer Contracts Regulations 1994 (SI 1994/3159) and the Unfair Terms in Consumer Contracts Regulations 1999 (SI 1999/2083) are UK statutory instruments, which implemented the EU's directive.

== See also ==
- English contract law
- EU law
- OFT v Abbey National plc
