= Bills of Exchange Act =

Bills of Exchange Act may refer to:

- Bills of Exchange Act 1882, United Kingdom
- Bills of Exchange Act 1908, New Zealand

== See also ==
- Bill of Exchange
- Crossing of cheques
