= Re a Company (No 001418 of 1988) =

UK insolvency law case

- Court: High Court of Justice (Chancery Division)
- Full case name: Re a Company (No 001418 of 1988)
- Decided: 1990
- Citation: [1990] BCC 526

Court membership
- Judge sitting: Judge Bromley Q.C.

Re a Company (No 001418 of 1988) [1990] BCC 526 is a UK insolvency law case, on the offence of fraudulent trading under s.213 of the Insolvency Act 1986.

== Facts ==
The company had exceeded its overdraft limit and fallen behind in payments for PAYE, National Insurance contributions, VAT and debts to creditors (totalling around £212,618). Nevertheless Mr Barford, the company's director and majority shareholder, paid himself an increasingly high salary in the very years that debts were mounting to creditors.

== Judgment ==
Judge Bromley Q.C. held that Mr Barford was guilty of fraudulent trading. He ordered £156,420 be contributed for the debts and liabilities, containing a compensatory element for the debts that were part of the fraudulent trading and a punitive element of £25,000 (following R v. Grantham [1984] QB 675). He held there was "real moral blame" in continuing the company's trading when there was no reason to think that the company could pay its debts as they fell due.

In my judgment the amounts of remuneration were very high for a company in such a state. For the year ended 31 March 1983 the remuneration was £35,000. That was the year of the substantial profit and I see the case that that might well have been justified. However, the following year, to 31 March 1984, the remuneration package increased to £37,521. That was the year where there was a sharp swing to loss and a large adverse change in the net assets position. For the year ended 31 March 1985 the directors' remuneration total was £41,726-even higher – and I ask rhetorically, what were the directors doing paying themselves these significant and increasing sums while the debts to the company's creditors mounted?

I also heard evidence about a caravan. Mr Barford - not the company - contracted to buy it on hire purchase on 6 August 1983. It was treated as an asset of the company in its books. The company paid the monthly instalments by standing order of £199-odd, and it did that from September 1984 continuously through to May 1986, until just before its liquidation. The Inland Revenue have not accepted those payments as a company trading expense.

The position is that while the company's position was deteriorating as it did down to insolvency, the caravan, for which as an asset of the company for its benefit there is no evidence, was continuing to be paid for by the company. In my judgment in relation to the company's creditors, that was reprehensible.

By the end of July 1984 I find that Mr Barford knew:

- (1) that he owed the Customs and Excise for VAT £10,701;
- (2) that he owed the Inland Revenue for PAYE and national insurance a sum in excess of £46,000;
- (3) that there had been a serious deterioration as to the deficiency of net assets;
- (4) that his bankers were continuing to show concern;
- (5) that he was taking extended credit out of Brewster;
- (6) that he had no reason to believe that the company was trading profitably, i.e. that he knew, in my judgment, the position was continuing to deteriorate; nevertheless,
- (7) large directors' remuneration continued; and
- (8) the company continued to pay for his caravan.

Mr Barford told me that he did not intend to defraud creditors and he did not know about fraudulent trading. I am satisfied that he was in full control of the company and had full knowledge of its affairs. He is an experienced businessman. He told me that his wife's business failed and she was ill and that there appears to be a divorce pending. However, in my judgment within the principles I have referred to, from the end of July 1984 at least Mr Barford had no reason for thinking that the company could pay its debts as they fell due or shortly thereafter. There was in my judgment real moral blame according to current notions of fair trading in his procuring the company to continue to trade, i.e. within the meaning of the section, dishonesty. I accordingly determine that there was fraudulent trading and, as a convenient date for start, that it began on the 31 July 1984.

As to 1985 onwards little, in my judgment, needs to be said. The position continued to deteriorate. The accounts sent to Barclays for January 1985 showed a net assets deficiency of £185,451. There was a significant scale of dishonoured cheques from February 1985 onwards, and on 26 March 1985 Barclays wrote to the company suggesting that it find other bankers and repay the indebtedness. It was at about that time that the company arranged to sell its premises, and that sale was completed-it seems after some delays-in July 1985 and Barclays was paid off. Also in that month Brayford Plastics sued the company and, as I have said, eventually the company progressed into a creditors' voluntary liquidation on 6 June 1986, showing a very substantial deficiency as to unsecured creditors.

The question now arises as to the form of the relief. Having been helpfully taken through the authorities by Mr Hollington the following principles are in my view relevant on this application by a liquidator.

- (1) The declaration should specify responsibility for a definite sum and not be in general terms as, for example, to creditors whose debts were incurred after commencement of the fraudulent trading (see Re William C Leitch Bros Ltd [1932] 2 Ch 71 at pp. 77–79, per Maugham J).
- (2) The provision being applied is in the nature of a punitive provision (see the same case at p. 80). It follows that the declared sum may be or contain a punitive element as well as a compensatory element (see per Lord Denning MR in Re Cyona Distributors Ltd [1967] Ch 889, at p. 902).
- (3) The usual order on an application by a liquidator is that the sum for which the person concerned is declared to be personally liable ought to be dealt with as part of the general assets in the liquidation (see per Eve J in Re William C Leitch Bros Ltd (No. 2) [1933] Ch 261, approved by Lord Denning in Re Cyona Distributors Ltd at p. 902).
- (4) So far as the sum for which the person in question is declared to be responsible is compensatory, then in my judgment it is more appropriate under this particular statutory provision to adopt the approach of Maugham J in the first Leitch case at p. 80, i.e. to limit the sum to the amount of the debts of the creditors proved to have been defrauded by the fraudulent trading.

Mr Hollington urged me to adopt the formulation of Knox J in Re Produce Marketing Consortium Ltd (1989) 5 BCC 569, where his Lordship said, at p. 597G:

"Prima facie the appropriate amount that a director is declared to be liable to contribute is the amount by which the company's assets can be discerned to have been depleted by the director's conduct which caused the discretion under sec. 214(1) to arise."

That is a reference to the Insolvency Act of 1986. The preceding section of that, sec. 213, is the re-enactment of sec. 630 of the Companies Act 1985, with which I am concerned.

Knox J was, however, concerned with a different statutory provision and it is, I think, preferable to found myself on a direct nexus with the statutory language before me, particularly in the light of Maugham J's observations. (I add that there may not be a difference of principle and I am in no way dissenting from what Knox J said.) Where the context is fraudulent trading with intent to defraud creditors, there is a clear logic in asking what the creditors have lost as a result of the fraudulent trading. I agree with Mr Hollington that an adequate measure of the maximum compensatory element (I emphasise maximum) is the amount of the trading loss during the period of fraudulent trading. I differ from him in that I exclude the amount of extraordinary items for the year ended 31 March 1986, namely, the loss on the sale of the freehold property, £4,136, and the loss on the sale of fixtures and fittings, £12,152. I see no nexus to establish these losses as the consequence of fraudulent trading or any evidence that those losses would have been different on a sale at any other time than, in fact, March–July 1985. With that adjustment the trading losses for the period of fraudulent trading were:

- 31 July 84 to 31 March 85... £15,000 on an apportionment (which I accept)
- 1 April 85 to 31 March 86... £96,610
- 1 April 86 to 6 June 86... £27,810

[... totalling] £131,420. While this is a compensatory maximum I see no reason to reduce it.

I am satisfied that there are elements in this case which point to a need for a considerable punitive element. Thus, first, Mr Barford well knew from the years of Barclays' concern expressed to him and the accounts that he was providing that he was trading dangerously. There were large excesses of current liabilities over the current assets which did not come down, and there were serious cash flow difficulties. Secondly, the fraudulent trading continued for a long period after 31 July 1984 for some 22 months, drawing more creditors into the net. Thirdly, the directors' remuneration was high in relation to a company in such a long-continued parlous financial state. Fourthly, the change of name and the reverse at the least must have been appreciated to be confusing to creditors, whether or not it was intended to lead to that confusion. Fifthly, the company continued to pay throughout for the caravan as I have indicated. I consider that a punitive element of £25,000 is appropriate. The total of the two sums of £131,420 and £25,000 is £156,420, and that is the amount as to which I propose to make a declaration.

Subject to any submissions which may be I propose to declare that (1) Mr Barford was knowingly party to the carrying on of the business of the company with intent to defraud creditors for the period 31 July 1984 to liquidation, and is to be personally liable to the extent of £156,420 for its debts and liabilities, and (2) that sum shall form part of the general assets in the liquidation of the company.

== See also ==
- R v. Grantham [1984] QB 675
- Re Augustus Barnett & Son Ltd [1986] BCLC 170
- Re Sarflax Ltd [1979] Ch 592
