= Re Sarflax Ltd =

1979 High Court insolvency case

- Court: High Court of Justice (Chancery Division)
- Full case name: Re Sarflax Ltd
- Decided: 1979
- Citation: [1979] Ch 592; [1979] 1 All E.R. 529

Court membership
- Judge sitting: Oliver J

Re Sarflax Ltd [1979] Ch 592; [1979] 1 All E.R. 529 is a UK insolvency law case concerning voidable preferences and fraudulent trading, now in the Insolvency Act 1986. It concerns the definition of "intention to defraud", which is found in a number of legal provisions.

== Facts ==
Sarflax Ltd was in liquidation. It incurred another debt after a judgment that it had delivered unsatisfactory goods. The liquidator moved for a declaration that the delivery of these unsatisfactory goods was evidence of fraudulent trading. It also argued Sarflax had preferred other creditors over the deliveree, knowing it was unable to pay its debts in full.

== Judgment ==
Oliver J held that "intention to defraud" in the voidable preference section (now Insolvency Act 1986, section 239) did not cover a case where a debtor merely knew or had grounds to think he had no sufficient funds to pay creditors in full.

== See also ==
- R v. Grantham [1984] QB 675
- Re Augustus Barnett & Son Ltd [1986] BCLC 170
- Re a Company (No 001418 of 1988) [1990] BCC 526
