= R v Whiteley =

English criminal law case

- Court: Court of Appeal
- Decided: 4 February 1991
- Citation: (1991) 93 Cr App R 25, (1991) 155 JP 917, [1992] ECC 485, [1993] FSR 168, [1991] Crim LR 436, (1991) 155 JPN 378, (1991) 135 SJ 249

Court membership
- Judges sitting: Lord Chief Justice Lord Lane, Mr Justice Owen, Mr Justice Pill

Keywords
- criminal damage, cybercrime

R v Whiteley (1991) 93 Cr App R 25 was an important case in the criminal law of England & Wales in relation to criminal damage. It established that for the purposes of the Criminal Damage Act 1971, the property in question must be tangible but the damage done may be intangible. The case related to hacking and tampering with information on a computer. By the time the appeal was heard, section 3(6) of the Computer Misuse Act 1990 added into law that modifying the contents of a computer was not to be regarded as damage to the computer or computer storage medium, unless the effects impaired the storage medium's physical condition. This did not affect the appeal as the offence had taken place before the Act went into effect.

== Facts ==
Nicholas Alan Whiteley hacked the Joint Academy Network (JANET) system and altered information stored on discs causing computers to fail. There was no physical damage to the computers or the discs. He was acquitted on charges relating to damage of the computers themselves. However, in relation to the discs, he was convicted on four counts of damaging property, on the basis that he had altered the magnetic particles of the disc and that the particles and the data they stored were one entity capable of being damaged.

He appealed on the basis that the disc itself and the intangible data stored on it were distinguishable, and the latter could not be damaged.

== Judgment ==
The judges considered the appellant's argument to be fallacious. They summarised it as essentially saying that because the magnetic particles were imperceptible to unaided human senses, the appellants interference could only be to intangible information. They rejected this argument, finding that the magnetic particles were a part of the disc, and by interfering with the magnetic particles the appellant had impaired the value and usefulness of the discs. The fact that the alteration could only be perceived by operating the computer did not make the damage any less real.

The judgment made particular reference to the cases of Cox v Riley and Morphitis v Salmon among others. The former was a case in which a computerised machine was rendered inoperable when a disgruntled employee erased the programme necessary for it to function. The latter was a case in which a barrier had been dismantled, that found that the meaning of damage in the relevant Act had a wide meaning that went beyond physical harm. They summarised the authorities thus:

Any alteration to the physical nature of the property concerned may amount to damage within the meaning of the section. Whether it does so or not will depend upon the effect that the alteration has had upon the legitimate operator (who for convenience may be referred to as the owner). If the hacker's actions do not go beyond, for example, mere tinkering with an otherwise “empty” disc, no damage would be established. Where, on the other hand, the interference with the disc amounts to an impairment of the value or usefulness of the disc to the owner, then the necessary damage is established.

== Significance ==
The judgment is of limited significance due to the acts in question now being under statutes written specifically to address cybercrime. It is still noteworthy that criminal damage need not be tangible, and this aspect of the judgment remains good law. The case was mentioned in Attorney General's Reference (No. 1 of 2022), well after modern cybercrime laws were established, illustrating that the case is still relevant to criminal damage despite its connection to cybercrime.
