= Tom Stuart-Smith =

Landscape architect & garden designer

Tom Stuart-Smith OBE
- Born: Thomas Richard Stephen Peregrine Stuart-Smith; 14 February 1960 (age 65); St Albans, Hertfordshire, England
- Education: Radley College; Corpus Christi College, Cambridge (MA); Manchester University (MLA)
- Occupation: Landscape architect/garden designer
- Father: Sir Murray Stuart-Smith
- Relatives: Sir Jeremy Stuart-Smith (brother)

Thomas Richard Stephen Peregrine Stuart-Smith OBE (born 14 February 1960) is an English landscape architect, garden designer and writer. He specialises in making gardens that combine naturalism and modernity.

== Early life and education ==
The son of Appeal Court judge Sir Murray Stuart-Smith, he was brought up in Hertfordshire on the Serge Hill estate in Bedmond. Four generations of his family have lived at Serge Hill since his grandfather bought the estate in 1927. After earning a degree in Zoology at Corpus Christi College, Cambridge, he went on to study at Manchester University in 1982 to develop his research interests in landscape architecture and design. In 1986 Tom renovated a dilapidated barn and its surrounding fields into his new home, creating The Barn Garden at Serge Hill. In the summer of 2013, the first Festival of Garden Literature in the UK was held at The Barn Garden.

== Career ==
After working with Hal Moggridge and Elizabeth Banks, Stuart-Smith established his own landscape design business in 1998. Since 1984, he has designed a number of large private and public gardens in the English countryside as well as smaller inner city gardens, as well as overseas projects throughout Europe, India, the US and the Caribbean. His most notable work includes Broughton Grange (commissioned by Stephen Hester) in Oxfordshire, Mount St John in Yorkshire, Fort Belvedere in Windsor Great Park, and a new garden at Windsor Castle which was commissioned by the Royal Household to mark the Queen's Golden Jubilee. Stuart-Smith was also involved with landscape designer Piet Oudolf in creating a landscape masterplan at Trentham Gardens and the recasting of its Italian garden. More recent work includes the two-hectare garden around the Bicentenary Glasshouse at Wisley for the Royal Horticultural Society, which was opened to the public by the Queen in June 2007. In 2013 Tom worked with Factum Arte to create a unique brass sculpture of an Ilex crenata tree for The Garden of Illusion at The Connaught hotel in London. He was also commissioned to create the Keeper's House Garden at the Royal Academy of Arts. Stuart-Smith has designed eight Gold Medal-winning gardens at the Chelsea Flower Show, with three being awarded best in show. An exhibition on his work, the first about a living garden designer in the UK, was held at the Garden Museum in London in 2011. He has also lectured in the UK and the USA. Stuart-Smith is a member of the Society of Garden Designers and the Landscape Institute.

More recently Tom Stuart-Smith has created the overall plan for the RHS Garden Bridgewater in Worsley in Salford, Greater Manchester, and a garden surrounding The Hepworth Wakefield in West Yorkshire, dedicated to the works of sculptor Barbara Hepworth.

He was listed in House & Garden in 2021 as one of the top 50 garden designers in the UK.

Stuart-Smith was appointed Officer of the Order of the British Empire (OBE) in the 2023 Birthday Honours for services to landscape design.

== Writing ==
Stuart-Smith has written articles for the Financial Times, Guardian and Telegraph on the subject of gardening and landscape design.

In 2011 he co-wrote and published a book titled The Barn Garden.
