= Holder in due course =

In commercial law, a holder in due course (HDC) is someone who takes a negotiable instrument in a value-for-value exchange without reason to doubt that the instrument will be paid. If the instrument is later found not to be payable as written, a holder in due course can enforce payment by the person who originated it and all previous holders, regardless of any competing claims those parties may have against each other. This right shields a holder in due course from the risk of taking instruments without full knowledge of their history.

== Rights ==
The rights of a holder in due course of a negotiable instrument are qualitatively, as matters of law, superior to those provided by ordinary species of contracts:

- The rights to payment are not subject to set-off, and do not rely on the validity of the underlying contract giving rise to the debt (for example if a cheque was drawn for payment for goods delivered but defective, the drawer is still liable on the cheque).
- No notice need be given to any party liable on the instrument for transfer of the rights under the instrument by negotiation. However, payment by the party liable to the person previously entitled to enforce the instrument "counts" as payment on the note until adequate notice has been received by the liable party that a different party is to receive payments.
- Transfer free of equities—the holder in due course can hold better title than the party he obtains it from (as in the instance of negotiation of the instrument from a mere holder to a holder in due course)
- Negotiation often enables the transferee to become the party to the contract through a contract assignment (provided for explicitly or by operation of law) and to enforce the contract in the transferee-assignee’s own name. Negotiation can be effected by endorsement and delivery (order instruments), or by delivery alone (bearer instruments). In addition, the rights and obligations accruing to the transferee can be affected by the rule of derivative title, which does not allow a property owner to transfer rights in a piece of property greater than his own.

== Limitations ==
The holder in due course rule can sometimes have highly inequitable effects on consumers.

The rule is particularly problematic in the consumer debt context where a business offers to finance a consumer purchase by accepting a promissory note signed by a consumer for part or all of the balance in lieu of tender of the full cash price, then sells the note to a bank (technically, by selling an assignment of its rights in the note) in order to immediately record a profit. The holder on due course rule allows banks to take an "empty head and pure heart" approach to buying loans, and to close their eyes to anything beyond the face of a promissory note when due diligence would reveal obvious irregularities in how that note was originated. The bank can still come after the consumer for the balance of the note even if the consumer did not get what they were promised, while the dishonest proprietor of a fly-by-night business who sells shoddy goods on unfavorable terms to a consumer can take the money and run. If the business has already closed and liquidated, the consumer may be left without recourse unless they can overcome the arduous barrier of piercing the corporate veil to reach the proprietor's personal assets. As long as the proprietor is careful to not cross the line from civil into criminal fraud—that is, the consumer technically did receive something from the transaction, rather than getting nothing at all—the proprietor is unlikely to face criminal prosecution for such misconduct.

In 1971, the U.S. Federal Trade Commission (FTC) began to study this issue and found "widespread evidence of abuse and injury" to American consumers. On November 14, 1975, the FTC promulgated Rule 433, formally known as the "Trade Regulation Rule Concerning Preservation of Consumers' Claims and Defenses", which "effectively abolished the [holder in due course] doctrine in consumer credit transactions". In 2012, the FTC reaffirmed the regulation. The effect of the so-called "FTC Holder Rule" is to make "the holder of a consumer credit contract, whether it be a loan company, a bank or other concern, responsible for honoring all the obligations of the merchant who originally sold the goods".

One limitation on the holder's liability in the text of the FTC Holder Rule is that "recovery hereunder by the debtor shall not exceed amounts paid by the debtor hereunder". In other words, the holder's liability to the debtor cannot exceed the amount of the debt actually paid by the debtor to the holder after the note was assigned. In 2022, the Supreme Court of California held that in California, this liability cap does not apply to costs and attorney's fees awarded to a prevailing plaintiff consumer under fee-shifting statutes which override the American rule.
