= Scott Baker (judge) =

English judge

Sir Thomas Scott Gillespie Baker, PC (born 10 December 1937) is a retired English Court of Appeal judge. Scott Baker is the eldest son of Sir George Baker, a former High Court judge who was President of the Family Division from 1971 to 1979. One of his brothers, Judge Michael Baker, KC, was the Resident judge at St Albans Crown Court.

== Education ==
Scott Baker was educated at Haileybury & Imperial Service College, and studied at Brasenose College, Oxford. He was a member of Chorleywood Urban District Council from 1964 to 1967. He married Margaret Joy Baker on 10 February 1973. The couple has two sons and one daughter.

== Career ==
He was called to the bar at the Middle Temple in 1961, and practised in a range of legal areas, including family finance cases, and professional negligence. He became a recorder in 1976, and was appointed a Queen's Counsel in 1978. He became a Bencher at Middle Temple in 1985. He was a member of the Committee that inquired into human fertilisation in 1982 to 1984, chaired by Mary Warnock, which led to the Human Fertilisation and Embryology Act 1990.

He was appointed as a High Court judge in 1988 (and was styled Mr Justice Scott Baker), receiving the customary knighthood, and allocated to the Family Division. He moved to the Queen's Bench Division in 1993.

He was Presiding Judge of the Wales and Chester Circuit from 1991 to 1995, and a member of the Parole Board from 1999 to 2002. He was the Lead Judge of the Administrative Court from 2000 to 2002. In 1999, he presided over the trial of Great Western Trains following the Southall rail crash in 1997.

He dismissed charges of corporate manslaughter, as there was no identifiable individual in the company who was also guilty of gross negligence, but levied a then-record fine for health and safety offences of £1.5m. His judgment was upheld on appeal. The same year, Baker presided at the trial of Jonathan Aitken on charges of perjury following the collapse of Aitken's libel suit against The Guardian.

Baker was promoted in 2002, becoming a Lord Justice of Appeal. He was Treasurer of his Inns of Court, the Middle Temple, in 2004. He sat as coroner for the inquests into the deaths of Princess Diana and Dodi Fayed from 2 October 2007 to 7 April 2008.

In March 2011, Baker was sworn in as a Justice of the Court of Appeal of Bermuda, a position that he held until 2018.

== Notable cases ==
- St Albans City and DC v International Computers Ltd (1994) - Baker delivered the first instance judgment regarding unfair contract terms and liability limitation in business to business contracts, whilst a portion of the case was overturned on appeal, the ratio and obiter delivered by Baker remains leading law in the area of sale of goods and limitation.
- R v Great Western Trains Co (1999) (Unreported) - Baker dismissed the case against Great Western, holding that it was a condition precedent for a guilty mind to be proven before charges of gross negligence manslaughter could be made out. The judgment was referred by the Attorney General to the Court of Appeal in Attorney General’s Reference No 2 of 1999.

== Sources ==
- The Court of Appeal - Judges from HM Court Service
- Biography from Oklahoma City University School of Law
- Announcement of appointment of new Deputy Coroner, Judicial Communications Office, 24 April 2007
- Official Archived website of the Inquests into the deaths of Diana, Princess of Wales and Dodi Fayed
- The Royal Gazette: New Court of Appeal judge sworn in
