= Supply of Goods and Services Act 1982 =

Act of the Parliament of the United Kingdom

Supply of Goods and Services Act 1982 (Note: Section 20(1).)
- Act of Parliament
- Parliament of the United Kingdom
- Long title: An Act to amend the law with respect to the terms to be implied in certain contracts for the transfer of the property in goods, in certain contracts for the hire of goods and in certain contracts for the supply of a service; and for connected purposes.
- Citation: 1982 c. 29
- Territorial extent: England and Wales; Scotland; (Note: Section 20(4).)

Dates
- Royal assent: 13 July 1982
- Commencement: 4 January 1983 (part I); 4 July 1983 (part II); (Note: Section 20(3)–(4). The Supply of Goods and Services Act 1982 (Commencement) Order 1982 (SI 1982/1770).)
Other legislation
| Amends | Supply of Goods (Implied Terms Act 1973); Unfair Contract Terms Act 1977 |
| Amended by | Sale and Supply of Goods Act 1994; Sale and Supply of Goods to Consumers Regulations 2002; Regulatory Reform (Trading Stamps) Order 2005; Law Reform (Miscellaneous Provisions) (Northern Ireland) Order 2005; Consumer Rights Act 2015 |

Status: Amended

Text of statute as originally enacted

Revised text of statute as amended

Text of the Supply of Goods and Services Act 1982 as in force today (including any amendments) within the United Kingdom, from legislation.gov.uk.

The Supply of Goods and Services Act 1982 (c. 29) is an act of the Parliament of the United Kingdom which requires traders to provide services to a proper standard of workmanship ("with reasonable care and skill"). Furthermore, if a definite completion date or a price has not been fixed then the work must be completed within a reasonable time and for a reasonable charge. The Act was partially superseded by the Consumer Rights Act 2015, insofar as that Act applies, i.e. between trader and consumers, for contracts entered into from 1 October 2015. The Supply of Goods and Services Act 1982, as amended, remains in force in England, Wales, Northern Ireland; only Part IA of the Act, which creates provisions analogous to Part I of the Act, and Part III, which deals with the Act's commencement etc., apply in Scotland.

== Overview ==
Parts I and IA (Scotland) relate to goods. Part II related to services. Part III is "supplementary".

The sections on goods apply to "relevant contracts for the transfer of goods", being those where one person agrees to transfer property in goods, i.e. ownership of the goods, to another person; the Act also applies to contracts for the hire of goods (sections 6 to 10A).

The Act does not, however, apply to any "excepted contract", which includes sales of goods (covered by the Sale of Goods Act 1979, for trader to trader contracts, and the Consumer Rights Act 2015, for trader to consumer contracts) and Hire Purchase Agreements.

When applicable, the Act implies terms into "relevant contracts for the transfer of goods" and "relevant contracts for the hire of goods".

== Contents ==
=== Goods ===
In relation to "relevant contracts for the transfer of goods", the Act implies the following terms:

==== Title ====
Section 2 prescribes an implied term regarding title (i.e. a legal right to transfer the property) and various implied warranties.

- The transferor must have the right to transfer the property in the goods, i.e. ownership unencumbered by any security, at the relevant time under the contract when transfer must be made.
- This applies unless the contract or the circumstances imply only the rights the transferor possess at the relevant time are due to be transferred; however it is also implied that the difference between unencumbered ownership and what is actually being transferred has been disclosed to the receiver.

==== Descriptions and samples ====
- If the transferor has agreed to transfer the property in the goods by description, it is implied by section 3 that the goods will match the description.
- If the transferor has agreed to transfer the property in the goods by sample, it is implied by section 5 that the bulk of the goods will match the sample.

==== Suitability ====
If the seller knows from the buyer the particular purpose for which the goods are being acquired, sections 4(4) and 4(5) create an implied term that "the goods supplied under the contract are reasonably fit for that purpose".

=== Services ===
Part II of the Act defines which types of contract are "relevant contract[s] for the supply of a service". The Act also states that a reasonable time (section 14(2)) and a reasonable charge (section 15(2)) are "questions of fact", but it does not explain how the "fact of reasonableness" is to be determined. However, the Unfair Contract Terms Act 1977 and its concomitant case law provided a number of guidelines.

== Case law ==
Trebor Bassett Holdings Ltd v ADT Fire and Security, 2012, involved a contract for ADT to "the design, supply, install and commission a fire detection and suppression system for a popcorn factory" in Pontefract owned and operated by Trebor Bassett and Cadbury. There was a fire in June 2005 which the installed system failed to extinguish. The court held that ADT were asked to design a system to meet Bassett's specific fire safety requirements and therefore they were providing a service, for which there was a requirement to take reasonable care, but the design and supply of such a system did not constitute a "supply of goods" for the purpose of Part 1 of the act. The section 4 requirement that "the goods supplied under the contract are reasonably fit for that purpose" was therefore not invoked by this contract.
