= Ādeśa =

Ādesha or Ādeśa (Sanskrit: आदेश) means 'an order', 'command' or 'advice', 'instruction', 'precept', 'rule'.

== Meaning ==
The word Ādesha appears to be a semantically polyvalent compound representing two homonymous compounds of different origin and formation; it was surmised that ādeśa- in the sense of "substitute" owes its origin to a combination of ā- and deśa-, whereas ādeśa- in the sense of "advice" belongs to the verb ā- diś- "to point out, to teach"; it is the combination of ā- meaning 'toward', and diś meaning 'to show or direct'.

== Grammatical usage ==
Nirvachanashastra is a hermeneutic device that is used for word-analysis and derivation. The proper understanding of the relation in nirvachana analysis between a noun and some activity, expressed by a finite verb or by mention of a verbal root came to the fore through the study of Yāska's Nirukta done in the light of a model of substitution according to which model adesha ('substitution') takes the sthana ('place') of the original sthanin ('place-holder') under the given circumstances. Sthana refers to artha ('meaning'), thus nirvachanas are merely place-holders in semantic space; one gets a different thought if one gets a different sentence to represent the same truth.

By using Ādeśa rather than vikāra, and holding on to varna-samāmnāya sound system, Pāṇini was able to achieve economy and brevity in the statements of algebraic system. With regard to the rule, requiring the substitution of soft unaspirate consonants in the place of hard consonants, the ādeśa that takes place in place of a vowel is not sthānvit. Panini uses ādeśa in the sense of 'substitution' and 'substitute'. Vadha is not an independent root in the Paninian system it is an adesa for the root han-

== Upanishadic usage ==
The Upanishads have given four Mahāvākyas or grand proclamations corresponding to four prescribed practices viz. Upadesha, Adesha, Abhyasa and Anubhava; accordingly the vakya – Tat Tvam Asi, appearing in the Chandogya Upanishad, is an Adesha Vakya, a command statement; the shishya or 'disciple' listens to the Upadesha vakya and the Adhesha vakya with full faith and devotion which act is called Sravana ('concentration').

In the Sanskrit phrase - अथात आदेशः नेति नेति athāta ādeśah: neti neti, meaning – 'now hence the teaching: not this, not this' of Brihadaranyaka UpanishadII.ii.6, Adesha means 'specific instruction' and not 'substitute'.

In the Taittiriya Upanishad(II.iii.1), in the very brief part reading - आदेश आत्मा, the word, Adesha, refers to the brahmana portion as the self ('trunk')when the sage says that the self constituted by mind is also of a human shape the shape the human shape the mental body takes after the human shape of the vital body. Sankara explains that the word, Ādeśah here means the brahmana portion of the Vedas, since (in consonance with the etymological meaning of ādeśa, command) the brahmana portion inculcates all that has to be enjoyed.

== Mercantile usage ==
Chanakya in his Arthashastra, refers to the then prevalent bill of exchange called Ādesha which was an order to a third person to pay up a sum of money on behalf of the sender of that order; in those days merchant guilds performed the functions of banks. There was considerable use of these instruments, including promissory notes, and merchants in large towns gave letters of credit to one another.

== Other usages ==
Aurobindo explains that the intellectual Asura determines his actions by his reason or ideal, the emotional Asura by his feelings; but the Shuddha determines them by the higher inspiration proceeding from the divine experience in the Vijanana, that is what people often call the Adesha.

Keshab Chandra Sen of Brahmo Samaj (and founder of Brahmo Samaj of India) influenced by Christian theology propounded the doctrine of Adesha, according to which God inspires knowledge in some individuals whose word must therefore be considered infallible and true which doctrine not accepted by some members witnessed division in ranks and the formation of Sadharan Brahmo Samaj.

In the Bhagavad Gita Sloka XVII.22, it is seen that the word अदेशकाले (ādeśkāle) with the dropping of a mātra i.e. ā to a (and thus providing negative connotation), refers to wrong time.
