= Bills of Exchange Act 1908 =

Act of Parliament in New Zealand

New Zealand Parliament
- Long title: An Act to consolidate certain Enactments of the General Assembly relating to bills of exchange.
- Citation: 1908 No. 15 (as amended)
- Territorial extent: Realm of New Zealand
- Royal assent: 4 August 1908

Amended by
- Statutes Amendment Act 1946; Cheques Act 1960; Bills of Exchange Amendment Act 1963; Bills of Exchange Amendment Act 1971; Bills of Exchange Amendment Act 1979; Credit Contracts Act 1981; Bills of Exchange Amendment Act 1995; Bills of Exchange Amendment Act 2002; Bills of Exchange Amendment Act 2016
- Status: Current legislation

The Bills of Exchange Act 1908 is an Act of the New Zealand Parliament which regulates bills of exchange and related promissory notes. It is based on the Imperial Bills of Exchange Act 1882 (UK). The Act also applies to the Realm of New Zealand, which includes the Cook Islands and Niue as well as New Zealand.

Sections 11 to 14 of the Statutes Amendment Act 1946, the Cheques Act 1960, the Bills of Exchange Amendment Act 1963, the Bills of Exchange Amendment Act 1971, the Bills of Exchange Amendment Act 1979, and the Bills of Exchange Amendment Act 1995, are deemed part of the Bills of Exchange Act 1908. (Note: The Statutes Amendment Act 1946, section 11; the Cheques Act 1960, section 1(1); the Bills of Exchange Amendment Act 1963, section 1; the Bills of Exchange Amendment Act 1971, section 1; the Bills of Exchange Amendment Act 1979, section 1(1); and the Bills of Exchange Amendment Act 1995, section 1.)

The Bills of Exchange Act 1908 consolidates the Bills of Exchange Act 1883, the Bills of Exchange Act 1883 Amendment Act 1884, and the Bills of Exchange Act Amendment Act 1905. (Note: The Bills of Exchange Act 1908, section 1(2) and First Schedule)

== Amendments ==
Sections 4(1) and (1A) were substituted for section 4(1) by section 3 of the Bills of Exchange Amendment Act 2002.

The proviso was substituted for sections 14(a)(i) and (ii) by section 13 of the Statutes Amendment Act 1946. Section 14(a) was substituted by section 3(1) of the Bills of Exchange Amendment Act 1979.

Section 30(2) was substituted by section 50 of the Credit Contracts Act 1981.

Section 40(2) was substituted by section 4(1) of the Bills of Exchange Amendment Act 1979.

Sections 41(1)(da) and (2)(fa) were inserted by section 5 of the Bills of Exchange Amendment Act 1979.

Section 75 was substituted by section 2 of the Bills of Exchange Amendment Act 1971.

Section 82 was repealed by section 8(1) of the Cheques Act 1960.

Section 96A was inserted by section 4 of the Bills of Exchange Amendment Act 2016.

Section 97 was repealed by section 2 of the Bills of Exchange Amendment Act 1963.

== Bibliography ==
- Bright, T. N (1962). Banking Law and Practice in New Zealand. Sweet & Maxwell. pp. 29, 46, 54, 57, 72, 82, 101, 120, 138, 167, 169, 177, 202, 209, 212, 217, 225, 237, 240, 358 and passim.
- Burnett, Robin; Bath, Vivienne (2009). Law of International Business in Australasia. Federation Press. ISBN 9781862877245.
- Corrin-Care, Jennifer (2015). South Pacific Contract Law. Taylor & Francis. ISBN 9781135340087.
- Northey and Leys. Commercial Law in New Zealand. Fifth Edition. Butterworths. Wellington. 1974. Pages 2, 43, 54, 157, 162, 170, 190, 218, 232, 364 to 409, 433 and passim.
- "Bills of Exchange Act 1908". New Zealand Contract and Commercial Legislation 2013. CCH New Zealand. 111 et seq.
- Australian and New Zealand Commentary on Halsbury's Laws of England (Fourth Edition). Butterworths. 1974. Title "Chapter Sixteen: Bills of Exchange and other Negotiable Instruments". Pages 12 to 14, 17, 18, 20, 26 and 28.
- Wily, H Jenner. The Abridgement of New Zealand Case Law. Butterworths. Wellington. 1963. Volume 1. Pages 10, 13 to 15, 18, 26, 27, 60 and passim.
- Butterworth's Current Law Digest 1979-1983. Butterworths. Wellington. 1984. Pages 34, 35, 114, 424 and passim. Paras 100 and 1482. Google.
- Collier and Lindsay. Powers of Attorney in Australia and New Zealand. Federation Press. 1992. Page 117.
- [2017] 15 New Zealand Yearbook of International Law 254.
- Ngyh. Conflict of Laws in Australia. Butterworths. 4th Edition. 1984. Pages 241, 246 and 262.
- Byles on Bills of Exchange. 25th Edition. 1983. Page 37.
- Ellinger's Modern Banking Law. Fifth Edition. Pages 409 and 480.
- Cranston, Avgouleas, van Zwieten, Hare and van Sante. Principles of Banking Law. Third Edition. Oxford University Press. Page 374.
