= Bills of Exchange (Ireland) Act 1828 =

Act of the Parliament of the United Kingdom

Bills of Exchange (Ireland) Act 1828 (Note: The citation of this act by this short title was authorised by section 1 of, and the first schedule to, the Short Titles Act 1896. Due to the repeal of those provisions it is now authorised by section 19(2) of the Interpretation Act 1978.)
- Act of Parliament
- Parliament of the United Kingdom
- Long title: An Act to repeal certain Acts, and to consolidate and amend the Laws relating to Bills of Exchange and Promissory Notes in Ireland.
- Citation: 9 Geo. 4. c. 24
- Territorial extent: United Kingdom

Dates
- Royal assent: 19 June 1828
- Commencement: 1 September 1828 (Note: Section 1.)
Other legislation
| Amends | See § Repealed enactments |
| Repeals/revokes | See § Repealed enactments |
| Amended by | Statute Law Revision Act 1873; Bills of Exchange Act 1882; Statute Law Revision (No. 2) Act 1888; Statute Law Revision Act 1890; Statute Law Revision Act 1891; Statute Law (Repeals) Act 1976 |

Status: Partially repealed

Text of statute as originally enacted

Revised text of statute as amended

Text of the Bills of Exchange (Ireland) Act 1828 as in force today (including any amendments) within the United Kingdom, from legislation.gov.uk.

The Bills of Exchange (Ireland) Act 1828 (9 Geo. 4. c. 24) is an act of the Parliament of the United Kingdom that consolidated and amended the law relating to bills of exchange and promissory notes in Ireland.

== Provisions ==
=== Repealed enactments ===
Section 1 of the act repealed 4 enactments, listed in that section. The repeal did not affect the operation of any of the repealed acts in so far as they repealed a former act or acts, or affect any actions or suits already commenced and prosecuted upon any of the repealed Acts.

| Citation | Short title | Description | Extent of repeal |
|---|---|---|---|
| 8 Anne c. 11 (I) | Inland Bills of Exchange and Promissory Notes Act 1709 | An Act for the Utter Payment of Inland Bills of Exchange, and making Promissory Notes more obligatory. | The whole act. |
| 26 Geo. 3 c. 17 (I) | Inland Bills of Exchange and Promissory Notes Act 1786 | To explain and amend the said Act of the Eighth Year of the Reign of Queen Anne. | The whole act. |
| 1 & 2 Geo. 4. c. 78 | Bills of Exchange Act 1821 | An Act to regulate Acceptance of Bills of Exchange. | So far as it relates to or is in force in Ireland. |
| 7 & 8 Geo. 4. c. 15 | Bills of Exchange, etc. Act 1827 | An Act for declaring the Law in relation to Bills of Exchange and Promissory Notes becoming payable on Good Friday or Christmas Day. | So far as it relates to or is in force in Ireland. |

== Subsequent developments ==
Sections 1 and 12 of the act were repealed by section 1 of, and the schedule to, the Statute Law Revision Act 1873 (36 & 37 Vict. c. 91), which came into force on 5 August 1873.

Sections 2, 4 and 7 to 11 were repealed by section 96 of, and schedule 2 to, the Bills of Exchange Act 1882 (45 & 46 Vict. c. 61), which came into force on 18 August 1882.

Sections 3 and 5 of the act were repealed by section 1 of, and the first schedule to, the Statute Law Revision Act 1891 (54 & 55 Vict. c. 67), which came into force on 5 August 1891.

Sections 15 and 16 were repealed by section 1 of, and part XI of schedule 1 to, the Statute Law Revision (Northern Ireland) Act 1976, which came into force on 13 April 1976.
