= St Albans City and DC v International Computers Ltd =

1996 English contract law case

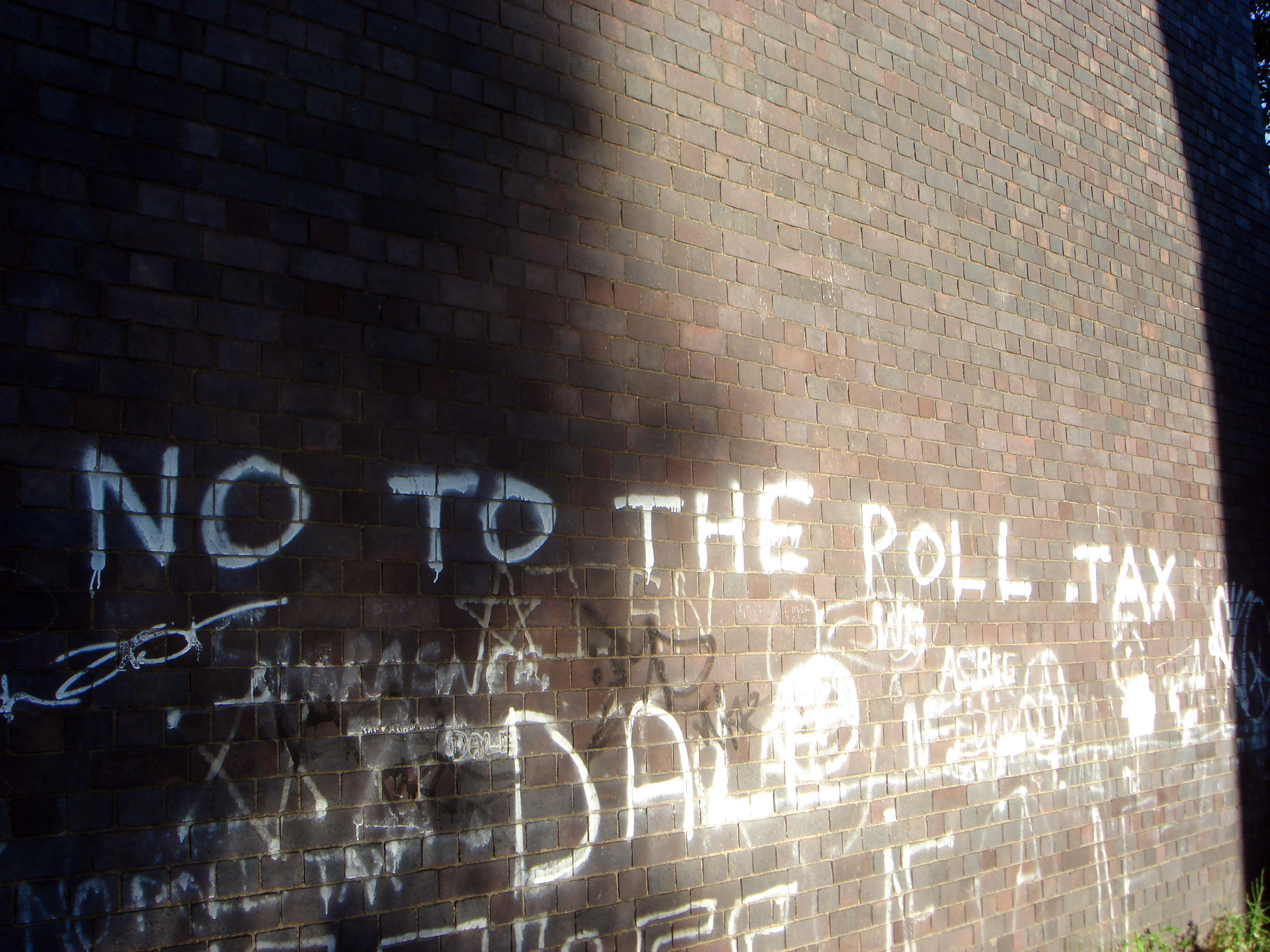
- IC Ltd made faulty software for the poll tax
- Court: Court of Appeal
- Citations: [1996] EWCA Civ 1296, [1996] 4 All ER 481

Case history
- Prior action: [1995] FSR 686

Case opinions
- Scott Baker

Keywords
- Unfair terms, bargaining power, poll tax

St Albans City and DC v International Computers Ltd [1996] EWCA Civ 1296 is an English contract law case, concerning unfair terms under the Unfair Contract Terms Act 1977. The parties were St Albans City and District Council and International Computers Limited.

== Facts ==
A contract to provide software (COMCIS) for the implementation of the Community Charge ("poll tax") of International Computers Ltd limited its liability to £100,000. The software was meant to create a register of tax payers. Because of errors in the software, the loss to the council was £1,313,846. The council claimed breach of contract, and that the liability limitation was unreasonable under the Unfair Contract Terms Act 1977. International Computers Ltd claimed that the liability limitation should remain.

== Judgment ==
Scott Baker awarded the full sum because the city council was operating on International Computers Ltd's written standard terms of business and so UCTA 1977 section 3 applied. Sections 6 or 7 also applied and under section 11 the clause was unreasonable. Under section 11(4) Baker highlighted that International Computers Ltd had ample resources and had £50m worldwide product liability insurance. Looking at schedule 2, he said that the council was in a weaker bargaining position because they had financial restraints and were not in the commercial field. They had no opportunities of other contracts without the term. The council knew of the term and made representations about it. He noted (as in The Flamar Pride) that schedule 2 should be taken into account just as with ss. 6–7. He summed up by saying that the loss of this size is better to fall on the company and not the local population through increased taxes or reduced services.

The Court of Appeal upheld Baker's reasoning, but concluded the damages were in fact £484,000 less.

== See also ==
- English contract law
- Unfair Contract Terms Act 1977
- Unfair Contract Terms Bill
- Interpreting contracts in English law
