= Stewart Gill Ltd v Horatio Myer & Co Ltd =

English contract law case

- Court: Court of Appeal
- Citations: [1992] EWCA 6, [1992] 1 QB 600

Court membership
- Judges sitting: Lord Donaldson MR; Stuart-Smith LJ; Fox LJ

Case opinions
- Lord Donaldson MR; Stuart-Smith LJ

Keywords
- Unfair terms

Stewart Gill Ltd v Horatio Myer & Co Ltd. [1992] EWCA 6 is an English contract law case relating to the Unfair Contract Terms Act 1977 (UCTA).

== Facts ==
Horatio Myer & Co Ltd was buying an overhead conveyor system from Stewart Gill Ltd. It was defective. Myer refused to pay the last 10% instalment. Gill sued. Myer sought to set off the amount it owed against other sums of money it was due to pay, which is a defence to an application for summary judgment. Gill argued that clause 12.4 of the conditions of sale applied, which said 'The customer shall not be entitled to withhold payment of any amount due to the company under the contract by reason of any payment credit set off counterclaim allegation of incorrect or defective goods or for any other reason whatsoever which the customer may allege excuses him from performing his obligations hereunder.' The first issue was whether the clause fell into UCTA 1977 and the second was whether it was unreasonable.

== Judgment ==
Lord Donaldson MR, noting there was "more than one way of killing a cat", held that clause 12.4 was within the scope of UCTA 1977 and it was unreasonable. He held that the purpose of section 13 was to stop precisely this variety of exemption clause: the 'no set off' provision in clause 12.4 had the same effect as an exemption clause because it purported to preclude a remedy for breach of contract, and was thus caught by section 13(1)(b) and in turn fell under UCTA 1977 section 3.

Stuart-Smith LJ held that 'but for' clause 12.4, Myer would have had a right to set off Gill's liability to it. Myer had an equitable right to set off Gill's claims against its claims against Gill. Therefore, clause 12.4 was excluding liability which Myer would have had. It was therefore ineffective under section 13(1)(b). Courts will assess the clause as a whole, not just the part alleged to be unreasonable. Section 11(1) reinforces this, that the relevant time is when the contract was made, not the time of breach.

== See also ==
- English contract law
