= Messr UK Ltd v Britvic Soft Drinks Ltd =

English contract law case

Britvic Soft Drinks Ltd v Messer UK Ltd
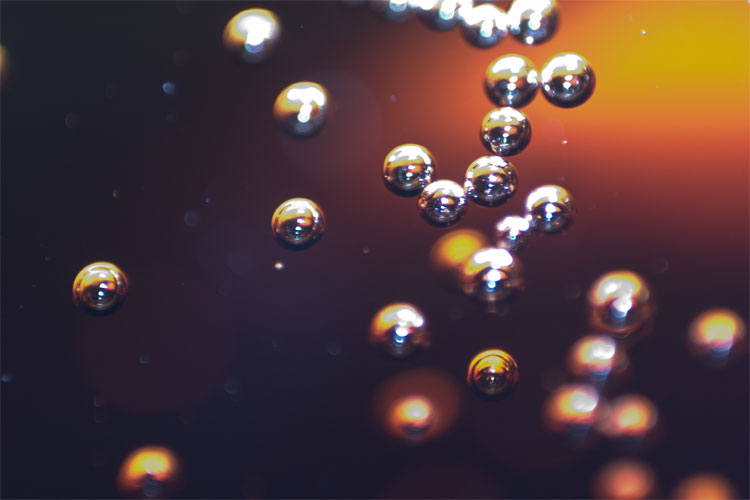
- Court: Court of Appeal
- Decided: 30 April 2002
- Citations: [2002] EWCA Civ 548; [2002] 2 All ER (Comm) 321; [2002] 2 Lloyd's Rep 368; Times, May 22, 2002
- Transcript: Full text of judgment

Case history
- Prior action: [2002] 1 Lloyd's Rep 20

Court membership
- Judges sitting: Thorpe LJ, Mance LJ and Neuberger J

Keywords
- Defective goods, unreasonable terms, satisfactory quality, unfair contract terms

Britvic Soft Drinks Ltd v Messer UK Ltd [2002] EWCA Civ 548 is a notable English contract law case, concerning the application of the Unfair Contract Terms Act 1977 in the context of consumer protection and a supply chain.

== Facts ==
Messer UK Ltd supplied Britvic with carbon dioxide for its drinks. The carbon dioxide was found to be contaminated with benzene, a carcinogen. Britvic was forced to recall its products and sued Messer to recover its costs, arguing that Messer was in breach of contract. A term in the contract limited liability of Messer under s 14 of the Sale of Goods Act 1979 (which by virtue of UCTA 1977 can only be limited as it satisfies the requirement of reasonableness).

The judge found that the only relevant express term in the supply agreement was that the carbon dioxide would conform with British Standard 4105. But the implied term under Sale of Goods Act 1979 s 14 also applied. Breach of both terms allowed the recovery of damages. Messer appealed, arguing that BS 4105 could not be regarded as containing an express term that gave rise to damages and that the term limiting s 14 did in fact satisfy the reasonableness test.

== Judgment ==
Mance LJ dismissed the appeal and held in favour of Britvic. The judge had in fact been wrong on the first point, that BS 4105 contained an express term relevant to benzene and giving rise to damages, because it could not be read as a general undertaking of suitability.

But the judge had been right that Messer's exclusion of liability for s 14 SGA 1979 was unreasonable. As a supplier, rather than manufacturer, this represented that it complied with BS 4105, the required purity level at the time. Although you could comply with BS 4105, this did not mean the carbon dioxide was suitable for use. The exclusion was unreasonable because it contradicted the assumption that manufacture and supply would exclude introduction of foreign elements. Buyers could not be expected to test for elements they had no reason to suspect. So it must be the responsibility of Messer, and ultimately the manufacturer. Mance LJ concluded as follows.

21 The judge accepted that the parties were to be regarded as having been of equal bargaining power - see paragraph (a) in Schedule 2 to the Act. There were other suppliers (Hydrogas and BOC) to which THP and Brothers could have gone. The judge also treated it as axiomatic for the purposes of paragraph (c) that "on the footing that the terms are applicable at all" the buyers "must be regarded as cognisant of their existence and effect". I am not satisfied that paragraph (c) can be quite so easily disposed of. Contractual incorporation may in some circumstances occur without a party either knowing, or being realistically in a position where he or it can be blamed for not knowing, of the extent of certain terms. Take someone contracting for the carriage of a parcel by rail or air on the carriers' standard conditions. No-one really expects him to obtain or read the terms. Nor do I think that paragraph (c) is to be necessarily even to be read as equating the positions of someone who actually knows and someone who "ought reasonably to have known" of the existence and extent of a term. It seems to me legitimate to consider and take into account the actual extent and quality of the knowledge of a party, however much he or it may, under ordinary contractual principles, have become contractually bound by the particular term(s).

22 Thus, in the case of Watford Electronics Ltd v Sanderson CFL Ltd [2001] EWCA Civ 317; [2001] 1 AER 696, cited to the judge and to us, the judge found as a relevant factor under paragraph (c) that the buyer of the relevant software was "aware of the existence of the term, only first learned of its existence towards the end of the pre-contract discussions, attempted unsuccessfully to have it substantially amended, only succeeded in achieving a make-weight amendment and learnt from Sanderson [the supplier] that a term excluding liability was standard software industry practice."

23 The Court of Appeal in Watford, in upholding the validity of an exclusion of liability for any "claims for indirect or consequential losses whether arising from negligence or otherwise", regarded that as a most material factor, as appears from the judgment given by Chadwick LJ (with which Buckley J agreed) at paragraphs 54(vii) and 56 and that of Peter Gibson LJ at paragraph 62(4). In the present case, the commercial and contractual background were significantly different. The manufacture of carbon dioxide so as to exclude benzene does not compare with the provision of software (an exercise notoriously liable to give rise to problems). No-one would have contemplated that the manufacturing process would allow benzene in, or (despite clause 11. 2) that the buyers (THP and Brothers) would test for benzene, or indeed for compliance with BS 4105, which Messer anyway warranted. The parties did not discuss or negotiate with regard to the specific provisions of the contract, clauses 11.1 and 11.2 in particular. Clauses 11.1 and 11.2 were simply incorporated as part of Messer's standard provisions. Although this is not a consideration specifically identified in Schedule 2, it seems to me that it can be relevant under paragraph (c) and anyway as a general consideration under s. 11(2) (cf also by analogy s. 3(1)).

24 Messer's basic contention, as the judge recognised, was and is that it was reasonable for it as a supplier (but not a manufacturer) to limit its liability to compliance of the carbon dioxide supplied with BS 4105, on the basis that this represented the contemporary understanding of the required purity. The judge in rejecting this said:

"I suspect that if the parties had been asked when they were contracting on whom should lie the risk of a breakdown in the manufacturing process permitting the unexpected introduction into the CO_{2} of a redundant carcinogen in quantities which, whilst not injurious to health would render products made using that CO_{2} unsaleable, they would have unhesitatingly replied that of course that risk should be borne by the supplier...... In my judgment it is wholly unreasonable for the supplier of a bulk commodity such as CO_{2} for a food application to seek to exclude liability for the commodity not being of satisfactory quality or being unfit for its purpose where that has come about as a result of a breakdown in the manufacturing process allowing the inadvertent introduction of a redundant carcinogen."

25 Messer submits that the judge was in this first sentence posing the wrong question. He was taking advantage of hindsight, and his knowledge of what had actually happened and its consequences, instead of asking whether the term was a fair and reasonable one to be included having regard to the circumstances which were, or ought reasonably to have been, known to or in the contemplation of the parties when the contract was made.

26 In my judgment, however, the judge was entirely justified in rejecting Messer's submission that it was reasonable for it as a supplier (and not a manufacturer) to limit its liability to compliance of the carbon dioxide supplied with BS 4105, on the basis that this represented "the contemporary understanding" of the required purity. The authors of BS 4105 were concerned to regulate the quantities of and methods of testing for elements which carbon dioxide might be expected to contain. They did not identify or regulate other elements, not because the contemporary understanding was that carbon dioxide might contain them, but because the presence of an extraneous or deleterious substance such as benzene or strychnine was wholly unexpected, and could only occur due to some manufacturing or other mishap. If one asks whether it was reasonable to limit Messer's liability to compliance with BS 4105, the answer seems to me, therefore, to be that it ought to have been appreciated that compliance with BS 4105 would not, by itself, necessarily mean that the carbon dioxide supplied was suitable for use. BS 4105 assumed that the process of manufacture and supply would exclude the introduction of other extraneous elements, and so did not actually address such elements. Clauses 11.1 and 11.2 are thus unreasonable, because they contradict a fundamental assumption that all parties would have made in this respect. Since it is accepted that there was no basis on which the buyers, THP and Brothers, could have been expected to test for extraneous components which they had no reason to consider could be present, and since their presence could only arise from some mishap in manufacture or supply, responsibility should rest on the supplier, Messer, who would be expected to be able to pass it on, where appropriate to the manufacturer, Terra (as it can in fact in the present proceedings).

Thorpe LJ and Neuberger J concurred.

== See also ==
- Consumer Protection Act 1987
