= Right to repeat performance =

The right to repeat performance is a consumer right of remedy created under section 55 of the UK Consumer Rights Act 2015, which provides for a new right for a consumer to require a trader to perform a service again, if the trader is in breach of the agreed services contract or its implied terms, or to perform again such part of the service as is necessary in order to conform with the contract.

This right was created alongside a right to price reduction. The right to repeat performance takes priority unless performance cannot be repeated. A trader in breach of a services contract is obliged to repeat its performance within a reasonable time and without significant inconvenience to the consumer, and to bear any necessary costs in doing so.

It is possible to agree a contract which excludes the possibility of repeat performance.

This part of the Consumer Rights Act came into effect on 1 October 2015.

In debate in the House of Commons' Public Bill Committee, an amendment was proposed by Stella Creasy MP, shadow minister for Business, Innovation and Skills:

"Where the quality of provision of services has been deemed to be hazardous or so poor as to cause the consumer to reasonably lose confidence in the trader’s ability to provide services which they would wish to purchase, the consumer may refuse a repeat performance and exercise their right to price reduction...."

This amendment was withdrawn on assurances that existing common law and statutory remedies provide protection for consumers from traders who would unnecessarily endanger their personal safety, and especially that consumers would not be obliged to allow them back into their homes ever again if they do not feel happy with that.
