= Commerzbank AG v Keen =

United Kingdom labour law case

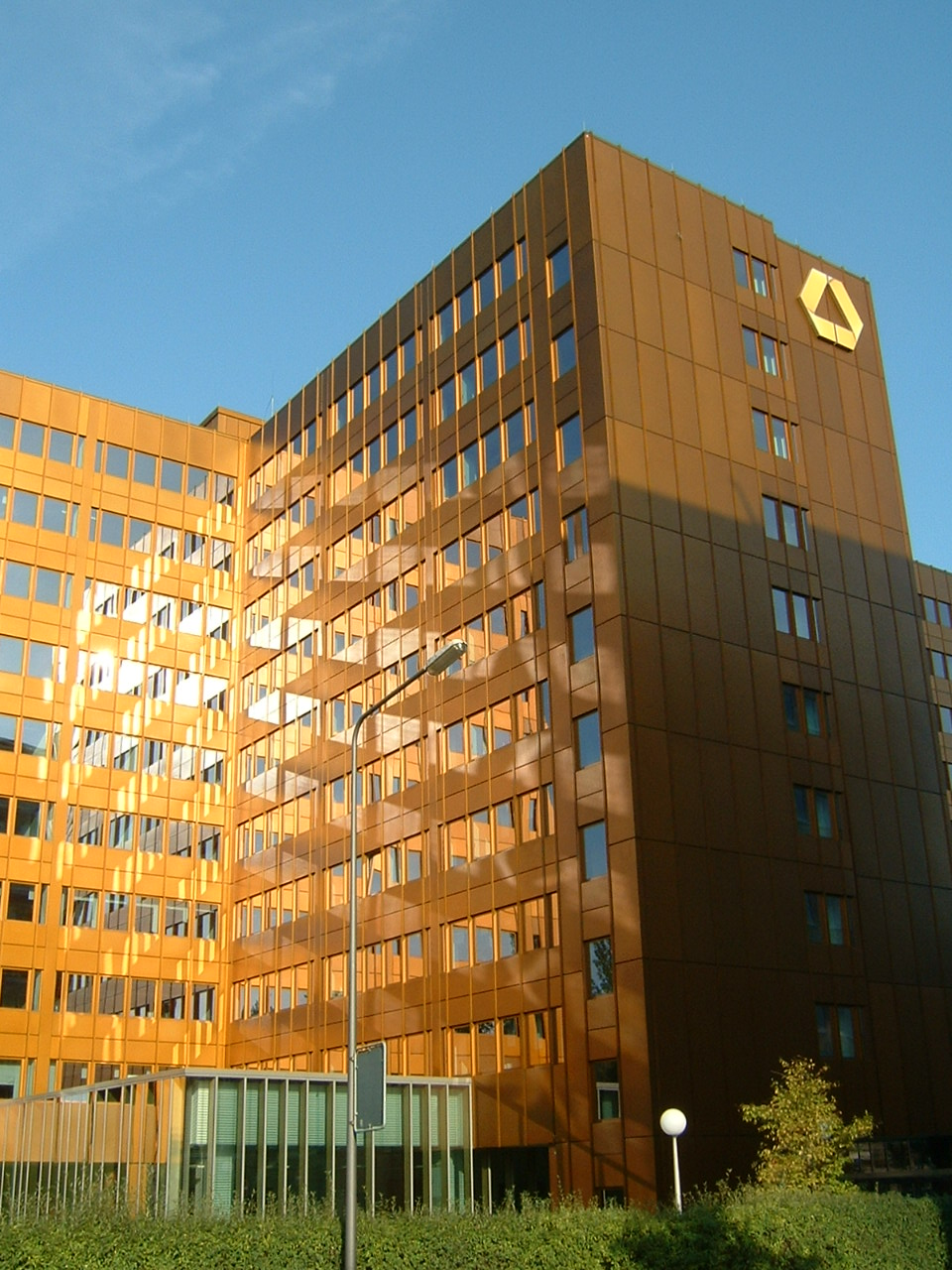
- Court: Court of Appeal
- Citations: [2007] IRLR 132; [2006] 2 CLC 844; [2006] EWCA Civ 1536; [2007] ICR 623

Case opinions
- Mummery LJ, Moses LJ

Keywords
- Contract of employment, terms

Commerzbank AG v Keen [2006] EWCA Civ 1536 is a UK labour law case, concerning the construction of terms in a contract of employment.

== Facts ==
Mr Keen managed the proprietary trading desk in Commerzbank AG, paid a basic salary of £120,000. The bonus was awarded at the bank’s discretion, and was not payable if the employee was no longer working or on notice to leave. For each of 2003 and 2004 Mr Keen received almost €3m, paid the following March. The desk was closed in May 2005, he stopped work and was made redundant in June. He got no bonus, and so claimed there was a breach of contract to not exercise the bank’s discretion irrationally or perversely. The decision to give a bonus for 2003 and 2004, but not 2005 was irrational. The contractual provision the bank relied on was, in any event, contrary to the Unfair Contract Terms Act 1977 section 3.

Morison J held there was an arguable case. Commerzbank AG appealed.

== Judgment ==
Mummery LJ held that the burden was high to show that exercise of discretion was perverse. There was a lack of independent evidence about the size of the bonus pools in 2003 and 2004, and the bank did have a wide contractual discretion, so the decision to award the bonuses before was not irrational. An employee could reasonably be regarded as a ‘consumer’ under the Unfair Contract Terms Act 1977 if the employer supplied him with services or goods for consumption. He was not within the natural meaning of ‘consumer’. But the issue about section 3 did not involve this. The bonus did not come within the ‘standard terms of business’ of banking. It was a term of remuneration of some employees, so there was no real prospect of success.

Jacob LJ concurred.

Moses LJ gave concurring reasons.

== See also ==
- United Kingdom labour law
