= Murray Stuart-Smith =

English judge (1927–2025)

The Right Honourable Sir Murray Stuart-Smith KCMG

Lord Justice of Appeal
- In office 1987–2000
- Monarch: Elizabeth II

Personal details
- Born: 18 November 1927
- Died: 21 January 2025 (aged 97)

Sir Murray Stuart-Smith, KCMG, PC (18 November 1927 – 21 January 2025) was an English barrister and Appeal Court judge. His 1997 re-examination of Lord Taylor's report into the Hillsborough disaster is seen today as a "debacle".

== Early life ==
Stuart-Smith was educated at Radley College and at Corpus Christi College, Cambridge.

Stuart-Smith was called to the bar by Gray's Inn in 1952 and was made a Bencher 1978. He was appointed Queen's Counsel in 1970, and as judge of the High Court of Justice (Queen's Bench Division) in 1981. He was appointed to the Court of Appeal in 1987, and retired in 2000. He later served as President of the Court of Appeal of Gibraltar from 2007, and as Justice of the Court of Appeal of Bermuda from 2004.

== Hillsborough Report ==
In retirement Sir Murray was appointed to re-examine Lord Taylor's report into the Hillsborough disaster, together with the wider question of whether the inquest process had been satisfactory. Sir Murray broadly concluded that there were no problems with the way that the inquiry had been handled. Lord Falconer later stated "I am absolutely sure that Sir Murray Stuart-Smith came completely to the wrong conclusion". Falconer added: "It made the families in the Hillsborough disaster feel after one establishment cover-up, here was another."

There was massive criticism of the Stuart-Smith inquiry, including outrage after the judge quipped during a meeting with families: “Have you got a few of your people or are they like the Liverpool fans, turn up at the last minute?”

Criminologist Professor Phil Scraton has remained highly critical of the Stuart-Smith scrutiny, describing it as a "debacle". Speaking in October 2012, Scraton said the findings of the Hillsborough Independent Panel – which disclosed that 41 of the 96 who died had the potential to survive had there been a more effective response to the emergency – showed "just how wrong he (LJ Stuart-Smith) was."

== Later career ==
Stuart-Smith served as the President of the Gibraltarian Court of Appeal. In the 2012 Birthday Honours he was appointed a Knight Commander of the Order of St Michael and St George (KCMG) for services to justice in Gibraltar.

== Judgments ==
Notable judicial decisions of Stuart-Smith include:

- Johnstone v Bloomsbury HA [1992] QB 333, [1991] 2 WLR 1362, [1991] 2 All ER 293, an English contract law case, concerning implied terms and unfair terms under the Unfair Contract Terms Act 1977.
- Midland Bank plc v Cooke [1995] 4 All ER 562, constructive trusts.
- Smith v Lloyds TSB Group plc [2001] QB 541, liability of a bank on a forged cheque.
- Stewart Gill Ltd v Horatio Myer & Co Ltd [1992] EWCA 6, another case on the Unfair Contract Terms Act 1977.
- Re Selectmove Ltd [1993] EWCA Civ 8, part payments of debt.
- Barry v Davies (Trading As Heathcote Ball & Co) [2000] 1 WLR 1962, CA

== Personal life and death ==
Sir Murray was the father of Jeremy Stuart-Smith, also an Appeal Court judge, and the landscape architect and garden designer Tom Stuart-Smith.

Stuart-Smith died on 21 January 2025, at the age of 97.

== Arms ==
Coat of arms of Murray Stuart-Smith

Notes
Displayed on a painted panel at Gray's Inn.
Crest
A unicorn’s head erased Argent gorged with a collar counter-compony Or and Azure and charged on the neck with a crescent Sable.
Escutcheon
Azure on a bend Argent cotised engrailed Or a thistle proper between two unicorns’ heads erased Sable.
