= Consumer Rights Act 2015 =

Act of the Parliament of the United Kingdom

Consumer Rights Act 2015 (Note: Section 101.)
- Act of Parliament
- Parliament of the United Kingdom
- Long title: An Act to amend the law relating to the rights of consumers and protection of their interests; to make provision about investigatory powers for enforcing the regulation of traders; to make provision about private actions in competition law and the Competition Appeal Tribunal; and for connected purposes.
- Citation: 2015 c. 15
- Introduced by: Jo Swinson (Commons); Viscount Younger of Leckie (Lords)
- Territorial extent: England and Wales; Scotland; Northern Ireland; (Note: Section 99.)

Dates
- Royal assent: 26 March 2015
- Commencement: Various (Note: Section 100.)
Other legislation
Amends	Registered Designs Act 1949; Misrepresentation Act 1967; Supply of Goods (Implied Terms) Act 1973; Hallmarking Act 1973; Unfair Contract Terms Act 1977; Sale of Goods Act 1979; Supply of Goods and Services Act 1982; Courts and Legal Services Act 1990; Sunday Trading Act 1994; Arbitration Act 1996; Fireworks Act 2003; Christmas Day (Trading) Act 2004; Legal Services Act 2007
Amended by	Digital Economy Act 2017; Digital Markets, Competition and Consumers Act 2024; Automated Vehicles Act 2024; Renters' Rights Act 2025

Status: Amended

History of passage through Parliament

Text of statute as originally enacted

Revised text of statute as amended

The Consumer Rights Act 2015 (c. 15) is an act of the Parliament of the United Kingdom which consolidates existing consumer protection law legislation and also gives consumers a number of new rights and remedies. Provisions for secondary ticketing and lettings came into force on 27 May 2015, and provisions for alternative dispute resolution (ADR) came into force on 9 July 2015 as per the EU Directive on consumer ADR. Most other provisions came into force on 1 October 2015.

In respect of contracts under which a trader provides goods or services to a consumer, the act replaces the Sale of Goods Act 1979, Unfair Terms in Consumer Contracts Regulations 1999 and the Supply of Goods and Services Act 1982, making some changes to rights to return faulty goods for refund, replacement or repair, and adding new rights on the purchase of digital content.

The Act is split into three parts:

- Part 1 concerns consumer contracts for goods, digital content and services.
- Part 2 concerns unfair terms.
- Part 3 concerns other provisions across a broad range of topics.

== Background ==
The act was introduced to Parliament by Jo Swinson MP, then parliamentary under-Secretary in the Department of Business, Innovation and Skills, on 23 January 2014 with the aim of consolidating and updating consumer protection law and to thereby provide a "modern framework of consumer rights."

Among the pieces of legislation that have been combined into the Consumer Rights Act, the most notable are the Unfair Terms in Consumer Contracts Regulations 1999 and the consumer law elements of:

- Unfair Contract Terms Act 1977
- Sale of Goods Act 1979
- Supply of Goods and Services Act 1982.

== Definitions ==
Section 2 lays out the key definitions pertinent to the Act:

- A 'consumer' is "an individual acting for purposes that are wholly or mainly outside that individual's trade, business, craft or profession." This extends beyond any previous definition in UK or EU law as it includes contracts that are entered into for a combination of personal and business reasons. It excludes somebody acting on behalf of their business but on somebody else's standard terms.
- A 'trader' is defined as "a person acting for purposes relating to that person's trade, business, craft or profession, whether acting personally or through another person acting in the trader's name or on the trader's behalf."
- 'Business' is taken to include "the activities of any government department or local or public authority."
- 'Goods' are "any tangible moveable items, but that includes water, gas and electricity if and only if they are put up for supply in a limited volume or set quantity."
- 'Digital content' means "data which are produced and supplied in digital form".

== Part 1 ==
=== Goods ===
The Act requires goods to be:

- Of satisfactory quality.
- Fit for the consumer's particular purpose.
- As described.

Previously, defective goods had to be rejected within a 'reasonable period', but the Act now gives consumers a minimum of 30 days in which they can reject goods that fail to conform to the contract. After that period, the consumer has varying rights including the right to repair or replacement, at the seller's election.

=== Digital content ===
The addition of a chapter covering digital content is considered one of the "most significant" changes in the Act. Digital content includes not only content that is supplied for a price, but also freemium software. The requirements are identical to those which apply to goods, stated above. The main difference is that there is no right to reject digital content, but rather the remedies include the right to repair or replacement, the right to a price reduction and the right to a refund. The trader is now liable for damage caused to a device by supplied digital content where they fail to exercise reasonable care and skill. Consumers may also pursue other traditional remedies such as damages and specific performance.

=== Services ===
Services provided by traders must be performed with "reasonable care and skill", and "within a reasonable time".

The Act also ensures that any statement a trader makes when a consumer is either deciding to enter into the contract or making a decision about the service after entering into the contract is now a binding contractual term. Previously such terms may only have given rise to an action in the tort of misrepresentation but now a claim may be brought for breach of contract. This means that a claimant's case will generally be easier to prove and expectation damages may be awarded rather than compensation based on the principle of restitutio ad integrum.

On top of the usual remedies consumers now also have the right to repeat performance or (as a fall-back) to a price reduction of an appropriate amount.

== Part 2 ==
=== Unfair terms ===
The definition of an 'unfair term' remains the same as that originally outlined in the Unfair Contract Terms Act 1977; i.e. a term is unfair if, "contrary to the requirement of good faith, it causes a significant imbalance in the parties' rights and obligations under the contract to the detriment of the consumer." However, terms that express the main subject matter of the contract are not subject to this fairness test, provided that such terms are both transparent and prominent in the contract.

The Act also adds to the so-called 'grey list' that lists a non-exhaustive range of terms which are, in most cases, likely to be considered unfair by the courts. These include:

- Extortionate charges when a consumer decides to cancel a contract.
- Allowing the trader to make decisions about the characteristics of the subject matter after the contract had been concluded.
- Giving the trader a mandate to vary the price after the consumer is already bound.

Section 71, reflecting existing European Union case law, places a duty on the court to consider the fairness of contractual terms, if there is enough information to make this feasible, even where none of the parties raises the issue. The relevant cases heard by the European Court of Justice are case C-168/05 (Mostaza Claro, 2006), case C-243/08 (Pannon 2009), and case C-137/08 (VB Penzugyi v Schneider, 2010).

== Part 3 ==
=== Competition law ===
Schedule 8 amends the Competition Act 1998 and greatly expands the jurisdiction of the Competition Appeal Tribunal, to the extent that it now has similar powers to the High Court. The Act also now provides for collective proceedings, a form of class action, on an 'opt-out' basis on top of the present 'opt-in' system. There is also now a statutory scheme of voluntary redress in competition law, a form of ADR.

=== Duty of letting agents to publicise fees ===
Letting agents are under a duty to display a list of fees in each of their offices in a prominent position. Such a list must include:

- A description of each fee.
- Whether the fee relates to each dwelling-house or each tenant under a tenancy of the dwelling-house.
- The amount of each fee.

The notice must also indicate that the agent is part of a redress scheme, and give its name.

=== Secondary ticketing ===
Anyone reselling tickets for an event must give the following information:

- The seat (or standing area) that the ticket is for.
- Any restrictions on the type of person who may use the ticket (e.g. age restrictions etc.).
- The face value of the ticket.

The event organiser may not cancel a ticket or blacklist a seller for reselling the ticket unless this right is contained within the original terms of the ticket.

== Impact and reception ==
The official position is that it was hoped that by consolidating existing legislation the new Act would simplify consumer protection law for both consumers and businesses. Also, the government predicted that the Act would "boost the economy by £4 billion" over the course of the following decade.

== See also ==
- Legislation.gov.uk
- Consumer protection in the United Kingdom
- Office of Fair Trading
- Standard form contract
- Unfair Terms in Consumer Contracts Regulations 1999
- Unfair Contract Terms Act 1977
- Sale of Goods Act 1979
- Supply of Goods and Services Act 1982
- Unfair Terms in Consumer Contracts Regulations 1999
- Repair café
