= Board of Inland Revenue v Haddock =

Fictitious legal case

The case of the negotiable cow, collected in Uncommon Law

Board of Inland Revenue v Haddock (also known as the negotiable cow) is a fictitious legal case written by the humorist A. P. Herbert for Punch magazine as part of his series of Misleading Cases in the Common Law. It was first published in book form in More Misleading Cases in the Common Law (Methuen, 1930). The case evolved into an urban legend.

== Summary of the case ==
The case involved a Mr Albert Haddock, often an ingenious litigant in Herbert's writing. In this case, Haddock had been in disagreement with the Collector of Taxes over the size of his tax bill. Haddock complained that the sum was excessive, particularly in view of the inadequate consideration he believed that he received from that Government in service. Eventually the Collector demanded £57 and 10 shillings.

Haddock appeared at the offices of the Collector of Taxes and delivered a white cow "of malevolent aspect". On the cow was stencilled in red ink:

To the London and Literary Bank, Limited
Pay the Collector of Taxes, who is no gentleman, or Order, the sum of fifty seven pounds £57/0/0 (and may he rot!)
ALBERT HADDOCK

Haddock tendered the cow in payment of his bill and demanded a receipt.

During the hearing, the fictitious judge, Sir Basil String, enquired whether stamp duty had been paid. The prosecutor, Sir Joshua Hoot KC confirmed that a two-penny stamp was affixed to the dexter horn of the cow. The collector declined the cow, objecting that it would be impossible to pay it into a bank account. Haddock suggested that he endorse the cow to a third party to whom he might owe money, adding that "there must be many persons in that position".

Sir Joshua informed the court that the collector did try to endorse the cheque on its back, in this case on the abdomen. However, Sir Joshua explained: "[t]he cow ... appeared to resent endorsement and adopted a menacing posture."

The collector abandoned the attempt and declined to take the cheque. Haddock led the cow away and was arrested in Trafalgar Square for causing an obstruction, leading to the co-joined criminal case, R v Haddock.

He testified that he had tendered a cheque in payment of income tax. A cheque was only an order to a bank to pay money to the person in possession of the cheque or a person named on the cheque, and there was nothing in law to say it must be on paper of specified dimensions. A cheque, he argued, could be written on notepaper. He said he had "drawn cheques on the backs of menus, on napkins, on handkerchiefs, on the labels of wine bottles; all these cheques had been duly honoured by his bank and passed through the Bankers' Clearing House". He thought that there was no distinction in law between a cheque on a napkin and a cheque on a cow.

When asked as to motive, he said he had not a piece of paper to hand. Horses and other animals used to be seen frequently in the streets of London. He admitted on cross-examination that he may have had in his mind an idea to ridicule the taxman. "But why not? There is no law against ridiculing the income tax."

In relation to the criminal prosecution, Haddock said it was a nice thing if in the heart of the commercial capital of the world a man could not convey a negotiable instrument down the street without being arrested. If a disturbance was caused by a crowd, the policeman should arrest the crowd, not him.

The judge, sympathetic to Haddock, found in his favour on the tax claim and prosecution for causing a disturbance. By tendering and being refused the cow, the other parties were estopped from then demanding it later.

== Television adaptation ==
Board of Inland Revenue v. Haddock was dramatised for BBC television as "The Negotiable Cow" as the opening of the first series of A. P. Herbert's Misleading Cases in 1967, with Roy Dotrice as Albert Haddock and Alastair Sim as Mr Justice Swallow.

== Citations ==
Although the case is fictitious, it has been referred to in judicial decisions.

In Messing v Bank of America (2002) at paragraph 1 the Maryland Court of Appeals observed: "The circumstances which gave rise to the case before us are, in terms of its genesis, reminiscent of those described in the case of Board of Inland Revenue v. Haddock."

In the English case of Victor Chandeler International Ltd v The Commissioners of Custom and Excise and Teletext Limited [1999] EWHC 214 (Ch) Mr Justice Lightman stated that a document, in the context of the Betting and Gaming Duties Act 1981, "must be inanimate: neither a person nor A. P. Herbert's 'negotiable cow' can constitute a document."

The now defunct Memphis Press-Scimitar (formerly published by the E. W. Scripps Company) published an article on the case in 1967, assuming it to have been factual. This was reported in the introduction to a later edition of Uncommon Law.

== Comparable real life cases ==
Negotiable instruments and other legal documents have been written on unusual surfaces. Documented cases provide illustrations of wills on the side of empty egg-shells, and cheques being written on a variety of strange surfaces.

An often-cited example is a Canadian farmer who, while trapped under his own tractor, carved a holographic will into the tractor's fender. The fender was probated and stood as his will, and is currently on display at the law library of the University of Saskatchewan College of Law.

In Jewish law a get can be written on any durable material, including the horn of a cow. If the horn is still attached to the cow, the husband must give the wife the whole cow.

== Similar fictional cases ==
Another A. P. Herbert "misleading case" concerns "The egg of exchange". The question there was whether a cheque written on an egg could be paid into a bank, given the risk of the egg breaking or going bad. It was suggested that the cheque could be boiled.

Yet another "misleading case", also Inland Revenue v Haddock, was cited in a debate in the House of Lords on 14 July 2004. In this, Mr. Haddock successfully argued that, during a period when judges had their salaries reduced by 30% because of financial emergency, they could not hear cases relating to the Inland Revenue because they had a personal interest in the outcome.
