= Delaware Mansions Ltd v City of Westminster =

Delaware v. City of Westminster
- Court: House of Lords
- Full case name: Delaware Mansions Limited and Others v. Lord Mayor and Citizens of The City of Westminster
- Decided: 25 October 2001
- Citation: [2001] UKHL 55

Court membership
- Judges sitting: Lord Cooke of Thorndon; Lord Steyn; Lord Browne-Wilkinson; Lord Hutton

Delaware v. City of Westminster ([2001] UKHL 55) is an English court ruling on nuisance, addressing the question of liability for repairing damage caused by tree roots. The court upheld a ruling of the Court of Appeal, stating that if a defendant knew about a continuing nuisance (in this case, cracking caused by tree roots), and had been given notice and opportunity to deal with it but failed to do so, then a claimant was entitled to receive costs for removing the nuisance themselves. It is a leading case in the Law of Nuisance, Trees and Forestry.

Delaware was the last case in which Lord Cooke of Thorndon sat as a Lord of Appeal in Ordinary.

== Background ==
The freehold owners of the Delaware Mansions, a block of flats in Delaware Road, Maida Vale (at 51.526224°N 0.190482°W), had received complaints of cracking in the building in 1989. An engineer's inspection that winter concluded that this was due to the roots of a large London plane tree outside the building, and recommended it be removed; if it could not be removed, then the foundations would need underpinning. A second report a year later made the same conclusions, with more urgency. Eventually, in October 1991, Westminster Council - the owners of the tree - cut back the roots, and through January–July 1992 Flecksun - the freeholders - carried out a program of structural underpinning to stabilise the building. The total costs to Flecksun came to just over £570,000, and they sued Westminster, as owners of the tree, for compensation.

The issue was complicated by the fact that, until June 1990 - just before Westminster was first notified of the damage - the freehold to the estate was owned by the Church Commissioners; the sale did not contain any mention of the right to legal action for nuisances. Westminster contended that if they were liable, then Flecksun could only sue for "fresh" damages caused by the tree after the transfer; only the Commissioners could sue for the existing damage.

The case was initially heard by the Official Referees' Court, where Recorder Derek Wood QC dismissed Flecksun's claim (as well as that of Delaware Holdings, their parent company). Flecksun took the case to the Court of Appeal, where a panel of judges (Beldam, Pill, and Thorpe LLJ) granted the appeal, allowing Flecksun to claim the £570,000 damages along with a further £265,000 in interest. Westminster appealed, sending the case to the House of Lords. The case has been discussed extensively by Jason W. Neyers in his paper "Lord Cooke of Thorndon's Final Appeal."
