= Jason W. Neyers =

Canadian legal scholar

- Born: 1973 (age 52–53)

Academic background
- Education: University of Western Ontario

Academic work
- Discipline: Canadian tort law

Jason W. Neyers is a Canadian legal scholar and professor at the University of Western Ontario.

== Background ==
Jason Neyers was born in Cambridge, Ontario in 1973. Neyers received his Bachelor of Arts and Bachelor of Laws at the University of Western Ontario and a Master of Studies at the University of Oxford. Neyers' works discuss Canadian tort law, private law, and contract law.

== Bibliography ==
Per OCLC WorldCat.

=== Books ===
- Understanding Unjust Enrichment - ISBN 9781841134239
- Exploring Contract Law - ISBN 9781841139067
- Emerging Issues in Tort Law - ISBN 9781841137070
- Tort Law: Challenging Orthodoxy - ISBN 9781472561527

=== Articles ===
- Cases and Materials on Contracts, 6th ed (Toronto: Emond Montgomery, 2018).
- “Reconceptualising the Tort of Public Nuisance” [2017] Cambridge Law Journal 87.
- “Tate & Lyle, Pure Economic Loss and The Modern Tort of Public Nuisance” (2016) 53 Alberta Law Review 1031 (with A Botterell).
- “Loss of Custom and Public Nuisance: The Authority of Ricket” (2016) Lloyd’s Maritime and Commercial Law Quarterly 135 (with E Andrews).
- “Causing Loss by Unlawful Means: Should the High Court of Australia follow OBG Ltd v Allan?” in S Degeling, J Edelman & J Goudkamp eds, Torts in Commercial Law (Sydney, Thomson Reuters, 2012)
- “What (is) a Nuisance?” (2011) 90 Canadian Bar Review 215.
- “The Economic Torts as Corrective Justice” (2009) 17 Torts Law Journal 162.
- “Rights-Based Justifications for the Tort of Unlawful Interference with Economic Relations” (2008) 28 Legal Studies 215.
- “Explaining the Principled Exception to Privity of Contract” (2007) 52 McGill Law Journal 757

== See also ==
- Delaware Mansions Ltd v City of Westminster
