= Smith v Lloyds TSB Group plc =

- Court: Court of Appeal
- Full case name: Smith v Lloyds TSB Group plc, Harvey Jones Ltd v Woolwich plc
- Decided: 27 July 2000
- Citation: [2001] QB 541

Court membership
- Judges sitting: Pill LJ, Potter LJ, Sir Murray Stuart-Smith

Case opinions
- Decision by: Pill LJ

Keywords
- cheque, bills of exchange, conversion

Smith v Lloyds TSB Group plc [2001] QB 541 was a decision of the Court of Appeal relating to the liability of a bank where it makes payment upon a fraudulently altered cheque. The case was a co-joined appeal from one High Court action (by Blofeld J, reported at [2000] 1 WLR 1225) and a County Court action (by Judge Hallgarten QC).

== Facts ==
The claimants in each case were respectively the owners of a non-negotiable cheque and the payee of a banker's draft which were stolen from the claimants and fraudulently and materially altered by the deletion of the original payee's name and the insertion of the name of a third party. The altered instruments were presented to the collecting bank, paid into an account in the name of the third party and cleared. In the first action, the claimants sued the collecting bank in conversion for the face value of the cheque and in the second action, the claimants sued the paying bank in conversion for the face value of the banker's draft. The banks conceded that they had converted the pieces of paper, but denied liability for the face value of the instruments on the ground that by virtue of section 64(1) of the Bills of Exchange Act 1882 (45 & 46 Vict. c. 61) the materially altered cheque or draft was avoided and therefore worthless in their hands.

== Judgment ==
The principal judgment was delivered by Pill LJ.

He held that the effect of the word "avoided" in section 64 of the Bills of Exchange Act 1882 (45 & 46 Vict. c. 61) was that, subject to the qualifications therein, a cheque or banker's draft which had been materially altered by the fraud of a third party was no longer a cheque or draft representing a chose in action but a worthless piece of paper, and no action for damages in conversion for its face value could therefore be brought by a party, such as the claimants, who, but for the material alteration, would have had contractual rights based upon it. Moreover, in the first action, by presenting the materially altered and therefore invalid cheque under normal banking arrangements, the collecting bank was not asserting its validity and accordingly the consequence of invalidity could not be avoided by alleging an estoppel.

The core propositions were summarised by Alan L. Tyree as follows:

- "the word "avoided" in section 64 meant that a materially altered cheque is, subject to the qualifications in section 64, a worthless piece of paper;
- "as such, the damages in an action for conversion are nominal;
- "the collecting bank is not estopped from asserting that the cheque was worthless;
- "the drawer of the cheque is effectively "protected" since the paying bank cannot debit the account for the amount paid; and
- "the fact that the holder may have had a right to a replacement was not relevant to the value of the paper."

== Commentary ==
Ellinger's Modern Banking Law accepts the case as authority for the proposition stated without comment.

== Notes ==
The decision is consistent with judicial authority in both Canada and in Australia.
