= Midland Bank plc v Cooke =

- Court: Court of Appeal
- Full case name: Midland Bank plc v Graham Edward Cooke and Jane Marie Cooke
- Decided: 7 July 1995
- Citations: [1995] EWCA Civ 12 [1995] 4 All ER 562 (1995) 27 HLR 733
- Transcript: HTML Version of Judgment at bailii.org

Case history
- Prior action: Appellant wife awarded 6% before HHJ Hamilton sitting on appeal in the Bedford County Court as Administrative Court
- Subsequent action: none

Case opinions
- Held: A. In a case where the bride's parents were paying for the wedding and reception and the bridegroom's parents were providing a contribution to the purchase price of the matrimonial home, it would not only be sensible to draw the inference that the bridegroom's parents intended to make a present to them both. B. The court is not bound to deal with the matter on the strict basis of the trust resulting from the cash contribution to the purchase price, and is free to attribute to the parties an intention to share the beneficial interest in some different proportions. C.Positive evidence that the parties neither discussed nor intended any agreement as to the proportions of their beneficial interest does not preclude the court, on general equitable principles, from inferring one.
- Decision by: Waite LJ
- Concurrence: Schiemann LJ; Stuart-Smith LJ

Keywords
- Constructive trust; resulting trust; sole ownership of cohabited family home; secured business loan against family home; undue influence; wedding gifts and costs being equally shared

Midland Bank plc v Cooke [1995] is an English land law case, concerning constructive trusts; and at first instance (never appealed) proven undue influence in law as to a secured business loan and later refinance.

First, it clarified the law as to wedding gifts.

Second, it held that so long as some financial contribution, however, small can be identified as going to the purchase of a home, the court may quantify that contribution in a greater amount than initially given. It opted for a 50:50 division looking at both spouses' conduct in the round.

Third, it clarified that if proven the spouses had never discussed any details of joint ownership, where one spouse legally owns the whole family home then the court often should from equitable principles infer agreement as to proportions of their beneficial interests.

== Facts ==
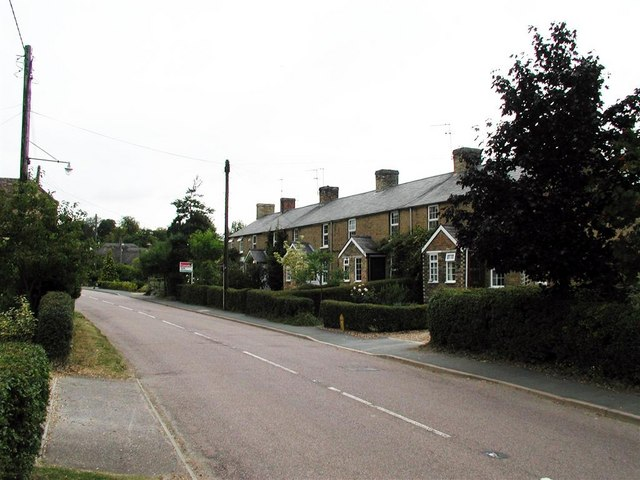
The street of the family home.

Mr Cooke paid £8,500 at age 19 for the house the month before he was married. He achieved this through a mortgage loan from a bank, his own savings, and a pre-wedding gift from his parents of £1,100. Mrs Cooke's parents paid for the wedding. The Cookes replaced that mortgage with one from Midland Bank plc to secure Mr Cooke's business overdraft. Mrs Cooke signed a consent form for her interest to be postponed to the bank's security. The property was put into Mr Cooke's name as sole legal owner. Midland Bank plc now demanded repayment of £52,000 and sought possession. Mrs Cooke argued her signature was obtained by undue influence. (Mrs Cooke admitted at trial that the married couple had never discussed any beneficial entitlement.)

The judge held the bank knew of Mr Cooke's undue influence and that she had an equitable interest given that the wedding gift was partly hers. The bank did not (cross-)appeal on this finding. The bank cross-appealed by alleging that Mrs Cooke had a 0% interest. The judge assessed her interest as 6% of the property, and Mrs Cooke appealed arguing for a 50% interest.

== Judgment ==
The Court of Appeal held that the gift was made to the couple jointly (50:50). This was proof of a common intention to have a beneficial interest. But in quantifying her interest the financial contribution was not the only thing which mattered: the whole course of dealing did. On the facts it was clear that the presumed intention was that she should have an equal share of the beneficial interest. Waite LJ observed that people usually will not talk about legal entitlements to property when young and embarking on a relationship, and says that should not leave them ‘beyond the pale of equity’s assistance’. The parties shared everything equally, including ‘the upbringing of their children.’ He continued as follows.

B... the duty of the judge is to undertake a survey of the whole course of dealing between the parties relevant to their ownership and occupation of the property and their sharing of its burdens and advantages… Only if that search proves inconclusive does the court fall back on the maxim that ‘equality is equity’.’

[...]

C... For a couple embarking on a serious relationship, discussion of the terms to apply at parting is almost a contradiction of the shared hopes that have brought them together. There will inevitably be numerous couples, married or unmarried, who have no discussion about ownership and who, perhaps advisedly, make no agreement about it. It would be anomalous, against that background, to create a range of home-buyers who were beyond the pale of equity's assistance in formulating a fair presumed basis for the sharing of beneficial title, simply because they had been honest enough to admit that they never gave ownership a thought or reached any agreement about it.

Stuart-Smith LJ and Schiemann LJ concurred.

== See also ==
- English land law
- English property law
