= R v Grantham =

1984 High Court case on UK insolvency law

- Court: High Court
- Citation: [1984] QB 675

Court membership
- Judges sitting: Lord Lane CJ, Boreham J and Stuart-Smith J

Keywords
- Fraudulent trading

R v Grantham [1984] QB 675 is a UK insolvency law case which decides that an intent to defraud, now under the Insolvency Act 1986 section 213, needs to be established for a conviction for fraudulent trading, and knowing that there was no prospect of being able to pay debt when they fell due, even if there might be a distant prospect in the future, constituted an intent to defraud.

== Facts ==
Mr Grantham was tried for fraudulent trading, contrary to the Companies Act 1948 section 332(3) (now Insolvency Act 1986 section 213). The jury were directed that they could find dishonesty and intent to defraud if they thought Mr Grantham obtained credit when he knew there was no good reason for thinking that his company would be able to repay the debt when it became due.

Mr Grantham was convicted. He appealed that the jury was given the wrong direction.

== Judgment ==
Lord Lane CJ, Boreham J and Stuart-Smith J dismissed Mr Grantham's appeal. They held there was no error in the direction. Applying the House of Lords case Welham v DPP [1961] AC 103, under section 332 (now section 213, Insolvency Act 1986) an intent to defraud was established on proof of intention to dishonestly prejudice creditors in being repaid.

== Significance ==
In a previous case from 1960, Re White & Osmond (Parkstone) Ltd Buckley J held that 'there is nothing to say that directors who genuinely believe that the clouds will roll away and the sunshine of prosperity will shine upon them again and disperse the fog of their depression are not entitled to incur credit to help them get over the bad time.' But this approach, allowing directors to keep incurring losses when they knew a company was unable to meet debts was disapproved by R v Grantham. If a director knew there was no short term prospect of repaying debts, it was irrelevant that he thought there may some hypothetical day be "blue skies" ahead.

== See also ==
- Re Augustus Barnett & Son Ltd [1986] BCLC 170
