= Negotiable instrument =

Contract document exchangeable for money

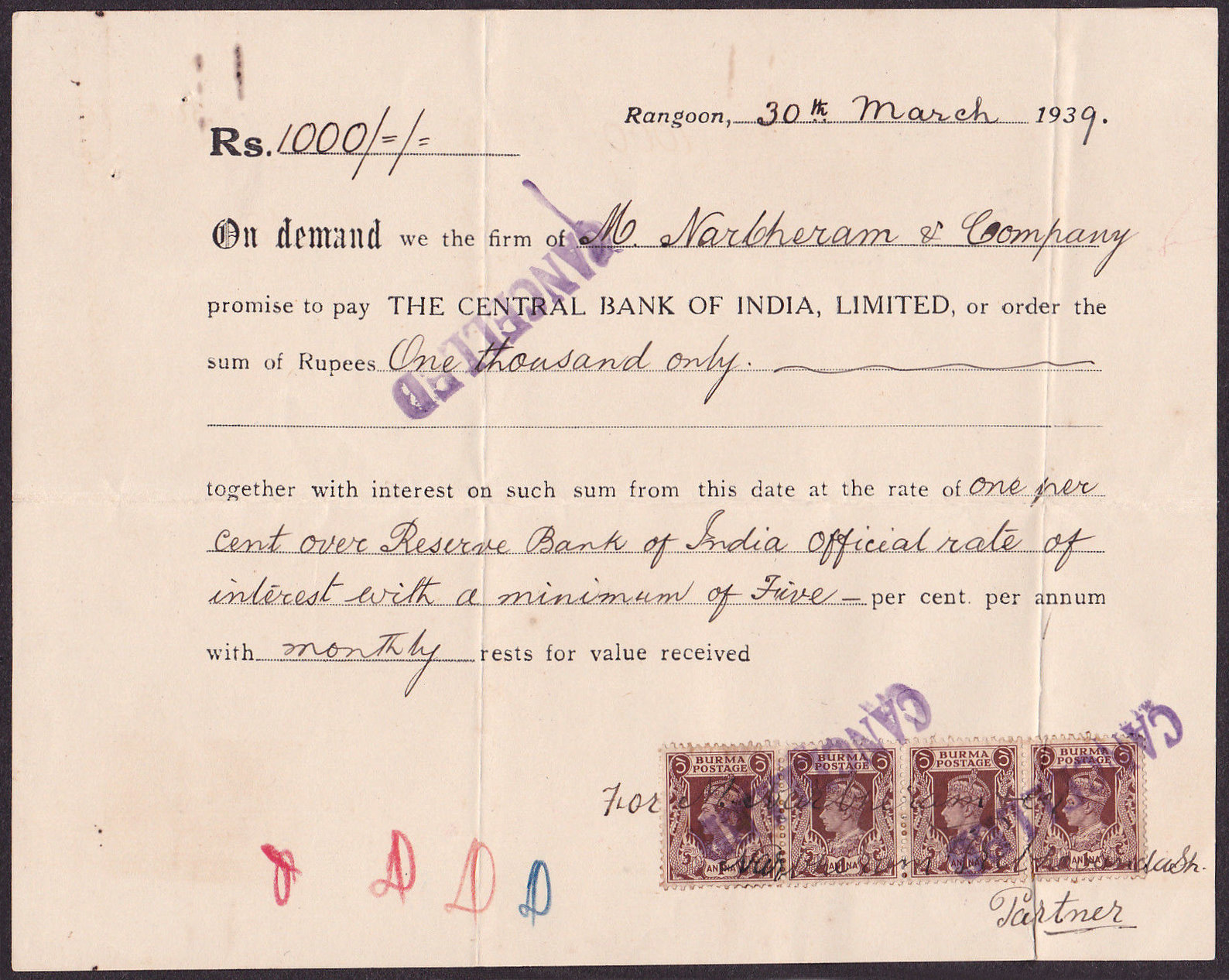
A 1939 promissory note, Rangoon, Burma

A negotiable instrument is a document guaranteeing the payment of a specific amount of money, either on demand, or at a set time, whose payer is usually named on the document. More specifically, it is a document contemplated by or consisting of a contract, which promises the payment of money without condition, which may be paid either on demand or at a future date. The term has different meanings, depending on its use in the application of different laws and depending on countries and contexts. The word "negotiable" refers to transferability, and "instrument" refers to a document giving legal effect by the virtue of the law.

== Concept of negotiability ==
William Searle Holdsworth defines the concept of negotiability as follows:

1. Negotiable instruments are transferable under the following circumstances: they are transferable by delivery where they are made payable to the bearer, they are transferable by delivery and endorsement where they are made payable to order.
2. Consideration is presumed.
3. The transferee acquires a good title, even though the transferor had a defective or no title.

== Jurisdictions ==
In the Commonwealth of Nations almost all jurisdictions have codified the law relating to negotiable instruments in a Bills of Exchange Act, e.g. Bills of Exchange Act 1882 in the UK, Bills of Exchange Act 1890 in Canada, Bills of Exchange Act 1908 in New Zealand, Bills of Exchange Act 1909 in Australia, the Negotiable Instruments Act, 1881 in India and the Bills of Exchange Act 1914 in Mauritius.

Additionally most Commonwealth jurisdictions have separate Cheques Acts providing for additional protections for bankers collecting unendorsed or irregularly endorsed cheques, providing that cheques that are crossed and marked 'not negotiable' or similar are not transferable, and providing for electronic presentation of cheques in inter-bank cheque clearing systems.

== History ==
In India, during the Mauryan period in the 3rd century BC, an instrument called adesha was in use, which was an order on a banker desiring him to pay the money of the note to a third person, which corresponds to the definition of a bill of exchange as we understand it today.

The ancient Romans are believed to have used an early form of cheque known as praescriptiones in the 1st century BC and 2,000-year-old Roman promissory notes have been found.

Common prototypes of bills of exchanges and promissory notes originated in China, where special instruments called fey tsien which were used to safely transfer money over long distances during the reign of the Tang dynasty in the 8th century.

In about 1150 the Knights Templar issued an early form of bank notes to departing pilgrims in exchange for a deposit of valuables at a local Templar preceptory in a European country, which could be cashed by the pilgrim concerned on arrival in the Holy Land, by presenting the note to a Templar preceptory there.

In the mid-13th century, the Ilkhanid rulers of Persia printed the "cha" or "chap" which was used as paper money for limited use for transactions between the court and the merchants for about three years before it collapsed. The collapse was caused by the court accepting the "cha" only at progressive discount.

Later, such documents were used for money transfer by Middle Eastern merchants, who had used the prototypes of bills of exchange ("suftadja" or "softa") from the 8th century to present. Such prototypes came to be used later by the Iberian and Italian merchants in the 12th century. In Italy in the 13–15th centuries, bills of exchange and promissory notes obtained their main features, while further phases of their development have been associated with France (16–18th centuries, where the endorsement had appeared) and Germany (19th century, formalization of Exchange Law). The first mention of the use of bills of exchange in English statutes dates from 1381, under Richard II; the statute mandates the use of such instruments in England, and prohibits the future export of gold and silver specie, in any form, to settle foreign commercial transactions. English exchange law was different than continental European law because of different legal systems; the English system was adopted later in the United States.

In England, two of the main reasons why the use of negotiable instruments became so popular was:

1. Carrying large amounts of coins from one place to the other was unsafe, so the usage of negotiable instruments was to prevent merchants from being robbed of their coins either on land or by sea.
2. During the 1300s, there was an increase in the use of counterfeit English money, so the aim of the English Crown was to eradicate the exchange of genuine English coins for such forgeries as well as foreign goods. As such, statutes such as the Statute of Money of 1335 (9 Edw. 3 Stat. 2) and 1379 were implemented to prevent the importation of counterfeit money, and also to prevent the exportation of valuable items like gold and silver in the absence of any special licenses.

The modern emphasis on negotiability may also be traced to Lord Mansfield. Germanic Lombard documents may also have some elements of negotiability.

== Distinguished from other types of contracts ==
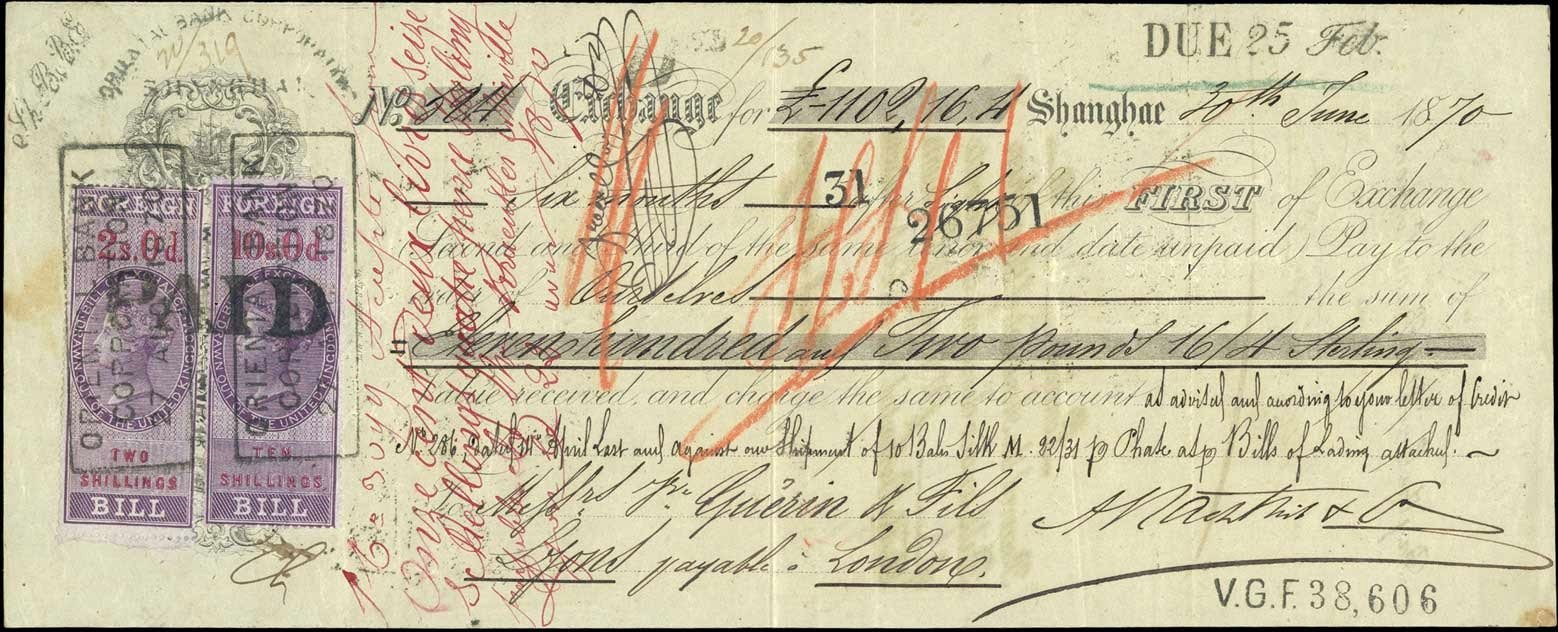
An 1870 bill of exchange payable in London, with British Foreign Bill revenue stamps attached

A negotiable instrument can serve to convey value constituting at least part of the performance of a contract, albeit perhaps not obvious in contract formation, in terms inherent in and arising from the requisite offer and acceptance and conveyance of consideration. The underlying contract contemplates the right to hold the instrument as, and to negotiate the instrument to, a holder in due course, the payment on which is at least part of the performance of the contract to which the negotiable instrument is linked. The instrument, memorializing: (1) the power to demand payment; and, (2) the right to be paid, can move, for example, in the instance of a "bearer instrument", wherein the possession of the document itself attributes and ascribes the right to payment. Certain exceptions exist, such as instances of loss or theft of the instrument, wherein the possessor of the note may be a holder, but not necessarily a holder in due course. Negotiation requires a valid endorsement of the negotiable instrument.

The consideration constituted by a negotiable instrument is cognizable as the value given up to acquire it (benefit) and the consequent loss of value (detriment) to the prior holder; thus, no separate consideration is required to support an accompanying contract assignment. The instrument itself is understood as memorializing the right for, and power to demand, payment, and an obligation for payment evidenced by the instrument itself with possession as a holder in due course being the touchstone for the right to, and power to demand, payment. In some instances, the negotiable instrument can serve as the writing memorializing a contract, thus satisfying any applicable statute of frauds as to that contract.

=== The holder in due course ===
The rights of a holder in due course of a negotiable instrument are qualitatively, as matters of law, superior to those provided by ordinary species of contracts:

- The rights to payment are not subject to set-off, and do not rely on the validity of the underlying contract giving rise to the debt (for example if a cheque was drawn for payment for goods delivered but defective, the drawer is still liable on the cheque)
- No notice need be given to any party liable on the instrument for transfer of the rights under the instrument by negotiation. However, payment by the party liable to the person previously entitled to enforce the instrument "counts" as payment on the note until adequate notice has been received by the liable party that a different party is to receive payments from then on. [U.C.C. §3-602(b)]
- Transfer free of equities—the holder in due course can hold better title than the party he obtains it from (as in the instance of negotiation of the instrument from a mere holder to a holder in due course)

Negotiation often enables the transferee to become the party to the contract through a contract assignment (provided for explicitly or by operation of law) and to enforce the contract in the transferee-assignee's own name. Negotiation can be effected by endorsement and delivery (order instruments), or by delivery alone (bearer instruments).

== Classes ==
Promissory notes and bills of exchange are two primary types of negotiable instruments. The following chart shows the main differences:

	Bill of exchange	Promissory note
Name	The name of the bill or note in the text of the document, in the language in which the document has been issued	
Subject	Unconditional order for the payment of the specified sum	Unconditional assumption of obligation for the payment of the specified sum
Drawee	The name of the person obliged to pay (drawee)	N/A
Date	The specification of the maturity	
Place of payment	Specification of the place of payment	
Payee	The name of the person to whose behalf the payment must be effected	
Issue date	The specification of the date and place of the issuance of the bill or note	
Signature	The signature of the drawer	The signature of the issuer

=== Promissory note ===
Although possibly non-negotiable, a promissory note may be a negotiable instrument if it is an unconditional promise in writing made by one person to another, signed by the maker, engaging to pay on demand to the payee, or at fixed or determinable future time, a sum certain in money, to order or to bearer. The law applicable to the specific instrument will determine whether it is a negotiable instrument or a non-negotiable instrument.

Bank notes are frequently referred to as promissory notes, a promissory note made by a bank and payable to bearer on demand. According to section 4 of India's Negotiable Instruments Act, 1881, "a Promissory Note is a writing (not being a bank note or currency note), containing an unconditional undertaking, signed by the maker to pay a certain sum of money only to or to the order of a certain person or the bearer of the instrument".

=== Bill of exchange ===
A bill of exchange or "draft" is a written order by the drawer to the drawee to pay money to the payee. A common type of bill of exchange is the cheque (check in American English), defined as a bill of exchange drawn on a banker and payable on demand. Bills of exchange are used primarily in international trade, and are written orders by one person to his bank to pay the bearer a specific sum on a specific date. Prior to the advent of paper currency, bills of exchange were a common means of exchange. They are not used as often today.

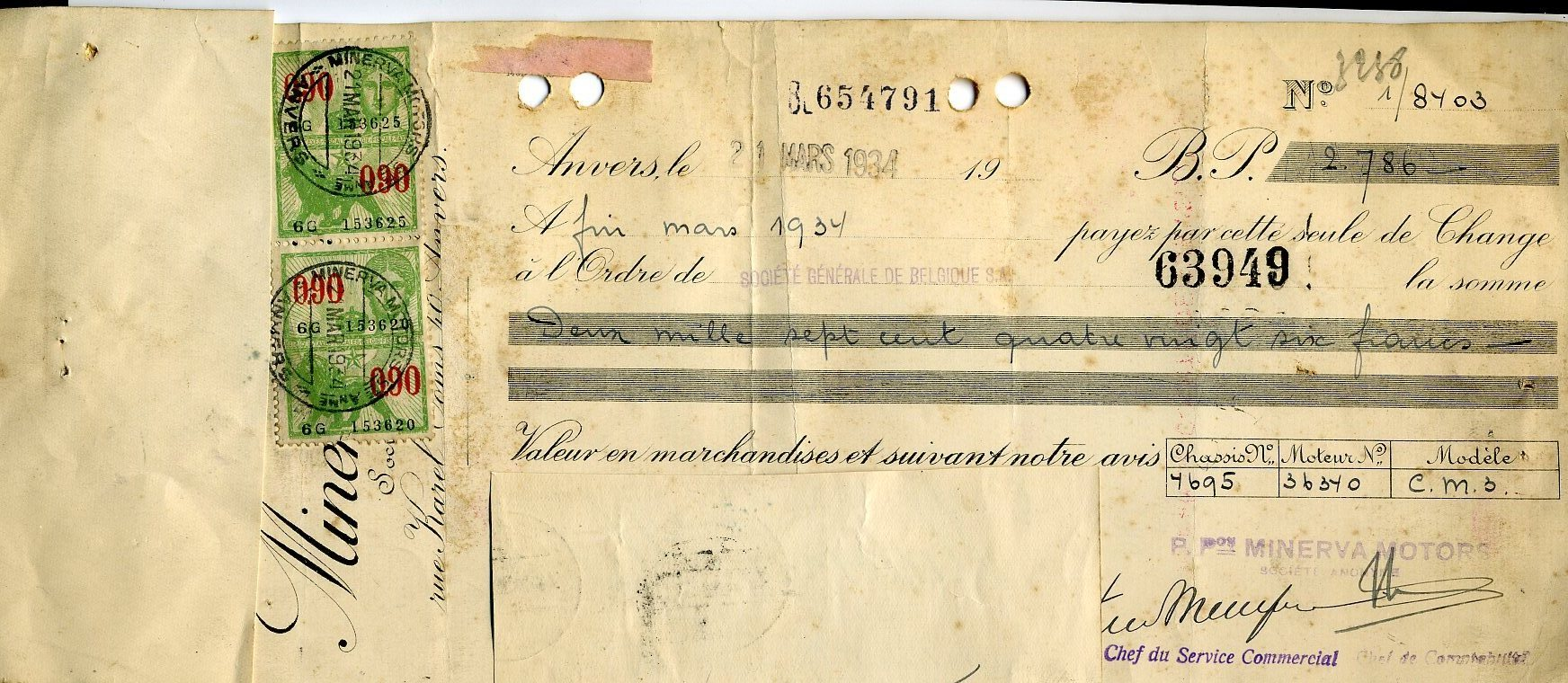
Belgian bill of exchange, 1933

A bill of exchange is essentially an order made by one person to another to pay money to a third person. A bill of exchange requires in its inception three parties—the drawer, the drawee, and the payee. The person who draws the bill is called the drawer. He gives the order to pay money to the third party. The party upon whom the bill is drawn is called the drawee. He is the person to whom the bill is addressed and who is ordered to pay. He becomes an acceptor when he indicates his willingness to pay the bill. The party in whose favor the bill is drawn or is payable is called the payee. The parties need not all be distinct persons. Thus, the drawer may draw on himself payable to his own order. A bill of exchange may be endorsed by the payee in favour of a third party, who may in turn endorse it to a fourth, and so on indefinitely. The "holder in due course" may claim the amount of the bill against the drawee and all previous endorsers, regardless of any counterclaims that may have disabled the previous payee or endorser from doing so. This is what is meant by saying that a bill is negotiable. In some cases a bill is marked "not negotiable"—see crossing of cheques. In that case it can still be transferred to a third party, but the third party can have no better right than the transferor.

== In the United States ==
In the United States, Articles 3 and 4 of the Uniform Commercial Code (UCC) govern the issuance and transfer of negotiable instruments, unless the instruments are governed by Article 8 of the UCC. The various state law enactments of UCC §§ 3–104(a) through (d) set forth the legal definition of what is and what is not a negotiable instrument:

§ 3–104. NEGOTIABLE INSTRUMENT.

(a) Except as provided in subsections (c) and (d), "negotiable instrument" means an unconditional promise or order to pay a fixed amount of money, with or without interest or other charges described in the promise or order, if it: (1) is payable to bearer or to order at the time it is issued or first comes into possession of a holder; (2) is payable on demand or at a definite time; and (3) does not state any other undertaking or instruction by the person promising or ordering payment to do any act in addition to the payment of money, but the promise or order may contain (i) an undertaking or power to give, maintain, or protect collateral to secure payment, (ii) an authorization or power to the holder to confess judgment or realize on or dispose of collateral, or (iii) a waiver of the benefit of any law intended for the advantage or protection of an obligor. (b) "Instrument" means a negotiable instrument. (c) An order that meets all of the requirements of subsection (a), except paragraph (1), and otherwise falls within the definition of "check" in subsection (f) is a negotiable instrument and a check.

(d) A promise or order other than a check is not an instrument if, at the time it is issued or first comes into possession of a holder, it contains a conspicuous statement, however expressed, to the effect that the promise or order is not negotiable or is not an instrument governed by this Article.

Thus, for a writing to be a negotiable instrument under Article 3, the following requirements must be met:

1. The promise or order to pay must be unconditional;
2. The payment must be a specific sum of money, although interest may be added to the sum;
3. The payment must be made on demand or at a definite time;
4. The instrument must not require the person promising payment to perform any act other than paying the money specified;
5. The instrument must be payable to bearer or to order.

The latter requirement is referred to as the "words of negotiability": a writing which does not contain the words "to the order of" (within the four corners of the instrument or in endorsement on the note or in allonge) or indicate that it is payable to the individual holding the contract document (analogous to the holder in due course) is not a negotiable instrument and is not governed by Article 3, even if it appears to have all of the other features of negotiability. The only exception is that if an instrument meets the definition of a cheque (a bill of exchange payable on demand and drawn on a bank) and is not payable to order (i.e. if it just reads "pay John Doe") then it is treated as a negotiable instrument.

UCC Article 3 does not apply to money, to payment orders governed by Article 4A, or to securities governed by Article 8.

=== Negotiation and endorsement ===
Persons other than the original obligor and obligee can become parties to a negotiable instrument. The most common manner in which this is done is by "endorsing" (from Latin dorsum, the back + in), that is placing one's signature on the back of the instrument—if the person who signs does so with the intention of obtaining payment of the instrument or acquiring or transferring rights to the instrument, the signature is called an endorsement. There are five types of endorsements contemplated by the Code, covered in UCC Article 3, Sections 204–206:

- An endorsement which purports to transfer the instrument to a specified person is a special endorsement – for example, "Pay to the order of Amy";
- An endorsement by the payee or holder which does not contain any additional notation (thus purporting to make the instrument payable to bearer) is an endorsement in blank or blank endorsement;
- An endorsement which purports to require that the funds be applied in a certain manner (e.g. "for deposit only", "for collection") is a restrictive endorsement; and,
- An endorsement purporting to disclaim retroactive liability is called a qualified endorsement (through the inscription of the words "without recourse" as part of the endorsement on the instrument or in allonge to the instrument).
- An endorsement purporting to add terms and conditions is called a conditional endorsement – for example, "Pay to the order of Amy, if she rakes my lawn next Thursday November 15th, 2007". The UCC states that these conditions may be disregarded.

If a note or draft is negotiated to a person who acquires the instrument

1. in good faith;
2. for value;
3. without notice of any defenses to payment,

the transferee is a holder in due course and can enforce the instrument without being subject to defenses which the maker of the instrument would be able to assert against the original payee, except for certain real defenses. These real defenses include (1) forgery of the instrument; (2) fraud as to the nature of the instrument being signed; (3) alteration of the instrument; (4) incapacity of the signer to contract; (5) infancy of the signer; (6) duress; (7) discharge in bankruptcy; and, (8) the running of a statute of limitations as to the validity of the instrument. The holder-in-due-course rule is a rebuttable presumption that makes the free transfer of negotiable instruments feasible in the modern economy. A person or entity purchasing an instrument in the ordinary course of business can reasonably expect that it will be paid when presented to, and not subject to dishonor by, the maker, without involving itself in a dispute between the maker and the person to whom the instrument was first issued (this can be contrasted to the lesser rights and obligations accruing to mere holders). Article 3 of the Uniform Commercial Code as enacted in a particular State's law contemplate real defenses available to purported holders in due course. The foregoing is the theory and application presuming compliance with the relevant law. Practically, the obligor-payor on an instrument who feels he has been defrauded or otherwise unfairly dealt with by the payee may nonetheless refuse to pay even a holder in due course, requiring the latter to resort to litigation to recover on the instrument.

=== Usage ===
While bearer instruments are rarely created as such, a holder of commercial paper with the holder designated as payee can change the instrument to a bearer instrument by an endorsement. The proper holder simply signs the back of the instrument and the instrument becomes bearer paper, although in recent years, third party checks are not being honored by most banks unless the original payee has signed a notarized document stating such.

Alternatively, an individual or company may write a check payable to "cash" or "bearer" and create a bearer instrument. Great care should be taken with the security of the instrument, as it is legally almost as good as cash.

=== Exceptions ===
Under the Code, the following are not negotiable instruments, although the law governing obligations with respect to such items may be similar to or derived from the law applicable to negotiable instruments:

- Bills of lading and other documents of title, which are governed by Article 7 of the Code. However, under admiralty law, a bill of lading may either be a negotiable or 'order' bill of lading, or a non-negotiable or 'straight' bill of lading.
- Deeds and other documents conveying interests in real estate, although a mortgage may secure a promissory note which is governed by Article 3
- IOUs
- Letters of credit, which are governed by Article 5 of the Code

== Modern relevance ==
Although often considered foundational in business law, the modern relevance of negotiability has been questioned. Negotiability can be traced back to the 1700s and Lord Mansfield, when money and liquidity was relatively scarce. The holder in due course rule has been limited by various statutes. Concerns have also been raised that the holder in due course rule does not align the incentives of the mortgage originators and the assignees efficiently.

== See also ==
- Bearer instrument
- Hundi
- Negotiable cow
