= Crossing of cheques =

Method of restricting redemption of cheques

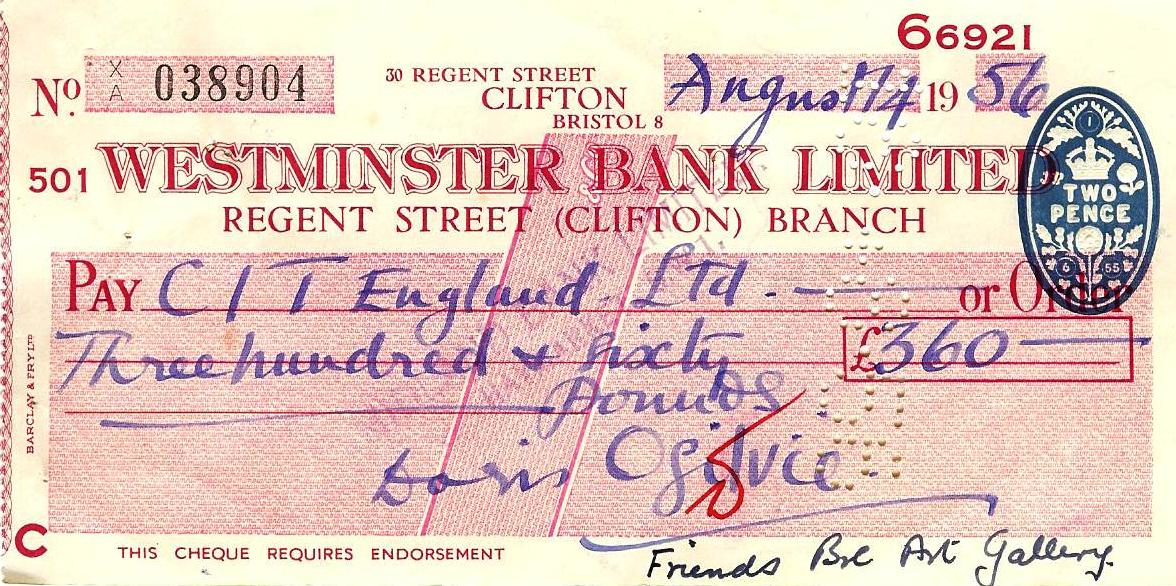
A crossed cheque – the oblique or vertical lines in the centre form the crossing. Like most modern cheques in the UK, the cheque is pre-crossed as printed by the Bank.

A crossed cheque is a cheque that has been marked specifying an instruction on the way it is to be redeemed. A common instruction is for the cheque to be deposited directly to an account with a bank and not to be immediately cashed by the holder over the bank counter. The format and wording varies between countries, but generally, two parallel lines may be placed either vertically across the cheque or on the top left hand corner of the cheque. By using crossed cheques, cheque writers can effectively protect the instrument from being stolen or cashed by unauthorized persons.

Cheques can be open (uncrossed) or crossed.

== Types of crossing ==
=== General crossing ===
A crossed cheque generally is a cheque that only bears two parallel transverse lines, optionally with the words 'and company' or '& Co.' (or any abbreviation of them) on the face of the cheque, between the lines, usually at the top left corner or at any place in the approximate half (in width) of the cheque. In the UK, the crossing is across the cheque by the person who originally wrote the cheque (the drawer), or it can legitimately be added by the person the cheque is payable to (the payee), or even by the bank that the cheque is being paid into.

Generally-crossed cheques can only be paid into a bank account, so that the beneficiary can be traced.

Crossing alone does not affect the negotiability of the instrument.

==== Account payee ====
Adding a crossing to a cheque increases its security in that it cannot be cashed at a bank counter but must be paid into an account in exactly the same name as the payee or endorsee indicated on the check.

==== Not negotiable ====
The words 'not negotiable' can be added to a crossing. The effect of such a crossing is that it removes the most important characteristic of a negotiable instrument (according to section 123).

=== Restrictive or account payee crossings ===
Where some customary instruction is written between the two parallel transverse lines (constituting crossing of cheque) that may result in imposing certain restrictions on the collecting or paying banker, it is called restrictive crossing. A crossing may have the name of a specific banker added between the lines. A cheque with such a crossing can only be paid into an account at that bank. The beneficiary bank can add an additional crossing to allow another bank, who are acting as their agent in collecting payment on cheques, to be paid the cheque on their behalf. The example is "State Bank of India". In these cases, the respective restrictions mandate to pay the cheque through State Bank of India (acting as collecting banker) only.

== Consequence of a bank not complying with the crossing ==
A bank's failure to comply with the crossings amounts to a breach of contract with its customer. The bank may not be able to debit the drawer's account and may be liable to the true owner for his loss.
