= Unfair Contract Terms Act 1977 =

Act of the Parliament of the United Kingdom

Unfair Contract Terms Act 1977 (Note: Section 31(1).)
- Act of Parliament
- Parliament of the United Kingdom
- Long title: An Act to impose further limits on the extent to which under the law of England and Wales and Northern Ireland civil liability for breach of contract, or for negligence or other breach of duty, can be avoided by means of contract terms and otherwise, and under the law of Scotland civil liability can be avoided by means of contract terms.
- Citation: 1977 c. 50
- Territorial extent: England and Wales; Scotland; Northern Ireland; (Note: Section 31(2)–(4).)

Dates
- Royal assent: 26 October 1977
- Commencement: 1 February 1978 (Note: Section 31(1).)

Other legislation
- Amends: Consumer Protection Act 1961; Consumer Protection Act (Northern Ireland) 1965; Misrepresentation Act 1967; Supply of Goods (Implied Terms) Act 1973
- Amended by: Consumer Safety Act 1978; Sale of Goods Act 1979; Statute Law (Repeals) Act 1981; Supply of Goods and Services Act 1982; Occupiers' Liability Act 1984; Telecommunications Act 1984; Occupiers' Liability (Northern Ireland) Order 1987; Copyright, Designs and Patents Act 1988; Contracts (Applicable Law) Act 1990; Law Reform (Miscellaneous Provisions) (Scotland) Act 1990; Regulatory Reform (Trading Stamps) Order 2005; Law Reform (Miscellaneous Provisions) (Northern Ireland) Order 2005; Rights of Passengers in Bus and Coach Transport (Exemptions and Enforcement) Regulations 2013; Consumer Rights Act 2015

Status: Amended

Text of statute as originally enacted

Revised text of statute as amended

Text of the Unfair Contract Terms Act 1977 as in force today (including any amendments) within the United Kingdom, from legislation.gov.uk.

The Unfair Contract Terms Act 1977 (c. 50) is an act of the Parliament of the United Kingdom which regulates contracts by restricting the operation and legality of some contract terms. It extends to nearly all forms of contract and one of its most important functions is limiting the applicability of disclaimers of liability. The terms extend to both actual contract terms and notices that are seen to constitute a contractual obligation.

The act renders terms excluding or limiting liability ineffective or subject to reasonableness, depending on the nature of the obligation purported to be excluded and whether the party is purporting to exclude or limit business liability, acting against a consumer.

It is normally used in conjunction with the Unfair Terms in Consumer Contracts Regulations 1999 (SI 1999/2083), (Note: As amended by the Unfair Terms in Consumer Contracts (Amendment) Regulations 2001 (SI 2001/1186) which merely further defined a 'Financial Service Authority'.) as well as the Sale of Goods Act 1979 and the Supply of Goods and Services Act 1982.

The Law Commission and the Scottish Law Commission have recommended that the Unfair Terms in Consumer Contracts Regulations 1999 and the Unfair Contract Terms Act 1977 should be replaced by a more unified and coherent regime. As of 2015, the Law Commission's recommendations were implemented in part by Part 2 of the Consumer Rights Act 2015.

== Terms rendered ineffective ==
Negligence. s2(1), liability for negligence occasioning death or personal injury cannot be excluded.

Manufacturers' guarantee. s5(1), loss arising from (a) defective goods or (b) negligence of distributor cannot be excluded where goods are "of a type ordinarily supplied for private use or consumption".

Sale of goods

- s6(1), implied terms as to title (Sale of Goods Act 1979 s12) cannot be excluded.
- s6(2), implied terms as to description, quality or sample (Sale of Goods Act 1979 ss13-15) cannot be excluded against a consumer.

Terms governed by the Consumer Protection Act 1987.

They are also governed (since 2007) by the Occupiers Liability Act 1984.

== Terms subject to reasonableness ==
Negligence. s2(2), exclusion of liability for all types of negligence (other than for death or personal injury which is banned) must satisfy the requirement of reasonableness.

Contractual liability. s3, This applies against a party that deals on standard written terms or where the other party deals as a consumer. Any exclusion by that party for liability arising from a breach committed by that party under the same contract (s3(2)(a)) or performance under a contract which is substantially or totally different of that which is reasonably expected of him (s(3)(b)) shall be void except insofar as it satisfies the requirement of reasonableness.

Indemnity clauses. s4, A party dealing as a consumer cannot contract to indemnify a third party on behalf of the other party, except insofar as it satisfies the requirement of reasonableness.

Sale of goods. s6(3), Implied terms as to description, quality and sample (Sale of Goods Act 1979 ss 13–15) may only be reasonably excluded where neither party is dealing as a consumer.

Misrepresentation. s8, substitutes the Misrepresentation Act 1967 s3. Under that post-1979 section, an exclusion of liability for misrepresentation must satisfy the requirement of reasonableness.

== Definition of consumer and business ==
Business. s 1(3), The act only applies to "liability for breach of obligations or duties arising (a) from things done or to be done by a person in the course of a business (whether his own business or another's); or (b) from the occupation of premises used for business purposes of the occupier". s14, Includes any government department.

Consumer. s 12, A party deals as a consumer if

- s12(1)(a), He is not in the course of a business and does not hold himself to do so.
- s12(1)(b), the other party is in the course of a business.
- s12(1)(c), In a contract for sale of goods, the goods are of a type "ordinarily supplied for private use or consumption" (s12(1A), this subsection does not apply to individuals)
- s12(2), A party is not a consumer if dealing at an auction where he has the opportunity to attend in person or is not a natural person buying auction.
- s12(3), Burden is upon the party purported to be acting in the course of a business to show that either he is not in the course of a business or that the other party is otherwise not a consumer.

== Definition of reasonableness ==
Section 11 provides some guidance but most development has been in common law.

Schedule 2 gives guidelines specifically to ss 6(3), 7(3), 7(4).

Case law

- Stewart Gill Ltd v Horatio Myer & Co Ltd. provides that reasonableness is assessed at the time of contract; and that the burden of proof is upon the party purporting to have excluded liability.
- Levison v Patent Steam Carpet Cleaning Co Ltd. provides that clarity and preciseness will raise the reasonableness of a term; and vice versa. See also Stag Line Ltd v Tyne Ship Repair Group Ltd. as to small print (literally – relating to the size of the lettering).
- Smith v Eric S Bush. Lord Griffith provides four points that may be considered (see application in St Albans City and District Council v International Computers Ltd):
  - Equality of bargaining powers.
  - How practical was it to obtain independent legal advice regarding the term?
  - How difficult is the task being undertaken for which liability is being excluded?
  - What are the practical consequences of ruling that a term is unreasonable?
- Pegler v Wang (2000) is an exclusion of liability case noted within a family of legal cases relating to "system supply contracts", relating to the purchase of an IT system which, the customer argued, did not do what was wanted. The purchasers (Pegler) had made it clear that they preferred a system installation whose performance could be "certainly guaranteed" rather than a better-functioning system whose operation might not be satisfactory. The exemption clause in this particular case was held to be unreasonable, and the judge made an order for rectification of the contract to include certain correspondence relied on by Pegler. A further hearing arose as to costs.
- Other relevant cases include Watford Electronics v Sanderson (2001), South West Water v ICL [1999] BLR 420 and Horace Holman Group Ltd v Sherwood International Group Ltd. (2000) (Unrep, 12 April 2000).

== See also ==
- Standard form contract
- Consumer Rights Act 2015
- Unfair Terms in Consumer Contracts Regulations 1999
- Electronic Commerce Regulations 2002
- Office of Fair Trading v Abbey National and Others (2008) - Bank charges test case
- Britvic Soft Drinks Ltd v Messer UK Ltd [2002] EWCA Civ 548
- Commerzbank AG v Keen [2007] IRLR 132
- Baltic Shipping Company v Dillon (1993) 176 CLR 344

== Bibliography ==
- Atiyah, Patrick (2000). An Introduction to the Law of Contract. Oxford: Clarendon.
- Collins, Hugh (2004). Contract Law in Context. Cambridge: Cambridge University Press.
- McKendrick, E. (2009). Contract Law (8th ed.). Palgrave.
- Hilliard, J.; O'Sullivan, J. (2006). The Law of Contract (2nd ed.). Oxford: Oxford University Press.
- Burrows, A. (2009). A Casebook on Contract (2nd ed.). Oxford: Hart.
- Poole, Jill (2006). Casebook on Contract Law (8th ed.). Oxford: Oxford University Press.
- McKendrick, Ewan (2005). Contract Law – Text, Cases and Materials. Oxford: Oxford University Press. ISBN 0-19-927480-0.
