= Fraudulent trading =

Doing business with intent to defraud creditors

In company law, fraudulent trading is doing business with intent to defraud creditors.

== Law ==
Where during the course of a winding-up, it appears to the liquidator that fraudulent trading has occurred, the liquidator may apply to the court for an order any persons who were knowingly parties to the carrying on of such business are to be made liable to make such contributions (if any) to the company's assets as the court thinks proper.

Conceptually, fraudulent trading is similar to a fraudulent conveyance, but the key distinction is that an application to have a transaction set aside as a fraudulent conveyance usually requires to the third party beneficiary to disgorge the benefit of the conveyance to undo the loss to the company's assets, whereas a court order in relation to fraudulent trading it is the responsible parties (usually the directors) who must make up the loss and the third party beneficiaries will usually retain the benefit. However, it is legally possible for a single transaction to be simultaneously fraudulent trading and a fraudulent conveyance, and to be the subject on concurrent applications. Some legal systems permit a director who makes a contribution to the company's assets pursuant to an order for fraudulent trading to subrogated to any claim that the company might have with respect to a fraudulent conveyance.

In practice, applications for orders in respect of fraudulent trading are rare because of the high burden of proof associated with fraud. Usually, even where fraudulent trading is suspected, an application is made with respect to an allegation of "wrongful trading" (or "insolvent trading") where the burden of proof is lower. Where applications are brought for fraudulent trading, it is usually because when the trading occurred, the company was not insolvent at that time (insolvency at the time of the trading is normally a requirement to establish wrongful trading, but not fraudulent trading).

The effect of a successful application for fraudulent trading varies between different legal systems. In some countries, the assets contributed by the directors are treated as general assets which may be taken by any secured creditors who may have a security interest which attaches to all the company's assets (characteristically, a floating charge). However, some countries have "ring-fenced" payments made for fraudulent trading so that they are made available to the pool of assets for unsecured creditors.

Fraudulent trading is entirely separate and distinct from "insider trading", which focuses purely upon the abuse of inside information in relation to financial markets for personal financial gain, and is wholly unrelated to creditor's rights or insolvency law.

== Cases ==
- R v Grantham [1984] QB 675
- Re Augustus Barnett & Son Ltd [1986] BCLC 170
- Re Sarflax Ltd [1979] Ch 592

== See also ==
- UK company law
