= Jeremy Stuart-Smith =

English judge (born 1955)

The Right Honourable Lord Justice Stuart-Smith
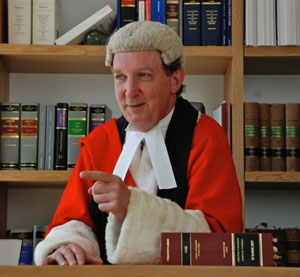

Lord Justice of Appeal
- Incumbent
- Assumed office 1 October 2020
- Monarchs: Elizabeth II; Charles III

High Court Judge Queen's Bench Division
- In office 2 October 2012 – 30 September 2020

Personal details
- Born: Jeremy Hugh Stuart-Smith; 18 January 1955 (age 71)
- Spouse: Hon. Arabella Montgomery
- Children: 5
- Parent: Sir Murray Stuart-Smith (father)
- Education: Radley College
- Alma mater: Corpus Christi College, Cambridge
- Occupation: Judge

Sir Jeremy Hugh Stuart-Smith (born 18 January 1955), styled the Rt Hon Lord Justice Stuart-Smith, is an English judge who has been a Lord Justice of Appeal since 2020.

== Origins and education ==
He is the son of Sir Murray Stuart-Smith (a former Lord Justice of Appeal) and Joan, the daughter of Major Thomas Motion. He was educated at Radley College and at Corpus Christi College, Cambridge.

== Legal career ==
Stuart-Smith was called to the Bar in 1978 and was appointed Queen's Counsel in 1997. He was appointed a High Court judge with effect from 2 October 2012, being assigned by the Lord Chief Justice to the Queen’s Bench Division. He was consequentially knighted in the 2013 Special Honours. He was promoted to the Court of Appeal on 1 October 2020.

He is the co-author, with Professor Robert Merkin, of a textbook on the law of motor insurance.

== Personal life ==
Stuart-Smith married on 25 September 1982 Hon. Arabella Montgomery, the daughter of David Montgomery, 2nd Viscount Montgomery of Alamein. They had five children:

- Emma Stuart-Smith (born 6 October 1984)
- Laura Stuart-Smith (1986–1987)
- Edward Murray Stuart-Smith (born 6 May 1988)
- Samuel Nicholas Stuart-Smith (born 6 December 1990)
- Luke David Stuart-Smith (born 19 January 1993)

He is a keen player of the French horn.
