= Malcolm Pill =

British judge (born 1938)

The Right Honourable Sir Malcolm Pill

Lord Justice of Appeal
- In office 1995–2013

Justice of the High Court
- In office 1988–1995

Sir Malcolm Thomas Pill (born 11 March 1938) is a former Lord Justice of Appeal, who was the longest-serving member of the Court of Appeal of England and Wales upon reaching mandatory retirement at age 75.

Pill was born on 11 March 1938 into a Cardiff family, the son of a barristers' clerk. He was educated at Whitchurch Grammar School, Cardiff and Trinity College, Cambridge. He was called to the bar (Gray's Inn) in 1962.

From 1963 to 1964, he was Third Secretary at the Foreign and Commonwealth Office and spent a period in Geneva at the United Nations Commission on Human Rights. For nine years he was chairman of the United Kingdom Committee of the Freedom from Hunger Campaign.

He was a Recorder from 1976 to 1987. He became a Queen's Counsel in 1978, and was appointed a High Court judge on 15 January 1988, receiving the customary knighthood, and assigned to the Queen's Bench Division. From 1989 to 1993, he was Presiding Judge for the Wales and Chester Circuit.

He was appointed a Lord Justice of Appeal on 1 February 1995, and was given the customary Privy Council appointment. Among his most notable judgments is the second appeal in the Stephen Downing case.

He retired from the Court of Appeal on 11 March 2013.

== Judgments ==
Important decisions of Lord Justice Pill include:

- Smith v Lloyds TSB Group plc [2001] QB 541
- Irving v Penguin Books Ltd
- HJ (Iran) and HT (Cameroon) v Secretary of State for the Home Department [2010] UKSC 31 (at Court of Appeal)
- Delaware v City of Westminster [2001] UKHL 55 (at Court of Appeal)
- FHR European Ventures LLP v Cedar Capital Partners LLC [2014] UKSC 45 (at Court of Appeal)
- Haugesund Kommune v DEPFA ACS Bank [2010] EWCA Civ 579

== Publications ==
- Pill, Malcolm (1994). European Parliamentary Constituency Committee for Wales: Report. London: H.M.S.O. ISBN 978-0101244121.
- — (1999). A Cardiff Family in the Forties. Chesterfield: Merton Priory Press. ISBN 1-898937-31-1. (childhood memoirs)
- — (2016). Choices and Chances 1948-1969: Memories of a Cardiffian. Malcolm Pill. ISBN 978-0993500305. (memoirs)
