= Bills of Exchange Act 1882 =

Act of the Parliament of the United Kingdom

Bills of Exchange Act 1882 (Note: Section 1.)
- Act of Parliament
- Parliament of the United Kingdom
- Long title: An Act to codify the law relating to Bills of Exchange, Cheques, and Promissory Notes.
- Citation: 45 & 46 Vict. c. 61
- Introduced by: Sir John Lubbock MP (Commons)
- Territorial extent: United Kingdom

Dates
- Royal assent: 18 August 1882
- Commencement: 18 August 1882 (Note: The Acts of Parliament (Commencement) Act 1793.)
Other legislation
| Amends | See § Repealed enactments |
| Repeals/revokes | See § Repealed enactments |
| Amended by | Statute Law Revision Act 1898; Bills of Exchange (Time of Noting) Act 1917; Finance Act 1939; Cheques Act 1957; National Loans Act 1968; Decimal Currency Act 1969; Finance Act (Northern Ireland) 1970; Finance Act 1970; Banking and Financial Dealings Act 1971; Consumer Credit Act 1974; Administration of Justice Act 1977; Judicature (Northern Ireland) Act 1978; Law Reform (Miscellaneous Provisions) (Scotland) Act 1985; Cheques Act 1992; Postal Services Act 2011 |

Status: Amended

History of passage through Parliament

Text of statute as originally enacted

Revised text of statute as amended

Text of the Bills of Exchange Act 1882 as in force today (including any amendments) within the United Kingdom, from legislation.gov.uk.

The Bills of Exchange Act 1882 (45 & 46 Vict. c. 61) is an act of the Parliament of the United Kingdom that codified the law relating to bills of exchange. Bills of exchange are widely used to finance trade and, when discounted with a financial institution, to obtain credit.

The act was drafted by Sir Mackenzie Chalmers, who later drafted the Sale of Goods Act 1893 (56 & 57 Vict. c. 71) and the Marine Insurance Act 1906 (8 Edw. 7. c. 41).

== Passage ==
Leave to bring in the Bills of Exchange Bill to the House of Commons was granted to Sir John Lubbock MP, Arthur Cohen MP, Lewis Fry MP, Sir Ambrose Hardinge Giffard MP and Charles James Monk MP on 15 February 1882. The bill had its first reading in the House of Commons on 15 February 1882, presented by Sir John Lubbock MP. The bill had its second reading in the House of Commons on 21 February 1882 and was committed to a select committee, with 14 members, the power to send for "persons, paper and records" and a quorum of five.

| Name | Party | Commentary |
|---|---|---|
| Sir John Lubbock MP | Liberal | |
| James Williamson MP | Liberal | |
| Richard Martin MP | Liberal | |
| Sir Farrer Herschell MP | Liberal | |
| Robert Reid MP | Liberal | |
| Lewis Fry MP | Liberal | |
| Arthur Cohen MP | Liberal | |
| Andrew Commins MP | Irish Parliamentary Party | |
| Robert Fowler MP | Conservative | |
| Thomas Charles Baring | Conservative | |
| Sir Charles Mills | Conservative | |
| William Jackson | Conservative | |
| Edward Whitley | Conservative | |
| John Mulholland | Conservative | |
| Granville Gibson | Conservative | Added on 27 March 1882. |

The committee was given the power to extend the bill to Scotland on 23 March 1882, and reported on 21 June 1882, with amendments. The amended bill was re-committed to a committee of the whole house, which met on 27 June 1882 and 3 July 1882 and reported on 5 July 1882, with amendments. The amended bill had its third reading in the House of Commons on 6 July 1882 and passed, without amendments.

The bill had its first reading in the House of Lords on 7 July 1882. The bill had its second reading in the House of Lords on 18 July 1882 and was committed to a committee of the whole house. The committee was discharged on 25 July 1882 and the bill was committed to a select committee, which was appointed with 11 members on 28 July 1882.

| Name | Commentary |
|---|---|
| John Coleridge, 1st Baron Coleridge | |
| William Watson, Baron Watson | |
| Colin Blackburn, Baron Blackburn | |
| George Bramwell, 1st Baron Bramwell | |
| John FitzGerald, Baron FitzGerald | |
| Roundell Palmer, 1st Baron Selborne | Lord Chancellor |
| Hugh Cairns, 1st Earl Cairns | |
| Arthur James Balfour, 1st Earl of Balfour | |
| James Wilde, 1st Baron Penzance | |
| George Glyn, 1st Baron Wolverton | |
| Thomas O'Hagan, 1st Baron O'Hagan | |

The committee reported on 10 August 1882, with amendments. The amended bill was re-committed to a committee of the whole house, which met and reported on 11 August 1882, with amendments. The amended bill had its third reading in the House of Lords on 11 August 1882 and passed, without amendments.

The amended bill was considered and agreed to by the House of Commons on 14 August 1882.

The bill was granted royal assent on 18 August 1882.

== Provisions ==
Section 3 of the act provided a formal definition of a bill of exchange:

An unconditional order in writing addressed by one person to another, signed by the person giving it, requiring the person to whom it is addressed to pay on demand or at a fixed or determinable future time a sum certain in money to order or to bearer.

Expressing this in less formal language, it is a written order from one party (the drawer) to another (the drawee) to pay a specified sum on demand or on a specified date to the drawer or to a third party specified by the drawer.

Section 3 of the act also required that bills of exchange be written and signed in order to be enforceable.

=== Repealed enactments ===
Section 96 of the act repealed 17 enactments, listed in the second schedule to the act. Section 96 of the act also provided that the repeals would not affect anything done or suffered, any rights, titles or interests acquired or accrued, and any legal proceedings or remedies under the repealed acts.

| Citation | Short title | Title | Extent of repeal |
|---|---|---|---|
| 9 Will. 3. c. 17 | Bills of Exchange Act 1697 | An Act for the better payment of Inland Bills of Exchange. | The whole act. |
| 3 & 4 Anne. c. 8 | Bills of Exchange Act 1704 | An Act for giving like remedy upon Promissory Notes as is now used upon Bills of Exchange, and for the better payment of Inland Bills of Exchange. | The whole act. |
| 17 Geo. 3. c. 30 | Bills of Exchange Act 1776 | An Act for further restraining the negotiation of Promissory Notes and Inland Bills of Exchange under a limited sum within that part of Great Britain called England. | The whole act. |
| 39 & 40 Geo. 3. c. 42 | Bill of Exchange Act 1800 | An Act for the better observance of Good Friday in certain cases therein mentioned. | The whole act. |
| 48 Geo. 3. c. 88 | Bill of Exchange Act 1808 | An Act to restrain the negotiation of Promissory Notes and Inland Bills of Exchange under a limited sum in England. | The whole act. |
| 1 & 2 Geo. 4. c. 78 | Bills of Exchange Act 1821 | An Act to regulate Acceptances of Bills of Exchange. | The whole act. |
| 7 & 8 Geo. 4. c. 15 | Bills of Exchange, etc. Act 1827 | An Act for declaring the law relative to Bills of Exchange and Promissory Notes becoming payable on Good Friday or Christmas Day. | The whole act. |
| 9 Geo. 4. c. 24 | Bills of Exchange (Ireland) Act 1828 | An Act to repeal certain Acts, and to consolidate and amend the laws relating to Bills of Exchange and Promissory Notes in Ireland. | Sections two, four, seven, eight, nine, ten, eleven. |
| 2 & 3 Will. 4. c. 98 | Bills of Exchange Act 1832 | An Act for regulating the protesting for nonpayment of Bills of Exchange drawn by the banker of a place upon the place of the residence of the drawee or drawees of the same. | The whole act. |
| 6 & 7 Will. 4. c. 58 | Bills of Exchange Act 1836 | An Act to declare the law as to what day it requires to be present for payment to Acceptor, or Acceptors supra protest for honour, or to the Referee or Referees, in case of need, Bills of Exchange which have been dishonoured. | The whole act. |
| 8 & 9 Vict. c. 37 | Bankers (Ireland) Act 1845 | An Act to regulate the issue of Bank Notes in Ireland, and to regulate the repayment of certain sums advanced by the Governor and Company of the Bank of Ireland for the public service. | Sections six and seven. |
| 19 & 20 Vict. c. 97 | Mercantile Law Amendment Act 1856 | The Mercantile Law Amendment Act, 1856. | Section twenty-four. |
| 23 & 24 Vict. c. 111 | Stamp Duties Act 1860 | An Act for granting to Her Majesty certain Duties of Stamps, and to amend the laws relating to the Stamp Duties. | Section nineteen. |
| 34 & 35 Vict. c. 74 | Bills of Exchange Act 1871 | An Act to abolish days of grace in the case of Bills of Exchange and Promissory Notes payable at sight or on presentation. | The whole act. |
| 39 & 40 Vict. c. 81 | Crossed Cheques Act 1876 | The Crossed Cheques Act, 1876. | The whole act. |
| 41 & 42 Vict. c. 13 | Bills of Exchange Act 1878 | The Bills of Exchange Act, 1878. | The whole act. |
| 19 & 20 Vict. c. 60 | Mercantile Law Amendment Act (Scotland) 1856 | The Mercantile Law Amendment Act (Scotland), 1856. | Sections ten, eleven, twelve, thirteen, fourteen, fifteen and sixteen. |

== Subsequent developments ==
The act was described as a Consolidation Act.

=== Judicial consideration ===
Cases which have considered the application of the Bills of Exchange Act 1882 include:

- Smith v Lloyds TSB Group plc [2001] QB 541

== See also ==
- English contract law
