= Re Augustus Barnett & Son Ltd =

1986 High Court case on UK insolvency law

- Court: High Court
- Citations: [1986] BCLC 170; The Times, December 7, 1985

Case opinions
- Hoffmann J

Keywords
- Fraudulent trading

Re Augustus Barnett & Son Ltd [1986] BCLC 170 is a UK insolvency law case on the standard of fault required to show that directors have been guilty of fraudulent trading.

== Facts ==
Augustus Barnett & Sons Ltd (Barnett) was a subsidiary of Rumasa SA and the main retail UK retail store for wine and sherry export. Barnett had a deficiency of assets, and its auditors would not certify accounts on a going concern basis, unless Rumasa confirmed it would keep supporting the company. Rumasa did, saying with a 'letter of comfort' on June 1, 1982 that it would provide additional working capital. It had given £4m in subsidies by 1981.

Rumasa was nationalised by the Spanish government on February 23, 1983. Barnett's asset deficiency was now £4.5m. Auditors and lawyers advised that the directors of Barnett were at risk of personal liability for fraudulent trading (now s.213 Insolvency Act 1986; then s.332 Companies Act 1948) unless more money could pay off the debts. On September 2, 1983, Barnett went into voluntary liquidation. The liquidators applied for a declaration that Rumasa was a knowing party to fraudulent trading. Rumasa opposed and argued there was no reasonable cause of action, because it was never alleged that Barnett directors were dishonest or had any intention to defraud.

== Judgment ==
Hoffmann J agreed with Rumasa's strike out application. The Companies Act 1948, s.332 said that in winding up if it appeared that,

...any business of the company has been carried on with intent to defraud creditors the court may, if it thinks proper to do so, declare that any persons who were knowingly parties to the carrying on of the business in manner aforesaid shall be personally responsible, without any limitation of liability, for all or any of the debts or other liabilities of the company as the court may direct.

Hoffmann J held that because this section required a finding of someone carrying on a company "with intent to defraud", it was only when that requirement was fulfilled that knowing parties could be similarly liable. The state of mind of the outsider was irrelevant. There could be an action in the tort of deceit, but not s.332. Because there was no allegation of fraud on Barnett directors, the parent could be no accessory.

In an obiter dictum, Hoffmann J also looked at one of the liquidator's arguments. This was that the Rumasa's letter of comfort, for financial support over the years, should make the parent liable for Barnett's debts. He said the state of law was inadequate on this subject, and it was a question of considerable public importance; but these interlocutory proceedings were not a good opportunity for a wider investigation. In any case the language of s.332 was plain.

== See also ==
- R v. Grantham [1984] QB 675
