= Cavendish Square Holding BV v Talal El Makdessi =

English contract law case

Cavendish Square BV v Makdessi and ParkingEye Ltd v Beavis
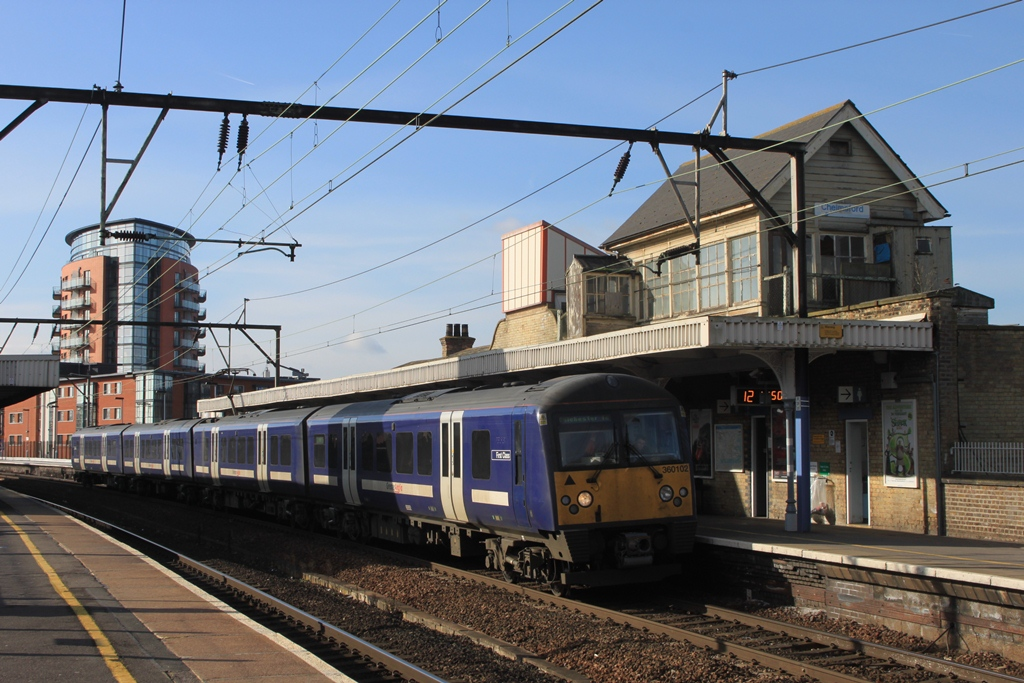
- Chelmsford railway station
- Court: Supreme Court of the United Kingdom
- Full case name: Cavendish Square Holding BV v Talal El Makdessi
- Decided: 4 November 2015
- Citation: [2015] UKSC 67

Case history
- Prior action: Cavendish Square Holdings BV v Makdessi [2013] EWCA Civ 1539

Court membership
- Judges sitting: Lord Neuberger; Lord Mance; Lord Clarke; Lord Sumption; Lord Carnwath; Lord Toulson; Lord Hodge

Keywords
- Penalty clause, Consumer, unfair terms

Cavendish Square Holding BV v Talal El Makdessi [2015] UKSC 67, together with its companion case ParkingEye Ltd v Beavis, are English contract law cases concerning the validity of penalty clauses and (in relation to ParkingEye Ltd v Beavis) the application of the Unfair Terms in Consumer Contracts Directive (as implemented in the UK by, at the time, the Unfair Terms in Consumer Contracts Regulations 1999, now superseded by the Consumer Rights Act 2015). The UK Supreme Court ruled on both cases together on 4 November 2015, updating the established legal rule on penalty clauses and replacing the test of whether or not a disputed clause is "a genuine pre-estimate of loss" with a test asking whether it imposed a proportionate detriment in relation to any "legitimate interest" of the innocent party.

Commentators on the ruling have noted that "these cases provide some welcome clarification to the law in this area".

== Facts ==
=== Cavendish Square Holding BV v Makdessi ===
In Makdessi, because the issue of penalty clauses had been taken as a preliminary issue, the appeal was heard on the basis of an agreed set of facts (the court having not yet heard evidence or made any determinations). The agreed facts were summarised in the judgment of Lord Mance:

117. The transaction was effected by a sale and purchase agreement dated 28 February 2008, whereby Mr El Makdessi and Mr Ghoussoub agreed that the 47.4% shareholding in an underlying company should be held between them in the ratio of 53.88% to 46.12% (Mr El Makdessi's share being 53.88%). The price was payable in stages: US$65.5m was payable on completion of the sale and group reorganisation. Thereafter, there were to be interim and final payments derived from a multiple of the group's audited consolidated operating profit between respectively 2007 and 2009 and 2007 and 2011. Clause 11.2 of the agreement was a clause prohibiting Mr El Makdessi from various competitive or potentially competitive activity. Clauses 5.1 and 5.6 provided that, if he breached clause 11.2, he would not be entitled to receive the interim and/or final payments due, and could be required to sell Cavendish the rest of his shares at a "Defaulting Shareholder Option Price", based on a straight asset value and so ignoring any goodwill value. Mr El Makdessi also became non-executive chair with a service agreement binding him to remain in position for at least 18 months.

It was accepted by Mr El Makdessi for the purposes of the case that he did subsequently breach clause 11.2, and was thereby also in breach of his fiduciary duties. The proceedings were initiated by both Cavendish and the main holding company. The holding company's claim (for breach of fiduciary duty) was settled in October 2012 when it accepted a Part 36 payment of US$500,000 made by Mr El Makdessi. Cavendish's claim was for declarations that Mr El Makdessi's breach of clause 11.2 means that clauses 5.1 and 5.6 now have the effect stated. Mr El Makdessi argued that they were unenforceable penalty clauses.

=== ParkingEye Limited v Beavis ===
In ParkingEye, the appellant, Mr Beavis, was the owner and driver of a vehicle which he parked in a retail shopping car park adjacent to Chelmsford railway station. The owner of the retail site and car park, British Airways Pension Fund (BAPF), had contracted ParkingEye Ltd, the respondent, to provide "a traffic space maximisation scheme". The scheme involved the erection at the entrance to and throughout the car park of prominent notices, including the statements "2 hour max stay" and "Parking limited to 2 hours", coupled with the further notice "Failure to comply ... will result in a Parking Charge of £85". Underneath, it also stated: "By parking within the car park, motorists agree to comply with the car park regulations". Mr Beavis left his car parked for 56 minutes over the permitted two-hour period. He argued that the £85 charge demanded of him by ParkingEye (reducible to £50 if he had paid within 14 days) was an unenforceable penalty. Further or alternatively, he maintained that it was unfair and invalid within the meaning of the Unfair Terms in Consumer Contracts Regulations 1999.

== Judgment ==
The Supreme Court held by a majority (Lord Toulson dissenting in the ParkingEye case) that the provisions in the Cavendish case were not penalties, and in ParkingEye that the charge was not an unlawful penalty or contrary to the 1999 Regulations or the Unfair Terms in Consumer Contracts Directive.

Lord Sumption and Lord Neuberger gave the first opinion jointly.

32. The true test is whether the impugned provision is a secondary obligation which imposes a detriment on the contract-breaker out of all proportion to any legitimate interest of the innocent party in the enforcement of the primary obligation. The innocent party can have no proper interest in simply punishing the defaulter. His interest is in performance or in some appropriate alternative to performance. In the case of a straightforward damages clause, that interest will rarely extend beyond compensation for the breach, and we therefore expect that Lord Dunedin's four tests would usually be perfectly adequate to determine its validity. But compensation is not necessarily the only legitimate interest that the innocent party may have in the performance of the defaulter's primary obligations. This was recognised in the early days of the penalty rule, when it was still the creature of equity, and is reflected in Lord Macclesfield's observation in Peachy (quoted in para 5 above) about the application of the penalty rule to provisions which were "never intended by way of compensation", for which equity would not relieve. It was reflected in the result in Dunlop. And it is recognised in the more recent decisions about commercial justification. And, as Lord Hodge shows, it is the principle underlying the Scottish authorities.

33. The penalty rule is an interference with freedom of contract. It undermines the certainty which parties are entitled to expect of the law. Diplock LJ was neither the first nor the last to observe that "The court should not be astute to descry a 'penalty clause'": Robophone at p. 1447. As Lord Woolf said, speaking for the Privy Council in Philips Hong Kong Ltd v Attorney General of Hong Kong (1993) 61 BLR 41, 59, "the court has to be careful not to set too stringent a standard and bear in mind that what the parties have agreed should normally be upheld", not least because "[a]ny other approach will lead to undesirable uncertainty especially in commercial contracts".

...

35. ... the circumstances in which the contract was made are not entirely irrelevant. In a negotiated contract between properly advised parties of comparable bargaining power, the strong initial presumption must be that the parties themselves are the best judges of what is legitimate in a provision dealing with the consequences of breach. In that connection, it is worth noting that in Philips Hong Kong at pp. 57–59, Lord Woolf specifically referred to the possibility of taking into account the fact that "one of the parties to the contract is able to dominate the other as to the choice of the terms of a contract" when deciding whether a damages clause was a penalty. In doing so, he reflected the view expressed by Mason and Wilson JJ in AMEV-UDC at p. 194 that the courts were thereby able to "strike a balance between the competing interests of freedom of contract and protection of weak contracting parties" (citing Atiyah, The Rise and Fall of Freedom of Contract (1979), Chapter 22). However, Lord Woolf was rightly at pains to point out that this did not mean that the courts could thereby adopt "some broader discretionary approach". The notion that the bargaining position of the parties may be relevant is also supported by Lord Browne-Wilkinson giving the judgment of the Privy Council in Workers Bank. At p. 580, he rejected the notion that "the test of reasonableness [could] depend upon the practice of one class of vendor, which exercises considerable financial muscle" as it would allow such people "to evade the law against penalties by adopting practices of their own". In his judgment, he decided that, in contracts for sale of land, a clause providing for a forfeitable deposit of 10% of the purchase price was valid, although it was an anomalous exception to the penalty rule. However, he held that the clause providing for a forfeitable 25% deposit in that case was invalid because "in Jamaica, the customary deposit has been 10%" and "[a] vendor who seeks to obtain a larger amount by way of forfeitable deposit must show special circumstances which justify such a deposit", which the appellant vendor in that case failed to do.

...

104. In our opinion, the same considerations which show that the £85 charge is not a penalty, demonstrate that it is not unfair for the purpose of the Regulations.

105. The reason is that although it arguably falls within the illustrative description of potentially unfair terms at paragraph 1(e) of Schedule 2 to the Regulations, it is not within the basic test for unfairness in regulations 5(1) and 6(1). The Regulations give effect to Council Directive 93/13/EEC on unfair terms in consumer contracts, and these rather opaque provisions are lifted word for word from articles 3 and 4 of the Directive. The effect of the Regulations was considered by the House of Lords in Director General of Fair Trading v First National Bank plc [2002] 1 AC 481. But it is sufficient now to refer to Aziz v Caixa d'Estalvis de Catalunya, Tarragona i Manresa (Case C-415/11) [2013] 3 CMLR 89, which is the leading case on the topic in the Court of Justice of the European Union. Aziz was a reference from a Spanish court seeking guidance on the criteria for determining the fairness of three provisions in a loan agreement. They provided for (i) the acceleration of the repayment schedule in the event of the borrower's default, (ii) the charging of default interest, and (iii) the unilateral certification by the lender of the amount due for the purpose of legal proceedings. The judgment of the Court of Justice is authority for the following propositions:

1. The test of "significant imbalance" and "good faith" in article 3 of the Directive (regulation 5(1) of the 1999 Regulations) "merely defines in a general way the factors that render unfair a contractual term that has not been individually negotiated" (para 67). A significant element of judgment is left to the national court, to exercise in the light of the circumstances of each case.
2. The question whether there is a "significant imbalance in the parties' rights" depends mainly on whether the consumer is being deprived of an advantage which he would enjoy under national law in the absence of the contractual provision (paras 68, 75). In other words, this element of the test is concerned with provisions derogating from the legal position of the consumer under national law.
3. However, a provision derogating from the legal position of the consumer under national law will not necessarily be treated as unfair. The imbalance must arise "contrary to the requirements of good faith". That will depend on "whether the seller or supplier, dealing fairly and equitably with the consumer, could reasonably assume that the consumer would have agreed to such a term in individual contract negotiations" (para 69).
4. The national court is required by article 4 of the Directive (regulation 6(1) of the 1999 Regulations) to take account of, among other things, the nature of the goods or services supplied under the contract. This includes the significance, purpose and practical effect of the term in question, and whether it is "appropriate for securing the attainment of the objectives pursued by it in the member state concerned and does not go beyond what is necessary to achieve them" (paras 71–74). In the case of a provision whose operation is conditional upon the consumer's breach of another term of the contract, it is necessary to assess the importance of the latter term in the contractual relationship.

106. In its judgment, the Court of Justice drew heavily on the opinion of Advocate General Kokott, specifically endorsing her analysis at a number of points. That analysis, which is in the nature of things more expansive than the court's, repays careful study. In the Advocate General's view, the requirement that the "significant imbalance" should be contrary to good faith was included in order to limit the Directive's inroads into the principle of freedom of contract. "[I]t is recognised", she said, "that in many cases parties have a legitimate interest in organising their contractual relations in a manner which derogates from the [rules of national law]" (para AG73). In determining whether the seller could reasonably assume that the consumer would have agreed to the relevant term in a negotiation, it is important to consider a number of matters. These include

"whether such contractual terms are common, that is to say they are used regularly in legal relations in similar contracts, or are surprising, whether there is an objective reason for the term and whether, despite the shift in the contractual balance in favour of the user of the term in relation to the substance of the term in question, the consumer is not left without protection" (para AG75).

Advocate General Kokott returned to the question of legitimate interest when addressing default interest. She observed that a provision requiring the payment upon default of a sum exceeding the damage caused may be justified if it serves to encourage compliance with the borrower's obligations:

"If default interest is intended merely as flat-rate compensation for damage caused by default, a default interest rate will be substantially excessive if it is much higher than the accepted actual damage caused by default. It is clear, however, that a high default interest rate motivates the debtor not to default on his contractual obligations and to rectify quickly any default which has already occurred. If default interest under national law is intended to encourage observance of the agreement and thus the maintenance of payment behaviour, it should be regarded as unfair only if it is much higher than is necessary to achieve that aim" (para AG87).

Finally, the Advocate General observes that the impact of a term alleged to be unfair must be examined broadly and from both sides. Provisions favouring the lender may indirectly serve the interest of the borrower also, for example by making loans more readily available (para AG94).

107. In our opinion the term imposing the £85 charge was not unfair. The term does not exclude any right which the consumer may be said to enjoy under the general law or by statute. But it may fairly be said that in the absence of agreement on the charge, Mr Beavis would not have been liable to ParkingEye. He would have been liable to the landowner in tort for trespass, but that liability would have been limited to the occupation value of the parking space. To that extent there was an imbalance in the parties' rights. But it did not arise "contrary to the requirement of good faith", because ParkingEye and the landlord to whom ParkingEye was providing the service had a legitimate interest in imposing a liability on Mr Beavis in excess of the damages that would have been recoverable at common law. ParkingEye had an interest in inducing him to observe the two-hour limit in order to enable customers of the retail outlets and other members of the public to use the available parking space. To echo the observations of the Advocate General at para AG94 of her opinion, charging overstayers £85 underpinned a business model which enabled members of the public to park free of charge for two hours. This was fundamental to the contractual relationship created by Mr Beavis's acceptance of the terms of the notice, whose whole object was the efficient management of the car park. It was an interest of exactly the kind envisaged by the Advocate General at para AG87 of her opinion and by the Court of Justice at para 74 of the judgment. There is no reason to regard the amount of the charge as any higher than was necessary to achieve that objective.

108. Could ParkingEye, "dealing fairly and equitably with the consumer, ... reasonably assume that the consumer would have agreed to such a term in individual contract negotiations"? The concept of a negotiated agreement to enter a car park is somewhat artificial, but it is perfectly workable provided that one bears in mind that the test, as Advocate General Kokott pointed out in Aziz at para AG75, is objective. The question is not whether Mr Beavis himself would in fact have agreed to the term imposing the £85 charge in a negotiation, but whether a reasonable motorist in his position would have done so. In our view a reasonable motorist would have agreed. In the first place, motorists generally and Mr Beavis in particular did accept it. In the case of non-negotiated standard terms that would not ordinarily be entitled to much weight. But although the terms, like all standard contracts, were presented to motorists on a take it or leave it basis, they could not have been briefer, simpler or more prominently proclaimed. If you park here and stay more than two hours, you will pay £85. Motorists could hardly avoid reading the notice and were under no pressure to accept its terms.

109. Objectively, they had every reason to do so. They were being allowed two hours of free parking. In return they had to accept the risk of being charged £85 if they overstayed. Overstaying penalties are, as we have mentioned, both a normal feature of parking contracts on public and on private land, and important for the efficient management of the space in the interests of the general body of users and the neighbouring outlets which they may frequent. They are beneficial not just to ParkingEye, the landowner and the retail outlets, but to the motorists themselves, because they make parking space available to them which might otherwise be clogged up with commuters and other long-stay users. The amount of the charge was not exorbitant in comparison to the general level of penalties imposed for parking infractions. Nor is there any reason to think that it was higher than necessary to ensure considerate use by motorists of the available space. And, while we accept Mr Butcher's submission that the fact that the £85 charge is broadly comparable to charges levied by local authorities for parking in public car parks is not enough to show that it was levied in good faith, it is nonetheless a factor which assists ParkingEye in that connection. The risk of having to pay it was wholly under the motorist's own control. All that he needed was a watch. In our opinion, a hypothetical reasonable motorist would have agreed to objectively reasonable terms, and these terms are objectively reasonable.

Lord Mance gave a concurring opinion.

Lord Hodge gave a concurring opinion, noting that he was "initially in some doubt" about the ParkingEye case.

Lord Clarke concurred with Lord Sumption, Lord Neuberger, Lord Mance and Lord Hodge.

Lord Toulson dissented, and would have held that the £85 charge was unlawful.

307. In agreement with the opinion of Advocate General Kokott, the court held that the reference in article 3(1) to a "significant imbalance" in the parties' rights and obligations under the contract must be interpreted as requiring the court to evaluate to what extent the term places the consumer in a worse position than would have been the situation under the relevant national law in the absence of that term. Applying that test, it follows that the £85 penalty clause created a significant imbalance within the meaning of the regulation, because it far exceeded any amount which was otherwise likely to be recoverable as damages for breach of contract or trespass.

308. As to whether the imbalance was contrary to the requirement of good faith, the court, at para 76 in agreement with the Advocate General held that

"in order to assess whether the imbalance arises contrary to the requirement of good faith', it must be determined whether the seller or supplier, dealing fairly and equitably with the consumer, could reasonably assume that the consumer would have agreed to the term concerned in individual contract negotiations."

309. That test is significantly more favourable to the consumer than would be applied by a court in this country under the penalty doctrine. Whereas the starting point at common law is that parties should be kept to their bargains, and it is for those objecting that a clause is penal to establish its exorbitant nature, the starting point of the Directive is that the consumer needs special protection, and it is for the supplier to show that a non-core term which is significantly disadvantageous to the consumer, as compared with the ordinary operation of the law without that term, is one which the supplier can fairly assume that the consumer would have agreed in individual negotiations on level terms. The burden is on the supplier to adduce the evidence necessary to justify that conclusion.

310. I do not consider that such an assumption could fairly be made in the present case. The Consumers' Association through Mr Butcher advanced a number of telling points. By most people's standards £85 is a substantial sum of money. Mr Butcher reminded the court by way of comparison that the basic state pension is £115 per week. There may be many reasons why the user of a car park in a retail park may unintentionally overstay by a short period. There may be congestion in the shops or the user may be held up for any number of reasons. There may be congestion trying to get out of the car park. In short there may be numerous unforeseen circumstances. No allowance is made for disabilities (other than the provision of bays for blue badge holders). Similarly there may be good reasons for a person to return to the car park within two hours, for example because the shopper has left something behind (and the car park may incidentally be half empty). There may be reasons why a user parks with his wheels outside the marked bay (for example because of the way the adjacent vehicle is parked or because he is a wheelchair user and none of the blue bays are available). Examples could be multiplied. The point is that the penalty clause makes no allowance for circumstances, allows no period of grace and provides no room for adjustment.

311. The court was referred to a code of practice published by the British Parking Association which addresses some of these matters, but the significant fact is that it is not a contractual document. A competent lawyer representing a user in individual negotiation might be expected, among other things, to argue that the supplier should at least commit to following the code of practice.

312. More broadly the penalty clause places the whole cost of running the car park on the shoulders of those who overstay by possibly a very short time, although their contribution to the cost will have been very small. The trial judge and the Court of Appeal were impressed by a comparison with the charges at local authority car parks. The comparison is seductive but superficial. Apart from the fact that local authorities operate under a different statutory scheme, a large amount of the cost is raised from all users by hourly charges, as distinct from placing the entire burden on the minority of overstayers; and there is not the same feature in the case of a municipal car park as there is in a supermarket car park, where the car park is ancillary to the use of the retail units some of whose customers are then required to underwrite the entire cost as a result of overstaying.

313. There is of course an artificiality in postulating a hypothetical negotiation between the supplier and an individual customer with the same access to legal advice, but because it is a consumer contract, and because the supplier is inserting a term which alters the legal effect under the core terms in the supplier's favour, the supplier requires as it were to put itself in the customer's shoes and consider whether it "can reasonably assume that the customer would have agreed" to it.

314. I am not persuaded that it would be reasonable to make that assumption in this case and I would therefore have allowed the appeal. It has been suggested that managing the effective use of parking space in the interests of the retailer and the users of those outlets who wished to find spaces to park could only work by deterring people from occupying space for a long time. But that is a guess. It may be so; it may not. ParkingEye called no evidence on the point. But it is common knowledge that many supermarket car parks make no such charge. I return to the point that it was for ParkingEye to show the factual grounds on which it could reasonably assume that a customer using that car park would have agreed, in individual negotiations, to pay £85 if he overstayed for a minute, or parked with his wheels not entirely within a marked bay, or for whatever reason returned to the car park in less than one hour (perhaps because he had left something behind). On the bare information which was placed before the court, I am not persuaded that ParkingEye has shown grounds for assuming that a party who was in a position to bargain individually, and who was advised by a competent lawyer, would have agreed to the penalty clause as it stood.

315. Lord Neuberger and Lord Sumption in para 107 have substituted their judgment of reasonableness of the clause for the question whether the supplier could reasonably have assumed that the customer would have agreed with the term, and on that approach there is not much, if any, difference in substance from the test whether it offended the penalty doctrine at common law. That approach is consistent with their statement in para 104 that the considerations which show that it is not a penalty demonstrate also that it does not offend the Regulations. I consider that the approach waters down the test adopted by the CJEU and at the very least that the point is not acte clair.

316. Mr Beavis's argument that the clause was a penalty at common law is more questionable, but in the circumstances nothing would be gained by discussing that matter further.

== Significance ==
Commentators on the decision have noted that "these cases provide some welcome clarification to the law in this area", and that going forward "it seems that where parties have negotiated a contract, on a level playing field and with the assistance of professional advisors, it will now be much harder for the party paying liquidated damages to challenge the validity of those provisions on the basis that they are a penalty." Others have suggested that "in deciding to abandon the admittedly over-rigid categorisation of penalty clauses in Dunlop the Supreme Court has, in the course of explaining and updating the law in this fascinating decision, created some uncertainty in the commercial world."

=== Other impacts on equitable relief ===
In Shiloh Spinners Ltd v Harding, the House of Lords had held that the equitable remedy of relief from forfeiture was not "confined to any particular type of case". The Judicial Committee of the Privy Council subsequently affirmed that principle in Cukurova Finance International Ltd v Alfa Telecom Turkey Ltd, declaring "that relief from forfeiture is available in principle where what is in question is forfeiture of proprietary or possessory rights, as opposed to merely contractual rights, regardless of the type of property concerned". In Cavendish, the Supreme Court has extended relief to contractual provisions, such as forfeiture clauses, as noted by Lord Hodge:

227. ... There is no reason in principle why a contractual provision, which involves forfeiture of sums otherwise due, should not be subjected to the rule against penalties, if the forfeiture is wholly disproportionate either to the loss suffered by the innocent party or to another justifiable commercial interest which that party has sought to protect by the clause. If the forfeiture is not so exorbitant and therefore is enforceable under the rule against penalties, the court can then consider whether under English law it should grant equitable relief from forfeiture, looking at the position of the parties after the breach and the circumstances in which the contract was broken. This was the approach which Dillon LJ adopted in BICC plc v Burndy Corpn, and in which Ackner LJ concurred. The court risks no confusion if it asks first whether, as a matter of construction, the clause is a penalty and, if it answers that question in the negative, considers whether relief in equity should be granted having regard to the position of the parties after the breach.

This can be construed to hold that relief is available to circumvent the effect of time bar provisions that exist in some contracts, which can contain onerous notice provisions.

== See also ==
- Dunlop Pneumatic Tyre Co Ltd v New Garage & Motor Co Ltd
- European Union law
- English contract law
