= March law =

March law or marcher law is a system of legal compromises formerly in use in the border regions of England. Specifically, it may refer to:

- March law (Anglo-Irish border)
- March law (Anglo-Scottish border)
- March law (Anglo-Welsh border)

== See also ==
- April Laws, a series of laws passed by the Hungarian Diet in March 1848, and signed by the King in April of that year
