= Marcher =

Marcher may refer to:

- one who is marching
- one who takes part in a demonstration (political)
- anything pertaining to a march (territory), especially
  - the Welsh Marches
  - a Marcher Lord
  - March law
