= Unfair contract =

Unfair contract is a concept of some legal jurisdictions. It may refer to:

== English law ==
(see Unfair terms in English contract law)

- Unfair Terms in Consumer Contracts Regulations 1999
- Unfair Contract Terms Act 1977
- Consumer Protection from Unfair Trading Regulations 2008

== Australian law ==
- Australian Consumer Law

== See also ==
- Unconscionability, a similar, though much broader concept.
