= Unfair terms in English contract law =

Unfair terms in English contract law are regulated under three major pieces of legislation, compliance with which is enforced by the Competition and Markets Authority (CMA). The Unfair Contract Terms Act 1977 is the first main Act, which covers some contracts that have exclusion and limitation clauses. For example, it will not extend to cover contracts which are mentioned in Schedule I, consumer contracts, and international supply contracts. The Consumer Rights Act 2015 replaced the Unfair Terms in Consumer Contracts Regulations 1999 and bolstered further requirements for consumer contracts. The Consumer Protection from Unfair Trading Regulations 2008 concerns certain sales practices.

== History ==
The UK Parliament made its first comprehensive incursion into the doctrine of contractual freedom in the Unfair Contract Terms Act 1977. The topic of unfair terms is vast, and could equally include specific contracts falling under the Consumer Credit Act 1974, the Employment Rights Act 1996 or the Landlord and Tenant Act 1985. Legislation, particularly regarding consumer protection, has also frequently been updated by the European Union, in laws like the EU Airline Compensation Regulation, or the EU Electronic Commerce Directive, which were subsequently translated into domestic law through a statutory instrument authorised through the European Communities Act 1972 section 2(2), as for example with the Consumer Protection (Distance Selling) Regulations 2000. The primary legislation on unfair contract terms deriving from the EU is the Unfair Terms in Consumer Contracts Regulations 1999. Both UCTA 1977 and UTCCR 1999 cover similar ground and can give rise to concurrent claims. For this reason the Law Commission devised a draft Unfair Contract Terms Bill to unify the two in one document, and make protection for small business explicit, but Parliament has not acted yet.

The Competition and Markets Authority replaced the Office of Fair Trading as the UK regulator on 1 April 2014.

== Relevant legislation ==
=== Unfair Contract Terms Act 1977 ===
"None of you nowadays will remember the trouble we had - when I was called to the Bar - with exemption clauses. They were printed in small print on the back of tickets and order forms and invoices. They were contained in catalogues or timetables. They were held to be binding on any person who took them without objection. No one ever did object. He never read them or knew what was in them. No matter how unreasonable they were, he was bound. All this was done in the name of "freedom of contract." But the freedom was all on the side of the big concern which had the use of the printing press. No freedom for the little man who took the ticket or order form or invoice. The big concern said, "Take it or leave it". The little man had no option but to take it. The big concern could and did exempt itself from liability in its own interest without regard to the little man. It got away with it time after time. When the courts said to the big concern, "You must put it in clear words", the big concern had no hesitation in doing so. It knew well that the little man would never read the exemption clauses or understand them. It was a bleak winter for our law of contract."

— Lord Denning MR in George Mitchell (Chesterhall) Ltd v Finney Lock Seeds Ltd

The Unfair Contract Terms Act 1977 regulates clauses that exclude or limit terms implied by the common law or statute. Its general pattern is that if clauses restrict liability, particularly negligence, of one party, the clause must pass the "reasonableness test" in section 11 and Schedule 2. This looks at the ability of either party to get insurance, their bargaining power and their alternatives for supply, and a term's transparency. In places the Act goes further. Section 2(1) strikes down any term that would limit liability for a person's death or personal injury. Section 2(2) stipulates that any clause restricting liability for loss to property has to pass the "reasonableness test". One of the first cases, George Mitchell Ltd v Finney Lock Seeds Ltd saw a farmer successfully claim that a clause limiting the liability of a cabbage seed seller to damages for replacement seed, rather than the far greater loss of profits after crop failure, was unreasonable. The sellers were in a better position to get insurance for the loss than the buyers. Under section 3 businesses cannot limit their liability for breach of contract if they are dealing with "consumers", defined in section 12 as someone who is not dealing in the course of business with someone who is, or if they are using a written standard form contract, unless the term passes the reasonableness test. Section 6 states the implied terms of the Sale of Goods Act 1979 cannot be limited unless reasonable. If one party is a "consumer" then the SGA 1979 terms become compulsory. In other words, a business can never sell a consumer goods that do not work, even if the consumer signed a document with full knowledge of the exclusion clause. Under section 13, it is added that variations on straightforward exemption clauses will still count as exemption clauses caught by the Act. So for example, in Smith v Eric S Bush the House of Lords held that a surveyor's term limiting liability for negligence was ineffective, after the chimney came crashing through Mr Smith's roof. The surveyor could get insurance more easily than Mr Smith. Even though there was no contract between them, because section 1(1)(b) applies to any notice excluding liability for negligence, and even though the surveyor's exclusion clause might prevent a duty of care arising at common law, section 13 "catches" it if liability would exist "but for" the notice excluding liability: then the exclusion is potentially unfair.

=== Unfair Terms in Consumer Contracts Regulations 1999 ===
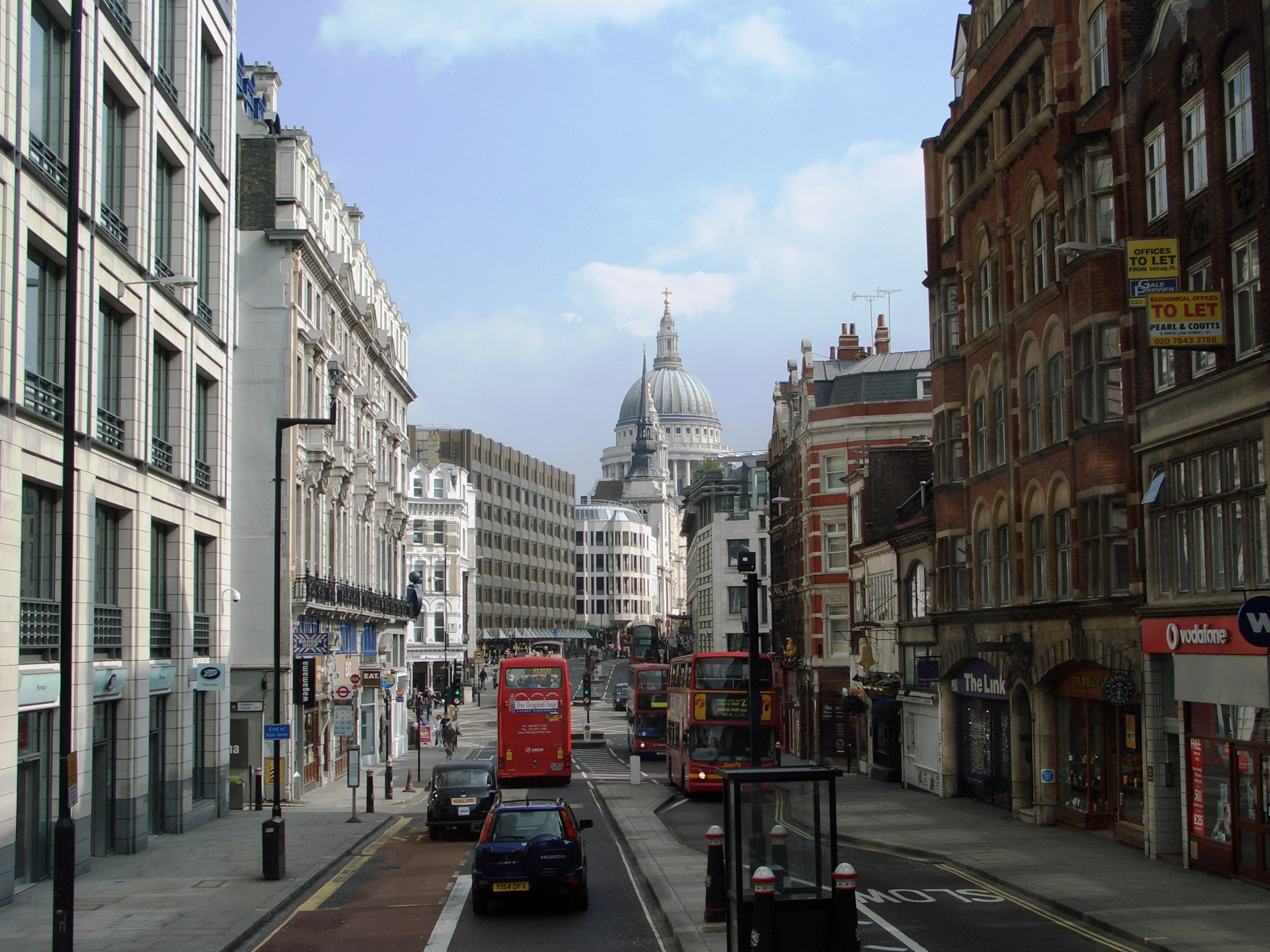
The Office of Fair Trading, just off Fleet Street, formerly had jurisdiction to take up consumer protection cases after receiving complaints.

Relatively few cases are ever brought directly by consumers, given the complexity of litigation, cost, and its worth if claims are small. In order to ensure consumer protection laws are actually enforced, the Office of Fair Trading has jurisdiction to bring consumer regulation cases on behalf of consumers after receiving complaints. Under the Unfair Terms in Consumer Contracts Regulations 1999 regulations 10–12, which follows the requirements of the Unfair Terms in Consumer Contracts Directive 93/13/EC the OFT has jurisdiction to collect and consider complaints, and then seek injunctions in the courts to stop businesses using unfair terms (under any legislation). The UTCCR 1999 are both broader than UCTA 1977 in that they cover any unfair terms, not just exemption clauses, but narrower in that they only operate for consumer contracts. The UTCCR 1999 definition of a consumer is also narrower, under regulation 3, where a consumer must be a natural person (and never a legal person, like a company) who contracts outside his business. However, while the United Kingdom could always opt for greater protection, when it translated the Directive into national law it opted to follow the bare minimum requirements, and not to cover every contract term. Under regulation 6(2), a court may only assess the fairness of terms which do not involve the "definition of the main subject matter of the contract", or terms which relate to "price or remuneration" of the thing sold. Outside such "core" terms, a term may be unfair, under regulation 5 if it is not one that is individually negotiated, and if contrary to good faith it causes a significant imbalance in the rights and obligations of the parties. A list of examples of unfair terms are set out in Schedule 2. In DGFT v First National Bank plc the House of Lords held that given the purpose of consumer protection, regulation 6(2) should be construed tightly and Lord Bingham stated good faith implies fair, open and honest dealing. This all meant that the bank's practice of charging its (higher) default interest rate to customers who had (lower) interest rate set by a court under a debt restructuring plan could, under regulation 6(2), be assessed for fairness, but that under regulation 5 the term did not create such an imbalance given the bank wished only to have its normal interest. This appeared to grant a relatively open role for the Office of Fair Trading to intervene against unfair terms. However, in OFT v Abbey National plc the Supreme Court held that if a term related in any way to price, it could not by virtue of regulation 6(2) be assessed for fairness. All the High Street banks, including Abbey National, had a practice of charging high fees if account holders, unplanned, exceeded through withdrawals their normal overdraft limit. Overturning a unanimous Court of Appeal, the Supreme Court viewed that if the thing being charged for was part of a "package" of services, and the bank's remuneration for its services partly came from these fees, then there could be no assessment of the fairness of terms. This controversial stance was tempered by their Lordships' emphasis that any charges must be wholly transparent, though its compatibility with EU law is not yet established by the European Court of Justice, and it appears questionable that it would be decided the same under the proposed Unfair Contract Terms Bill.

=== Consumer Protection from Unfair Trading Regulations 2008 ===
- Purely Creative Ltd v Office of Fair Trading [2011] EWCA Civ 920, Sir Andrew Morritt, Jackson LJ, Munby LJ made a reference to the ECJ on the Unfair Commercial Practices Directive 2005/29/EC, Annex I, para 3, implemented by the Consumer Protection from Unfair Trading Regulations 2008, asking whether traders were prohibited from informing consumers they had won a prize when they were invited to incur any cost to claim the prize.

=== Consumer Rights Act 2015 ===
This act amends the law relating to the rights of consumers and protection of their interests including laying out unfair terms in contracts. It makes further provision about investigatory powers for enforcing the regulation of traders, makes provision about private actions in competition law and the Competition Appeal Tribunal. Some contract terms are "blacklisted" by the Act, meaning that even without further assessment they will never be enforced. Other terms which have the potential to be considered unfair are included within a "grey list".

== Guidance ==
Guidance on unfair contract terms, and on how businesses can ensure that the contract terms they propose to use are fair, is issued by the Competition & Markets Authority.

== See also ==
- Consumer protection in the United Kingdom
- Sale of Goods Act 1979
- English contract law
- Penal damages
- Good faith
- Unfair terms in Irish contract law
- United States contract law
- German contract law
- French contract law
- European contract law (see in particular Principles of European Contract Law Arts 4:107, 4:116 and 4:117, which are not law per se)
