= Unfair terms in Irish contract law =

Unfair terms in Irish contract law generally refer to terms in contracts that provide an unreasonable imbalance, usually to the detriment of the consumer, in consumer and other contracts. These unfair terms are provided by common law and more recent statute, most notably Consumer Protection Act 2007 and the European Communities (Unfair Terms in Consumer Contracts) Regulations 1995.

== Consumer Protection Act 2007 ==
The Consumer Protection Act 2007 prohibits numerous unfair practices regarding the formation and implementation of contracts, such as misleading pricing, misleading advertising, aggressive practices and deceptive practices, et al. Most notably, Part 3: Commercial Practices covers:

- Chapter 1: Unfair Commercial Practices
- Chapter 2: Misleading Commercial Practices
- Chapter 3: Aggressive Commercial Practices
- Chapter 4: Prohibited Commercial Practices

== European Communities (Unfair Terms in Consumer Contracts) Regulations, 1995 ==
The above regulations make general provisions between a seller of goods and a supplier of services in a commercial setting (i.e. not between two individuals) and where the contract was not individually negotiated.

The regulations lay out what are unfair terms in contracts, those that are unenforceable, good-faith tests and misleading commercial practices.

A non-exhaustive list of unfair terms in consumer contracts provided by Schedule 3 would be terms which have the object or effect of:

( a ) excluding or limiting the legal liability of a seller or supplier in the event of the death of a consumer or personal injury to the latter resulting from an act or omission of that seller or supplier;

( b ) inappropriately excluding or limiting the legal rights of the consumer vis-a-vis the seller or supplier or another party in the event of total or partial non-performance or inadequate performance by the seller or supplier of any of the contractual obligations, including the option of offsetting a debt owed to the seller or supplier against any claim which the consumer may have against him;

( c ) making an agreement binding on the consumer whereas provision of services by the seller or supplier is subject to a condition whose realization depends on his own will alone;

( d ) permitting the seller or supplier to retain sums paid by the consumer where the latter decides not to conclude or perform the contract, without providing for the consumer to receive compensation of an equivalent amount from the seller or supplier where the latter is the party cancelling the contract;

( e ) requiring any consumer who fails to fulfil his obligation to pay a disproportionately high sum in compensation;

( f ) authorizing the seller or supplier to dissolve the contract on a discretionary basis where the same facility is not granted to the consumer, or permitting the seller or supplier to retain the sums paid for services not yet supplied by him where it is the seller or supplier himself who dissolves the contract;

( g ) enabling the seller or supplier to terminate a contract of indeterminate duration without reasonable notice except where there are serious grounds for doing so;

( h ) automatically extending a contract of fixed duration where the consumer does not indicate otherwise, when the deadline fixed for the consumer to express this desire not to extend the contract is unreasonably early;

( i ) irrevocably binding the consumer to terms with which he had no real opportunity of becoming acquainted before the conclusion of the contract;

( j ) enabling the seller or supplier to alter the terms of the contract unilaterally without a valid reason which is specified in the contract;

( k ) enabling the seller or supplier to alter unilaterally without a valid reason any characteristics of the product or service to be provided;

( l ) providing for the price of goods to be determined at the time of delivery or allowing a seller of goods or supplier of services to increase their price without in both cases giving the consumer the corresponding right to cancel the contract if the final price is too high in relation to the price agreed when the contract was concluded;

( m ) giving the seller or supplier the right to determine whether the goods or services supplied are in conformity with the contract, or giving him the exclusive right to interpret any term of the contract;

( n ) limiting the seller's or supplier's obligation to respect commitments undertaken by his agents or making his commitments subject to compliance with a particular formality;

( o ) obliging the consumer to fulfil all his obligations where the seller or supplier does not perform his;

( p ) giving the seller or supplier the possibility of transferring his rights and obligations under the contract, where this may serve to reduce the guarantees for the consumer, without the latter's agreement;

( q ) excluding or hindering the consumer's right to take legal action or exercise any other legal remedy, particularly by requiring the consumer to take disputes exclusively to arbitration not covered by legal provisions, unduly restricting the evidence available to him or imposing on him a burden of proof which, according to the applicable law, should lie with another party to the contract.

== Penalty clauses ==
Although generally prohibited through the Consumer Protection Act, through inheriting the common law of England and Wales, Irish common law also contains provisions against penalty clauses in contracts. This has been most recently upheld via the following case law:

- ACC Bank plc v Friends First Management Pension Funds Limited [2012]
- Flynn & Anor v Breccia [2018] IECA 273
- Sheehan v Breccia & Ors [2018] IECA 286

== Consumer Rights Act 2022 ==
The Consumer Rights Act 2022 provided further remediation between consumers and traders in the form of a right of repair, incorrect installation of goods, right to withhold payments, implied terms of contracts and other remedies, etc.

== See also ==
- Penalty clause
- Consumer Law
- Contract Law
- Law of the Republic of Ireland
- Unfair terms in English contract law
- Law of England
- Common law
