= Dunlop Pneumatic Tyre Co Ltd v New Garage & Motor Co Ltd =

English contract law case

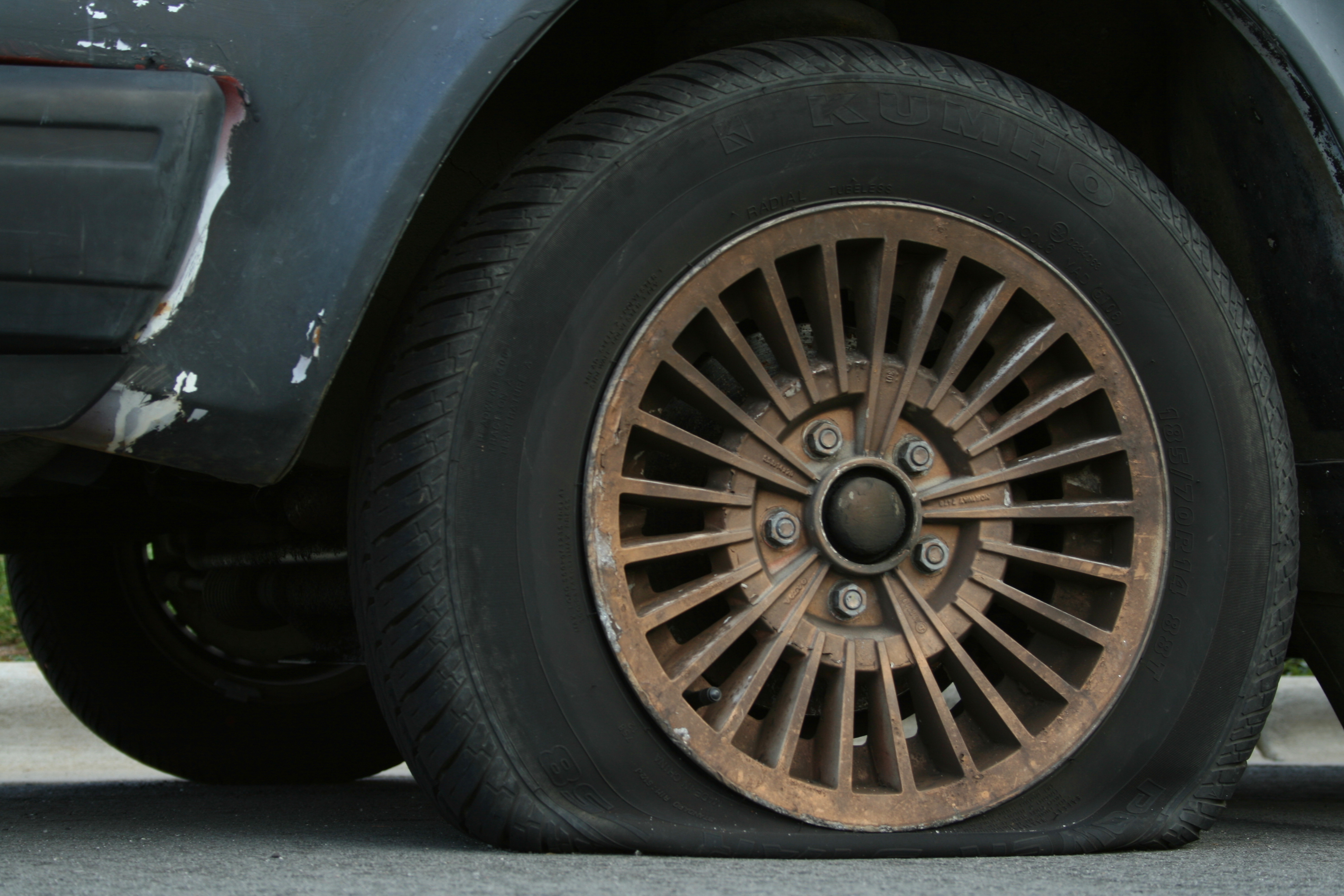
- Court: House of Lords
- Decided: July 1, 1914
- Citations: [1914] UKHL 1, [1915] AC 79

Keywords
- Termination, penalty clause

Dunlop Pneumatic Tyre Co Ltd v New Garage & Motor Co Ltd [1914] UKHL 1 (1 July 1914) is an English contract law case, concerning the extent to which damages may be sought for failure to perform of a contract when a sum is fixed in a contract. It held that only if a sum is of an unconscionable amount will it be considered penal and unenforceable. The legal standing of this case has been superseded by the Supreme Court's 2015 ruling in the combined cases of Cavendish Square Holding BV v Talal El Makdessi and ParkingEye Ltd v Beavis.

The case should not be confused with Dunlop Pneumatic Tyre Co Ltd v Selfridge & Co Ltd, which held that the same resale price maintenance practice was unenforceable against a third party reseller as a matter of the English rule of privity of contract.

== Facts ==
Dunlop sued its tyre retailer, New Garage, for breaching an agreement to not resell Dunlop tyres at a price lower than that listed in the contract. The agreement then said if that did happen, New Garage would pay £5 per tyre 'by way of liquidated damages and not as a penalty'.

The judge held the £5 sum was liquidated damages and enforceable. The Court of Appeal held by a majority that the clause was a penalty and Dunlop could only obtain nominal damages. Dunlop appealed.

== Judgment ==
The House of Lords held the clause was not a penalty, and merely a genuine pre-estimate of Dunlop’s potential loss, and so Dunlop could enforce the agreement. Lord Dunedin set out the following principles.

To assist this task of construction various tests have been suggested, which if applicable to the case under consideration may prove helpful, or even conclusive. Such are:

( a ) It will be held to be penalty if the sum stipulated for is extravagant and unconscionable in amount in comparison with the greatest loss that could conceivably be proved to have followed from the breach. (Illustration given by Lord Halsbury in Clydebank Case).
( b ) It will be held to be a penalty if the breach consists only in not paying a sum of money, and the sum stipulated is a sum greater than the sum which ought to have been paid (Kemble v Farren). This though one of the most ancient instances is truly a corollary to the last test. Whether it had its historical origin in the doctrine of the common law that when A. promised to pay B. a sum of money on a certain day and did not do so, B. could only recover the sum with, in certain cases, interest, but could never recover further damages for non-timeous payment, or whether it was a survival of the time when equity reformed unconscionable bargains merely because they were unconscionable, - a subject which much exercised Jessel MR in Wallis v Smith - is probably more interesting than material.
( c ) There is a presumption (but no more) that it is penalty when "a single lump sum is made payable by way of compensation, on the occurrence of one or more or all of several events, some of which may occasion serious and others but trifling damage" (Lord Watson in Lord Elphinstone v Monkland Iron and Coal Co).

On the other hand:

( d ) It is no obstacle to the sum stipulated being a genuine pre-estimate of damage, that the consequences of the breach are such as to make precise pre-estimation almost an impossibility. On the contrary, that is just the situation when it is probable that pre-estimated damage was the true bargain between the parties (Clydebank Case, Lord Halsbury; Webster v Bosanquet, Lord Mersey).

Turning now to the facts of the case, it is evident that the damage apprehended by the appellants owing to the breaking of the agreement was an indirect and not a direct damage. So long as they got their price from the respondents for each article sold, it could not matter to them directly what the respondents did with it. Indirectly it did. Accordingly, the agreement is headed "Price Maintenance Agreement", and the way in which the appellants would be damaged if prices were cut is clearly explained in evidence by Mr. Baisley, and no successful attempt is made to controvert that evidence. But though damage as a whole from such a practice would be certain, yet damage from any one sale would be impossible to forecast. It is just, therefore, one of those cases where it seems quite reasonable for parties to contract that they should estimate that damage at a certain figure, and provided that figure is not extravagant there would seem no reason to suspect that it is not truly a bargain to assess damages, but rather a penalty to be held in terrorem.

== Legal overhaul ==
The "leading case" status of this ruling was superseded by the Supreme Court of the United Kingdom in a 2015 ruling in the combined cases of Cavendish Square Holding BV v Talal El Makdessi and ParkingEye Ltd v Beavis. These appeals, which raised similar legal issues, gave the Supreme Court an opportunity to review the law on penalties based on Dunlop. Lord Neuberger, President of the Supreme Court, observed at the commencement of his joint judgment with Lord Sumption, a justice of the court:

The penalty rule in England is an ancient, haphazardly constructed edifice which has not weathered well, and which in the opinion of some should simply be demolished, and in the opinion of others should be reconstructed and extended. For many years, the courts have struggled to apply standard tests formulated more than a century ago for relatively simple transactions to altogether more complex situations.

== See also ==
- Penalty clause
- Cavendish Square Holdings BV v Makdessi
- Unfair Terms in Consumer Contracts Regulations 1999
