= Unfair contract terms =

Unfair contract terms may refer to:

- The European Union's Unfair Terms in Consumer Contracts Directive 1993
- Unfair terms in English contract law
