= Unfair Contract Terms Bill =

The Unfair Contract Terms Bill (Law Com 292) is a proposed act of Parliament of the United Kingdom, which would consolidate two existing pieces of consumer protection legislation, the Unfair Contract Terms Act 1977 and the Unfair Terms in Consumer Contracts Regulations 1999 into one act. It would resolve existing ambiguities, and eliminate overlapping provisions, but also slightly raise consumer protection standards in favour of small businesses.

== Developments ==
In the end, the UK government followed many of the proposals in the Unfair Contract Terms Bill. But instead Parliament created a separate Consumer Rights Act 2015, and left the Unfair Contract Terms Act 1977 in place, with consumer rights removed.

== See also ==
- English contract law
- Unfair Contract Terms Act 1977
- Unfair Terms in Consumer Contracts Regulations 1999
