= Law of Ireland =

Law of Ireland or Irish law may refer to:

- Early Irish law (Brehon law) of medieval Gaelic Ireland
- March Law of British rule in Ireland and before 1707 English rule
- Alternative law in Ireland prior to 1921
- Law of the Republic of Ireland and its predecessor the Irish Free State since 1922
- Law of Northern Ireland since 1921
