= March law (Anglo-Scottish border) =

System of customary international law

March law (Anglo-Scottish border) (or Marcher law, or laws and customs of the marches) was a system of customary international law dealing with cross-border dispute settlement, operating during the medieval and early-modern periods in the area of the Anglo-Scottish border or Anglo-Scottish marches. The word "march" is the Old English form of the Old French word "marche" meaning "boundary", and its use was not unique to the Anglo-Scottish border - the Anglo-Welsh border and the Anglo-Irish marches had their own versions of "the Law of the Marches". They were "essentially a set of regulations for the prosecution of offences committed by the inhabitants of one country inside the territory of the other, and for the recovery of property stolen or lent across their common border".

The laws were administered (from the late thirteenth-century onwards) by the Wardens of the Marches in times of war between England and Scotland, and by "conservators of the truce" in times of peace, although, given that periods of truce were invariably subject to cross-border raiding, piracy and ransom-taking, the two roles were often amalgamated into that of "warden-conservator". The work of the courts was done at periodic gatherings of plaintiffs and defendants, along with the designated warden-conservators and the jurors ("recognitors") from both England and Scotland, at a pre-decided place either side of the border line on what were called "days of march" (or "days of truce").

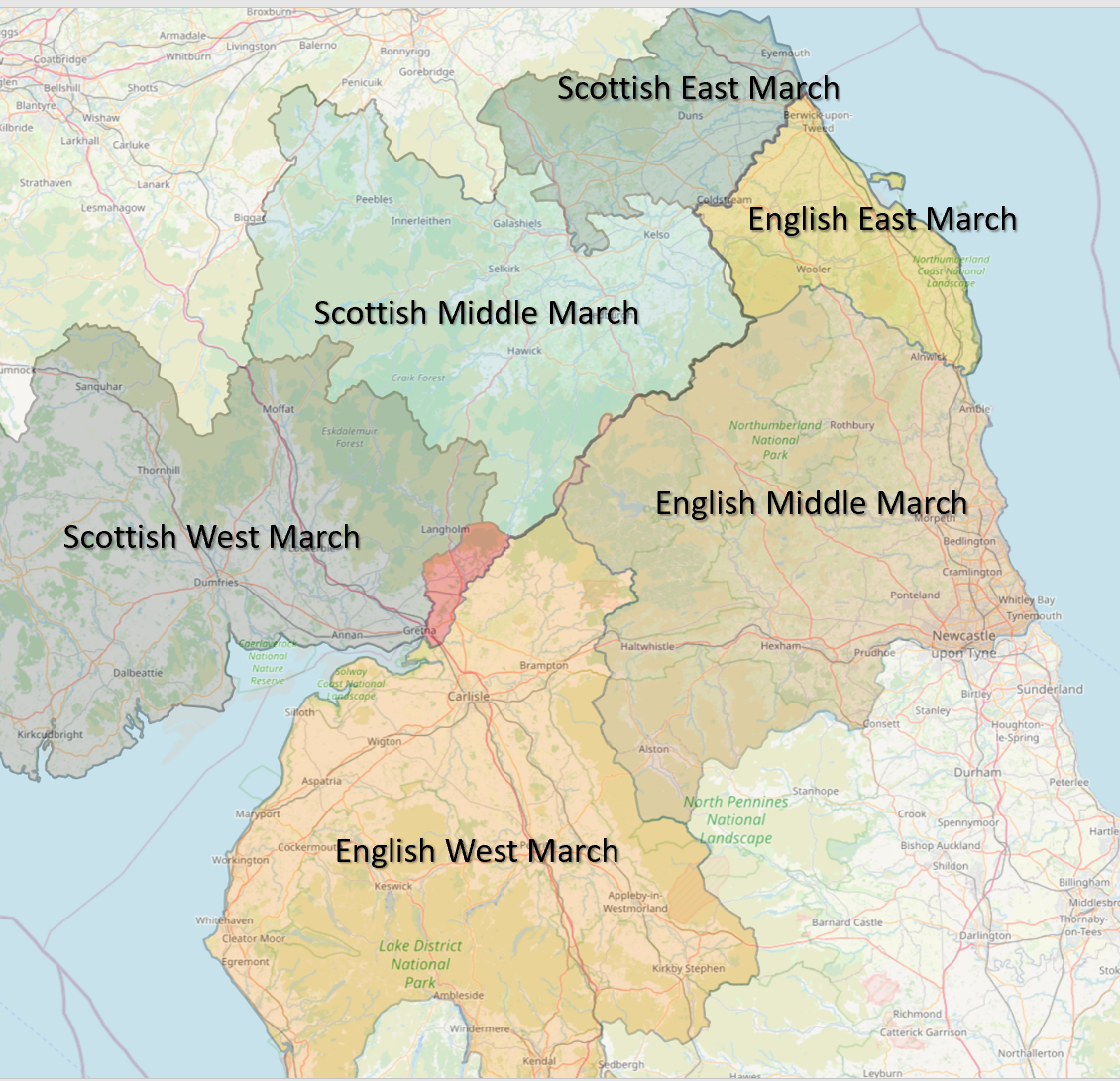
Anglo-Scottish Marches

In England, March law ran side-by-side with English common law, often in an unclear way (and with the latter sometimes being subverted by the Wardens to their own ends). As well as common law, March Law had elements of equity and military law in its make-up.

March law was usually most in force during times of truce, as, during times of war with the Scots, the English Crown, claiming sovereignty over Scottish territory, would refuse to recognise a separate judicial entity in Scotland.

== Background ==
From the First War of Scottish Independence to 1603 and the Union of the Crowns, the borderlands of England and Scotland suffered from armed raids and open warfare. The warfare was driven by the attempts of the English crown to claim suzerainty over Scotland and the consequent resistance of the Scottish crown. In addition, the Scottish Crown would often support the French in the latter's wars with England (the "auld alliance"). The raiding was due to armed bands of local magnates, lairds or clan chiefs and their retainers (the border reivers) on both sides of the Anglo-Scottish border (including sometimes the Wardens' own men) crossing the border to take captives and/or animals and wreak damage on property.

Because of the threat of war and/or raiding, it simply was not worth local people raising crops or animals with any expectation of keeping hold of them; the result was that clans on both sides of the border, especially in the more remote regions, became mobile or semipermanent residents, stealing others' crops and animals in order to feed themselves.

The lack of effective Royal landholding in the region, plus the difficulties in getting to the remote regions concerned, meant that peacekeeping power was devolved to the great northern families who were themselves often in conflict with the Crown and with each other. Compensation paid to victims was defrayed out of the magnates' own pockets, so this meant that they had an interest in using raiding to claw back their expenses.

The result was devastation for local people on either side of the border for three hundred years. Raids and retaliatory raiding took place regularly even during times of formal truce between the two countries. Access to justice for victims, especially as regards compensation, was virtually impossible via the normal legal methods. Felons simply crossed the border to escape capture and to evade the relevant legal system that would have applied to the local inhabitants. There was no compensation or restitution available either under existing law. Hence the need for an alternative – the March law.

== Origins ==
The origins of March law are obscure and have been the subject of some dispute. The (first) codification of 1249 (when twelve knights, six each from England and Scotland, convened on the border to write down "the laws and customs of the march" at the instigation of Henry III of England and Alexander II of Scotland) seems to refer to practices dating back some time. Some historians have suggested pre-Norman origins; others have said that there is a mixture of pre-Norman and post-Norman elements in the code.

The 1249 text has articles concerning: the proclaiming of the alleged offence on both sides of the border; the use of pledges to ensure that the plaintiffs and defendants turned up at the day of march; the use of jurors from both kingdoms; the payment of compensation to victims (such as "manbote" as regards murder); the method of proof in contested disputes (usually judicial duel or "wager of battle", known as "handwarcelle"); and the guarantee of sanctuary to those who confessed. Eleven of the thirteen clauses were concerned with apprehending offenders; the types of offences were not listed, but were probably to do with acts against the person and property.

The border disputes of the thirteenth century (before the setting-up of the Wardenial system) were usually settled, if the plaintiffs decided against using common law, by an enquiry made by the sheriff. The use of English common law or Chancery writs was a competing system of justice in the borders.

== Later developments ==
=== March law in the 14th century ===
With the coming to power of Edward I of England and the almost continuous warfare due to the Scottish Wars of Independence, March law was effectively put into abeyance until the middle of the fourteenth-century. The beginning of the First War of Scottish Independence in 1296 saw the establishment of the system of Wardens and Conservators mentioned above. At first, the judicial capacity of the Wardens was restricted to matters of military import (e.g. arresting those attempting to evade military service). However, the 1320s saw the Conservators, in times of peace, take on the judicial role that had previously belonged to the sheriffs.

Initially - in England at least - the Marches were initially referred to the counties they overlaid with, West March was known initially as Cumberland and Westmorland March. Until 1381, with the death of the last Umfraville earl of Angus, there was Northumberland march which became known as East March in 1345. Following the Liberty of Tynedale reverting to England, the Middle March was created.

Following this Edward III wanted to keep the peace on the Scottish border while he was involved in France, the Wardens were given the Conservators' judicial functions in addition to their own military ones. The Wardens' courts operated in tandem with common law ones, and were held in addition to those at the days of truce.

Edward III made further attempts to involve the Crown with border law, and to regularise its machinery. He appointed Thomas Beauchamp, 11th Earl of Warwick to join the Wardens as their supervisor; the 1367 commission included the requirement to have a quorum (of two) on the judicial bench; days of march were agreed on in advance; felons were required to be presented by English and Scottish juries before being sent before the Warden and a mixed tribunal (assuming not yet proven guilty); the guilty had to make restitution within fifteen days (if they had no goods to hand over and no lord to vouch for them, they were set to ransom); sheriffs were told to assist the Wardens in capturing suspects who had taken flight; for the first time, lesser nobility were brought into the system as conservators.

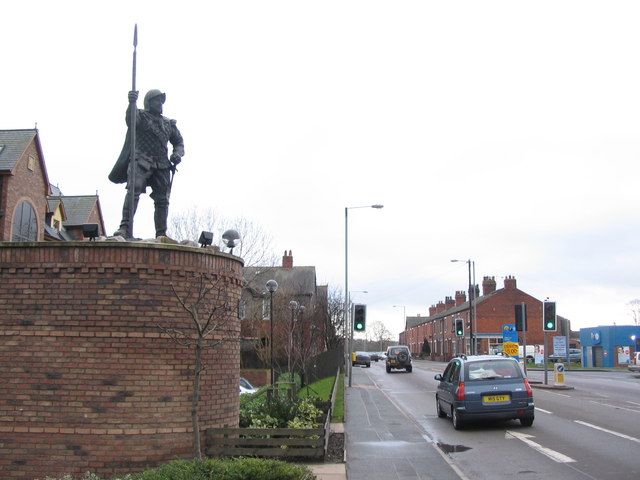
A Border Reiver, statue in Carlisle

Richard II's reign saw a failed attempt by the English Crown to lessen the power of the northern magnates and to manipulate their hold on the Wardenships (the Wardens becoming paid officers by the end of the 1380s) and it also saw intensive cross-border raiding and destruction. However, the use of border law was strengthened, perhaps because the region fell more closely under the influence of the Wardens (particularly the Percys and Nevilles in England and the Douglas family in Scotland). For example, the problem of felons fleeing to the various liberties, where the King's writ did not run, was partially solved by making the lord of one of the largest of them (the Bishop of Durham who held the Liberty of Durham) Warden of the East March. Distraining ('poinding') was abolished in 1386 as being unworkable, and responsibility for compensation was given to the Wardens alone.

The indenture relating to the truce of 1386 between the English and Scots clarified the types of offences against truces that would be subject to border law. These included: homicide, the carrying off of persons, ransom-taking, the taking of castles, fortresses and walled towns, armed and mounted raids, and cattle reiving (theft). In 1397, it was agreed that written bills of complaint would be submitted by plaintiffs before being forwarded to the conservators of both countries.

By the end of the fourteenth century, it has been argued, March law "had achieved the status of a system of law, complete with a hallowed and proven tradition, a body of written record, and a legitimate purpose" and "both complemented and supplemented the working of English common law".

=== March law in the 15th century ===
However, the reigns of Henry IV of England and Henry V of England saw the revival of Edward I's claim over Scotland, and March law went into abeyance once more. In addition, the revolts of the Percys against the Crown, as well as feuds amongst the border Wardens, meant that border law was not championed, despite the pleas made by John of Lancaster, 1st Duke of Bedford to his father to reinstate the days of march. The borderers suffered much deprivation due to cross-border raiding and recourse to the common law failed to bring any restitution, even when the justices were present to hold the assizes.

The reign of Henry VI of England saw a revival in March law as the regime sought to ally itself with Scotland. The truce of 1424 between the two countries resurrected the border tribunals. It sought to ban all reprisals; when these took place the offenders had to seek negotiation before the Wardens. Seeking redress for cross-border felonies would from now on be done in the Wardenial courts (as opposed to being dealt with at the tribunals set up at the days of march).

The indentures agreed in 1429, between the English commissioners sent as envoys to Scotland and the Scottish representatives, laid the foundation for fifteenth-century border law. The nature of the offences to be dealt with by border law was enumerated: "homicide, mayhem ('manyheing'), assault, breach of safe conduct, theft of animals and chattels, the unlawful grazing and pasturing of animals and treason." Procedures were laid down; for example, amongst other provisions, suspects who had attacked people moving under safe conduct were to be handed over to the Wardens of the opposite realm for punishment; challenges made by defendants were to be submitted to a mixed English and Scottish jury; English jurors were to be nominated by the Scots and vice versa; a kind of extradition system was devised; days of march were to have clerks available to make written records of proceedings; goods stolen by raiders from the opposite side of the border but found on the victim's side were to be argued over at a future day of march. If the accused was found innocent, the person taken with the goods had to forfeit them and seek compensation for the loss at a day of march. A second indenture covered the method of dealing with losses due to piracy (as vexatious a problem as that of land-based theft). On land, it set up a mechanism of establishing 'proofs' using men versed in the law and local men of standing (from England and Scotland) as jurors who established the facts of cases before they were presented to the cross-border tribunals. The provisions in the 1429 indentures were the first real attempt to bring the Anglo-Scottish border into the ambit of international law, rather than relying on the ad hoc, intermittent activity of local magnates (the Warden-Conservators).

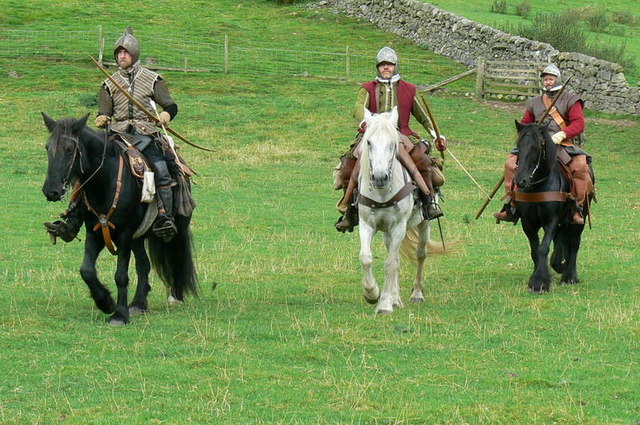
Well Armed Raiders. Photo: Malcolm Carruthers

In 1451, arrangements were made to bring March law closer to English practice in the courts of Admiralty and Chivalry, in that Scottish plaintiffs could now take their cases to the Chancellor of England if English wrongdoers failed to turn up at the border tribunals. Other provisions led to the closer supervision of the Warden-Conservators by their respective governments.

The grip of families such as the Percys and Nevilles on the wardenships meant that the wardenial courts were busier than ever and competing with, and beating, the common law courts for business.

Edward IV took advantage of the Scots' reluctance to support Henry VI to maintain the relatively favourable conditions in which March law had been operating. The provisions concerning March law laid out in the truce documents of 1464 were not much more than a reiteration of those of 1457 that Henry VI and James II had signed. Border law worked even with the coming back into power (briefly) of Henry VI and the accession of James III of Scotland. In 1473, new procedures for dealing with cross-border homicides were instituted, along with a limit on the number of retainers that could be invited to the days of march (which often ended in riotous behaviour, in part due to the sheer numbers of opposing armed bands). The war between England and Scotland of 1480–1484 put the border courts into abeyance once more, but Edward did not want them dismantled and his successor, Richard III of England, despite his enmity towards the Scots, revived them.

In 1484, Richard and James made an attempt (like many monarchs before them) to lessen the power of their 'over-mighty subjects' in the border lands by separating the wardenial work from that of the Conservators of the truce. The indenture signed between them made the Wardens strictly responsible for military operations, but the chasing down and prosecution of criminals in the borders remained in the hands of 'lesser' lords who had intimate knowledge of local affairs.

=== March law, 1485–1603 ===
Despite the animosity between Henry VII of England and James IV of Scotland, as well as the reluctance of the borderers themselves to agree to any truce between the two countries, March law continued to be used during the late fifteenth century and early sixteenth century. The Treaty of Ayton of 1497 had provisions for border law and its administration, particularly concerning the apprehending and safe keeping of march-related suspects. The treaty of peace and marriage of 1502 had clauses related to how the Wardens or their deputies should notify their opposite march officials within ten days of the arrest of suspects and of the charges against the latter. Those charged with homicide were to be taken to a day of march, and if convicted by a mixed English and Scottish panel, were to be handed over to the appropriate Warden for punishment (the death penalty). Limited raids of reprisals were allowed, both on land and at sea. The Crowns were to supervise the days of march rigorously and local men and civil lawyers would be appointed as conservators.

On the English side, Henry continued the practice of Richard III who had been awarded the wardenship of the West march when Duke of Gloucester, and, on becoming King, had retained the title of Warden, appointing a lieutenant or deputy-warden to do the work. From now on, Wardenships were to be held by royal princes and the lieutenants were to be drawn from the ranks of the lesser gentry (such as the Dacres). Done to save expense, as well as to reduce the power of the great northern magnates, this act saw the beginning of the end of the wardenship as it had been previously and the rise of the Council of the North to prominence cemented this development.

March law continued under Henry's Tudor successors, only being abolished when the Union of the Crowns took place and James VI of Scotland and I of England dealt a final blow to the Border reivers. The Bishop of Carlisle, William Nicolson, in his 1705 compilation of treaties called Leges Marchiarum that dealt with border law, included those of 1533 (Henry VIII); 1549 (Edward VI); 1553 (Mary I); 1563 and 1596 (both of Elizabeth I). Examples of the administration of March law during the sixteenth-century are given by Fraser.

== March law and English common law ==
March law persisted in use on the Anglo-Scottish border, often against the wishes of English monarchs, (Edward I, for example, attempted to abolish it in favour of a uniform common law system), for several reasons.

Firstly, although there was a northern assize circuit in operation in mediaeval times, "as the kings of England quickly learned after 1237, the substantive and procedural rules of the common law were ill-equipped to cope with the problems attendant on the establishment of an artificial political boundary." In particular, it was impossible to use the common law procedures to obtain redress and reparation from those who gave allegiance to another country.

In addition, the constant warfare or threat of warfare, as well as the threat of armed raiders, meant that justices were reluctant to travel north to carry out their duties.

Additional factors for the longevity of a separate border law include: the possible existence of a discrete "borderland" province, where allegiances were not so much to the distant centres of government but were more local in nature (Strathclyde British, Norse, Angles, Scots, Anglo-Saxon and Normans had all contributed to the border area's mix of peoples); the fluidity of the border itself; the lack of royal landholding in the borders leading to a reliance on local magnates, such as the Percies and Douglases, who were given quasi-judicial power as Warden-Conservators and who filled a judicial vacuum in the area.

Despite these factors, however, March law was seen by the monarchs of the two countries as being supplemental to their respective domestic law, and not as a substitute for the latter. In England, the common law still operated alongside March law during the whole period.

== March law and Scots law ==
Neville makes a case for Scottish legal practice (or Scottish custom at least) having more of an influence on the development of March law than English common law, claiming March law to be "a system of law that drew heavily, if not primarily, on Scottish legal practices".

For example, the use of "hand and horne" (also known as "hot and cold trod" from the fifteenth century on) in the pursuit of stolen goods, which was similar to the English hue and cry but permitting the crossing of borders, was a Scottish custom. Similarly, trial by combat remained a feature of Scottish, and border, practice when its use was declining in England, and the use of mixed (English and Scottish) juries "approximated Scottish legal practice more closely than they did those of English juries". The use of pledges and sureties ("inborch" and "utborch"), reparation by a convicted person ("assythment"), and the use of distraint, known as "poinding" in the borders, were all Scottish features.

== Days of march: practicalities ==
The indentures to the truce of 1398 stipulate that days of march (also known as "days of truce") should be held monthly. However, this was never adhered to, for a number of reasons: the hostility of the new Lancastrian regime put border law into abeyance soon after the indenture was signed, and the increase of violence amongst the border magnates (particularly between the Percy and Douglas families) disrupted the workings of the law. In later times, it may simply have been that mutual dislike between the opposing Wardens, or political tactics, was enough to cause extensive delays.

In terms of the places designated for the days of truce, most seem to have been, by the sixteenth century, on the Scottish side of the border line. However, prior to that century, various favourite places were used and included Hadden Stank, Redden Burn, and Lochmaben in the Scottish West marches (plus Gretna, Dumfries and Lilliot Cross occasionally). In the Scottish middle march, Cocklaw near Roxburgh and Redeswire (Carter Bar) were used. In the English West march, the Sands (in Carlisle), Rockcliffe and Kershopefoot were used and in the East, Norham, Coldstream, Wark, Ebchester and Berwick-upon-Tweed were mentioned in the records.

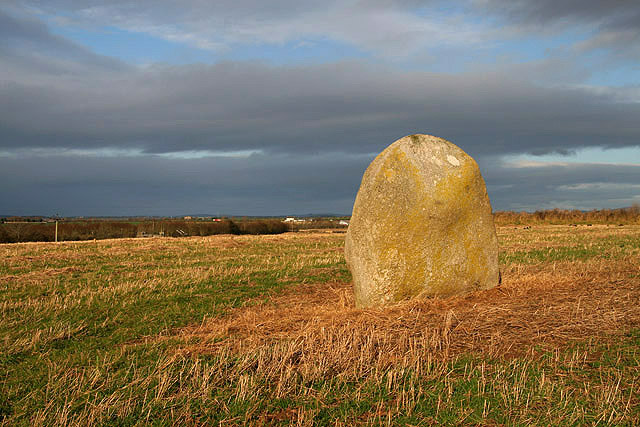
The Lochmaben Stone, a meeting-place for truces on the Border

Once the place and date had been arranged, and the elaborate precautions taken at the coming together of the two sides, the bills of complaint against those of the opposite nation were presented to the Warden of one's own March. These were then passed on to the Warden of the opposite March and the accused were summoned and those to face punishment were presented. Bills were 'fouled' (a guilty verdict given), 'cleared' (an innocent verdict), or 'fouled conditionally' (an assumption of guilt because the accused had failed to turn up).

The truce period was supposed to last until the sunrise of the day following the end of the day, or days, of truce, although occasionally this did not happen (as with the taking by the English of Kinmont Willie at the breaking up of a truce day at Kershopefoot in 1596).

== Purpose and effectiveness ==
=== Purpose ===
Ostensibly, March law was used as a dispute settlement procedure. However, the days of march and the use of March law also had a political and diplomatic dimension.

At a time when raiding across the border and fighting between armed bands threatened to escalate into open warfare between the two countries, the use of days of march and March law was useful in defusing the situation. In negotiations between the two countries, truce-time infringements were discussed in an effort to smooth the rocky diplomatic road. This linking of national and local concerns at "great days of march" (when ambassadors might be present as well as the Warden-Conservators) was a deliberate ploy from Edward III's time onwards.

In addition, the irregular contact between the Wardens of both sides helped to maintain a "back channel" between the two Crowns.

March law did not stop raiding across the border between England and Scotland, but it did offer a safety valve that prevented such raids from breaking out into open warfare between the two countries. It was most effective when there was a truce between the realms and least effective during times of war. It was the only mechanism available that offered any chance of compensation for losses and the apprehending of cross-border fugitives.

=== Effectiveness ===
The effectiveness of March law depended heavily on the energy and probity of the Warden-Conservators and their deputies (many of both of which were in league with the reivers). An example of the continual problem (almost the continual impossibility) of enforcing the law is given in the preamble to the 1563 indenture, which bemoans the "negligence of some officers, and lack of due execution of the laws and orders of the said marches of both the realms". Frustration and vendettas sometimes led to lynch law, outside the ambit of March law, an example being King James V's order to hang Johnnie Armstrong and his followers without trial in 1530.

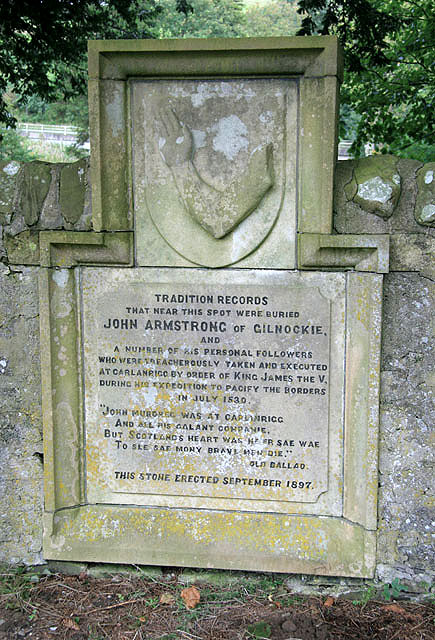
Memorial to Johnnie Armstrong

Although Neville lays emphasis on the mixed jury of English and Scottish, Fraser shows how, in the sixteenth-century at least, bills of complaint brought to the days of march could also be settled by the process of 'avower' (an 'avower' being a "countryman of the accused's, acceptable as a referee to both plaintiff and defendant, who would swear to the truth of the case"). The third method of determining the result was by the Warden's oath (where the Warden declared, on his honour, that the case was a valid one) All three methods were open to abuse: the avower might be in a feud with someone and not impartial; an accused could be quit of the charge merely by means of an oath of innocence; witnesses or the defendants sometimes simply did not turn up to the day of march (despite penalties for not doing so); the Wardens tried to maintain a balance of reparations between Scots and English, and this meant that lesser cases did not get heard; intimidation by the reivers' armed members present at the day of march must have been another factor.

It is difficult to know just how many bills of complaint were put forward to the Wardens as a proportion of the actual victims of raiding. An alternative was to instigate a "hot trod" (within six days of the offence taking place, otherwise it became a "cold trod"). This was a lawful posse of men who had the right under the trod rules to recover stolen property and to even cross the border in doing so. The trod was fraught with danger as those taking part were sometimes ambushed by the ones being pursued and the opportunities for double dealing were large. A third alternative, to execute a reprisal raid on the original raiders, was equally dangerous. It may be, therefore, that those who used March law and the days of march were those who did not have sufficient allies and family members to carry out a trod or reprisal.

An indication, perhaps, of the ineffectiveness of March law was the addition of judicial powers during the sixteenth century, when conditions seemed to have deteriorated markedly across the Marches. There were three types of ways in which judicial action was removed from the ambit of March law: armed judicial expeditions sanctioned by the monarch (usually the Scottish one), Warden-led reprisals officially sanctioned and carried out across the borderline ('Warden rodes'), and, thirdly, encouraging (or not discouraging) reivers to undertake their own reprisals (this was illegal in terms of March law, of course).

Given the kinship ties between the border 'clans' (across the border line as well as either side of it), which meant that the Wardens could often not trust their officers to carry out their orders; given the threats to potential witnesses; the use of blackmail (a word first heard of in the borderlands of England and Scotland); and given the collusion of some of the local magnates, lairds and Wardens, it is not surprising that March law "could and did sometimes work surprisingly well, but it was at best a finger in the dyke." It was also Fraser's view that the Anglo-Scottish Border laws "were self-defeating; they were in themselves a recognition of abnormality, and at worst they even encouraged it."

== See also ==
- Anglo-Scottish Wars
- Border Reivers
- March law (Ireland)
- March law (Anglo-Welsh border)
