= Workers Trust and Merchant Bank Ltd v Dojap Investments Ltd =

- Court: Judicial Committee of the Privy Council
- Citations: [1993] UKPC 7, [1993] AC 573, [1993] 2 All ER 370

Case history
- Prior action: Court of Appeal of Jamaica

Keywords
- Contract, remedies

Workers Trust and Merchant Bank Ltd v Dojap Investments Ltd [1993] UKPC 7 is a contract law case of the Judicial Committee of the Privy Council, on appeal from the Court of Appeal of Jamaica. The case concerns the dividing line between a penal requirement for a deposit and liquidated damages.

== Facts ==
A contract for buying a house said time was of the essence. The sellers said the 25% deposit was forfeit after the buyers failed to pay the balance in 14 days as the contract required. The buyers tried to send the balance in a week later with interest. The deposit was a Jamaican $3m.

== Judgment ==
The Privy Council advised that the sellers could not retain the deposit, and must return, subtracting any loss they could prove they suffered. Lord Browne-Wilkinson said it was "not possible for the parties to attach the incidents of a deposit to the payment of a sum of money unless such sum is reasonable as earnest money." A reasonable deposit would be 10 per cent, and if higher the seller "must show special circumstances which justify such a deposit." This was so even though 10 per cent in itself was "without logic", but it was a good benchmark.

== See also ==
- English contract law
