= Office of Fair Trading v Abbey National plc =

OFT v Abbey National plc
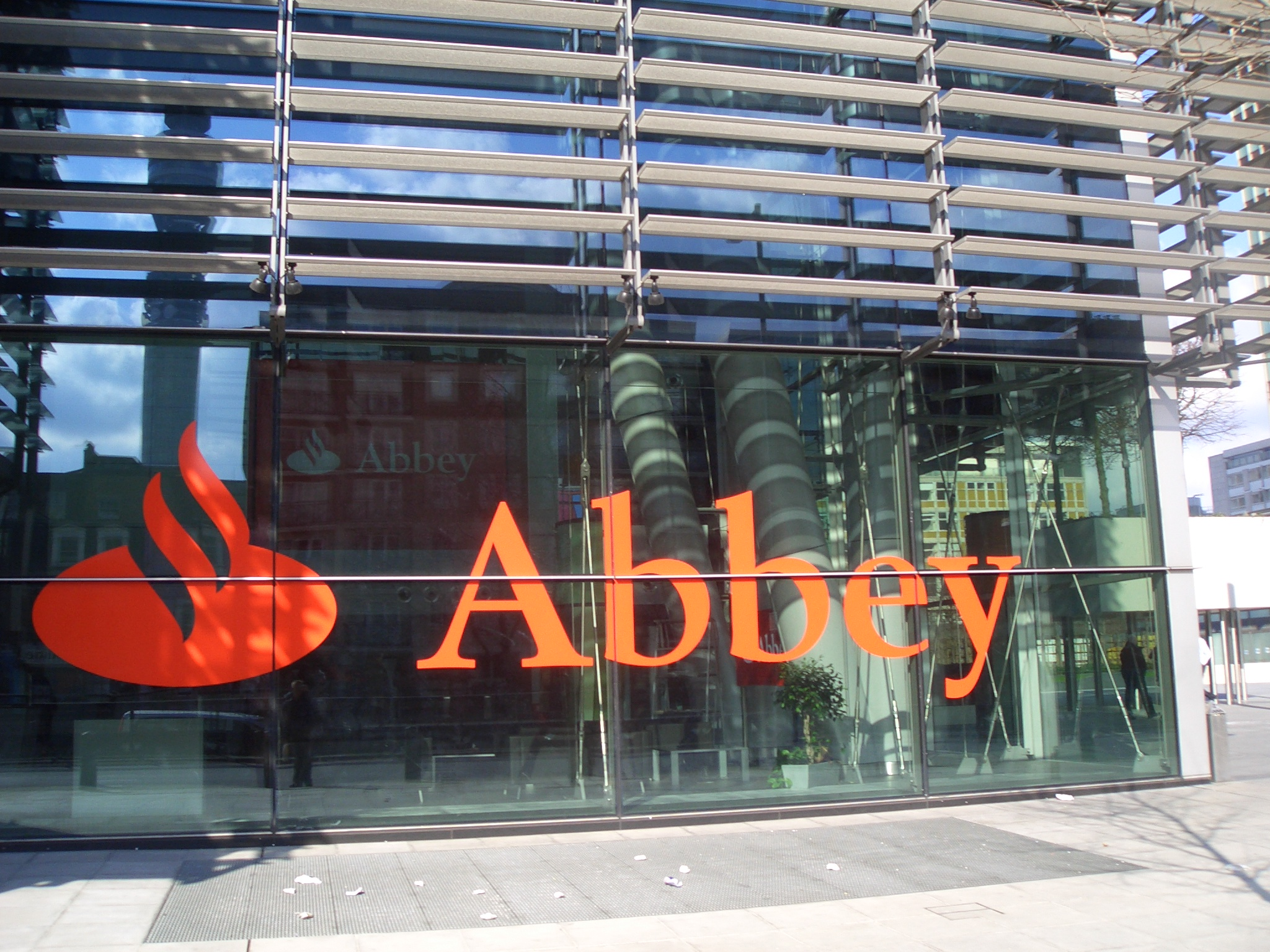
- Court: UK Supreme Court
- Full case name: Office of Fair Trading v Abbey National plc and Others
- Decided: 25 November 2009
- Citation: [2009] UKSC 6

Case history
- Prior actions: [2009] EWCA Civ 116 [2008] EWHC 875 (Comm)

Case opinions
- Lord Phillips of Worth Matravers; Lord Walker of Gestingthorpe; Baroness Hale of Richmond; Lord Mance; Lord Neuberger of Abbotsbury

Keywords
- Unfair terms, penalty clauses, bank overdrafts

Office of Fair Trading v Abbey National plc and Others [2009] UKSC 6 is a judicial decision of the United Kingdom Supreme Court relating to bank charges in the United Kingdom, with reference to the situation where a bank account holder goes into unplanned overdraft.

When a bank customer uses an unplanned overdraft and then makes a payment request (whether by standing order, direct debit or using an ATM or debit card), banks generally make the payment as requested, and then charge fees (which may include "paid item" charges and unauthorised overdraft fees) which accrue on a daily basis whilst the unauthorised overdraft continues. The Office of Fair Trading (OFT), acting on behalf of consumers, challenged these fees under the Unfair Terms in Consumer Contracts Regulations 1999 (UTCCR), which implements European Union Unfair Contract Terms Directive. OFT claimed the sizeable fees charged were not a fair reflection of the banks' costs but were instead a penalty upon the consumer or bank account holder, hence unlawful. If these fees were confirmed to be a penalty for breach of contract then under UK law the amount that could be charged would be limited to reflect the actual (and considerably lower) costs which were incurred by the bank.

The High Court held that although the charges were not penal, they fell within the remit of the legislation and hence their fairness could be assessed by the OFT. The Court of Appeal agreed and held unanimously and emphatically that the charges could be assessed for fairness. But the UK Supreme Court reversed this decision, holding that the charges could not be assessed for fairness by the OFT, or the courts. They held that UTCCR 1999 r 6(2), as the United Kingdom chose to implement the European Directive, precluded any assessment of the "core terms" of a contract, and because overdraft fees related to a bank's remuneration, the fees charged to consumers could not be challenged. Baroness Hale asserted that while the court had no power to do anything, Parliament could have chosen to construe the directive more broadly, and it would be up to the legislature to decide differently. The Supreme Court denied any reference to the European Court of Justice (through art 234 TEC), so bringing to an end the litigation. The regulations could be challenged as failing to implement the directive through a separate case, but since any decision by the ECJ would be prospective only the government, and not the banks, would have to pay any compensation. This may be unlikely to succeed, since the Directive gives discretion to Member States to regulate all terms or non-core terms.

== Facts ==
Abbey National, Barclays Bank, Clydesdale Bank, HBOS, HSBC Bank, Lloyds TSB, Nationwide Building Society and the Royal Bank of Scotland asked for declarations that their standard terms for charging customers were incapable of being penalties at common law. The OFT investigated charges where bank customers requested or instructed a bank to make a payment for which they had no necessary funds and was beyond an overdraft. The OFT argued that the breach of contract was not going into overdraft, but the customer telling his bank to go into overdraft. The bank argued that using a card without funds was a breach and therefore the charge was not penal.

== Judgement ==
=== High Court ===
Andrew Smith J granted declarations for the banks. His ruling applied to "[un]paid item charges, paid item charges, overdraft excess charges, and guaranteed paid item charges"

The banks, engaging nine Queen's Counsels and fifteen other barristers, successfully established that the contractual terms were not penal, because the charge was not consequent on any breach of contract by a customer. The remaining question was then whether the charges fell foul of the Unfair Contract Terms Act 1977 (particularly s 6(2)) or the UTCCR.

Much was made by the banks of the clear, intelligible language used in the clauses in question. The judgement concluded that the language used was clear and intelligible in the contracts of HSBC, Lloyds TSB, Nationwide and RBSG; and similarly in the most part for Abbey National, Barclays, Clydesdale and HBOS although lacking in minor detail. It is unlikely that the relevant consumer protection law will be stifled by the conclusion of clear and intelligible language.

The banks attempted to establish that the statute is inapplicable to the charges in question. The essence of the argument submitted was that the charges are remuneration for the service provided by the bank (supplying a bank account) and so these particular contractual terms are not severable from the contract as a whole. This argument was rejected by the High Court.

The practical impact of this case is that customers can begin or continue claims against their banks and the lower courts will follow Office of Fair Trading v Abbey National plc and Others and assess the fairness of the clauses.

On penalties, Andrew Smith J said the following,

295 Before dealing with other issues about the application of the 1999 Regulations, it is convenient next to consider whether the Relevant Terms and Relevant Charges are penalties so as to be unenforceable at common law against the customer. In order for a provision for payment to be penal, it must provide for payment upon a breach of contract (see Export Credits Guarantee Department v Universal Oil Products Co, [1983] 1 WLR 399) that is not a genuine pre-estimate of loss from the breach but which is extravagant and unconscionable in amount in comparison with the prospective loss (see Jeancharm Ltd v Barnet Football Club Ltd [2003] EWCA Civ 58 at para 27).

296 The Banks seek declarations that their Relevant Terms and their Relevant Charges "are not capable of amounting to" penalties at common law. They do not suggest that I can determine on the evidence before me whether the amounts levied by them are extravagant or unconscionable and no more than a genuine pre-estimate of loss. That would, if necessary, require consideration on another occasion. The Banks do, however, argue that the Relevant Charges are not payable upon a breach of contract on the part of customers.

297 The OFT rightly does not suggest that prima facie a customer is in breach of his contract with his bank if he gives instructions for a payment from his current account for which he does not have funds or a facility. He will not thereby be in breach of contract in the absence of special circumstances or some specific provision in his contract with the bank which prohibits what he does.

298 The OFT, however, identifies some provisions in the Banks' current and historical terms which, it is submitted, might give rise to customers being in breach of contract in these circumstances. For reasons that I have explained, in this judgement I consider provisions in current terms other than those governing basic accounts, specifically provisions in the terms of Abbey, Barclays, Lloyds TSB and Nationwide, and I also consider some historical terms used until recently by Clydesdale and by RBSG. It is necessary to examine separately each of the provisions identified by the OFT as arguably penal in order to determine

(i) whether it is truly of contractual effect (and not, for example, merely exhortatory or advisory);
(ii) if it is of contractual effect, whether it imposes an obligation or prohibition upon the customer (rather than, for example, simply states a condition precedent before an obligation on the Bank arises); and
(iii) if it does impose a contractual obligation or prohibition upon the customer, whether the Relevant Charge is payable upon breach of it.

Leaving aside basic accounts, I consider that the OFT has identified all the arguably penal provisions in the terms now used by the Banks for their personal current accounts and in the historical terms of Clydesdale and RBSG to which I have referred. It has rightly not suggested that there is any penal provision in the terms now used by Clydesdale, HBOS, HSBC, and RBSG.

299 The Banks emphasise that a Relevant Charge cannot be penal unless it is payable upon a breach by the customer, and illustrate this principle by referring to the decision of the Court of Appeal in Jervis v Harris [1996] Ch 195, which concerned a provision in a lease (clause 2(10)) obliging a tenant to carry out repairs and providing that if he did not do so, the landlord might do the repairs and recover from the tenant the costs and expenses of doing so. This provision was held not to be penal, and Millett LJ said this (at p.206E-G):

"… it is well settled that the event on which the sum alleged to be a penalty becomes payable must be a breach of some other contractual obligation owed by the obligor to the obligee. That is not the case here. There is only one relevant obligation on the part of the tenant and that is to repay the landlord his costs in carrying out repairs himself…. the event which triggers the tenant's liability under a clause such as clause 2(10) is the expenditure by the landlord of money in effecting repairs, not the anterior failure of the tenant to repair."

Undoubtedly the law about penalties does not apply if the obligation is to pay for a service or upon an event other than a breach, even if the service is supplied or the event takes place against the background of or accompanied by a contractual breach, and even if the service would not have been provided or the event would not have occurred but for the breach. A customer could not necessarily invoke the law about penalties to challenge charges payable for his bank lending him money simply because his account would not be overdrawn but for his own breach. If an obligation to pay is penal, it must require payment upon the breach itself.

The banks appealed.

=== Court of Appeal ===
After submissions on the 8 October and 5 November 2008, a combined decision of Sir Anthony Clarke, Waller LJ and Lloyd LJ held emphatically that the OFT had the jurisdiction to assess the fairness of the banks' unplanned overdraft fees. It denied leave to appeal to the House of Lords.

=== Supreme Court ===
The banks petitioned the House of Lords (which was replaced by the Supreme Court on 1 October 2009) for permission to appeal on 25 March 2009, granted on 31 March. and the banks entered their appeal petition on 6 April 2009. After a hearing on 23–25 June 2009 by Lord Phillips of Worth Matravers, Lord Walker of Gestingthorpe, Baroness Hale of Richmond, Lord Mance, Lord Neuberger of Abbotsbury, judgement was handed down by the Supreme Court at 9.45am on Wednesday 25 November 2009, with the Supreme Court judges finding unanimously in favour of the banks. They held that the bank charges were a core term of the contracts for bank accounts, relating to the banks' remuneration. Therefore, under the authority by the OFT to assess the fairness of terms under UTCCR 1999 reg. 6(2), the unplanned overdraft were not capable of assessment.

Lord Mance stated the following in his decision:

97. Since the Directive and Regulations are concerned with terms in contracts, it is first of all necessary to identify the relevant contracts. This is a matter about which the judge, Andrew Smith J, and the Court of Appeal took different views, although again it is not suggested that it raises on the facts of this case any particular issue of European law. The banks’ primary case is that the relevant contracts are the contracts for an overall package of banking facilities made by the banks with their customers. Andrew Smith J rejected this analysis as unnatural: payments by way of Relevant Charges could not be said to be paid in exchange for services supplied when an account is in credit; and the description “free-if-in-credit” connoted that there was no price to be paid when an account was in credit (paras. 398-9). Furthermore, if the relevant contract was taken to be the overall package, the Relevant Charges would represent no more than part of the price or remuneration, and an assessment of the fairness of such charges as against the package of services would be “beside the point” and “would not intrude upon the essential bargain” intended to be protected from assessment (para. 400).

98. There is in my opinion a flaw in this reasoning. It is not comparing like with like. Viewing the matter at the level of the banking contracts, the comparison is between, on the one hand, the package of services offered by the banks (some or all of which may or may not be used by any particular customer) and, on the other, the customer’s commitment to pay such charges as may arise from whatever facilities he does use. At this level, the banks’ case is that price or remuneration is or includes the customer’s potential liability for charges, rather than the payments which he or she has actually to make if and when such charges are incurred. In my opinion the Court of Appeal was right in para. 97 of its judgement to identify the relevant contract as being in the first instance the banking contract for an overall package of facilities. That is the contract in which the Relevant Charges appear and were agreed.

99. Further, any challenge to the fairness of a term must be to its fairness in the context of the relevant contract in which it appears. It is “beside the point” if it is not. If, on a proper analysis, the customer’s potential liability for the Relevant Charges is the or part of the “price or remuneration” in exchange for which the overall package of banking services is supplied, and it is challenged on the ground that it makes such price or remuneration disproportionate overall, then regulation 6(2)(b) excludes the challenge. If there is no challenge to the overall proportionality of the overall price or remuneration of the package, then I fail to see how a challenge to the proportionality of the Relevant Charges in relation to the cost of providing particular services in isolation can be admissible or relevant. A term which is proportionate in context cannot become disproportionate viewed out of context.

100. It is true that Relevant Charges are only incurred when a customer, either deliberately or inadvertently, gives an instruction or enters into a transaction, by which as a matter of law and contract he or she requests the bank to provide overdraft facilities. So, each time such a request is made and acted upon (even if only with the result that the request is declined), it is possible to identify a more developed contractual relationship as arising. Under that relationship, the Relevant Charges become payable in respect of the request (although not, the judge thought, in exchange for any services provided in consequence of the request). I do not however consider that this relationship can be the contract to which the Directive and Regulations refer. If the agreement to incur the Relevant Charges is part of an overall package contract, its vulnerability to challenge and, if permissible, any assessment of its fairness under the Directive and Regulations must, as I have said, depend upon an analysis of such agreement as part of the package contract. Otherwise, as Mr Sumption pointed out, a customer could challenge each separate part of a package in isolation, although as a whole the price or remuneration charged was unchallengeable.

[...]

103. ... That power follows from the bank’s ownership of money deposited with or transferred to it. (Further, since the deposit with or transfer to a bank of money is the main or part of the main subject matter of a banking contract, any assessment of the fairness of it or its legal consequences would appear to be excluded under regulation 6(2)(a), rather than (b).) Alternatively, the OFT suggests, without committing itself, that, if there is any price or remuneration under a free-if-in-credit banking contract, it is more easily found in the customer’s agreement to pay overdraft interest.

104. In accordance with general European legal principle, article 4(2) and regulation 6(2) are as exceptions to be construed narrowly. Nevertheless, the concepts of “price or remuneration” must, I think, be capable in principle of covering, under a banking contract, an agreement to make a payment in a particular event. The language of regulation 6(2)(b) is on its face therefore capable of covering a customer’s commitment, under the package contracts put before the House, to pay the Relevant Charges in the specified events. There is no reason why a customer should not be given free services in some circumstances, but, as a quid pro quo, be expected to pay for them in others.

== See also ==
- Unfair Contract Terms Act 1977
- Unfair Terms in Consumer Contracts Regulations 1999
- Bank charge
- Interfoto v Stiletto [1989] QB 433
- Director General of Fair Trading v First National Bank plc [2001] UKHL 52
