= March law (Anglo-Welsh border) =

Law governing the medieval Marches of Wales

March law (or the law of the March) was the law in force in the Welsh Marches during the late Middle Ages. The first official reference to a distinct March law is found in clause 56 of Magna Carta of 1215, which reads: "if a dispute arises ... it shall be settled ... for tenements in England according to the law of England, for tenements in Wales according to the law of Wales, for tenements in the March according to the law of the March." The right of those in the Marches to be tried under March law was reaffirmed in the Treaty of Aberconwy in 1277.

The law of the March was never codified and did not have a definitive form. It was criticized, before the passage of the Laws in Wales Acts 1535 and 1542, for being partially confined to memory alone.

== See also ==
- March law (Anglo-Scottish border)
- March law (Ireland)

== Bibliography ==
- Davies, R. R. (1970). "The Law of the March". Welsh History Review. 5: 1–30.
