= Scottish Marches =

Border area between England and Scotland in the medieval and early modern eras

Coordinates: 55°11′N 2°41′W

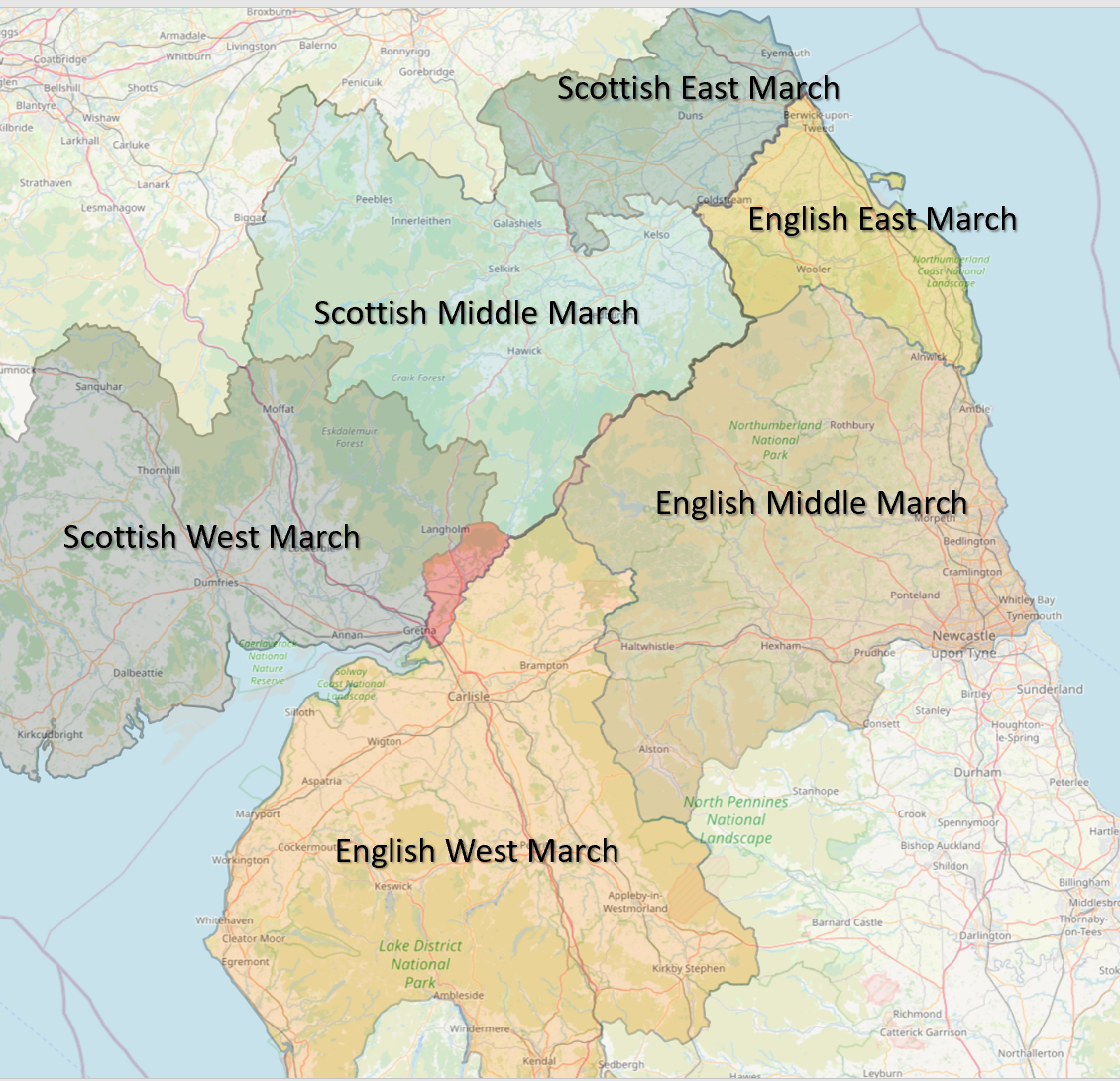
Regions of the Scottish Marches

The Scottish Marches were the Anglo-Scottish border region during the Late Middle Ages and the Early Modern era, characterised by violence and cross-border raids. The Scottish Marches era came to an end during the first decade of the 17th century following the Union of the Crowns of England and Scotland.

== Extent ==
In the strict sense, the Scottish Marches comprised the territories organised under the medieval Anglo-Scottish March systems of East, Middle and West Marches, which were replicated on both sides of the border. On the Scottish side, the marches included the historic counties of Berwickshire, Roxburghshire, Selkirkshire, Peeblesshire, Dumfriesshire and Galloway. On the English side, the Marches compromised the historic counties of Northumberland, Cumberland and Westmorland. More broadly, the region may be extended to include County Durham. Despite lying outside the jurisdiction of the Marches, its high moorland society was organised in much the same way as in Northumberland and Cumberland and shared the same stresses; Weardale could be subject to the same predatory incursions of the Border reivers as the valleys of the Rede and Tyne.

== History ==
=== Origins ===
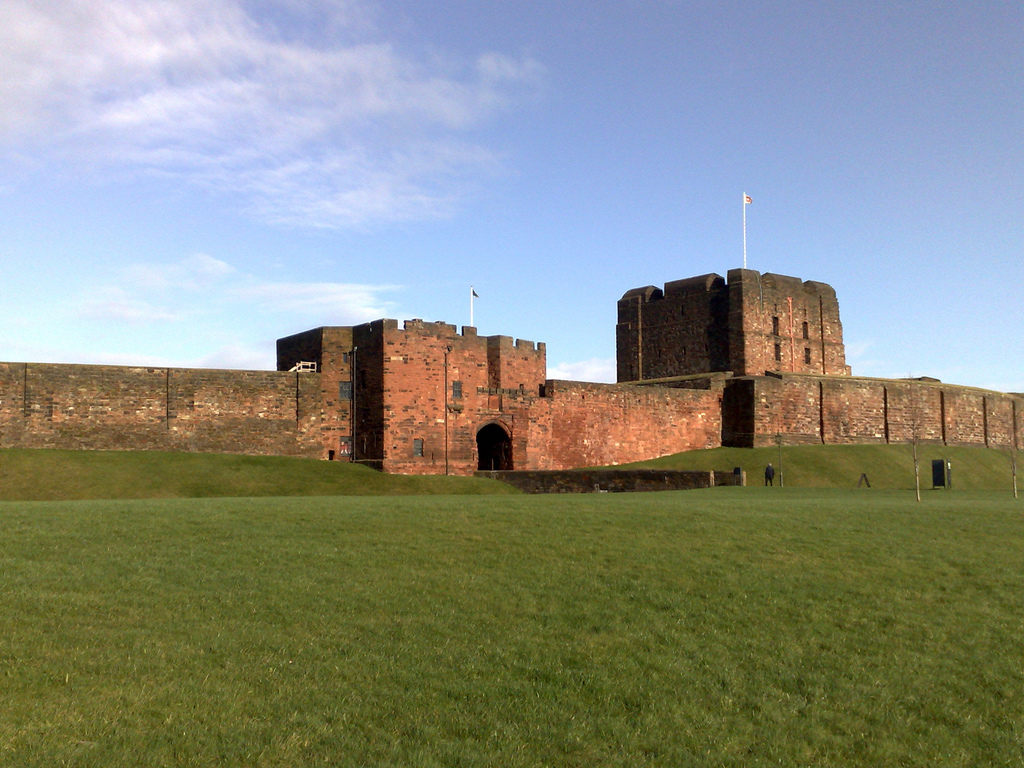
Carlisle Castle, headquarters of the English Western March

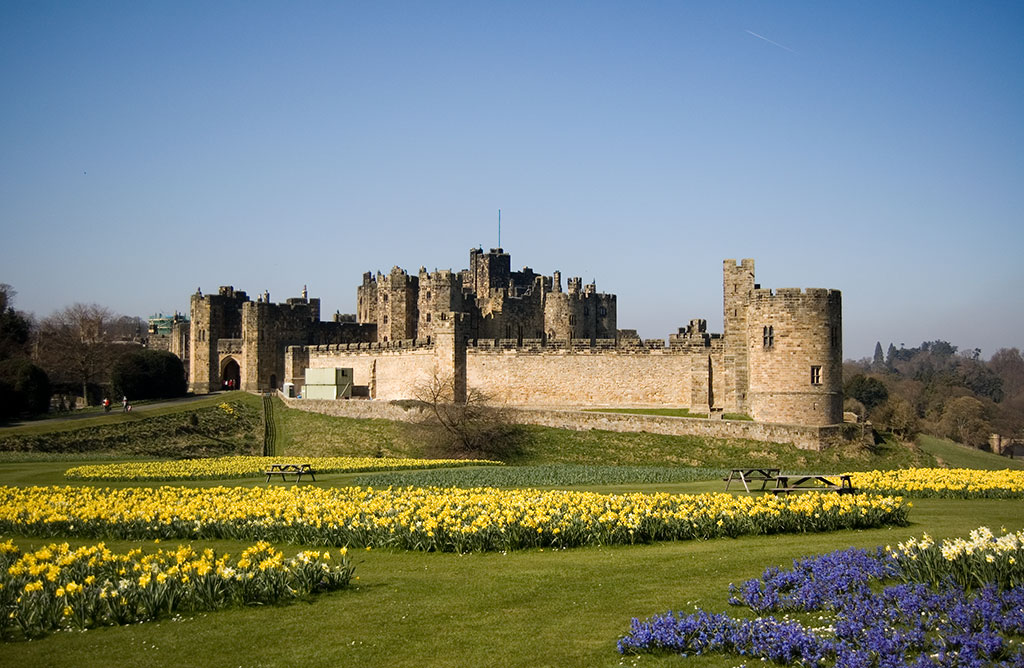
Alnwick Castle, headquarters of the English Middle March

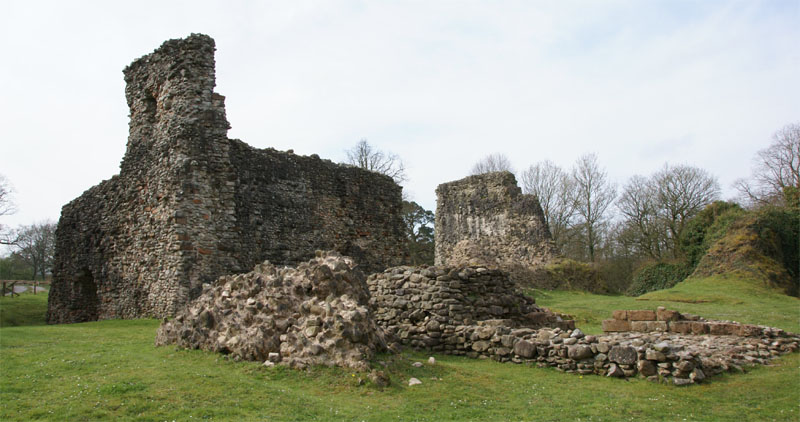
Lochmaben Castle, fortress of the Scottish Western March

The Marches were first conceived in a treaty between Henry III of England and Alexander III of Scotland in 1249 as an attempt to control the Anglo-Scottish border by providing a buffer zone. On each side of the Anglo-Scottish border there was the West March, the Middle March and the East March. These regions nearly mirrored each other but there was some overlap between the Scottish and English regions. In the late 13th century Edward I of England appointed the first Lord Warden of the Marches, who was tasked with overseeing these regions and keeping their monarch's domain secure; when it was in their interests, they would encourage cross-border raiding, or even full-scale war.

Especially in the Tudor period, some inhabitants of the Marches on either side of the border exhibited mixed national allegiances, and parts of the region were home to Riding Surnames or clans. Before the two kingdoms were united in March 1603, under the personal union of Scotland and England under James VI of Scotland (James I of England), the border clans would switch allegiance between the Scottish and English thrones depending on what was most favourable for the members of the clan. For a time, powerful local clans dominated a region on the border between England and Scotland, known as the Debatable Lands, where neither monarch's writ was heeded.

During this era, the Border Reivers were raiders that attacked local residents. There were both English and Scottish clans in these groups, and they would attack regardless of nationality. Local farmers would often need to make payments to the various clans as a form of protection money to ensure they were not attacked. These agreements were called black mal, from an Old Norse word mal meaning 'agreement'. The word blackmail entered the English language in 1530 as a result.

The fluid nature of the border, and the frequent wars between Scotland and England, made the Marches fertile ground for many bandits and reivers who exploited the situation. The wardens of the Marches on either side of the border were entrusted with the difficult task of keeping the peace and punishing wrongdoers; the Scottish and English wardens would meet to co-ordinate their efforts against free-lance reivers at "days of march" (or "days of truce"), when they implemented March law, a kind of customary law agreed upon by the two realms during times of peace.

The reiver period produced one unique architectural feature in the old reiver country—the peel tower, a defensive structure found on many great houses (and indeed on Carlisle Cathedral). It has also produced a great deal of romantic literature, most famously the works of Sir Walter Scott.

Berwick-upon-Tweed, a strategic town on the north bank of the River Tweed (the traditional border in the East March), is slightly closer to Edinburgh than to Newcastle. It was fought over many times: between 1147 and 1482, the town changed hands between the two nations more than 13 times. As late as the reign of Elizabeth I of England, the English considered it worth spending a fortune on the latest style of fortifications (trace italienne) to secure the town against Scottish attack.

=== 17th century ===
The Scottish Marches era came to an end during the first decade of the 17th century with the creation of the Middle Shires, promulgated after the personal union of Scotland and England under James VI of Scotland (James I of England).

== See also ==
- March law
- March Pursuivant
