= Welsh Marches =

Border region between Wales and England

Coordinates: 52°N 3°W

The Welsh Marches (Welsh: Y Mers) is an imprecisely defined area along the border between England and Wales in the United Kingdom. The precise meaning of the term has varied at different periods.

The English term Welsh March (Medieval Latin: Marchia Walliae) was originally used in the Middle Ages to denote the marches between England and the Principality of Wales, in which Marcher lords had specific rights, exercised to some extent independently of the king of England. In modern usage, "the Marches" is often used to describe those English counties which lie along the border with Wales, particularly Shropshire and Herefordshire, and sometimes adjoining areas of Wales. However, at one time the Marches included all of the historic counties of Cheshire, Shropshire, Herefordshire, Worcestershire and Gloucestershire.

== Etymology ==
The term March is from the 13th-century Middle English marche ('border region, frontier'). The term was borrowed from Old French marche ('limit, boundary'), itself borrowed from a Frankish term derived from Proto-Germanic *markō ('border, area'). The term is a doublet of English mark, and is cognate with German Mark ('boundary'). Cognates are found in the English toponyms Mercia and Mersey, and in continental place-names containing mark, such as Denmark.

== Origins: Mercia and the Welsh ==
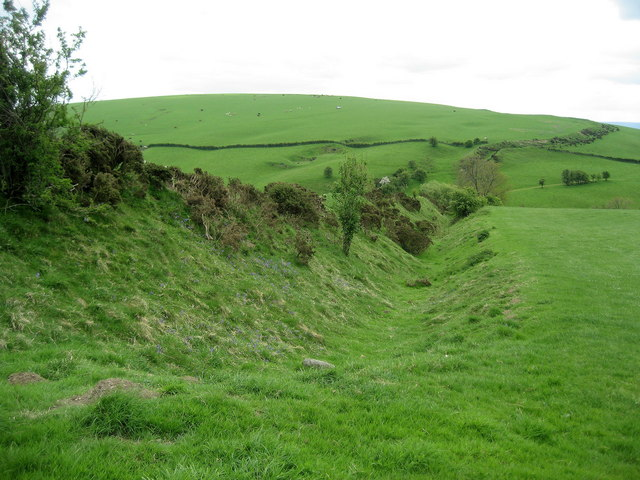
Offa's Dyke near Clun in Shropshire

After the decline and fall of the Roman Empire which occupied southern Britain until about AD 410, the area which is now Wales comprised a number of separate Romano-British kingdoms, including Powys in the east. Over the next few centuries, the Angles, Saxons and others gradually conquered and settled in eastern and southern Britain. The kingdom of Mercia, under Penda, became established around Lichfield, and initially established strong alliances with the Welsh kings.

However, his successors sought to expand Mercia further westwards into what is now Cheshire, Shropshire and Herefordshire. As the power of Mercia grew, a string of garrisoned market towns such as Shrewsbury and Hereford defined the borderlands as much as Offa's Dyke, a stronger and longer boundary earthwork erected by order of Offa of Mercia between AD 757 and 796. The Dyke still exists, and can best be seen at Knighton, close to the modern border between England and Wales. Campaigns and raids from Powys led, possibly around about AD 820, to the building of Wat's Dyke, a boundary earthwork extending from the Severn valley near Oswestry to the Dee estuary.

In the centuries which followed, Offa's Dyke largely remained the frontier between the Welsh and English. Æthelstan, often seen as the first king of a united England, summoned the British kings to a meeting at Hereford in AD 926, and according to William of Malmesbury laid down the boundary between Wales and England, particularly the disputed southern stretch where he specified that the River Wye should form the boundary.

By the mid-eleventh century, Wales was united under Gruffydd ap Llywelyn of Gwynedd.

== The Marches in the Middle Ages ==
Immediately after the Norman Conquest, King William of England installed three of his most trusted confidants, Hugh d'Avranches, Roger de Montgomerie, and William FitzOsbern, as Earls of Chester, Shrewsbury and Hereford respectively, with responsibilities for containing and subduing the Welsh. The process took a century and was never permanently effective.

The term "March of Wales" was first used in the Domesday Book of 1086. Over the next four centuries, Norman lords established mostly small marcher lordships between the Dee and Severn, and further west. Military adventurers went to Wales from Normandy and elsewhere and after raiding an area of Wales, then fortified it and granted land to some of their supporters.

One example was Bernard de Neufmarché, responsible for conquering and pacifying the Welsh kingdom of Brycheiniog. The precise dates and means of formation of the lordships varied, as did their size.

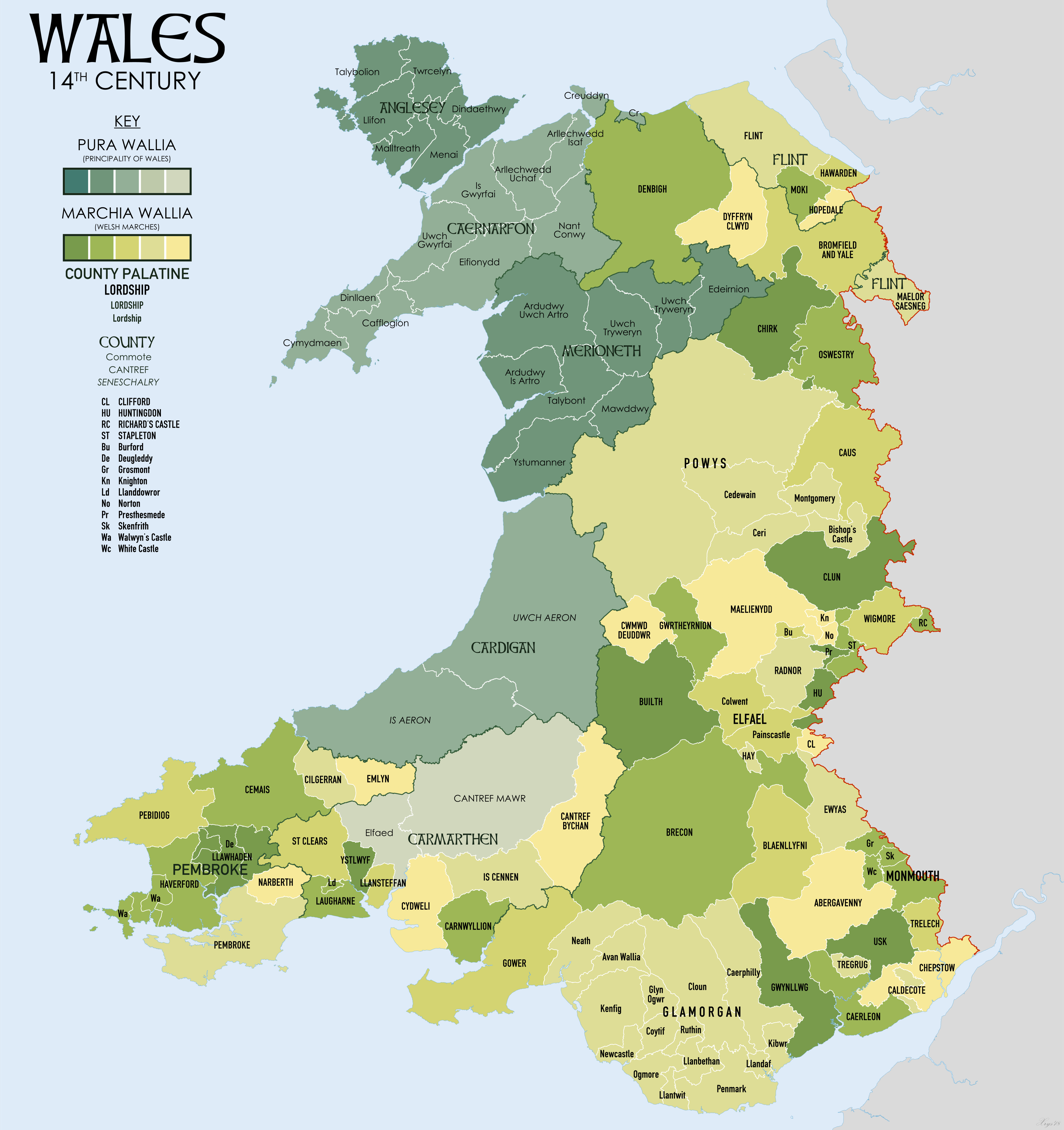
Wales in the 14th Century showing Marcher Lordships

The March, or Marchia Wallie, was to a greater or lesser extent independent of both the English monarchy and the Principality of Wales or Pura Wallia, which remained based in Gwynedd in the north west of the country. By about AD 1100 the March covered the areas which would later become Monmouthshire and much of Flintshire, Montgomeryshire, Radnorshire, Brecknockshire, Glamorgan, Carmarthenshire and Pembrokeshire. Ultimately, this amounted to about two-thirds of Wales.

During the period, the Marches were a frontier society in every sense, and a stamp was set on the region that lasted into the time of the Industrial Revolution. Hundreds of small castles were built in the border area in the 12th and 13th centuries, predominantly by Norman lords as assertions of power as well as defences against Welsh raiders and rebels. The area still contains Britain's densest concentration of motte-and-bailey castles. The Marcher lords encouraged immigration from all the Norman-Angevin realms, and encouraged trade from "fair haven" ports like Cardiff. Peasants went to Wales in large numbers: Henry I encouraged Bretons, Flemings, Normans, and English settlers to move into the south of Wales. Many new towns were established, some such as Chepstow, Monmouth, Ludlow and Newtown becoming successful trading centres, and these tended also to be a focus of English settlement. At the same time, the Welsh continued to attack English soil and supported rebellions against the Normans.

The Norman lords each had similar rights to the Welsh princes. Each owed personal allegiance, as subjects, to the English king whom they were bound to support in times of war, but their lands were exempt from royal taxation and they possessed rights which elsewhere were reserved to the crown, such as the rights to create forests, markets and boroughs.

The lordships were geographically compact and jurisdictionally separate one from another, and their privileges differentiated them from English lordships. Marcher lords ruled their lands by their own law—sicut regale ("like unto a king") as Gilbert de Clare, 7th Earl of Gloucester stated — whereas in England fief-holders were directly accountable to the king. The crown's powers in the Marches were normally limited to those periods when the king held a lordship in its own hands, such as when it was forfeited for treason or on the death of the lord without a legitimate heir whereupon the title reverted to the Crown in escheat. At the top of a culturally diverse, intensely feudalised and local society, the Marcher barons combined the authority of feudal lord and vassal of the King among their Normans, and of supplanting the traditional tywysog among their conquered Welsh. However, Welsh law was sometimes used in the Marches in preference to English law, and there were disputes as to which code should be used to decide a particular case. From this developed the distinctive March law.

The Statute of Rhuddlan in 1284 followed the conquest of the Principality by Edward I of England. It assumed the lands held by the Princes of Gwynedd under the title "Prince of Wales" as legally part of the lands of the Crown, and established shire counties on the English model over those areas. The Marcher Lords were progressively tied to the English kings by the grants of lands and lordships in England, where control was stricter, and where many marcher lords spent most of their time, and through the English kings' dynastic alliances with the great magnates. The Council of Wales and the Marches, administered from Ludlow Castle, was initially established in 1472 by Edward IV of England to govern the lands held under the Principality of Wales which had become directly administered by the English crown following the Edwardian conquest of Wales in the 13th century.

== End of Marcher powers ==
Marches in Wales Act 1534
- Act of Parliament
- Parliament of England
- Long title: An Act that Murthers and Felonies done or committed within any Lordship Marcher in Wales, shall be inquired of at the Sessions holden within the Shire Grounds next adjoining; with many goods Orders for Ministration of Justice there to be had.
- Citation: 26 Hen. 8. c. 6
- Territorial extent: England and Wales

Dates
- Royal assent: 18 December 1534
- Commencement: 3 November 1534 (Note: Start of session.)
- Repealed: 21 July 1856
Other legislation
Repealed by	Repeal of Obsolete Statutes Act 1856
Relates to	Laws in Wales Act 1535; Laws in Wales Act 1542

Status: Repealed

Text of statute as originally enacted

By the 16th century, many marcher lordships had passed into the hands of the crown, as the result of the accessions of Henry IV, who was previously Duke of Lancaster, and Edward IV, the heir of the Earls of March; of the attainder of other lords during the Wars of the Roses; and of other events. The crown was also directly responsible for the government of the Principality of Wales, which had its own institutions and was, like England, divided into counties. The jurisdiction of the remaining marcher lords was therefore seen as an anomaly.

Under the Laws in Wales Acts 1535–1542 introduced under Henry VIII, the jurisdiction of the marcher lords was abolished in 1536. The acts had the effect of annexing Wales with England and creating a single state and legal jurisdiction, commonly referred to as England and Wales. The powers of the marcher lordships were abolished, and their areas were organised into the new Welsh counties of Denbighshire, Montgomeryshire, Radnorshire, Brecknockshire, Monmouthshire, and Carmarthenshire. The counties of Pembrokeshire and Glamorgan were created by adding other districts to existing lordships. In place of assize courts of England, there were Courts of Great Sessions. These administered English law, in contrast with the marcher lordships, which had administered Welsh law for their Welsh subjects. Some lordships were added to adjoining English counties: Ludlow, Clun, Caus and part of Montgomery were incorporated into Shropshire; Wigmore, Huntington, Clifford and most of Ewyas were included in Herefordshire; and that part of Chepstow east of the River Wye was included in Gloucestershire.

The Council of Wales, based at Ludlow Castle, was reconstituted as the Council of Wales and the Marches, with statutory responsibilities for the whole of Wales together with, initially, Cheshire, Shropshire, Herefordshire, Worcestershire and Gloucestershire. The City of Bristol was exempted in 1562, and Cheshire in 1569.

The council was eventually abolished in 1689.

=== List of Marcher lordships and successor shires ===
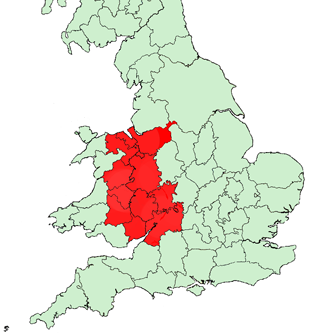

List of Marcher lordships and successor shires:

- Flintshire

Flint
Hawarden
Hopedale
Maelor Saesneg
Mold

- Denbighshire

Bromfield and Yale
Chirkland
Denbigh
Ruthin (Dyffryn Clwyd)

- Montgomeryshire

Caus (part)
Cedewain
Ceri
Montgomery (part)
Powys

- Radnorshire

Cwmwd Deuddor
Elfael
Glasbury
Gwrtheyrnion
Maelienydd
Radnor

- Brecknockshire

Blaenllyfni
Brecon
Builth
Hay

- Monmouthshire

Abergavenny
Caerleon
Chepstow (part)
Ewyas Lacy (part)
Gwynllwg (Wentloog)
Monmouth
Usk

- Glamorgan

Lordship of Glamorgan
Lordship of Gower

- Carmarthenshire

Cantref Bychan
Kidwelly
Emlyn
Llansteffan
Laugharne
St Clears

- Pembrokeshire

Cemais
Cilgerran
Haverford
Llawhaden
Narberth
Pebidiog
Pembroke

- Transferred to English shires

Bishop's Castle (Shropshire)
Caus (part) (Shropshire)
Chepstow (part) (Gloucestershire)
Clifford (Herefordshire)
Clun (Shropshire)
Ewyas Lacy (part) (Herefordshire)
Kington (Herefordshire)
Knighton (partly in Shropshire)
Huntington (Herefordshire)
Montgomery (part) (Shropshire)
Oswestry (Shropshire)
Whittington (Shropshire)
Wigmore (Herefordshire)

== Marches today ==
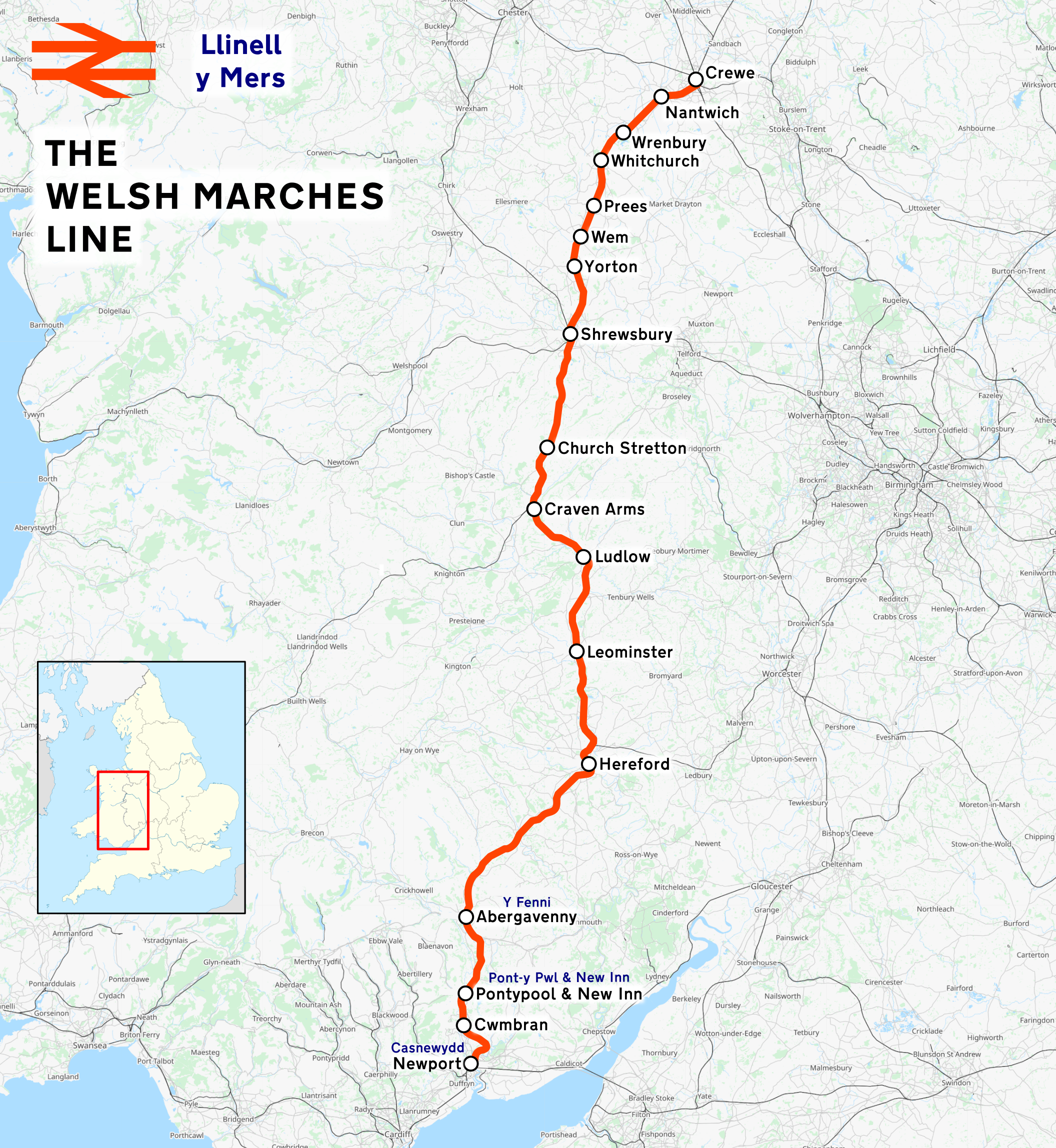
Welsh Marches Line

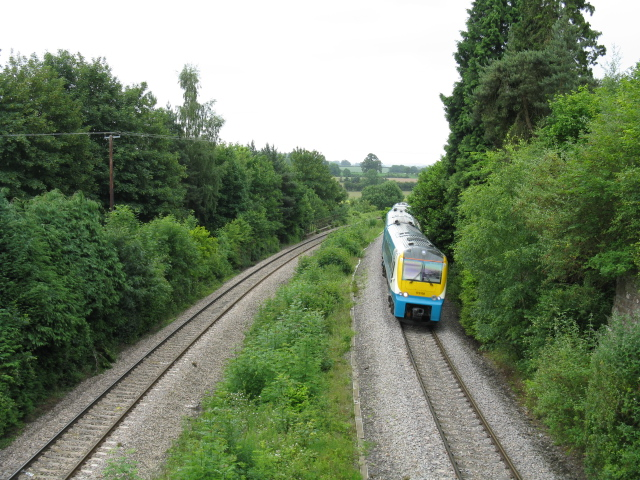
A Class 175 'Coradia' running through currently closed Dinmore railway station, Herefordshire on the Welsh Marches Line on an Arriva Trains Wales service.

There is no modern legal or official definition of the extent of the Welsh Marches. However, the term the Welsh Marches (or sometimes just the Marches) is commonly used to describe those English counties which lie along the border with Wales, particularly Shropshire and Herefordshire. The term is also sometimes applied to parts of Powys, Monmouthshire and Wrexham.

The Welsh Marches Line is a railway line from Newport in the south of Wales to Shrewsbury, via Abergavenny, Hereford, and Craven Arms.

The Marches Way is a long distance footpath which connects Chester in the north of England, via Whitchurch, Shrewsbury, Leominster and Abergavenny to the Welsh capital, Cardiff.

The Marches School is a secondary school in Oswestry, Shropshire. The school has several meeting rooms named in Welsh, and has students and staff from both sides of the border.

== See also ==
- Marches – for other examples, including Scottish Marches between England and Scotland.
- Council of the Marches
- Earl of March – some of the dynastic families controlling the Welsh Marches
- Welsh Lost Lands
- England–Wales border
- East Wales
- A49 – main road that runs north–south through the Marches
- Honour of Richmond
- History of Gwynedd during the High Middle Ages
- Category:Towns of the Welsh Marches
- Category:Counties of the Welsh Marches
