= March law (Ireland) =

March law was a set of laws and customs obtaining in the border areas of the Lordship of Ireland during the Middle Ages. These regions were ruled by Anglo-Irish lords between The Pale, which was the portion of Ireland ruled directly by the English crown, and Gaelic Ireland, which was still under the rule of native kings. It came into being in the late 13th century, when King Edward I of England drained resources from Ireland to fund his conquest of Wales and his wars in Scotland. Since the two areas were often intermingled in the border regions, as in the Wicklow Mountains, the applicability and content of march law varied widely.

Typically, march law was based on English law amended by the addition of Irish law out of practical necessity. The Old English were permitted, under march law, to negotiate with Gaelic cattle rustlers, since the English authorities in Ireland were too weak to pursue such felons. Likewise, felonies in the marches were often punishable by a fine where, under English law, they were punishable by death. In the case of certain crimes, the criminal could be imprisoned by his family.

== See also ==
- March law (Anglo-Scottish border)
- March law (Anglo-Welsh border)
