= Director General of Fair Trading v First National Bank plc =

DGFT v First National Bank plc
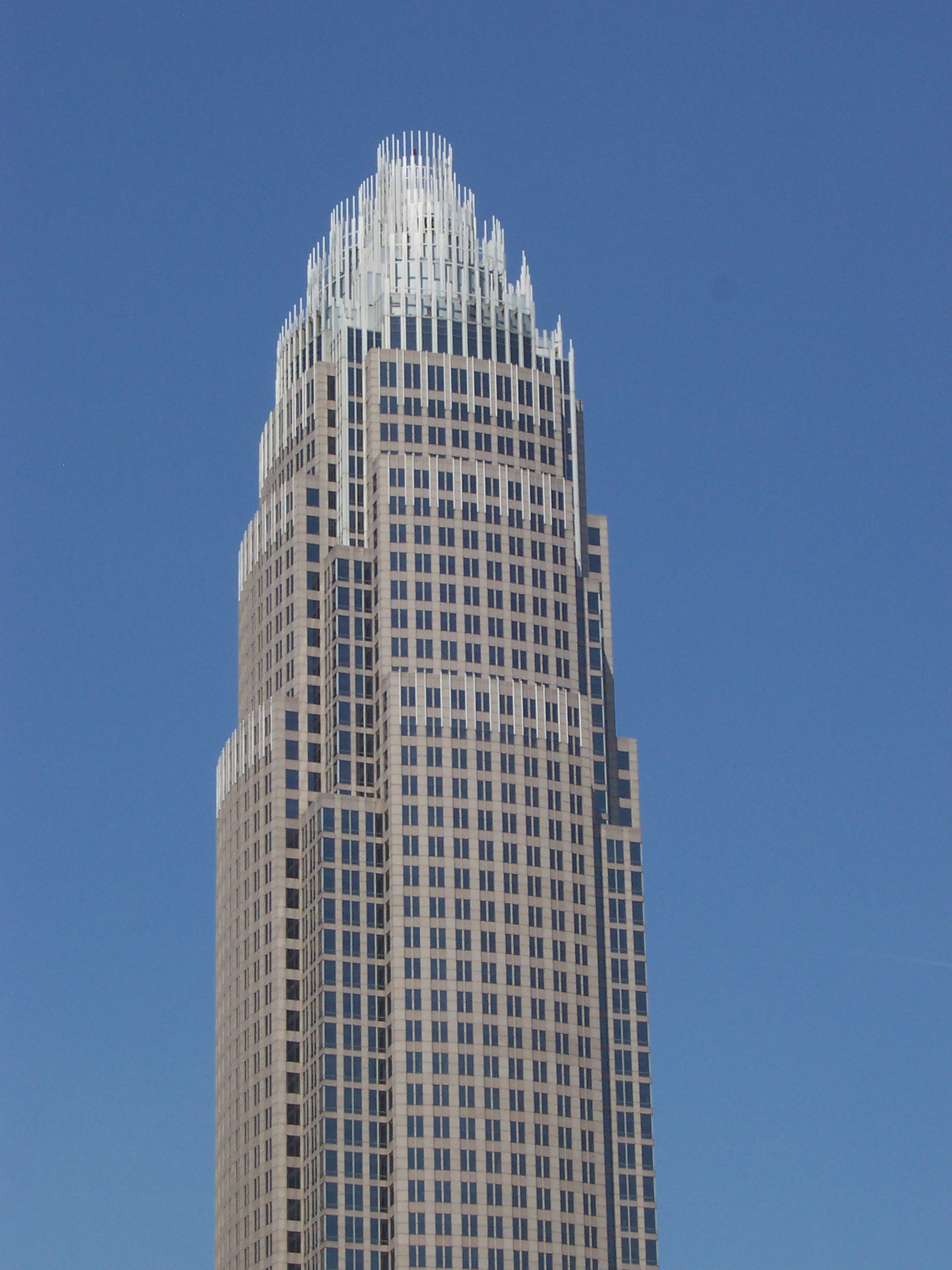
- Court: House of Lords
- Full case name: DIRECTOR GENERAL OF FAIR TRADING Appellant - and - FIRST NATIONAL BANK PLC Respondent
- Citations: [2001] UKHL 52, [2002] 1 AC 481, [2002] 1 All ER 97, [2002] 1 Lloyd's Rep 489, [2001] 3 WLR 129
- Transcript: Full text of judgment

Case history
- Prior action: [2000] EWCA Civ 27

Court membership
- Judges sitting: Lord Bingham of Cornhill, Lord Steyn, Lord Hope of Craighead, Lord Millett, Lord Rodger of Earlsferry

Case opinions
- Lord Bingham, Lord Steyn, Lord Hope, Lord Millett and Lord Rodger

Keywords
- Unfair terms, bank overdrafts

Director General of Fair Trading v First National Bank plc [2001] UKHL 52 is the leading case on the Unfair Terms in Consumer Contracts Regulations 1999. It was an action to test the fairness of clauses in loan agreements which secured a bank's commercial interest rates after a debtor that had defaulted and they had been to court to determine their repayment scheme. The House of Lords held that the clause did not fall within the ambit of reg 6(2) and that it was valid in accordance with the fairness test (reg 5(1)). The case was brought by the Director General of Fair Trading (now the Competition and Markets Authority) on behalf of consumers.

== Facts ==
Condition 8 of the bank's standard loan contract allowed the bank to get its standard interest rate after a judgment on repayment when a customer defaulted. Usually lower statutory interest rates apply under the County Court (Interest on Judgment Debts) Order 1991, but this it excluded judgment debts on consumer credit agreements under the Consumer Credit Act 1974. So the bank wanted condition 8 to get the money it would have in interest even after someone had been unable to pay. Under r 8 of the 1994 Reg's (now r 12) the DG sought an injunction to stop the bank using the term, because it was unfair. Lord Goodhart submitted that the term merely concerned the adequacy of the bank's remuneration, therefore fell under r 3(2) (now r 6(2)). The DG submitted it was a core term and unfair because complaints were made and the 1991 Order had excluded interest.

== Judgment ==
Lord Bingham, held that it was not a core term (i.e. the adequacy of the bank's remuneration) but ‘an ancillary provision’. [12] He said the concept of good faith under r 5(1) had an old (if hidden) English tradition, it was championed by Lord Mansfield and ‘looks to good standards of commercial morality and practice’ It is fair and open dealing, preventing unfair surprise and the absence of real choice. [17] Despite that the clause was fair.

‘There is nothing unbalanced or detrimental to the consumer in that obligation [to repay with interest]; the absence of such a term would unbalance the contract to the detriment of the lender.’

The 1991 Order and the 1974 Act's interaction, whereby interest had been excluded, did not make the term an unfair way of circumventing legislation, because the Act had not prohibited post-judgment interest being payable.

Lord Steyn said,

‘The system of pre-emptive challenges is a more effective way of preventing the continuing use of unfair terms and changing contracting practice than ex casu actions: see Susan Bright, ‘Winning the battle against unfair contract terms’ (2000) 20 LS 331, 333-8.’

He added that he was initially persuaded by the idea that because the legislation had excluded interest, the court could not, but had then decided that because the legislation did not exclude expressly or by necessary implication that interest can accrue, the contract term was fair.

Lords Hope, Millett and Rodger concurred.

== Significance ==
Andrew Burrows writes that because good faith was said to mean ‘fair and open dealing’ and ‘significant imbalance’ meant ‘substantive unfairness’, both procedural and substantive unfairness is encompassed within the meaning of regulation 5(1). He also asks whether the court should have deferred to the Director General's view of what was unfair, recognising respective institutional competence.

== See also ==
- OFT v Abbey [2009] UKSC 90
- Principles of European Contract Law Art.1:201 say ‘each party must act in accordance with good faith and fair dealing’.
