= Unfair Terms in Consumer Contracts Regulations 1999 =

Superseded UK statutory instrument

- Statutory Instrument
- Parliament of the United Kingdom
- Citation: SI 1999/2083

Dates
- Made: 22 July 1999
- Laid before Parliament: 22 July 1999
- Commencement: 1 October 1999
- Revoked: 1 October 2015
Other legislation
Made under	European Communities Act 1972
Transposes	Directive 93/13/EEC
Revoked by	Consumer Rights Act 2015

Status: Revoked

Text of statute as originally enacted

The Unfair Terms in Consumer Contracts Regulations 1999 (SI 1999/2083) was a UK statutory instrument, which implemented the EU (then EEC) Unfair Consumer Contract Terms Directive into domestic law. (Note: Implemented under the European Communities Act 1972. See also (1993) L95 OJ 29.) It replaced an earlier version of similar regulations, (Note: Unfair Terms in Consumer Contracts Regulations 1994) and overlaps considerably with the Unfair Contract Terms Act 1977.

It was superseded by the Consumer Rights Act 2015, which regulates unfair terms in consumer contracts in English contract law.

== Overview ==
The scope of the directive is rather limited, seeking merely to harmonise rather basic consumer rights across the EU. In the UK, these 1999 regulations work to render ineffective terms that benefit seller or suppliers against the interests of consumers. They also have provisions specifically covering standard form contracts.

The regulations overlap somewhat with the Unfair Contract Terms Act 1977 which deals specifically with exemption clauses. The Directive set out requirements that in many ways are narrower than rules already in place in English law. It does, however, extend the scope of terms which can be rendered ineffective; especially when dealing with unfair terms that do not constitute exemption clauses.

There was some criticism in legal circles that the UK government had not bothered to repeal and reenact the 1977 act to embrace the directive. It has been said the regulations "sit atop the act like an ill-fitting wig". The 1994 regulations were declared an insufficient implementation of the directive, and had to be replaced by the 1999 regulations; but once again, the opportunity to consolidate the law into an updated Unfair Contracts Terms Act was missed.

== Definition of "unfair" ==
Regulation 5(1) (Note: "A contractual term which has not been individually negotiated shall be regarded as unfair if, contrary to the requirement of good faith, it causes a significant imbalance in the parties' rights and obligations arising under the contract, to the detriment of the consumer") defines the principle of unfair:

- If a contractual term has not been individually negotiated (Note: Regulation 5(2)) and
- the term causes significant imbalance in the parties' rights and obligations, then
- the term is contrary to the requirement of good faith.

"Has not been individually negotiated" encompasses terms of which the consumer has not had the opportunity to mould. Terms that have been individually negotiated are outside this regulation, while other contract terms may be within the regulation. (Note: Regulation 8(2))

"Causes significant imbalance". For a term to be deemed unfair, this requires the term to be to the detriment of the consumer and benefit the seller or supplier to an excessive degree.

"Contrary to good faith". In the complex case of Director General of Fair Trading v First National Bank, the bank's seemingly unfair interest term was found to be in good faith as the term guarded the bank from a possible situation of receiving no interest defeating their business objective.

Schedule 2 sets out an indicative, non-exhaustive list of terms that would be unfair.

== Effect of the "unfair" term ==
Regulation 8 provides that an unfair term "shall not be binding upon the consumer".

== The contra proferentem rule ==
The contra proferentem rule is that where there is any ambiguity in regards to a clause it is to be interpreted against the party which insisted on including it. Regulation 7 states this very clearly:

(1) A seller or supplier shall ensure that any written term of a contract is expressed in plain, intelligible language.

(2) If there is doubt about the meaning of a written term, the interpretation which is most favourable to the consumer shall prevail but this rule shall not apply in proceedings brought under regulation 12.

== See also ==
- Unfair Contract Terms Act 1977
- European Directives
- Statutory Instruments
- Office of Fair Trading v Abbey National and Others (2008)
- Director General of Fair Trading v First National Bank plc
