= Transnational Information and Consultation of Employees Regulations 1999 =

United Kingdom statutory instrument

Transnational Information and Consultation of Employees Regulations 1999 (Note: Section 1(1).)
- Statutory Instrument
- Parliament of the United Kingdom
- Citation: SI 1999/3323
- Territorial extent: United Kingdom (Note: Section 1(2).)

Dates
- Made: 12 December 1999
- Laid before Parliament: 14 December 1999
- Commencement: 15 January 2000

Other legislation
- Amends: Employment Tribunals Act 1996
- Made under: European Communities Act 1972
- Transposes: European Works Council Directive

Status: Amended

Text of statute as originally enacted

Revised text of statute as amended

Text of the Transnational Information and Consultation of Employees Regulations 1999 as in force today (including any amendments) within the United Kingdom, from legislation.gov.uk.

The Transnational Information and Consultation of Employees Regulations 1999 (SI 1999/3323) (TICER) is a UK labour law that requires employers to inform and consult employees on significant changes to businesses in a standing procedure. This is called a transnational work council/work place forum, and is available if the employer operates in two or more European Union member states. TICER 1999 implement the European Works Council Directive, and operates primarily where US multinational corporations employ people in Europe.

== See also ==
- European labour law
- UK labour law
