= List of statutory instruments of the United Kingdom, 1999 =

For lists of statutory instruments of the United Kingdom, 1999, see:

- List of statutory instruments of the United Kingdom, 1999 (1–1700)
- List of statutory instruments of the United Kingdom, 1999 (1701–3500)
