= List of statutory instruments of the United Kingdom, 1999 (1701–3500) =

This is an incomplete list of statutory instruments of the United Kingdom in 1999 (1701–3500).

== 1701–1800 ==
- The Merchant Shipping (Minimum Standards of Safety Communications) (Amendment) Regulations 1999 (S.I. 1999 No. 1704)
- The Magistrates' Courts Committees (Hereford and Worcester and Shropshire) Amalgamation Order 1999 (S.I. 1999 No. 1705)
- The A205 Trunk Road (Lewisham) Red Route (Prescribed Route) Traffic Order 1999 (S.I. 1999 No. 1706)
- The A205 Trunk Road (Lewisham) Red Route (Bus Lanes) Experimental Traffic Order 1998 Variation Order 1999 (S.I. 1999 No. 1707)
- The Tollesbury and Mersea (Blackwater) Fishery Order 1999 (S.I. 1999 No. 1708)
- The Northern Ireland (Emergency and Prevention of Terrorism Provisions) (Continuance) Order 1999 (S.I. 1999 No. 1709)
- The Traffic Signs General (Amendment) Directions 1999 (S.I. 1999 No. 1723)
- The A23 Trunk Road (Lambeth) Red Route Traffic Order 1999 (S.I. 1999 No. 1724)
- The A35 Trunk Road (Chideock Morcombelake Bypass) Order 1996 (Revocation Order) 1999 (S.I. 1999 No. 1725)
- The General Teaching Council for England (Constitution) Regulations 1999 (S.I. 1999 No. 1726)
- The Local Education Authority (Payment of School Expenses) Regulations 1999 (S.I. 1999 No. 1727)
- The Agreed Syllabus for Religious Education (Prescribed Period) Order 1999 (S.I. 1999 No. 1728)
- The Army, Air Force and Naval Discipline Acts (Continuation) Order 1999 (S.I. 1999 No. 1734)
- The International Headquarters and Defence Organisations (Designation and Privileges) (Amendment) Order 1999 (S.I. 1999 No. 1735)
- The Visiting Forces and International Headquarters (Application of Law) Order 1999 (S.I. 1999 No. 1736)
- The Carriage by Air Acts (Application of Provisions) (Fifth Amendment) Order 1999 (S.I. 1999 No. 1737)
- The European Communities (Definition of Treaties) (Economic Partnership, Political Coordination and Cooperation Agreement between the European Community and its Member States and the United Mexican States) Order 1999 (S.I. 1999 No. 1738)
- The European Communities (Definition of Treaties) (Euro-Mediterranean Agreement establishing an Association between the European Communities and their Member States and the Hashemite Kingdom of Jordan) Order 1999 (S.I. 1999 No. 1739)
- The European Communities (Definition of Treaties) (Framework Agreement for Trade and Cooperation between the European Community and its Member States and the Republic of Korea) Order 1999 (S.I. 1999 No. 1740)
- The Fishery Limits Order 1999 (S.I. 1999 No. 1741)
- The Appropriation (No. 2) (Northern Ireland) Order 1999 (S.I. 1999 No. 1742 (N.I. 7)])
- The Geneva Conventions Act (Isle of Man) Order 1999 (S.I. 1999 No. 1743)
- The Geneva Conventions Act (Jersey) Order 1999 (S.I. 1999 No. 1744)
- The Scottish Parliament (Assistance for Registered Political Parties) Order 1999 (S.I. 1999 No. 1745)
- The Scotland Act 1998 (Border Rivers) Order 1999 (S.I. 1999 No. 1746)
- The Scotland Act 1998 (Cross-Border Public Authorities) (Adaptation of Functions etc.) Order 1999 (S.I. 1999 No. 1747)
- The Scotland Act 1998 (Functions Exercisable in or as Regards Scotland) Order 1999 (S.I. 1999 No. 1748)
- The Scotland Act 1998 (Modifications of Schedules 4 and 5) Order 1999 (S.I. 1999 No. 1749)
- The Scotland Act 1998 (Transfer of Functions to the Scottish Ministers etc.) Order 1999 (S.I. 1999 No. 1750)
- The Copyright (Application to Other Countries) Order 1999 (S.I. 1999 No. 1751)
- The Performances (Reciprocal Protection) (Convention Countries) Order 1999 (S.I. 1999 No. 1752)
- The Northern Ireland Act 1998 (Commencement No. 2) Order 1999 (S.I. 1999 No. 1753 (C. 48)])
- The Local Authorities (Goods and Services) (Public Bodies) (No. 2) Order 1999 (S.I. 1999 No. 1754)
- The Scotland Act 1998 (Modification of Functions) Order 1999 (S.I. 1999 No. 1756)
- The Protection from Eviction (Excluded Licences) (The Shaftesbury Society) Order 1999 (S.I. 1999 No. 1758)
- The Food (Animals and Animal Products from Belgium) (Emergency Control) (Amendment) Order 1999 (S.I. 1999 No. 1763)
- The Animal Feedingstuffs from Belgium (Control) (Amendment) Regulations 1999 (S.I. 1999 No. 1764)
- The Planning and Compensation Act 1991 (Amendment of Schedule 18) (No. 2) Order 1999 (S.I. 1999 No. 1765)
- The Scottish Parliamentary Elections (Returning Officers' Charges) Amendment Order 1999 (S.I. 1999 No. 1766)
- The Osteopaths Act 1993 (Commencement No. 4) Order 1999 (S.I. 1999 No. 1767 (C. 49)])
- The Mount Vernon and Watford Hospitals National Health Service Trust (Establishment) Amendment Order 1999 (S.I. 1999 No. 1768)
- The Hillingdon Hospital National Health Service Trust (Establishment) Amendment Order 1999 (S.I. 1999 No. 1769)
- The Wiltshire and Swindon Health Care National Health Service Trust (Establishment) Order 1999 (S.I. 1999 No. 1770)
- The Wiltshire Health Care and the East Wiltshire Health Care National Health Service Trusts (Dissolution) Order 1999 (S.I. 1999 No. 1771)
- The Newham Community Health Services National Health Service Trust (Establishment) Amendment Order 1999 (S.I. 1999 No. 1773)
- The Wireless Telegraphy (Licence Charges) Regulations 1999 (S.I. 1999 No. 1774)
- The Federal Republic of Yugoslavia (Supply and Sale of Equipment) (Penalties and Licences) (Amendment) Regulations 1999 (S.I. 1999 No. 1775)
- The Export of Goods (Control) (Iraq and Kuwait Sanctions) (Amendment) Order 1999 (S.I. 1999 No. 1776)
- The Export of Goods (Control) (Amendment No. 3) Order 1999 (S.I. 1999 No. 1777)
- The Dual-Use and Related Goods (Export Control) (Amendment No. 2) Regulations 1999 (S.I. 1999 No. 1778)
- The Education (Transfer of Functions Concerning School Lunches) (Wales) (No. 2) Order 1999 (S.I. 1999 No. 1779)
- The Education (Maintained Special Schools) (Wales) Regulations 1999 (S.I. 1999 No. 1780)
- The Education (Individual Pupil Information) (Prescribed Persons) (Wales) Regulations 1999 (S.I. 1999 No. 1781)
- The Local Government Reorganisation (Wales) (Capital Finance) (Amendment) Order 1999 (S.I. 1999 No. 1782)
- The Environmental Impact Assessment (Land Drainage Improvement Works) Regulations 1999 (S.I. 1999 No. 1783)
- The Education (Student Loans) (Amendment) Regulations 1999 (S.I. 1999 No. 1784)
- Act of Sederunt (Rules of the Court of Session Amendment No.6) (Causes Relating to Intellectual Property) 1999 (S.I. 1999 No. 1785 (S.109)])
- The Federal Republic of Yugoslavia (Freezing of Funds and Prohibition on Investment) Regulations 1999 (S.I. 1999 No. 1786)
- The Government of Wales Act (Complaints of Maladministration) (Transitional and Saving Provisions) Order 1999 (S.I. 1999 No. 1791)
- The Food (Peanuts from Egypt) (Emergency Control) Order 1999 (S.I. 1999 No. 1800)

== 1801–1900 ==
- The Marketing of Ornamental Plant Propagating Material Regulations 1999 (S.I. 1999 No. 1801)
- The Charles Keene College of Further Education, Leicester and Leicester South Fields College (Dissolution) Order 1999 (S.I. 1999 No. 1802)
- The Assured and Protected Tenancies (Lettings to Students) (Amendment) Regulations 1999 (S.I. 1999 No. 1803)
- The Equality Commission for Northern Ireland (Supplementary Provisions) (Northern Ireland) Order 1999 (S.I. 1999 No. 1804)
- The A205 Trunk Road (Southwark) Red Route Traffic Order 1999 (S.I. 1999 No. 1805)
- The Town and Country Planning (Control of Advertisements) (Amendment) Regulations 1999 (S.I. 1999 No. 1810)
- The Education (School Performance and Unauthorised Absence Targets) (Wales) Regulations 1999 (S.I. 1999 No. 1811)
- The Education (School Information) (Wales) Regulations 1999 (S.I. 1999 No. 1812)
- The Prevention of Terrorism (Temporary Provisions) Act 1989 (Revival of Parts IVA and IVB) Order 1999 (S.I. 1999 No. 1813)
- The Designation of Schools Having a Religious Character (Wales) Order 1999 (S.I. 1999 No. 1814)
- The Education (National Curriculum) (Temporary Exceptions for Individual Pupils) (Wales) Regulations 1999 (S.I. 1999 No. 1815)
- The Late Payment of Commercial Debts (Interest) Act 1998 (Commencement No. 2) Order 1999 (S.I. 1999 No. 1816 (C. 50)])
- The Potato Marketing Board (Dissolution) Order 1999 (S.I. 1999 No. 1817)
- The Scotland Act 1998 (Consequential Modifications) (No.2) Order 1999 (S.I. 1999 No. 1820)
- The Royal Hospital of St. Bartholomew, the Royal London Hospital and London Chest Hospital National Health Service Trust (Change of Name) Order 1999 (S.I. 1999 No. 1823)
- The Education (Mandatory Awards) (Amendment) Regulations 1999 (S.I. 1999 No. 1824)
- The Leicestershire and Rutland Healthcare National Health Service Trust (Establishment) Amendment Order 1999 (S.I. 1999 No. 1825)
- The Road Traffic (NHS Charges) (Scotland) Order 1999 (S.I. 1999 No. 1842 (S.110)])
- The Road Traffic (NHS Charges) (Reviews and Appeals) (Scotland) Regulations 1999 (S.I. 1999 No. 1843 (S. 111)])
- The Cigarette Lighter Refill (Safety) Regulations 1999 (S.I. 1999 No. 1844)
- Register of County Court Judgments (Amendment) Regulations 1999 (S.I. 1999 No. 1845 (L. 17)])
- The General Osteopathic Council (Fraud or Error and Appeals) Rules Order of Council 1999 (S.I. 1999 No. 1846)
- The General Osteopathic Council (Investigation of Complaints) (Procedure) Rules Order of Council 1999 (S.I. 1999 No. 1847)
- The General Osteopathic Council (Legal Assessors) Rules Order of Council 1999 (S.I. 1999 No. 1848)
- The Occupational Pension Schemes (Investment, and Assignment, Forfeiture, Bankruptcy etc.) Amendment Regulations 1999 (S.I. 1999 No. 1849)
- The Fixed Penalty Offences Order 1999 (S.I. 1999 No. 1851)
- The Local Authorities (Capital Finance and Approved Investments) (Amendment) Regulations 1999 (S.I. 1999 No. 1852)
- The Professions Supplementary to Medicine (Paramedics Board) Order of Council 1999 (S.I. 1999 No. 1853)
- The Professions Supplementary to Medicine (Clinical Scientists Board) Order of Council 1999 (S.I. 1999 No. 1854)
- The Professions Supplementary to Medicine (Speech and Language Therapists Board) Order of Council 1999 (S.I. 1999 No. 1855)
- The General Chiropractic Council (Registration) Rules Order of Council 1999 (S.I. 1999 No. 1856)
- The General Chiropractic Council (Registration During Transitional Period) Rules Order of Council 1999 (S.I. 1999 No. 1857)
- The East Kent Hospitals National Health Service Trust (Establishment) Amendment Order 1999 (S.I. 1999 No. 1858)
- The Civil Aviation (Route Charges For Navigation Services) (Third Amendment) (Revocation) Regulations 1999 (S.I. 1999 No. 1859)
- The Cereal Seeds (Amendment) Regulations 1999 (S.I. 1999 No. 1860)
- The Beet Seeds (Amendment) Regulations 1999 (S.I. 1999 No. 1861)
- The Oil and Fibre Plant Seeds (Amendment) Regulations 1999 (S.I. 1999 No. 1862)
- The Vegetable Seeds (Amendment) Regulations 1999 (S.I. 1999 No. 1863)
- The Fodder Plant Seeds (Amendment) Regulations 1999 (S.I. 1999 No. 1864)
- The Seeds (Fees) (Amendment) (No. 2) Regulations 1999 (S.I. 1999 No. 1865)
- The Education (Further Education in Schools) Regulations 1999 (S.I. 1999 No. 1867)
- The Education (Exclusion from School) (Prescribed Periods) Regulations 1999 (S.I. 1999 No. 1868)
- The Merchant Shipping (Counting and Registration of Persons on Board Passenger Ships) Regulations 1999 (S.I. 1999 No. 1869)
- The Combined Probation Areas (Lincolnshire) Order 1999 (S.I. 1999 No. 1870)
- The Feedingstuffs (Zootechnical Products) Regulations 1999 (S.I. 1999 No. 1871)
- The Feeding Stuffs (Establishments and Intermediaries) Regulations 1999 (S.I. 1999 No. 1872)
- The Tayside Primary Care National Health Service Trust (Establishment) Amendment Order 1999 (S.I. 1999 No. 1875 (S. 112)])
- The Cross-Border Credit Transfers Regulations 1999 (S.I. 1999 No. 1876)
- The Fire Precautions (Workplace) (Amendment) Regulations 1999 (S.I. 1999 No. 1877)
- The National Lottery Charities Board (Increase in Membership) (Revocation) Order 1999 (S.I. 1999 No. 1878)

The General Osteopathic Council (Medical Assessors) Rules Order of Council 1999 (S.I. 1999 No. 1879)* The Social Fund Winter Fuel Payment Amendment Regulations 1999 ([http://www.legislation.gov.uk/uksi/1999/1880/contents/made S.I. 1999 No. 1880)

- The Scotland Act 1998 (Transitory and Transitional Provisions) (Grants to Members and Officeholders and Scottish Parliamentary Pension Scheme) Amendment Order 1999 (S.I. 1999 No. 1891)
- The Town and Country Planning (Trees) Regulations 1999 (S.I. 1999 No. 1892)
- The Patents and Trade Marks (World Trade Organisation) Regulations 1999 (S.I. 1999 No. 1899)
- The Education (Parent Governor Representatives) (Wales) Regulations 1999 (S.I. 1999 No. 1900)

== 1901–2000 ==
- The Health Authorities (Membership and Procedure) Amendment (Wales) Regulations 1999 (S.I. 1999 No. 1901)
- The National Health Service (Functions of Health Authorities and Administration Arrangements) Amendment (Wales) Regulations 1999 (S.I. 1999 No. 1902)
- The A40 Trunk Road (Old Oak Common Lane And Old Oak Road, Ealing And Hammersmith And Fulham) (Prohibition Of Traffic Movements) Order 1999 (S.I. 1999 No. 1914)
- The Road Traffic (Parking Adjudicators) (England and Wales) Regulations 1999 (S.I. 1999 No. 1918)
- The Greenhill College, Harrow and Weald College, Harrow (Dissolution) Order 1999 (S.I. 1999 No. 1919)
- The Income Support (General) and Jobseeker's Allowance Amendment Regulations 1999 (S.I. 1999 No. 1921)
- The Merchant Shipping (Liability of Shipowners and Others) (Rate Of Interest) Order 1999 (S.I. 1999 No. 1922)
- The Merchant Shipping (Fees) (Amendment No. 2) Regulations 1999 (S.I. 1999 No. 1923)
- The Collective Redundancies and Transfer of Undertakings (Protection of Employment) (Amendment) Regulations 1999 (S.I. 1999 No. 1925)
- The Football Spectators (Seating) Order 1999 (S.I. 1999 No. 1926)
- The Double Taxation Relief (Taxes on Income) (General) (Dividend) (Revocation) Regulations 1999 (S.I. 1999 No. 1927)
- The Taxes (Interest Rate) (Amendment No. 2) Regulations 1999 (S.I. 1999 No. 1928)
- The Corporation Tax (Instalment Payments) (Amendment) Regulations 1999 (S.I. 1999 No. 1929)
- The Safety of Sports Grounds (Designation) Order 1999 (S.I. 1999 No. 1930)
- The Rail Vehicle Accessibility (Anglia Railways Class 170/2 Vehicles) Exemption Order 1999 (S.I. 1999 No. 1931)
- The Rail Vehicle Accessibility (Central Trains Class 170/5 Vehicles) Exemption Order 1999 (S.I. 1999 No. 1932)
- The Postal Privilege (Suspension) Order 1999 (S.I. 1999 No. 1933)
- The A30 Trunk Road (Tavistock Road Junction) (Detrunking) Order 1999 (S.I. 1999 No. 1934)
- The Social Security Amendment (Students) Regulations 1999 (S.I. 1999 No. 1935)
- The Education (Parent Governor Representatives) Regulations 1999 (S.I. 1999 No. 1949)
- The Capital Gains Tax (Definition of Permanent Interest Bearing Share) Regulations 1999 (S.I. 1999 No. 1953)
- The Education (Education Standards Etc. Grants) (England) Regulations 1999 (Amendment) Regulations 1999 (S.I. 1999 No. 1955)
- The Consumer Credit (Exempt Agreements) (Amendment) Order 1999 (S.I. 1999 No. 1956)
- The Merchant Shipping (Marine Equipment) Regulations 1999 (S.I. 1999 No. 1957)
- The Social Security Act 1998 (Commencement No. 8, and Savings and Consequential and Transitional Provisions) Order 1999 (S.I. 1999 No. 1958 (C.51)])
- The Road Vehicles (Construction and Use) (Amendment No. 2) Regulation 1999 (S.I. 1999 No. 1959)
- The Retirement Benefits Schemes (Continuation of Rights of Members of Approved Schemes) (Amendment) Regulations 1999 (S.I. 1999 No. 1963)
- The Retirement Benefits Schemes (Restriction on Discretion to Approve) (Additional Voluntary Contributions) (Amendment) Regulations 1999 (S.I. 1999 No. 1964)
- The Social Security (Contributions) (Amendment No. 4) Regulations 1999 (S.I. 1999 No. 1965)
- The Social Security (Contributions) (Amendment No. 4) (Northern Ireland) Regulations 1999 (S.I. 1999 No. 1966)
- The A13 Trunk Road (Tower Hamlets) Red Route Experimental Traffic Order 1998 Experimental Variation (No. 2) Order 1999 (S.I. 1999 No. 1974)
- The Channel Tunnel Rail Link (Nomination) (London Underground Works) Order 1999 (S.I. 1999 No. 1985)
- The A5 Trunk Road (Nesscliffe Bypass) Detrunking Order 1999 (S.I. 1999 No. 1986)
- The A5 Trunk Road (Nesscliffe Bypass) Order 1999 (S.I. 1999 No. 1987)
- The West Midlands (Coroners' Districts) (Amendment) Order 1999 (S.I. 1999 No. 1990)
- The A205 Trunk Road (Lewisham) Red Route Experimental Traffic Order 1998 Experimental Variation Order 1999 (S.I. 1999 No. 1991)
- The Disability Discrimination Code of Practice (Goods, Facilities, Services and Premises) Order 1999 (S.I. 1999 No. 1992)
- The Patent Office (Address) (Revocation) Rules 1999 (S.I. 1999 No. 1993)
- The Value Added Tax (Sport, Sports Competitions and Physical Education) Order 1999 (S.I. 1999 No. 1994)
- The New Northern Ireland Assembly (Salaries and Allowances) Order 1999 (S.I. 1999 No. 1995)
- The Independent Analogue Broadcasters (Reservation of Digital Capacity) (Amendment) Order 1999 (S.I. 1999 No. 1996)
- The Holme Lacy College (Dissolution) Order 1999 (S.I. 1999 No. 1997)
- The Railways Act 1993 (Consequential Modifications) (No. 2) Order 1999 (S.I. 1999 No. 1998)
- The Northern Ireland Act 1974 (Interim Period Extension) Order 1999 (S.I. 1999 No. 2000)

== 2001–2100 ==
- The Pressure Equipment Regulations 1999 (S.I. 1999 No. 2001)
- The Magistrates' Courts (Reciprocal Enforcement of Maintenance Orders) (Hague Convention Countries) Rules 1999 (S.I. 1999 No. 2002 (L.17)])
- The Yugoslavia (Prohibition of Flights) Regulations 1999 (S.I. 1999 No. 2018)
- The General Teaching Council for England (Constitution) (Amendment) Regulations 1999 (S.I. 1999 No. 2019)
- The Education (Grants in respect of Voluntary Aided Schools) Regulations 1999 (S.I. 1999 No. 2020)
- The Education (Code of Practice on LEA – School Relations) (Appointed Day) (Wales) Order 1999 (S.I. 1999 No. 2022)
- The Local Government Act 1988 (Defined Activities) (Exemptions) (No. 1) (England) Order 1999 (S.I. 1999 No. 2023)
- The Quarries Regulations 1999 (S.I. 1999 No. 2024)
- The Food (Animals and Animal Products from Belgium) (Emergency Control) (England and Wales) Order 1999 (S.I. 1999 No. 2025)
- The Animal Feedingstuffs from Belgium (Control) (England and Wales) Regulations 1999 (S.I. 1999 No. 2026)
- The European Communities (Designation) (No. 2) Order 1999 (S.I. 1999 No. 2027)
- The Parliamentary Commissioner (No. 2) Order 1999 (S.I. 1999 No. 2028)
- The Dockyard Port of Plymouth Order 1999 (S.I. 1999 No. 2029)
- The Child Abduction and Custody (Parties to Conventions) (Amendment) Order 1999 (S.I. 1999 No. 2030)
- The Continental Shelf (Designation of Areas) Order 1999 (S.I. 1999 No. 2031)
- The Intelsat (Immunities and Privileges) (Amendment) Order 1999 (S.I. 1999 No. 2032)
- The International Copper Study Group (Legal Capacities) Order 1999 (S.I. 1999 No. 2033)
- The International Organisations (Immunities and Privileges) Miscellaneous Provisions Order 1999 (S.I. 1999 No. 2034)
- The European Convention on Extradition Order 1990 (Amendment) Order 1999 (S.I. 1999 No. 2035)
- The Double Taxation Relief (Taxes on Income) (Kuwait) Order 1999 (S.I. 1999 No. 2036)
- The Ministerial and other Salaries Order 1999 (S.I. 1999 No. 2037)
- The Social Security (Transfer of Staff) (Northern Ireland) Order 1999 (S.I. 1999 No. 2038)
- The Education (Inspectors of Schools in Wales) (No. 3) Order 1999 (S.I. 1999 No. 2039)
- Surrey County Council (New Temporary Road Bridge, Walton) Scheme 1998 Confirmation Instrument 1999 (SI 1999 No. 2058)
- The Air Navigation (Fifth Amendment) Order 1999 (S.I. 1999 No. 2059)
- The National Savings Bank (Investment Deposits) (Limits) (Amendment) (No. 2) Order 1999 (S.I. 1999 No. 2060)
- The North/South Co-operation (Implementation Bodies) (Amendment) (Northern Ireland) Order 1999 (S.I. 1999 No. 2062)
- The Landfill Tax (Site Restoration and Quarries) Order 1999 (S.I. 1999 No. 2075)
- The Value Added Tax (Refund of Tax) Order 1999 (S.I. 1999 No. 2076)
- The Motor Vehicles (Approval) (Amendment) Regulations 1999 (S.I. 1999 No. 2082)
- Unfair Terms in Consumer Contracts Regulations 1999 (S.I. 1999 No. 2083)
- The Dangerous Substances and Preparations (Safety) (Consolidation) (Amendment) Regulations 1999 (S.I. 1999 No. 2084)
- The Redbridge Health Care National Health Service Trust (Establishment) Amendment Order 1999 (S.I. 1999 No. 2085)
- The Legal Advice and Assistance at Police Stations (Remuneration) (Amendment) Regulations 1999 (S.I. 1999 No. 2088)
- The Legal Advice and Assistance (Amendment) (No. 2) Regulations 1999 (S.I. 1999 No. 2089)
- The National Lottery etc. Act 1993 (Amendment of Section 23) (No. 2) Order 1999 (S.I. 1999 No. 2090)
- The Dual-Use and Related Goods (Export Control) (Amendment No. 3) Regulations 1999 (S.I. 1999 No. 2091)
- The Superannuation (Application of the Superannuation Act 1972, Section 1) (No.2) Order 1999 (S.I. 1999 No. 2092)
- The Telecommunications (Data Protection and Privacy) Regulations 1999 (S.I. 1999 No. 2093)
- The Banking (Gibraltar) Regulations 1999 (S.I. 1999 No. 2094)
- The Forgery and Counterfeiting (Protected Coins) Order 1999 (S.I. 1999 No. 2095)
- The Costs in Criminal Cases (General) (Amendment) Regulations 1999 (S.I. 1999 No. 2096)
- The Land Registration (No. 2) Rules 1999 (S.I. 1999 No. 2097)
- The Parliamentary Pensions (Amendment) Regulations 1999 (S.I. 1999 No. 2100)

== 2101–2200 ==
- The European Parliamentary (United Kingdom Representatives) Pensions (Additional Voluntary Contributions Scheme) (Amendment) Order 1999 (S.I. 1999 No. 2101)
- The Education (Substituted Grammar Schools) Regulations 1999 (S.I. 1999 No. 2102)
- The Education (Proposals for Grammar Schools to cease to have Selective Admission Arrangements) Regulations 1999 (S.I. 1999 No. 2103)
- The Education (Annual Parents' Meetings) (England) Regulations 1999 (S.I. 1999 No. 2104)
- The Local Authorities (Contracting Out of Highway Functions) Order 1999 (S.I. 1999 No. 2106)
- The Postal Services Regulations 1999 (S.I. 1999 No. 2107)
- The Legal Officers (Annual Fees) Order 1999 (S.I. 1999 No. 2108)
- The Medicines (Aristolochia) (Emergency Prohibition) Order 1999 (S.I. 1999 No. 2109)
- The Ecclesiastical Judges, Legal Officers and Others (Fees) Order 1999 (S.I. 1999 No. 2110)
- The Care of Places of Worship Rules 1999 (S.I. 1999 No. 2111)
- The Church Representation Rules (Amendment) Resolution 1999 (S.I. 1999 No. 2112)
- The Parochial Fees Order 1999 (S.I. 1999 No. 2113)
- The Disability Discrimination (Description of Insurance Services) Regulations 1999 (S.I. 1999 No. 2114)
- The Public Processions (Northern Ireland) Act 1998 (Guidelines) Order 1999 (S.I. 1999 No. 2115)
- The Public Processions (Northern Ireland) Act 1998 (Code of Conduct) Order 1999 (S.I. 1999 No. 2116)
- The Public Processions (Northern Ireland) Act 1998 (Procedural Rules) Order 1999 (S.I. 1999 No. 2117)
- The Gifts for Relief in Poor Countries (Designation of Kosovo) Order 1999 (S.I. 1999 No. 2118)
- The Finance Act 1998, Section 83(1), (Appointed Day) Order 1999 (S.I. 1999 No. 2119 (C.55)])
- The Stansted Airport Aircraft Movement Limit (Amendment) Order 1999 (S.I. 1999 No. 2120)
- The Merchant Shipping (Reporting Requirements for Ships carrying Dangerous or Polluting Goods) (Amendment) Regulations 1999 (S.I. 1999 No. 2121)
- The A41 Trunk Road (No Man's Heath and Macefen Bypass and Detrunking) Order 1999 (S.I. 1999 No. 2122)
- The Legal Aid in Criminal and Care Proceedings (General) (Amendment) (No. 3) Regulations 1999 (S.I. 1999 No. 2123)
- The Legal Aid in Criminal and Care Proceedings (Costs) (Amendment) (No. 3) Regulations 1999 (S.I. 1999 No. 2124)
- The Public Airport Companies (Capital Finance) (Second Amendment) Order 1999 (S.I. 1999 No. 2125)
- The Plant Health (Amendment) (England) Order 1999 (S.I. 1999 No. 2126)
- The A205 Trunk Road (Hounslow) Red Route (Bus Priority) Traffic Order 1999 (S.I. 1999 No. 2127)
- The Contracting Out (Jury Summoning Functions) Order 1999 (S.I. 1999 No. 2128)
- Welsh Highland Railway Order 1999 (S.I. 1999 No. 2129)
- The Nursery Education (England) (Amendment) (No. 2) Regulations 1999 (S.I. 1999 No. 2130)
- Northern Ireland Act Tribunal (Procedure) Rules 1999 (S.I. 1999 No. 2131)
- The New Forest (Confirmation of the Byelaws of the Verderers of the New Forest) Order 1999 (S.I. 1999 No. 2134)
- The Allocation of Housing and Homelessness (Amendment) (England) Regulations 1999 (S.I. 1999 No. 2135)
- The Deregulation (Casinos) Order 1999 (S.I. 1999 No. 2136)
- The Deregulation (Millennium Licensing) Order 1999 (S.I. 1999 No. 2137)
- The Appointment of Queen's Counsel Fees Order 1999 (S.I. 1999 No. 2138)
- The Motor Vehicles (Type Approval and Approval Marks) (Fees) Regulations 1999 (S.I. 1999 No. 2149)
- The Travel Documents (Refugees and Stateless Persons) (Fees) Regulations 1999 (S.I. 1999 No. 2150)
- The Income Tax (Employments) (Amendment No. 3) Regulations 1999 (S.I. 1999 No. 2155)
- The Finance Act 1995, Section 139(3), (Appointed Day) Order 1999 (S.I. 1999 No. 2156 (C. 52)])
- The Education (Governors' Annual Reports) (England) Regulations 1999 (S.I. 1999 No. 2157)
- The Education (School Performance Information) (England) (Amendment) Regulations 1999 (S.I. 1999 No. 2158)
- The Income Tax (Sub-contractors in the Construction Industry) (Amendment No. 2) Regulations 1999 (S.I. 1999 No. 2159)
- The Education (School Teachers' Pay and Conditions) (No. 2) Order 1999 (S.I. 1999 No. 2160)
- The Education (Bursaries for Teacher Training) (Revocation) (England) Regulations 1999 (S.I. 1999 No. 2162)
- The Education (School Government) (England) Regulations 1999 (S.I. 1999 No. 2163)
- The Education (Transfer of Functions Concerning School Lunches etc.) (England) (No. 2) Order 1999 (S.I. 1999 No. 2164)
- The Social Security Amendment (Sports Awards) Regulations 1999 (S.I. 1999 No. 2165)
- The Education (Teachers’ Qualifications and Health Standards) (England) Regulations 1999 (S.I. 1999 No. 2166)
- The Unfair Arbitration Agreements (Specified Amount) Order 1999 (S.I. 1999 No. 2167)
- The Education Maintenance Allowance (Pilot Areas) Regulations 1999 (S.I. 1999 No. 2168)
- The Local Government Act 1999 (Commencement No. 1) Order 1999 (S.I. 1999 No. 2169 (C. 53)])
- The Environmental Protection (Restriction on Use of Lead Shot) (England) Regulations 1999 (S.I. 1999 No. 2170)
- The Salford Royal Hospitals National Health Service Trust (Establishment) Amendment Order 1999 (S.I. 1999 No. 2176)
- The Health Act 1999 (Commencement No. 1) Order 1999 (S.I. 1999 No. 2177 (C.54)])
- The Education (National Curriculum) (Key Stage 1 Assessment Arrangements) (England) (Amendment) Order 1999 (S.I. 1999 No. 2187)
- The Education (National Curriculum) (Key Stage 2 Assessment Arrangements) (England) Order 1999 (S.I. 1999 No. 2188)
- The Education (National Curriculum) (Key Stage 3 Assessment Arrangements) (England) Order 1999 (S.I. 1999 No. 2189)
- The Cereal Seeds (Amendment) (England) Regulations 1999 (S.I. 1999 No. 2196)
- The Countryside Access (Amendment) (No. 2) Regulations 1999 (S.I. 1999 No. 2197)
- The Channel Tunnel Rail Link (Nomination) (London Underground Works) (Amendment) Order 1999 (S.I. 1999 No. 2198)
- The Motor Vehicles (Tests) (Amendment) Regulations 1999 (S.I. 1999 No. 2199)

== 2201–2300 ==
- The Northern Ireland Act 1998 (Commencement No. 3) Order 1999 (S.I. 1999 No. 2204 (C.56)])
- The Merchant Shipping and Fishing Vessels (Personal Protective Equipment) Regulations 1999 (S.I. 1999 No. 2205)
- The Offshore Installations (Safety Zones) (No. 3) Order 1999 (S.I. 1999 No. 2206)
- The Dartford-Thurrock Crossing Tolls Order 1999 (S.I. 1999 No. 2207)
- The Dartford-Thurrock Crossing (Amendment) Regulations 1999 (S.I. 1999 No. 2208)
- The Magistrates' Courts Committees (South Yorkshire) Amalgamation Order 1999 (S.I. 1999 No. 2209)
- The Disability Rights Commission Act 1999 (Commencement No. 1 and Transitional Provision) Order 1999 (S.I. 1999 No. 2210 (C.57)])
- The Education (Induction Arrangements for School Teachers) (Amendment) (England) Regulations 1999 (S.I. 1999 No. 2211)
- The Education (Maintained Special Schools) (England) Regulations 1999 (S.I. 1999 No. 2212)
- The Education (School Organisation Proposals) (England) Regulations 1999 (S.I. 1999 No. 2213)
- The Education (National Curriculum) (Modern Foreign Languages) (Amendment) Order 1999 (S.I. 1999 No. 2214)
- The A205 Trunk Road (Lambeth) Red Route Traffic Order 1999 (S.I. 1999 No. 2217)
- The National Institute for Clinical Excellence (Amendment) Regulations 1999 (S.I. 1999 No. 2218)
- The National Institute for Clinical Excellence (Establishment and Constitution) Amendment Order 1999 (S.I. 1999 No. 2219)
- The Arnold and Carlton College, Nottingham (Dissolution) Order 1999 (S.I. 1999 No. 2220)
- The School Standards and Framework Act 1998 (Appointed Day) (England) Order 1999 (S.I. 1999 No. 2221)
- The Paying Agency (National Assembly for Wales) Regulations 1999 (S.I. 1999 No. 2223)
- The Films (Certification) (Amendment) Regulations 1999 (S.I. 1999 No. 2224)
- The Child Benefit (Northern Ireland Reciprocal Arrangements) Amendment Regulations 1999 (S.I. 1999 No. 2225)
- The Social Security (Incapacity Benefit and Jobseeker's Allowance) Amendment Regulations 1999 (S.I. 1999 No. 2226)
- The Social Security (Northern Ireland Reciprocal Arrangements) Amendment Regulations 1999 (S.I. 1999 No. 2227)
- The Environmental Impact Assessment (Forestry) (England and Wales) Regulations 1999 (S.I. 1999 No. 2228)
- The Health Service Medicines (Consent to Voluntary Scheme) Regulations 1999 (S.I. 1999 No. 2229)
- The Agricultural Holdings (Units of Production) (England) Order 1999 (S.I. 1999 No. 2230)
- The Environmentally Sensitive Areas (England) Designation Orders (Revocation of Specified Provisions) Regulations 1999 (S.I. 1999 No. 2231)
- The Environmentally Sensitive Areas (Essex Coast) Designation (Amendment) Order 1999 (S.I. 1999 No. 2232)
- The Environmentally Sensitive Areas (Blackdown Hills) Designation (Amendment) Order 1999 (S.I. 1999 No. 2233)
- The Environmentally Sensitive Areas (Cotswold Hills) Designation (Amendment) Order 1999 (S.I. 1999 No. 2234)
- The Environmentally Sensitive Areas (Shropshire Hills) Designation (Amendment) Order 1999 (S.I. 1999 No. 2235)
- The Environmentally Sensitive Areas (Dartmoor) Designation (Amendment) Order 1999 (S.I. 1999 No. 2236)
- The Environmentally Sensitive Areas (Upper Thames Tributaries) Designation (Amendment) Order 1999 (S.I. 1999 No. 2237)
- The Education (School Government) (Wales) Regulations 1999 (S.I. 1999 No. 2242 (W.2)])
- The Education (New Schools) (Wales) Regulations 1999 (S.I. 1999 No. 2243 (w.3)])
- The Railway Safety Regulations 1999 (S.I. 1999 No. 2244)
- The Licensing of Air Carriers Regulations 1999 (S.I. 1999 No. 2245)
- The Aeroplane Noise (Amendment) Regulations 1999 (S.I. 1999 No. 2253)
- The Land Registration Fees Order 1999 (S.I. 1999 No. 2254)
- The Education (School Sessions and Charges and Remissions Policies) (Information) (England) Regulations 1999 (S.I. 1999 No. 2255)
- The Education (Modification of Enactments Relating to Employment) Order 1999 (S.I. 1999 No. 2256)
- The Education (Non-Maintained Special Schools) (England) Regulations 1999 (S.I. 1999 No. 2257)
- The Education (School Meals Staff) (England) Regulations 1999 (S.I. 1999 No. 2258)
- The Education (Change of Category of Maintained Schools) (England) Regulations 1999 (S.I. 1999 No. 2259)
- The Education Act 1996 (Modification of Section 517) Regulations 1999 (S.I. 1999 No. 2260)
- The Education (School Teacher Appraisal) (Amendment) (England) Regulations 1999 (S.I. 1999 No. 2261)
- The Education (New Schools) (England) Regulations 1999 (S.I. 1999 No. 2262)
- The Education (Student Support) (Dance and Drama) Regulations 1999 (S.I. 1999 No. 2263)
- The Education (Grants) (Dance and Drama) (England) Regulations 1999 (S.I. 1999 No. 2264)
- The Education (Student Fees) (Exceptions) (England) Regulations 1999 (S.I. 1999 No. 2265)
- The Education (Student Support) (Amendment) Regulations 1999 (S.I. 1999 No. 2266)
- Education (Transition to New Framework) (Miscellaneous Provisions) Regulations 1999 (S.I. 1999 No. 2267)
- The Assured and Protected Tenancies (Lettings to Students) (Amendment) (No. 2) (England) Regulations 1999 (S.I. 1999 No. 2268)
- The Further Education Funding Council for England (Supplementary Functions) Order 1999 (S.I. 1999 No. 2269)
- The Education (Student Support) (European Institutions) Regulations 1999 (S.I. 1999 No. 2270)
- The Education (Schedule 32 to the School Standards and Framework Act 1998) (England) (No. 2) Regulations 1999 (S.I. 1999 No. 2271)
- The A1 Trunk Road (Ferrybridge To Selby Fork Junction) (Detrunking) Order 1999 (S.I. 1999 No. 2272)
- The A1 Motorway (Ferrybridge To Hook Moor Section And Connecting Roads) Scheme 1999 (S.I. 1999 No. 2273)
- The A1 Trunk Road (Spitalgap Lane to Trinity Farm) Order 1999 (S.I. 1999 No. 2274)
- The A63 Trunk Road (Selby Fork And Boot And Shoe Junctions) Order 1999 (S.I. 1999 No. 2275)
- The Civil Aviation (Route Charges for Navigation Services) (Fourth Amendment) Regulations 1999 (S.I. 1999 No. 2276)
- The Redundancy Payments (Continuity of Employment in Local Government, etc.) (Modification) Order 1999 (S.I. 1999 No. 2277)
- The South of Luton-Watford Gap-Dunchurch Special Road Scheme 1956 (Partial Revocation) Scheme 1999 (S.I. 1999 No. 2278)
- The M1 Motorway (Junction 15) Detrunking Order 1999 (S.I. 1999 No. 2279)
- The M1 Motorway (Junction 15) Connecting Roads Scheme 1999 (S.I. 1999 No. 2280)
- The Competition Act 1998 (Provisional Immunity from Penalties) Regulations 1999 (S.I. 1999 No. 2281)
- The Competition Act 1998 (Definition of Appropriate Person) Regulations 1999 (S.I. 1999 No. 2282)
- The Judicial Pensions (Qualifying Judicial Offices) (President of the Competition Commission Appeal Tribunals) Order 1999 (S.I. 1999 No. 2283)
- The Central Manchester Healthcare National Health Service Trust (Transfer of Trust Property) Order 1999 (S.I. 1999 No. 2298)

== 2301–2400 ==
- The Wigan and Leigh Health Services National Health Service Trust (Establishment) Amendment Order 1999 (S.I. 1999 No. 2307)
- The Blackburn, Hyndburn and Ribble Valley Health Care National Health Service Trust (Establishment) Amendment Order 1999 (S.I. 1999 No. 2308)
- The Local Government (Discretionary Payments) (Amendment No. 2) Regulations 1999 (S.I. 1999 No. 2311)
- The Hamilton Oxford Schools Partnership Education Action Zone Order 1999 (S.I. 1999 No. 2312)
- The Greenwich—Time to Succeed Education Action Zone Order 1999 (S.I. 1999 No. 2313)
- The Education (Modification of Instruments Relating to Voluntary Schools) Regulations 1999 (S.I. 1999 No. 2314)
- The Relocation Grants (Form of Application) (Welsh Form of Application) Regulations 1999 (S.I. 1999 No. 2315)
- The Housing Renewal Grants (Prescribed Form and Particulars) (Welsh Form and Particulars) (Amendment) Regulations 1999 (S.I. 1999 No. 2316)
- The Companies (Contents of Annual Return) Regulations 1999 (S.I. 1999 No. 2322)
- The School Standards and Framework Act 1998 (Commencement No. 7 and Saving and Transitional Provisions) Order 1999 (S.I. 1999 No. 2323 (c. 59)])
- The Motor Vehicles (EC Type Approval) (Amendment No. 2) Regulations 1999 (S.I. 1999 No. 2324)
- The Feeding Stuffs (Enforcement) Regulations 1999 (S.I. 1999 No. 2325)
- The Food (Animals and Animal Products from Belgium) (Emergency Control) (England and Wales) (No. 2) Order 1999 (S.I. 1999 No. 2332)
- The Animal Feedingstuffs from Belgium (Control) (England and Wales) (No. 2) Regulations 1999 (S.I. 1999 No. 2333)
- The Films (Certification) (Amendment) (No. 2) Regulations 1999 (S.I. 1999 No. 2334)
- The Railtrack (Leeds Bridges) Order 1999 (S.I. 1999 No. 2336)
- The Primary Care Trusts (Consultation on Establishment, Dissolution and Transfer of Staff) Regulations 1999 (S.I. 1999 No. 2337)
- The Health Act 1999 (Commencement No. 2) Order 1999 (S.I. 1999 No. 2342 (C. 60)])
- The A205 Trunk Road (Lewisham) Red Route (Prohibited Turns) Traffic Order 1999 (S.I. 1999 No. 2343)
- The A3 Trunk Road (Wandsworth) Red Route Traffic Order 1999 (S.I. 1999 No. 2344)
- The A40 Trunk Road (Ealing and Hammersmith & Fulham) Red Route (Clearway) Experimental Traffic Order 1999 (S.I. 1999 No. 2345)
- The A4 Trunk Road (Hillingdon and Hounslow) Red Route Traffic Order 1997 Variation Order 1999 (S.I. 1999 No. 2346)
- The A205 Trunk Road (Lambeth) Red Route (Prohibition of Traffic) Traffic Order 1999 (S.I. 1999 No. 2348)
- The A40 Trunk Road (Ealing and Hammersmith & Fulham) Red Route Experimental Traffic Order 1999 (S.I. 1999 No. 2349)
- The Companies (Forms) (Amendment) Regulations 1999 (S.I. 1999 No. 2356)
- The Companies (Welsh Language Forms) (Amendment) Regulations 1999 (S.I. 1999 No. 2357)
- Rheoliadau (Diwygio) (Ffurflenni Cymraeg) CwmnÏau 1999 (S.I. 1999 Rhif 2357)
- The Social Security (Claims and Payments) Amendment Regulations 1999 (S.I. 1999 No. 2358)
- The M61 Motorway (Kearsley Spur) (Speed Limit) Regulations 1999 (S.I. 1999 No. 2359)
- The Distress for Rent (Amendment) Rules 1999 (S.I. 1999 No. 2360 (L. 17)])
- The Moorland (Livestock Extensification) (Amendment) Regulations 1999 (S.I. 1999 No. 2361)
- The University College London Hospitals National Health Service Trust (Establishment) Amendment Order 1999 (S.I. 1999 No. 2372)
- The Asbestos (Prohibitions) (Amendment) Regulations 1999 (S.I. 1999 No. 2373)
- Keith and Dufftown Light Railway Order 1999 (S.I. 1999 No. 2382)
- The Stamp Duty Reserve Tax (UK Depositary Interests in Foreign Securities) Regulations 1999 (S.I. 1999 No. 2383)
- The Films (Modification of the Definition of British Film) Order 1999 (S.I. 1999 No. 2386)
- The Education (School Performance Information) (England) (Amendment) (No. 2) Regulations 1999 (S.I. 1999 No. 2387)
- The Motor Vehicles (Third Party Risks) (Amendment) Regulations 1999 (S.I. 1999 No. 2392)
- The Isle of Wight (Electoral Changes) Order 1999 (S.I. 1999 No. 2393)
- The Magistrates' Courts Committees (Constitution) Regulations 1999 (S.I. 1999 No. 2395)
- The Justices of the Peace (Size and Chairmanship of Bench) (Amendment) Rules 1999 (S.I. 1999 No. 2396)
- The Justices' Chief Executives and Justices' Clerks (Appointment) Regulations 1999 (S.I. 1999 No. 2397)
- The Gosport Borough Council (Forton Lake Opening Bridge) Order 1999 (S.I. 1999 No. 2400)

== 2401–2500 ==
- The Housing Benefit (General) Amendment (No. 2) Regulations 1999 (S.I. 1999 No. 2401)
- The Transfer of Undertakings (Protection of Employment) (Amendment) Regulations 1999 (S.I. 1999 No. 2402)
- The Administration of the Rent Officer Service (England) Order 1999 (S.I. 1999 No. 2403)
- The Rail Vehicle Accessibility (South West Trains Class 458 Vehicles) Exemption Order 1999 (S.I. 1999 No. 2404)
- A1 Trunk Road (Barnet) Red Route (Speed Limit) Experimental Traffic Order 1999 Revocation Order 1999 (S.I. 1999 No. 2418)
- The Social Security Act 1998 (Commencement No. 9, and Savings and Consequential and Transitional Provisions) Order 1999 (S.I. 1999 No. 2422 (c. 61)])
- The Magistrates' Courts Committees (Greater Manchester) Amalgamation Order 1999 (S.I. 1999 No. 2426)
- The Goods Vehicle Operators (Qualifications)Regulations 1999 (S.I. 1999 No. 2430)
- The Public Service Vehicle Operators (Qualifications) Regulations 1999 (S.I. 1999 No. 2431)
- The Designation of Schools Having a Religious Character (England) Order 1999 (S.I. 1999 No. 2432)
- The Telecommunications (Licence Modification)(Standard Schedules) Regulations 1999 (S.I. 1999 No. 2450)
- The Telecommunications (Licence Modification) (Fixed Voice Telephony and International Facilities Operator Licences) Regulations 1999 (S.I. 1999 No. 2451)
- The Telecommunications (Licence Modification) (Mobile Public Telecommunication Operators) Regulations 1999 (S.I. 1999 No. 2452)
- The Telecommunications (Licence Modification) (British Telecommunications plc) Regulations 1999 (S.I. 1999 No. 2453)
- The Telecommunications (Licence Modification) (Cable and Local Delivery Operator Licences) Regulations 1999 (S.I. 1999 No. 2454)
- The Telecommunications (Licence Modification) (Kingston Communications (Hull) PLC) Regulations 1999 (S.I. 1999 No. 2455)
- The Education (Grammar School Designation) (Amendment) Order 1999 (S.I. 1999 No. 2456)
- The Spreadable Fats (Marketing Standards) (England) Regulations 1999 (S.I. 1999 No. 2457)
- The Civil Aviation (Canadian Navigation Services) (Second Amendment) Regulations 1999 (S.I. 1999 No. 2458)
- The Football Spectators (Designation of Enforcing Authority) Order 1999 (S.I. 1999 No. 2459)
- The Public Order (Domestic Football Banning) Order 1999 (S.I. 1999 No. 2460)
- The Football Spectators (Designation of Football Matches in England and Wales) Order 1999 (S.I. 1999 No. 2461)
- The Football (Offences) (Designation of Football Matches) Order 1999 (S.I. 1999 No. 2462)
- The Mines (Control of Ground Movement) Regulations 1999 (S.I. 1999 No. 2463)
- The Partnerships (Unrestricted Size) No. 13 Regulations 1999 (S.I. 1999 No. 2464)
- The Borough of Elmbridge (Electoral Changes) Order 1999 (S.I. 1999 No. 2465)
- The District of East Devon (Electoral Changes) Order 1999 (S.I. 1999 No. 2467)
- The City of Exeter (Electoral Changes) Order 1999 (S.I. 1999 No. 2468)
- The District of North Devon (Electoral Changes) Order 1999 (S.I. 1999 No. 2469)
- The District of Mid Devon (Electoral Changes) Order 1999 (S.I. 1999 No. 2470)
- The District of Teignbridge (Electoral Changes) Order 1999 (S.I. 1999 No. 2471)
- The District of Torridge (Electoral Changes) Order 1999 (S.I. 1999 No. 2472)
- The Borough of West Devon (Electoral Changes) Order 1999 (S.I. 1999 No. 2473)
- The Borough of Epsom and Ewell (Electoral Changes) Order 1999 (S.I. 1999 No. 2474)
- The Borough of Guildford (Electoral Changes) Order 1999 (S.I. 1999 No. 2475)
- The District of Mole Valley (Electoral Changes) Order 1999 (S.I. 1999 No. 2476)
- The Borough of Reigate and Banstead (Electoral Changes) Order 1999 (S.I. 1999 No. 2477)
- The Borough of Runnymede (Electoral Changes) Order 1999 (S.I. 1999 No. 2478)
- The Borough of Spelthorne (Electoral Changes) Order 1999 (S.I. 1999 No. 2479)
- The District of Tandridge (Electoral Changes) Order 1999 (S.I. 1999 No. 2480)
- The Borough of Surrey Heath (Electoral Changes) Order 1999 (S.I. 1999 No. 2481)
- The Borough of Waverley (Electoral Changes) Order 1999 (S.I. 1999 No. 2482)
- The Borough of Woking (Electoral Changes) Order 1999 (S.I. 1999 No. 2483)
- The School Standards and Framework Act 1998 (Amendment of Commencement Orders) (England) Order 1999 (S.I. 1999 No. 2484 (c. 62)])
- The Tax Credits Schemes (Miscellaneous Amendments) Regulations 1999 (S.I. 1999 No. 2487)
- The Tax Credits Schemes (Miscellaneous Amendments) (Northern Ireland) Regulations 1999 (S.I. 1999 No. 2488)
- The Gaming Duty (Amendment) Regulations 1999 (S.I. 1999 No. 2489)

== 2501–2600 ==
- The District of Chester-le-Street (Electoral Changes) Order 1999 (S.I. 1999 No. 2503)
- The Court of Protection (Amendment) Rules 1999 (S.I. 1999 No. 2504)
- The Court of Protection (Enduring Powers of Attorney) (Amendment) Rules 1999 (S.I. 1999 No. 2505)
- The Education (Special Educational Needs) (Information) (England) Regulations 1999 (S.I. 1999 No. 2506)
- The National Health Service (Travelling Expenses and Remission of Charges) Amendment Regulations 1999 (S.I. 1999 No. 2507)
- The Alteration of Boundaries of the River Lugg Internal Drainage District Order 1999 (S.I. 1999 No. 2508)
- The Employment Relations Act 1999 (Commencement No. 1 and Transitional Provisions) Order 1999 (S.I. 1999 No. 2509 (c. 63)])
- The Medicines (Sale or Supply) (Miscellaneous Provisions) Amendment (No. 2) Regulations 1999 (S.I. 1999 No. 2510)
- The Transfer of Undertakings (Protection of Employment) (Rent Officer Service) Regulations 1999 (S.I. 1999 No. 2511)
- The Medicines (Products for Animal Use—Fees) (Amendment) Regulations 1999 (S.I. 1999 No. 2512)
- The Portsmouth Mile End Quay (Continental Ferry Port) Harbour Revision Order 1999 (S.I. 1999 No. 2513)
- The Medicines (Products Other Than Veterinary Drugs) (General Sale List) Amendment (No. 2) Order 1999 (S.I. 1999 No. 2535)
- The Stamp Duty Reserve Tax (Amendment) Regulations 1999 (S.I. 1999 No. 2536)
- The Stamp Duty (Collection and Recovery of Penalties) Regulations 1999 (S.I. 1999 No. 2537)
- The Taxes (Interest Rate) (Amendment No. 3) Regulations 1999 (S.I. 1999 No. 2538)
- The Stamp Duty (Exempt Instruments) (Amendment) Regulations 1999 (S.I. 1999 No. 2539)
- The Health Act 1999 (Commencement No. 3) Order 1999 (S.I. 1999 No. 2540 (C. 64)])
- The Health Act 1999 (Fund-holding Practices) (Transfer of Assets, Savings, Rights and Liabilities and Transitional Provisions) Order 1999 (S.I. 1999 No. 2541)
- The Magistrates' Courts Committees (Sussex) Amalgamation Order 1999 (S.I. 1999 No. 2542)
- The Occupational Pension Schemes (Preservation of Benefit) Amendment Regulations 1999 (S.I. 1999 No. 2543)
- The Bilston Community College (Dissolution) Order 1999 (S.I. 1999 No. 2544)
- The Education (School Inspection) (England) (Amendment) (No. 2) Regulations 1999 (S.I. 1999 No. 2545)
- The Competition Act 1998 (Application for Designation of Professional Rules) Regulations 1999 (S.I. 1999 No. 2546)
- The Rail Vehicle Accessibility (ScotRail Class 170/4 Vehicles) Exemption Order 1999 (S.I. 1999 No. 2547)
- The County Court Fees (Amendment) Order 1999 (S.I. 1999 No. 2548 (L. 18)])
- The Family Proceedings Fees (Amendment) Order 1999 (S.I. 1999 No. 2549 (L. 19)])
- The Electrical Equipment for Explosive Atmospheres (Certification) (Amendment) Regulations 1999 (S.I. 1999 No. 2550)
- Income Support (General) Amendment Regulations 1999 (S.I. 1999 No. 2554)
- The Social Security Amendment (Personal Allowances for Children and Young Persons) Regulations 1999 (S.I. 1999 No. 2555)
- The Social Security (Miscellaneous Amendments) (No. 2) Regulations 1999 (S.I. 1999 No. 2556)
- The Merger Reference (Universal Foods Corporation and Pointing Holdings Limited) (Interim Provision) Order 1999 (S.I. 1999 No. 2560)
- The Welfare Food (Amendment) Regulations 1999 (S.I. 1999 No. 2561)
- The National Health Service (Optical Charges and Payments) and (General Ophthalmic Services) (Amendment) Regulations 1999 (S.I. 1999 No. 2562)
- The National Health Service (Pharmaceutical Services) Amendment (No. 2) Regulations 1999 (S.I. 1999 No. 2563)
- The Distress for Rent (Amendment) (No. 2) Rules 1999 (S.I. 1999 No. 2564 (L.20)])
- The Civil Legal Aid (General) (Amendment) (No. 2) Regulations 1999 (S.I. 1999 No. 2565)
- The Social Security and Child Support (Tax Credits) Consequential Amendments Regulations 1999 (S.I. 1999 No. 2566)
- The Merchant Shipping (Accident Reporting and Investigation) Regulations 1999 (S.I. 1999 No. 2567)
- The Housing Renewal Grants (Amendment) (England) Regulations 1999 (S.I. 1999 No. 2568)
- The Supreme Court Fees (Amendment) Order 1999 (S.I. 1999 No. 2569 (L. 21)])
- The Tax Credits (Decisions and Appeals) (Amendment) Regulations 1999 (S.I. 1999 No. 2570)
- The Tax Credits (Payments on Account, Overpayments and Recovery) (Amendment) Regulations 1999 (S.I. 1999 No. 2571)
- The Tax Credits (Claims and Payments) (Amendment) Regulations 1999 (S.I. 1999 No. 2572)
- The Tax Credits (Payments on Account, Overpayments and Recovery) (Northern Ireland) (Amendment) Regulations 1999 (S.I. 1999 No. 2573)
- The Tax Credits (Claims and Payments) (Northern Ireland) (Amendment) Regulations 1999 (S.I. 1999 No. 2574)
- The Legal Advice and Assistance (Amendment) (No. 3) Regulations 1999 (S.I. 1999 No. 2575)
- The Legal Aid (Mediation in Family Matters) (Amendment) Regulations 1999 (S.I. 1999 No. 2576)
- The Legal Aid in Criminal and Care Proceedings (General) (Amendment) (No. 4) Regulations 1999 (S.I. 1999 No. 2577)
- The Education (Further Education Institutions Information) (England) (Amendment) Regulations 1999 (S.I. 1999 No. 2578)
- The City of Durham (Electoral Changes) Order 1999 (S.I. 1999 No. 2579)
- The District of Derwentside (Electoral Changes) Order 1999 (S.I. 1999 No. 2580)
- The District of Easington (Electoral Changes) Order 1999 (S.I. 1999 No. 2581)
- The Borough of Sedgefield (Electoral Changes) Order 1999 (S.I. 1999 No. 2582)
- The District of Teesdale (Electoral Changes) Order 1999 (S.I. 1999 No. 2583)
- The District of Wear Valley (Electoral Changes) Order 1999 (S.I. 1999 No. 2584)
- The Financial Services Act 1986 (Gas Industry Exemption) Order 1999 (S.I. 1999 No. 2586)
- The Pur Fleet (King's Lynn) Order 1999 (S.I. 1999 No. 2587)
- The Tax Credits (Decisions and Appeals) (Northern Ireland) (Amendment) Regulations 1999 (S.I. 1999 No. 2588)
- The Health and Safety (Fees) (Amendment) Regulations 1999 (S.I. 1999 No. 2597)

== 2601–2700 ==
- The Export of Goods (Control) (Amendment No. 4) Order 1999 (S.I. 1999 No. 2609)
- Export of Goods (Licences for Exports to Indonesia) (Variation) Order 1999 (S.I. 1999 No. 2610)
- The Organic Farming (Wales) Regulations 1999 (S.I. 1999 No. 2611)
- The Housing Renewal Grants (Prescribed Form and Particulars) (Amendment) (England) Regulations 1999 (S.I. 1999 No. 2624)
- The Relocation Grants (Form of Application) (Amendment) (England) Regulations 1999 (S.I. 1999 No. 2625)
- The Export of Goods (Control) (Amendment No. 5) Order 1999 (S.I. 1999 No. 2627)
- The Broadcasting (Unlicensed Television Services) Exemption (Revocation) Order 1999 (S.I. 1999 No. 2628)
- The Rates and Precepts (Final Adjustments) (Amendment) (England) Order 1999 (S.I. 1999 No. 2629)
- The A406 North Circular Road (Barnet) (50 mph Speed Limit) Order 1999 (S.I. 1999 No. 2634)
- The A10 Trunk Road (Haringey) Red Route Experimental Traffic Order 1999 (S.I. 1999 No. 2635)
- The Friendly Societies (Modification of the Corporation Tax Acts) (Amendment) Regulations 1999 (S.I. 1999 No. 2636)
- The Taxes (Interest Rate) (Amendment No. 4) Regulations 1999 (S.I. 1999 No. 2637)
- The Disability Discrimination Code of Practice (Trade Organisations) Order 1999 (S.I. 1999 No. 2638)
- The Gas Act 1986 (Exemptions) Order 1999 (S.I. 1999 No. 2639)
- The Social Security Amendment (Notional Income and Capital) Regulations 1999 (S.I. 1999 No. 2640)
- The Plant Health (Amendment) (Wales) Order 1999 (S.I. 1999 No. 2641 (W.8))
- Gorchymyn Iechyd Planhigion (Diwygio) (Cymru) 1999 (S.I. 1999 No. 2641 (Cy.8))
- The Scunthorpe Community Health Care National Health Service Trust (Dissolution) Order 1999 (S.I. 1999 No. 2655)
- The Doncaster Healthcare National Health Service Trust Change of Name and (Establishment) Amendment Order 1999 (S.I. 1999 No. 2656)
- The Access to Justice Act 1999 (Commencement No. 1) Order 1999 (S.I. 1999 No. 2657 (C. 65)])
- The New School (Admissions) (England) Regulations 1999 (S.I. 1999 No. 2666)
- The East Yorkshire Hospitals and the Royal Hull Hospitals National Health Service Trusts (Dissolution) Order 1999 (S.I. 1999 No. 2674)
- The Hull and East Yorkshire Hospitals National Health Service Trust (Establishment) Order 1999 (S.I. 1999 No. 2675)
- The Social Security and Child Support (Decisions and Appeals), Vaccine Damage Payments and Jobseeker's Allowance (Amendment) Regulations 1999 (S.I. 1999 No. 2677)
- The Companies (Forms) (Amendment) (No. 2) Regulations 1999 (S.I. 1999 No. 2678)
- The Companies (Welsh Language Forms) (Amendment) (No. 2) Regulations 1999 (S.I. 1999 No. 2679)
- The East Yorkshire Community Healthcare and the Hull and Holderness Community Health National Health Service Trusts (Dissolution) Order 1999 (S.I. 1999 No. 2687)
- The Hull and East Riding Community Health National Health Service Trust (Establishment) Order 1999 (S.I. 1999 No. 2688)
- The Access to Justice Act 1999 (Transitional Provisions and Savings) Order 1999 (S.I. 1999 No. 2689)
- The Borough of Amber Valley (Electoral Changes) Order 1999 (S.I. 1999 No. 2690)
- The District of Bolsover (Electoral Changes) Order 1999 (S.I. 1999 No. 2691)
- The Borough of Chesterfield (Electoral Changes) Order 1999 (S.I. 1999 No. 2692)
- The District of Derbyshire Dales (Electoral Changes) Order 1999 (S.I. 1999 No. 2693)
- The Borough of Erewash (Electoral Changes) Order 1999 (S.I. 1999 No. 2694)
- The Borough of High Peak (Electoral Changes) Order 1999 (S.I. 1999 No. 2695)
- The District of North East Derbyshire (Electoral Changes) Order 1999 (S.I. 1999 No. 2696)
- The District of South Derbyshire (Electoral Changes) Order 1999 (S.I. 1999 No. 2697)
- The Seeds (Fees) (Amendment) (England) Regulations 1999 (S.I. 1999 No. 2698)
- The A1 Trunk Road (Haringey) Red Route (Prohibited Turn) Experimental Traffic Order 1999 (S.I. 1999 No. 2700)

== 2701–2800 ==
- The A205 Trunk Road (Lewisham) Red Route (Prohibited Turns) (No. 3) Traffic Order 1999 (S.I. 1999 No. 2701)
- The National Health Service (General Ophthalmic Services) (Amendment) Regulations 1999 (S.I. 1999 No. 2714)
- The Neath to Abergavenny Trunk Road (A465) (Abergavenny to Hirwaun Dualling and Slip Roads) and East of Abercynon to East of Dowlais Road (A4060), Cardiff to Glan Conwy Trunk Road (A470) (Connecting Roads) Order 1999 (S.I. 1999 No.2720 (W.9)])
- Gorchymyn Cefnffordd Castell-Nedd — Y Fenni (A465) (Deuoli o'r Fenni i Hirwaun a'r Ffyrdd Ymuno ac Ymadael) a Ffordd Man i'r Dwyrain o Abercynon — Man i'r Dwyrain o Ddowlais (A4060), Cefnffordd Caerdydd — Glanconwy (A470) (Ffyrdd Cysylltu) 1999 (([http://www.legislation.gov.uk/wsi/1999/2720/contents/made/welsh S.I. 1999 Rhif 2720 (Cy.9))
- The Merchant Shipping (Life-Saving Appliances For Ships Other Than Ships Of Classes III To VI(A)) Regulations 1999 (S.I. 1999 No. 2721)
- The Merchant Shipping (Musters, Training and Decision Support Systems) Regulations 1999 (S.I. 1999 No. 2722)
- The Merchant Shipping (Life-Saving Appliances For Passenger Ships Of Classes III To VI(A)) Regulations 1999 (S.I. 1999 No. 2723)
- The M60 Motorway (Improvement Between Junctions 5 and 8) Connecting Roads Scheme 1999 (S.I. 1999 No. 2724)
- The Consumer Credit (Content of Quotations) and Consumer Credit (Advertisements) (Amendment) Regulations 1999 (S.I. 1999 No. 2725)
- The Plant Health (Amendment) (England) (No. 2) Order 1999 (S.I. 1999 No. 2726)
- The Changing of School Session Times (England) Regulations 1999 (S.I. 1999 No. 2733)
- The Housing Benefit (General) Amendment (No. 3) Regulations 1999 (S.I. 1999 No. 2734)
- The Organic Farming (Amendment) Regulations 1999 (S.I. 1999 No. 2735)
- The Social Security (Contributions) (Amendment No. 5) Regulations 1999 (S.I. 1999 No. 2736)
- The Legal Aid in Criminal and Care Proceedings (General) (Amendment) (No. 5) Regulations 1999 (S.I. 1999 No. 2737)
- The Legal Aid (Mediation in Family Matters) (Amendment) (No. 2) Regulations 1999 (S.I. 1999 No. 2738)
- The Social Security Act 1998 (Commencement No. 10 and Transitional Provisions) Order 1999 (S.I. 1999 No. 2739 (C.67)])
- The Prosecution of Offences (Youth Courts Time Limits) Regulations 1999 (S.I. 1999 No. 2743)
- The Prosecution of Offences (Custody Time Limits) (Amendment) Regulations 1999 (S.I. 1999 No. 2744)
- The A1 Trunk Road (Islington) Red Route Traffic Order 1993 Variation (No. 3) Order 1999 (S.I. 1999 No. 2745)
- The Army Terms of Service (Amendment) (No. 2) Regulations 1999 (S.I. 1999 No. 2764)
- The Magistrates' Courts (Miscellaneous Amendments) Rules 1999 (S.I. 1999 No. 2765)
- The Home Repair Assistance (Extension) (England) Regulations 1999 (S.I. 1999 No. 2766)
- The Funding Agency for Schools Dissolution Order 1999 (S.I. 1999 No. 2767)
- The Children (Protection from Offenders) (Amendment) Regulations 1999 (S.I. 1999 No. 2768)
- The Finance Act 1999, section 20, (Appointed Day) Order 1999 (S.I. 1999 No. 2769 (C. 68)])
- The Companies (Investment Companies) (Distribution of Profits) Regulations 1999 (S.I. 1999 No. 2770)
- The National Savings Stock Register (Amendment) Regulations 1999 (S.I. 1999 No. 2771)
- The Social Fund Cold Weather Payments (General) Amendment Regulations 1999 (S.I. 1999 No. 2781)
- The Borough of Sefton (Electoral Changes) Order 1999 (S.I. 1999 No. 2782)
- The Justices' Clerks Rules 1999 (S.I. 1999 No. 2784 (L. 22)])
- The Transfer of Functions (Scientific Research) Order 1999 (S.I. 1999 No. 2785)
- The Transfer of Functions (Nuclear Installations) Order 1999 (S.I. 1999 No. 2786)
- The National Assembly for Wales (Transfer of Functions) (No.2) Order 1999 (S.I. 1999 No. 2787)
- The European Communities (Designation) (No. 3)Order 1999 (S.I. 1999 No. 2788)
- The Criminal Evidence (Northern Ireland) Order 1999 (S.I. 1999 No. 2789 (N.I. 8)])
- The Employment Relations (Northern Ireland) Order 1999 (S.I. 1999 No. 2790 (N.I. 9)])
- The Health Act 1999 (Commencement No. 5) Order 1999 (S.I. 1999 No. 2793 (C. 69)])
- The National Health Service (Penalty Charge) Regulations 1999 (S.I. 1999 No. 2794)
- The Health Act 1999 (Supplementary and Consequential Provisions) Order 1999 (S.I. 1999 No. 2795)
- The Food (Animals and Animal Products from Belgium) (Emergency Control) (England and Wales) (No. 3) Order 1999 (S.I. 1999 No. 2798)
- The Animal Feedingstuffs from Belgium (Control) (England and Wales) (No. 3) Regulations 1999 (S.I. 1999 No. 2799)
- The New Schools (Admissions) (Wales) Regulations 1999 (S.I. 1999 No. 2800 (W. 14))
- Rheoliadau Ysgolion Newydd (Derbyniadau) (Cymru) 1999 (S.I. 1999 Rhif 2800 (Cy. 14))

== 2801–2900 ==
- The Commission for Health Improvement (Membership and Procedure) Regulations 1999 (S.I. 1999 No. 2801)
- The Education (School Meals Staff) (Wales) Regulations 1999 (S.I. 1999 No. 2802 (W.15))
- Rheoliadau Addysg (Staff Prydau Bwyd Ysgolion) (Cymru) 1999 (S.I. 1999 Rhif 2802 (Cy.15))
- The A3 Trunk Road (Kingston upon Thames) Red Route Traffic Order 1996 Variation Order 1999 (S.I. 1999 No. 2803)
- The A12 Trunk Road (Redbridge, Waltham Forest, Hackney and Tower Hamlets) Red Route (Clearway) Traffic Order 1999 (S.I. 1999 No. 2804)
- The A12 Trunk Road (Redbridge) Red Route Traffic Order 1999 (S.I. 1999 No. 2805)
- The A1 Trunk Road (Haringey) Red Route Traffic Order 1993 Variation (No. 2) Order 1999 (S.I. 1999 No. 2806)
- The A3 Trunk Road (Kingston upon Thames) Red Route (Clearway) Traffic Order 1996 Variation Order 1999 (S.I. 1999 No. 2807)
- The Justices' Clerks (Qualifications of Assistants) (Amendment) Rules 1999 (S.I. 1999 No. 2814 (L.23)])
- The Local Government Act 1999 (Commencement) (Wales) Order 1999 (S.I. 1999 No. 2815 (C.70) (W.16))
- Gorchymyn Deddf Llywodraeth Leol 1999 (Cymru) (Cychwyn) 1999 (S.I. 1999 Rhif 2815 (C.70) (Cy.16))
- The Education (Mathematics and Science Teacher Training Incentive) (Wales) Regulations 1999 (S.I. 1999 No. 2816 (W.17))
- Rheoliadau Addysg (Cymhelliant Hyfforddi Athrawon Mathemateg a Gwyddoniaeth) (Cymru) 1999 (S.I. 1999 Rhif 2816 (Cy.17))
- The Education (Teachers' Qualifications and Health Standards) (Wales) Regulations 1999 (S.I. 1999 No. 2817 (W.18))
- Rheoliadau Addysg (Cymwysterau a Safonau Iechyd Athrawon) (Cymru) 1999 (S.I. 1999 Rhif 2817 (Cy.18))
- The Federal Republic of Yugoslavia (Supply, Sale and Export of Petroleum and Petroleum Products) (Penalties and Licences) (No. 3) Regulations 1999 (S.I. 1999 No. 2821)
- The Indonesia (Supply, Sale, Export and Shipment of Equipment) (Penalties and Licences) Regulations 1999 (S.I. 1999 No. 2822)
- The Employment Relations Act 1999 (Commencement No. 2 and Transitional and Saving Provisions) Order 1999 (S.I. 1999 No. 2830 (C. 72)])
- The Value Added Tax (Special Provisions) (Amendment) Order 1999 (S.I. 1999 No. 2831)
- The Value Added Tax (Cars) (Amendment) Order 1999 (S.I. 1999 No. 2832)
- The Value Added Tax (Supplies of Goods where Input Tax cannot be recovered) Order 1999 (S.I. 1999 No. 2833)
- The Value Added Tax (Subscriptions to Trade Unions, Professional and Other Public Interest Bodies) Order 1999 (S.I. 1999 No. 2834)
- The Crown Court (Amendment) Rules 1999 (S.I. 1999 No. 2838 (L.24)])
- The Insurance Companies (Overseas Life Assurance Business) (Compliance) (Amendment) Regulations 1999 (S.I. 1999 No. 2839)
- The National Health Service (Travelling Expenses and Remission of Charges) Amendment (Wales) Regulations 1999 (S.I. 1999 No. 2840 (W.20))
- Rheoliadau'r Gwasanaeth Iechyd Gwladol (Costau Teithio a Dileu Taliadau) (Diwygio) (Cymru) 1999 (S.I. 1999 Rhif 2840 (Cy.20))
- The National Health Service (Optical Charges and Payments) and (General Ophthalmic Services) Amendment (Wales) Regulations 1999 (S.I. 1999 No. 2841 (W.21))
- Rheoliadau'r Gwasanaeth Iechyd Gwladol (Ffioedd a Thaliadau Optegol) a (Gwasanaethau Offthalmig Cyffredinol) Diwygio (Cymru) 1999 (S.I. 1999 Rhif 2841 (Cy.21))
- The Major Precepting Authorities (Excessive Budget Requirements—Payments) (England) Regulations 1999 (S.I. 1999 No. 2842)
- The Veterinary Surgeons and Veterinary Practitioners (Registration) Regulations Order of Council 1999 (S.I. 1999 No. 2846)
- The Competition Act 1998 (Commencement No. 4) Order 1999 (S.I. 1999 No. 2859 (C.74)])
- The Social Security Act 1998 (Commencement No. 11, and Savings and Consequential and Transitional Provisions) Order 1999 (S.I. 1999 No. 2860 (C.75)])
- The Education (Student Fees) (Exceptions) (Wales) Regulations 1999 (S.I. 1999 No. 2862 (W. 22))
- Rheoliadau Addysg (Ffioedd Myfyrwyr) (Eithriadau) (Cymru) 1999 (S.I. 1999 Rhif 2862 (Cy. 22))
- The Postal Privilege (Suspension) Order 1999 (Revocation) Order 1999 (S.I. 1999 No. 2863)
- The Motor Vehicles (Driving Licences) Regulations 1999 (S.I. 1999 No. 2864)
- The Public Telecommunication System Designation (GC Pan European Crossing UK Limited) Order 1999 (S.I. 1999 No. 2865)
- The Public Telecommunication System Designation (Farland Services UK Limited) Order 1999 (S.I. 1999 No. 2866)
- The Public Telecommunication System Designation (MTU Inform Europe Limited) Order 1999 (S.I. 1999 No. 2867)
- The Public Telecommunication System Designation (Kingston Communications (Hull) PLC) Order 1999 (S.I. 1999 No. 2868)
- The Public Telecommunication System Designation (Tele2 Communications Services Limited) Order 1999 (S.I. 1999 No. 2869)
- The Public Telecommunication System Designation (USA Global Link (UK) Limited) Order 1999 (S.I. 1999 No. 2870)
- The Public Telecommunication System Designation (ICO Services Limited) Order 1999 (S.I. 1999 No. 2871)
- The Public Telecommunication System Designation (Carrier One Ltd) Order 1999 (S.I. 1999 No. 2872)
- The Public Telecommunication System Designation (Swisscom (UK) Limited) Order 1999 (S.I. 1999 No. 2873)
- The Public Telecommunication System Designation (Telia UK Ltd) Order 1999 (S.I. 1999 No. 2874)
- The Public Telecommunication System Designation (PLDncompass Limited) Order 1999 (S.I. 1999 No. 2875)
- The Public Telecommunication System Designation (IFC Global (UK) Ltd) Order 1999 (S.I. 1999 No. 2876)
- The Prevention of Terrorism (Temporary Provisions) Act 1989 (Designated Ports) Order 1999 (S.I. 1999 No. 2877)
- The Education (Islamia Primary School, Brent) (Exemption from Pay and Conditions) Order 1999 (S.I. 1999 No. 2879)
- The Carriage by Air (Sterling Equivalents) Order 1999 (S.I. 1999 No. 2881)
- The Education (School Teacher Appraisal) (Wales) Regulations 1999 (S.I. 1999 No. 2888 (W. 25))
- Rheoliadau Addysg (Gwerthuso Athrawon Ysgol) (Cymru) 1999 (S.I. 1999 Rhif 2888 (Cy. 25))
- The Medicines (Aristolochia) (Temporary Prohibition) Order 1999 (S.I. 1999 No. 2889)
- The Local Government Residuary Body (England) (Winding Up) Order 1999 (S.I. 1999 No. 2890)
- Nuclear Reactors (Environmental Impact Assessment for Decommissioning) Regulations 1999 (S.I. 1999 No. 2892)
- The Education (School Admission Appeals: The National Assembly for Wales Code of Practice) (Appointed Day) Order 1999 (S.I. 1999 No. 2893 (W.26))
- Gorchymyn Addysg (Apelau Derbyniadau Ysgol: Cod Ymarfer Cynulliad Cenedlaethol Cymru) (Diwrnod Penodedig) 1999 (S.I. 1999 Rhif 2893 (Cy.26))
- The General Optical Council (Testing of Sight by Persons Training as Ophthalmic Opticians Rules) (Amendment) Order of Council 1999 (S.I. 1999 No. 2897)

== 2901–3000 ==
- The Legal Services Ombudsman (Jurisdiction) (Amendment) Order 1999 (S.I. 1999 No. 2905)
- The Community Health Councils (Amendment) Regulations 1999 (S.I. 1999 No. 2906)
- The Treasury Bills (Amendment) Regulations 1999 (S.I. 1999 No. 2907)
- The Finance Act 1998, Section 159 (Appointed Day) and Schedule 26 (Commencement Etc.) Order 1999 (S.I. 1999 No. 2908 (C. 76)])
- The Cornwall Healthcare National Health Service Trust (Transfer of Trust Property) Order 1999 (S.I. 1999 No. 2909)
- The Bath and West Community National Health Service Trust (Transfer of Trust Property) Order 1999 (S.I. 1999 No. 2918)
- The Housing (Right to Buy) (Priority of Charges) (England) Order 1999 (S.I. 1999 No. 2919)
- The Motor Cycles Etc. (EC Type Approval) Regulations 1999 (S.I. 1999 No. 2920)
- The University Hospitals of Leicester National Health Service Trust (Establishment) Order 1999 (S.I. 1999 No. 2921)
- The District of Kennet (Electoral Changes) Order 1999 (S.I. 1999 No. 2922)
- The District of North Wiltshire (Electoral Changes) Order 1999 (S.I. 1999 No. 2923)
- The District of Salisbury (Electoral Changes) Order 1999 (S.I. 1999 No. 2924)
- The Excise Duty (Amendment of the Isle of Man Act 1979) Order 1999 (S.I. 1999 No. 2925)
- The District of West Wiltshire (Electoral Changes) Order 1999 (S.I. 1999 No. 2926)
- The Borough of Swindon (Electoral Changes) Order 1999 (S.I. 1999 No. 2927)
- The Value Added Tax (Input Tax) (Amendment) Order 1999 (S.I. 1999 No. 2930)
- The Rail Vehicle Accessibility (Serco Metrolink T68A Vehicles) Exemption Order 1999 (S.I. 1999 No. 2932)
- The Organic Farming (Amendment) (No. 2) Regulations 1999 (S.I. 1999 No. 2933)
- The Wireless Telegraphy (Cordless Telephone Apparatus) (Restriction and Marking) Order 1999 (S.I. 1999 No. 2934)
- The Local Authorities (Calculation of Council Tax Base) (Wales) (Amendment) Regulations 1999 (S.I. 1999 No. 2935 (W.27))
- Rheoliadau Awdurdodau Lleol (Cyfrifo Sylfaen Treth Gyngor) (Cymru) (Diwygio) 1999 (S.I. 1999 Rhif 2935 (Cy.27))
- The Northern Ireland Act 1998 (Commencement No. 4) Order 1999 (S.I. 1999 No. 2936 (C. 78)])
- The Education (Amendment of School and Pupil Information Regulations) (England) Regulations 1999 (S.I. 1999 No. 2937)
- The Public Telecommunication System Designation (Core Telecommunications Limited) Order 1999 (S.I. 1999 No. 2938)
- The Public Telecommunication System Designation (WinStar Communications Limited) Order 1999 (S.I. 1999 No. 2939)
- The Public Telecommunication System Designation (TNI (Telecom) Limited) Order 1999 (S.I. 1999 No. 2940)
- The Public Telecommunication System Designation (IBSC Limited) Order 1999 (S.I. 1999 No. 2941)
- The Public Telecommunication System Designation (Tele2 Sweden Limited) Order 1999 (S.I. 1999 No. 2942)
- The Public Telecommunication System Designation (Faultbasic Limited) Order 1999 (S.I. 1999 No. 2943)
- The Public Telecommunication System Designation (GTS Business Services (UK) Limited) Order 1999 (S.I. 1999 No. 2944)
- The Public Telecommunication System Designation (WXNET Limited) Order 1999 (S.I. 1999 No. 2945)
- The Public Telecommunication System Designation (Enitel ASA) Order 1999 (S.I. 1999 No. 2946)
- The Public Telecommunication System Designation (G.C. Global Communications Limited) Order 1999 (S.I. 1999 No. 2947)
- The Public Telecommunication System Designation (Level 3 Communications Limited) Order 1999 (S.I. 1999 No. 2948)
- The Public Telecommunication System Designation (Pantheon Telecom (UK) Limited) Order 1999 (S.I. 1999 No. 2949)
- The Public Telecommunication System Designation (BSI ACCESS UK Limited) Order 1999 (S.I. 1999 No. 2950)
- The Public Telecommunication System Designation (StarGlobal Ltd) Order 1999 (S.I. 1999 No. 2951)
- The Public Telecommunication System Designation (Telecom New Zealand (UK) Licences Limited) Order 1999 (S.I. 1999 No. 2952)
- The Public Telecommunication System Designation (CompleTel UK Limited) Order 1999 (S.I. 1999 No. 2953)
- The Public Telecommunication System Designation (Teleport UK Limited (trading as Satellite Media Services)) Order 1999 (S.I. 1999 No. 2954)
- The Northern Birmingham Mental Health National Health Service Trust (Establishment) Amendment Order 1999 (S.I. 1999 No. 2955)
- The Corporation Tax (Simplified Arrangements for Group Relief) Regulations 1999 (S.I. 1999 No. 2975)
- The Crime and Disorder Act 1998 (Commencement No. 5) Order 1999 (S.I. 1999 No. 2976 (C. 79)])
- The Asbestos (Prohibitions) (Amendment) (No. 2) Regulations 1999 (S.I. 1999 No. 2977)
- The Road Vehicles (Brake Linings Safety) Regulations 1999 (S.I. 1999 No. 2978)
- The Financial Markets and Insolvency (Settlement Finality) Regulations 1999 (S.I. 1999 No. 2979)
- The Devon (Coroners' Districts) Order 1999 (S.I. 1999 No. 2980)
- The River Thames (Hungerford Footbridges) Order 1999 (S.I. 1999 No. 2981)
- The Fishing Vessels (EC Directive on Harmonised Safety Regime) Regulations 1999 (S.I. 1999 No. 2998)
- The Financial Services Act 1986 (Restriction of Exemption) Order 1999 (S.I. 1999 No. 2999)
- The Insurance Brokers (Registration) Act 1977 (Amendment) Order 1999 (S.I. 1999 No. 3000)

== 3001–3100 ==
- The A406 Trunk Road (Hanger Lane, Ealing) (Prohibition of U-Turn) Order 1999 (S.I. 1999 No. 3002)
- The Magistrates' Courts Committee Areas Order 1999 (S.I. 1999 No. 3008)
- The Petty Sessions Areas Order 1999 (S.I. 1999 No. 3009)
- The Justices of the Peace (Commission Areas) Order 1999 (S.I. 1999 No. 3010)
- The Road Traffic (NHS Charges) (Appeals: Ending of Transitional Period) Order 1999 (S.I. 1999 No. 3012)
- The Wednesbury Education Action Zone Order 1999 (S.I. 1999 No. 3013)
- The Wythenshawe Education Action Zone Order 1999 (S.I. 1999 No. 3014)
- The East Manchester Education Action Zone Order 1999 (S.I. 1999 No. 3015)
- The Dudley Partnership for Achievement Education Action Zone Order 1999 (S.I. 1999 No. 3016)
- The Telford and Wrekin Education Action Zone Order 1999 (S.I. 1999 No. 3017)
- The Heart of Slough Education Action Zone Order 1999 (S.I. 1999 No. 3018)
- The Southend Education Action Zone Order 1999 (S.I. 1999 No. 3019)
- The Hastings and St Leonards Education Action Zone Order 1999 (S.I. 1999 No. 3020)
- The Preston Education Action Zone Order 1999 (S.I. 1999 No. 3021)
- The North East Derbyshire Coalfields Education Action Zone Order 1999 (S.I. 1999 No. 3022)
- The New Horizons Kent–Somerset Virtual Education Action Zone Order 1999 (S.I. 1999 No. 3023)
- The Widening Horizons—North Islington Education Action Zone Order 1999 (S.I. 1999 No. 3024)
- The Hackney Education Action Zone Order 1999 (S.I. 1999 No. 3025)
- The Gas Act 1986 (Exemptions) (No. 4) (Amendment) Order 1999 (S.I. 1999 No. 3026)
- The Competition Act 1998 (Commission Investigation and Director's Investigation) Order 1999 (S.I. 1999 No. 3027)
- The Housing (Right to Acquire) (Discount) (Amendment) Order 1999 (S.I. 1999 No. 3028)
- The Value Added Tax Regulations 1999 (S.I. 1999 No. 3029)
- The Insurance Brokers Registration Council Election Scheme Approval Order 1999 (S.I. 1999 No. 3030)
- The Building Societies (Members' Requisitions) Order 1999 (S.I. 1999 No. 3031)
- The Building Societies (Nominations for Directors' Election) Order 1999 (S.I. 1999 No. 3032)
- The Building Societies (Members' Resolutions) Order 1999 (S.I. 1999 No. 3033)
- The Glenfield Hospital, the Leicester General Hospital and the Leicester Royal Infirmary National Health Service Trusts (Dissolution) Order 1999 (S.I. 1999 No. 3036)
- The Income Tax (Indexation) (No. 2) Order 1999 (S.I. 1999 No. 3038)
- The Magistrates' Courts (Forms) (Amendment No. 2) Rules 1999 (S.I. 1999 No. 3039 (L. 25)])
- The Crown Court (Forms Amendment) Rules 1999 (S.I. 1999 No. 3040 (L.26)])
- The Price Marking Order 1999 (S.I. 1999 No. 3042)
- The Portland Harbour Fishery (Variation) Order 1999 (S.I. 1999 No. 3049)
- The Avalon, Somerset, National Health Service Trust (Change of Name) Order 1999 (S.I. 1999 No. 3050)
- The A13 Trunk Road (Tower Hamlets) Red Route (Bus Priority) Traffic Order 1999 (S.I. 1999 No. 3051)
- The Conservation of Seals (England) Order 1999 (S.I. 1999 No. 3052)
- The Asylum Support (Interim Provisions) Regulations 1999 (S.I. 1999 No. 3056)
- The Housing Accommodation (Persons subject to Immigration Control) (Amendment) (England) Order 1999 (S.I. 1999 No. 3057)
- The Occupational Pension Schemes (Contracting-out) (Amount Required for Restoring State Scheme Rights) Amendment Regulations 1999 (S.I. 1999 No. 3069)
- The Water and Sewerage Undertakers (Pipelaying and Other Works) (Code of Practice) Order 1999 (S.I. 1999 No. 3070)
- The General Chiropractic Council (Professional Indemnity Insurance) Rules Order 1999 (S.I. 1999 No. 3071)
- The Jobseeker's Allowance Amendment (New Deal) Regulations 1999 (S.I. 1999 No. 3083)
- The Home Repair Assistance (Extension) (Wales) Regulations 1999 (S.I. 1999 No. 3084 (W.35))
- Rheoliadau Cymorth Trwsio Cartref (Estyn)(Cymru) 1999 (S.I. 1999 Rhif 3084 (Cy.35))
- The Financial Services Act 1986 (Exemption) Order 1999 (S.I. 1999 No. 3085)
- The Immigration (Transit Visa) (Amendment) Order 1999 (S.I. 1999 No. 3086)
- The Jobseeker's Allowance (Amendment) (No. 2) Regulations 1999 (S.I. 1999 No. 3087)
- The Water Appointment (Competition Commission) Regulations 1999 (S.I. 1999 No. 3088)
- The Gas Act 1986 (Exemptions) (No. 2) Order 1999 (S.I. 1999 No. 3089)
- The Crime (Sentences) Act 1997 (Commencement No. 3) Order 1999 (S.I. 1999 No. 3096 (C. 80)])
- The A13 Trunk Road (A112 Prince Regent Lane Junction Improvement, Trunk Road and Slip Roads) Order 1999 (S.I. 1999 No. 3097)
- The Legal Aid in Civil Proceedings (Remuneration) (Amendment) Regulations 1999 (S.I. 1999 No. 3098)
- The Greater London Magistrates' Courts Authority (Constitution) Regulations 1999 (S.I. 1999 No. 3099)

== 3101–3200 ==
- The A3 Trunk Road (Wandsworth) Red Route Experimental Traffic Order 1999 (S.I. 1999 No. 3103)
- The Good Laboratory Practice Regulations 1999 (S.I. 1999 No. 3106)
- The Motor Fuel (Composition and Content) Regulations 1999 (S.I. 1999 No. 3107)
- The Social Security (Claims and Information) Regulations 1999 (S.I. 1999 No. 3108)
- The Social Security (Incapacity for Work) Miscellaneous Amendments Regulations 1999 (S.I. 1999 No. 3109)
- The Tax Credit (New Category of Child Care Provider) Regulations 1999 (S.I. 1999 No. 3110)
- Docklands Light Railway (Miscellaneous Closure Exemptions) Order 1999 (S.I. 1999 No. 3111)
- Docklands Light Railway (Lewisham Extension) (Exemptions) Order 1999 (S.I. 1999 No. 3112)
- The Railways (Alternative Closure Procedure) (Amendment) Order 1999 (S.I. 1999 No. 3113)
- The Value Added Tax (Amendment) (No. 4) Regulations 1999 (S.I. 1999 No. 3114)
- The Value Added Tax (Importation of Investment Gold) Relief Order 1999 (S.I. 1999 No. 3115)
- The Value Added Tax (Investment Gold) Order 1999 (S.I. 1999 No. 3116)
- The Value Added Tax (Terminal Markets) Order 1999 (S.I. 1999 No. 3117)
- The Value Added Tax (Input Tax) (Amendment) (No. 2) Order 1999 (S.I. 1999 No. 3118)
- The Value Added Tax (Treatment of Transactions) (Amendment) Order 1999 (S.I. 1999 No. 3119)
- The Value Added Tax (Special Provisions) (Amendment) (No. 2) Order 1999 (S.I. 1999 No. 3120)
- The Value Added Tax (Input Tax) (Specified Supplies) Order 1999 (S.I. 1999 No. 3121)
- The Free Zone (Liverpool) Designation (Variation) Order 1999 (S.I. 1999 No. 3122)
- The Local Authorities (Calculation of Council Tax Base) (Amendment) (England) Regulations 1999 (S.I. 1999 No. 3123)
- The Homelessness (Asylum-Seekers) (Interim Period) (England) Order 1999 (S.I. 1999 No. 3126)
- The Courses for Drink-Drive Offenders (Experimental Period) (Termination of Restrictions) Order 1999 (S.I. 1999 No. 3130)
- The European Convention on Cinematographic Co-production (Amendment) Order 1999 (S.I. 1999 No. 3131)
- The Consular Fees (No. 2) Order 1999 (S.I. 1999 No. 3132)
- The Afghanistan (United Nations Sanctions) Order 1999 (S.I. 1999 No. 3133)
- The Afghanistan (United Nations Sanctions) (Channel Islands) Order 1999 (S.I. 1999 No. 3134)
- The Afghanistan (United Nations Sanctions) (Isle of Man) Order 1999 (S.I. 1999 No. 3135)
- The Afghanistan (United Nations Sanctions) (Overseas Territories) Order 1999 (S.I. 1999 No. 3136)
- The Chartered Institute of Patent Agents Order 1999 (S.I. 1999 No. 3137)
- The Maximum Number of Judges Order 1999 (S.I. 1999 No. 3138)
- The Exempt Charities Order 1999 (S.I. 1999 No. 3139)
- The Transfer of Functions (Agriculture and Food) Order 1999 (S.I. 1999 No. 3141)
- The Transfer of Functions (Medicines and Poisons) Order 1999 (S.I. 1999 No. 3142)
- The Transfer of Functions (Road Traffic) Order 1999 (S.I. 1999 No. 3143)
- The Licensing and Registered Clubs (Northern Ireland) Order 1999 (S.I. 1999 No. 3144 (N.I. 10)])
- The Northern Ireland Assembly Commission (Crown Status) Order 1999 (S.I. 1999 No. 3145)
- The Parliamentary Copyright (Northern Ireland Assembly) Order 1999 (S.I. 1999 No. 3146)
- The Welfare Reform and Pensions (Northern Ireland) Order 1999 (S.I. 1999 No. 3147 (N.I. 11)])
- The European Specialist Medical Qualifications Amendment (No. 2) Regulations 1999 (S.I. 1999 No. 3154)
- The Curfew Order (Responsible Officer) Order 1999 (S.I. 1999 No. 3155)
- The Social Security (New Deal Pilot) Regulations 1999 (S.I. 1999 No. 3156)
- The Non-Domestic Rating (Rural Settlements) (England) Order 1999 (S.I. 1999 No. 3158)
- The Occupational Pensions (Revaluation) Order 1999 (S.I. 1999 No. 3159)
- The Habitat (Water Fringe) (Amendment) Regulations 1999 (S.I. 1999 No. 3160)
- The Habitat (Salt-Marsh) (Amendment) Regulations 1999 (S.I. 1999 No. 3161)
- The Wireless Telegraphy (Third Generation Licences) Regulations 1999 (S.I. 1999 No. 3162)
- The Equal Opportunities (Employment Legislation) (Territorial Limits) Regulations 1999 (S.I. 1999 No. 3163)
- The Croydon Community National Health Service Trust (Change of Name) Order 1999 (S.I. 1999 No. 3164)
- The Chemicals (Hazard Information and Packaging for Supply) (Amendment) (No. 2) Regulations 1999 (S.I. 1999 No. 3165)
- The Yugoslavia (Prohibition of Flights) (No. 2) Regulations 1999 (S.I. 1999 No. 3166)
- The Consumer Credit (Total Charge for Credit, Agreements and Advertisements) (Amendment) Regulations 1999 (S.I. 1999 No. 3177)
- The Social Security Act 1998 (Commencement No. 12 and Consequential and Transitional Provisions) Order 1999 (S.I. 1999 No. 3178 (C. 81)])
- The National Health Service (Choice of Medical Practitioner) Amendment Regulations 1999 (S.I. 1999 No. 3179)
- The Telecommunications (Appeals) Regulations 1999 (S.I. 1999 No. 3180)
- The Education (School Day and School Year) (England) Regulations 1999 (S.I. 1999 No. 3181)
- The Novel Foods and Novel Food Ingredients (Amendment) (England) Regulations 1999 (S.I. 1999 No. 3182)
- The Health Act 1999 (Commencement No.1) (Wales) Order 1999 (S.I. 1999 No. 3184 (W.42) (C.82))
- Gorchymyn Deddf Iechyd 1999 (Cychwyniad Rhif 1) (Cymru) 1999 (S.I. 1999 Rhif 3184 (Cy.42) (C.82))
- The General Teaching Council for Wales (Constitution) (Amendment) Regulations 1999 (S.I. 1999 No 3185 (W. 43)])
- Rheoliadau Cyngor Addysgu Cyffredinol Cymru (Cyfansoddiad) (Diwygio) 1999 (S.I. 1999 Rhif 3185 (Cy. 43))
- The Distress for Rent (Amendment) (No. 3) Rules 1999 (S.I. 1999 No. 3186 (L. 27)])
- The Civil Courts (Amendment) (No. 3) Order 1999 (S.I. 1999 No. 3187)
- The Tax Credits (New Deal Pilot Consequential Amendments) (Northern Ireland) Regulations 1999 (S.I. 1999 No. 3188)
- The General Medical Council (Registration (Fees) (Amendment) Regulations) Order of Council 1999 (S.I. 1999 No. 3189)
- The Immigration and Asylum Act 1999 (Commencement No. 1) Order 1999 (S.I. 1999 No. 3190 (C. 83)])
- The Sale of Dogs (Identification Tag) Regulations 1999 (S.I. 1999 No. 3191)
- The Breeding of Dogs (Licensing Records) Regulations 1999 (S.I. 1999 No. 3192)
- The Dangerous Substances and Preparations (Safety) (Consolidation) (Amendment) (No. 2) Regulations 1999 (S.I. 1999 No. 3193)
- The Chemicals (Hazard Information and Packaging for Supply) (Amendment) (No. 3) Regulations 1999 (S.I. 1999 No. 3194)
- The Design Right (Proceedings before Comptroller) (Amendment) Rules 1999 (S.I. 1999 No. 3195)
- The Registered Designs (Amendment) Rules 1999 (S.I. 1999 No. 3196)
- The Patents (Amendment) (No. 2) Rules 1999 (S.I. 1999 No. 3197)
- The Personal and Occupational Pension Schemes (Miscellaneous Amendments) Regulations 1999 (S.I. 1999 No. 3198)

== 3201–3300 ==
- The Betting and Gaming Duties Act 1981 (Bingo Prize Limit) Order 1999 (S.I. 1999 No. 3205)
- The Merchant Shipping (Registration of Ships, and Tonnage) (Amendment) Regulations 1999 (S.I. 1999 No. 3206)
- The Northern Ireland Act 1998 (Appointed Day) Order 1999 (S.I. 1999 No. 3208 (C. 84)])
- The Northern Ireland Act 1998 (Commencement No. 5) Order 1999 (S.I. 1999 No. 3209 (C. 85)])
- The Merchant Shipping (Radio) (Fishing Vessels) Regulations 1999 (S.I. 1999 No. 3210)
- The Education (Education Standards Etc. Grants) (England) Regulations 1999 (Amendment No. 2) Regulations 1999 (S.I. 1999 No. 3211)
- The Tax Credits (Payment by Employers) Regulations 1999 (S.I. 1999 No. 3219)
- The Petty Sessions Areas (Amendment) Order 1999 (S.I. 1999 No. 3220)
- The Contaminants in Food (Amendment) (England and Wales) Regulations 1999 (S.I. 1999 No. 3221)
- The A41 Trunk Road (Barnet) Red Route Traffic Order 1997 Variation Order 1999 (S.I. 1999 No. 3222)
- The A13 By-pass Trunk Road (Barking and Dagenham and Havering) Red Route (Clearway) Traffic Order 1999 (S.I. 1999 No. 3223)
- The A205 Trunk Road (Lewisham) Red Route Traffic Order 1998 Variation Order 1999 (S.I. 1999 No. 3224)
- The Motor Vehicles (Approval) (Amendment) (No. 2) Regulations 1999 (S.I. 1999 No. 3226)
- The Civil Aviation (Navigation Services Charges) (Fourth Amendment) Regulations 1999 (S.I. 1999 No. 3227)
- The Bank of England (Limit on Fiduciary Note Issue) Order 1999 (S.I. 1999 No. 3228)
- The Public Telecommunication System Designation (Sala Limited) Order 1999 (S.I. 1999 No. 3229)
- The Public Telecommunication System Designation (Thus Limited) Order 1999 (S.I. 1999 No. 3230)
- The Public Telecommunication System Designation (Metromedia Fiber Network UK Limited) Order 1999 (S.I. 1999 No. 3231)
- Ionising Radiations Regulations 1999 (S.I. 1999 No. 3232)
- The Public Telecommunication System Designation (Rateflame Limited) Order 1999 (S.I. 1999 No. 3233)
- The Public Telecommunication System Designation (Easynet Group plc) Order 1999 (S.I. 1999 No. 3234)
- The Public Telecommunication System Designation (Drive Memory Limited) Order 1999 (S.I. 1999 No. 3235)
- The Public Telecommunication System Designation (Netkonect Communications Limited) Order 1999 (S.I. 1999 No. 3236)
- The Public Telecommunication System Designation (World-Link Inc) Order 1999 (S.I. 1999 No. 3237)
- The Public Telecommunication System Designation (AT & T-Unisource Communications Services (UK) Limited) Order 1999 (S.I. 1999 No. 3238)
- The Public Telecommunication System Designation (Flag Telecom Ireland Limited) Order 1999 (S.I. 1999 No. 3239)
- The Public Telecommunication System Designation (VIA Net Works UK Ltd) Order 1999 (S.I. 1999 No. 3240)
- The Public Telecommunication System Designation (iaxis Limited) Order 1999 (S.I. 1999 No. 3241)
- The Management of Health and Safety at Work Regulations 1999 (S.I. 1999 No. 3242)
- The Wireless Telegraphy (Licence Charges) (Amendment) Regulations 1999 (S.I. 1999 No. 3243)
- The Environmental Protection (Controls on Injurious Substances) Regulations 1999 (S.I. 1999 No. 3244)
- The London Cab (No. 2) Order 1999 (S.I. 1999 No. 3250)
- The Local Government (Best Value) Performance Plans and Reviews Order 1999 (S.I. 1999 No. 3251)
- Severn Bridges Tolls Order 1999 (S.I. 1999 No. 3252)
- The A1 Trunk Road (Haringey) Red Route (Bus Priority) Experimental Traffic Order 1999 (S.I. 1999 No. 3254)
- The Commonwealth Development Corporation Act 1999 (Appointed Day) Order 1999 (S.I. 1999 No. 3258 (C. 86)])
- The Local Government Pension Scheme (Management and Investment of Funds) (Amendment) Regulations 1999 (S.I. 1999 No. 3259)
- The Civil Aviation (Route Charges for Navigation Services) Regulations 1999 (S.I. 1999 No. 3260)
- The Stamp Duty and Stamp Duty Reserve Tax (Open-ended Investment Companies) (Amendment No. 2) Regulations 1999 (S.I. 1999 No. 3261)
- The Stamp Duty and Stamp Duty Reserve Tax (Investment Exchanges and Clearing Houses) (OM London Exchange Limited) Regulations 1999 (S.I. 1999 No. 3262)
- The Distraint by Collectors (Fees, Costs and Charges) (Stamp Duty Penalties) Regulations 1999 (S.I. 1999 No. 3263)
- The Stamp Duty Reserve Tax (Amendment No. 2) Regulations 1999 (S.I. 1999 No. 3264)
- The Payments to the Churches Conservation Trust Order 1999 (S.I. 1999 No. 3265)
- The Social Fund Maternity and Funeral Expenses (General) Amendment Regulations 1999 (S.I. 1999 No. 3266)
- The General Optical Council (Rules relating to Injury or Disease of the Eye) Order of Council 1999 (S.I. 1999 No. 3267)
- The Civil Aviation (Joint Financing) (Second Amendment) Regulations 1999 (S.I. 1999 No. 3268)
- The Statistics of Trade (Customs and Excise) (Amendment) Regulations 1999 (S.I. 1999 No. 3269)
- The Landfill Tax (Amendment) Regulations 1999 (S.I. 1999 No. 3270)
- The Greater London Authority Act 1999 (Commencement No. 1) Order 1999 (S.I. 1999 No. 3271 (C. 87)])
- The Greater London Authority Act 1999 (Consequential and Transitional Provisions) (Police) order 1999 (S.I. 1999 No. 3272)
- The Scotland Act 1998 (Transitory and Transitional Provisions) (Finance) Amendment Order 1999 (S.I. 1999 No. 3273)
- The Local Government etc. (Scotland) Act 1994 (Exemption from Repeal) (Scotland) Order 1999 (S.I. 1999 No. 3274 (S. 113)])
- The Non-Domestic Rating Contributions (England) (Amendment) Regulations 1999 (S.I. 1999 No. 3275)
- The South Birmingham Mental Health National Health Service Trust (Transfers of Trust Property) Order 1999 (S.I. 1999 No. 3276)
- The Town and Country Planning (Development Plan) (England) Regulations 1999 (S.I. 1999 No. 3280)
- The Merchant Shipping (Seamen's Documents) (Amendment) Regulations 1999 (S.I. 1999 No. 3281)
- The A40 Trunk Road (Western Avenue, London Borough of Ealing) (Prohibition of U-Turn) Order 1999 (S.I. 1999 No. 3282)
- The Sale of Solid Fuel Byelaws (Exemption from Repeal) (Scotland) Order 1999 (S.I. 1999 No. 3283)
- The Special Commissioners (Jurisdiction and Procedure) (Amendment) Regulations 1999 (S.I. 1999 No. 3292)
- The General Commissioners (Jurisdiction and Procedure) (Amendment) Regulations 1999 (S.I. 1999 No. 3293)
- The Special Commissioners (Amendment of the Taxes Management Act 1970) Regulations 1999 (S.I. 1999 No. 3294)
- The Medicines (Pharmacies) (Applications for Registration and Fees) Amendment Regulations 1999 (S.I. 1999 No. 3295)
- The Lord Chancellor's Advisory Committee on Legal Education and Conduct (Provisions on Abolition) Order 1999 (S.I. 1999 No. 3296)
- The Education (Transition to New Framework) (New Schools, Groups and Miscellaneous) Regulations 1999 (Amendment) Regulations 1999 (S.I. 1999 No. 3297)
- The Public Record Office (Fees) (No. 2) Regulations 1999 (S.I. 1999 No. 3298)
- The Legal Advice and Assistance at Police Stations (Remuneration) (Amendment) (No. 2) Regulations 1999 (S.I. 1999 No. 3299)
- The Kirkley Hall College, Ponteland, Northumberland (Dissolution) Order 1999 (S.I. 1999 No. 3300)

== 3301–3400 ==
- The Public Lending Right Scheme 1982 (Commencement of Variation) (No. 2) Order 1999 (S.I. 1999 No. 3304)
- The Premium Savings Bonds (Amendment) Regulations 1999 (S.I. 1999 No. 3305)
- The Lloyd's Underwriters (Special Reserve Funds) Regulations 1999 (S.I. 1999 No. 3308)
- The Welfare Reform and Pensions Act 1999 (Commencement No. 1) Order 1999 (S.I. 1999 No. 3309 (C. 88)])
- The Passenger Transport Executives (Capital Finance) (Amendment) (England) Order 1999 (S.I. 1999 No. 3310)
- The Registration of Births, Deaths and Marriages (Fees) Order 1999 (S.I. 1999 No. 3311)
- Maternity and Parental Leave etc. Regulations 1999 (S.I. 1999 No. 3312)
- The Road Traffic (Permitted Parking Area and Special Parking Area) (Borough of Medway) Order 1999 (S.I. 1999 No. 3313)
- The Road Traffic (Permitted Parking Area and Special Parking Area) (County of Kent) (Borough of Gravesham) Order 1999 (S.I. 1999 No. 3314)
- The Hill Livestock (Compensatory Allowances) (Enforcement) Regulations 1999 (S.I. 1999 No. 3315)
- The Hill Livestock (Compensatory Allowances) Regulations 1999 (S.I. 1999 No. 3316)
- The Afghanistan (United Nations Sanctions) (Channel Islands) (Amendment) Order 1999 (S.I. 1999 No. 3317)
- The Afghanistan (United Nations Sanctions) (Isle of Man) (Amendment) Order 1999 (S.I. 1999 No. 3318)
- The Maximum Number of Stipendiary Magistrates Order 1999 (S.I. 1999 No. 3319)
- The Scotland Act 1998 (Agency Arrangements) (Specification) (No. 2) Order 1999 (S.I. 1999 No. 3320)
- The Scotland Act 1998 (Transfer of Functions to the Scottish Ministers etc.) (No. 2) Order 1999 (S.I. 1999 No. 3321)
- The Holders of Hereditary Peerages (Extension of the Franchise) (Transitional Provisions) Order 1999 (S.I. 1999 No. 3322)
- Transnational Information and Consultation of Employees Regulations 1999 (S.I. 1999 No. 3323)
- The Income Support (General) and Jobseeker's Allowance Amendment (No. 2) Regulations 1999 (S.I. 1999 No. 3324)
- The Coroners (Amendment) Rules 1999 (S.I. 1999 No. 3325)
- The Income Support (General) Amendment (No. 2) Regulations 1999 (S.I. 1999 No. 3329)
- The Double Taxation Relief (Taxes on Income) (Foreign Interest and Dividends) Regulations 1999 (S.I. 1999 No. 3330)
- The Public Telecommunication System Designation (FLAG Atlantic UK Limited) Order 1999 (S.I. 1999 No. 3331)
- The Public Telecommunication System Designation (E.V. Limited) Order 1999 (S.I. 1999 No. 3332)
- The Public Telecommunication System Designation (Pangea Networks (UK) Limited) Order 1999 (S.I. 1999 No. 3333)
- The Public Telecommunication System Designation (Guernsey Telecoms) Order 1999 (S.I. 1999 No. 3334)
- The Public Telecommunication System Designation (Norweb Telecom Limited) Order 1999 (S.I. 1999 No. 3335)
- The Public Telecommunication System Designation (Racal Telecommunications Limited) Order 1999 (S.I. 1999 No.3336)
- The Tir Gofal and Organic Farming (Amendment) (Wales) Regulations 1999 (S.I. 1999 No. 3337 (W.45))
- Rheoliadau Tir Gofal a Ffermio Organig (Diwygio) (Cymru) 1999 (S.I. 1999 Rhif 3337 (Cy.45))
- The Travel Documents (Fees) Regulations 1999 (S.I. 1999 No. 3339)
- The Combined Probation Areas (Bedfordshire) Order 1999 (S.I. 1999 No. 3340)
- The Combined Probation Areas (Staffordshire) Order 1999 (S.I. 1999 No. 3341)
- The Combined Probation Areas (Kent) Order 1999 (S.I. 1999 No. 3342)
- The Combined Probation Areas (Wiltshire) Order 1999 (S.I. 1999 No.3343)
- The Access to Justice Act 1999 (Commencement No. 2 and Transitional Provisions) Order 1999 (S.I. 1999 No. 3344 (C. 89)])
- The Sefton (Parish) Order 1999 (S.I. 1999 No. 3350)
- The Merchant Shipping (Seamen's Wages and Accounts) (Amendment) Regulations 1999 (S.I. 1999 No. 3360)
- The Beef Bones (Amendment) (England) Regulations 1999 (S.I. 1999 No. 3371)
- The Working Time Regulations 1999 (S.I. 1999 No. 3372)
- The Employment Relations Act 1999 (CommencementNo. 3 and Transitional Provision) Order 1999 (S.I. 1999 No. 3374 (C. 90)])
- Employment Rights (Increase of Limits) Order 1999 (S.I. 1999 No. 3375)
- The Greater London Authority Act 1999 (Commencement No. 2) Order 1999 (S.I. 1999 No. 3376 (C. 91)])
- The Legal Advice and Assistance (Scope) (Amendment) Regulations 1999 (S.I. 1999 No. 3377)
- The Legal Aid (Prescribed Panels) (Amendment) Regulations 1999 (S.I. 1999 No. 3378)
- The Non-Domestic Rating (Chargeable Amounts) (England) Regulations 1999 (S.I. 1999 No. 3379)
- The Greater London Authority (Assembly Constituencies and Returning Officers) Order 1999 (S.I. 1999 No. 3380)
- The Peterlee Education Action Zone Order 1999 (S.I. 1999 No. 3381)
- The Easington and Seaham Education Action Zone Order 1999 (S.I. 1999 No. 3382)
- The Dingle Granby Toxteth Education Action Zone Order 1999 (S.I. 1999 No. 3383)
- The Community Learning Partnership Barrow-in-Furness Education Action Zone Order 1999 (S.I. 1999 No. 3384)
- The Sunderland Building Our Future Education Action Zone Order 1999 (S.I. 1999 No. 3385)
- The Learning Together East Cleveland Education Action Zone Order 1999 (S.I. 1999 No. 3386)
- The Wolverhampton Education Action Zone Order 1999 (S.I. 1999 No. 3387)
- The North Gillingham Education Action Zone Order 1999 (S.I. 1999 No. 3388)
- The Rainbow Education Action Zone in Stoke-on-Trent Order 1999 (S.I. 1999 No. 3389)
- The Leigh Park Education Action Zone Order 1999 (S.I. 1999 No. 3390)
- The Ashington Education Action Zone Order 1999 (S.I. 1999 No. 3391)
- The Breaking the Cycle Bridgwater Education Action Zone Order 1999 (S.I. 1999 No. 3392)
- The Bolton Education Action Zone Order 1999 (S.I. 1999 No. 3393)
- The Coventry Millennium Education Action Zone Order 1999 (S.I. 1999 No. 3394)
- The Downham and Bellingham Education Action Zone Order 1999 (S.I. 1999 No. 3395)
- The Epicentre LEAP Ellesmere Port Cheshire Education Action Zone Order 1999 (S.I. 1999 No. 3396)
- The Clacton and Harwich Education Action Zone Order 1999 (S.I. 1999 No. 3397)
- The Challenge for Corby Education Action Zone Order 1999 (S.I. 1999 No. 3398)
- The Action for Learning Partnership, Bedford Education Action Zone Order 1999 (S.I. 1999 No. 3399)
- The Withernsea and Southern Holderness Rural Achievement Education Action Zone Order 1999 (S.I. 1999 No. 3400)

== 3401–3500 ==
- The Road Traffic (Permitted Parking Area and Special Parking Area) (County of Kent) (District of Thanet) Order 1999 (S.I. 1999 No. 3401)
- The Road Traffic (Permitted Parking Area and Special Parking Area) (County of Kent) (City of Canterbury) Order 1999 (S.I. 1999 No. 3402)
- The Road Traffic (Permitted Parking Area and Special Parking Area) (County of Kent) (Borough of Swale) Order 1999 (S.I. 1999 No. 3403)
- The Road Traffic (Permitted Parking Area and Special Parking Area) (County of Kent) (District of Sevenoaks) Order 1999 (S.I. 1999 No. 3404)
- The Road Traffic (Permitted Parking Area and Special Parking Area) (County of Kent) (Borough of Tunbridge Wells) Order 1999 (S.I. 1999 No. 3405)
- The Wakefield Community Learning Partnership Education Action Zone Order 1999 (S.I. 1999 No. 3406)
- The South Bradford Community Learning Partnership Education Action Zone Order 1999 (S.I. 1999 No. 3407)
- The Speke Garston Excellent Education Action Zone Order 1999 (S.I. 1999 No. 3408)
- The Building Regulations (Amendment) (No. 2) Regulations 1999 (S.I. 1999 No. 3410)
- The Export of Goods (Control) (Amendment No. 6) Order 1999 (S.I. 1999 No. 3411)
- The Gloucester Education Achievement Zone Order 1999 (S.I. 1999 No. 3412)
- The Road Transport (Passenger Vehicles Cabotage) Regulations 1999 (S.I. 1999 No. 3413)
- The Camborne, Pool and Redruth Success Zone Education Action Zone Order 1999 (S.I. 1999 No. 3414)
- The Merger Reference (Universal Foods Corporation and Pointing Holdings Limited) (Interim Provision) (Revocation) Order 1999 (S.I. 1999 No. 3415)
- The A40 Trunk Road (Ealing and Hammersmith & Fulham) Red Route Experimental Traffic Order 1999 Experimental Variation Order 1999 (S.I. 1999 No. 3416)
- The London Borough of Barnet (Trunk Roads) Red Route (Priority Traffic Lanes) Experimental Traffic Order 1999 Revocation Order 1999 (S.I. 1999 No. 3417)
- The A23 Trunk Road (Croydon) Red Route Traffic Order 1999 Experimental Variation Order 1999 (S.I. 1999 No. 3419)
- The Welfare Reform and Pensions Act 1999 (Commencement No. 2) Order 1999 (S.I. 1999 No. 3420 (C. 92)])
- The Food (Animal Products from Belgium) (Emergency Control) (England and Wales) Order 1999 (S.I. 1999 No. 3421)
- The Animal Feedingstuffs from Belgium (Control) (England and Wales) (No. 4) Regulations 1999 (S.I. 1999 No. 3422)
- Local Authorities (Capital Finance) (Amendment) (England) Regulations 1999 (S.I. 1999 No. 3423)
- The Police (Secretary of State's Objectives) (No. 3) Order 1999 (S.I. 1999 No. 3424)
- The Criminal Justice Act 1988 (Commencement No. 13) Order 1999 (S.I. 1999 No. 3425 (C. 93)])
- The Crime and Disorder Act 1998 (Commencement No. 6) Order 1999 (S.I. 1999 No. 3426 (C. 94)])
- The Youth Justice and Criminal Evidence Act 1999 (Commencement No. 1) Order 1999 (S.I. 1999 No. 3427 (C.95)])
- The Plant Protection Products (Amendment) (No. 2) Regulations 1999 (S.I. 1999 No. 3430)
- The Health Development Agency (Establishment and Constitution) Order 1999 (S.I. 1999 No. 3431)
- The Health Development Agency Regulations 1999 (S.I. 1999 No. 3432)
- The Greater London Authority Act 1999 (Commencement No. 3 and Transitional Finance Provisions) Order 1999 (S.I. 1999 No. 3434 (C. 96)])
- The Greater London Authority Act 1999 (Transitional and Consequential Finance Provisions) Order 1999 (S.I. 1999 No. 3435)
- The Local Authorities (Calculation of Council Tax Base) (Amendment–Greater London Authority) Regulations 1999 (S.I. 1999 No. 3437)
- The Local Government Pension Scheme (Amendment etc.) Regulations 1999 (S.I. 1999 No. 3438)
- The Non-Domestic Rating Contributions (Wales) (Amendment) Regulations 1999 (S.I. 1999 No. 3439 (W. 47))
- Rheoliadau Cyfraniadau Ardrethu Annomestig (Cymru) (Diwygio) 1999 (S.I. 1999 Rhif 3439 (Cy. 47))
- The Water Industry Act 1999 (Commencement No. 2) Order 1999 (S.I. 1999 No. 3440 (C. 97)])
- The Water Industry (Charges) (Vulnerable Groups) Regulations 1999 (S.I. 1999 No. 3441)
- The Water Industry (Prescribed Conditions) Regulations 1999 (S.I. 1999 No. 3442)
- The Pet Travel Scheme (Pilot Arrangements) (England) Order 1999 (S.I. 1999 No. 3443)
- The Workington Harbour Revision Order 1999 (S.I. 1999 No. 3444)
- The Harbour Works (Environmental Impact Assessment) Regulations 1999 (S.I. 1999 No. 3445)
- The Registration of Restrictive Trading Agreements (Amendment) Regulations 1999 (S.I. 1999 No. 3446)
- The Producer Responsibility Obligations (Packaging Waste) (Amendment) (No. 2) Regulations 1999 (S.I. 1999 No. 3447)
- The Telecommunications (Interconnection) (Carrier Pre-selection) Regulations 1999 (S.I. 1999 No. 3448)
- The Telecommunications (Interconnection) (Number Portability, etc.) Regulations 1999 (S.I. 1999 No. 3449)
- The National Health Service Trusts (Wales) (Dissolution No. 2) Order 1999 (S.I. 1999 No. 3450 (W. 48))
- Gorchymyn Ymddiriedolaethau'r Gwasanaeth Iechyd Gwladol (Cymru) (Diddymu Rhif 2) 1999 (S.I. 1999 Rhif 3450 (Cy. 48))
- The Cardiff and Vale National Health Service Trust Establishment Order 1999 (S.I. 1999 No. 3451 (W.49))
- Gorchymyn Sefydlu Ymddiriedolaeth Gwasanaeth Iechyd Gwladol Caerdydd a'r Fro 1999 (S.I. 1999 Rhif 3451 (Cy.49))
- The Copyright (Certification of Licensing Scheme for Educational Recording of Broadcasts and Cable Programmes) (Educational Recording Agency Limited) (Amendment) Order 1999 (S.I. 1999 No. 3452)
- The Central Rating List (Wales) Regulations 1999 (S.I. 1999 No. 3453 (W.50))
- Rheoliadau Rhestr Ardrethu Canolog (Cymru) 1999 (S.I. 1999 Rhif 3453 (Cy.50))
- The Non-Domestic Rating (Chargeable Amounts) (Wales) Regulations 1999 (S.I. 1999 No. 3454 (W.51))
- Rheoliadau Ardrethu Annomestig (Symiau y Gellir eu Codi) (Cymru) 1999 (S.I. 1999 Rhif 3454 (Cy.51))
- The Local Authorities (Funds) (England) (Amendment No. 2) Regulations 1999 (S.I. 1999 No. 3459)
- The Dental Auxiliaries (Amendment) Regulations 1999 (S.I. 1999 No. 3460)
- The Veterinary Surgeons and Veterinary Practitioners (Registration) (Amendment) Regulations Order of Council 1999 (S.I. 1999 No. 3461)
- The Land Registration (No. 3) Rules 1999 (S.I. 1999 No. 3462)
- The Prescription Only Medicines (Human Use) Amendment (No. 2) Order 1999 (S.I. 1999 No. 3463)
- The Beef Bones (Amendment) (Wales) Regulations 1999 (S.I. 1999 No. 3464 (W.52))
- Rheoliadau Esgyrn Cig Eidion (Diwygio) (Cymru) 1999 (S.I. 1999 Rhif 3464 (Cy.52))
- The Housing Accommodation (Persons Subject to Immigration Control) (Amendment) (Wales) Order 1999 (S.I. 1999 No. 3465 (W53))
- Gorchymyn Cartrefi i Bobl Fyw Ynddynt (Personau sy'n Ddarostyngedig i Reolaeth Fewnfudo) (Diwygio) (Cymru) 1999 (S.I. 1999 Rhif 3465 (Cy.53))
- The Northern Birmingham Community Health and the Southern Birmingham Community Health National Health Service Trusts (Dissolution) Order 1999 (S.I. 1999 No. 3466)
- The Birmingham Specialist Community Health National Health Service Trust (Establishment) Order 1999 (S.I. 1999 No. 3467)
- The Housing Renewal Grants (Amendment) (Wales) Regulations 1999 (S.I. 1999 No. 3468 (W.54))
- Rheoliadau Grantiau Adnewyddu Tai (Diwygio) (Cymru) 1999 (S.I. 1999 Rhif 3468 (Cy.54))
- The Relocation Grants (Form of Application) and (Welsh Form of Application) (Amendment) (Wales) Regulations 1999 (S.I. 1999 No. 3469 (W.55))
- Rheoliadau Grantiau Adleoli (Ffurflen Gais) a (Ffurflen Gais Gymraeg) (Diwygio) (Cymru) 1999 (S.I. 1999 Rhif 3469 (Cy.55))
- The Housing Renewal Grants (Prescribed Form and Particulars) and (Welsh Form and Particulars) (Amendment) (Wales) Regulations 1999 (S.I. 1999 No. 3470 (W.56))
- Rheoliadau Grantiau Adnewyddu Tai (Ffurflen a Manylion a Ragnodir) a (Ffurflen a Manylion Cymraeg) (Diwygio) (Cymru) 1999 (S.I. 1999 Rhif 3470 (Cy.56))
- The Alexandra Health Care, the Kidderminster Health Care, the Worcestershire Community Healthcare and the Worcester Royal Infirmary National Health Service Trusts (Dissolution) Order 1999 (S.I. 1999 No. 3471)
- The Worcestershire Community and Mental Health National Health Service Trust (Establishment) Order 1999 (S.I. 1999 No. 3472)
- The Worcestershire Acute Hospitals National Health Service Trust (Establishment) Order 1999 (S.I. 1999 No. 3473)
- The Pesticides (Maximum Residue Levels in Crops, Food and Feeding Stuffs) (England and Wales) Regulations 1999 (S.I. 1999 No. 3483)
- The Family Proceedings (Amendment No. 2) Rules 1999 (S.I. 1999 No. 3491 (L. 28))

== See also ==
- List of statutory instruments of the United Kingdom
