= Unconscionability in English law =

Unconscionability in English law is a field of contract law and the law of trusts, which precludes the enforcement of voluntary (or consensual) obligations unfairly exploiting the unequal power of the consenting parties. "Inequality of bargaining power" is another term used to express essentially the same idea for the same area of law, which can in turn be further broken down into cases on duress, undue influence and exploitation of weakness. In these cases, where someone's consent to a bargain was only procured through duress, out of undue influence or under severe external pressure that another person exploited, courts have felt it was unconscionable (i.e., contrary to good conscience) to enforce agreements. Any transfers of goods or money may be claimed back in restitution on the basis of unjust enrichment subject to certain defences.

Considerable controversy is still present over whether "iniquitous pressure" must actually be exercised by a defendant in order for a voluntary obligation to be voidable. While it seems clear that in cases of undue influence the pressure need not come from the person who may lose the contract, it is open to debate whether circumstances exist where an obligation should be voidable simply because the person was pressured by circumstances wholly outside a defendant's control.

One of the most prominent cases in this area is Lloyds Bank Ltd v Bundy, where Lord Denning MR advocated that there be a general principle to govern this entire area. He called the concept "inequality of bargaining power", while the American case espousing an equivalent doctrine, Williams v. Walker-Thomas Furniture Co. (1965), termed the issue one of "unconscionability". Note that even though it is accepted that an "inequality of bargaining power" is relevant to the doctrine of undue influence, Lord Denning's broader dictum on a general equitable principle of an "inequality of bargaining power" was later rejected by the House of Lords in the 1985 case National Westminster Bank plc v Morgan.

If a man fails to fulfil an agreed contract – unless he had contracted to do something forbidden by law or decree, or gave his consent under some inquitous pressure, or was involuntarily prevented from fulfilling his contract because of some unlooked-for accident – an action for such an unfulfilled agreement should be brought in the tribal courts, if the parties have not previously been able to reconcile their differences before arbitrators (their neighbours, that is).

— Plato, The Laws, Book 11, §23, Contracts.

== History ==
- James v Morgan (1663) 83 Eng Rep 323 refused to enforce contract calculating purchase price of a horse based upon 2 pence for the first nail in the horse's shoes, doubled for each of an additional 31 nails.
- Vernon v Bethell
- Earl of Chesterfield v Janssen (1751) 28 Eng Rep 82, 100, unconscionability "may be apparent from the intrinsic nature and subject of the bargain itself; such as no man in his senses and not under a delusion would make on the one hand, and as no honest man would accept on the other; which are unequitable and unconscientious bargains, and of such even the common law take notice".

== Duress ==
=== Physical threats ===
Duress has been defined as a "threat of harm made to compel a person to do something against his or her will or judgment; esp., a wrongful threat made by one person to compel a manifestation of seeming assent by another person to a transaction without real volition". An example is in Barton v Armstrong, a decision of the Privy Council. Armstrong threatened to kill Barton if he did not sign a contract, so the court set the contract aside. An innocent party wishing to set aside a contract for duress to the person need only to prove that the threat was made and that it was a reason for entry into the contract; the onus of proof then shifts to the other party to prove that the threat had no effect in causing the party to enter into the contract. There can also be duress to goods and sometimes, the concept of 'economic duress' is used to vitiate contracts.

=== Economic duress ===
- The Atlantic Baron or North Ocean Shipping Co Ltd v Hyundai Construction Co Ltd [1979] QB 705
- Pao On v Lau Yiu Long [1980] AC 614
- Universe Tankships Inc of Monrovia v International Transport Workers' Federation [1982] 2 All ER 67
- Atlas Express Ltd v Kafco [1989] QB 833
- CTN Cash and Carry Ltd v Gallaher Ltd [1994] 4 All ER 714, lawful act duress?
- Alec Lobb (Garages) Ltd v Total Oil (Great Britain) Ltd [1984] EWCA Civ 2, [1983] 1 WLR 87, 94, refusal to waive existing contractual obligations is not duress, because there is no wrongful threat.

=== Consideration ===
- Pinnel's Case (1602) 5 Co. Rep. 117a
- Stilk v Myrick [1809] EWHC KB J58
- Foakes v Beer (1884) 9 App Cas 605
- D & C Builders Ltd v Rees [1965] 2 QB 617
- Williams v Roffey Bros & Nicholls (Contractors) Ltd [1991] 1 QB 1

== Undue influence ==
Undue influence is an equitable doctrine that involves one person taking advantage of a position of power over another person. The law presumes that in certain classes of special relationship, such as between parent and child, or solicitor and client, there will be a special risk of one party unduly influencing their conduct and motives for contracting. As an equitable doctrine, the court has the discretion to vitiate such a contract. When no special relationship exists, the general rule is whether there was a relationship of such trust and confidence that it should give rise to such a presumption.

- Allcard v Skinner (1887) 36 Ch D 145

=== Actual undue influence ===
- Williams v Bayley (1886) LR 1 HL 200, Bayley's son forged his father's signature on promissory notes and gave them to Williams. Williams threatened Bayley with criminal prosecution, so Bayley made an equitable mortgage to get back the notes. House of Lords upheld the cancellation of the agreement.
- Bank of Montreal v Stuart 1911] AC 120, 136) and the transaction resulted from that influence.
- Mutual Finance ltd v John Wetton and Sons Ltd [1937] 2 KB 389
- BCCI v Aboody [1992] 4 All ER 955
- CIBC Mortgages plc v Pitt [1993] 4 All ER 433

=== Presumed undue influence ===
- Tate v Williamson (1886) LR 2 Ch App 55
- Barclays Bank plc v O'Brien [1993] 4 All ER 417
- Royal Bank of Scotland v Etridge (No 2) [2001] UKHL 41
- Thompson v Foy [2009] EWHC 1076 (Ch)

== Exploitation or unconscionable bargain ==
- Earl of Chesterfield v Janssen (1751) 2 Ves Sen 125, equity intervenes to relieve against unconscionable bargains
- Earl of Aylesford v Morris (1873) LR 8 Ch App 484
- Fry v Lane (1888) 40 Ch D 312
- Cresswell v Potter [1978] 1 WLR 255
- The Medina (1876) 2 PD 5
- Alec Lobb Garages Ltd v Total Oil (GB) Ltd [1985] 1 WLR 173
- Backhouse v Backhouse [1978] 1 WLR 243, 251, Balcombe J could not fit in an intelligent woman into the Fry v Lane criteria but citing Bundy said, obiter dicta, that entering a contract without independent advice because of "great emotional strain" could be another way the law could develop.
- Burmah Oil Co Ltd v Governor of the Bank of England (1981) noted 125 Sol Jo 528, the Bank bought Burmah Oil's shares in BP on request from Burmah, who was very financially embarrassed because the share price had fallen and Burmah's borrowings were structured on the basis that BP shares would be higher. It looked like Burmah may collapse, and the Bank did not want BP shares to go foreign. But afterwards, Burmah claimed the Bank took unfair advantage of bargaining power inequality in buying the shares and making a profit. Walton J doubted Lord Denning MR's principle. Note that Burmah was always advised by expert lawyers and merchant bankers and would have got no better price elsewhere (because selling such a large block of shares would depress the price).

== A general principle? ==
- Lloyds Bank Ltd v Bundy [1975] QB 326
- National Westminster Bank plc v Morgan [1985] AC 686, 698

== Statutory regulation ==
- Unfair Contract Terms Act 1977
- Unfair Terms in Consumer Contracts Regulations 1999
- Unfair Contract Terms Bill

== See also ==
- English contract law
- English unjust enrichment law
- Duress (contract law)
- Undue influence
- Economic tort
- Baird Textile Holdings Ltd v Marks & Spencer plc
- Vegelahn v. Guntner 167 Mass. 92, 107 (1896) Holmes J, "The word "threats" often is used as if, when it appeared that threats had been made, it appeared that unlawful conduct had begun. But it depends on what you threaten. As a general rule, even if subject to some exceptions, what you may do in a certain event you may threaten to do, that is, give warning of your intention to do in that event, and thus allow the other person the chance of avoiding the consequences."
