= Times Travel (UK) Ltd v Pakistan International Airlines Corp =

Pakistan International Airlines Corp v Times Travel (UK) Ltd
- Court: UK Supreme Court
- Citation: [2021] UKSC 40

Keywords
- Economic duress

Pakistan International Airlines Corp v Times Travel (UK) Ltd [2021] UKSC 40 is an English contract law case concerned with economic duress. Judgment was given on 18 August 2021.

== Facts ==
Times Travel, travel agents, claimed to set aside an agreement with Pakistan International Airlines Corporation (PIAC), which was the only operator of direct flights from the UK to Pakistan. That was most of TT's business. Agents had brought claims for nonpayment of commissions, and PIAC aimed to start new contracts and force the agents to accept them and waive existing claim for unpaid commissions. TT accepted the terms, and then claimed it entered the new deal under economic duress. It sought to recover its commissions.

In the High Court, Warren J held there was economic duress. The Court of Appeal held the claimant failed to establish economic duress, since the pressure was lawful and there was no bad faith.

== Judgment ==
The Supreme Court held that there was no duress. PIAC giving notice that the previous contract would be terminated and cutting TT's ticket allocation was not reprehensible conduct in the sense used in the case law, and it genuinely believed it was not liable to pay the disputed commissions.

Lord Hodge (Lord Reed, Lord Lloyd-Jones and Lord Kitchin agreeing) said the following:

3. The boundaries of the doctrine of lawful act duress are not fixed and the courts should approach any extension with caution, particularly in the context of contractual negotiations between commercial entities. In any development of the doctrine of lawful act duress it will also be important to bear in mind not only that analogous remedies already exist in equity, such as the doctrines of undue influence and unconscionable bargains, but also the absence in English law of any overriding doctrine of good faith in contracting or any doctrine of imbalance of bargaining power. As I will seek to explain, the absence of those doctrines in English law leads me to conclude that Times Travel's claim for lawful act economic duress would not have succeeded in this case even if it had shown that Pakistan International Airline Corporation ("PIAC") had made what Lord Burrows has defined as a bad faith demand.

4. If one focuses on the few cases in which a remedy has been provided for what would now be analysed as lawful act duress, there are to date two circumstances in which the English courts have recognised and provided a remedy for such duress. The first circumstance is where a defendant uses his knowledge of criminal activity by the claimant or a member of the claimant’s close family to obtain a personal benefit from the claimant by the express or implicit threat to report the crime or initiate a prosecution. The second circumstance is where the defendant, having exposed himself to a civil claim by the claimant, for example, for damages for breach of contract, deliberately manoeuvres the claimant into a position of vulnerability by means which the law regards as illegitimate and thereby forces the claimant to waive his claim. In both categories of case the defendant has behaved in a highly reprehensible way which the courts have treated as amounting to illegitimate pressure.

(1) The first circumstance: exploitation of knowledge of criminal activity

5. The examples of the first circumstance are the three cases to which Lord Burrows refers in para 89 of his judgment. In Williams v Bayley 1 HL 200 a son forged his father's signature indorsing promissory notes for substantial amounts of money. Representatives of the bank, on discovering the forgery, put pressure on the father to undertake to repay the sums. The representatives stated that they could not compound a felony (ie stifle a prosecution) and that conviction for the offence would involve transportation for life. The father, faced with this implicit threat to prosecute his son unless he took on the debt, undertook to pay the debt and granted an equitable mortgage of his property to secure it. The House of Lords held that the contract was illegal as it was an agreement to stifle a prosecution and, separately, the contract was invalid on the equitable ground that it had been procured by undue influence.

...

(3) Summarising the cases where the court has found lawful act duress

17. The three earlier cases, Williams v Bayley, Kaufman v Gerson and Mutual Finance Ltd, were all cases in which the court treated the attempt by the party to uphold or enforce the contract as being unconscionable because of that party's behaviour. In Borrelli, the Board described Mr Ting's conduct as unconscionable and treated "illegitimate" as a synonym for unconscionable. In that case and The Cenk K it was the combination of (i) the existence of legal claims by B against A and (ii) the manoeuvring by A of B by reprehensible means into a vulnerable position where it had no alternative but to waive its pre-existing rights that amounted to illegitimate pressure.

...

20. The ideas of an improper motive for action or illegitimate pressure are closely aligned with the equitable concept of unconscionability. In Universe Tankships Inc of Monrovia v International Transport Workers Federation (The Universe Sentinel) [1983] 1 AC 366 Lord Diplock discussed the development of the common law of economic duress. He stated (p 384) that the rationale for this development of the common law was that a person’s apparent consent to a contract had been induced by pressure exercised upon him by the other party "which the law does not regard as legitimate" with the result that the consent was treated as revocable. He continued:

It is a rationale similar to that which underlies the avoidability of contracts entered into and the recovery of money exacted under colour of office, or under undue influence or in consequence of threats of physical duress." (Emphasis added)

...

23. The place of lawful act economic duress in English law needs to be seen against the backdrop of the remedies which equity already provides. Unconscionability is not an overarching criterion to be applied across the board without regard to context. Were it so, judges would become arbiters of what is morally and socially acceptable. Equity takes account of the factual and legal context of a case and has identified specific contexts which call for judicial intervention to protect the weaker party. For example, the equitable doctrine of undue influence may result in a contract being set aside when two persons have a relationship in which A has acquired influence or ascendancy over B and A takes unfair advantage of its influence or ascendancy: Royal Bank of Scotland Plc v Etridge (No 2) [2002] 2 AC 773, paras 6-8 per Lord Nicholls of Birkenhead. It applies typically where there is a relationship of trust and confidence between A and B which A exploits to the detriment of B: “Chitty on Contracts” (ed Hugh Beale 33rd ed (2018)), paras 8-058 to 8-059.

...

(5) The absence in English law of a doctrine of inequality of bargaining power and of a principle of good faith in contracting

26. It is not in dispute that there is in English common law no doctrine of inequality of bargaining power in contract, although such inequality may be a relevant feature in some cases of undue influence: National Westminster Bank Plc v Morgan [1985] AC 686, 708 per Lord Scarman. As Lord Scarman observed in The Universe Sentinel (p 401), when he referred to the judgment of Lord Wilberforce and Lord Simon in Barton v Armstrong, in commercial life many acts are done under pressure and sometimes overwhelming pressure. In negotiating a commercial contract each party to the negotiations seeks to obtain contractual entitlements which he or she does not possess unless and until the parties agree the terms of the contract. Inequality of bargaining power means that one party in the negotiation of a commercial contract may be able to impose terms on a weaker party which a party of equal bargaining power would refuse to countenance. Equally, a party in a strong bargaining position, such as a monopoly supplier, may refuse outright to enter into a contract which the weaker party desires or may impose terms which the weaker party considers to be harsh. The courts have taken the position that it is for Parliament and not the judiciary to regulate inequality of bargaining power where a person is trading in a manner which is not otherwise contrary to law. See for example Hilton v Eckersley (1855) 6 E & B 47, 74-75; 119 ER 781, 792 per Baron Alderson; Mogul Steamship Co Ltd v McGregor, Gow & Co [1892] AC 25, 36 per Lord Halsbury LC; OBG Ltd v Allan [2007] UKHL 21; [2008] AC 1, para 56 per Lord Hoffmann; CTN (above), at p 717 per Steyn LJ, and in this case, at paras 103 and 107 per David Richards LJ.

27. The English law of contract seeks to protect the reasonable expectations of honest people when they enter into contracts. It is an important principle which is applied to the interpretation of contracts: Lord Steyn, "Contract law: Fulfilling the reasonable expectations of honest men" (1997) 113 LQR, 433-442, 433; and Mannai Investment Co Ltd v Eagle Star Life Assurance Co Ltd [1997] AC 749 at 771A per Lord Steyn. But, in contrast to many civil law jurisdictions and some common law jurisdictions, English law has never recognised a general principle of good faith in contracting. Instead, English law has relied on piecemeal solutions in response to demonstrated problems of unfairness: Interfoto Picture Library Ltd v Stiletto Visual Programmes Ltd [1989] QB 433, 439 per Bingham LJ; MSC Mediterranean Shipping Co SA v Cottonex Anstalt [2016] EWCA Civ 789; [2017] 1 All ER (Comm) 483, para 45 per Moore-Bick LJ.

28. The absence of these doctrines restricts the scope for lawful act economic duress in commercial life. In chapter 5 of his book, The Use and Abuse of Unjust Enrichment (Oxford 1991), Professor Jack Beatson (later to become Beatson LJ) discussed the development of the modern doctrine of economic duress and the severe limitations on its application in commercial negotiation. At pp 129-130 he explained the basic approach of the common law in these terms:

"All that is not prohibited is permitted and there is no general doctrine of abuse of rights. If therefore a person is permitted to do something, he will generally be allowed to do it for any reason or for none. In the context of contractual negotiations this position enables people to know where they stand and provides certainty as to what is acceptable conduct in the bargaining process but it does leave many forms of socially objectionable conduct unchecked. Again, this is soundly based for judges should not, as a general rule, be the arbiters of what is socially unacceptable and attach legal consequences to such conduct."

He suggested (p 134) that the scope for lawful act duress in contractual negotiations was “extremely limited”. I agree.

29. Anson's Law of Contract, 31st ed (2020) (J Beatson, A Burrows and J Cartwright eds) similarly recognises this restrictive approach to the law of duress in contractual negotiations (p 379, ch 10.2(d)):

"It is not ordinarily duress to threaten to do that which one has a right to do, for instance to refuse to enter into a contract or to terminate a contract lawfully. In the cut-and-thrust of business relationships various types of pressure may be brought to bear in differing situations. … [A] contracting party will not be permitted to escape from its contractual obligations merely because it was coerced into making a contract by fear of the financial consequences of refusing to do so. Although this approach leaves many forms of socially objectionable conduct unchecked, as a general rule the determination of when socially objectionable conduct which is not in itself unlawful should be penalized is for the legislature rather than the judiciary."

30. Against this commercial background the pressure applied by a negotiating party will very rarely come up to the standard of illegitimate pressure or unconscionable conduct. It will therefore be a rare circumstance that a court will find lawful act duress in the context of commercial negotiation.

...

39. In summary, several jurisdictions, such as Australia, New Zealand and Singapore, have adopted a circumspect approach to economic duress and lawful act duress. Jurisdictions with a general requirement of good faith in contract, such as Canada and the United States, may be expected to be more open to a claim of economic duress in the context of what Lord Burrows has described as a “bad faith demand”.

...

44. ... As I have said (paras 26-30 above), there is no doctrine of inequality of bargaining power and no general principle of good faith in contracting in English law. A commercial party in negotiation with another commercial party is entitled to use its bargaining power to obtain by negotiation contractual rights which it does not have until the contract is agreed. A powerful commercial party, such as a monopoly supplier or monopoly purchaser, can impose onerous terms, for example demanding a premium, as a condition for entering into a transaction with another party. Steyn LJ does not suggest otherwise. The implication of his judgment may be that the dishonest assertion of a pre-existing entitlement to payment accompanied by a threat to carry out a lawful act, such as to withdraw credit arrangements on future contracts or to refuse to enter into further contracts, could amount to lawful act duress as a form of an abuse of right.

...

52. I therefore do not accept that the lawful act doctrine could be extended to a circumstance in which, without more, a commercial organisation exploits its strong bargaining power or monopoly position to extract a payment from another commercial organisation by an assertion in bad faith of a pre-existing legal entitlement which the other organisation believes or knows to be incorrect.

53. Lord Burrows would extend the doctrine further. In his view Borrelli and The Cenk K support the conclusion that a demand by A that B waive a claim against it would be a "bad faith demand" if A did not genuinely believe that it had a defence to the claim. If A then used its bargaining power and nothing more to make B vulnerable to its demand or to increase B’s vulnerability, the combination of the bad faith demand and the manoeuvring would, he argues, be sufficient to establish lawful act duress. I respectfully disagree...

Lord Burrows concurred in the result, but reasoned his judgment as follows.

78. Where it is alleged that one contracting party (the defendant) has induced the other contracting party (the claimant) to enter into the contract between them by duress, the case law has laid down that there are two essential elements that a claimant needs to establish in order to succeed in a claim for rescission of the contract. The first is a threat (or pressure exerted) by the defendant that is illegitimate. The second is that that illegitimate threat (or pressure) caused the claimant to enter into the contract. As Lord Goff said, in the context of economic duress, in Dimskal Shipping Co SA v International Transport Workers’ Federation (The Evia Luck) (No 2) [1992] 2 AC 152, 165:

"[I]t is now accepted that economic pressure may be sufficient to amount to duress [which would entitle a party to avoid a contract] provided at least that the economic pressure may be characterised as illegitimate and has constituted a significant cause inducing the plaintiff to enter into the relevant contract …"

79. It is also important that, in the context of economic duress (but the position appears to be different in respect of other forms of duress: see Astley v Reynolds (1731) 2 Strange 916), there is a third element. This is that the claimant must have had no reasonable alternative to giving in to the threat (or pressure): see, for example, Dyson J in DSND Subsea Ltd (formerly DSND Oceantech Ltd) v Petroleum Geo-Services ASA [2000] BLR 530, para 131; Borrelli v Ting [2010] UKPC 21; [2010] Bus LR 1718, para 35.

80. As both parties accepted, the dispute in this case is solely concerned with the first element: the illegitimacy of the threat or pressure. It is not in dispute that the claimant can establish causation and that it had no reasonable alternative to giving in to the threat.

...

112. Taken together, what Borrelli v Ting and Progress Bulk Carriers can be taken to have established is that, in relation to a demand for a waiver by the threatened party of a claim against the threatening party, the demand is unjustified, so that the lawful act economic threat is illegitimate where: first, the threatening party has deliberately created, or increased, the threatened party’s vulnerability to the demand; and, secondly, the “bad faith demand” requirement is satisfied (ie the threatening party does not genuinely believe that it has a defence, and there is no defence, to the claim being waived).

...

138. Applying the analysis of the law summarised in para 136 to this case, my conclusion is that the decision of the Court of Appeal was correct largely for the reasons it gave (although it was unnecessary for it to have taken, what I have termed, the wider interpretation of CTN Cash and Carry). Lawful act economic duress was not made out on the facts of this case because the threatened lawful act was not coupled with a bad faith demand. On the facts found by Warren J, TT failed to establish bad faith by PIAC in the specific sense relating to PIAC’s genuine belief as to its not being contractually liable for the unpaid commission. The Court of Appeal correctly applied the “bad faith demand” requirement in this case. I would therefore dismiss the appeal.

== See also ==
- English contract law
