= Barclays Bank plc v O'Brien =

Barclays Bank plc v O’Brien
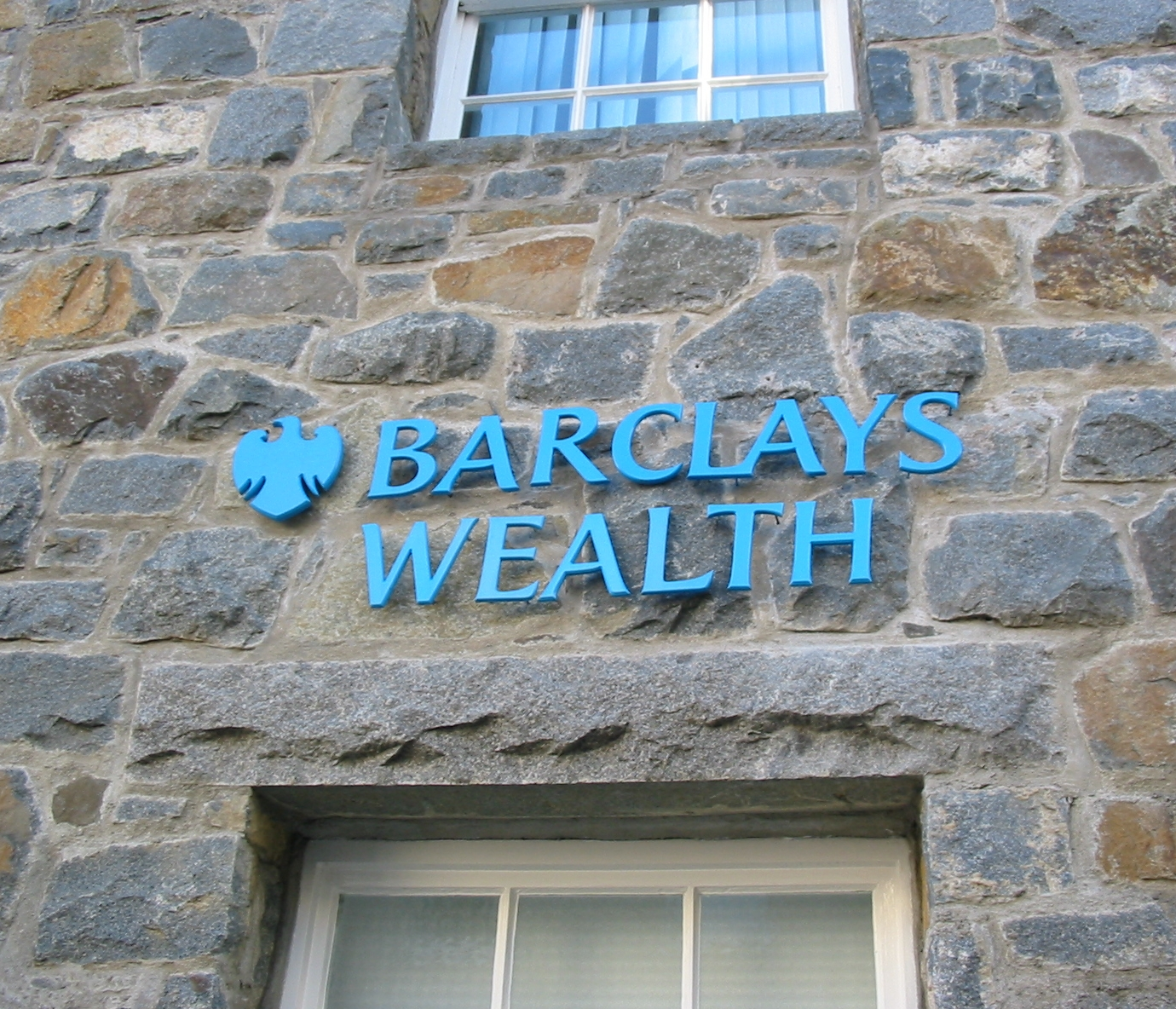
- Court: House of Lords
- Decided: 21 October 1993
- Citations: [1993] UKHL 6, [1993] 4 All ER 417

Case history
- Prior action: Barclays Bank Plc v O 'Brien [1993] QB 109, [1992] EWCA Civ 11

Court membership
- Judges sitting: Lord Browne-Wilkinson, Lord Templeman, Lord Woolf, Lord Slynne of Hadley, Lord Lowry

Case opinions
- Decision by: Lord Browne-Wilkinson

Keywords
- Undue influence

Barclays Bank plc v O’Brien [1993] UKHL 6 (21 October 1993) is an English contract law case relating to undue influence. It set out the basic categories of undue influence as:

- (1) actual undue influence
- (2A) presumed undue influence from a special relationship
- (2B) presumed undue influence from readily ascertainable facts raising suspicion of undue influence.

== Facts ==
A house at 151 Farnham Lane, Slough, was owned jointly by Mr and Mrs O’Brien’s names jointly. They had a £25,000 mortgage secured on the property with a building society. Mr Tucker, who worked for Barclays Bank plc, when the mortgage was increased to £60,000 in 1981 made a note that Mrs O’Brien "might be a problem". In 1987 Mr O’Brien’s company, Heathrow Fabrications Ltd, was in financial difficulty and he agreed with the Barclays Woolwich branch to raise the company’s overdraft to £135,000, reducing to £120,000 after three weeks, guaranteed by Mrs O’Brien and secured on their house with a second charge. The Woolwich branch sent a message to the Burnham branch where Mrs O’Brien was meant to sign the mortgage agreement saying that the branch should tell her of the full effects, but they did not follow the instructions. Mrs O’Brien saw a document and did not read it. It said ‘obtain independent legal advice before signing this letter’ but she just signed it and was not given a copy. By November 1987 the company was still in financial difficulty and demands for repayments on the loan were not met leading to the bank to seek possession of the house. Mrs O’Brien argued she was unduly influenced into the contract and that she was not bound.

== Judgment ==
The judge ordered possession, saying that a misrepresentation by Mr O’Brien did not make the bank responsible.

=== Court of Appeal ===
Purchas, Butler-Sloss and Scott LJJ said it was "artificial" to find undue influence on the basis that a spouse (or other relative) was acting as the bank's agent in obtaining a signature for a charge. Rather, they said, relief should be given on the basis of a special equity in favour of wives, from Turnbull v Duval. They said she only thought £60,000 was being secured, and no more. The result was upheld by the House of Lords.

=== House of Lords ===
The House of Lords held that the contract was voidable for undue influence.

Lord Browne-Wilkinson started by setting out the policy debate. On the one hand, a more equal society had developed in which it had become usual for both husband and wife to have a title to their home on the deeds. And both should consent with open eyes to dealings in their property. On the other hand, people’s homes were an important source of security and it was vital that banks be able to take security on them. The bank would be liable to having its security set aside if it had either actual or constructive notice of undue influence. Constructive notice is when you are aware of a relationship which would put you on inquiry. It is then up to you to ensure that there is no undue influence. He noted the two categories of actual and presumed undue influence, and in the latter the complainant has to show ‘a relationship of trust and confidence… of such a nature that it is fair to presume that the wrongdoer abused that relationship in procuring the complainant to enter into the impugned transaction.’ Then the burden shifts to the other side, to show that a transaction was freely entered into, for instance ‘by showing that the complainant had independent advice. The confidential relationship can be shown either that it is one of ‘Certain relationships (for example solicitor and client, medical advisor and patient’ which in law raise a presumption or ‘the de facto existence of a relationship under which the complainant generally reposed trust and confidence…’

In a key passage, Lord Browne-Wilkinson set out the structure of undue influence.

A person who has been induced to enter into a transaction by the undue influence of another (the wrongdoer) is entitled to set that transaction aside as against the wrongdoer. Such undue influence is either actual or presumed. In Bank of Credit and Commerce International SA v Aboody (1988) [1992] 4 All ER 955 at 964 the Court of Appeal helpfully adopted the following classification.

Class 1: actual undue influence. In these cases it is necessary for the claimant to prove affirmatively that the wrongdoer exerted undue influence on the complainant to enter into the particular transaction which is impugned.
Class 2: presumed undue influence. In these cases the complainant only has to show, in the first instance, that there was a relationship of trust and confidence between the complainant and the wrongdoer of such a nature that it is fair to presume that the wrongdoer abused that relationship in procuring the complainant to enter into the impugned transaction. In Class 2 cases therefore there is no need to produce evidence that actual undue influence was exerted in relation to the particular transaction impugned: once a confidential relationship has been proved, the burden then shifts to the wrongdoer to prove that the complainant entered into the impugned transaction freely, for example by showing that the complainant had independent advice. Such a confidential relationship can be established in two ways, viz.,

Class 2(A)

Certain relationships (for example solicitor and client, medical advisor and patient) as a matter of law raise the presumption that undue influence has been exercised.

Class 2(B)

Even if there is no relationship falling within Class 2(A), if the complainant proves the de facto existence of a relationship under which the complainant generally reposed trust and confidence in the wrongdoer, the existence of such relationship raises the presumption of undue influence. In a Class 2(B) case therefore, in the absence of evidence disproving undue influence, the complainant will succeed in setting aside the impugned transaction merely by proof that the complainant reposed trust and confidence in the wrongdoer without having to prove that the wrongdoer exerted actual undue influence or otherwise abused such trust and confidence in relation to the particular transaction impugned.

The idea of a private meeting was put forward by Lord Browne-Wilkinson in his judgment:

for the future in my judgment a creditor will have satisfied these requirements if it insists that the wife attend a private meeting (in the absence of the husband) with a representative of the creditor at which she is told of the extent of her liability as surety, warned of the risk she is running and urged to take independent legal advice. If these steps are taken in my judgment the creditor will have taken such reasonable steps as are necessary to preclude a subsequent claim that it had constructive notice of the wife's rights.

However, in practice the suggested private meeting has been resisted by lenders and not proved realistic.

== Timing of judgment ==
The decision in O'Brien was handed down on the same day as CIBC Mortgages plc v Pitt [1993] UKHL 7 (21 October 1993) (where Lord Browne-Wilkinson also gave the only speech). O'Brien was technically handed down first, and in Pitt Lord Browne-Wilkinson makes reference to his "earlier" judgment in O'Brien. The composition of the judges in the House of Lords was identical in both cases.

== Subsequent cases ==
The issue of presumed undue influence came before the House of Lords again in Royal Bank of Scotland plc v Etridge (No 2) [2001] UKHL 44 (11 October 2001), and in that case a majority of the court (Lords Hodge, Clyde and Hobhouse) cast doubt on the categorisation and sub-categorisation of classes of undue influence. However, notwithstanding that decision, most academic textbooks persist with the classification set out in Barclay's Bank v O'Brien.

== See also ==
- English contract law
- Iniquitous pressure in English law
- Lloyds Bank Ltd v Bundy [1975] QB 326
- Williams v. Walker-Thomas Furniture Co. 350 F.2d 445 (United States Court of Appeals for the District of Columbia Circuit, 1965)
