= North Ocean Shipping Co. Ltd. v Hyundai Construction Co., Ltd. =

The Atlantic Baron
- Court: High Court
- Full case name: North Ocean Shipping Co. Ltd. v. Hyundai Construction Co., Ltd.
- Decided: 10 July 1978
- Citation: [1979] QB 705
- Transcript

Court membership
- Judge sitting: Mocatta J

Case opinions
- Mocatta J

Keywords
- Duress

North Ocean Shipping Co. Ltd. v Hyundai Construction Co., Ltd. [1979] QB 705 is an English contract law case relating to duress.

== Facts ==
Hyundai were shipbuilders who entered into a contract dated 10 April 1972 with North Ocean Shipping to build an oil tanker named the "Atlantic Baron". The price for constructing the ship was payable in five instalments, and the builders had agreed to a reverse letter of credit, for repayment of installments in the event of default on the construction. In 1973, after the first instalment was paid, the US dollar was devalued. Hyundai said they would not deliver unless the price was increased by ten per cent. North Ocean was worried they would lose a favourable charter with Shell. They said they would pay the extra money in a telex message on 28 June 1973 because they wished "to maintain an amicable relationship and without prejudice to our rights". North Ocean also asked for the letter of credit to contain a corresponding increase, and this was done.

The ship was subsequently delivered to North Ocean on 27 November 1974, and later on 30 July 1975 they first referred the matter to legal action, initially via arbitration. The arbitrators found in favour of Hyundai but referred a question on recovery of sums paid to the High Court.

== Judgment ==
Mocatta J held that "preserving amicable relations" was not worthwhile consideration, but that increasing the letter of credit price was good consideration. He then asked if the whole agreement was procured by duress for the threat to break the original agreement. He noted ‘the best known case’ of Maskell v Horner, and also Skeate v Beale, where Lord Denman CJ said an agreement was not void because it was made under duress of goods, but noted that older cases do not deal with what happens when the threat is to breach a contract. He decided that there was such a thing as economic duress, a threat to break a contract is one form and if it led to a contract for valuable consideration ‘I think that contract is a voidable one which can be avoided and the excess money paid under it recovered.’ The agreement here was caused by ‘economic duress’. ‘The owners made a very reasonable offer of arbitration coupled with security for any award in the yard’s favour that might be made, but this was refused… I do not consider the yard’s ignorance of the Shell charter material. It may well be that had they known of it they would have been even more exigent.’ However, because of the 8-month delay in bringing the case to court, economic duress could not be found in this case: 'the action and inaction of the owners can only be regarded as an affirmation of the variation.'

== See also ==
- English contract law
- Lloyds Bank Ltd. v. Bundy [1975] QB 326
- Williams v. Walker-Thomas Furniture Co. 350 F.2d 445 (C.A. D.C. 1965)
- Atlas Express Ltd v Kafco [1989] QB 833
