= Cresswell v Potter =

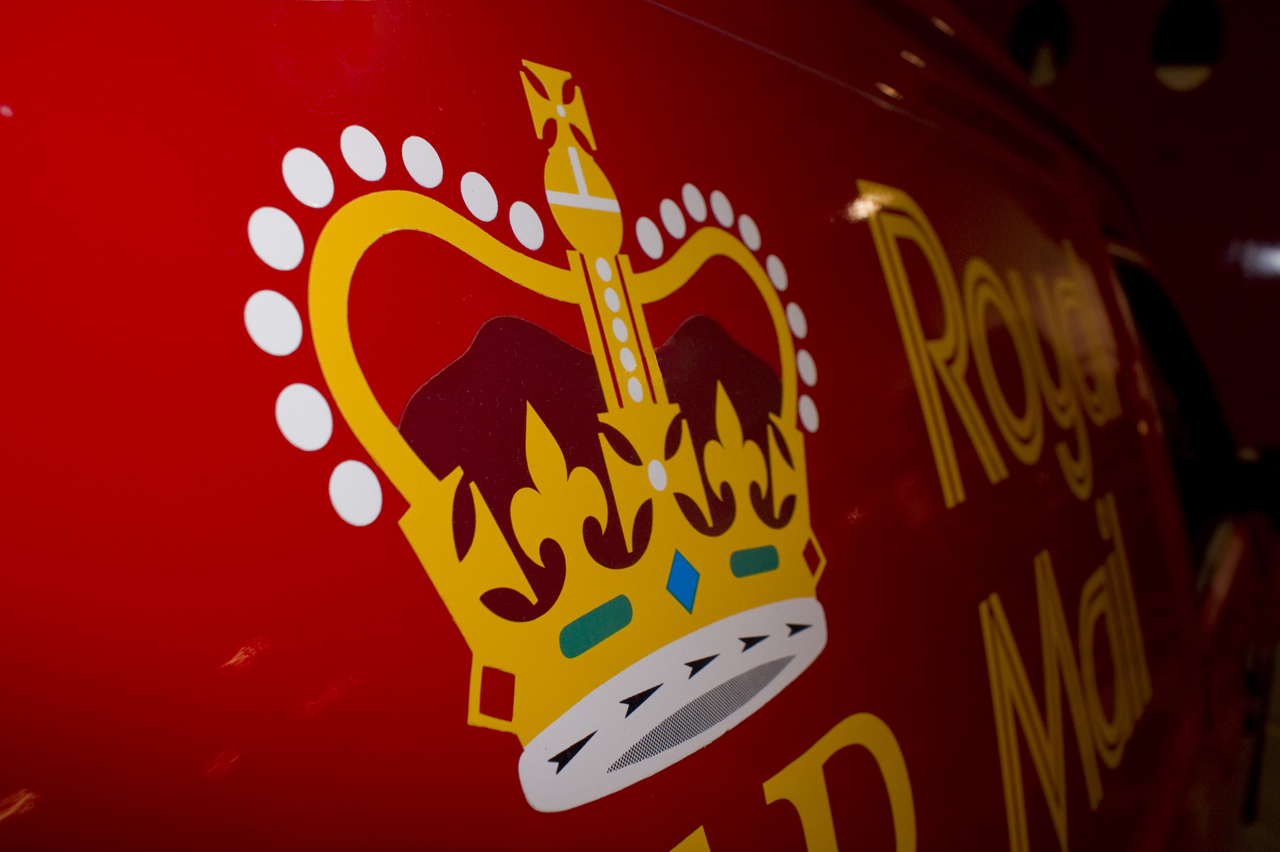
- Court: High Court
- Citation: [1978] 1 WLR 255

Case opinions
- Megarry J

Keywords
- Exploitation

Cresswell v Potter [1978] 1 WLR 255 is an English contract law case relating to exploitation of weakness allowing escape from a contract.

== Facts ==
Ms Cresswell was a telephonist for the Post Office. She divorced from Mr Potter, and then contracted to convey him her interest in Slate Hall in return for release from mortgage liability. Two years later, Mr Potter sold the property for £3350, making a £1400 profit. Ms Cresswell successfully argued that she should get half because he had exploited her weaknesses so much as to vitiate her consent to the contract, and she was vulnerable to this because she was the modern equivalent to a "poor and ignorant" person (Fry v Lane).

== Judgment ==
Megarry J said the first of the (non exhaustive) requirements from Fry v Lane is to be ‘poor and ignorant’, the second is whether the sale was at a considerable undervalue and the third is whether there was any independent advice. In more modern euphemisms, ‘poor and ignorant’ would be ‘member of the lower income group’ and ‘less highly educated’. Because Ms Cresswell was a van driver for a tobacconist and now a PO telephonist, had slender means and was on legal aid, this was enough:

Further, although no doubt it requires considerable alertness and skill to be a good telephonist, I think that a telephonist can properly be described as ‘ignorant’ in the context of property transactions in general and the execution of conveyancing documents in particular. I have seen and heard the plaintiff giving evidence, and I have reached the conclusion that she satisfies the requirements of the first head.

On the point of independent advice, he noted that on one side stood Mr Potter, his solicitor and the inquiry agent, and on the other Ms Cresswell alone.

Lord Justice Nourse noted in the case of Credit Lyonnais Bank Nederland NV v Helen Burch that Megarry J's decision in this case "demonstrates that the jurisdiction [on iniquitous pressure] is in good heart and capable of adaptation to different transactions entered into in changing circumstances".

== See also ==
- English contract law
- Iniquitous pressure in English law
- Lloyds Bank Ltd v Bundy [1975] QB 326
- Williams v. Walker-Thomas Furniture Co. 350 F.2d 445 (C.A. D.C. 1965)
