= Thompson v Foy =

- Court: Chancery Division
- Decided: 20 May 2009
- Citation: [2009] EWHC 1076 (Ch)

Case opinions
- Lewison J

Keywords
- Actual occupation, overriding interests, undue influence

Thompson v Foy [2009] EWHC 1076 (Ch) (20 May 2009) is an English land law case concerning the right of a person with an overriding interest in a home and deals with a family arrangement for a house to be a gift transferring from a mother to a daughter and the trust between the two parties that the daughter would pay the mother her sum to buy out her share of the property.

== Summary ==
"A claim to set aside a deed of family arrangement and deed of gift transferring a property from a mother to her daughter based on undue influence failed where the kind of trust in play between the parties was no more than a trust that a daughter would keep her promise to her mother to pay her a sum to buy out her share, and there had been no actual undue influence and the mother had accepted that she was taking a risk."

== Abstract ==
"In conjoined actions, the court was required to determine issues concerning ownership and beneficial interest in a property, and priority over a registered charge. In the first action, the claimant (T) was the mother of the defendant (F). T, who was a widow, had shared her property with F and her family, and allowed them to build a substantial self-contained extension to live in, paid for by F. T acknowledged that the extension belonged to F. F and her family subsequently expressed an interest in moving to Spain, taking T with them.

At that time, F did not have the money to fund the purchase of a Spanish property unless her part of the value of the property was realised. It was agreed that F would buy out T's share of the property for £200,000 and then mortgage the property and rent it out to cover the mortgage. T would then receive the £200,000 and F would use the excess to purchase a Spanish home. T lent F £20,000 to put a deposit on a Spanish property. F then applied for a buy-to-let mortgage from a company (X) which was the claimant in the second action, wrongly stating that she owned the property at that time. Following repeated requests for reassurance from F, T subsequently transferred the property to F via a deed of family arrangement and deed of gift.

She then decided that she no longer wanted to move to Spain, and began searching instead for her own bungalow. When the mortgage moneys were released to F by X, F informed T that she could not pay her the £200,000 because she had been advised that if T were to die within seven years she would have to pay inheritance tax on her part of the money. F offered T £60,000, with the remainder to be paid in seven years. A dispute then arose between T and F, as a result of which the property was not let out. In consequence, the mortgage was not paid and arrears amounted. X repossessed the property and obtained a money judgment against F.

T claimed to be entitled to set aside the documents by which F came to be registered as proprietor of the property and that her right to do so had priority over the registered charge because it was an overriding interest. It fell to be determined whether (i) F was entitled to any beneficial interest in the property, and the extent of any such interest; (ii) T was entitled to set aside the deed of family arrangements and deed of gift to F on the ground of undue influence; (iii) if T was so entitled, her right to do so was binding on X; (iv) F had repaid to T the sum lent to pay for the deposit on the Spanish property."

== Judgment ==
F was entitled to a beneficial interest in the property based on proprietary estoppel. There had been a mutual understanding between T and F that if F built an extension it would belong to her. T had failed to establish that F had not acted in reliance on that representation, and F established her claim to ownership of the extension.

(2) Unacceptable conduct amounting to undue influence might arise out of a relationship between two persons where one had acquired over the other a measure of influence or ascendancy, of which the ascendant person took unfair advantage. Whether a transaction had been brought about by undue influence was a question of fact, Royal Bank of Scotland plc v Etridge (No 2) [2001] UKHL 44, [2002] 2 AC 773 applied. On the evidence, there had not been a complete relationship of trust and confidence between T and F, as T had appreciated that she was taking a risk, although F had promised to pay T the £200,000. The kind of trust in play was no more than a trust that a daughter would keep her promise to her mother.

No presumption of undue influence arose, therefore, and the burden was on T to prove that F had actually used undue influence to procure that the transaction went ahead. The fact that F's promise had been repeatedly and sincerely given did not amount to undue influence. Accordingly, the claim to set aside the deed of family arrangement and the gift of the legal title had to fail.

(3) Even if, contrary to that finding, T had been entitled to set aside the transaction on the ground of undue influence, that would not have affected the registered estate at the date of the charge in favour of X because the claim based on undue influence would not crystallise until F's misappropriation of the mortgage moneys and the equity would not arise until that time. (4) F had not repaid the £20,000 that T had lent to her and it was still owing.

Lewison J said the following

Where actual occupation is relied on as causing the interest to affect the estate, this suggests that there must be actual occupation both at the date of the disposition and also at the time of registration. Paragraph 2 of Schedule 3 begins with the words: "An interest belonging at the time of the disposition to a person in actual occupation". If it had been intended that actual occupation at the time of the disposition was the sole criterion, the phrase would more naturally have read: "An interest belonging to a person in actual occupation at the time of the disposition

== See also ==
- Land Registration Act 2002
- Leasehold estate
- Equitable interest
- English land law
