= Bank of Montreal v Stuart =

JCPC decision from Canada on undue influence

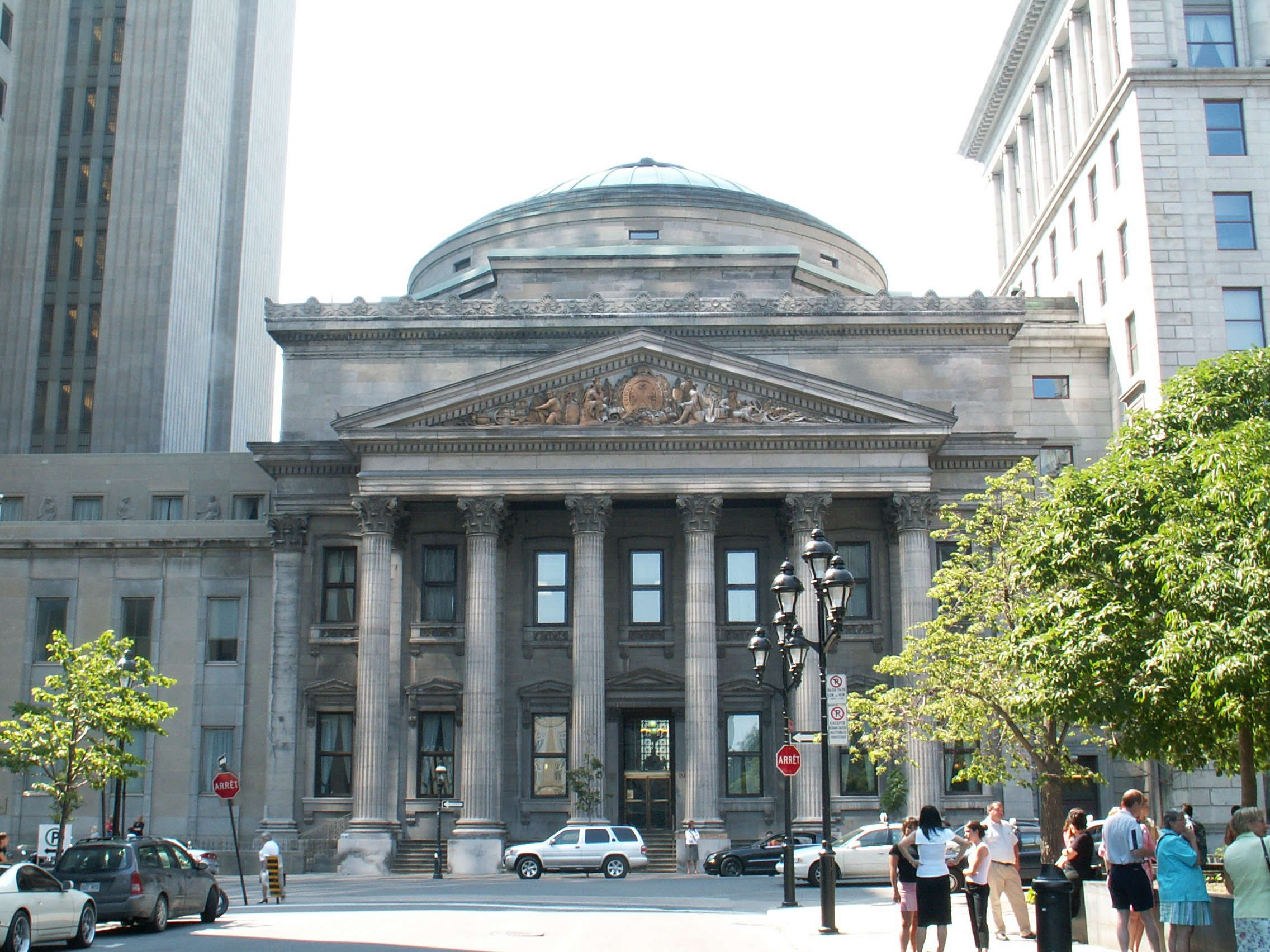
- Bank of Montreal building, Montreal, Quebec
- Court: Judicial Committee of the Privy Council
- Full case name: Bank of Montreal v Jane Jacques Stuart and Another
- Decided: 2 December 1910
- Citation: [1911] AC 120, [1910] UKPC 53

Case history
- Appealed from: Supreme Court of Canada

Court membership
- Judges sitting: Lord Macnaghten; Lord Collins; Lord Shaw of Dunfermline; Sir Arthur Wilson

Case opinions
- Decision by: Lord Macnaghten

Keywords
- undue influence

Bank of Montreal v Stuart is a decision of the Judicial Committee of the Privy Council on appeal from the Supreme Court of Canada. It deals with the principle of undue influence in relation to contracts, in the particular context of dealings between spouses. Decided in 1910, the case continues to be cited in the courts in Canada and in England and Wales.

== Facts ==
Jane Stuart, the respondent to the action, was a resident of the province of Ontario. She owned considerable property in her own name. Her father had been a successful businessman and had given her a substantial house during his lifetime, and left his entire estate to her. The estate was estimated to be in the neighbourhood of $250,000, (which would be approximately $6,774,000 in 2025 dollars).

Jane Stuart was married to John Stuart, a businessman who was a shareholder in the Maritime Sulphite Company, Limited, of Chatham, New Brunswick in Canada. That company had never turned a profit. Stuart and the other shareholders in the company were heavily indebted to the Bank of Montreal in relation to the company. In the 1890s, the bank exerted commercial pressure on John Stuart and the other shareholders to provide additional guarantees for their liabilities to the bank.

John Stuart did not have much remaining assets himself, and his fellow shareholders were reluctant to invest any more money in the company. John Stuart suggested to the bank that he obtain money and a guarantee from his wife, originally in the amount of $100,000. This he duly did, and Jane Stuart executed the guarantee on 24 February 1896. At the same time she also granted mortgages over land and other investments to the bank. On 11 April 1898 she gave a further guarantee, and on 2 October 1903 and 20 July 1904 she granted further mortgages. All of the property in question was Jane Stuart's personal property, inherited from her father. In exchange for mortgages and guarantees in the neighbourhood of $240,000, she received shares in the company from her husband and the other investors, worth about $24,000.

Jane Stuart did not have any independent legal advice in these transactions. The only lawyer involved in the transactions was Alexander Bruce, QC, who was simultaneously acting for the bank and for John Stuart. Bruce was also a business associate of John Stuart and a shareholder in the company in question. Bruce drew up all of the various documents requested by John Stuart, and Jane Stuart signed them. Bruce made some changes to the documents that John Stuart did not request, which favoured the bank and exposed Jane Stuart to greater liability than originally planned.

The company did not prosper and the bank sought to enforce the guarantees. Bruce, the bank's solicitor, acknowledged that Jane Stuart was "absolutely cleaned out."

== Decisions of the Canadian courts ==
=== Trial ===
Jane Stuart brought an action in the Ontario High Court of Justice to rescind the various mortgages and security interests which she had granted. On 10 December 1907, the trial judge dismissed the action with costs, noting that "Mrs. Stuart is a lady of intelligence and refinement", who had been the sole executrix of her father's estate, totalling around $250,000. He noted that John Stuart denied that he had exerted any undue influence over his wife, and also that she had received shares in the company from her husband and the other shareholders, worth about $23,500, in exchange for the guarantees. The trial judge held that John Stuart had acted with "utmost good faith" towards both the bank and Jane Stuart. The trial judge rejected the argument that a married women must always receive independent legal advice.

=== Ontario Court of Appeal ===
Jane Stuart appealed to the Appellate Division of the Supreme Court of Ontario. A panel of four judges heard the appeal and gave their decision on 10 November 1908.

The Court divided evenly. Two judges, Justice Featherston Osler and Justice J.J. MacLaren, concluded that the trial judge was correct and would dismiss the appeal.

The other two judges, Chief Justice Charles Moss and Justice J.T. Garrow, concluded that she was entitled to relief and would direct that the matter be remitted for trial. They concluded that although a married woman has full legal authority in relation to her own property, the wife must always receive independent legal advice in transactions between husband and wife which benefit the husband. Moss relied on a recent decision of the Supreme Court of Canada, Cox v Adams, in support of that conclusion

As the Court was evenly divided, the appeal failed and the trial decision stood.

=== Supreme Court of Canada ===
Jane Stuart appealed to the Supreme Court of Canada. That Court, sitting in a panel of five, ruled by a 4-1 majority in her favour on 5 April 1909. Citing their own decision in Cox v Adams, they concluded that a married woman is always entitled to independent legal advice in transactions with her husband. The Court set aside the trial court decision and directed that the matter be sent to trial.

== Judgment of the Privy Council ==
At that time, the Judicial Committee of the Privy Council was the ultimate appellate body for the British Empire, including appeals from the Supreme Court of Canada. The Bank of Montreal appealed the Supreme Court's decision to the Judicial Committee. On 2 December 1910, the Judicial Committee rejected the bank's appeal.

The judgment was delivered by Lord Macnaghten. He began by stating that the Supreme Court's principle from Cox v Adam could not be supported. However, he took a fundamentally different view of the case from that taken by the trial judge.

Rather than setting out a detailed narrative of the facts, Lord Macnaghten quoted in full the letters of the transaction which the Bank itself had put in evidence, although noting that one of John Stuart's letters mentioned in that correspondence had not been put in evidence. He also noted that Bruce, in drawing up the documents, stated that he was acting for the Bank, and acknowledged that neither John Stuart nor Jane Stuart had any other legal advisor.

Having reviewed the evidence, Lord Macnaghten concluded that Jane Stuart had simply accepted the demands made upon her: "The evidence is clear that in all these transactions Mrs. Stuart, who was a confirmed invalid, acted in passive obedience to her husband's directions. She had no will of her own. Nor had she any means of forming an independent judgment even if she had desired to do so." He added "She was ready to sign anything that her husband asked her to sign and do anything he told her to do." He also discounted her contrary assertion that she had acted of her own free will, noting: "Her declarations in the course of her cross-examination that she acted of her own free will and not under her husband's influence merely shew how deeprooted and how lasting the influence of her husband was."

He then added:

It may well be argued that when there is evidence of overpowering influence and the transaction brought about is immoderate and irrational, as it was in the present case, proof of undue influence is complete. However that may be, it seems to their Lordships that in this case there is enough, according to the recognized doctrine of Courts of Equity, to entitle Mrs. Stuart to relief.

Lord Macnaghten concluded that John Stuart had taken unfair advantage of his wife's confidence in him. He also strongly criticised the actions of Bruce, who was acting for the Bank, but also for John Stuart, and would also benefit personally from the guarantees given by Jane Stuart. He added that: "The Bank left everything to Mr. Bruce and the Bank must be answerable for what he did." Bruce's intervention in giving advice to Jane Stuart left her worse off than if he had not intervened at all. He should have insisted on independent legal advice. Failing that, he should have withdrawn entirely, and advised the Bank why he did so.

Lord Macnaghten therefore concluded that the appeal from the Supreme Court should be dismissed, although for different reasons, and confirmed the order of the Supreme Court, which had directed that the matter go to trial.

== Relevance of the case today ==
=== Canada ===
The case continues to be cited in Canadian legal sources and by the courts, as relevant to the issue of undue influence and relations between spouses.

=== England and Wales ===
Although technically not binding on the courts in England and Wales, decisions of the Judicial Committee have considerable persuasive value in those courts, even when decided under the law of another Commonwealth jurisdiction, in this case the common law of Canada. The case therefore is cited for the purpose of the law of England and Wales.

The decision was an important one in the early development of the law of undue influence. It continues to be cited as authority today for key propositions:

1. The court used the phrase "immoderate and irrational" to describe the character of a transaction which might of its nature suggest undue influence such as to put a third party on notice.
2. A solicitor who is advising a client about a transaction and has reason to suspect that the client is the victim of undue influence is placed under a duty to the client to try and protect her.
3. The relationship of husband and wife was not one which, as a matter of law, would raise a presumption of undue influence.

Chitty on Contracts cites the case as authority for the proposition that the person exercising undue influence over a person need not put direct pressure on the other person. Jane Stuart "... succeeded in establishing undue influence even though her husband had put no pressure on her because none was needed, as 'she had no will of her own ... she was ready to sign and do anything he told her to do.'"

The proposition of the case has modern value in business venture loans where final court of appeal decisions such as Royal Bank of Scotland plc v Etridge (No 2) are followed, which developed the proposition further, leading to the widespread independent provision of "Etridge advice" to a spouse or other joint owner not set to benefit from a transaction. The House of Lords cited Bank of Montreal v Stuart in the Etridge case.

== See also ==
- Undue influence in English law
