= De Mattos v Gibson =

1859 English case

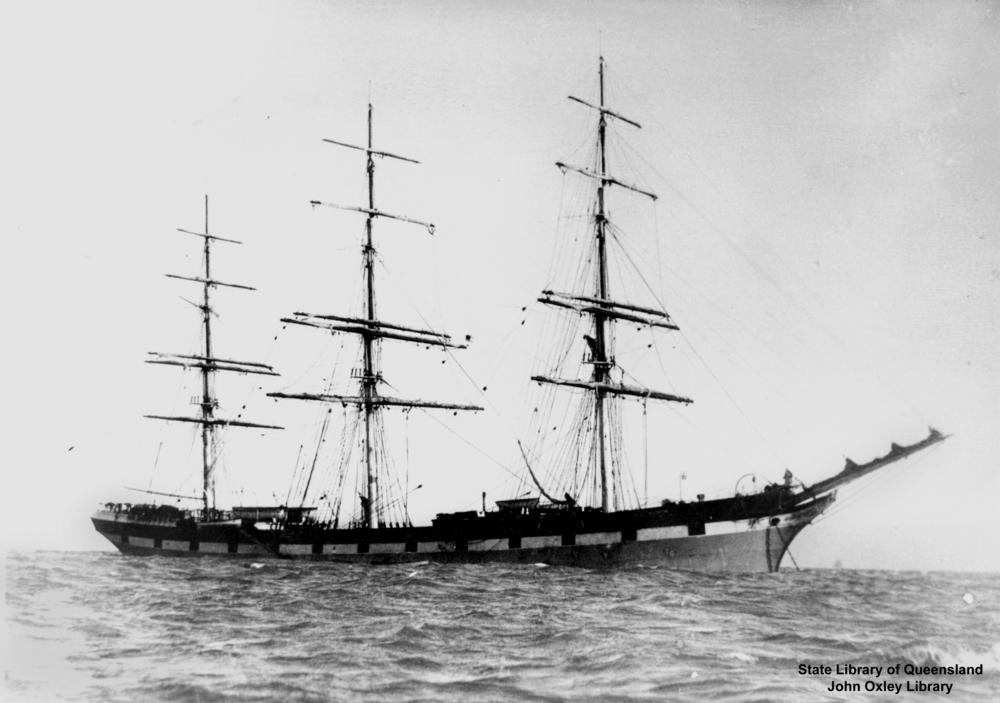
- Citation: (1859) 4 De G&J 276, 45 ER 108, 28 LJ Ch 165, 5 Jur NS 347, 7 WR 152, [1843-60] All ER Rep 803, 32 LTOS 268

Keywords
- secured assets; prior contract with third party; postponement of power of sale

De Mattos v Gibson (1859) is an English case, concerning the taking/grant of security for a loan over property where the lender knows of a prior binding commitment. The court held, on the facts, it would be only fair to postpone the power of sale asserting this as a general principle where facts are closely similar.

== Facts ==
In 1857, the plaintiff had chartered a ship (The Allerton) to carry coal from the Tyne to Suez to fulfil a contract (a charter-party). In the Channel it suffered damage and put in for repairs. Gibson, who held a mortgage over the ship from next January, paid for repairs and effectively took possession (control) of the ship in October 1858 with a view to securing its return to Newcastle so that he could exercise his power of sale. The plaintiff applied for an injunction to restrain Gibson’s threatened action on the ground that it would be inconsistent with the legally required performance of the charter-party (in private, civil law) of which Gibson had known when he had taken his mortgage.

== Judgment ==
Knight Bruce LJ held:

Reason and justice seem to prescribe that, at least as a general rule, where a man, by gift or purchase, acquires property from another, with knowledge of a previous contract, lawfully and for valuable consideration made by him with a third person, to use and employ the property for a particular purpose in a specified manner, the acquirer shall not, to the material damage of the third person, in opposition to the contract and inconsistently with it, use and employ the property in a manner not allowable to the giver or seller. This rule, applicable alike in general as I conceive to moveable and immoveable property, and recognised and adopted, as I apprehend, by the English law, may, like other general rules, be liable to exceptions arising from special circumstances; but I see at present no room for any exception in the instance before us.

== Applied in ==
Swiss Bank Corpn v Lloyds Bank Ltd [1979] Ch 548; [1979] 3 WLR 201; [1979] 2 All ER 853, High Court (EWHC) decision by Browne-Wilkinson J

== Considered in ==
Law Debenture Trust Corpn v Ural Caspian Oil Corpn Ltd [1993] 1 WLR 138

== Distinguished in ==
Bower v Bantam Investments Ltd [1972] 1 WLR 1120; [1972] 3 All ER 349, Ch D

== See also ==
- English property law
- Unconscionability in English law
