= Williams v Bayley =

English contract law case

- Court: House of Lords
- Full case name: Henry Williams and Others v James Bayley
- Citation: (1866) LR 1 HL 20

Keywords
- Undue influence

Williams v Bayley (1866) LR 1 HL 200 is an English contract law case relating to undue influence.

== Facts ==
Mr Bayley’s son forged his father's signature on promissory notes and gave them to Mr Williams. Mr Williams threatened Mr Bayley that he would bring criminal prosecution against his son unless he granted an equitable mortgage to get back the notes.

== Judgment ==
The House of Lords upheld the cancellation of the agreement, on account of undue influence. The agreement was cancelled on the ground that he was influenced by threat.

== See also ==
- English contract law
- Iniquitous pressure in English law
- Lloyds Bank Ltd v Bundy [1975] QB 326
- Williams v. Walker-Thomas Furniture Co. 350 F.2d 445 (C.A. D.C. 1965)
