= Tate v Williamson =

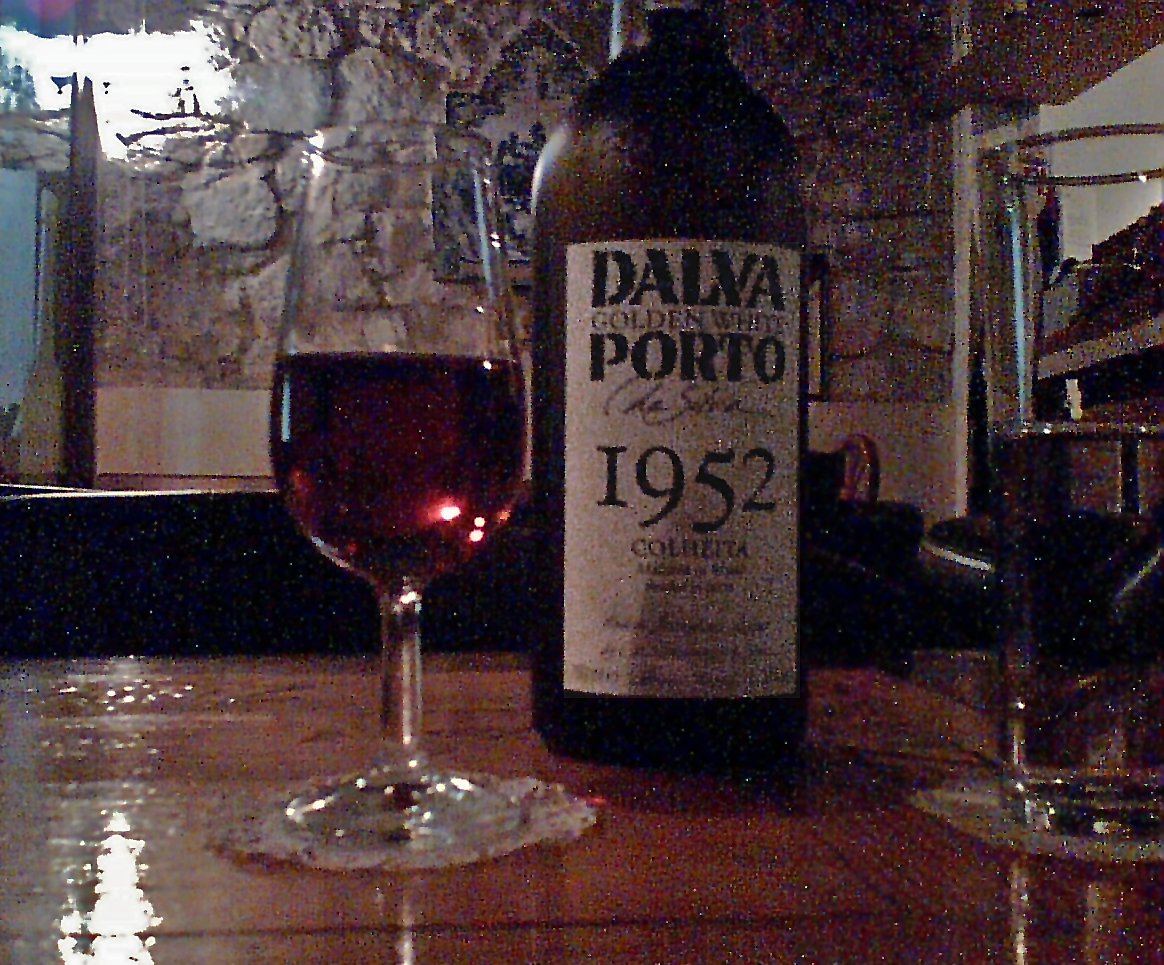
- Court: House of Lords
- Citation: (1886) LR 2 Ch App 55

Case opinions
- Lord Chelmsford

Keywords
- Undue influence

Tate v Williamson (1886) LR 2 Ch App 55 is an English contract law case relating to undue influence.

== Facts ==
The defendant became the financial adviser to an Oxford University undergraduate who sold him his estate for half its value and then drank himself to death, aged 24. The executors applied for the transaction to be set aside.

== Judgment ==
Lord Chelmsford held that the executors would be successful in setting the contract aside. ‘The jurisdiction exercised by courts of equity over the dealings of persons standing in certain fiduciary relations has always been regarded as one of the most salutary description… The courts have always been careful not to fetter this jurisdiction by defining the exact limits of its exercise.’

== See also ==
- English contract law
- Iniquitous pressure in English law
- Lloyds Bank Ltd v Bundy [1975] QB 326
- Williams v. Walker-Thomas Furniture Co. 350 F.2d 445 (C.A. D.C. 1965)
