= National Westminster Bank plc v Morgan =

English contract law case

Natwest plc v Morgan
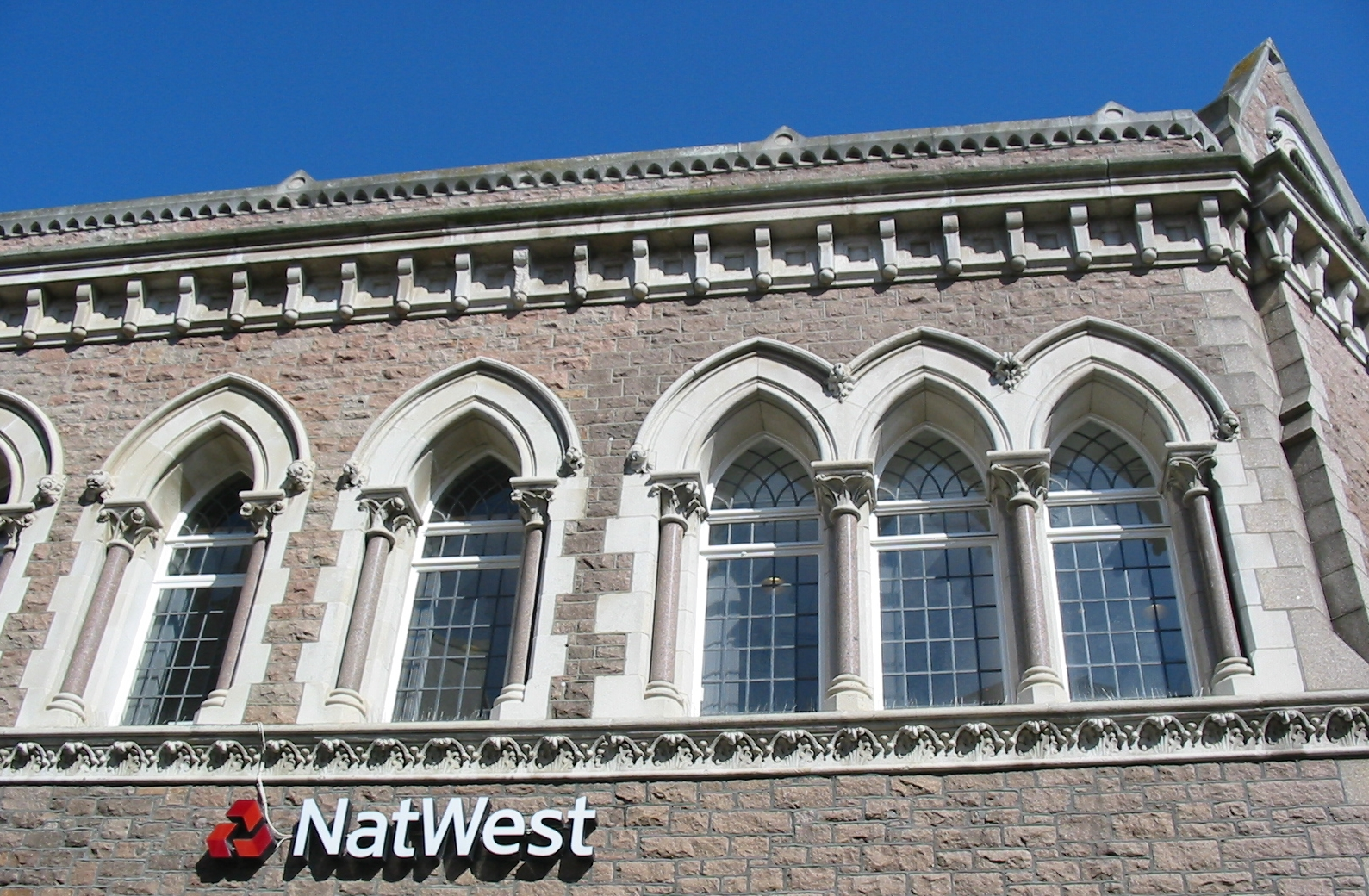
- Court: House of Lords
- Full case name: National Westminster Bank plc v A.P. Morgan
- Decided: 7 March 1985
- Citations: [1985] UKHL 2 [1985] AC 686 [1985] 1 All ER 821

Court membership
- Judges sitting: Lord Scarman; Lord Keith of Kinkel; Lord Roskill; Lord Bridge of Harwich; Lord Brandon of Oakbrook

Case opinions
- Lord Scarman

Keywords
- Undue influence, bank

National Westminster Bank plc v Morgan [1985] UKHL 2 is a judicial decision of the House of Lords relating to English contract law and the doctrine of undue influence. The case is most well known for the comments of Lord Scarman about the supposed requirement of "manifest disadvantage" to set aside a contract for undue influence.

== Facts ==
A bank manager who worked for National Westminster Bank came to Mrs Morgan’s house to get her to sign a charge, which was going to provide security for the refinance of the family home. She received no independent advice. Mr Morgan died, and the bank later sought to enforce the charge. Mrs Morgan resisted enforcement on the grounds that she had entered into the documents acting under the undue influence of the bank.

Mr Barrow went to the Morgan's to arrange signature of the legal charge. The conduct of the visit is described in some detail in the final judgment:

Mr. Barrow's visit to the house lasted 15 to 20 minutes. His conversation with Mrs. Morgan lasted only five minutes. Mrs. Morgan's concern was lest the document which she was being asked to sign might enable the husband to borrow from the bank for business purposes. She wanted the charge confined to paying off the Abbey National and to the provision of bridging finance for about five weeks. She told Mr. Barrow that she had no confidence in her husband's business ability and did not want the mortgage to cover his business liabilities. Mr. Barrow advised her that the cover was so limited. She expressed her gratitude to the bank for saving their home. The judge found that the bank was not seeking any advantage other than to provide on normal commercial terms

but at extremely short notice the bridging finance necessary to secure their home. He rejected the suggestion that Mrs. Morgan had any misgivings on the basis that she would prefer the house to be sold. He accepted that it was never the intention of Mr. Barrow that the charge should be used to secure any other liability of Mr. Morgan.

The atmosphere in the home during Mr. Barrow's visit was plainly tense. Mr. Morgan was in and out of the room, "hovering around." Mrs. Morgan made it clear to Mr. Barrow that she did not want him there. Mr. Barrow did manage to discuss the more delicate matters when he was out of the room.

Such was the interview in which it is said that Mr. Barrow crossed the line which divides a normal business relationship from one of undue influence. I am bound to say that the facts appear to me to be a far cry from a relationship of undue influence or from a transaction in which an unfair advantage was obtained by

one party over the other.

== Judgment ==
=== Court of Appeal ===
Dunn LJ held that manifest disadvantage was not a necessary ingredient of presumed undue influence, giving the example of a solicitor buying a client’s house. But there were no cases in which there was not a manifest disadvantage. Mrs Morgan did not fully consent to the charge.

=== House of Lords ===
The House of Lords held that ‘evidence that the transaction itself was wrongful in that it constituted an advantage taken of the person subjected to the influence’ was necessary. Moreover, there was no confidential relationship between the wife and the manager and it never went ‘beyond the normal business relationship of banker and customer’ so no presumption could arise.

Lord Scarman, who gave the only substantive judgment, said the following.

The fact of an unequal bargain will, of course, be a relevant feature in some cases of undue influence. But it can never become an appropriate basis of principle of an equitable doctrine which is concerned with transactions ‘not to be reasonably accounted for on the ground of friendship, relationship, charity, or other ordinary motives on which ordinary men act’ (Lindley L.J. in Allcard v Skinner, at p. 185). And even in the field of contract I question whether there is any need in the modern law to erect a general principle of relief against inequality of bargaining power. Parliament has undertaken the task – and it is essentially a legislative task – of enacting such restrictions upon freedom of contract as are in its judgment necessary to relieve against the mischief: for example, the hire-purchase and consumer protection legislation, of which the Supply of Goods (Implied Terms) Act 1973, Consumer Credit Act 1974, Consumer Safety Act 1978, Supply of Goods and Services Act 1982 and Insurance Companies Act 1982 are examples. I doubt whether the courts should assume the burden of formulating further restrictions.

The case was often cited as proposition that the House of Lords required "manifest disadvantage" in order to set aside a transaction for undue influence. See for example the comments of Slade LJ in Bank of Credit and Commerce International SA v Aboody [1992] 4 All ER 955. However, Lord Scarman did not say that directly, only that: "...I know of no reported authority where the transaction set aside was not to the manifest disadvantage of the person influenced." In CIBC Mortgages plc v Pitt [1994] 1 AC 200 Lord Browne-Wilkinson confirmed that Lord Scarman had not been seeking to lay down a general principle, and that manifest disadvantage was not required for cases of actual (as opposed to presumed) undue influence.

== Subsequent cases ==
Although Morgan has never been overruled or doubted, the law in this area has been largely superseded by the decision in Royal Bank of Scotland plc v Etridge (No 2) [2001] UKHL 44 (11 October 2001).

== See also ==
- English contract law
