= CTN Cash and Carry Ltd v Gallaher Ltd =

- Court: Court of Appeal
- Citations: [1993] EWCA Civ 19, [1994] 4 All ER 714

Case opinions
- Steyn LJ

Keywords
- Duress, commercial pressure

CTN Cash and Carry Ltd v Gallaher Ltd [1993] EWCA Civ 19 is an English contract law case relating to duress. It raised the question whether an act could be considered to be economic duress if the act would in any event be lawful.

== Facts ==
CTN Cash and Carry Ltd had a dispute with Gallaher Ltd about whether CTN should pay for some cigarettes that were delivered to the wrong warehouse and been stolen before Gallaher Ltd could pick them up again and take them to another warehouse. Gallaher believed that CTN was liable, because the risk of any had already passed, and threatened to withdraw CTN's credit facility for future dealings. They were entitled to do this for any reason. CTN paid. Later it was determined that the risk of the lost cigarettes was not on CTN and they sued for repayment.

== Judgment ==
Steyn LJ held that the threatened withdrawal of future credit was not duress, but he expressly refrained from saying there could never be "lawful act duress" in a commercial context. He said the move would be a "radical one with far-reaching implications… introduce a substantial and undesirable element of uncertainty in the commercial bargaining process." "It is an unattractive result, inasmuch as the defendants are allowed to retain a sum which at the trial they became aware was not in truth due to them. But in my view the law compels the result."

== See also ==
- English contract law
- Lloyds Bank Ltd v Bundy [1975] QB 326
- Williams v. Walker-Thomas Furniture Co. 350 F.2d 445 (C.A. D.C. 1965)
