= Fry v Lane =

Undue influence and exploitation

- Citation: (1888) 40 ChD 312, [1886-90] All ER Rep 1084

Case opinions
- Kay J

Keywords
- Undue influence

Fry v Lane (1888) 40 ChD 312 is an English contract law case relating to exploitation of weakness, allowing escape from a contract.

== Facts ==
JB and George Fry worked as a plumber and laundryman, earning £1 a week, and held the reversion of their uncle's estate, subject to the life tenancy of their aunt. They sold it in 1878 to Mr Lane for £170 and £270 respectively. They were advised by an inexperienced solicitor who also acted for Mr Lane. When the aunt died in 1886, the interests were each worth £730, and in 1878 it would have been £475.

== Judgment ==
Kay J cited two cases, Evans v Llewellin and Haygarth v Wearing, saying that equity most commonly interferes in favour of an expectant heir, in his youth, or "a poor man with imperfect education". Where such circumstances are shown, the onus is on the purchaser to show it was "fair, just and reasonable". The undervalue was "so gross as to amount of itself to evidence of fraud".

== See also ==
- English contract law
- Iniquitous pressure in English law
- Lloyds Bank Ltd v Bundy [1975] QB 326
- Williams v. Walker-Thomas Furniture Co. 350 F.2d 445 (C.A. D.C. 1965)
