= Pao On v Lau Yiu Long =

1979 Judicial Committee of the Privy Council case

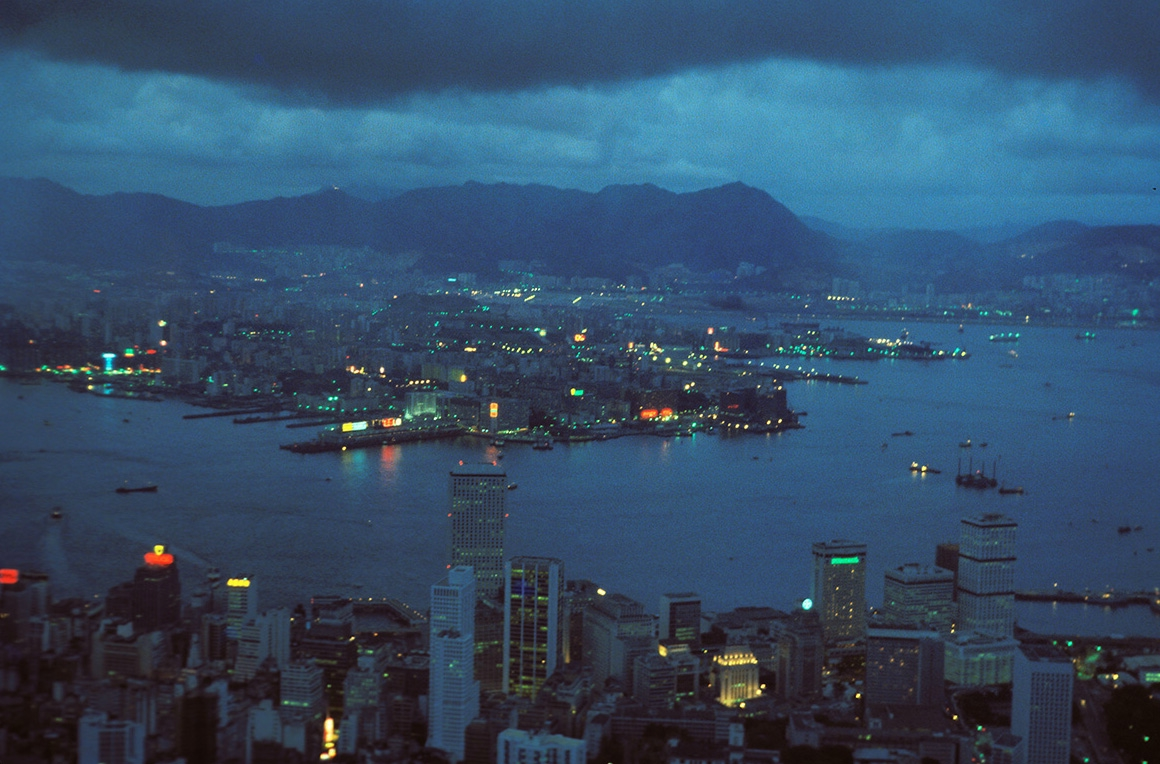
- Court: Privy Council
- Full case name: Pao On and others v. Lau Yiu Long and another
- Decided: 9 April 1979
- Citations: [1979] UKPC 17, [1980] AC 614, [1979] HKLR 225

Court membership
- Judges sitting: Lord Wilberforce, Viscount Dilhorne, Lord Simon of Glaisdale, Lord Salmon, Lord Scarman

Case opinions
- Lord Scarman

Keywords
- Consideration, economic duress, commercial pressure

Pao On v Lau Yiu Long [1979] UKPC 17 is a contract law appeal case from the Court of Appeal of Hong Kong decided by the Judicial Committee of the Privy Council, concerning consideration and duress. It is relevant for English contract law.

== Facts ==
Fu Chip Investment Co. Ltd., a newly formed public company, majority owned by Lau Yiu Long and his younger brother Benjamin (the defendants), wished to buy a 21-storey building then under construction called the "Wing On building", owned by Tsuen Wan Shing On Estate Co. Ltd. ("Shing On"), whose majority shareholder was Pao On and family (the claimants). Instead of simply selling the building for cash, Lau and Pao did a swap deal for the shares in their companies. Shing On would get 4.2m $1 shares in Fu Chip, and Fu Chip bought all the shares of Shing On. Fu Chip bought all the shares in Shing On, and Pao received as payment 4.2m shares in Fu Chip (worth $2.50 for each $1 share). To ensure the share price of Fu Chip suffered no shock, Pao agreed not to sell 60% of the shares for at least one year. Also, in the event that the share price dropped in that year, Lau agreed to buy 60% of the shares back from Pao at $2.50. But then Pao realised, if the share price rose over $2.50 in the year, the price would stay fixed and he would not get the gains. So he demanded that instead of that, Lau would merely indemnify Pao if the share price fell below $2.50. Pao made clear that unless he got this "guarantee agreement", he would not complete the main contract. It was signed on 4 May 1973, but as it turned out the shares did slump in value. Pao tried to enforce the guarantee agreement. Lau argued the guarantee agreement was not valid (1) because there was no consideration, only in the past and under a pre-existing duty, and (2) because it was a contract procured under duress.

== Judgment ==
Lord Scarman, giving the Privy Council's advice, first disposed of the question about past consideration, because a promise to perform a pre-existing contractual obligation to a third party can sometimes be good consideration. The question of whether consideration can be invalidated "if there has been a threat to repudiate a pre-existing contractual obligation or an unfair use of a dominating bargaining position" was rejected because "where businessmen are negotiating at arm's length it is unnecessary for the achievement of justice". On the idea of past consideration, Lord Scarman said this:

Their Lordships agree that the mere existence or recital of a prior request is not sufficient in itself to convert what is prima facie past consideration into sufficient consideration in law to support a promise: as they have indicated, it is only the first of three necessary preconditions. As for the second of those preconditions, whether the act done at the request of the promisor raises an implication of promised remuneration or other return is simply one of the construction of the words of the contract in the circumstances of its making. Once it is recognised, as the Board considers it inevitably must be, that the expressed consideration includes a reference to the Paos' promise not to sell the shares before the 30th April 1974—-a promise to be performed in the future, though given in the past-—it is not possible to treat the Laus' promise of indemnity as independent of the Paos' antecedent promise, given at Lau's request, not to sell. The promise of indemnity was given because at the time of the main agreement the parties intended that Lau should confer upon the Paos the benefit of his protection against a fall in price. When the subsidiary agreement was cancelled, all were well aware that the Paos were still to have the benefit of his protection as consideration for the restriction on selling. It matters not whether the indemnity thus given be regarded as the best evidence of the benefit intended to be conferred in return for the promise not to sell, or as the positive bargain which fixes the benefit on the faith of which the promise was given—though where, as here, the subject is a written contract, the better analysis is probably that of the "positive bargain". Their Lordships, therefore, accept the submission that the contract itself states a valid consideration for the promise of indemnity.

On the point of duress, Lord Scarman held the following.

There must be present some factor "which could in law be regarded as a coercion of his will so as to vitiate his consent". This conception is in line with what was said in this Board's decision in Barton v Armstrong [1976] AC 104, 121 by Lord Wilberforce and Lord Simon of Glaisdale - observations with which the majority judgment appears to be in agreement. In determining whether there was a coercion of will such that there was no true consent, it is material to inquire whether the person alleged to have been coerced did or did not protest; whether, at the time he was allegedly coerced into making the contract, he did or did not have an alternative course open to him such as an adequate legal remedy; whether he was independently advised; and whether after entering the contract he took steps to avoid it. All these matters are, as was recognised in Maskell v Horner [1915] 3 KB 106, relevant in determining whether he acted voluntarily or not.

This was commercial pressure and no more, since the company really just wanted to avoid adverse publicity. For a general doctrine of economic duress, it must be shown "the victim's consent to the contract was not a voluntary act on his part... provided always that the basis of such recognition is that it must amount to a coercion of will, which vitiates consent."

== See also ==
- Iniquitous pressure in English law
- Universe Tankships Inc of Monrovia v International Transport Workers' Federation [1982] 2 All ER 67
- Atlas Express Ltd. v. Kafco [1989] QB 833
- Lloyds Bank Limited v Bundy
