= Lloyds Bank Limited v Bundy =

English Court of Appeal case on contract law

Lloyds Bank Ltd. v Bundy
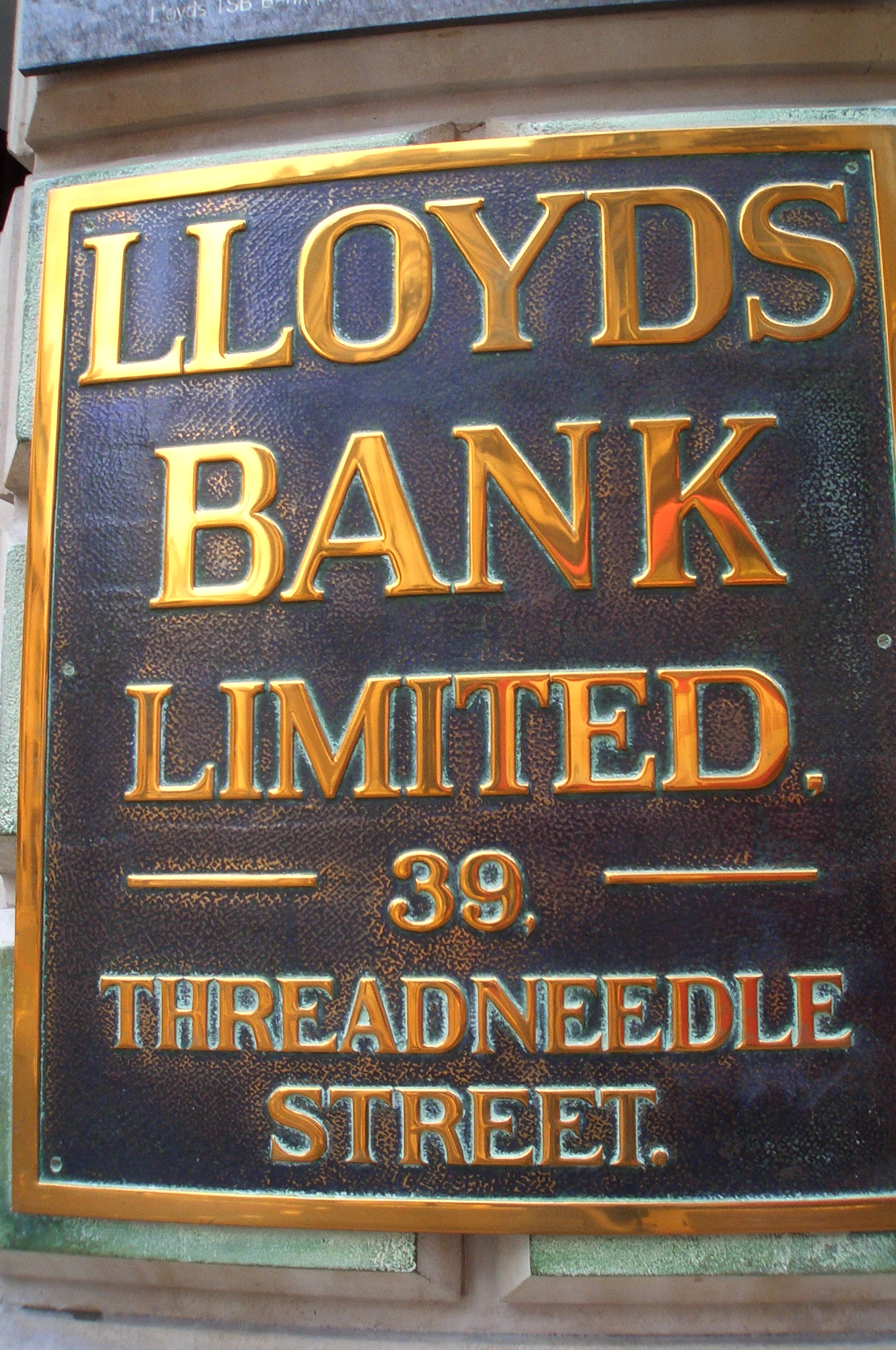
- Old address plaque for Lloyds Bank
- Court: English Court of Appeal
- Full case name: Lloyds Bank Limited and Herbert James Bundy
- Decided: July 30, 1974
- Citations: [1974] EWCA Civ 8, [1975] QB 326, [1974] 3 All ER 757

Case opinions
- Lord Denning MR, Sachs LJ, Cairns LJ

Keywords
- Undue influence in English law

Lloyds Bank Ltd v Bundy is a 1974 decision of the English Court of Appeal in English contract law, dealing with undue influence. One of the three judges hearing the case, Lord Denning MR, advanced the argument that under English law, all impairments of autonomy could be collected under a single principle of "inequality of bargaining power", but the other two judges were not drawn into commenting on Denning's argument.

== Facts ==
Herbert James Bundy was a farmer. His son, Michael, owned a business that was in financial trouble. Bundy had already guaranteed his son's business with a £7,500 charge over his only asset, his farmhouse, to Lloyds Bank. Michael's company got into further financial difficulty. Bundy then increased his exposure to £11,000 after the assistant manager of Lloyds failed to notify him of the company's true financial condition. Lloyds foreclosed on the house when the money was not paid. In the subsequent court proceedings, Bundy had a heart attack in the witness box. The question was whether the contract leading to the repossession of the house was voidable for some iniquitous pressure.

== Judgment ==
The case was heard by a three-judge panel of the English Court of Appeal: Lord Denning, Lord Justice Sachs, and Lord Justice Cairns. The Court unanimously agreed to set aside the trial judgment and give judgment in favour of Bundy, but for differing reasons. Sachs gave the majority decision, Cairns concurring. Denning gave separate reasons reaching the same conclusion. (As is the custom in English court cases, the judgments are given in order of seniority, not majority.)

=== Reasons of Denning ===
Denning held that the contract was voidable owing to the unequal bargaining position in which Bundy had found himself vis-à-vis the bank. He held that undue influence was a category of a wider class where the balance of power between the parties was such as to merit the interference of the court. It was apparent that Bundy had entered the contract without independent advice. Denning concluded it was very unfair and pressures were brought to bear by the bank.

Denning began by stating that the general rule is that a person who signs a contract must fulfill its terms. He then listed five exceptions to that general rule: (1) duress of goods; (2) unconscionable transaction; (3) undue influence; (4) undue pressure; (5) salvage agreements.

After summarising each of these in turn, he stated that there is a common thread running through all of them:

Gathering all together, I would suggest that through all these instances there runs a single thread. They rest on "inequality of bargaining power". By virtue of it, the English law gives relief to one who, without independent advice, enters into a contract upon terms which are very unfair or transfers property for a consideration which is grossly inadequate, when his bargaining power is grievously impaired by reason of his own needs or desires, or by his own ignorance or infirmity, coupled with undue influences or pressures brought to bear on him by or for the benefit of the other.

Denning then applied those principles to the facts of the case: (1) The consideration moving from the bank was grossly inadequate; (2) The relationship between the bank and the father was one of trust and confidence; (3) The relationship between the father and the son was one where the father's natural affection had much influence on him; (4) There was a conflict of interest between the bank and the father, but the bank did not realise it, nor suggest that the father should get independent advice.

Denning concluded that on those facts, the case had been made out for inequality of bargaining power, and would therefore allow the appeal.

=== Reasons of Sachs ===
Sachs held that a presumption of undue influence had not been rebutted, because Bundy was not independently advised. He had placed himself in the hands of the bank. He noted the bank's concession that "in the normal course of transactions by which a customer guarantees a third party's obligations, the relationship does not arise".

Sachs concluded that when the existence of a special relationship has been established, then a fiduciary duty arises. Here, the bank did not advise Bundy to get independent legal advice. Instead, the bank loans officer gave his own views on the son's business and advised Bundy to give the guarantee. That was a manifest breach of the duty to take fiduciary care: "then any possible use of the relevant influence is, irrespective of the intentions of the person possessing it, regarded in relation to the transaction under consideration as an abuse – unless and until the duty of fiduciary care has been shown to be fulfilled or the transaction is shown to be truly for the benefit of the person influenced."

Sachs commented that the counsel for the bank "urged in somewhat doom-laden terms" that banking practice would be seriously affected if the appeal were allowed, but Sachs dismissed that argument. He agreed the appeal should be allowed.

Sachs did not express an opinion on Denning's dicta.

=== Reasons of Cairns ===
Cairns concurred in allowing the appeal, for the reasons given by Sachs, stating that "the breach of the duty to take fiduciary care is manifest."

== Significance ==
As summarised by Beale, Bishop and Furmston, Denning envisaged four requirements. These were that a contract would be voidable if (1) the terms were very unfair or consideration inadequate (2) bargaining power was impaired by necessity, ignorance or infirmity (3) undue pressure or influence was used, not necessarily consciously, but by the pressurer, and (4) one of the parties did not receive independent legal advice. Of this last point, Denning stated that "I do not mean to suggest that every transaction is saved by independent advice. But the absence of it may be fatal." These requirements have not always been seen in a good light by the courts; in Pao On v Lau Yiu Long, Lord Scarman said that agreements were not voidable simply because "they had been procured by an unfair use of a dominant bargaining position", and in National Westminster Bank plc v Morgan Scarman directly refused to enforce Denning's principles, also asking if there was any need to them due to the statutory protection given to contractual parties by the Consumer Credit Act 1974.

Denning also wanted to apply the principle in other cases where (1) a contract was renegotiated, D&C Builders v Rees (2) a tort claim was settled, (3) an exemption clause in a cleaning contract was in standard form. The only limit was when the bargain was "the result of the ordinary interplay of forces".

== See also ==
- Iniquitous pressure in English law

=== Duress ===
- Barton v Armstrong [1976] AC 104
- D & C Builders Ltd v Rees [1966] 2 QB 617
- North Ocean Shipping Co Ltd v Hyundai Construction Co Ltd [1979] QB 705
- Pao On v Lau Yiu Long [1980] AC 614
- Universe Tankships Inc of Monrovia v International Transport Workers' Federation [1982] 2 All ER 67
- CTN Cash and Carry Ltd v Gallaher Ltd [1994] 4 All ER 714
- Atlas Express Ltd v Kafco [1989] QB 833

=== Undue influence ===
- BCCI v Aboody [1992] 4 All ER 955
- Barclays Bank plc v O'Brien [1993] 4 All ER 417
- Royal Bank of Scotland v Etridge (No 2) [2001] UKHL 41
- Tate v Williamson (1886) LR 2 Ch App 55

=== Unconscionability ===
- Fry v Lane (1888) 40 Ch D 312
- Cresswell v Potter [1978] 1 WLR 255
- The Medina (1876) 2 PD 5
- Alec Lobb Garages Ltd v Total Oil (GB) Ltd [1985] 1 WLR 173
