= Atlas Express Ltd. v Kafco =

English law case

- Court: High Court
- Full case name: Atlas Express v. Kafco (Importers & Distributors) Ltd.
- Citation: [1989] QB 833

Case opinions
- Tucker J

Keywords
- Duress

Atlas Express v Kafco (Importers & Distributors) Ltd. [1989] QB 833 is an English contract law case relating to duress.

== Facts ==
Kafco Ltd. had a contract to supply Woolworths with baskets. They had a ‘trading agreement’ with Atlas Express for at least six months to undertake the deliveries. Atlas Express realised it had underestimated the size of cartons to be carried, so it was costing more to deliver. Kafco would not vary the price. On 18 November 1986, Atlas sent an empty truck to Kafco, with a letter saying if a higher charge was not agreed to, the truck would leave empty. Kafco would go broke without the contract, so they "felt compelled to sign". Later, Kafco refused to pay, and argued there was economic duress, and also no new consideration.

Kafco also successfully argued that Atlas had given no consideration for its promise to pay more money on the basis that Atlas was merely performing an existing contractual duty (Stilk v Myrick (1809) 2 Camp 317).

== Judgment ==
Tucker J held there was economic duress in this situation, which meant the contract was voidable. When Kafco's Mr Armiger signed, he did so "unwillingly and under compulsion (...) He had no bargaining power. He did not regard it as a genuine arm's length re-negotiation in which he had a free and equal say and, in my judgement, that view was fully justified." Tucker J distinguished economic duress from "commercial pressure, which on any view is not sufficient to vitiate consent. The borderline between the two may in some cases be indistinct."

== See also ==
- English contract law
- Lloyds Bank Ltd. v. Bundy [1975] QB 326
- Williams v. Walker-Thomas Furniture Co. 350 F.2d 445 (C.A. D.C. 1965)
- Pao On v Lau Yiu Long
