= Royal Bank of Scotland plc v Etridge (No 2) =

2001 UK legal case

RBS plc v Etridge (No 2)
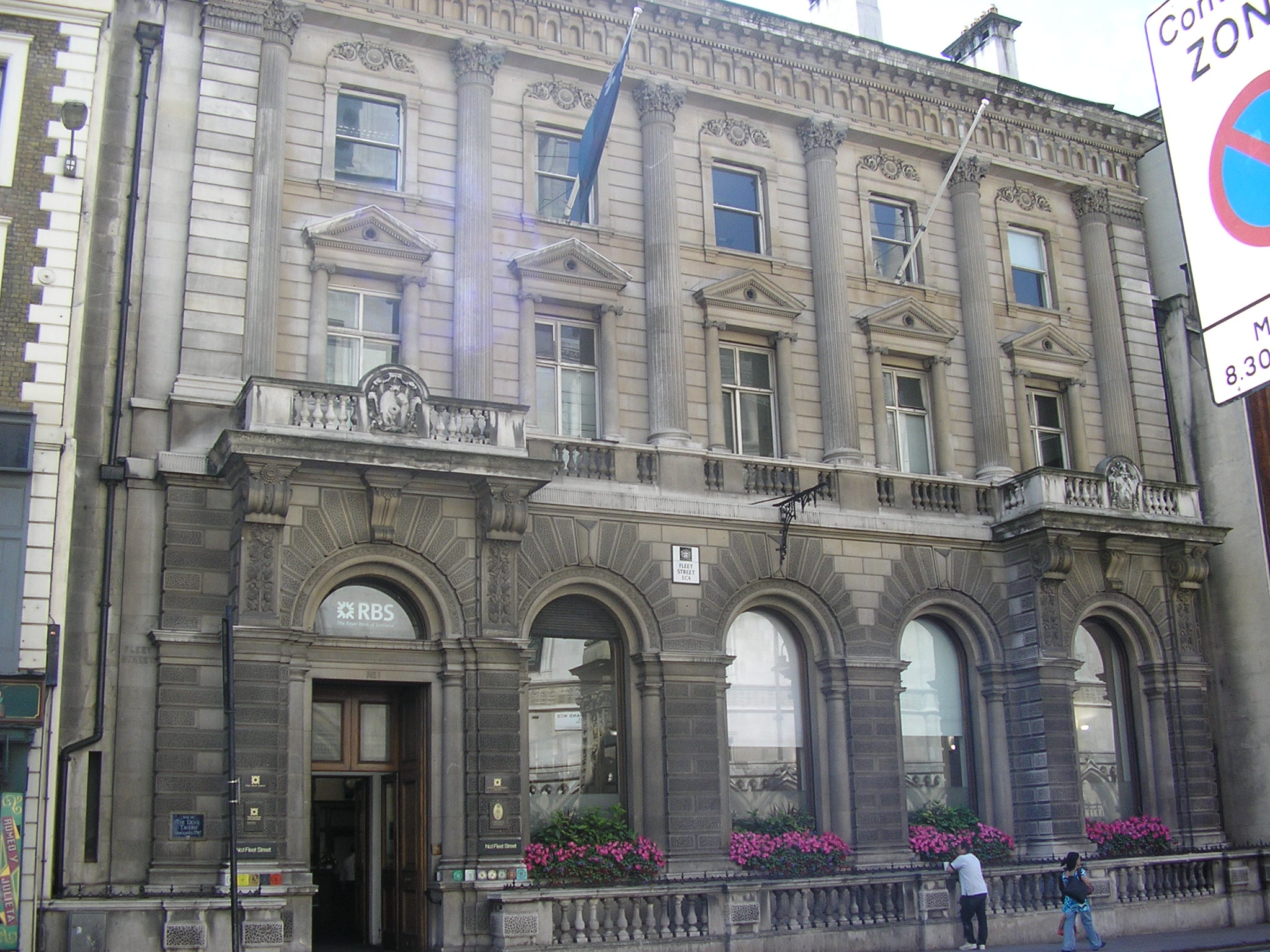
- Court: House of Lords
- Full case name: Royal Bank of Scotland Plc v Etridge (No.2), Barclays Bank Plc v Coleman, Barclays Bank Plc v Harris, Midland Bank Plc v Wallace, National Westminster Bank Plc v Gill, UCB Home Loans Corp Ltd v Moore, Bank of Scotland v Bennett, Kenyon-Brown v Desmond Banks & Co (Undue Influence) (No.2)
- Decided: 11 October 2001
- Citations: [2001] UKHL 44 [2002] 2 AC 773 [2001] 4 All ER 449 [2001] 3 WLR 1021 [2001] 2 All ER (Comm) 1061

Case history
- Prior actions: Immediate prior actions: Three appeals from pre-trial stage striking them out, five from High Court trial decision or Court of Appeal decision.
- Subsequent actions: Wallace and Harris interlocutory; arguable cases made out; ordered: wife could go to trial hearings as to the substantial evidence; Morris interlocutory; appeal wholly allowed (as no joint retainer etc.) no need for trial.

Case opinions
- Decision by: Lord Bingham of Cornhill; Lord Nicholls of Birkenhead; Lord Clyde; Lord Hobhouse of Woodborough; Lord Scott of Foscote

Keywords
- Undue influence, matrimonial home

Royal Bank of Scotland plc v Etridge (No 2) [2001] UKHL 44 (11 October 2001) is a leading case concerned with English land law, English contract law, and the circumstances under which actual and presumed undue influence can be argued to vitiate consent to a contract.

== Facts ==
In eight joined appeals, homeowners had mortgaged their property to a bank. In all cases, the mortgage was securing a loan that was used by a husband for his business, while his wife had not directly benefited. The businesses had failed, and the wife had alleged that she had been under undue influence to sign the security agreement. Therefore, it was contended that the security should be void over her share of the home's equity and that because of this the house could not be repossessed. In the eighth appeal the core of the action was between the wife and her solicitor (Mr Banks); the bank was not joined as a party.

== Judgment ==
The House of Lords held that for banks to have a valid security they must ensure that their customers have independent legal advice if they are in a couple where the loan will, based on constructive or actual knowledge (either suffices), be used solely for the benefit of one person. A bank (or its solicitor) is "put on inquiry" (fixed with constructive knowledge) that there may be the risk of undue influence or misrepresentation, if they transact for security over a domestic home, but the loan will only benefit one person and not the other. The solicitor who would give independent advice, however, could also be acting as a solicitor for the bank, or both a husband and wife (or either partner). The solicitor would certify that he or she was satisfied that both borrowers had given their fully informed and true consent, although if this ultimately turned out to be wrong, the bank's security would not be affected. Instead, the possibility of an action in professional negligence against the solicitor would arise. This would be a personal action, and so it would not help the family stay in their home. Lord Bingham gave the first judgment, remarking that the principles set down in the opinion of Lord Nicholls commanded "the unqualified support of all members of the House".

2. It is important that a wife (or anyone in a like position) should not charge her interest in the matrimonial home to secure the borrowing of her husband (or anyone in a like position) without fully understanding the nature and effect of the proposed transaction and that the decision is hers, to agree or not to agree. It is important that lenders should feel able to advance money, in run-of-the-mill cases with no abnormal features, on the security of the wife's interest in the matrimonial home in reasonable confidence that, if appropriate procedures have been followed in obtaining the security, it will be enforceable if the need for enforcement arises. The law must afford both parties a measure of protection. It cannot prescribe a code which will be proof against error, misunderstanding or mishap. But it can indicate minimum requirements which, if met, will reduce the risk of error, misunderstanding or mishap to an acceptable level. The paramount need in this important field is that these minimum requirements should be clear, simple and practically operable. 3. My Lords, in my respectful opinion these minimum requirements are clearly identified in the opinions of my noble and learned friends Lord Nicholls of Birkenhead and Lord Scott of Foscote. If these requirements are met the risk that a wife has been misled by her husband as to the facts of a proposed transaction should be eliminated or virtually so. The risk that a wife has been overborne or coerced by her husband will not be eliminated but will be reduced to a level which makes it proper for the lender to proceed.

Lord Nicholls held that if the banks ensured that the wife had had independent advice, they could not be responsible for that advice being defective. The presumption is rebutted if there is ‘expression of… free will’. The idea of manifest disadvantage for presumed undue influence was rejected but replaced (like the milder tone in Allcard v Skinner) with a transaction that ‘calls for explanation’, or one which ‘is not readily explicable by the relationship between the parties.’ In the ordinary case it is not ‘to be regarded as a transaction which, failing proof to the contrary, is explicable only on the basis that it has been procured by the exercise of undue influence.’ That is because it is nothing out of the ordinary. You are put on inquiry whenever a wife offers to stand as surety for her husband’s, or a company’s debts, where the loan is only going to be for the husband’s purposes. Once on inquiry, the bank must ensure that the spouse has independent advice and a certification that they have formed a truly independent judgment.

Lord Clyde gave a short judgment, followed by Lord Hobhouse who cast doubt on the utility of class 2B, identified in O'Brien. Lord Hobhouse summarised the outcomes of each claim.

123. Turning to the individual appeals, the cases fall into 3 different categories. There are three cases - Harris, Wallace and Moore - which have not got beyond the interlocutory stage, the wives' pleadings having been struck out as disclosing no defence to the banks' claims for possession. There are four cases - Etridge, Gill, Coleman and Bennett - which have proceeded to trial and in which, at trial and/or on appeal, the wife has been unsuccessful. Finally there is a single case - Kenyon-Brown - in which the wife was suing her solicitor for damages for breach of duty. Your Lordships are in favour of allowing the appeals in Kenyon-Brown, Harris, Wallace, Moore and Bennett: I agree. I also agree that the appeals in Etridge, Gill and Coleman should be dismissed. There is an important distinction to be drawn between cases which have been tried where the parties have been able to test the opposing case and the trial judge was able to make findings of fact having seen the critical witnesses and evaluated the evidence. By contrast, in those cases where the lender is applying for an immediate possession order without a trial or to have the defence struck out, the court is being asked to hold that, even if the wife's allegations of fact be accepted, the wife's case is hopeless and bound to fail and that there is no reason why the case should go to trial. This conclusion is not to be arrived at lightly nor should such an order be made simply on the basis that the lender is more likely to succeed. Once it is accepted that the wife has raised an arguable case that she was in fact the victim of undue influence and that the bank had been put on enquiry, it will have to be a very clear case before one can say that the bank should not have to justify its conduct at a trial.

Kenyon-Brown: 124. I take this case first because it falls into a different category to the others. The wife was claiming damages against a firm of solicitors on the basis that, under the undue influence of her husband, she had entered into an adverse suretyship transaction for the benefit of her husband, which also involved charging a cottage which they jointly owned, and that the solicitors had failed to give her appropriate advice to prevent this happening. The guarantee was unlimited. The wife was unable to give specific or reliable evidence in support of her case against the solicitors but relied upon the fact that the transaction was manifestly disadvantageous to her and upon the duty of the solicitor, as stated by the Court of Appeal in Etridge No2 [1998] 4 All ER 705 at para 19, to satisfy himself that she was free from improper influence. The certificate which the solicitor gave to the lender was that he had given her legal advice. In Kenyon-Brown, the majority of the Court of Appeal, in disagreement with the trial judge, considered that this led inexorably to the conclusion that the solicitor must have been negligent. I agree with your Lordships that the conclusion of the Court of Appeal was not justified upon the evidence adduced at the trial. The burden of proof was upon the wife to establish that the solicitor had been negligent. She could not say that she had not been given comprehensive advice which included a full warning of the consequences of her entering into the transaction. She could not contradict that he had told her specifically that the mortgage would only benefit her husband and was without limit. He was her solicitor and advised her as his client. The judge was right: she failed to make out her case against the solicitor on the facts. If she had been able to give reliable evidence and be clearer about what she said had happened and had been in a position to challenge the solicitor's attendance note, she might have succeeded. The solicitor's duty towards her was as stated by my noble and learned friend Lord Nicholls. It seems that it was substantially observed and in so far as the solicitor might be criticised, no causative relevance was established.

Wallace: 125. This was an interlocutory case. The bank claimed the possession of a flat in Priory Road, Hampstead, which was jointly owned by Mr and Mrs Wallace. The bank claimed possession on the basis of an all monies legal charge signed by the husband and the wife against which the bank had advanced money to the husband. It was accepted that she had an arguable case that she had been unduly influenced to sign by her husband. The bank did not at any stage communicate with the wife or anyone acting for her. It sent the charge to its own solicitor with instructions to attend to the necessary formalities in the signing of the charge. The husband and wife went together to the bank's solicitor's office. The wife's case was that she was there 3 or 4 minutes at most; she signed as directed by the solicitor; there was no other discussion; her impression was that the solicitor had been instructed by the bank merely to take and witness her signature. On this case the bank had no basis for rebutting the risk that her signature had not been properly obtained. It had no basis for any belief that she had been separately advised by a solicitor who was acting for her. The only solicitor of which the bank knew was a solicitor acting for itself alone which had in a side letter to the bank, of which the wife knew nothing, told the bank no more than that the documents had been explained. The wife clearly had an arguable case for defending the possession action. The reasoning of the Court of Appeal in arriving at the contrary conclusion was that the bank was (or, perhaps, would have been) entitled to assume that the solicitor had been acting as the wife's solicitor and had discharged his duty to her as her solicitor. As stated, this assumption would have been without foundation. I agree that this appeal should be allowed.

Harris: 126. This was also an interlocutory case. The judge struck out her defence and counterclaim as disclosing no arguable defence to the bank's action for the possession of the house owned jointly by the husband and wife where they lived. The husband had, through the medium of two companies, two businesses one of which had effectively failed leaving him with a heavy personal liability. He consulted solicitors, Wragge & Co, to find a way of carrying on his other business. They advised him to negotiate a new facility with the bank with new security. The outcome was an offer from the bank of new finance for the second company secured by unlimited guarantees from both the husband and wife and a legal charge on their house. The bank was clearly put on enquiry. It was accepted that for striking out purposes the wife had an arguable case on undue influence. The relevant question was therefore whether the bank took reasonable steps to satisfy itself that the wife's agreement had not been improperly obtained. Wragge & Co were only known to the bank as the husband's solicitors. The bank took no steps to communicate with the wife who was allowed to remain in ignorance of what precisely was the position between her husband and the bank. The wife was never told that she would be required to be separately advised nor that she should instruct a solicitor to certify to the bank that she had been so advised. In her pleading the wife had pleaded that the solicitors were acting for the bank, her husband and herself. However before the judge the affidavit sworn by her solicitor in the action (Mr Holt of Evans Derry Binnion) in response to the bank's striking out application deposed (para 6) -

"It is important to note that insofar as my client is concerned Wragge & Co were not her solicitors. Wragge & Co were solicitors who had been instructed by Mr Harris personally previously and he had a personal connection with one of the partners at that [firm]."

126. The wife therefore has an arguable case that Wragge & Co were never her solicitors and that the case is in this respect the same as the Wallace case. There is however a further feature of this case. The bank wrote to Wragge & Co, knowing them only as the husband's solicitors, asking them, among other things, "to explain the nature of the document to both parties and confirm to us that independent legal advice has been given". The letter in reply from Wragge & Co did not give the bank that confirmation, a fact which the bank did not pick up until about nine months later. The bank then wrote to Wragge & Co pointing this out and asking for confirmation that independent legal advice had nevertheless been given. On receiving this further letter, the partner at Wragge & Co commented: "I do not think that independent legal advice was given." On this, it would appear that the bank appreciated that it needed confirmation that the wife had been independently advised. Patently it did not get it. The bank realised that it had not got it and that she may well never have been independently advised. This was clearly a case where the judge should have allowed the case to go to trial. The wife had an arguable defence on more than one ground. The Court of Appeal dismissed the wife's appeal giving only brief reasons - "The solicitors were acting for Mrs Harris and the bank were entitled to assume that they had given appropriate advice and were entitled to accept the solicitors' letter as confirmation that this had been done." These reasons fly in the face of the evidence and cannot be supported. This appeal should be allowed.

Moore: 127. This is the third of the interlocutory cases. It is less clear cut than the other two. But it is not a case in which it should be said, in my judgment, that no trial is justified and that, on the basis of her pleaded case, the wife is bound to fail in her defence of the possession action. It is accepted for present purposes that she has an arguable case of undue influence and misrepresentation by her husband. Her case is that she had in fact instructed no solicitors to act for her and received no advice whatsoever. The charge was unlimited in amount. The loan transaction was not wholly straightforward in that, whilst it included the refinancing of indebtedness which was already secured on the matrimonial home in Pangbourne, it was as to 3/5ths composed of a substantial additional advance to the company run by the husband which was already in financial trouble (and was to fail within two years). In this connection, the company and the husband used an independent insurance broker, Mr Zerfahs and his brother (a credit broker), as a go-between with the lender. The lender had no direct communication with the wife, nor did Mr Zerfahs communicate with her. Were it not for one fact, this would be a case which fell into the same category as Wallace. The potential saving fact for the lender was that the husband had started his deception by persuading his wife to sign the mortgage application form in blank. One of the boxes in the form was "solicitor's details". The husband, who was the primary applicant, filled this in with the name of the solicitors who had been instructed by Mr Zerfahs without informing the wife or obtaining her authority: "Quiney & Harris (Nigel Whittaker)" and their address in Wootton Bassett near Swindon. As a result, on the face of the form sent to the lender there was a single solicitor who was to act on behalf of both applicants. The wife says that the husband had not obtained her authority to fill in the form in this way; it is agreed that the husband undoubtedly filled in other parts of the form fraudulently. Having received instructions from Mr Zerfahs, the solicitors, without obtaining confirmation from the wife, referred to her and her husband in correspondence as "our clients". The lender did not obtain any assurance that the wife had received independent advice before signing. It is the wife's case that she received no advice at all. This is a disturbing case. It may turn out (if there is a trial) that the wife is an unreliable witness and that her case cannot be accepted. But, for present purposes, the lender's case has to depend wholly upon an estoppel arising from her having signed the application form in blank and, it is argued, an inference that she had been separately advised as an independent client by the solicitor. I do not believe that this is a sound basis for disposing of this case without a trial. The true facts need to be known. She was the victim of misrepresentation; the solicitors purported to act on her behalf without any authority to do so; the only document which the lender saw did not suggest anything other than a joint retainer; the lender never checked the position with the wife or sought any confirmation that she was being separately advised. Discovery of documents and a morning in the County Court would have sorted the matter out more expeditiously and cheaply. I agree that this appeal should be allowed.

Royal Bank of Scotland v Etridge: 128. This is a case which, after some delay and contested interlocutory proceedings, went to a trial before Judge Behrens. The wife gave evidence. The judge found that, on the evidence, she had not been the victim of any actual undue influence. However he went on to deal with the case on the basis of presumed undue influence. On appeal, the Court of Appeal upheld the Judge's finding of no actual undue influence; nor did she at either level obtain a finding in her favour that she had been induced to sign by any misrepresentation. Accordingly, on the correct view of the law, her case failed in limine and none of the other points arose. Judgment was rightly entered for the bank. On this ground, I agree that this appeal should be dismissed. This case provides an object lesson in the dangers of attempting a summary resolution of issues of mixed law and fact without having ascertained the facts.

Gill: 129. This too is a case which went to trial. The evidence discloses what might have been a case of misrepresentation which possibly could have led to the wife succeeding. The transaction was presented in a fashion which may have led the wife and the solicitors mistakenly to believe that only an advance of £36,000 was involved, not a probable £100,000. However, be that as it may, the case advanced by the wife at the trial was that she had been the victim of actual undue influence. This case was rejected by the Judge and, in any event, there was evidence that the extended scope of the transaction is something which she would in fact have supported and was not causative. Therefore this case is, in the critical respect, similar to the Etridge case. She failed to prove the allegation necessary to found her case. I agree that this appeal should be dismissed.

Coleman: 130. In this case there was a trial which was not confined to a simple claim by the bank against the wife; it involved also her husband (who in addition counterclaimed against the bank) and third parties joined by the wife. With some reluctance I agree that the wife's appeal should be dismissed. This is not because of any inherent lack of merit in her case; she has been appallingly badly served. It is because to set aside the judgments entered against her below would be contrary to the grounds upon which her case was conducted at the trial and in the Court of Appeal. The wife and her husband were members of the Hasidic Jewish community. This factually involved a relationship of complete trust and confidence between the wife and her husband in relation to financial matters. I agree with Lord Scott that it is a case where, having drawn the appropriate inferences, actual undue influence was in fact established. The wife was being asked to charge her home to secure advances to her husband for the purpose of enabling him to engage in property speculation, he being unable to offer the bank adequate other security. It was also a case where the bank was clearly put on enquiry. The relevant point which should have been considered was therefore whether the bank took steps of the kind referred to by Lord Nicholls (para 79) (or in the National Westminster document) in order to protect itself from being affected by any such undue influence. But at the trial the dealings between the bank and the wife and the solicitor were not covered by documentary evidence and seem not to have been the subject of direct oral evidence either. The wife simply said that she went to the solicitor's office at the request of her husband and that all the managing clerk, whom they saw there, did before witnessing her signature was to ask her in the presence of her husband if he, her husband, had explained the documents to her. Her account (which the judge accepted) gives a pertinent reminder of the gap between theory and reality and illustrates the type of charade which, as Sir Peter Millett has observed (sup), lenders well know may occur and should not be tolerated or sanctioned by equity. However, at the trial, the wife's case was that the elderly solicitor for whom the managing clerk worked was acting as her solicitor. She joined what she thought were the appropriate persons as third parties suing them for breach of professional duty. The elderly solicitor had died. The trial judge dismissed her claim against the third parties holding that she had sued the wrong persons. There was a further unusual feature of the case. The bank had asked for a certificate in the unusual terms: "I confirm that this document was signed in my presence and that the full effect of its contents have been explained to and were understood by Miriam Mara Coleman, and she has signed this document of her own free will." (emphasis supplied.) It was this certificate that the managing clerk signed. If the bank were entitled to believe that this certificate was supplied by the wife's own solicitor instructed by her, the bank might have had a basis for believing that the wife's consent had been properly obtained. I venture to doubt whether any reasonable banker would have put this construction upon the available evidence but in view of the course of the proceedings before the trial judge and the basis upon which the wife's case was then put it would not be permissible now to allow this appeal upon an inconsistent and untested basis. The greater part of the time at the trial seems to have been taken up with the dispute between the husband and the bank. As between the wife and the bank, the judgments in the courts below were primarily concerned with aspects of the problem of presumed undue influence which do not now arise and with the question of the adequacy of a certificate signed by a legal executive as opposed to a solicitor which must depend on the facts of each case.

Bennett:

131. I agree that this appeal should be allowed. The existence of the ranking agreement was important and qualified the transaction as it was disclosed to the surety. I do not wish to add anything to what is to be said about this point by Lord Scott. This suffices for the allowing of the appeal. It is accordingly unnecessary to say anything about the undue influence issues.

Lord Scott gave a judgment dealing extensively with the particular facts of each claim.

== Significance ==
Outcomes differed among the eight fact patterns (cases) and three on very particular scenarios. As such the final appeals are reported together in law reports headed Etridge (or similar) but three reports detail endorsed dissents (with criteria/tests set) in the court below or go into further detail, as endorsed by the House of Lords:

- Barclays Bank plc v Coleman & Anor (2000) 3 WLR 405
- Bank of Scotland v Bennett (1999) 1 FLR 1115
- Kenyon-Brown v Desmond Banks & Co (2000) PNLR 266 on solicitor's advice where acting jointly - including Wilson J imposing Conditions lettered a) to i) in the Court of Appeal, accepted as correct in law in the House of Lords.

Appeals allowed

- Mrs Wallace
- Mrs Bennett
- Mrs Harris
- Mrs Moore
- Desmond Banks & Co (i.e. that solicitors' firm succeeded against the borrower)

Appeals dismissed

- Mrs Etridge
- Mrs Gill
- Mrs Coleman

== See also ==
- English contract law
- Iniquitous pressure in English law
- Lloyds Bank Ltd v Bundy [1975] QB 326
- Williams v. Walker-Thomas Furniture Co. 350 F.2d 445 (United States Court of Appeals for the District of Columbia Circuit, 1965)
