= Undue influence in English law =

"[T]o protect people from being forced, tricked or misled in any way by others into parting with their property is one of the most legitimate objects of all laws; and the equitable doctrine of undue influence has grown out of and been developed by the necessity of grappling with insidious forms of spiritual tyranny and the infinite varieties of fraud."
Allcard v Skinner (1877) LR 36 Ch D 145, per Lindley LJ

Undue influence in English law is a field of contract law and property law whereby a transaction may be set aside if it was procured by the influence exerted by one person on another, such that the transaction "ought not fairly to be as treated the expression of [that] person's free will".

Historically, the doctrine had predominantly been invoked where the person who is exercising undue influence over another person either enters into a contract with the affected person or receives a gift from them. However, much of the recent case law relates to three party cases, where one person (often a husband) exerts undue influence on a second person (the wife) to enter into a transaction (providing a guarantee or security for the husband's debts) with a third party (often a bank). The doctrine originally developed because of perceived limitations in the law relating to duress. Although the modern law is different, previously in order to set aside a contract for duress it was necessary to show a threat of violence to the person (this is now no longer the case), and the doctrine developed in response to more subtle forms of coercion. Accordingly, many earlier cases which refer to undue influence are capable of being reconsidered as actually relating to duress or unconscionable bargains in the modern sense.

The leading authority on undue influence is now the decision of the House of Lords in Royal Bank of Scotland v Etridge (No 2), but much of the earlier case law continues to be relevant. There has been no real statutory intervention in this area of the law. Despite the wide array of cases considering the doctrine, there remains some disagreement as to the precise ambit of the doctrine.

== Influence must be "undue" ==
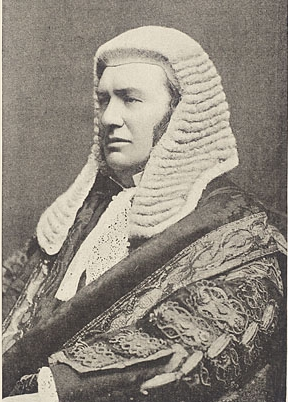
Lord Lindley, whose judgment in Allcard v Skinner set out the principal tenets of relief for undue influence.

In order to challenge a transaction as having been entered under undue influence. It is not sufficient to show that the person was influenced by another person; there must also be a degree of impropriety about the exercise of that influence.

However great the influence which one person may be able to wield over another equity does not intervene unless that influence has been abused. Equity does not save people from the consequences of their own folly; it acts to save them from being victimised by other people.

Although there have been rare cases where a transaction has been set aside even where the party exercising influence is seeking to act in the best interests of the person being influenced, and that all that is required is that the person's free will has been vitiated, the preponderance of authority notes that undue influence has a "connotation of impropriety" or requires "unconscionable conduct". In Allcard v Skinner (1877) LR 36 Ch D 145 Lindley LJ said:

What then is the principle? Is it that it is right and expedient to save persons from the consequences of their own folly? or is it that it is right and expedient to save them from being victimised by other people? In my opinion the doctrine of undue influence is founded on the second of these two principles. Courts of equity have never set aside gifts on the ground of the folly, imprudence, or want of foresight on the part of donors. ... On the other hand, to protect people from being forced, tricked or misled in any way by others into parting with their property is one of the most legitimate objects of all laws; and the equitable doctrine of undue influence has grown out of and been developed by the necessity of grappling with insidious forms of spiritual tyranny and the infinite varieties of fraud.

However other cases have struck a very different tone. In Pesticcio v Huet [2004] EWCA Civ 372 Mummery LJ said:

Although undue influence is sometimes described as an "equitable wrong" or even as a species of equitable fraud, the basis of the court's intervention is not the commission of a dishonest or wrongful act by the defendant, but that, as a matter of public policy, the presumed influence arising from the relationship of trust and confidence should not operate to the disadvantage of the victim if the transaction is not satisfactorily explained by ordinary motives.

Chitty on Contracts suggests that the different approaches may be reconciled by taking into account the nature of the transaction. If the transaction is obviously one-sided such as outright gift (particularly to the person exercising influence), and especially if it will have a serious effect on the victim like leaving them with limited resources, where there is a relationship of trust and confidence between the parties, the courts will presume that the influence was undue. But this will not normally be so where the transaction is to the advantage of the person who was influenced; where a wife simply signed what is put in front of her by her husband his influence was held not to be undue where at the time the transaction appeared to be to her advantage. However, in either case it seems that it makes no difference whether the person exercising the influence obtains any personal benefit or not.

== Undue influence ==
More recent case law has sought to divide undue influence into two (or three) separate sub-groups: (1) actual undue influence, and (2) presumed undue influence. In Barclays Bank plc v O'Brien [1993] UKHL 6 Lord Browne-Wilkinson tried to further sub-divide presumed undue influence into two further categories: (2A) where the courts would presume, solely based upon the nature of the relationship, that the relationship is one with sufficiently significant influence in the form of trust and confidence or ascendancy and dependence, and (2B) relationships where the courts would not presume such influence. Treitel on the Law of Contracts has criticised the labelling as "potentially misleading". Both academic commentators and the courts have been skeptical as to the value of Class 2B relationships, and whether an evidential presumption is of assistance. In Royal Bank of Scotland v Etridge (No 2) Lord Hobhouse and Lord Hodge appeared to reject the Class 2B category, and Lord Clyde questioned "the wisdom ... of attempting to make classifications of cases of undue influence."

=== Actual undue influence ===
Most of the early cases relating to the development of the doctrine of undue influence related to actual pressure which was brought to bear on the victim, but which fell short of the legal requirements for duress. Many of these cases would now be treated as duress. For example, in Williams v Bayley (1886) LR 1 HL 200, Bayley's son forged his father's signature on promissory notes and gave them to Williams. Williams threatened Bayley with criminal prosecution, so Bayley made an equitable mortgage to get back the notes. The court set aside the mortgage, and expressed itself as doing so for reasons of undue influence; today the case would almost certainly have been treated as duress. For undue influence the equitable concept of "pressure" is much wider than for duress. Actual undue influence does not require the making of any threat.

In cases of actual undue influence, the party who claims relief must show that such influence existed and was exercised, and that as a result no independent judgment on the transaction could be formed. However, it is not necessary to show that the transaction was either manifestly disadvantageous, or that it called for explanation.

=== Presumed undue influence ===
Apart from cases of actual undue influence, equity may also give relief where a party is in relationship which gives rise to a presumption of undue influence. The sub-division of presumed undue influence based upon a relationship into two further sub-categories as discussed above remains controversial, but most academics continue to use the categorisation for discussion purposes.

==== Class 2A ====
In Lord Browne-Wilkinson's speech in O'Brien, he referred to "Class 2A" as relationships of presumed trust and confidence. In those specific relationships "the law presumes, irrebuttably, that [one person] had influence over [the victim]". Note that it is not an evidential presumption, but an irrebuttable one. Accordingly, irrespective of the true facts, the courts will presume that the one person had influence over the other. However, the presumption that the transaction was procured by that influence may be rebutted.

The categories of relationships which have been recognised as relationships of presumed trust and confidence include:

- parent and child;
- guardian and ward;
- religious adviser and disciple;
- doctor and patient;
- solicitor and client;
- trustee and beneficiary; and
- fiancé and fiancée.

Note however that it does not apply to spouses and partners, whether heterosexual or homosexual, and this state of affairs has been criticised as anomalous and arbitrary. Nor does it apply as between employer and employee.

==== Class 2B ====
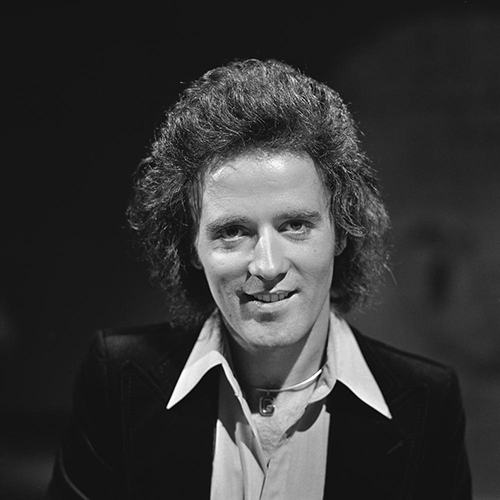
Gilbert O'Sullivan claimed undue influence in O'Sullivan v Management Agency & Music Ltd [1985] QB 428.

Where a relationship exists which does not fall into Class 2A above, but in which it is established that one person did in fact place trust and confidence in another, then the courts may apply a lesser evidential presumption that the transaction was procured by that influence. This presumption may be rebutted.

Most of the cases arise where one person had entrusted another with the management of their financial affairs. In O'Sullivan v Management Agency & Music Ltd [1985] QB 428, the musician and composer Gilbert O'Sullivan successfully set aside agreements he had entered into with his manager when he was a young aspiring musician. In Tate v Williamson (1886) LR 2 Ch App 55 where a young Oxford University student sold his estate to his financial adviser for half its value, the court set aside the sale. In that case, Lord Chelmsford noted that "The courts have always been careful not to fetter this jurisdiction by defining the exact limits of its exercise." As noted above, in much the same vein in Etridge the majority of the House of Lords seem to doubt the efficacy of having a Class 2B at all, and seemed to prefer such cases to be decided on general principles without the benefit of evidential presumptions.

== Causation ==
A person seeking to set aside a transaction for undue influence only needs to establish that the undue influence was a factor. They do not need to establish that it was the only, or even principal reason that the transaction was entered into. The Court of Appeal had held in BCCI v Aboody [1992] 4 All ER 955 that the person seeking to set aside the transaction would have to satisfy the "but for" test and show that without the influence they would not have entered into the transaction; however that decision was overruled in UCB Corporate Services v Williams [2002] EWCA Civ 555. Treitel on the Law of Contract notes that whilst this brings the law of undue influence into line with law on duress and fraudulent misrepresentation, it does mean that "the burden is on the stronger party to show that any undue influence played no part at all."

== Consequences ==
A transaction which is shown to have been entered into as a result of undue influence will be voidable, and not automatically void. The victim has the right to rescind the transaction, but if they have received any benefits under the transaction, the right to rescind is conditional upon making restitution of those benefits. However, the right to rescind may be lost in four ways:

- Affirmation. The right of a victim to rescind may be lost by affirmation of the transaction, acquiescence or estoppel.
- Impossibility of restoring the parties. Normally a party will not be allowed to rescind a contract unless the parties can all be restored to their prior positions. However, in undue influence cases, parties have been allowed to rescind contracts where precise restitution is not possible, but the courts can obtain a result which is "practically just", usually by payment of a money equivalent.
- Delay. The victim of undue influence must "seek relief within a reasonable time after the removal of the influence".
- Third party rights. Although normally the right to rescind is lost when an innocent third party acquires an interest in the subject matter, this general rule becomes more complicated in relation to cases of undue influence. The courts previously talked about whether the third party had "constructive notice" of the influence, although more recent cases talk about them being "put on enquiry". This is discussed in more detail below.

Although parties cannot claim damages for undue influence, the courts have held that where rescission is not possible, victims may be entitled to "equitable compensation", which in practice will amount to much the same thing.

== Notice ==
The position that the courts have reached is that when a third party (i.e. the bank) is put on inquiry as to potential undue influence, they must communicate to the person who may have been unduly influenced (i.e. the wife) that they require a solicitor acting for the wife (who may also act for the bank) to confirm to the bank in writing that the solicitor has explained to the wife the nature and effect of the documents to be signed by the wife, and that this must be done in a face-to-face meeting in the absence of the person who might exercise undue influence over her (i.e. the husband). If those steps are taken then the bank is entitled to rely upon the confirmation from the solicitor that the wife has been advised appropriately.
Summary of Royal Bank of Scotland plc v Etridge (No 2) [2001] UKHL 44 at [74] to [79]

Complications can arise where the transaction was entered into by the victim of undue influence with a third party (as opposed to with the person who exercised undue influence). By far the most common examples of this in the case law seem to be where a wife has either given a guarantee or granted security over the matrimonial home to support the business debts of her husband, and it is alleged that the husband has exercised undue influence over the wife to persuade her to enter into the arrangement. The courts will not presume undue influence into the husband/wife relationship. However, undue influence may be proved either as actual undue influence, or by establishing that the relationship was one in which the wife reposed trust and confidence in the husband to manage the financial affairs.

Generally speaking, where a person seeks equitable relief (such as rescission) against a third party, then under ordinary equitable principles the third party must have had some kind of notice of the facts. Otherwise as an innocent third party, it would entitled to act in good faith and rely upon its rights. However, in relation to the doctrine of undue influence the courts have taken a softer line than in other equitable doctrines. Before Royal Bank of Scotland v Etridge (No 2), the position in relation to undue influence was more orthodox - it would be necessary to establish that the third party had "constructive notice" of the circumstances that vitiated the consent of the affected person. Instead, the House of Lords said, the preferred language should be whether the third party (i.e. the bank) had been "put on inquiry", and further that "a bank is put on inquiry whenever a wife offers to stand surety for her husband's debts", although not for a joint loan which is understood to be used for their joint purposes.

If a third party is put on inquiry for these or other reasons, then they are under a duty to take reasonable care to protect the person with whom they are dealing from undue influence. In recent case law the courts have spent considerable time trying to juggle how far to extend that duty of the third party to protect the person they are dealing with, with the countervailing policy consideration that family homes are an important source of collateral for people who wish to start their own business or otherwise raise finance. No shortage of criticism (from both sides of the argument) has been directed at the judiciary. The position that the courts have reached is that the third party (i.e. the bank) must communicate to the person who may have been unduly influenced (i.e. the wife) that they require a solicitor acting for the wife (who may also act for the bank) to confirm to the bank in writing that the solicitor has explained to the wife the nature and effect of the documents to be signed by the wife, and that this must be done in a face-to-face meeting in the absence of the person who might exercise undue influence over her (i.e. the husband). If those steps are taken then the bank is entitled to rely upon the confirmation from the solicitor that the wife has been advised appropriately.

== Independent legal advice ==
The approach of the courts has been to try to push the responsibility for protecting spouses and other vulnerable parties onto solicitors, but in a way which is not unduly onerous and permits the use of the family home as a source of capital. Questions have been raised about how effective this really is in protecting vulnerable wives.

The quality and effectiveness of that advice is not strictly patrolled. The solicitor must explain the transaction, but he has no power to veto it if the wife insists she has blind faith in her husband and wishes to press ahead. But the solicitor may have a duty to advise the client not to proceed with the transaction.

The solicitor does not discharge his duty by satisfying himself simply that the [vulnerable person] understands and wishes to carry out the particular transaction. He must also satisfy himself that the [transaction] is one which it is right and proper for the [vulnerable person] to make under all the circumstances, and if he is not so satisfied, his duty is to advise his client not to go on with the transaction, and to refuse to act further for him if he persists.

This was echoed in Coomber v Coomber:

All that is necessary is that some independent person, free from any taint of the relationship, or of the consideration of the interest which would affect the act, should put clearly before the person what are the nature and the consequences of the act. It is for adult persons of competent mind to decide whether they will do an act, and I do not think that independent and competent advice means independent and competent approval. It simply means that the advice shall be removed entirely from the suspected atmosphere; and that from the clear language of an independent mind, they should not precisely what they are doing.

The House of Lords in Etridge stated that if it is "glaringly obvious that the wife is being grievously wronged" the solicitor should decline to act. However, if the solicitor does not do so, it seems that the bank is still protected (although the solicitor may be potentially liable). Even if the transaction is one that "no competent solicitor could have advised the wife to enter" the bank is still protected.

However, if the solicitor did not have all the necessary information to advise the vulnerable party properly, then the transaction may still be set aside.

== Conflict of laws ==
Coercion and undue influence are treated as matters of public policy by the English courts. Accordingly, even where a contract is governed by a foreign law, and the contract would be valid under that foreign law, the English courts will still retain jurisdiction to set the contract aside for duress or undue influence.

== See also ==
- English contract law
- English unjust enrichment law
- Duress (contract law)
- Undue influence
