= The Medina =

English contract law case

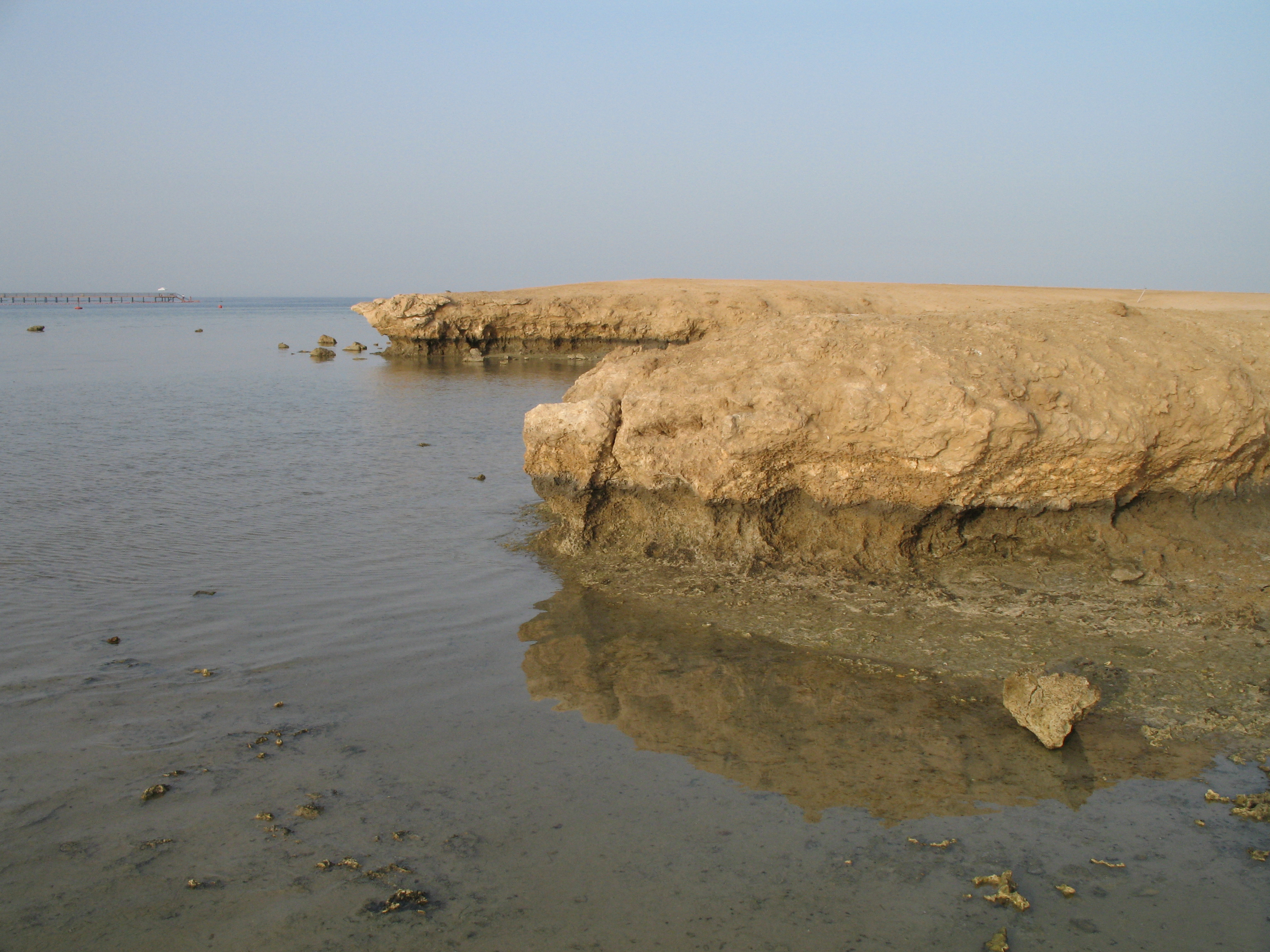
- Red Sea coast near Port Ghalib, Egypt
- Court: Court of Appeal
- Citation: (1876) 2 PD 5

Keywords
- Exploitation, restitution

The Medina (1876) 2 PD 5 is an English contract law case, regarding the voidability of an agreement and a restitutionary award where the court finds that agreement is procured under extortionate circumstances.

== Facts ==
On a voyage from Singapore to Jeddah, The Medina hit Parkin Rock, part of the Hanish Islands in the Red Sea, and was wrecked. It had 550 pilgrims on board, who were taken by lifeboats to the rocks. The Timor answered a distress signal but refused to take the refugees to Jedda unless the master of The Medina paid £4,000. The master agreed. But when they were safe, the master refused to pay. The captain of The Timor claimed the money in court.

== Judgment ==
The Court of Appeal held that the £4,000 was excessive, and so only £1,800 would be awarded.

James LJ said it was ‘a very exorbitant sum for only a few days’ work… having regard to the particular circumstances, that pressure was exercised’.

Baggallay JA said it was ‘very large in comparison with the services rendered’ leading ‘to the conclusion that there may have been some unfair dealing’. The ‘captain of the Medina was bound to accept any terms which were pressed upon him by the Timor.

Brett JA said the standard rule is that,

where there is an agreement made by competent persons and there is no misrepresentation of facts, the agreement ought to be upheld, unless there is something very strong to shew that it is inequitable.

Promising to pay when there are 550 stranded people was "compulsion to the mind of any honest man".

== See also ==
- Boardman v Phipps
- Alec Lobb Garages Ltd v Total Oil (GB) Ltd [1985] 1 WLR 173
- Interfoto v Stiletto
