= James Clyde, Baron Clyde =

Scottish judge

The Right Honourable The Lord Clyde PC

Member of the House of Lords
- Lord Temporal
- Lord of Appeal in Ordinary; 1 October 1996 – 6 March 2009

Personal details
- Born: 29 January 1932 Edinburgh
- Died: 6 March 2009 (aged 77)

James John Clyde, Baron Clyde, PC (29 January 1932 – 6 March 2009) was a Scottish judge.

== Biography ==
James John Clyde was born in Edinburgh on 29 January 1932 the only son and youngest child of Margaret Letitia (1901–1974), (daughter of Arthur Edmund DuBuisson), and James Latham McDiarmid Clyde, (later Lord Clyde (1898–1975). He was grandson of James Avon Clyde, Lord Clyde.

He attended Edinburgh Academy. In 1954 he graduated with a BA Literae Humaniores from Corpus Christi College, Oxford, and from the University of Edinburgh, graduating with a Bachelor of Laws in 1959.

Clyde served in the Intelligence Corps from 1954 to 1956, and was admitted to the Faculty of Advocates in 1959. In 1971, he became a Queen's Counsel (Scotland) and was advocate-depute from 1973 to 1974. In 1972, he was made Chancellor to the Bishop of Argyll, and in 1979 Judge of the Courts of Appeal of Jersey and Guernsey, holding both posts until 1985. Between 1985 and 1996, Clyde was Senator of the College of Justice (with the judicial courtesy title of Lord Clyde), and in 1996 he was elected Honorary Master of the Bench of the Middle Temple. From 2003 to 2006, he was a member of the Justice Oversight Commission (Northern Ireland).

Clyde was Director of Edinburgh Academy from 1979 to 1988 and vice-president of the Royal Blind Asylum and School from 1987 until his death. He was Hon. President of the Scottish Young Lawyers' Association between 1988 and 1997, Governor of the Napier Polytechnic and University between 1989 and 1993, and assessor to the Chancellor of the University of Edinburgh between 1989 and 1997. He chaired the 1992 Orkney child abuse inquiry.

Clyde received an Honorary Doctorate from Heriot-Watt University in 1991.

On 1 October 1996, he was appointed Lord of Appeal in Ordinary and additionally was created a life peer with the title Baron Clyde, of Briglands in Perthshire and Kinross. In the same year he was invested as a Privy Counsellor. He retired as a Lord of Appeal in Ordinary in 2001.

Lord Clyde married Ann Clunie Hoblyn in 1963; they had two sons. Lady Clyde died in 2020.

== Arms ==
Coat of arms of James Clyde, Baron Clyde
Crest Issuant from a Mount Vert a Tree with three Branches, one of Mountain Ash, one of Beech and one of Cherry proper Escutcheon Per fess Argent and Azure a Fess wavy per fess wavy Azure and Argent two Bushes upon Mounds Vert in chief and a Tower Or Window and Port Gules in base Supporters Dexter: The figure of Justice without blindfold and holding in her exterior hand a Pair of Scales all proper; Sinister: The figure of Apollo holding in his exterior hand a Lyre all proper Motto (over the Crest) Diligens integer laetus (Hard-working, honourable, happy)
