= Allcard v Skinner =

- Court: Court of Appeal
- Citation: (1887) 36 Ch D 145

Case opinions
- Bowen, Cotton and Lindley LJJ

Keywords
- Undue influence

Allcard v Skinner (1887) 36 Ch D 145 is a judicial decision under English law dealing with undue influence.

== Facts ==
Miss Allcard was introduced by the Revd Mr Nihill to Miss Skinner, a lady superior of a Protestant religious order named "Sisters of the Poor". She had to observe vows of poverty and obedience. Three days after becoming a member, Miss Allcard made a will bequeathing all property to Miss Skinner, and passed on railway stock that she came into possession of in 1872 and 1874. She then claimed the money back after she left the sisterhood.

== Judgment ==
Lindley LJ, held that she was unduly influenced but barred by laches from getting restitution. And in any case she would only have been able to recover as much of the gift as remained in the defendant’s hands after some of it had been spent in accordance with her wishes.

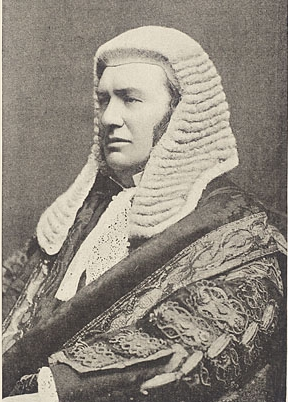
Lord Lindley.

What then is the principle? Is it that it is right and expedient to save persons from the consequences of their own folly? or is it that it is right and expedient to save them from being victimised by other people? In my opinion the doctrine of undue influence is founded upon the second of these two principles. Courts of Equity have never set aside gifts on the ground of the folly, imprudence, or want of foresight on the part of donors. The Courts have always repudiated any such jurisdiction. Huguenin v Baseley 14 Ves 273 is itself a clear authority to this effect. It would obviously be to encourage folly, recklessness, extravagance and vice if persons could get back property which they foolishly made away with, whether by giving it to charitable institutions or by bestowing it on less worthy objects. On the other hand, to protect people from being forced, tricked or misled in any way by others into parting with their property is one of the most legitimate objects of all laws; and the equitable doctrine of undue influence has grown out of and been developed by the necessity of grappling with insidious forms of spiritual tyranny and with the infinite varieties of fraud.

Cotton LJ said,

First where the court has been satisfied that the gift was the result of influence expressly used by the donee for the purpose; second, where the relations between the donor and donee have at or shortly before the execution of the gift been such as to raise a presumption that the donee had influence over the donor.

== See also ==
- Restitution in English law
