= Williams v. Walker-Thomas Furniture Co. =

1965 American court case

- Court: United States Court of Appeals for the District of Columbia Circuit
- Full case name: Ora Lee WILLIAMS, Appellant, v. WALKER-THOMAS FURNITURE COMPANY, Appellee.
- Citation: 350 F.2d 445 (D.C. Cir. 1965)
- Transcript

Case opinions
- J. Skelly Wright

Keywords
- Unconscionability

Williams v. Walker-Thomas Furniture Co., 350 F.2d 445 (D.C. Cir. 1965), was a court opinion, written by Judge J. Skelly Wright, that had a definitive discussion of unconscionability as a defense to enforcement of contracts in American contract law. As a staple of first-year law school contract law courses, it has been briefed extensively.

It flows from interpretation of the Uniform Commercial Code § 2-302 (1954) and is relevant for the Restatement (Second) of Contracts § 208.

== Facts ==
The case involved Walker-Thomas Furniture Company (Washington, D.C. at 7th St. & L St. NW) extending credit to Williams for a series of furniture purchases made between 1957 and 1962. Williams had been paying monthly installments for several years, before finally defaulting on a payment after purchasing a stereo. The contract that Williams had signed with Walker-Thomas stipulated that the purchaser cannot own any item until their entire balance has been paid off. When Williams defaulted on the contract in 1962, Walker-Thomas then tried to repossess all the furniture that Williams had purchased since 1957. The U.S. Court of Appeals for the District of Columbia Circuit ruled that the lower court could rule the contract unconscionable and refuse to enforce it, and returned the case to the lower court to decide whether or not the contract was in fact unconscionable.

== Judgment ==
J. Skelly Wright held that the case needed to be sent back to trial to determine further facts, but in doing so, he held that a contract may be set aside if it was procured by unconscionable means.

...we hold that where the element of unconscionability is present at the time a contract is made, the contract should not be enforced ...

Unconscionability has generally been recognized to include an absence of meaningful choice on the part of one of the parties together with contract terms which are unreasonably favorable to the other party....

In many cases the meaningfulness of the choice is negated by a gross inequality of bargaining power ...

The manner in which the contract was entered is also relevant to this consideration. Did each party to the contract, considering his obvious education or lack of it, have a reasonable opportunity to understand the terms of the contract, or were the important terms hidden in a maze of fine print and minimized by deceptive sales practices? Ordinarily, one who signs an agreement without full knowledge of its terms might be held to assume the risk that he has entered a one-sided bargain. But when a party of little bargaining power, and hence little real choice, signs a commercially unreasonable contract with little or no knowledge of its terms, it is hardly likely that his consent, or even an objective manifestation of his consent, was ever given to all the terms. In such a case the usual rule that the terms of the agreement are not to be questioned should be abandoned and the court should consider whether the terms of the contract are so unfair that enforcement should be withheld.

== Significance ==
This case is often used by legal professors in the United States to question their students' ideology or presumptions. It is also used as a case study in some modern economics classes.

== See also ==
- Lloyds Bank Ltd v Bundy
- Tunkl v. Regents of the University of California, 60 Cal 2d 92, 383 P2d 441 (1963) (Mr. Tunkl's wife sued for damages after her husband was admitted to a charitable hospital after signing a waiver for any negligence and died in the course of an operation. Tobriner J held that the exemption was invalid on the ground that Mr. Tunkl has far inferior bargaining power.)
