= Corporate litigation in the United Kingdom =

Corporate litigation in the United Kingdom is that part of UK company law which gives investors the right to sue the directors of a company, or vindicate another wrong to the company, particularly where the board of directors does not wish to act itself.

== History ==
Litigation among those within a company has historically been very restricted in UK law. The attitude of courts favoured non-interference. As Lord Eldon said in the old case of Carlen v Drury, "This Court is not required on every Occasion to take the Management of every Playhouse and Brewhouse in the Kingdom." If there were disagreements between the directors and shareholders about whether to pursue a claim, this was thought to be a question best left for the rules of internal management in a company's constitution, since litigation could legitimately be seen as costly or distracting from doing the company's real business. (etc)

=== The rule in Foss v Harbottle ===
The board of directors invariably holds the right to sue in the company's name as a general power of management. So if wrongs were alleged to have been done to the company, the principle from the case of Foss v Harbottle, was that the company itself was the proper claimant, and it followed that as a general rule that only the board could bring claims in court. A majority of shareholders would also have the default right to start litigation, but the interest a minority shareholder had was seen as relative to the wishes of the majority. Aggrieved minorities could not, in general, sue. Only if the alleged wrongdoers were themselves in control, as directors or majority shareholder, would the courts allow an exception for a minority shareholder to derive the right from the company to launch a claim.

In practice very few derivative claims were successfully brought, given the complexity and narrowness in the exceptions to the rule in Foss v Harbottle. This was witnessed by the fact that successful cases on directors' duties before the Companies Act 2006 seldom involved minority shareholders, rather than a new board, or a liquidator in the shoes of an insolvent company, suing former directors.

== Derivative claim ==
Derivative claims are used by shareholders against directors alleged to have breached their duties of care or loyalty, exemplified in current litigation against BP executives for losses connected to the Deepwater Horizon oil spill catastrophe.

The new requirements to bring a "derivative claim" are now codified in the Companies Act 2006 sections 261-264. Section 260 stipulates that such actions are concerned with suing directors for breach of a duty owed to the company. Under section 261 a shareholder must, first, show the court there is a good prima facie case to be made. This preliminary legal question is followed by the substantive questions in section 263. The court must refuse permission for the claim if the alleged breach has already been validly authorised or ratified by disinterested shareholders, or if it appears that allowing litigation would undermine the company's success by the criteria laid out in section 172. If none of these "negative" criteria are fulfilled, the court then weighs up seven "positive" criteria. Again it asks whether, under the guidelines in section 172, allowing the action to continue would promote the company's success. It also asks whether the claimant is acting in good faith, whether the claimant could start an action in her own name, whether authorisation or ratification has happened or is likely to, and pays particular regard to the views of the independent and disinterested shareholders. This represented a shift from, and a replacement of, the complex pre-2006 position, by giving courts more discretion to allow meritorious claims. Still, the first cases showed the courts remaining conservative. In other respects the law remains the same. According to Wallersteiner v Moir (No 2), minority shareholders will be indemnified for the costs of a derivative claim by the company, even if it ultimately fails.

- Stainer v Lee [2010] EWHC 1539 (Ch); [2011] B.C.C. 134; [2011] 1 B.C.L.C. 537
- Wishart, Petitioner [2009] CSIH 65; [2010] B.C.C. 161
- Kleanthous v Paphitis [2011] EWHC 2287 (Ch)

=== Personal claims and reflective loss ===
While derivative claims mean suing in the company's name, a minority shareholder can sue in her own name in four ways. The first is to claim a "personal right" under the constitution or the general law is breached. If a shareholder brings a personal action to vindicate a personal right (such as the right to not be misled by company circulars) the principle against double recovery dictates that one cannot sue for damages if the loss an individual shareholder suffers is merely the same as will be reflected in the reduction of the share value. For losses reflective of the company's, only a derivative claim may be brought.

== Amending articles ==
A company's articles may be demonstrated to have been amended in an objectively unjustifiably and directly discriminatory fashion. This residual protection for minorities was developed by the Court of Appeal in Allen v Gold Reefs of West Africa Ltd, where Sir Nathaniel Lindley MR held that shareholders may amend a constitution by the required majority so long as it is "bona fide for the benefit of the company as a whole." This constraint is not heavy, as it can mean that a constitutional amendment, while applying in a formally equal way to all shareholders, has a negative and disparate impact on only one shareholder. This was so in Greenhalgh v Arderne Cinemas Ltd, where the articles were changed to remove all shareholders' pre-emption rights, but only one shareholder (the claimant, Mr Greenhalgh, who lost) was interested in preventing share sales to outside parties.

== Just and equitable winding up ==
A drastic right of a shareholder, now under the Insolvency Act 1986 section 122(1)(g), to show it is "just and equitable" for a company to be liquidated. In Ebrahimi v Westbourne Galleries Ltd, Lord Wilberforce held that a court would use its discretion to wind up a company if three criteria were fulfilled: that the company was a small "quasi-partnership" founded on mutual confidence of the corporators, that shareholders participate in the business, and there are restrictions in the constitution on free transfer of shares. Given these features, it may be just and equitable to wind up a company if the court sees an agreement just short of a contract, or some other "equitable consideration", that one party has not fulfilled. So where Mr Ebrahmi, a minority shareholder, had been removed from the board, and the other two directors paid all company profits out as director salaries, rather than dividends to exclude him, the House of Lords regarded it as equitable to liquidate the company and distribute his share of the sale proceeds to Mr Ebrahimi.

== Unfair prejudice ==
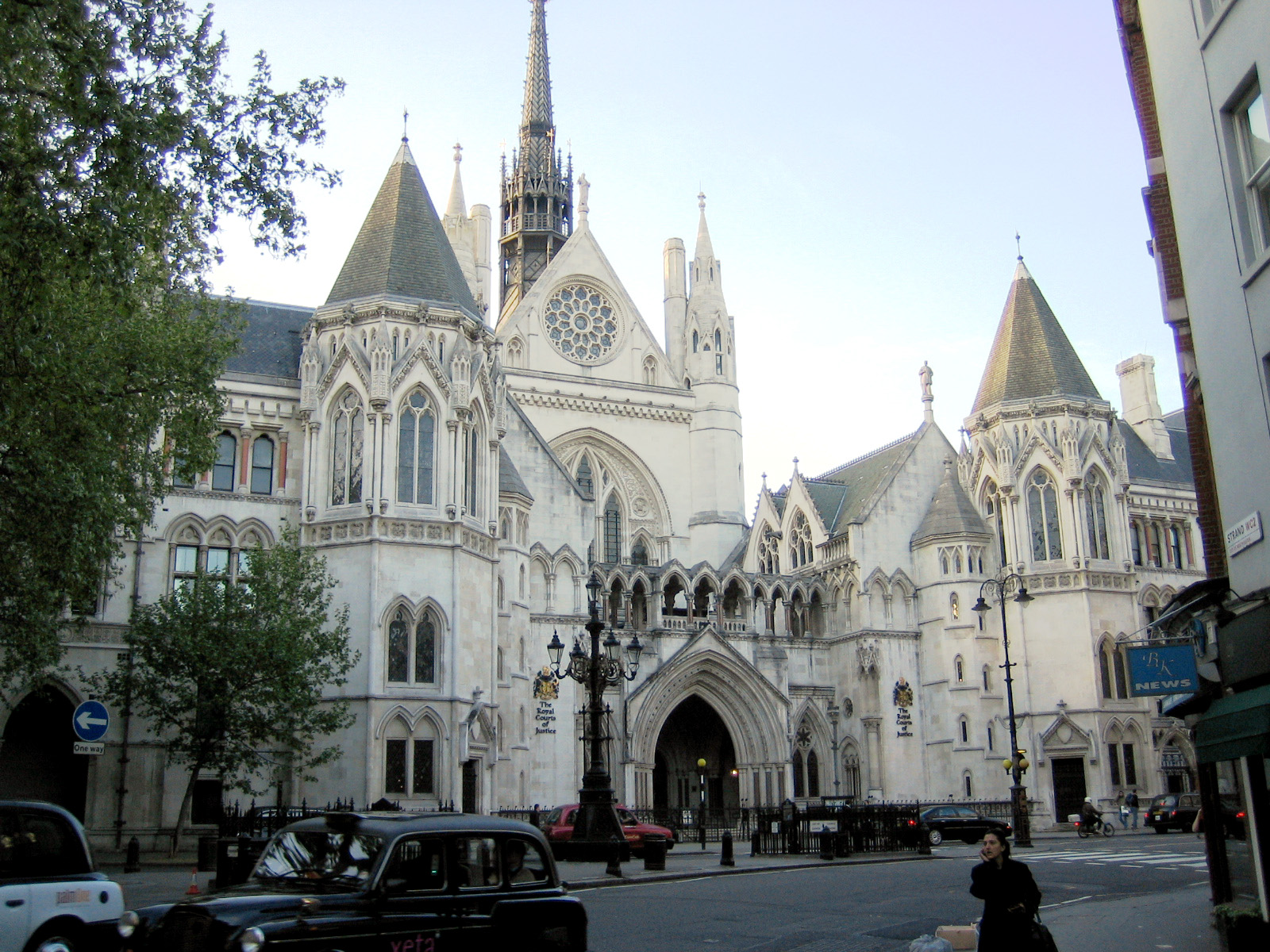
The most numerous type of case in company litigation involves unfair prejudice petitions in closely held businesses.

The drastic remedy of liquidation was mitigated significantly as the unfair prejudice action was introduced by the Companies Act 1985. Now under the Companies Act 2006 section 996, a court can grant any remedy, but will often simply require that a minority shareholder's interest is bought out by the majority at a fair value. The cause of action, stated in section 994, is very broad. A shareholder must simply allege they have been prejudiced (i.e. their interests as a member have been harmed) in a way that is unfair. "Unfairness" is now given a minimum meaning identical to that in Ebrahimi v Westbourne Galleries Ltd. A court must at least have an "equitable consideration" to grant a remedy. Generally this will refer to an agreement between two or more corporators in a small business that is just short of being an enforceable contract, for the lack of legal consideration. A clear assurance, on which a corporator relies, which would be inequitable to go back on, would suffice, unlike the facts of the leading case, O'Neill v Phillips. Here Mr O'Neill had been a prodigy in Mr Phillips' asbestos stripping business, and took on a greater and greater role until economic difficulties struck. Mr O'Neill was then demoted, but claimed that he should be given 50 per cent of the company's shares because negotiations had started for this to happen and Mr Phillips had said one day it might. Lord Hoffmann held that the vague aspiration that it "might" was not enough here: there was no concrete assurance or promise given, and so no unfairness in Mr Phillips' recanting. Unfair prejudice in this sense is an action not well suited to public companies, when the alleged obligations binding the company were potentially undisclosed to public investors in the constitution, since this would undermine the principle of transparency. However it is plain that minority shareholders can also bring claims for more serious breaches of obligation, such as breach of directors' duties. Unfair prejudice petitions remain most prevalent in small companies, and are the most numerous form of dispute to enter company courts.

== International comparisons ==
=== United States ===
- Zapata Corp v Maldonado 430 A 2d 779 (Del Sup 1979)
- Joy v North, 692 F 2d 880 (1982)
- Aronson v Lewis, 473 A 2d 805, 812 (Del 1984)
- Levine v Smith
- In re Oracle Corp Derivative Litigation (2003)
- Meiselman v Meiselman, 309 NC 279, 307 SE 2d 551 (1983)

=== Germany ===
- Atkiengesetz section 147 III

== See also ==
- UK company law
- US corporate law
