= Atlasview Ltd v Brightview Ltd =

- Court: High Court (Chancery)
- Citations: [2004] EWHC 1056 (Ch), [2004] 2 BCLC 191

Keywords
- Unfair prejudice, reflective loss

Atlasview Ltd v Brightview Ltd [2004] EWHC 1056 (Ch) is a UK company law case, which concerns a claim for unfair prejudice (now s 994 Companies Act 2006) and raised the question of barring a claim if attempted to recover for reflective loss (loss to the company, which also prejudices a member). The case is a notable precedent because it makes clear that a nominee shareholder is also a legitimate petitioner for unfair prejudice.

== Facts ==
Brightview Ltd provided internet services. Its shares were in two classes, X and Y shares. Mr Shalson held the majority of X shares through another company called Reedbest Properties Ltd. Atlasview Ltd controlled the majority of Y shares. Brightview's business had faltered after it failed to fulfill an immediate demand to repay a loan of £5.24 million from the X shareholders. An administration order was made. Shortly after, Brightview was sold to another company owned by the X shareholders.

Atlasview complained that it (with Y shareholders) had been unfairly prejudiced under Companies Act 1985, section 459 (now s 994 Companies Act 2006). It argued the loan terms left the company so exposed that the X shareholders were able to strip the company's assets for its own benefit and to the exclusion of Y shareholders. Moreover, Atlasview argued that an "investment agreement" with Mr Shalson was breached when the loan was taken.

Mr Shalson and Reedbest argued that Atlasview could not make a claim because it was merely a nominee shareholder and therefore had no economic interest in Brightview, and therefore could not be "prejudiced". They also argued that Atlasview was attempting to claim losses for the diminution of the Y shares' value, as a result of an alleged breach of director's duty, but they should be barred because this loss was merely reflective of the company's loss. Accordingly, they requested that the claim be struck out as an abuse of process, because Atlasview should have sought redress through opposing the initial administration petition.

== Judgment ==
Deputy Judge Jonathan Crow held there was no good reason for striking out the petition, except that two of the petitioners who were not members of the company, nor had shares transferred to them by operation of law, should be removed from the petition. He also held that the "interests" of a nominee shareholder could certainly include the economic and contractual interests of a beneficial owner, and the court had the discretion under s 461 (now s 996) to make an appropriate award.

On the reflective loss argument, there was no good reason to prevent a claim for breach of directors' duties, even if they are owed to the company, because the wording of s 994 did not preclude it. Nor did the case law support such a change, since one of the reasons for the unfair prejudice petition being introduced was to "outflank" the restrictive procedure for derivative actions.

Lastly there was no clear abuse of process, as it may well have been that the administration petition was done too quickly for Atlasview to respond.

== See also ==
- UK company law
- Bhullar v Bhullar
- O'Donnell v Shanahan

Referred to in judgment

- Attorney General v Blake [2001] 1 AC 268
- Re Cade (J E) & Son Ltd [1991] BCC 360
- Re a Company No 005287 of 1985 (1985) 1 BCC 99,586
- Re a Company No 00477 of 1986 (1986) 2 BCC 99,171
- Re a Company No 003160 of 1986 (1986) 2 BCC 99,276
- Re Elgindata Ltd [1991] BCLC 959
- Giles v Rhind [2003] Ch 618
- Re Harrison (Saul D) & Sons plc [1994] BCC 475
- Johnson v Gore Wood & Co [2002] 2 AC 1
- O'Neill v Phillips [1999] 1 WLR 1092
- Rock (Nominees) Ltd v RCO Holdings plc [2004] BCC 466
- Three Rivers District Council v Governor and Company of the Bank of England (No 3) [2003] 2 AC 1
- Civil Procedure Rules 1998 Part 3, r 3.4(2)(a)
