= Patel v Ali =

1984 legal case

- Court: High Court
- Citation: [1984] Ch 283

Case opinions
- Goulding J

Keywords
- Remedies, specific performance

Patel v Ali [1984] Ch 283 is an English contract law case, concerning the possibility of claiming specific performance of a promise after breach of contract.

== Facts ==
A vendor of a house became disabled after the sale. If she went through with the sale she would have lost the house. The buyer of the house demanded specific performance to convey the property.

== Judgment ==
Goulding J refused to grant specific performance, and granted only damages. As a discretionary, equitable remedy, specific performance was refused on the ground that considerable hardship would be caused.

== See also ==
- English contract law
- Sky Petroleum v VIP Petroleum [1974] 1 WLR 576
- Restatement (Second) of Contracts 1979 §364
