= Irvine Goulding =

English barrister and High Court judge

Sir Ernest Irvine Goulding (1 May 1910 - 13 January 2000) was an English barrister and High Court judge between 1971 and 1985. He was one of the first members of Wilberforce Chambers.

== Biography ==
Goulding was educated at the Merchant Taylors' School and St Catharine's College, Cambridge.

== Cases ==
Important decisions which Goulding J handed down included:

- Patel v Ali [1985] Ch 283 - on specific performance for breach of contract
- Sky Petroleum Ltd v VIP Petroleum Ltd [1974] 1 WLR 576 – also on specific performance
- Mutual Life Insurance Co of New York v Rank Organisation Ltd [1985] BCLC 11 – on unfair prejudice
- Chase Manhattan Bank NA v Israel-British Bank (London) Ltd [1981] Ch 105 – arguable his most famous decision, on tracing through international bank settlement systems – the decision has been subject to "sustained, authoritative criticism."
- Oppenheimer v Cattermole [1976] AC 249 - Goulding J had to decide whether a Nazi-era law expropriating Jewish property should be recognised; his refusal to recognise it was upheld by the House of Lords
- Hodgson v National and Local Government Officers Association [1972] 1 WLR 130 – concerning the governance of trade unions.
- Berry v Warnett (Inspector of Taxes) [1978] 1 WLR 957 - concerning tax avoidance.
- Schemmer v Property Resources Ltd [1975] Ch 273 - on recognition of a foreign receivership order.

== Family ==
He was father to Sir Marrack Goulding, a diplomat.

== Arms ==
Coat of arms of Irvine Goulding

Motto
Inchiostro Non In Chiostro
