= Co-op Insurance Society Ltd v Argyll Stores Holdings Ltd =

1997 English contract law case

Co-operative Insurance Ltd v Argyll Stores Ltd
- Court: House of Lords
- Citations: [1997] UKHL 17, [1998] AC 1

Case opinions
- Lord Hoffmann

Keywords
- Remedies, specific performance

Co-operative Insurance Society Ltd v Argyll Stores (Holdings) Ltd [1997] UKHL 17 is an English contract law case, concerning the possibility of claiming specific performance of a promise after breach of contract.

== Facts ==
The Co-operative Insurance Society Ltd owned the freehold of a shopping centre and they let the anchor unit to Argyll as a supermarket, for 35 years, starting 1979, with a covenant to ‘keep open the demised premises for retail trade’. In 1995, the store was making a loss and Argyll closed, despite The Co-operative Insurance's protests.

The trial judge refused a specific performance order. The Court of Appeal granted an award of specific performance by a majority, because there was considerable difficulty proving a loss suffered and Argyll had acted with ‘unmitigated commercial cynicism’. Argyll appealed.

== Judgment ==
The House of Lords allowed Argyll’s appeal and said the judge’s exercise of discretion was correct so that no specific performance could be awarded. Setting out reasons, (1) it was settled practice that no order would make someone run a business (2) enormous losses would result from being forced to run a trade (3) framing the order would be hard (4) wasteful litigation over compliance could result (5) it was oppressive to have to run a business under threat of contempt of court (6) it was against the public interest to require a business to be run if compensation was a plausible alternative. Lord Hoffmann said the following.

The purpose of the law of contract is not to punish wrongdoing but to satisfy the expectations of the party entitled to performance… The exercise of the discretion as to whether or not to grant specific performance starts from the fact that the covenant has been broken. Both landlord and tenant in this case are large sophisticated commercial organisations and I have no doubt that both were perfectly aware that the remedy for breach of the covenant was likely to be limited to an award of damages. The interests of both were purely financial: there was no element of personal breach of faith… No doubt there was an effect on the businesses of other traders in the Centre, but Argyll had made no promises to them and it is not suggested that CIS warranted to other tenants that Argyll would remain. Their departure, with or without the consent of CIS, was a commercial risk which the tenants were able to deploy in negotiations for the next rent review.

This case could be contrasted with Warner Brothers v. Nelson [Bette Davis] (1936 KB), where the court agreed to enforce a negative personal obligation, an obligation not to work in the film industry but with Warner Bros.

== See also ==
- English contract law
- Sky Petroleum v VIP Petroleum [1974] 1 WLR 576
- Restatement (Second) of Contracts 1979 §364
