= Profinance Trust SA v Gladstone =

- Court: Court of Appeal of England and Wales
- Decided: July 2, 2001
- Citations: [2001] EWCA Civ 1031, [2002] 1 BCLC 141

Court membership
- Judges sitting: Schiemann LJ, Robert Walker LJ, Lloyd J

Case opinions
- Robert Walker LJ

Keywords
- Derivative claim

Profinance Trust SA v Gladstone [2001] EWCA Civ 1031 is a UK company law and UK insolvency law case concerning derivative claims.

== Facts ==
Profinance Trust won an unfair prejudice claim to have its share stake in a company called Americanino Ltd bought out at a fair value by Gladstone, the majority shareholder. Valuations had been agreed for various dates, and the parties wished to know whether the appropriate date for valuation was either (1) when the petition was presented for unfair prejudice or (2) the date of the hearing (which would mean a higher price). Lewison QC at first instance had held that the court could include an element of interest to reflect delays in payment. Profinance argued that the date of the hearing was appropriate.

== Judgment ==
Robert Walker LJ ordered that the time for valuation in this case was the date of the hearing, resulting in £215,000, which meant Mr Gladstone had to purchase Profinance’s stake of 40% at £86,000. On the argument that it could not consider an equivalent of interest he noted that ‘a denial of the court’s power to award the equivalent of interest would come close to straining at a gnat.’ The starting point for share valuation is the date of the order, following Re London School of Electronics. But an earlier valuation will be appropriate where (1) a company is deprived of business (2 )a company is reconstructed so it has a new economic identity (3) a minority has petitioned on the basis that there has been a fall in the market, In re Cumana Ltd (4) but it is not just to be varied to give the claimant the best route out (5) the parties’ conduct matters.

== See also ==
- UK company law
