= Universe Tankships Inc. of Monrovia v International Transport Workers' Federation =

Universe Tankships Inc. of Monrovia v ITWF
- Court: House of Lords
- Full case name: Universe Tankships Inc. of Monrovia v. International Transport Workers' Federation
- Citation: [1982] 2 All ER 67
- Transcript

Court membership
- Judges sitting: Lord Diplock, Lord Cross of Chelsea, Lord Russell of Killowen, Lord Scarman, Lord Brandon of Oakbrook

Case opinions
- Lord Diplock, Lord Scarman

Keywords
- Duress, trade dispute

Universe Tankships Inc. of Monrovia v International Transport Workers' Federation [1982] 2 All ER 67 is an English contract law case relating to duress.

== Facts ==
The International Transport Workers' Federation black listed a Universe Tankships Inc. ship in the context of a trade dispute. To secure the release of the ship, Universe Tankships Inc. paid $6,480 into ITWF's welfare fund. ITWF admitted this was an agreement procured by duress, but it argued its actions were protected by immunity from tort in Trade Union and Labour Relations Act 1974 s 13.

== Judgment ==
Lord Diplock said duress is not about not knowing what you are contracting for, but 'his apparent consent was induced by pressure exercised on him by that other party which the law does not regard as legitimate, with the consequence that the consent is treated in law as revocable unless approbated either expressly or by implication after the illegitimate pressure has ceased to operate on his mind.' It was not appropriate to say the conduct was commercial pressure 'wherever one party to a commercial transaction is in a stronger bargaining position than the other party' should give rise to a right of redress.

Lord Scarman said that duress not only renders a contract voidable but is also a tort if it causes damage or loss (referring to Barton v Armstrong and Pao On v. Lau Yiu Long). It comes from (1) pressure amounting to compulsion of the will of the victim; and (2) the illegitimacy of the pressure exerted. The 'lack of any practicable choice but to submit' should be proved for (1) and here, for (2) the question was whether it was a trade dispute. The majority held the payment was unconnected with terms and conditions of employment and therefore not a trade dispute within s 29(1). Hence the act was duress.

== See also ==
- UK labour law
- English contract law
- Lloyds Bank Ltd. v Bundy [1975] QB 326
- Williams v. Walker-Thomas Furniture Co. 350 F.2d 445 (C.A. D.C. 1965)
- Pao On v Lau Yiu Long [1980] AC 614
- Alec Lobb (Garages) Ltd v Total Oil (Great Britain) Ltd [1984]
