= Re Blue Arrow plc =

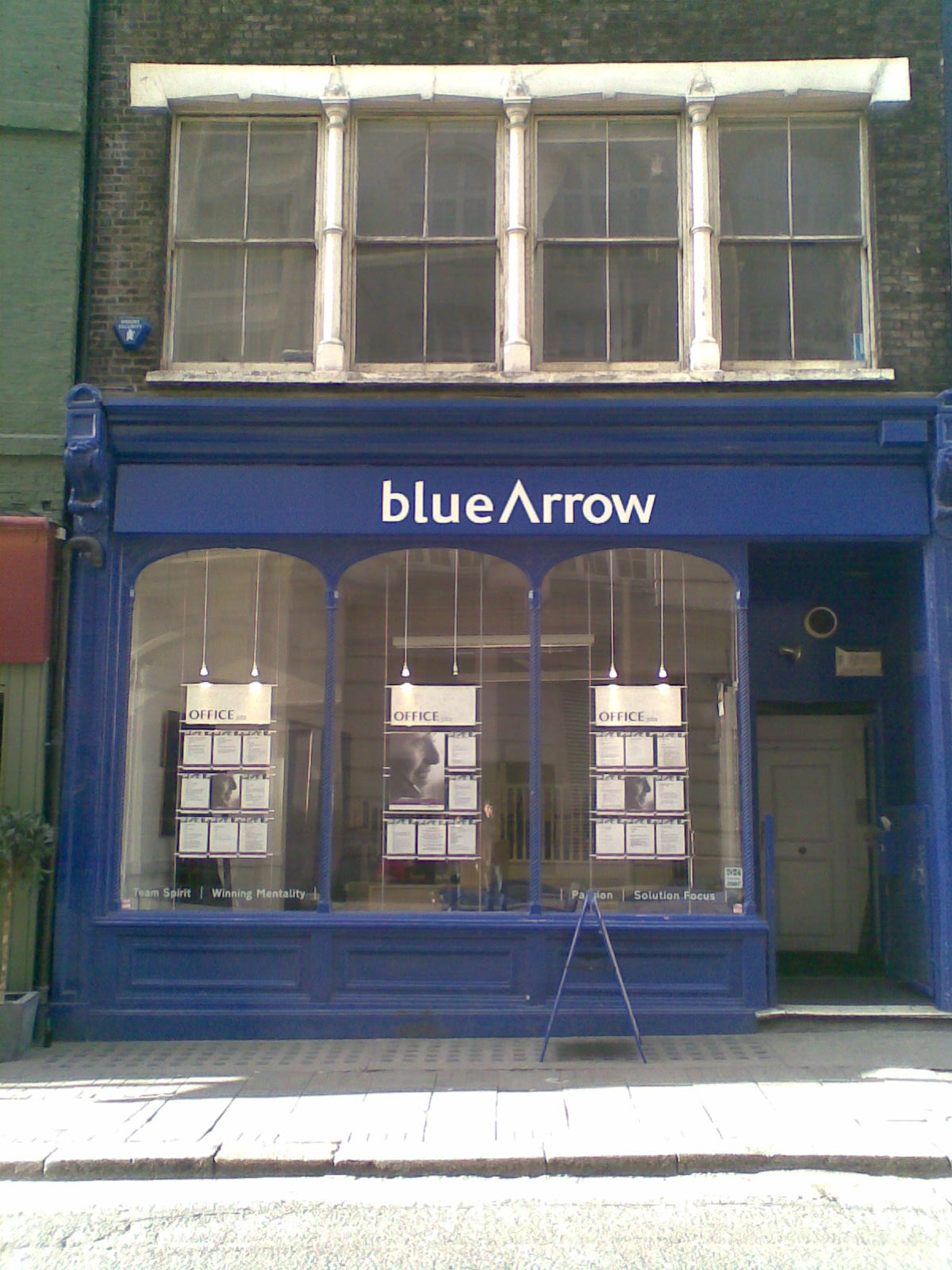
- Sheila Birch failed to regain the control of Blue Arrow.
- Court: High Court
- Citation: [1987] BCLC 585

Case opinions
- Vinelott J

Re Blue Arrow plc [1987] BCLC 585 is a United Kingdom company law case dealing with unfair prejudice under s 459 Companies Act 1985 (now s 994 Companies Act 2006).

== Facts ==
Mrs Watson-Challis was in the recruitment agency business. Between 1956 and 1982, she had built up a variety of businesses. In business she went by the pseudonym of "Sheila Birch". During this time period, she was connected with Mr Berry. They were impressed by each other's business talents and decided to set up a new company. She transferred her business and shareholdings to the new firm, Blue Arrow, in which she took a 45% stake. Mr Berry took a 55% stake. Blue Arrow had a variety of subsidiaries. Mrs Watson-Challis was the executive director of the subsidiaries and the "president" of the parent, while Mr Berry was the chairman. By 1984, Mrs Watson-Challis was travelling overseas, and no longer taking an active part of the company's affairs. The company was floated, it went public. Over time, with many others buying up new share offerings, her percentage of the shareholding went down to 2.1%. She resigned her directorships, but her position as "president" remained written into the company's constitution, the articles of association. Then she decided she wanted to come back. The management resisted, and they resolved to alter the company's articles so that she could be removed from her position as president. She petitioned the court that such action was "unfairly prejudicial" because she had a legitimate expectation to participate in the company's affairs.

== Judgment ==
Vinelott J refused to grant relief to the petitioner. An alleged agreement that she should remain as the chairman was not looked on favourably in this public company, because it contradicts the principle that in public companies information material to good governance should be disclosed to shareholders. Investors are entitled to assume that the whole of the company's constitution is written in the constitution (not some existential "legitimate expectation"). Particularly, the right to be the company president was a personal right (not a class right) and it could be altered by special resolution. Vinelott J stated,

"As was pointed out by Hoffmann J in Re A Company No 00477 of 1986 [1986] BCLC 376, the interests of a member are not limited to his strict legal rights under the constitution of the company. There are wider equitable considerations which the court must bear in mind in considering whether a case falls within s 459 in particular in deciding what are the legitimate expectations of a member. If I may say so, I respectfully accept that approach, but it is to my mind impossible, on the face of the allegations in the petition, to apply it here. Of course, the petitioner had a legitimate expectation that the affairs of the company would be properly conducted within the framework of its constitution. I wholly fail to understand how it can be said that the petitioner had a legitimate expectation that the articles would not be altered by special resolution in a way which enabled her office to be terminated by some different machinery. No doubt there are cases where a legitimate expectation may be inferred from arrangements outside the ambit of the formal constitution of the company, but it must be borne in mind that this is a public company, a listed company, and a large one, and that the constitution was adopted at the time when the company was first floated on the Unlisted Securities Market. Outside investors were entitled to assume that the whole of the constitution was contained in the articles, read, of course, together with the Companies Acts. There is in these circumstances no room for any legitimate expectation founded on some agreement or arrangement made between the directors and kept up their sleeves and not disclosed to those placing the shares with the public through the Unlisted Securities Market... I think that the petition, on its face, is so hopeless that the only right course is to strike it out."

== See also ==
- United Kingdom company law
