= Re Bird Precision Bellows Ltd =

- Court: Court of Appeal
- Citation: [1984] Ch 658

Case opinions
- Oliver LJ

Keywords
- Unfair prejudice

Re Bird Precision Bellows Ltd [1984] Ch 658 is a UK company law and UK insolvency law case concerning unfair prejudice.

== Facts ==
The majority was ordered to buy the 26% minority in a quasi-partnership under the old Companies Act 1980 section 75, now Companies Act 2006 section 996. There was then a dispute as to the basis on which the court should fix the price, and in particular whether there should be any discount to reflect the fact that the petitioners only had a minority holding.

Nourse J held that the price should be determined on a pro rata basis, without any discount.

== Judgment ==
The Court of Appeal upheld Nourse J and although this was on the basis that this was a proper exercise of the judge’s discretion, Oliver LJ (at p. 674B–C; 99,475) made it clear that he would not himself have come to any other conclusion. Generally there is no discount for the fact that one is a minority shareholder. But the exception is where shareholders acquired their shares as an investment (so they probably would have paid less for a minority stake anyway).

It seems to me that the whole framework of the section… is to confer on the court a very wide discretion to do what is considered fair and equitable in all the circumstances of the case…

== See also ==
- UK company law
