= Unfair prejudice =

Unfair prejudice is a legal term that may describe:

- Unfair prejudice (United Kingdom), relating to company law
- Unfair prejudice (United States), relating to evidence law
