= Mutual Life Insurance Co of New York v Rank Organisation Ltd =

UK company law case

Mutual Life Insurance Co. of New York v The Rank Organisation Ltd. [1985] BCLC 11 is a UK company law case dealing with "oppression" (or unfair prejudice) under section 20 Companies Act 1948 (now s.994 Companies Act 2006). Goulding J delivered the first instance judgment.

== Facts ==
United States and Canadian securities law requires registration of companies for share issues. In 1975 Rank Organisation Ltd, an entertainment company, decided to offer 20 million ordinary shares to the public, with a preference to existing Rank shareholders. This preference offer did not however extend to shareholders based in the United States and Canada (including Mutual Life), because it was thought not to be in the company's interest to have to register there. Rank's articles of association stated that directors could allot, deal with or dispose of company shares "on such terms as they think proper". But the American and Canadian shareholders (they owned shares "beneficially" through nominee companies, who were defendants alongside Rank in the case) were still unhappy. They said they had been discriminated against, and that was a "breach of contract" because s.20 of the Companies Act 1948 implied shareholders deserved equal treatment (this is the "oppression" provision; see now, s 994 unfair prejudice).

== Judgment ==
Goulding J dismissed the shareholders' complaint. He held that section 20 did not create a term of the corporate contract that shareholders were to be treated equally in respect of a board resolution (or for that matter a resolution of shareholders in general meeting). The duties of the directors were to exercise their powers to issue shares in good faith, bona fide in the interests of the company and exercise them fairly between shareholders (not necessarily treat shareholders identically).

That is what the directors had done. The treatment of the American and Canadian shareholders was not unfair, because their shareholdings and rights had not been affected. Rank shareholders had no right to expect their share interest remain in constant proportion to the others' in the company forever. The counsel for the petitioners had suggested that a "discriminatory" allotment should only be decided on where no other option were available, but this was clearly going too far to constrain business decisions. Goulding J review all the authorities and summarised.

"I turn to the remaining test which I have proposed, namely, that of fairness between different shareholders. It must be borne in mind that in my view the equality of individual shareholders in point of right, does not always require an identity of treatment. Compare the first of the passages that I cited from Lord Macnaghten's speech in the British and American Trustee case. After reflection on all that counsel for the plaintiffs (Mr Curry QC) said in argument I remain of opinion that the North American shareholders were fairly treated on the occasion of the offer for sale, notwithstanding their exclusion from participation along with their compatriots who were not already shareholders. Such exclusion did not in any way affect the existence of a shareholder's shares nor the rights attached to them. I do not know whether the transaction had any effect upon their market price. None has been alleged by the plaintiffs, and counsel for the plaintiffs (Mr Curry QC) disclaimed any suggestion that the terms of the offer for sale were improvident, heavily oversubscribed though it was. In any case, no shareholder in Rank, while its articles of association retain their present form, has any right to expect that his fractional interest in the company will remain forever constant. Moreover, the reason why North American shareholders were excluded was because of a difficulty resulting only from their own personal situation. It was not the fault of Rank that they were nationals or residents of countries whose laws impose onerous obligations. Finally, it is not in my judgment unfair to the North American shareholders that Rank should raise capital in the way which it was advised, and its directors believed, was most advantageous for the purposes of maintaining its investment programme, since the successful fulfillment of the programme would give a prospect of continuing benefit to all members whatever their personal situation. The plaintiffs' main attack, in my opinion, therefore, fails."
