= Neylon v Dickens =

- Court: Judicial Committee of the Privy Council
- Full case name: Keith James Neylon and Jean Agnes Neylon v Donn Alexander Dickens and Muriel May Dickens
- Decided: 5 October 1979
- Citation: [1979] UKPC 25
- Transcript: Court of Appeal judgment Privy Council judgment

Court membership
- Judges sitting: Lord Wilberforce, Lord Hailsham of Saint Marylebone, Lord Edmund-Davies, Lord Scarman, Lord Fraser of Tullybelton

Keywords
- variation, waiver

Neylon v Dickens [1977] 2 NZLR 35 is an often cited case regarding whether a change to a contract is a waiver or variation.

== Background ==
The Neylons purchased the Dickens farm, with the sale agreement requiring both parties to get the consent of the High Court within 30 days. Just before the expiry of the 30 days, Neylon's solicitor realized that as his client lived in far away Haast, they would be unable to get the consent in time. Dicken's solicitor agreed to file his clients consent on the basis that the purchasers consent would arrive later, which it did, but after the expiry date.

The vendors claimed that as the expiry date was not met, the sale agreement came to an end. However, the purchasers later obtained an order from the Court of Appeal for specific performance. The Dickens appealed.

== Held ==
The court held that the vendor's solicitor's agreement to file for the consent without first receiving the purchasers consent, was a valid waiver, and so the sale agreement was still a valid agreement.
