= Re London School of Electronics Ltd =

UK company law case

- Court: High Court
- Citation: [1986] Ch 211, [1985] 3 WLR 474, (1985) 1 BCC 99394

Court membership
- Judge sitting: Nourse J

Keywords
- Derivative claim

Re London School of Electronics Ltd [1986] Ch 211 is a UK company law case concerning unfair prejudice.

== Facts ==
Mr Charles Lytton, a teacher, director and 25 per cent shareholder in the London School of Electronics Ltd which taught electronics courses, alleged that two other directors had acted in an oppressive manner under the Companies Act 1980 section 75 (now the unfair prejudice remedy in Companies Act 2006 section 994). Mr Lytton had been dismissed as a director. He then found out that the other directors had agreed with an American university to recognise a BSc course to the other 75 per cent shareholder, a company called CTC Ltd, without any benefit to the company. Mr Lytton told his students that he would be setting up a new college. He was dismissed as a teacher. He managed to get 12 students to follow him.

== Judgment ==
Nourse J held that although CA 1980 section 75 did not say anything about clean hands, and there was no requirement that it be just and equitable to grant relief, it could be considered in the extent of the award made. Here, the breakdown was due to CTC's decision to take the American contract for itself and deprive Lytton of 25 per cent of the benefit, and even though he subsequently took 12 students, this did not make CTC's actions no longer unfair. His shares should be purchased at a fair value, the date of which should be the date of the petition as if the students removed by Lytton had remained with the company.

== See also ==
- UK company law
