= Geoffrey Cross, Baron Cross of Chelsea =

British judge (1904–1989)

The Right Honourable The Lord Cross of Chelsea PC

Lord of Appeal in Ordinary
- In office 1971–1975

Lord Justice of Appeal
- In office 1969–1971

Justice of the High Court
- In office 1960–1969

Personal details
- Born: Arthur Geoffrey Neale Cross London
- Children: 2
- Education: Trinity College, Cambridge

Arthur Geoffrey Neale Cross, Baron Cross of Chelsea, PC (1 December 1904 – 4 August 1989) was a British barrister and judge who served as a Lord of Appeal in Ordinary between 1971 and 1975.

== Early life and career ==
Geoffrey Cross was born in London, the elder child of Arthur George Cross, a quantity surveyor, and of Mary Elizabeth Cross, née Dalton. His younger brother, Rupert Cross, later became a prominent academic lawyer. Cross was educated at Westminster School, where he was a scholar, and Trinity College, Cambridge, where he took Firsts in both parts of the Classics tripos, as well as winning the Craven Scholarship in 1925. He was a fellow of Trinity College from 1927 to 1931, where he authored a notable work on Epirus.

Though "he might have aspired to be a successor to Richard Porson or Sir Richard Jebb", Cross switched to law "for no discernible reason". He was called to the bar by the Middle Temple in 1930 and practised at the Chancery bar. He developed a large junior practice, especially in the field of estate duty. He took silk in 1949. He appeared as leading counsel for the Bank of England before the bank rate leak inquiry in 1956, and for many years acted for Calouste Gulbenkian and his family. He was Chancellor of Durham between 1959 and 1960.

== Judicial career ==
In 1960, after nine years without new appointments to the Chancery Division, Cross was appointed a Justice of the High Court, assigned to the Chancery Division, and received the customary knighthood. He was appointed a Lord Justice of Appeal in 1969, and was sworn of the Privy Council. Two years later, on 12 March 1971, he was appointed a Lord of Appeal in Ordinary and was created a life peer with the title Baron Cross of Chelsea, of the Royal Borough of Kensington and Chelsea. He retired from the House of Lords in 1975, upon reaching fifteen years of judicial service.

After his retirement, Cross served as the Chairman of the Appeal Committee of the Panel on Takeovers and Mergers between 1976 and 1981. From 1976 to 1977 he chaired a commission on the organisation of the accountancy profession.

Cross was elected a bencher of the Middle Temple in 1958 and an honorary fellow of Trinity College, Cambridge in 1972.

== Family ==
In 1952 Cross married Joan Davies, née Wilmot, daughter of Lieutenant-Colonel Theodore Eardley Wilmot, DSO, and widow of Thomas Walton Davies; they had one daughter. Lady Cross of Chelsea died in 2011.

== Selected judgments ==
=== Court of Appeal ===
- Harbutt's "Plasticine" Ltd v Wayne Tank and Pump Co Ltd [1970] 1 QB 447
- Cuckmere Brick Co Ltd v Mutual Finance Ltd [1971] Ch 949

=== House of Lords and Privy Council ===
- National Westminster Bank Ltd v Halesowen Presswork & Assemblies Ltd [1972] AC 785
- Norwich Pharmacal Co v Customs and Excise Comrs [1974] AC 133
- British Eagle International Air Lines Ltd v Cie Nationale Air France [1975] 1 WLR 758
- Barton v Armstrong [1976] AC 104
- DPP v Morgan [1976] AC 182
- Oppenheimer v Cattermole [1976] AC 249
- Universe Tankships Inc of Monrovia v International Transport Workers' Federation [1983] 1 AC 366
