= Oppenheimer v Cattermole =

1976 English judicial decision

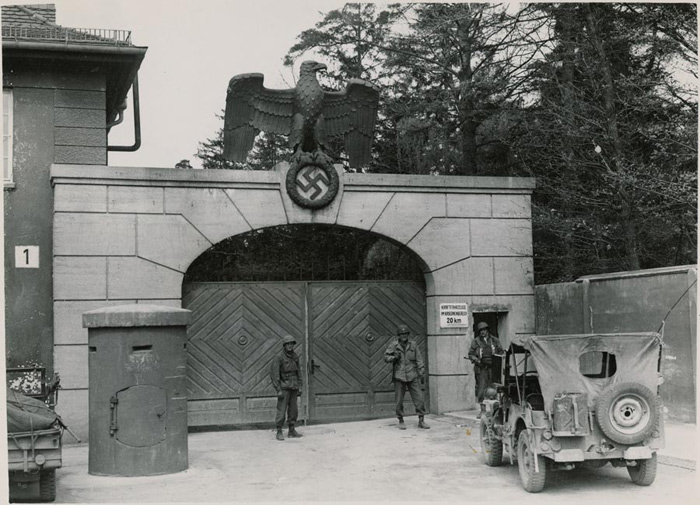
- Dachau concentration camp.
- Court: House of Lords
- Full case name: Oppenheimer v Cattermole (HM Inspector of Taxes), Nothman v Cooper (HM Inspector of Taxes)
- Decided: 5 February 1975
- Citation: [1976] AC 249, [1975] 2 WLR 347, [1975] 1 All ER 538, [1975] STC 91, [1975] TR 13
- Transcript: BAILII

Case history
- Prior actions: [1972] Ch 585 (Oppenheimer v Cattermole) [1975] 2 WLR 347 (Nothman v Cooper)

Court membership
- Judges sitting: Lord Hailsham of St Marylebone; Lord Hodson; Lord Pearson; Lord Cross of Chelsea; Lord Salmon

Keywords
- Public policy, conflict of laws

Oppenheimer v Cattermole [1976] AC 249 is a judicial decision of the English courts relating to whether English law should refuse to recognise Nazi era laws relating to the appropriation of Jewish property. The courts considered the question whether the Nazi law was so iniquitous that it should refuse to recognise it as law, thus raising the "connection between the concepts of law and morality".

The respondent, Frederick Cattermole, was HM Inspector of Taxes.

In the House of Lords, Lord Cross of Chelsea famously held:

a law of this sort constitutes so grave an infringement of human rights that the courts of this country ought to refuse to recognise it as a law at all.

== Background ==
Mr Meier Oppenheimer "was born in Germany in 1896. He qualified there as a teacher and for some 20 years from 1919 to 1939 he taught at a Jewish orphanage in Bavaria. He was detained for a short time at the concentration camp at Dachau, but soon after his release he left Germany in 1939 for England and has resided here ever since. In 1948 he applied for naturalisation and became a naturalised British subject. In 1953 the German authorities determined to make compensation to the employees of Jewish religious communities. They awarded the taxpayer a pension from 1 October 1952. In 1961 he became 65 and they awarded him a second pension. Both pensions were payable out of the public funds of Germany." The pensions were as compensation for the injustice which had been done to him.

The question for the courts was whether Oppenheimer was liable to pay English income tax on his two pensions. This depended on his nationality. If he was a national of the United Kingdom only, the tax was payable. If, on the other hand he had dual nationality of both the UK and Germany, then he was exempt of English income tax. This stemmed from the double taxation conventions concluded between the UK and Germany, later incorporated into English law.

In 1968, the German Federal Constitutional Court decided that the 1941 decree was void ab initio, but that decision had no retrospective effect. Mr Oppenheimer became entitled to apply for reinstatement as a German national and did so, with the status being granted automatically. He subsequently benefited from the dual nationality provision in the double taxation agreement, so the case only covered his status and pension from 1953–54 to 1967–68.

== The decision at first instance ==
The case was first determined by the UK Special Commissioners for income tax, (Note: "Commissioners for the special purposes of the Income Tax Acts", appointed under Section 4 of the Taxes Management Act 1970) who decided that Oppenheimer was only British, and not also German, and therefore had to pay tax on his pensions. Their decision was based on a 1913 German law, when there were no complications of the countries being at war, which stated that a German lost their German nationality if they acquired a foreign nationality without permission.

The commissioners found it unnecessary to decide the case on another German law of 1941, which decreed that a Jew in Germany lost his German nationality as soon as he left Germany. Under Art. 116 (2) of the post-war German Constitution, any victim of the 1941 decree was entitled to resume his German citizenship by applying to the German authorities. This he had not done.

Oppenheimer submitted on his UK nationality form that he was German at the time of being naturalised in 1948.

At a meeting of the Commissioners for the Special Purposes of the Income Tax Acts held on 19th January 1970 Meier Oppenheimer (hereinafter called "the Appellant") appealed against assessments to income tax in the sum of £800 for each of the years 1953-54 to 1967-68 inclusive.

— Oppenheimer v Cattermole (H.M. Inspector of Taxes) (1971-1977) 50 TC 159

== Judgment by Goulding J ==
The administrative decision by the Special Commissioners for income tax was then decided by Goulding J, who determined in Oppenheimer's favour; he was declared to have both nationalities, and did not need to pay tax on his pensions.

Goulding agreed with the argument of counsel for Oppenheimer that the 1913 German Act had no effect as he had already lost his nationality with the 1941 Act which was effective only on Jews. This then created the option by English law that he was also German, a legal fiction. The logic behind this is the subject of an article written by the legal commentator J. G. Merrills, the Edward Bramley Professor of Law at Sheffield University.

== Judgment in the Court of Appeal ==
The decision by Goulding J was appealed by the Special Commissioners for income tax, and was heard in the Court of Appeal, by Lord Denning M.R (Master of the Rolls)., Buckley and Orr L.JJ. They decided in favour of the Special Commissioners, and so Oppenheimer now had orders to pay tax on his pensions.

In Lord Denning's view when Oppenheimer assumed his United Kingdom nationality in 1948 it was impossible for him to retain his German nationality because nationality and allegiance go hand in hand and a person cannot owe allegiance to two countries which are at war with each other.

Lord Denning stated that it was for English law to determine the nationality in this case. He also made reference to Russell J. in Stoeck v. Public Trustee [1921] 2 Ch. 67, 82:"Whether a person is a national of a country must be determined by the municipal law of that country. Upon this I think all text writers are agreed." Lord Cross of Chelsea, see below, did not agree with this assessment.

== Judgment in the House of Lords ==
The court of final appeal in 1976 was the House of Lords, and the case was heard by Lord Hailsham of St. Marylebone, Lord Hodson, Lord Pearson, Lord Cross of Chelsea and Lord Salmon. The appeal to the House of Lords was dismissed.

All Lords agreed with Lord Cross of Chelsea who ordered in the following terms:

"That this case be and the same is hereby remitted back to the Commissioners for the Special Purposes of the Income Tax Acts for further consideration, and with a direction that they amend the case stated by finding on further consideration of the evidence already adduced and on consideration of any further evidence the parties may adduce and taking into account any relevant decisions of the German courts and their necessary implications and any other provision of German law (a) whether for the purposes of German municipal law the appellant was deprived of his German citizenship by the decree of November 25, 1941; (b) if the appellant was not deprived of his German citizenship by the said decree whether for the purposes aforesaid he was deprived of German citizenship by the German Nationality Law of July 22, 1913, on being naturalised a British subject on May 24, 1948, and taking into account his oath of allegiance on June 4, 1948; (c) if the appellant was deprived of German citizenship by the said decree or by the said German nationality law at any time prior to the assessment years whether (i) his German citizenship was reinstated or deemed to be reinstated by the constitution of the Federal Republic or by any legislation or judicial decision or under any other provision of German law, or (ii) his German citizenship would have been reinstated at any time before or during the relevant years of assessment if he had applied for German citizenship under article 116 of the Grundgesetz ['Basic Law'] 1949. And it is further ordered, that the said commissioners do report the amended case to this House."

== Precedents applied ==
In all hearings it was contended on behalf of Oppenheimer that on the authority of Rex v Home Secretary, ex parte L. [1945] 1 K.B. 7, and Lowenthal v Attorney General [1948] 1 All E.R. 295, Oppenheimer's purported loss of German citizenship under the decree of 1941 could not be recognised by English courts and that irrespective of German law, under English law he remained a German national after 25 November 1941 on the grounds that English law did not recognise a change of nationality by a decree of a foreign enemy state in wartime, and English law would not give effect, as far as it related to matters in England, to a penal and confiscatory decree of a foreign country. It was thus a decision based on a mixture of public policy and morality.

== Outcome ==
"... the decision turned ultimately upon an issue which the English courts treat as a question of fact, namely the appellant's nationality in German law."

"... the House (of Lords) took the unusual step of remitting the case to the special commissioners for further consideration".

After the special commissioners heard evidence from Dr Cohn and Dr Jacques (with special experience in German law), "The House of Lords final decision was that on the new evidence in relation to German law, and in particular the provisions of Article 116 (2) of the Basic German Law of 1949, as subsequently interpreted by the German courts, Mr. Oppenheimer must be taken to have lost his German nationality in 1949, and since he had not taken the steps open to him under that article to resume his German nationality, he was a British but not a German national during the relevant period, and as such was subject to United Kingdom tax."

Oppenheimer confirms the English courts' tendency to take their international law from textbooks instead of from the primary sources. Yet there is no shortage of material from which principles of customary international law relating to non-discrimination and deprivation of nationality might be derived. A review by the House of Lords of some of this material would have been welcome, as both a clear demonstration of the grounding of the decision in contemporary ideals and as a contribution to the development of customary international law… The work relied on in Oppenheimer was the second edition of Wolff's Private International Law, published in 1950.

— International and Comparative Law Quarterly, Vol 4, No 24, Oct 1975, page 617. Oppenheimer v. Cattermole - The Curtain Falls; Merrills, J. G. Senior Lecturer in Law, Sheffield University

== Some of the key issues ==
- When to use English law when it is also necessary to consider foreign municipal law.
- Considering nationality in a time of war (security and the enemy aliens rule).
- Assessing the legitimacy of laws that do not meet peremptory norms of international law.
- Whether it is public policy (from English perspective) to not accept German law, or that the German law of 1941 was "penal and confiscatory". The public policy being that of wisdom to allow potential enemy aliens to adopt new nationalities in time of war, as they may then be well placed to engage in war in the heart of English territory.,
- Making judicial determinations when there is little in precedent as guidance, and when that which is present is contradictory. Goulding J wrote, "Here I am once more walking in unlighted ways, and have to do the best I can without authoritative guidance."
- The analogy of nationality to property.

The case is often cited for the quote of Lord Cross in relation to the repugnance of the English courts for Nazi era confiscation laws. However, there are other English decisions where similar laws have been broadly recognised as effective to a certain degree (Frankfurther v W L Exner Ltd [1947] Ch 629 and Bohm v Czerny (1940) 190 LT Jo 54).
