= William Sindall plc v Cambridgeshire CC =

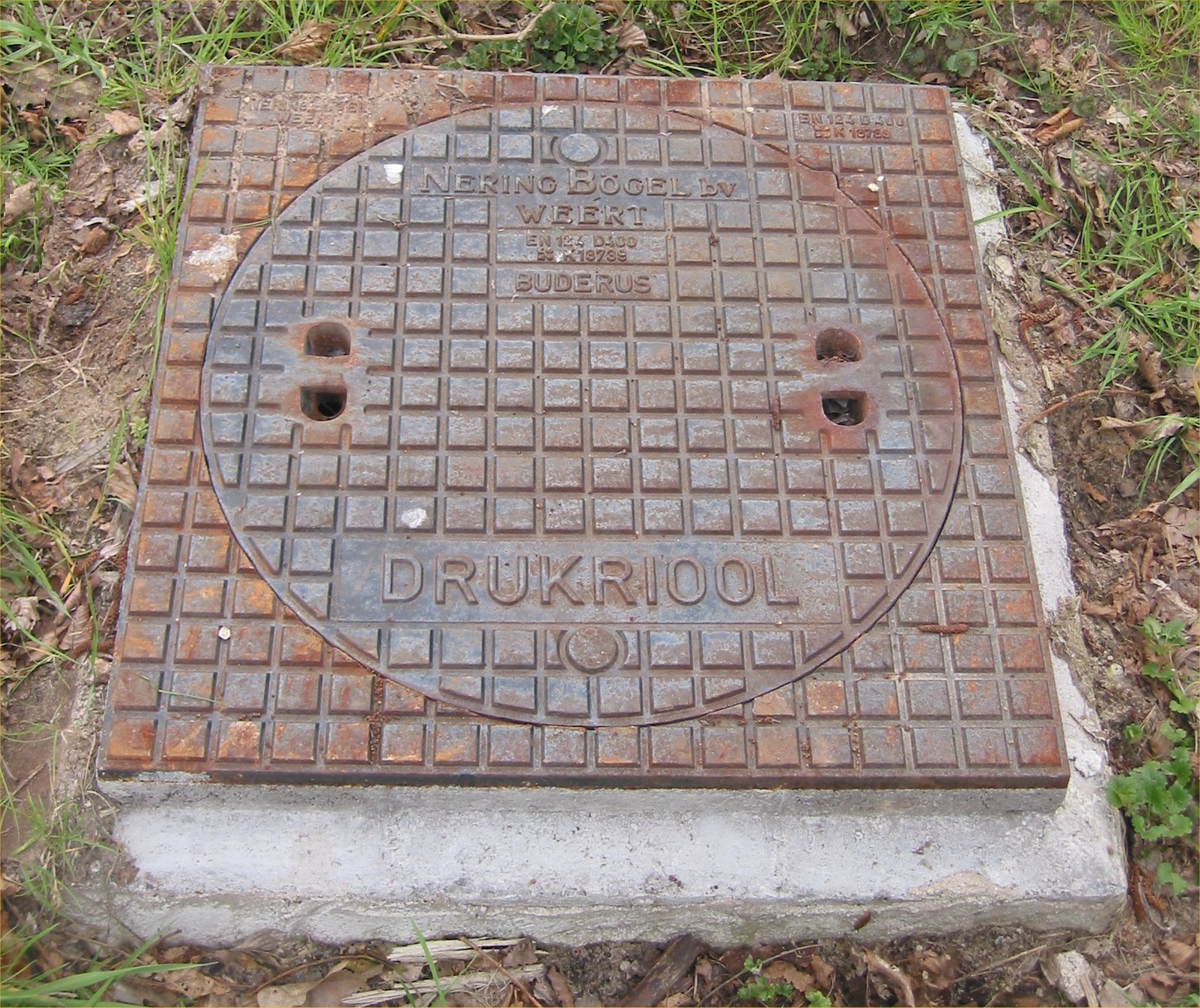
- Court: Court of Appeal
- Citations: [1993] EWCA Civ 14, [1994] 1 WLR 1016

Case opinions
- Hoffmann LJ, Evans LJ

Keywords
- Innocent misrepresentation,

William Sindall plc v Cambridgeshire County Council [1993] EWCA Civ 14 is an English contract law case concerned with misrepresentation. It concerns the exercise of discretion under s 2(2) of the Misrepresentation Act 1967.

== Facts ==
Construction firm William Sindall plc agreed to buy land from Cambridgeshire County Council after they were told that the council was aware of no easements. But a private sewer from 20 years before was found after completion. The important point was, however, that after William Sindall plc made the purchase the property market crashed and the value of the land plummeted. William Sindall plc sued for rescission for misrepresentation and common mistake.

For mistake, it was held that the contract allocated risk of unknown sewers to the buyer (now rescission for common mistake on the grounds of equity is impossible unless the mistake is fundamental because of The Great Peace).

== Judgment ==
At first instance, Cooke J, sitting in the Mayor's and City of London Court, held that Sindall was entitled to rescind the sale.

On appeal, Hoffmann LJ held there was no misrepresentation and no operative mistake. However, had it been necessary for the exercise of discretion under s 2(2) he said that the three factors for deciding what is "equitable" are

- the nature of the misrepresentation; here it was a £5m land sale, but the misrepresentation would only cost £18k to put right
- loss caused were the contract upheld; this is a power to award damages where none were previously recoverable. Because of s 2(3) this is not compensation for the loss, but damages for the misrepresentation as such.
- taking into account that the loss of a bargain was £8m for the council and the ‘gross disparity’ to the loss to Sindall plc he would have exercised his discretion and awarded damages.

Hoffmann LJ said that section 2(1) is concerned with the "damage flowing from having entered into the contract, while section 2(2) is concerned with damage caused by the property not being what it was represented to be". The point of s 2(2) is to have a different effect to s 2(1), so that representors are not unfairly oppressed when someone gets out of a bargain after a little misrepresentation. In this case he would have exercised discretion under s 2(2) so as to prevent William Sindall plc escaping from a bad bargain.

Evans LJ noted that the loss would be very great to the Council because the land was now worth only a fraction of the purchase price plus interest, as well as it having to repeat the tendering process.

== See also ==
- English contract law
- Misrepresentation in English law
