= Co-op Insurance =

Insurance company in the UK

Co-op Insurance Services Limited
- Company type: Subsidiary
- Industry: Insurance services
- Founded: 29 August 1867; 158 years ago
- Headquarters: CIS Tower, Manchester, United Kingdom
- Key people: Charles Offord (Managing Director)
- Products: General insurance
- Revenue: £4.4 billion
- Parent: The Co-operative Group
- Website: www.coop.co.uk/insurance

Co-op Insurance Services Limited, trading as Co-op Insurance, is a general insurance company which is part of the Co-operative Group, based in Manchester, United Kingdom.

For most of its history, Co-op Insurance was also a life insurer and fund manager, sharing surpluses with holders of its 'with-profits' life policies, as well as with individual members of The Co-operative Group in proportion to their general insurance patronage. In 2013, Royal London Group agreed to buy the life insurance business unit for an estimated £219 million. In 2020, Co-op sold its underwriting business. Since then, Co-op Insurance has become a brand that focuses on marketing and selling insurance. It now offers home, car, travel, pet, life, and over-50s life insurance. It also offers loans.

== History ==
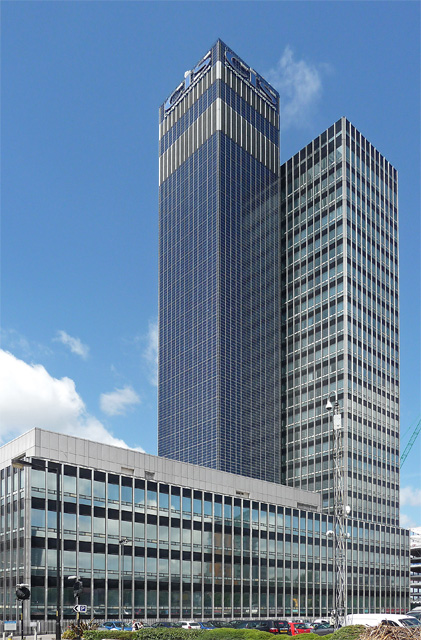
The Grade II listed CIS Tower, designed by G.S. Hay and Gordon Tait.

The Co-operative Insurance Company Limited was formed in 1867 to provide fire and fidelity guarantee insurance to co-operative societies. In 1886, at an Annual General Meeting it was resolved "...that Life Assurance be undertaken by the Company, and that the shareholders forfeit any rights they may have to the profits of the Life Department and agree that they shall belong exclusively to the Policyholders." In 1899, industrial life business was also introduced and the company was converted into an industrial and provident society, changing its name to Co-operative Insurance Society Limited (CIS). Other classes of business were provided for the general public and not just for co-operative societies and their members.

The shares of the Society were taken over by the Co-operative Wholesale Society and the Scottish Co-operative Wholesale Society in 1913. In 1973, the Scottish Co-operative Wholesale Society merged with CWS. CWS became The Co-operative Group on merger with Co-operative Retail Services in 2000.

In 2002, due to the poor performance of CIS, Co-operative Financial Services was created as a holding company for both CIS and The Co-operative Bank including Smile, the first full internet bank and, in 2008, The Co-operative Insurance and The Co-operative Investments trading names were introduced. In 2011, Co-operative Financial Services became the Co-operative Banking Group.

In 2006, CIS split its life and general insurance businesses into two separate entities, establishing CIS General Insurance Limited within which all new and renewing insurance business was written. All existing CIS general insurance business was reinsured with CISGIL and CIS continued to write long-term savings and insurance business only. CFS Management Services Limited was created at the same time to provide common support services to both CIS and CISGIL. In 2011, after 125 years, The Co-operative Insurance announced that it would cease providing life assurance products.

=== Divestment ===
In March 2013, the Co-operative Banking Group agreed to sell the life insurance, investment and pension businesses to the Royal London Mutual Insurance Society, due to ongoing issues with internal management capability. The intention to sell the general insurance aspect was also announced, although in the event of a sale, it stated it would continue to sell re-badged products under The Co-operative Insurance name. The administration of the life portfolio had been managed by Capita Group since 2007 in an attempt to reduce operating costs. In May 2013, the Co-operative Banking Group withdrew from the agreed purchase of the TSB business after regulators uncovered the extent of issues within the company. In June, the Group revealed a shortfall in its accounts of up to £1.8 billion, related to bad debts on commercial real estate, belated costs following the 2009 purchase of Britannia Building Society, and a failed overhaul of key IT systems.

In July 2013, Co-operative Insurance Society became a private company limited by shares under the Companies Act, changing its name to Royal London (CIS) Limited. Subsidiary undertakings, CIS Unit Managers Limited (trading as The Co-operative Investments) and CIS Policyholder Services Limited became RLUM (CIS) Limited and RL Marketing (CIS) Limited respectively. The Co-operative Asset Management Limited also transferred, becoming Royal London Asset Management (CIS) Limited. Excluded from the sale, CIS General Insurance remained with the Co-operative Banking Group.

In January 2014, The Co-operative Group announced its decision not to sell the GI business. The proceeds of the sale (announced on 21 March 2013) were envisaged to be a part of the Group's planned £1 billion contribution to the recapitalisation of The Co-operative Bank. The revised terms of the Recapitalisation Plan, as set out on 4 November 2013, involve a smaller Group contribution and have allowed the Group, as part of its wider strategic review, to reconsider its plans. The Co-operative Group no longer owns any part of the former Bank.

In 2020, Co-operative Group sold the insurance underwriting business, CIS General Insurance Limited, for £185million, leaving the Co-op name as a marketing and distribution brand only. The underwriting business was renamed Soteria Insurance Limited following the sale.

== Operations ==
The Society's head office on Miller Street in Manchester city centre was, at the time of completion in 1962, the tallest building in Europe, standing at 387 feet (118 m). Since the opening of the Beetham Tower in 2006, it is now the second tallest building in Manchester. In 2006, using a government subsidy, the CIS Tower was clad in solar panels due to a large number of 1960's tiles falling off the building, becoming Europe's largest vertical solar array.

Co-op Insurance currently offers business, home, motor, travel and pet insurance products. Pet insurance is provided, underwritten and administered by Allianz Insurance, part of the Allianz (UK) Group. HomeRescue Plus, motor breakdown et cover and accident recovery service are provided on behalf of Co-op Insurance by AXA Assistance (UK).

The Co-op Insurance has a tradition of football sponsorship. It has previously sponsored the Scottish League Cup in Scotland and the Irish League Cup in Northern Ireland.

== Membership ==
Members of The Co-operative Group and participating regional societies earn membership points on the products they hold. Points are converted into dividend at a rate agreed annually by the Board. A decision made by the Coop meaning Coop members will not earn 2p per £1 spend from 24th Jan 24.

== Awards and recognition ==
=== British Insurance Awards ===
Co-op Insurance has been recognised at the British Insurance Awards, a leading event in the UK insurance industry.

- 2023: Won Personal Lines Broker of the Year
- 2025: Won The Customer Experience Award

=== UK Customer Experience Awards ===
Co-op Insurance has been recognised at the UK Customer Experience Awards, a national programme celebrating excellence in customer experience.

- 2024: Won Customers at the Heart of Everything – Financial Services (Gold) and Best Digital CX (Gold)

== See also ==
- Co-op Insurance Society Ltd v Argyll Stores Holdings Ltd
