= Marrack Goulding =

British diplomat; Under-Secretary-General of the United Nations

Sir Marrack Goulding KCMG
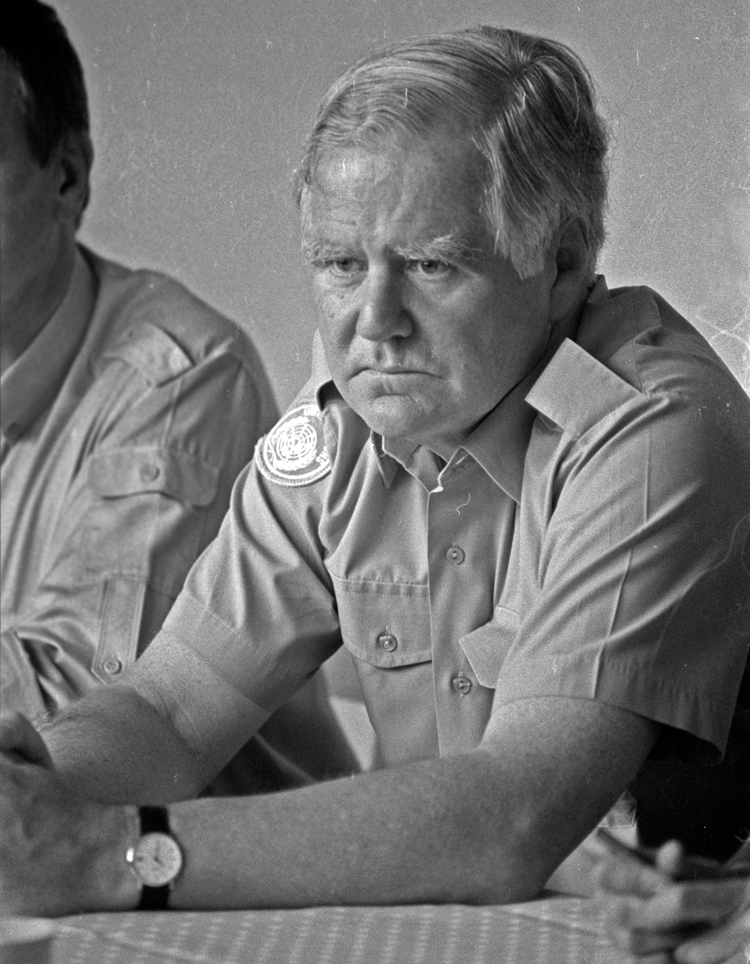
- Goulding in 1992

Under-Secretary-General of the United Nations
- In office 1 January 1986 – July 1997

Personal details
- Born: 2 September 1936 Plymouth, Devon, England
- Died: 9 July 2010 (aged 73)
- Education: St Paul's School; Magdalen College, Oxford

Sir Marrack Goulding KCMG (2 September 1936 – 9 July 2010) was a British diplomat who served more than eleven years as Under-Secretary-General of the United Nations.

== Early life ==
Born in Plymouth in Devon, England, to Sir Irvine Goulding, a High Court judge. Goulding attended St Paul's School in London and later studied Literae Humaniores at Magdalen College, Oxford.

== Career ==
=== HM Diplomatic Service ===
Goulding entered HM Diplomatic Service in 1959 and was, in 1961, posted to the British Embassy in Kuwait. He returned to the United Kingdom in 1964, where he worked in the Foreign and Commonwealth Office. In 1968, he was once more posted overseas, as the Head of Chancery of the British Embassy in Tripoli, Libya, and later of the Embassy in Cairo, Egypt.

Goulding spent the following few years in the UK, working first in the Foreign Office as Private Secretary to three Ministers of State for Foreign and Commonwealth Affairs – including Roy Hattersley and Julian Amery, Baron Amery of Lustleigh – and then in the Cabinet Office. He was posted to the British Embassy in Lisbon, Portugal, in 1977, and to the United Kingdom Mission to the United Nations in New York City in 1979. In 1983, he was appointed Ambassador for the United Kingdom to Angola and São Tomé and Príncipe, and served in this capacity until 1985.

=== United Nations ===
On 1 January 1986, Goulding became Under-Secretary-General (USG) of the United Nations for Special Political Affairs, serving under Secretary-General Javier Pérez de Cuéllar. From then until March 1993, he headed peacekeeping operations for the UN, and presided over the creation of the Department of Peacekeeping Operations in 1992, during the term of Secretary-General Boutros Boutros-Ghali. According to Simon Chesterman of the New York University School of Law, the period of Goulding's service as head of UN peacekeeping – which saw the initiation of sixteen new missions – "may come to be regarded as its heyday".

In March 1993, Goulding became USG for Political Affairs. During his tenure at the UN, which ended in July 1997 during the first term of Secretary-General Kofi Annan, he was "effectively the second most powerful man in the UN".

=== St Antony's College, Oxford ===
Goulding became Warden of St Antony's College at the University of Oxford on 1 October 1997, having been appointed in November of the previous year. He held this position until his retirement on 30 September 2006.

== Post-UN political activities ==
Goulding was one of 52 former British diplomats who, in 2004, signed a letter criticising British policy in the Middle East. While the government discounted the criticisms raised in the letter, Goulding suggested that the opinions expressed therein were also held by current employees of the Foreign Office.

He had also, on a separate occasion, called for the withdrawal of American military forces from Iraq and the transfer of authority over security operations to a UN-sanctioned multinational force from Arab and Muslim countries.

== Publications ==
Goulding was the author of Peacemonger (2003), an account of the inner workings of the United Nations and its activities during his tenure. He has also published articles in various academic journals, including African Affairs and International Affairs.

Goulding was a recipient of the Duke of Westminster's Medal for Military Literature, awarded by the Royal United Services Institute for authorship of books that make "a notable and original contribution to the study of international and national security and defence".

== See also ==
- History of the United Nations
- List of United Nations peacekeeping missions
- Timeline of United Nations peacekeeping missions

Preceded by Brian Urquhart	Under-Secretary-General of the United Nations for Special Political Affairs; 1985–1992	Office split between Under-Secretaries-General for Political Affairs and Peacekeeping Operations
