= Hodgson v NALGO =

- Court: High Court
- Citation: [1972] 1 WLR 130

Court membership
- Judge sitting: Goulding J

Keywords
- Trade union, governance

Hodgson v National and Local Government Officers' Association [1972] 1 WLR 130 is a UK labour law case, concerning the governance of trade unions in the United Kingdom.

== Facts ==
NALGO’s 1971 conference decided it opposed EEC entry unless it can be shown to be in Britain and the Community’s interests. But then the National Executive Committee of the union directed NALGO delegates to support a motion at the TUC annual conference for joining, or oppose motions against joining. Members of the Leeds branch sought an injunction because under the union constitution the conference ‘directed’ the ‘general policy’.

== Judgment ==
Goulding J upheld the application. He noted it was not within an exception to Foss v Harbottle. But then he said that...

... should not be applied if the result may be to deprive the majority of an opportunity of carrying out their will. In other words, if the constitutional machinery of the body cannot operate in time to be of practical effect, the court, in my view, should entertain the suit of a member or members not supported by the association itself.

== See also ==
- UK labour law
