= Ebrahimi v Westbourne Galleries Ltd =

1973 UK company law case

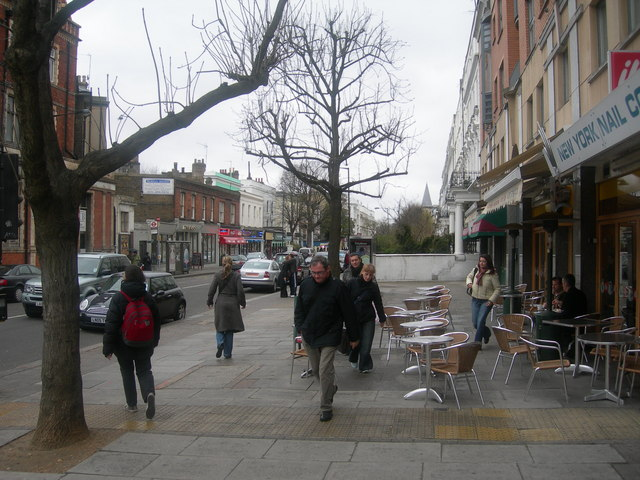
- Court: House of Lords
- Citation: [1973] AC 360, [1972] 2 All ER 492

Keywords
- Winding up petition

Ebrahimi v Westbourne Galleries Ltd [1973] AC 360 is a United Kingdom company law case on the rights of minority shareholders. The case was decided in the House of Lords.

== Facts ==
Mr Ebrahimi and Mr Nazar were partners. They decided to incorporate as the business was highly successful, buying and selling expensive rugs. Their store was originally in Nottingham, and then moved to London at 220 Westbourne Grove.

Mr Ebrahimi and Mr Nazar were the sole shareholders in the company. All profits were paid as directorial compensation. No dividends were ever issued. A few years later, when Mr Nazar's son came of age, he was appointed to the board of directors and Mr Ebrahimi and Mr Nazar both transferred shares to him.

After a falling out between the directors Mr Nazar and son called a company meeting, at which they passed an ordinary resolution to have Mr Ebrahimi removed as a director. Mr Ebrahimi, clearly unhappy at this, applied to the court for a remedy to have the company wound up.

== Judgment ==
The House of Lords stated that as a company is a separate legal person, the court would not normally entertain such an application. However, they believed that as the company was so similar in its operation as it was when it was a partnership, they created what is now known as a quasi-partnership. Mr Ebrahimi had a legitimate expectation that his management function would continue and that the articles would not be used against him in this way. Based on the personal relationship between the parties it would be inequitable to allow Mr Nazar and his son to use their rights against Mr Ebrahimi so as to force him out of the company and so it was just and equitable to wind it up. The company was wound up and Mr Ebrahimi received his capital interest.

Lord Wilberforce gave the following judgment.

The real starting point is the Scottish decision in Symington v. Symington's Quarries Ltd (1905) 8 F. 121 . There had been a partnership business carried on by two brothers who decided to transfer it to a private limited company. Each brother was to hold half the shares except for a small holding for a third brother to hold balance for voting. A resolution was passed in general meeting by the votes of one brother together with other members having nominal interests that he should be sole director. The other two brothers petitioned for a winding up under the just and equitable provision and the court so ordered. The reasons for so doing, given by some of their Lordships of the First Division, are expressed in terms of lost substratum or deadlock - words clearly used in a general rather than a technical sense. The judgment of Lord M'Laren, which has proved to be the most influential as regards later cases, puts the ground more generally. He points out, at p. 130, that the company was not formed by appeal to the public: it was a domestic company, the only real partners being the three brothers:

'In such a case it is quite obvious that all the reasons that apply to the dissolution of private companies, on the grounds of incompatibility between the views or methods of the partners, would be applicable in terms to the division amongst the shareholders of this company, ...'

In England, the leading authority is the Court of Appeal's decision in In re Yenidje Tobacco Co. Ltd. [1916] 2 Ch. 426 . This was a case of two equal director shareholders, with an arbitration provision in the articles, between whom a state of deadlock came into existence. It has often been argued, and was so in this House, that its authority is limited to true deadlock cases. I could, in any case, not be persuaded that the words 'just and equitable' need or can be confined to such situations. But Lord Cozens-Hardy M.R. clearly puts his judgment on wider grounds. Whether there is deadlock or not, he says, at p. 432, the circumstances

'are such that we ought to apply, if necessary, the analogy of the partnership law and to say that this company is now in a state which could not have been contemplated by the parties when the company was formed ...'

Warrington L.J. adopts the same principle, treating deadlock as an example only of the reasons why it would be just and equitable to wind the company up.

In 1924, these authorities were reviewed, approved and extended overseas by the Judicial Committee of the Privy Council in an appeal from the West Indian Court of Appeal (Barbados), Loch v. John Blackwood Ltd [1924] A.C. 783 . The judgment of the Board delivered by Lord Shaw of Dunfermline clearly endorses, if not enlarges, the width to be given to the just and equitable clause. The case itself was one of a domestic company and was not one of deadlock. One of the directors had given grounds for loss of confidence in his probity and (a matter echoed in the present case) had shown that he regarded the business as his own. His Lordship quotes with approval from the judgments of Lord M'Laren in Symington v. Symington's Quarries Ltd, 8 F. 121 and of Lord Cozens-Hardy M.R. in In re Yenidje Tobacco Co. Ltd. [1916] 2 Ch. 426 .

I note in passing the Scottish case of Thomson v. Drysdale 1925 S.C. 311 where a winding up was ordered under the just and equitable clause at the instance of a holder of one share against the only other shareholder who held 1,501 shares, clearly not a case of deadlock, and come to In re Cuthbert Cooper & Sons Ltd [1937] Ch. 392, a case which your Lordships must consider. The respondents relied on this case which carries the authority of Simonds J. as restricting the force of the just and equitable provision. The company was clearly a family company, the capital in which belonged to a father and his two elder sons. After the death of the father leaving his shares to his younger sons and appointing them his executors, his elder sons, exercising the powers given to directors by the articles, refused to register the executors as shareholders and dismissed them from employment. The executors' petition for winding up of the company was dismissed. My Lords, with respect for the eminent judge who decided it, I must doubt the correctness of this. Whether on the facts stated a case of justice and equity was made out is no doubt partly a question of fact on which, even though my own view is clear enough, I should respect the opinion of the trial judge; but, this matter apart, I am unable to agree as to the undue emphasis he puts on the contractual rights arising from the articles, over the equitable principles which might be derived from partnership law, for in the result the latter seem to have been entirely excluded in the former's favour. I think that the case should no longer be regarded as of authority.

There are three recent cases which I should mention since they have figured in the judgments below. In re Lundie Brothers Ltd [1965] 1 W.L.R. 1051 was, like the present, a decision of Plowman J. This was a case where the petitioner, one of three shareholders and directors, was excluded from participation in the management and from directors' remuneration. Plowman J. applying partnership principles made a winding up order under the just and equitable clause. If that decision was right it assists the present appellant. The Court of Appeal in the present case disagreed with it and overruled it, in so far as it related to a winding up. The respondent argues that this was the first case where exclusion of a working director, valid under the articles, had been treated as a ground for winding up under the just and equitable clause and that as such it was an unjustifiable innovation.

In re Expanded Plugs Ltd [1966] 1 W.L.R. 514 was, on the other hand, approved by the Court of Appeal in the present case. The case itself is a paradigm of obscure forensic tactics and, as such, of merely curious interest; its only importance lies in the statement, contained in the judgment, at p. 523, that since the relevant decisions were carried out within the framework of the articles the petitioner must show that they were not carried out bona fide in the interests of the company. I shall return, in so far as it limits the scope of the just and equitable provision, to this principle but I should say at once that I disagree with it.

In In re K/9 Meat Supplies (Guildford) Ltd [1966] 1 W.L.R. 1112 there was a company of three shareholder/directors one of whom became bankrupt; the petitioner was his trustee in bankruptcy. It was contended that the company was a quasi-partnership and that since section 33 of the Partnership Act 1890 provides for dissolution on the bankruptcy of one of the partners a winding up order on this ground should be made. Pennycuick J. rejected this argument on the ground that, since the 'partnership' had been transformed into a company and since the articles gave no automatic right to a winding up on bankruptcy, bankruptcy of one member was not a ground for winding up of itself. He then proceeded to consider whether the just and equitable provision should be applied. In my opinion, this procedure was correct and I need not express an opinion whether, on the facts, it was right to refuse an order.

Finally I should refer to the Scottish case of Lewis v. Haas, 1970 S.L.T. (Notes) 67 where the two main shareholder/directors each held 49 per cent. of the shares, the remaining 2 per cent. being held by a solicitor. Lord Fraser, in the Outer House, while accepting the principle that exclusion from management might be a ground for ordering a winding up, did not find the facts sufficient to support the use of the just and equitable clause.

This series of cases (and there are others: In re Davis & Collett Ltd [1935] Ch. 693; Baird v. Lees, 1924 S.C. 83; Elder v. Elder & Watson, 1952 S.C. 49; In re Swaledale Cleaners Ltd [1968] 1 W.L.R. 1710; In re Fildes Bros. Ltd. [1970] 1 W.L.R. 592; In re Leadenhall General Hardware Stores Ltd (unreported), February 4, 1971), amounts to a considerable body of authority in favour of the use of the just and equitable provision in a wide variety of situations, including those of expulsion from office. The principle has found acceptance in a number of Commonwealth jurisdictions. Though these were not cited at the Bar I refer to some of them since they usefully illustrate the principle which has been held to underlie this jurisdiction and show it applicable to exclusion cases.

In In re Straw Products Pty. Ltd [1942] V.L.R. 222 Mann C.J. said, at p. 223:

'All that Hinds has done in the past in exercise of his control has been within his legal powers. The question is whether he has used those powers in such a way as to make it just and equitable that Robertson should be allowed by the court to retire from the partnership. The analogy of a partnership seems to me to clarify discussion.'

In re Wondoflex Textiles Pty. Ltd. [1951] V.L.R. 458 was a case where again the company was held to resemble a partnership. The petitioner, owner of a quarter share, was removed from office as director by the governing director exercising powers under the articles. Thus the issue, and the argument, closely resembled those in the present case. The judgment of Smith J. contains the following passage, at p. 467:

'It is also true, I think, that, generally speaking, a petition for winding up, based upon the partnership analogy, cannot succeed if what is complained of is merely a valid exercise of powers conferred in terms by the articles: ... To hold otherwise would enable a member to be relieved from the consequences of a bargain knowingly entered into by him: ... But this, I think, is subject to an important qualification. Acts which, in law, are a valid exercise of powers conferred by the articles may nevertheless be entirely outside what can fairly be regarded as having been in the contemplation of the parties when they became members of the company; and in such cases the fact that what has been done is not in excess of power will not necessarily be an answer to a claim for winding up. Indeed, it may be said that one purpose of [the just and equitable provision] is to enable the court to relieve a party from his bargain in such cases.'

The whole judgment is of value. In New Zealand, the Court of Appeal has endorsed the potential application of the principle to exclusion cases: Tench v. Tench Bros. Ltd. [1930] N.Z.L.R. 403; see also In re Modern Retreading Co. Ltd. [1962] E.A. 57, also a case of exclusion from management, and cf. In re Sydney and Whitney Pier Bus Service Ltd. [1944] 3 D.L.R. 468 and In re Concrete Column Clamps Ltd. [1953] 4 D.L.R. 60 (Quebec).

My Lords, in my opinion these authorities represent a sound and rational development of the law which should be endorsed. The foundation of it all lies in the words 'just and equitable' and, if there is any respect in which some of the cases may be open to criticism, it is that the courts may sometimes have been too timorous in giving them full force. The words are a recognition of the fact that a limited company is more than a mere legal entity, with a personality in law of its own: that there is room in company law for recognition of the fact that behind it, or amongst it, there are individuals, with rights, expectations and obligations inter se which are not necessarily submerged in the company structure. That structure is defined by the Companies Act and by the articles of association by which shareholders agree to be bound. In most companies and in most contexts, this definition is sufficient and exhaustive, equally so whether the company is large or small. The 'just and equitable' provision does not, as the respondents suggest, entitle one party to disregard the obligation he assumes by entering a company, nor the court to dispense him from it. It does, as equity always does, enable the court to subject the exercise of legal rights to equitable considerations; considerations, that is, of a personal character arising between one individual and another, which may make it unjust, or inequitable, to insist on legal rights, or to exercise them in a particular way.

It would be impossible, and wholly undesirable, to define the circumstances in which these considerations may arise. Certainly the fact that a company is a small one, or a private company, is not enough. There are very many of these where the association is a purely commercial one, of which it can safely be said that the basis of association is adequately and exhaustively laid down in the articles. The superimposition of equitable considerations requires something more, which typically may include one, or probably more, of the following elements: (i) an association formed or continued on the basis of a personal relationship, involving mutual confidence - this element will often be found where a pre-existing partnership has been converted into a limited company; (ii) an agreement, or understanding, that all, or some (for there may be 'sleeping' members), of the shareholders shall participate in the conduct of the business; (iii) restriction upon the transfer of the members' interest in the company - so that if confidence is lost, or one member is removed from management, he cannot take out his stake and go elsewhere.

== Significance ==
Soon after the remedy for unfair prejudice was introduced, which allows a court to simply order a minority shareholder to be bought out, rather than a company being wound up. This is found in the Companies Act 2006 sections 994 to 996.

== See also ==
- O'Neill v Phillips
- Unfair prejudice
