= O'Neill v Phillips =

1999 UK company law case

- Court: House of Lords
- Decided: 20 May 1999
- Citations: [1999] UKHL 24, [1999] 1 WLR 1092

Case opinions
- Lord Hoffmann

Keywords
- Unfair prejudice

O'Neill v Phillips [1999] UKHL 24 is a UK company law case on an action for unfair prejudice under s.459 Companies Act 1985 (now s.994 Companies Act 2006). It is the only case thus far in the House of Lords on the provision and it deals with the concept of members of a business having their "legitimate expectations" disappointed.

== Facts ==
Mr Phillips owned a company called Pectel Ltd. It specialised in stripping asbestos from buildings. Mr O'Neill started to work for the company in 1983. In 1985, Phillips was so impressed with O'Neill's work that he made him a director and gave him 25% of the shares. They had an informal chat in May 1985, and Mr Phillips said that one day, he hoped Mr O'Neill could take over the whole management, and would then be allowed to draw 50% of the company's profits. This happened, Phillips retired and O'Neill took over management. There were further talks about increasing O'Neill's actual shareholding to 50%, but this did not happen. After five years the construction industry went into decline, and so did the company. Phillips came back in and took business control. He demoted O'Neill to be a branch manager of the German operations and withdrew O'Neill's share of the profits. O'Neill was miffed. He started up his own competing company in Germany in 1990 and then he filed a petition for unfairly prejudicial conduct against Phillips, firstly, for the termination of equal profit-sharing and, secondly, for repudiating the alleged agreement for the allotment of more shares.

The judge rejected the petition on both grounds. There had been no firm agreement for an increase in shareholding, and it was not unfair for Phillips to keep a majority of company shares. Also, it was held that O'Neill suffered nothing in his capacity as a member of the company. His shares were unaffected. It was merely a dispute about his status as an employee. He had been well rewarded. In the Court of Appeal, Nourse LJ (with whom Potter and Mummery LJJ agreed) O'Neill won his appeal. Nourse LJ said that in fact Phillips had created a legitimate expectation for the shares in future. Moreover, a global view of the relationship should be taken, and so O'Neill did suffer as a member. On further appeal to the House of Lords, the Court of Appeal was overturned, and Phillips won.

== Judgment ==
Lord Hoffmann gave the leading judgment, with which Lords Jauncey, Clyde, Hutton and Hobhouse concurred. The most important feature of the case was that Mr Phillips had never actually agreed to transfer Mr O'Neill the shares of the company, so it could not be unfair that he had decided not to, because he had never decided to actually do so. Lord Hoffmann also recanted on his previous use of the terminology of "legitimate expectations". "I meant that it could exist only when equitable principles... would make it unfair for a party to exercise rights under the articles." As to capacity, although irrelevant after deciding that there had been no agreement, disagreeing with the first instance judge, Lord Hoffmann pointed out that O'Neill may have had a claim in his capacity of shareholder (rather than just an employee) because he had invested his money and his time into the company.

5. "Unfairly prejudicial"

In section 459 Parliament has chosen fairness as the criterion by which the court must decide whether it has jurisdiction to grant relief. It is clear from the legislative history (which I discussed in In re Saul D. Harrison & Sons Plc. [1995] 1 B.C.L.C. 14, 17-20) that it chose this concept to free the court from technical considerations of legal right and to confer a wide power to do what appeared just and equitable. But this does not mean that the court can do whatever the individual judge happens to think fair. The concept of fairness must be applied judicially and the content which it is given by the courts must be based upon rational principles. As Warner J. said in In re J. E. Cade & Son Ltd. [1992] B.C.L.C. 213, 227: "The court . . . has a very wide discretion, but it does not sit under a palm tree."

Although fairness is a notion which can be applied to all kinds of activities, its content will depend upon the context in which it is being used. Conduct which is perfectly fair between competing businessmen may not be fair between members of a family. In some sports it may require, at best, observance of the rules, in others ("it's not cricket") it may be unfair in some circumstances to take advantage of them. All is said to be fair in love and war. So the context and background are very important.

In the case of section 459, the background has the following two features. First, a company is an association of persons for an economic purpose, usually entered into with legal advice and some degree of formality. The terms of the association are contained in the articles of association and sometimes in collateral agreements between the shareholders. Thus the manner in which the affairs of the company may be conducted is closely regulated by rules to which the shareholders have agreed. Secondly, company law has developed seamlessly from the law of partnership, which was treated by equity, like the Roman societas, as a contract of good faith. One of the traditional roles of equity, as a separate jurisdiction, was to restrain the exercise of strict legal rights in certain relationships in which it considered that this would be contrary to good faith. These principles have, with appropriate modification, been carried over into company law.

The first of these two features leads to the conclusion that a member of a company will not ordinarily be entitled to complain of unfairness unless there has been some breach of the terms on which he agreed that the affairs of the company should be conducted. But the second leads to the conclusion that there will be cases in which equitable considerations make it unfair for those conducting the affairs of the company to rely upon their strict legal powers. Thus unfairness may consist in a breach of the rules or in using the rules in a manner which equity would regard as contrary to good faith.

This approach to the concept of unfairness in section 459 runs parallel to that which your Lordships' House, in In re Westbourne Galleries Ltd. [1973] A.C. 360, adopted in giving content to the concept of "just and equitable" as a ground for winding up. After referring to cases on the equitable jurisdiction to require partners to exercise their powers in good faith, Lord Wilberforce said, at p. 379:

"The words ['just and equitable'] are a recognition of the fact that a limited company is more than a mere legal entity, with a personality in law of its own: that there is room in company law for recognition of the fact that behind it, or amongst it, there are individuals, with rights, expectations and obligations inter se which are not necessarily submerged in the company structure. That structure is defined by the Companies Act [1948] and by the articles of association by which shareholders agree to be bound. In most companies and in most contexts, this definition is sufficient and exhaustive, equally so whether the company is large or small. The 'just and equitable' provision does not, as the respondents [the company] suggest, entitle one party to disregard the obligation he assumes by entering a company, nor the court to dispense him from it. It does, as equity always does, enable the court to subject the exercise of legal rights to equitable considerations; considerations, that is, of a personal character arising between one individual and another, which may make it unjust, or inequitable, to insist on legal rights, or to exercise them in a particular way."

I would apply the same reasoning to the concept of unfairness in section 459. The Law Commission, in its report on Shareholder Remedies (Law Com. No. 246) (1997) (Cm. 3769), para. 4.11, p. 43 expresses some concern that defining the content of the unfairness concept in the way I have suggested might unduly limit its scope and that "conduct which would appear to be deserving of a remedy may be left unremedied. . ." In my view, a balance has to be struck between the breadth of the discretion given to the court and the principle of legal certainty. Petitions under section 459 are often lengthy and expensive. It is highly desirable that lawyers should be able to advise their clients whether or not a petition is likely to succeed. Lord Wilberforce, after the passage which I have quoted, said that it would be impossible "and wholly undesirable" to define the circumstances in which the application of equitable principles might make it unjust, or inequitable (or unfair) for a party to insist on legal rights or to exercise them in particular way. This of course is right. But that does not mean that there are no principles by which those circumstances may be identified. The way in which such equitable principles operate is tolerably well settled and in my view it would be wrong to abandon them in favour of some wholly indefinite notion of fairness.

...

19th century English law, with its division between law and equity, traditionally took the view that while literal meanings might prevail in a court of law, equity could give effect to what it considered to have been the true intentions of the parties by preventing or restraining the exercise of legal rights. So Smith J. speaks of the exercise of the power being valid "in law" but its exercise not being just and equitable because contrary to the contemplation of the parties. This way of looking at the matter is a product of English legal history which has survived the amalgamation of the courts of law and equity. But another approach, in a different legal culture, might be simply to take a less literal view of "legal" construction and interpret the articles themselves in accordance with what Page-Wood V.-C. called "the plain general meaning of the deed." Or one might, as in Continental systems, achieve the same result by introducing a general requirement of good faith into contractual performance. These are all different ways of doing the same thing. I do not suggest there is any advantage in abandoning the traditional English theory, even though it is derived from arrangements for the administration of justice which were abandoned over a century ago. On the contrary, a new and unfamiliar approach could only cause uncertainty. So I agree with Jonathan Parker J. when he said in In re Astec (B.S.R.) Plc. [1998] 2 B.C.L.C. 556, 588:

"in order to give rise to an equitable constraint based on 'legitimate expectation' what is required is a personal relationship or personal dealings of some kind between the party seeking to exercise the legal right and the party seeking to restrain such exercise, such as will affect the conscience of the former."

This is putting the matter in very traditional language, reflecting in the word "conscience" the ecclesiastical origins of the long-departed Court of Chancery. As I have said, I have no difficulty with this formulation. But I think that one useful cross-check in a case like this is to ask whether the exercise of the power in question would be contrary to what the parties, by words or conduct, have actually agreed. Would it conflict with the promises which they appear to have exchanged? In Blisset v. Daniel the limits were found in the "general meaning" of the partnership articles themselves. In a quasi-partnership company, they will usually be found in the understandings between the members at the time they entered into association. But there may be later promises, by words or conduct, which it would be unfair to allow a member to ignore. Nor is it necessary that such promises should be independently enforceable as a matter of contract. A promise may be binding as a matter of justice and equity although for one reason or another (for example, because in favour of a third party) it would not be enforceable in law.

I do not suggest that exercising rights in breach of some promise or undertaking is the only form of conduct which will be regarded as unfair for the purposes of section 459. For example, there may be some event which puts an end to the basis upon which the parties entered into association with each other, making it unfair that one shareholder should insist upon the continuance of the association. The analogy of contractual frustration suggests itself. The unfairness may arise not from what the parties have positively agreed but from a majority using its legal powers to maintain the association in circumstances to which the minority can reasonably say it did not agree: non haec in foedera veni. It is well recognised that in such a case there would be power to wind up the company on the just and equitable ground (see Virdi v. Abbey Leisure Ltd. [1990] B.C.L.C. 342) and it seems to me that, in the absence of a winding up, it could equally be said to come within section 459. But this form of unfairness is also based upon established equitable principles and it does not arise in this case.

6. Legitimate expectations.

In In re Saul D. Harrison & Sons Plc. [1995] 1 B.C.L.C. 14, 19, I used the term "legitimate expectation," borrowed from public law, as a label for the "correlative right" to which a relationship between company members may give rise in a case when, on equitable principles, it would be regarded as unfair for a majority to exercise a power conferred upon them by the articles to the prejudice of another member. I gave as an example the standard case in which shareholders have entered into association upon the understanding that each of them who has ventured his capital will also participate in the management of the company. In such a case it will usually be considered unjust, inequitable or unfair for a majority to use their voting power to exclude a member from participation in the management without giving him the opportunity to remove his capital upon reasonable terms. The aggrieved member could be said to have had a "legitimate expectation" that he would be able to participate in the management or withdraw from the company.

It was probably a mistake to use this term, as it usually is when one introduces a new label to describe a concept which is already sufficiently defined in other terms. In saying that it was "correlative" to the equitable restraint, I meant that it could exist only when equitable principles of the kind I have been describing would make it unfair for a party to exercise rights under the articles. It is a consequence, not a cause, of the equitable restraint. The concept of a legitimate expectation should not be allowed to lead a life of its own, capable of giving rise to equitable restraints in circumstances to which the traditional equitable principles have no application. That is what seems to have happened in this case.

7. Was Mr. Phillips unfair?

The Court of Appeal found that by 1991 the company had the characteristics identified by Lord Wilberforce in In re Westbourne Galleries Ltd. [1973] A.C. 360 as commonly giving rise to equitable restraints upon the exercise of powers under the articles. They were (1) an association formed or continued on the basis of a personal relationship involving mutual confidence, (2) an understanding that all, or some, of the shareholders shall participate in the conduct of the business and (3) restrictions on the transfer of shares, so that a member cannot take out his stake and go elsewhere. I agree. It follows that it would have been unfair of Mr. Phillips to use his voting powers under the articles to remove Mr. O'Neill from participation in the conduct of the business without giving him the opportunity to sell his interest in the company at a fair price. Although it does not matter, I should say that I do not think that this was the position when Mr. O'Neill first acquired his shares in 1985. He received them as a gift and an incentive and I do not think that in making that gift Mr. Phillips could be taken to have surrendered his right to dismiss Mr. O'Neill from the management without making him an offer for the shares. Mr. O'Neill was simply an employee who happened to have been given some shares. But over the following years the relationship changed. Mr. O'Neill invested his own profits in the company by leaving some on loan account and agreeing to part being capitalised as shares. He worked to build up the company's business. He guaranteed its bank account and mortgaged his house in support. In re H. R. Harmer [1959] 1 W.L.R. 62 shows that shareholders who receive their shares as a gift but afterwards work in the business may become entitled to enforce equitable restraints upon the conduct of the majority shareholder.

The difficulty for Mr. O'Neill is that Mr. Phillips did not remove him from participation in the management of the business. After the meeting on 4 November 1991 he remained a director and continued to earn his salary as manager of the business in Germany. The Court of Appeal held that he had been constructively removed by the behaviour of Mr. Phillips in the matter of equality of profits and shareholdings. So the question then becomes whether Mr. Phillips acted unfairly in respect of these matters.

To take the shareholdings first, the Court of Appeal said that Mr. O'Neill had a legitimate expectation of being allotted more shares when the targets were met. No doubt he did have such an expectation before 4 November and no doubt it was legitimate, or reasonable, in the sense that it reasonably appeared likely to happen. Mr. Phillips had agreed in principle, subject to the execution of a suitable document. But this is where I think that the Court of Appeal may have been misled by the expression "legitimate expectation." The real question is whether in fairness or equity Mr. O'Neill had a right to the shares. On this point, one runs up against what seems to me the insuperable obstacle of the judge's finding that Mr. Phillips never agreed to give them. He made no promise on the point. From which it seems to me to follow that there is no basis, consistent with established principles of equity, for a court to hold that Mr. Phillips was behaving unfairly in withdrawing from the negotiation. This would not be restraining the exercise of legal rights. It would be imposing upon Mr. Phillips an obligation to which he never agreed. Where, as here, parties enter into negotiations with a view to a transfer of shares on professional advice and subject to a condition that they are not to be bound until a formal document has been executed, I do not think it is possible to say that an obligation has arisen in fairness or equity at an earlier stage.

The same reasoning applies to the sharing of profits. The judge found as a fact that Mr. Phillips made no unconditional promise about the sharing of profits. He had said informally that he would share the profits equally while Mr. O'Neill managed the company and he himself did not have to be involved in day-to-day business. He deliberately retained control of the company and with it, as the judge said, the right to redraw Mr. O'Neill's responsibilities. This he did without objection in August 1991. The consequence was that he came back to running the business and Mr. O'Neill was no longer managing director. He had made no promise to share the profits equally in such circumstances and it was therefore not inequitable or unfair for him to refuse to carry on doing so.

...

9. Capacity in which prejudice suffered

The judge, it will be recalled, gave as one of his reasons for dismissing the petition the fact that any prejudice suffered by Mr. O'Neill was in his capacity as an employee rather than as a shareholder. The Court of Appeal's rejection of this reason was, I think, influenced by its view that Mr. O'Neill had been constructively expelled. In a case of expulsion, where the equitable restraint on the exercise of the power is based upon the terms upon which the petitioner became or continued as a member of the company, the prejudice will be suffered in the capacity of a member. It is the terms, agreement, or understanding on which he became associated as a member which generates the restraint on the power of expulsion. But the judge was considering only the prejudice suffered through not getting a half-share in the profits or the additional shares. It is somewhat unreal to deal with the capacity in which prejudice was suffered in these respects when there was no entitlement in law or equity in the first place. But assuming there had been a contractual obligation, I would not exclude the possibility that prejudice suffered from the breach of that obligation could be suffered in the capacity of shareholder. As I have said, the initial gift of 25 shares in 1985 did not in my view change the essential relationship between the parties. Mr. Phillips remained controlling shareholder and Mr. O'Neill remained an employee who had some shares. If at that stage Mr. Phillips had promised another 25 shares and then broken his promise, I do not think that Mr. O'Neill would have suffered prejudice in his capacity as an existing shareholder. I agree with the judge that the case would have been no different if Mr. O'Neill had had no shares and Mr. Phillips had broken a promise to give him 50. On the other hand, once Mr. O'Neill had invested his own money and effort in the company, the situation may have changed. A promise to give Mr. O'Neill more shares or a larger share in the profits may well have been based not merely upon his position as an employee but on the fact that he already had a stake in the company. As cases like R. & H. Electrical Ltd. v. Haden Bill Electrical Ltd. [1995] 2 B.C.L.C. 280 show, the requirement that prejudice must be suffered as a member should not be too narrowly or technically construed. But the point does not arise because no promise was made.

== See also ==
- UK company law
