= Barton v Armstrong =

1973 Privy Council case

- Court: Privy Council
- Full case name: Alexander Barton, Appellant v. Alexander Ewan Armstrong and Others, Respondents
- Decided: December 5, 1973
- Citations: [1973] UKPC 27, [1976] AC 104

Case history
- Prior action: Barton v Armstrong [1973] 2 NSWLR 598
- Appealed from: NSW Court of Appeal

Court membership
- Judges sitting: Lord Wilberforce, Lord Simon of Glaisdale, Lord Cross of Chelsea, Lord Kilbrandon, Sir Garfield Barwick

Case opinions
- Decision by: Lord Cross of Chelsea, Lord Kilbrandon and Sir Garfield Barwick

Keywords
- Duress

Barton v Armstrong is a Privy Council decision heard on appeal from the Court of Appeal of New South Wales, relating to duress and pertinent to case law under Australian and English contract law.

The Privy Council held that a person who agrees to a contract under physical duress may avoid the contract, even if the duress was not the main reason for agreeing to the bargain.

== Facts ==
Alexander Barton was the managing director of a company, Landmark Corporation Ltd., whose main business was property development, its projects passing through "Paradise Waters (Sales) Pty Ltd". Barton executed a deed whereby the company would pay $140,000 to Alexander Armstrong, a NSW state politician, and buy his shares for $180,000. Armstrong was the chairman of the board.

Street J found Armstrong had indeed threatened to have Barton killed. But the NSW Court of Appeal said that Barton failed to discharge the onus that the threat had caused him to make the contract.

== Advice ==
The Judicial Committee of the Privy Council advised that Barton could avoid the contract for being under duress, and it did not matter that he may have agreed to the deal anyway. [[[Geoffrey Cross, Baron Cross of Chelsea|Lord Cross of Chelsea]], Lord Kilbrandon and Sir Garfield Barwick held that physical duress does not need to be the main reason, it must merely be one reason amongst others for entering an agreement. Lord Cross said the same rule should apply for duress as in misrepresentation, "that if Armstrong's threats were a reason for Barton's executing the deed he is entitled to relief even though he might well have entered into the contract if Armstrong had uttered no threats to induce him to do so".

Lord Wilberforce and Lord Simon, dissenting jointly, held that while in substantial agreement on the law, there was no duress on the facts, but the threats needed to be at least a reason for entering the contract. They held the case

involves consideration of what the law regards as voluntary or its opposite ... Absence of choice ... does not negate consent in law; for this the pressure must be one of a kind which the law does not regard as legitimate. Thus, out of the various means by which consent may be obtained – advice, persuasion, influence, inducement, representation, commercial pressure – the law had come to select some which it will not accept as a reason for voluntary action: fraud, abuse of relation of confidence, undue influence, duress or coercion. In this the law, under the influence of equity, has developed from the old common law conception of duress – threat to life and limb – and it has arrived at the modern generalisation expressed by Holmes J – "subjected to an improper motive for action" (Fairbanks v Snow).

The three tests for physical duress … are to, first, "show that some illegitimate means of persuasion was used", and second, that "the illegitimate means used was a reason (not the reason, nor the predominant reason nor the clinching reason)", and third that his evidence is "honest and accepted".

== See also ==
- Crimes Act 1900, Section 61
- Lloyds Bank Ltd v Bundy [1975] QB 326
- Williams v. Walker-Thomas Furniture Co. 350 F.2d 445 (C.A. D.C. 1965)
- Astley v Reynolds (1731) 2 Str 915
- Skeate v Beale (1840) 11 AD & E 983 held unlawful detention of goods is not duress
