= Rock (Nominees) Ltd v RCO Holdings Ltd =

UK company law case

Rock Nominees Ltd v RCO (Holdings) plc
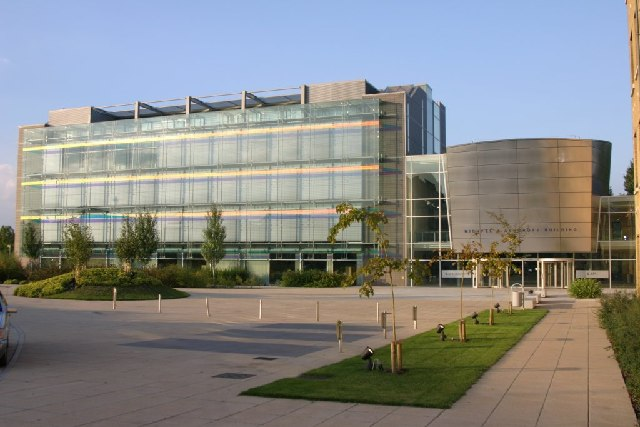
- Court: Court of Appeal
- Citation: [2004] EWCA Civ 118

Case history
- Prior actions: [2003] EWHC 936 (Ch), [2004] 1 BCLC 439, [2003] 2 BCLC 493

Rock Nominees Ltd v RCO (Holdings) plc [2004] EWCA Civ 118 is a UK company law case dealing with unfair prejudice under section 459 Companies Act 1985 (now section 994 Companies Act 2006). It was decided at first instance by Peter Smith J.

== Facts ==
Rock Nominees Ltd was part of the business empire of Lord Ashcroft, a Conservative life peer. It is a company which holds shares on behalf of other companies. It had 201,300 shares for Gambier Holdings Inc. (a British Virgin Islands company) and 65,000 shares for Kiwi Ltd. (a Belize company) invested in RCO (Holdings) plc. Its stake made up 2.48%. RCO itself was in the cleaning, catering and security porterage business. In 2000, ISS (UK) Ltd took over RCO, acquiring 96.4% of the shares. It made one of RCO's subsidiaries transfer its shares to one of ISS's subsidiaries for £30,117,784. Rock Nominee's filed for a petition of unfair prejudice on the grounds that this was a transaction at an undervalue. It did not reflect the value to the purchaser of the synergies arising from the sale or the value of avoiding risk from a sale on the open market.

== Judgment ==
=== High Court ===
Peter Smith J, in a lengthy judgment held that the petition would be refused. Although some of the conduct by RCO constituted a breach of fiduciary duty, Rock Nominees had not discharged the burden of proof to show that the shares were transferred at an undervalue. The evidence suggested, including a report from a financial expert that Rock Nominees called, that the price did reflect a premium for "synergies". Moreover, Peter Smith J was inclined to draw adverse inferences from some of the murkier omissions in the evidence that Lord Ashcroft had given.

Euphemistically this practice — which I understand is a not unheard of practice in the City — is described as "greenmail". The proper word to my mind is blackmail. It is the kind of thing which brings the City into disrepute ... Where matters are dealt with in speculation and profits are made, which are then gathered offshore, when there is no merit and no exposure to the kind of risks associated with companies, that to my mind is not legitimate.

=== Court of Appeal ===
Potter LJ, Jonathan Parker LJ and Sir Swinton Thomas dismissed the appeal. They held that although the directors had breached their fiduciary duties, Rock Nominees had not suffered prejudice because the best price had been achieved. ROC could not have compelled ISS (UK) Ltd to pay more because only ISS (UK) Ltd was attracted by the potential cost saving. Furthermore, as majority shareholder ISS (UK) Ltd was able to place RCO in members' voluntary liquidation and at any time force a sale of assets on the open market.

== See also ==
For the full case see http://www.bailii.org/ew/cases/EWCA/Civ/2004/118.html

- UK company law
- Unfair prejudice
- Greenmail
- RCO Support Services v Unison [2002] EWCA Civ 464
