= Lennie Hoffmann, Baron Hoffmann =

British and South African judge (born 1934)

The Right Honourable The Lord Hoffmann GBS PC
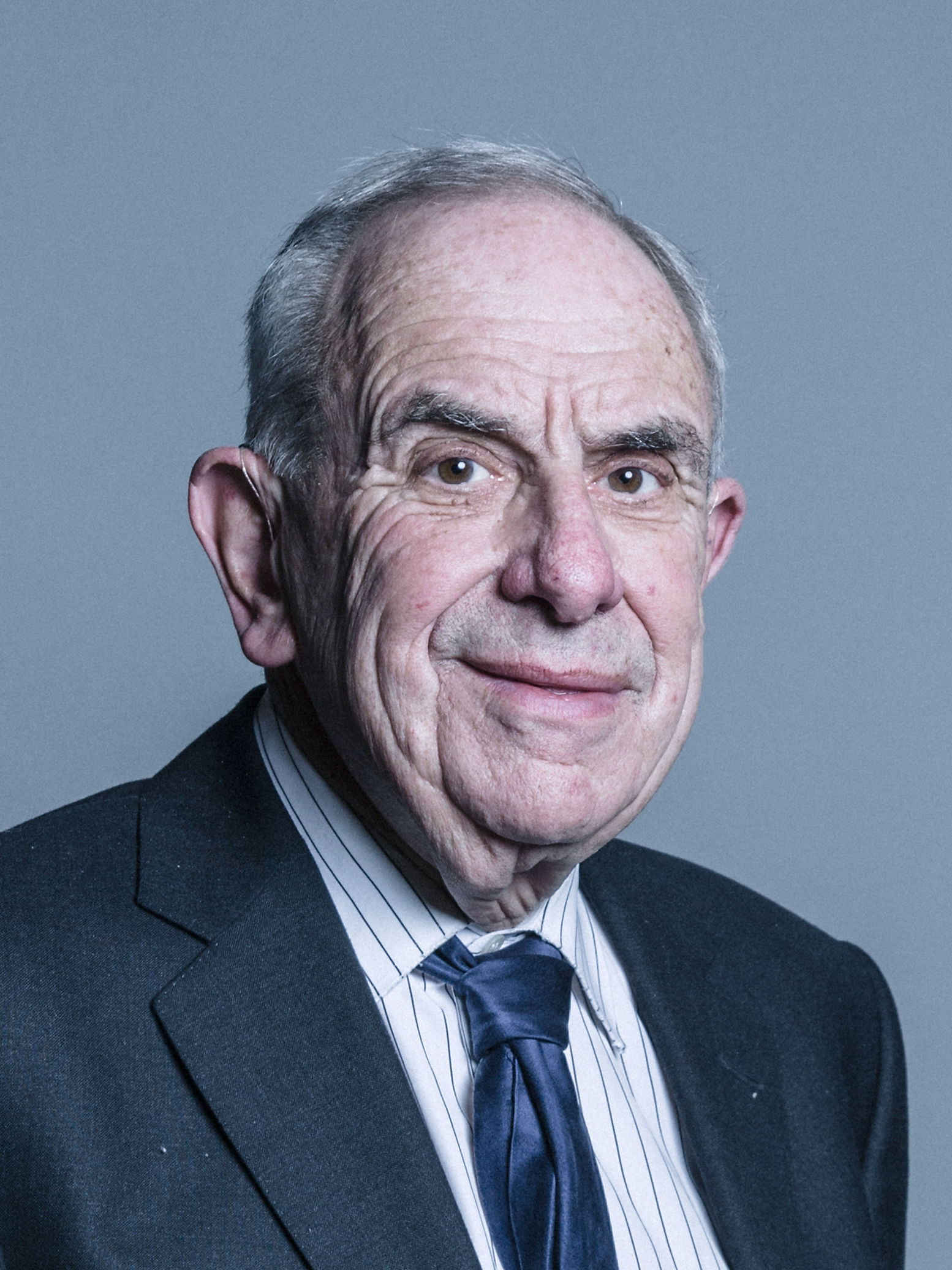
- Hoffmann in 2018

Second Senior Lord of Appeal in Ordinary
- In office 10 January 2007 – 21 April 2009
- Monarch: Elizabeth II
- Preceded by: The Lord Nicholls of Birkenhead
- Succeeded by: The Lord Hope of Craighead

Lord of Appeal in Ordinary
- In office 21 February 1995 – 21 April 2009
- Succeeded by: The Lord Collins of Mapesbury

Non-Permanent Judge of the Court of Final Appeal of Hong Kong
- Incumbent
- Assumed office 12 January 1998
- Appointed by: Tung Chee-hwa

Member of the House of Lords
- Lord Temporal
- Lord of Appeal in Ordinary; 21 February 1995

Personal details
- Born: Leonard Hubert Hoffmann; 8 May 1934 (age 92) Cape Town, Union of South Africa
- Spouse(s): Gillian, Lady Hoffmann
- Children: 2
- Education: University of Cape Town; The Queen's College, Oxford
- Occupation: Jurist

Chinese name
- Chinese: 賀輔明
Transcriptions
Yue: Cantonese
- Yale Romanization: Hoh Fuh Mìhng
- Jyutping: Ho^{6} Fu^{6} Ming^{4}

Leonard Hubert "Lennie" Hoffmann, Baron Hoffmann GBS PC (born 8 May 1934) is a senior South African–British judge. Currently, he serves as a Non-Permanent Judge of the Court of Final Appeal of Hong Kong; he formerly served as a Lord of Appeal in Ordinary from 1995 to 2009.

Hoffmann has had a large impact on the interpretation of contracts, shareholder actions in UK company law, in restricting tort liability for public authorities, human rights and intellectual property law, in particular patents.

== Early life ==
Born on 8 May 1934, Leonard Hubert Hoffmann was a member of a Jewish family in Oranjezicht, overlooking Cape Town, South Africa. His grandparents established the family there in the late 1800s, having immigrated from Eastern Europe. His father was a well-known solicitor who co-founded what has become Africa's largest law firm, Edward Nathan Sonnenbergs.

== Education ==
Hoffmann was educated at the University of Cape Town and then attended The Queen's College, Oxford, as a Rhodes Scholar, where he studied for the BCL degree and won the Vinerian Scholarship.

Between 1961 and 1973, he was Stowell Civil Law Fellow at University College, Oxford, where he is an Honorary Fellow.

== Legal career ==
Hoffmann became a barrister in 1973. His first client was a law student who had been evicted from his lodgings.

In 1963, he published the first edition of The South African Law of Evidence, a work which became the standard text and which has since been published in four editions. After being called to the Bar from Gray's Inn in 1964, Hoffmann became one of the most sought after and highly priced barristers of his generation and was quickly made a judge, having taken silk on 19 April 1977.

== Judicial career ==
Hoffmann was appointed to the Courts of Appeal of Jersey and Guernsey on 20 November 1980 and stayed in office until 1985. He was also appointed to the High Court of Justice, Chancery Division from 1985 to 1992. On 23 July 1985, he was knighted upon his appointment, as is customary for High Court judges.

He was subsequently appointed to be a Lord Justice of Appeal on 1 October 1992 and stayed in office until 1995. In 1995, Hoffmann was appointed a Lord of Appeal in Ordinary (more commonly known as a Law Lord) and thereby raised to the peerage as Baron Hoffmann, of Chedworth in the County of Gloucestershire.

Twinsectra v Yardley (trust law) and MacNiven v Westmoreland (tax law) are prominent examples of his judicial positions. Both cases led to differences of view between him and Lord Millett. Hoffmann gave the leading judgment in Investors Compensation Scheme Ltd v West Bromwich Building Society, in which he set out five principles for interpreting contracts.

He retired as a Law Lord on 20 April 2009 and joined the Centre for Commercial Law Studies, Queen Mary, University of London, as Honorary Professor of Intellectual Property Law.

=== Hong Kong Court of Final Appeal ===
Hoffmann has been a Non-Permanent Judge of the Hong Kong Court of Final Appeal since 1998.

In 2014 he was awarded the Gold Bauhinia Star by the Chief Executive of Hong Kong.

=== Links with Amnesty International ===
Hoffmann's failure to declare his links with Amnesty International before ruling on whether Augusto Pinochet was immune from prosecution led to the unprecedented setting aside of a House of Lords judgment. He later commented to The Daily Telegraph that "the fact is I'm not biased. I am a lawyer. I do things as a judge. The fact that my wife works as a secretary for Amnesty International is, as far as I am concerned, neither here nor there."

== Personal life ==
Leonard and Gillian (Sterner) Hoffmann have two daughters and two grandchildren. They were married at Cape Town Synagogue in the late 1950s. As of 1999, the Hoffmanns lived in Hampstead, London, and spent weekends in Chedworth.

Hoffmann is an avid cyclist and opera-goer. He has also been involved in various charities through these interests.

== Opinions in terrorism cases ==
Hoffmann was involved in three important judgments of the House of Lords concerning terrorism: Secretary of State for the Home Department v Rehman [2001] UKHL 47; A v Secretary of State for the Home Department [2004] UKHL 56; and A v. Secretary of State for the Home Department [2005] UKHL 71. In Rehman, at para 62, he wrote:

Postscript. I wrote this speech some three months before the recent events in New York and Washington. They are a reminder that in matters of national security, the cost of failure can be high. This seems to me to underline the need for the judicial arm of government to respect the decisions of ministers of the Crown on the question of whether support for terrorist activities in a foreign country constitutes a threat to national security. It is not only that the executive has access to special information and expertise in these matters. It is also that such decisions, with serious potential results for the community, require a legitimacy which can be conferred only by entrusting them to persons responsible to the community through the democratic process. If the people are to accept the consequences of such decisions, they must be made by persons whom the people have elected and whom they can remove.

It appeared that he was willing to defer to the executive in matters concerning national security in the fairly long tradition of English judges deferring to the executive in such matters, including Lord Denning in ex-parte Hosenball. However, in 2004, Hoffmann took a robust stand (joining the majority of judges in the decision) against the executive in the Belmarsh case, A v. SSHD [2004] UKHL 56. In this case Hoffmann wrote at para 97 that:

The real threat to the life of the nation, in the sense of a people living in accordance with its traditional laws and political values, comes not from terrorism but from laws such as these. That is the true measure of what terrorism may achieve. It is for Parliament to decide whether to give the terrorists such a victory.

In A v. Secretary of State for the Home Department [2005] UKHL 71, Hoffmann said:

The use of torture is dishonourable. It corrupts and degrades the state which uses it and the legal system which accepts it.

== Notable judgments ==
- Re Augustus Barnett & Son Ltd [1986] BCLC 170
- Improver v Remington [1990] FSR 181
- Nestle v National Westminster Bank plc [1992] EWCA Civ 12, [1993] 1 WLR 1260 - English trusts law concerning the duty of care when a trustee is making an investment; Hoffmann's decision supported on appeal
- Bishopsgate Investment Management Ltd v Maxwell (No 2) [1993] BCLC 814 - UK company law concerning a director's duty to act for proper purposes of the company.
- Re D'Jan of London Ltd [1994] 1 BCLC 561, [1993] BCC 646
- William Sindall plc v Cambridgeshire County Council [1994] 1 WLR 1016
- Re Saul D Harrison & Sons plc [1995] 1 BCLC 14, [1994] BCC 475
- Biogen Inc v Medeva plc [1997] RPC 1 [1996] UKHL 18
- South Australia Asset Management Corp v York Montague Ltd [1996] UKHL 10, [1997] AC 191
- Co-operative Insurance Society Ltd v Argyll Stores [1997] UKHL 17
- Investors Compensation Scheme Ltd v West Bromwich Building Society [1997] UKHL 28
- Banque Financiere de la Cite v Parc (Battersea) Ltd [1998] UKHL 7
- O'Neill v Phillips [1999] UKHL 24, [1999] 1 WLR 1092
- Bruton v London & Quadrant Housing Trust [2000] 1 AC 406
- Secretary of State for the Home Department v. Rehman [2001] UKHL 47
- Standard Chartered Bank v Pakistan National Shipping Corp [2003] 1 AC 959
- Kirin-Amgen v Hoechst Marion Roussel [2004] UKHL 46
- A v Secretary of State for the Home Department [2004] UKHL 56
- A v Secretary of State for the Home Department [2005] UKHL 71
- OBG Ltd v Allan [2007] UKHL 21, [2008] 1 AC 1, [2007] 2 WLR 920
- Transfield Shipping Inc v Mercator Shipping Inc or The Achilleas [2008] UKHL 48
- Attorney General of Belize v Belize Telecom Ltd [2009] UKPC 10

== Publications ==
A selection of his extra-judicial writings:

- "Anthropomorphic justice: The reasonable man and his friends" (2010) 29(2) The Law Teacher 127
- "Language and Lawyers" [2018] 134 Law Quarterly Review 553

Legal offices
Preceded by None	Non-Permanent Judge of the Court of Final Appeal of Hong Kong; 1998–present	Incumbent
Order of precedence
Previous: Patrick Chan; Non-Permanent Judge of the Court of Final Appeal	Hong Kong order of precedence Non-Permanent Judge of the Court of Final Appeal	Succeeded by Lord Neuberger; Non-Permanent Judge of the Court of Final Appeal
