= Re Saul D Harrison & Sons plc =

UK company law case

Re Saul D Harrison & Sons plc [1995] 1 BCLC 14, [1994] BCC 475, is a UK company law case on an action for unfair prejudice under s.459 Companies Act 1985 (now s.994 Companies Act 2006). It was decided in the Court of Appeal and deals with the concept of members of a business having their "legitimate expectations" disappointed. Vinelott J at first instance had denied the petition, and Hoffmann LJ, Neill LJ and Waite LJ in the Court of Appeal upheld the judgment.

== Facts ==
Saul D Harrison & Sons plc ran a business that was established in 1891 by the petitioner's great grandfather. It made industrial cleaning and wiping cloths, made from waste textiles. It operated from West Ham and after 1989 from Hackney. The petitioner had "class C" shares, which gave her rights to dividends and capital distribution in a liquidation. But she had no entitlement to vote, and the company had been running at a loss. She alleged that the directors (who were her cousins) had unfairly kept running the business just so they could pay themselves cushy salaries. Instead, she said, they should have closed down the business and distributed the assets to the shareholders.

== Judgment ==
On the facts, there was no unfairly prejudicial conduct. The board of directors were bound to manage the company in accordance with their fiduciary obligations, the articles of association and the Companies Act. The unfair prejudice action does protect certain legitimate expectations, akin to those which may affect one's conscience in equity, from being disappointed. But here there was no legitimate expectation for more than the duties discharged, and so no obligations had been breached.

== See also ==
- UK company law
