= Sky Petroleum Ltd v VIP Petroleum Ltd =

English contract law case on specific performance

Sky Petroleum v VIP Petroleum
- Court: High Court
- Citation: [1974] 1 WLR 576, [1974] 1 All ER 954

Case opinions
- Goulding J

Keywords
- Remedies, specific performance

Sky Petroleum v VIP Petroleum [1974] 1 WLR 576 is an English contract law case, concerning the possibility of claiming specific performance of a promise after breach of contract.

== Facts ==
VIP Petroleum had agreed to sell Sky Petroleum all their petrol and diesel needs at fixed prices and in a minimum annual quantity. With the 1973 oil crisis leading to severe shortages, Sky had no prospect of finding an alternative supply. But VIP terminated the contract on the ground Sky had exceeded the credit provisions in the contract. Sky sought an injunction for VIP to sell the petrol, rather than just pay damages, so that it could stay in business.

== Judgment ==
Goulding J held that while the general rule is that courts grant only damages for breach of contract to supply non-specific goods, the unusual state of the market made specific performance of supplying petrol the appropriate remedy. Damages were not adequate.

the court refuses specific performance of a contract to sell and purchase chattels not specific or ascertained... under the ordinary contract for the sale of non-specific goods, damages are a sufficient remedy... [However] the petroleum market is in an unusual state in which a would-be buyer cannot go out into the market and contract with another seller, possibly at some sacrifice to price. Here, the defendants appear for practical purposes to be the plaintiffs’ sole means of keeping their business going, and I am prepared so far to depart from the general rule as to try to preserve the position under the contract until a later date.

== See also ==
- English contract law
