= Specific performance =

Equitable remedy in contract law

Specific performance is an equitable remedy in the law of contract, in which a court issues an order requiring a party to perform a specific act, such as to complete performance of a contract. It is typically available in the sale of land law, but otherwise is not generally available if damages are an appropriate alternative. Specific performance is almost never available for contracts of personal service, although performance may also be ensured through the threat of proceedings for contempt of court.

At common law, a claimant's rights were limited to an award of damages. Later, the court of equity developed the remedy of specific performance instead, should damages prove inadequate. Specific performance is often guaranteed through the remedy of a right of possession, giving the plaintiff the right to take possession of the property in dispute.

As with all equitable remedies, orders of specific performance are discretionary, so their availability depends on their appropriateness in the circumstances. Such orders are granted when damages are not an adequate remedy and in some specific cases such as land (which is regarded as unique).

== When damages are not an adequate remedy ==
There are a variety of reasons why courts do not grant specific performance as a remedy. The primary one is when monetary damages are an adequate remedy, but specific performance may still be denied on other grounds even when damages are not adequate. Damages may be inadequate for a variety of reasons, including the inability to accurately assess damages.

=== Uniqueness and unavailability of a substitute ===
Specific performance is commonly sought and ordered when contracts for the sale of land (or interests in land) as each piece of land is unique and relatively hard to substitute for another.

Due to their uniqueness and non-substitutability, antiques and works of art have been the subject of specific performance, as have contracts to sell rare ships or lease particularly rare aircraft. In some specific commercial circumstances, where it would be impossible for a claimant buyer to purchase goods from any other supplier, specific performance may also be ordered, as in Sky Petroleum Ltd v VIP Petroleum Ltd.

Specific performance is generally unavailable to enforce the transfer of shares or stocks that are traded freely on public markets, but has been used to order transfers of shares that are not generally available.

== Other circumstances ==
An order of specific performance is generally not granted if any of the following is true:

- Specific performance would cause severe hardship to the defendant.
- The contract was unconscionable.
- The claimant has misbehaved (unclean hands).
- Specific performance is impossible.
- Performance consists of a personal service
- The contract is too vague to be enforced.
- The contract was terminable at will (meaning either party can renege without notice).
  - Note that consumer protection laws may disallow terms that allow a company to terminate a consumer contract at will (e.g. Unfair Terms in Consumer Contracts Regulations 1999)
- The contract required constant supervision.
- Mutuality was lacking in the initial agreement of the contract.
- The contract was made for no consideration.
- The contract at issue was void or unenforceable. The exception to this (in equity) is in relation to estoppel or part performance.
- Where an injunction to restrain an employee from working for a rival employer will be granted even though specific performance cannot be obtained. The leading case is Lumley v Wagner, which is an English decision.

Additionally, in England and Wales, under s. 50 of the Senior Courts Act 1981, the High Court has discretion to award a claimant damages in lieu of specific performance (or an injunction). Such damages will normally be assessed on the same basis as damages for breach of contract, namely to place the claimant in the position he would have been had the contract been carried out.

== Examples ==
In practice, specific performance is most often used as a remedy in transactions regarding land, such as in the sale of land where the vendor refuses to convey title. One traditional justification for this position is that land is unique and that there is not another legal remedy available to put the non-breaching party in the same position had the contract been performed. However, modern decisions in at least one common law jurisdiction (Ontario) have argued that "uniqueness" is only a proxy for the real conceptual justification of specific performance, which is that it is fundamentally an open-ended rule of justice and will be awarded wherever the plaintiff shows that the land in question, rather than damages, better serves justice between the parties in all the circumstances.

However, the limits of specific performance in other contexts are narrow. Moreover, performance based on the personal judgment or abilities of the party on which the demand is made is rarely ordered by the court. The reason behind it is that the forced party will often perform below the party's regular standard, when it is in the party's ability to do so. Monetary damages are usually given instead.

Traditionally, equity would only grant specific performance with respect to contracts involving chattels where the goods were unique in character, such as art, heirlooms, and the like. The rationale behind this was that with goods being fungible, the aggrieved party had an adequate remedy in damages for the other party's non-performance.

In the United States, Article 2 of the Uniform Commercial Code displaces the traditional rule in an attempt to adjust the law of sales of goods to the realities of the modern commercial marketplace. If the goods are identified to the contract for sale and in the possession of the seller, a court may order that the goods be delivered over to the buyer upon payment of the price. This is termed replevin. In addition, the Code allows a court to order specific performance where "the goods are unique or in other proper circumstances", leaving the question of what circumstances are proper to be developed by case law. The relief of Specific Performance is an equitable relief which is usually remedial or protective in nature. In civil law (the law of continental Europe and much of the non English speaking world), specific performance is considered to be the basic right. Money damages are a kind of "substitute specific performance." Indeed, it has been proposed that substitute specific performance better explains the common law rules of contract as well, see (Steven Smith, Contract Law, Clarenden Law ).

In English law, in principle reparation must be done in specie unless another remedy is more appropriate.

== Legal debate ==
There is an ongoing debate in the legal literature regarding the desirability of specific performance. Economists, generally, take the view that specific performance should be reserved to exceptional settings, because it is costly to administer and may deter promisors from engaging in efficient breach. Professor Steven Shavell, for example, famously argued that specific performance should only be reserved to contracts to convey property and that in all other cases, money damages would be superior. In contrast, many lawyers from other philosophical traditions take the view that specific performance should be preferred as it is closest to what was promised in the contract. There is also uncertainty arising from empirical research whether specific performance provides greater value to promisees than money damages, given the difficulties of enforcement.

== Law and economics ==
In contract theory, economists have compared specific performance to at-will contracts. Suppose that a seller and a buyer have agreed to trade a good in the future. In the case of specific performance, delivery of the good can be mandated by the court, while in the case of at-will contracting, the seller always has the right to walk away from the contract. Hart and Moore (1988) have shown that if only at-will contracts are enforceable, then the parties have insufficient incentives to make relationship-specific investments. Subsequently, several authors such as Aghion et al. (1994) have shown that the underinvestment problem (sometimes called the hold-up problem) can be solved if specific performance contracts are feasible. However, these conclusions rely on the assumption that there are no information asymmetries. Schmitz (2022) has pointed out that if the seller may gain an informational advantage over the buyer after the contract has been signed, then at-will contracts may sometimes be preferable from an economic efficiency point-of-view.

== See also ==
- Damages
- Equitable remedy
- Tort
- Clyatt v. United States, 197 U.S. 207 (1905) no specific performance on employment contracts
- Beswick v Beswick
- Tamplin v James
- Neylon v. Dickens

== Sources ==
- A Kronman, ‘Specific Performance’ (1978) 45 University of Chicago LR 351
- S Schwartz, ‘The Case for Specific Performance’ (1979) 89 Yale Law Journal 271
- I Macneil, ‘Efficient Breach of Contract: Circles in the Sky’ (1982) 68 Virginia LR 947
