= Unfair prejudice (United Kingdom) =

Unfair prejudice is a statutory form of action under United Kingdom company law which may be brought by aggrieved shareholders against their company. Unfair prejudice actions have generated an enormous body of cases, many of which are called "Re A Company", with only a six-digit number and report citation to distinguish them. They have become a substitute for the more restrictive conditions on a "derivative action", as an exception to the rule in Foss v Harbottle. Although not restricted in such a way, unfair prejudice claims are primarily brought in smaller, non-public companies.

== Law ==
Under the Companies Act 2006 the relevant provision is section 994, an identical successor to section 459 in the earlier Companies Act 1985:

s 994 Petition by company member

(1) A member of a company may apply to the court by petition for an order under this Part on the ground—

(a) that the company’s affairs are being or have been conducted in a manner that is unfairly prejudicial to the interests of members generally or of some part of its members (including at least himself), or
(b) that an actual or proposed act or omission of the company (including an act or omission on its behalf) is or would be so prejudicial.

(2) The provisions of this Part apply to a person who is not a member of a company but to whom shares in the company have been transferred or transmitted by operation of law, as they apply to a member of a company.

(3) In this section, and so far as applicable for the purposes of this section in the other provisions of this Part, "company" means—

(a) a company, within the meaning of this Act, or
(b) a company that is not such a company but is a statutory water company within the meaning of the Statutory Water Companies Act 1991 (c 58).

Four main issues arise out of the interpretation of section 994. First of all, who has a right to complain against whom? Secondly, what specifically does the "company's affairs" mean in s.994(1)(a)? Thirdly, when is something "unfair" and at the same time "prejudicial"? And lastly, when it says "the interests of members", what counts as an "interest" of a "member"? The defining feature of the s.994 action is that it is completely vague. Courts were therefore capable of interpreting the provisions gradually as they felt would be fair. After hearing a case, a court may make "such order as it thinks fit" under s.996. This wide discretion means that previous case law is not as weighty in precedent, as in other areas of law, since each case will be decided on its particular facts.

== History ==
In Re Saul D Harrison plc, Hoffmann LJ remarked,

"'Unfairly prejudicial' is deliberately imprecise language which was chosen by Parliament because its earlier attempt in s. 210 of the Companies Act 1948 to provide a similar remedy had been too restrictively construed. The earlier section had used the word 'oppressive', which the House of Lords in Scottish Co-operative Wholesale Society v. Meyer [1959] AC 324 said meant 'burdensome, harsh and wrongful'. This gave rise to some uncertainty whether ' wrongful' required actual illegality or invasion of legal rights. The Jenkins Committee on Company Law, which reported in 1962, thought that it should not. To make this clear, it recommended the use of the term 'unfairly prejudicial', which Parliament somewhat tardily adopted in s. 75 of the Companies Act 1980. This section is reproduced (with minor amendment) in the present s. 459 of the Companies Act 1985."

Hence the unfair prejudice remedy was introduced as an implicit instruction to the courts to liberalise and broaden the law to allow for more petitions by minority shareholders.

== Right to complain ==
To bring an action, one must be a member (a shareholder) of the company one complains against (this is defined by s.112 Companies Act 2006, the source of all sections hereafter, unless otherwise stated), or a number of members so long as they do not together hold a majority of votes. If they did hold a majority of votes, then they would be able to control the company and should not be relying on court to sort out their problems. Also, able to bring actions are shareholder nominees, those "transmitted" shares by operation of law (s.994(2)), those transferred shares without yet having been registered as members and the Secretary of State (s.995). Shareholders may assert that conduct was unfairly prejudicial even if it happened before they joined the company, and they may claim against a person who has already sold their shares (so the wrongdoer cannot escape).) But once a claimant shareholder has sold his own shares and is no longer a member, no claim may be brought.

Unlike cases under trust law, there is no equivalent maxim that "he who comes to equity must come with clean hands" (because it does not say it in the statute). But it will be highly relevant how honourably a claimant may have acted to whether the relief should be granted. Sometimes unfair prejudice claims reveal a tangled history of "she did that, so I did this, and then she..." where it may prove difficult to discern who was really worse.

== Court remedies ==
s.996 Powers of the court under this Part

(1) If the court is satisfied that a petition under this Part is well founded, it may make such order as it thinks fit for giving relief in respect of the matters complained of.

(2) Without prejudice to the generality of subsection (1), the court’s order may—

(a) regulate the conduct of the company’s affairs in the future;
(b) require the company—

(i) to refrain from doing or continuing an act complained of, or
(ii) to do an act that the petitioner has complained it has omitted to do;

(c) authorise civil proceedings to be brought in the name and on behalf of the company by such person or persons and on such terms as the court may direct;
(d) require the company not to make any, or any specified, alterations in its articles without the leave of the court;
(e) provide for the purchase of the shares of any members of the company by other members or by the company itself and, in the case of a purchase by the company itself, the reduction of the company’s capital accordingly.

The typical award made is for a minority shareholder's shares to be purchased at a fair value.

== Reform proposals ==
The Company Law Review decided that it would not update the unfair prejudice provisions for the Companies Act 2006. It had examined various proposals that the Law Commission had made, but was unenthusiastic. A salient feature of the action is the sheer volume of cases brought, often with long complicated histories, as shareholders dig into the dirt of the past, with which to bring evidence of "unfair prejudice". Active case management has been one solution being pursued since the Civil Procedure Rules 1998. The others included:

- imposing a time limit for bringing claims
- prohibiting advertising of unfair prejudice proceedings without court leave
- promoting 'shareholder exit' articles in constitutions, so that a remedy for a shareholder to leave a company where the relationships have soured are built into a company's own regulations
- adding a winding up remedy to those available already. This is already available under the Insolvency Act 1986, s 122(1)(g) where it is found "just and equitable" to do so. Confusingly, cases have not granted unfair prejudice relief but have allowed winding up on this basis, so it became a habit for claims to ask for both, either/or. This was ended by the Practice Direction [1999] BCC 741, para 9 demanding petitioners to seek winding up only where it is genuinely considered appropriate and to consent to a standard form interim order to allow the company to continue to trade
- most importantly, since the majority of resulting orders are 'buy outs', putting such a remedy on a statutory footing, where a private company member has at least 10% of the shares, and has been excluded from management. There would be a presumption that exclusion from management would be unfairly prejudicial.

The Company Law Review explicitly rejected the last two ideas.

== Cases ==
Several cases have held that the controllers of a company may not use corporate assets to fight their side.

In Atlasview Ltd v Brightview Ltd [2004] EWHC 1056 (Ch), the court rejected the view that a claim involving reflective loss was a bar.

Company affairs

- Scottish Co-operative Wholesale Society Ltd. v. Meyer [1959] AC 324, per Lord Denning
- Re City Branch Group Ltd [2005] 1 WLR 3505
- Hawkes v Cuddy and others, [2007].

Unfairly prejudicial

- Mutual Life Insurance Co. of New York v. The Rank Organisation Ltd. [1985] BCLC 11, per Goulding J
- Re Elgindata Ltd [1991] BCLC 959, per Warner J
- Re Macro (Ipswich) Ltd [1994] 2 BCLC 354, per Arden J
- Re Saul D Harrison & Sons plc [1995] 1 BCLC 14, per Hoffmann LJ
- Rock Nominees Ltd v. RCO (Holdings) plc [2004] 1 BCLC 439, per Peter-Smith J

Interests of members

- Re Blue Arrow plc [1987] BCLC 585, per Vinelott J
- O'Neill v. Phillips [1999] 1 WLR 1092, per Lord Hoffmann
- Gamlestaden Fastigheter AB v. Baltic Partners Ltd [2007] UKPC 26

Arbitration

- In Fulham Football Club (1987) Ltd v Richards [2011] EWCA Civ 855, an unfair prejudice petition was stayed under the Arbitration Act 1996 s 9, given that the dispute was covered by an arbitration agreement.

== See also ==
- UK company law
- Derivative claim
- Foss v Harbottle (1843) 2 Hare 461, 67 ER 189
- Boughtwood v Oak Investment Partnership XII, Ltd Partnership [2010] EWCA Civ 23
- US corporate law
- New York Business Corporation Law section 1104-a, the holders of 20 per cent of voting shares of a non-public corporation may request that the corporation be wound up on grounds of oppression.
- Donahue v. Rodd Electrotype Co of New England 367 Mass 578 (1975) majority shareholders cannot authorise a share purchase from one shareholder when the same opportunity is not offered to the minority.
- In re Judicial Dissolution of Kemp & Beatley, Inc 64 NY 2d 63 (1984) under a "just and equitable winding up" provision, (equivalent to IA 1986 s 212(1)(g), it was construed that less drastic remedies were available to the court before winding up, and "oppression" was said to mean ‘conduct that substantially defeats the ‘reasonable expectations’ held by minority shareholders in committing their capital to the particular enterprise. A shareholder who reasonably expected that ownership in the corporation would entitle him or her to a job, a share of corporate earnings, a place in corporate management, or some other form of security, would oppressed in a very real sense when others in the corporation seek to defeat those expectations and there exists no effective means of salvaging the investment.’
- Meiselman v. Meiselman 309 NC 279 (1983) a shareholder's ‘reasonable expectations’ are to be determined by looking at the whole history of the participants’ relationship. ‘That history will include the ‘reasonable expectations’ created at the inception of the participants’ relationship; those ‘reasonable expectations’ as altered over time; and the ‘reasonable expectations’ which develop as the participants engage in a course of dealing in conducting the affairs of the corporation.’
