= Abbas Gokal =

Pakistani businessman (born 1936)

- Born: 1936 (age 89–90); British India
- Occupation: Shipping magnate
- Organization: Gulf Group (defunct)
- Known for: BCCI Scandal
- Relatives: Mustafa Gokal; Murtaza Gokal; Abdul Hussein Gokal
- Status: Released
- Criminal charges: Financial fraud
- Penalty: 14 years

Details
- Country: United Kingdom
- Date apprehended: July 1994
- Imprisoned at: May 1997, Whitemoor Prison

Abbas Kasimali Gokal (Urdu: عباس گوکل; born in February 1936) is a British Pakistani businessman and fraudster who was chairman of the Gulf Shipping Lines. Gokal was convicted of fraud in May 1997 and sentenced to 14 years in prison. He was charged with defrauding the Bank of Credit and Commerce International (BCCI) of US$1.2 billion and was the world's biggest single fraudster at the time. His company, the Gulf Group, was the BCCI's single largest borrower.

== Early life ==
Abbas Gokal was born in February 1936, in the erstwhile British India. He was born into a Shia family. During the Partition of India, the Gokal family moved to Iraq. When the Iraqi monarchy was overthrown, the Gokal family moved to Karachi, Pakistan. Gokal had brothers; Mustafa and Murtaza Gokal.

== Gulf International Holdings ==
The three brothers: Abbas, Mustafa and Murtaza Gokal, had set up the Gulf Group (officially Gulf International Holdings) in Karachi. In 1969, they started the Gulf Shipping Lines, the flagship company of the Gulf business group. Gulf Shipping Lines was registered and headquartered in Geneva. In the beginning, the company used to transport cargo through the Arabian Sea from Karachi. Gulf Shipping Lines was well known for shipping to ports in which other companies were hesitant to ship to. A notable example was Iran. The Gulf Shipping Lines was the prime shipping company that shipped cargo to and from Iran during the decade-long Iran–Iraq War. The Gokal brothers envisioned the Gulf Shipping Lines as an international shipping empire, and the company soon expanded all over the Third World. But in the 1980s, the Gulf Shipping Lines was having financial trouble due to the international shipping crisis. In 1984, the company had reached a crisis-point when its creditors sought their money back. That is when the BCCI came to their aid. The Gokal family's relationship with BCCI founder and chairman, Hasan Abedi, dated back to the 1960s. Due to the financial backing, the Gulf Shipping Lines controlled more than 240 vessels. By the early 1980s, the Gulf Group had diversified into many different sectors. These sectors included commodities trading, retailing, hotels, mining and real-estate. Thanks to this business diversification, Gokal's personal fortune was estimated to be over £20 million, while his business group was worth billions. His credit card bills amounted to over £250,000.

== BCCI scandal ==
In 1991, the Luxembourg-based Bank of Credit and Commerce International was shut down by its regulators. It was discovered that the bank was running on loss for many years. It used to give out phoney loans, concealed deposits and hid their huge losses, which ran into billions of dollars. The bank was alleged to hide and launder the money of dictators, drug lords, and even terrorists. One of the main men behind the collapse was Abbas Gokal. The Gulf Group had an almost US$1.2 billion loan from the BCCI. He was the single largest borrower, and the loans were used to fund his own lifestyle instead of his company. The bank's auditors, Price Waterhouse, discovered that the bank had given them US$1.2 billion via 700 offshore companies. This money used to be funneled into the Gulf Group like a 'giant washing machine'. When the bank collapsed, the Gulf Group collapsed with it. As the scandal was discovered, Swiss Police raided the Gulf Group head office in Geneva. The Sheikh of Abu Dhabi (one of the main investors in the BCCI) himself lost £312 million to the Gulf Group's collapse. Gokal and his two brothers had escaped to Karachi. Bank of England officials and the Serious Fraud Office wanted Gokal on trial. However, he could not be extradited to Britain as it had no extradition treaty with Pakistan. Gokal had agreed to travel to the United States for an interview with an attorney. He was said to have information on corrupt American officials. On 18 July 1994, he left for the United States. When his plane had stopped for refuelling at Frankfurt, German police arrested him and had him extradited to the United Kingdom.

== Trial and imprisonment ==
Gokal was tried in May 1997 and found guilty of conspiring to funnel money out of the BCCI, which later contributed to the bank's collapse. He was sentenced to fourteen years in jail and confiscation of all his assets. His two brothers, Mustafa and Murtaza, were safe in Pakistan. His sentence was the longest sentence that a British court handed out for fraud. Gokal served his sentence at the high-security Whitemoor Prison in Cambridgeshire.

== Release ==
Gokal was released from imprisonment in the UK in 2003. He served only 9 years of his 14-year sentence. He was reported to be living in West London (Ealing) as of 2003.

== Personal life ==
Abbas Gokal is married to Rukaiya Gokal. They both have a daughter, Sukaiyna. Sukaiyna works in the ship management sector of Univan Ship Management. Gokal was noted to be a family-oriented man. The judge that sentenced him even noted and appreciated the fact that Gokal always put his family above everything. Gokal's affluence extended to having a house on New York's Fifth Avenue, multiple houses in London and Connecticut, private jets and Rolls-Royces. One of his brothers, Mustafa Gokal, served as the financial advisor to President Zia-ul-Haq and Supreme Leader Ayatollah Khomeini.

Coming from a Shia Muslim background, the Gokal's are Khoja Ithna'Asheri. Abbas Gokal's uncle, Shaheed Abdul Hussein Gokal, was martyred in Iraq. He was a greatly respected philanthropist and religious activist, and his loss was mourned by many across Iraq and the subcontinent. The family was forced to leave Iraq. The Gokal's were amongst the first Muslim families in the Indian subcontinent to rally behind Ayatollah Khomeini's banner, after the Islamic Revolution.

== See also ==
- Agha Hasan Abedi
- Bank of Credit and Commerce International
- Sandstorm report

== Sources ==
- Behind the Collapse of a Behemoth
- BCCI Scandal Long Legal Wranglings
- BCCI's Best Customer is also its Worst Customer
- Sequel to Biggest Banking Fraud in History – Band of Credit and Commerce International
- On the Trail of Gokal
