= Swaleh Naqvi =

British Pakistani white-collar criminal

- Born: Sayaid Mohammed Swaleh Naqvi; 1933; Agra, British India
- Died: 7 September 2019 (aged 85–86); Karachi, Pakistan
- Occupation: Banker
- Criminal penalty: 8 years
- Children: 5

Sayaid Mohammed Swaleh Naqvi (1933 – 7 September 2019) was a Pakistani-born British-Swiss banker who was the chief executive officer of Bank of Credit and Commerce International. He was convicted in the BCCI banking fraud and served jail time for eight years.

== Early life and education ==
Swaleh Naqvi was born in 1933 in Agra, British India. He migrated to Pakistan with his family in 1947, settling in Karachi. He earned a BA in English and economics, followed by an MA in Persian from Government College.

== Career ==
Naqvi began his career at Habib Bank Limited, then moved to Muslim Commercial Bank, working in East Pakistan. In 1959, he joined United Bank Limited, eventually leading its East Pakistan division.

In 1972, Naqvi left United Bank Limited to assist Agha Hasan Abedi in establishing Bank of Credit and Commerce International (BCCI). The bank expanded internationally, operating approximately 400 branches across 72 countries. It was among the earliest foreign banks permitted to operate in China, where it opened a banking training facility in Shenzhen. In 1978, he was appointed as the secretary of BCCI.

After Abedi suffered a severe heart attack and became incapacitated in 1988, Naqvi was appointed chief executive officer (CEO) of BCCI, upon recommendation from the bank's major shareholder, Sheikh Zayed bin Sultan Al Nahyan.

In October 1994, Naqvi was jailed for eight years in the BCCI banking fraud and was fined $255.4 million by a U.S. federal court.

== Death ==
Naqvi died on 7 September 2019, in Karachi after a brief illness.
