= Alfred Hartmann =

Alfred Hartmann may refer to:

- Alfred Hartmann (footballer), Swiss footballer for FC Basel from 1953 to 1955
- Alfred Hartmann (banker) (1923–2010), Swiss jurist, banker and business executive
