= Healthcare Real Estate Capital =

Healthcare Real Estate Capital, LLC
- Founder: E. Hunter Beebe
- Headquarters: Palm Beach, Florida, United States
- Number of locations: 4
- Area served: United States
- Services: Advisory Services for Healthcare Real Estate
- Website: www.hrecap.com

Healthcare Real Estate Capital, LLC ("HRE Capital") is an American firm providing consultative and transaction oriented services to owners and operators of healthcare real estate. The company's client base includes healthcare providers (hospitals, health systems, physician practices, etc.) and investor / developers. HRE Capital's services include monetization / dispositions, debt and equity raise, joint venture structuring and developer selection for both standalone and multi-asset portfolios. The company has executed over $11 billion of transactions throughout the United States.

== History ==
HRE Capital was founded in 2007 by E. Hunter Beebe and has four offices positioned across the United States. Prior to HRE Capital, Mr. Beebe spent six years with a boutique real estate investment bank and was a founding member of its real estate practice. Mr. Beebe began his career with Ernst & Young Kenneth Leventhal's National Real Estate Capital Markets Group.

== Recent Activities ==
- American Academic Health – $165 capitalization and joint venture structuring.
- Catalyst Healthcare Real Estate – $250 million programmatic joint venture equity raise.
- Greenville Hospital System – $285 million portfolio disposition.
- AW Property Co. – $33.4 million portfolio acquisition joint venture equity and debt raise.
- FPR Medical Properties – $200 million portfolio programmatic joint venture equity raise.
- The Greenfield Group – $124 million medical office building portfolio disposition.
- Granger Group – $22 million disposition of a long-term acute care hospital (LTACH).
- Meadows & Ohly – $238 million medical office building portfolio disposition.
- Greenville Hospital System – $163 million sale / master leaseback.
- Saline Memorial Hospital – $15 million sale / partial leaseback.
- Yale-New Haven Hospital – $57 million sale / master leaseback.
