= Monzer Hourani =

Lebanese-American engineer and inventor

- منذر الحوراني
- Born: 22 June 1943 (age 83); Palestine
- Education: University of Texas at Austin
- Occupations: Engineer, inventor, founder and CEO of Medistar
- Years active: 1969–present
- Known for: Inventing Integrated Viral Protection's Biodefense Indoor Air Protection System

Monzer Hourani (Arabic: منذر الحوراني; born 22 June 1943) is a Lebanese-American engineer and inventor. He is the founder and president of Medistar, a company specializing in healthcare real estate development. Hourani was born and educated in Lebanon, where he had a traumatic childhood. He moved to the US in 1965 where he obtained bachelor degrees in architecture and architectural engineering from the University of Texas at Austin.

Hourani founded an engineering firm which he sold in the early 1980s to support his family in Lebanon during the 1982 Lebanese civil war. In 1983, he founded the Medistar corporation. Hourani is known for the invention of the Integrated Viral Protection (IVP) Biodefense Indoor Air Protection System launched in August 2020, a HEPA air scrubber that traps and neutralizes airborne pathogens.

== Early years and education ==
Hourani was born on 22 June 1943 to Adib and Adiba Hourani; he was the eldest of four siblings. The Houranis were a well-to-do family originating from Marjayoun in South Lebanon; they owned land across the border from Lebanon in then-northern Palestine. Monzer was born in Palestine, but his exact birthplace is unknown due to the destruction of his birth records in a church fire.

When Monzer was five, his family left their holdings in Palestine and fled to Tripoli in Northern Lebanon to escape the 1948 Arab–Israeli War. Hourani grew up in Tripoli, where his father taught English and history in college. Hourani showed a talent for music when he was six, and at eight he started taking piano lessons. Ten years after moving back to Lebanon, the country witnessed a rise in political and religious tension, culminating in the 1958 Lebanon crisis. The war involved a US military intervention in support of then-Lebanese president Camille Chamoun. The young Hourani would spend hours at the US Information Services Library, where, on 8 May 1958, the library was attacked by a mob of insurgents. Hourani hid under a library table, but he witnessed the murder of the librarian by stabbing. The traumatized Hourani ran home and would not stop screaming for two days. On 21 June 1958, Hourani's mother was shot in front of him when the two were out in an unstable Tripoli neighborhood.

After completing his secondary education in Lebanon in 1965, Hourani was offered a scholarship to a Russian university to complete his studies in physics, he turned down the opportunity and traveled to the US to study at the University of Texas at Austin. In 1969, he obtained bachelor degrees in architecture and architectural engineering.

== Career ==
Hourani worked for a short while in Detroit's Giffels & Rosetti; he returned to Lebanon for a while and moved back to the US in 1971 where he was employed with an architect in Phoenix. In 1972, he founded Lenert Hourani & Associates Structural Engineering with structural engineer Don Lenert. In 1975, the business was renamed M. Hourani & Associates after Lenert retired.

In the 1980s Hourani obtained financing from Lebanese and European investors to fund large-scale real estate projects in Houston. Soon afterwards, the Early 1980s recession hit and many developers went bankrupt. Hourani could not complete his building projects because he could not obtain loans from the distressed banks; his foreign investors bailed out and asked to be compensated. He was able to pay the investors back by focusing on other projects. In 1983 he established Medistar, a healthcare real estate development company. In 1989 the U.S. Congress established the Resolution Trust Corporation, an asset management company charged with liquidating assets, primarily real estate-related assets such as mortgage loans, that had been assets of savings and loan associations (S&Ls) declared insolvent by the Office of Thrift Supervision (OTS) as a consequence of the savings and loan crisis of the 1980s. According to Hourani, the RTC refused the remaining loan funds and wanted him to immediately pay off his loans on the uncompleted projects. He asked the RTC to continue funding his loans; he offered his "personal real estate and investment lands as additional collateral to the RTC". The RTC took and sold Hourani's land at low prices leaving him with debt. Afterwards, Hourani was sued for over a $250 million and his lawyers recommended that he files for bankruptcy; he refused and paid off his debt to the banks and to his investors.

In the 1990s, Hourani's healthcare real estate development business resumed successfully; one of his major clients was Healthsouth. Hourani's firms again faced adversity when Healtsouth was almost dissolved when main management figures were arrested and charged with bribery and fraud. Medistar picked up with other clients.

=== Inventions ===
In the 1970s, Hourani pioneered the use of prestressed concrete for the enforcement of slabs on grade and retaining walls. In 2002 Hourani patented window braces designed to resist Category 4 and 5 hurricanes; he also conceived proprietary technology for an oil skimmer inspired by the 1989 Exxon Valdez oil spill disaster in Alaska, and the 2010 Deepwater Horizon oil spill in the Gulf of Mexico.

Hourani came up with the idea of a HEPA air scrubber that neutralizes SARS-CoV-2 in March 2020. His company Medistar and researchers at the University of Houston and Texas A&M University cooperated to create the Integrated Viral Protection (IVP) Biodefense Indoor Air Protection System, which was launched in August 2020. The filter is sold through Medistar subsidiary Integrated Viral Protection; it is a mobile HEPA air scrubber equipped with layers of hyper-heated nickel foam mesh that trap and neutralize airborne pathogens, including viruses, without affecting ambient temperature. The proprietary nickel foam air filter at the core of the device was designed by Zhifeng Ren, the director of the Texas Center of Superconductivity at the University of Houston. The IVP scrubber almost completely eliminates SARS-CoV-2 from the ambient air.IVP rolled out in 2021 in a number of Texas schools, medical and nursing care establishments, and hotels among other facilities. The IVP scrubber was peer reviewed by the MIT and the Argonne National Laboratory, and it underwent regulatory procedures by the FDA, the EPA, and the CDC, which define IVP as a Type 2 medical device.

== Awards and recognition ==
On April 8, 2021, Engineering News Record (ENR) bestowed Hourani with the 2021 ENR Award of Excellence for his innovative work on the IVP Biodefense Indoor Air Protection System and for contributing to the prevention and control of COVID-19 efforts. IVP's Biodefense Indoor Air Protection System was recognized as a top innovation of 2020 for fighting COVID-19 by the American Society of Mechanical Engineers (AMSE).

== Campaign finance fraud accusations ==
Hourani converted to the Church of Jesus Christ of Latter-day Saints (LDS Church) in the 1980s. Hourani developed close ties and was involved in a number of controversies with US senator Orrin Hatch who was his mentor when he joined the LDS Church.

Senator Hatch was approached by the leaders of the Bank of Credit and Commerce International (BCCI) which was accused of laundering drug money. Since 1989, Hatch had been involved in efforts to counter the negative publicity that surrounded the bank. In 1990 Hatch presented a defense of the bank in a speech on the Senate floor. After the speech, Hatch solicited the bank to approve a $10 million loan to Hourani. In 1991, BCCI was shut down after regulators accused it of one of the biggest international financial frauds in history.

Hatch was accused of receiving campaign contributions from Hourani laundered through his employees after Hourani had exceeded the maximum individual contributions limit. Hourani purchased 1,200 CDs of Hatch's songs, for which Hatch received $3 to $7 each, he also managed a blind trust for Hatch. These led to a Senate Ethics Committee investigation, by which Hatch was eventually cleared; Hourani however, who claimed that he didn't know that he violated the law, was fined $10,000.
