= Serious Fraud Office (United Kingdom) =

Department of Government of United Kingdom that investigates and prosecutes complex fraud

Agency overview
- Formed: 1987; 39 years ago
- Employees: 607 FTE (2023/24)
- Annual budget: £95.5 million (2023/24)

Jurisdictional structure
- Legal jurisdiction: England and Wales; Northern Ireland

Operational structure
- Headquarters: Cockspur Street, London
- Elected officer responsible: Ellie Reeves, Attorney General for England and Wales
- Agency executive: Nick Ephgrave, director

Website
- www.sfo.gov.uk

The Serious Fraud Office (SFO) is a non-ministerial government department of the Government of the United Kingdom that investigates and prosecutes serious or complex fraud and corruption in England, Wales and Northern Ireland. The SFO is accountable to the Attorney General for England and Wales, and was established by the Criminal Justice Act 1987, an Act of the Parliament of the United Kingdom.

Section 2 of the Criminal Justice Act 1987 grants the SFO powers to require any person (or business/bank) to provide any relevant documents (including confidential ones) and answer any relevant questions including ones about confidential matters. The SFO is the principal enforcer of the Bribery Act 2010, which has been designed to encourage good corporate governance and enhance the reputation of the City of London and the UK as a safe place to do business. Its jurisdiction does not extend to Scotland, where fraud and corruption are investigated by Police Scotland through their Specialist Crime Division, and prosecutions are undertaken by the Economic Crime Unit of the Crown Office and Procurator Fiscal Service.

== History ==
=== Formation of the unit ===
During the 1970s and early 1980s a series of financial scandals in the City of London destroyed the public's trust in the way serious or complex frauds were handled. In response to this the Government established the Fraud Trials Committee in 1983. This independent committee, under the chairmanship of Lord Roskill, considered how changes to the law and criminal proceedings could lead to more effective ways of fighting fraud. The committee report, commonly known as the Roskill Report was published in 1986. Its main recommendation was to set up a new, unified organisation responsible for detecting, investigating and prosecuting serious fraud cases. As a result, the Serious Fraud Office (SFO) and its unique powers were created by the Criminal Justice Act 1987, "an Act to make further provision for the investigation of and trials for fraud; and for connected purposes". It opened for business in April 1988. The SFO also enforces the Bribery Act 2010.

=== List of directors ===
- John Wood (1988–1990)
- Dame Barbara Mills (1990–1992)
- George Staple (1992–1997)
- Rosalind Wright (1997–2003)
- Robert Wardle (2003–2008)
- Richard Alderman (2008–2012)
- Sir David Green (2012–2018)
- Lisa Osofsky (2018–2023)
- Nick Ephgrave (2023–2026)
- Graham McNulty QPM (2026-present)

=== Al-Yamamah investigation ===
The Al-Yamamah arms deal during the 1980s was a large scale aircraft and weapons deal between the UK and Saudi Arabia. It was extended throughout the 1990s and saw thousands of British citizens living and working in Saudi Arabia representing £40 billion worth of business. BAE Systems Plc was the primary contractor. In 2004 the SFO began to investigate the contracts within the al-Yamamah deal on the grounds of suspected false accounting, but the investigation was controversially dropped in 2006. The decision was made following concerns about national security amidst reports that the Saudi Government would stop sharing counterterrorist information with the UK if the investigation continued. This drew criticism from number of sources, not least from the Organisation for Economic Cooperation and Development (OECD). A High Court review in 2008 ruled that the SFO had acted unlawfully by dropping the corruption investigation but this was later overturned on appeal by the SFO to the House of Lords.

=== Comparison to New York ===
In 2008, an official internal "Review of the Serious Fraud Office", which was conducted by a former senior New York City prosecutor, compared the SFO unfavourably with two of its counterparts in New York City: the offices of the United States Attorney for the Southern District of New York and the New York County District Attorney. It found that the American prosecutors obtained higher conviction rates in a shorter amount of time with fewer resources. It also found that the SFO had significantly lower conviction rates than elite divisions of the British Crown Prosecution Service. It attributed the SFO's relatively poor performance to, among other things, failure to keep all court advocacy "in-house", failure to assign each case a single lawyer who managed it "from cradle to grave", failure to interview witnesses at an early stage, and failure to co-operate closely with the police.

=== 2010s ===
While Home Secretary, Theresa May expressed that she wanted the National Crime Agency (NCA) to absorb the SFO. While the SFO is supervised by the Attorney General's Office, the NCA is overseen by the Home Office. From around 2005 to 2017, the SFO underwent a series of budget cuts.

On 18 May 2017, the Tories released a manifesto pledging to dismantle the Serious Fraud Office and roll it into the NCA if they won the general elections in June 2017. The manifesto claimed that the incorporation would "strengthen Britain's response to white collar crime by... improving intelligence sharing and bolstering the investigation of serious fraud, money laundering and financial crime."

== Notable cases ==
=== Guinness share-trading fraud ===
In 1986 there were rumours that the Guinness Brewery takeover of the Distillers Company was tainted by an unlawful share support operation which involved Guinness offering secret indemnities (from its own funds) against losses to people 'supporting' the bid which resulted in a dramatic rise in the price of Guinness shares.

Having examined the bid, the SFO opened an investigation which led to the conviction in 1990 of the then chief executive of Guinness and three other defendants.

=== BAE Systems weapons sales to Saudi Arabia ===
Al Yamamah is the name of a series of a record arms sales by the United Kingdom to Saudi Arabia. In 2006, an investigation by the British Serious Fraud Office into the deal was discontinued after political pressure from the Saudi and British governments.

=== BAE Systems radar sale to Tanzania ===
In 1999 British Aerospace Defence Systems Ltd agreed a contract with the Government of Tanzania for the supply of a radar defence system. A local businessman in Tanzania was recruited to advise BAE on its negotiations with the Government on the radar contract.

Between January 2000 and December 2005 around $12.4 million was paid to the local businessman's two companies. BAE has accepted that there was a high probability that part of this sum would be used to favour it in the contract negotiations with the Tanzanian Government.

The payments were not subject to proper and adequate scrutiny or review and BAE Systems Plc was subsequently fined £500,000 after admitting that it had failed to keep adequate accounting records of the defence contract with the Government of Tanzania. This outcome followed a settlement by BAE, as part of a global agreement reached in 2010 with the Serious Fraud Office and the US Department of Justice, concerning contracts in a number of countries. The settlement with the SFO relates to the Tanzanian contract. The terms of the settlement include an agreement by BAE to pay an ex-gratia sum (£30 million less any fine imposed by the Crown Court) for the benefit of the people of Tanzania. BAE was also ordered to pay £225,000 costs to the SFO.

=== Barclays emergency fundraising ===
In June 2017, John Varley, Roger Jenkins, Tom Kalaris and Richard Boath were charged with offences regarding Barclays's raising of £11.8 billion in emergency funds. The fraud was alleged to have taken place around the 2008 financial crisis.

=== Abbas Gokal & the BCCI ===
The BCCI Bank was a Luxembourg-registered bank that collapsed in 1992. It was discovered by the bank's auditors, that the bank was running on loss for many years. It was reported that the bank was involved in drug-trafficking, money-laundering and phony loans. The key player in the collapse was Pakistani shipping magnate Abbas Gokal. It was discovered that Gokal's company, Gulf Shipping Lines, had received a US$1.2 billion unsecured loan from the bank. When the bank collapsed and the scandal emerged, Gokal escaped to Pakistan, but since the United Kingdom and Pakistan had no extradition treaty, he could not be extradited to the UK to stand trial.

However, when Gokal was making a trip to America in 1994, his plane stopped for re-fueling in Frankfurt. There, German police arrested him and extradited him to the United Kingdom. He was handed a 14-year sentence as a result of the SFO prosecution, the longest sentence handed out in a British court for fraud.

=== Mykola Zlochevsky ===
In April 2014, the SFO launched a money laundering investigation against Ukrainian oligarch Mykola Zlochevsky. Accounts of Burisma Holdings and its parent Brociti Investments, controlled by Zlochevsky, were frozen at the London branch of BNP Paribas. That money US$23 million was transferred as a result of complex transactions by a company controlled by a Ukrainian businessman Serhiy Kurchenko, a subject of the European Union restrictive measures. When the Ukrainian prosecutor general's office failed to provide documents needed for the investigation, a British court in January 2015 dropped the case and ordered the assets be unfrozen.

== Organisation ==
As one of the Law Officers' Departments, the SFO reports to the Attorney General for England and Wales. The SFO is unique in that its role is to both investigate and prosecute. Its case teams are therefore made up of investigators, lawyers, law clerks and forensic accountants. The SFO employs around 500 people. The cost of running the SFO in the financial year 2010–11 was 64p for each member of the British public. Over 80 per cent of staff are specialist caseworkers. When deciding what action to take, lawyers in the SFO must bear in mind the Prosecutors Code.

The SFO is not a police force and its own investigators are not constables. Although the SFO does have certain investigatory powers, it does not have the powers of arrest or police powers in relation to search. Therefore, if these powers are necessary for an investigation the SFO will request support from the police or NCA as necessary.

== Activities and responsibilities ==
The SFO is a specialist organisation that investigates only the most serious types of economic crime. As a result, a potential case must meet certain criteria before it is taken on. In deciding, the Director will take into account all the circumstances of the case and consider:

- cases which undermine British commercial/financial PLC in general and the City of London in particular;
- cases where the actual or potential loss involved are high;
- cases where actual or potential harm is significant;
- cases where there is a very significant public interest element; and
- new species of fraud

The Serious Fraud Office's jurisdiction does not extend to Scotland where fraud and corruption are investigated by Police Scotland through their Specialist Crime Division, and prosecutions are undertaken by the Economic Crime Unit of the Crown Office and Procurator Fiscal Service.

=== Fraud ===
The SFO investigates and prosecutes fraud. The SFO prosecutes different types of fraud, including investment fraud. Among the types of investment fraud prosecuted are boiler room fraud (share scams), which is an operation, usually run from abroad, where scammers typically cold-call people and use hard-sell tactics to sell shares that prove worthless, are inflated in price, or don't exist. The SFO cites Vintage Wines of St Albans as an example of a successful boiler room fraud prosecution. The SFO also prosecutes the investment schemes called 'Ponzi' or pyramid schemes, which typically involves an investment offer which promises to provide an abnormally higher rate of return. In a Ponzi scheme, a single operator benefits, while in a pyramid scheme, many investors benefit from recruiting other investors. The SFO has cited the KF Concept case as an example of one of its successful ponzi scheme prosecutions, where a banker was jailed for 10 years for running an unauthorized investment business and defrauding investors of amounts over £17 million. The Serious Fraud Office (SFO) in the UK has received an additional £9.3 million from the government to enhance its capabilities in addressing complex fraud and corruption. This funding aims to improve the agency's resources and operational efficiency, particularly in light of concerns regarding its effectiveness in handling high-profile cases that have resulted in failed prosecutions. Critics have raised issues about delays and inefficiencies in the SFO's investigations, which can impede successful outcomes. The increase in funding is intended to help the SFO respond more effectively to serious Financial crimes. There are ongoing discussions about the need for more substantial long-term support to ensure that the SFO can adequately fulfill its mandate and tackle the rising threats posed by financial crime and corruption in the UK.

The SFO also prosecutes multiple types of corporate fraud. The SFO website as of 2013 outlined several types of fraud it classified as corporate, including asset stripping, which involved company directors taking company funds or assets of value while leaving behind the debts. Other types of prosecuted corporate fraud include fraudulent trading, where a company carries on a business for any fraudulent purposes. An example of a successful SFO prosecution for fraudulent trading is the InterGB group, the collective name for a number of companies that, between 1996 and 2000, extracted more than £85 million from three financial institutions by submitting false invoices. The chairman of the group was jailed for seven years. Also prosecuted is 'share ramping', also known as 'pump and dump' or 'book ramping', is where criminals influence the share price of a company and then take advantage of the price fluctuations. Publishing false information is also prosecuted as corporate crime. According to the SFO, this is usually done to mislead investors and creditors and to keep a failing company trading.

=== Bribery and corruption ===
According to the SFO, corruption is where the integrity of a person, Government, or company is manipulated and compromised for personal gain. SFO classifies and prosecutes two main types of corruption. It defines political corruption as the dysfunction of a political system or institution in which government officials, political officials or employees look for illegitimate personal gain through actions such as bribery, extortion, cronyism, patronage and embezzlement. It defines corporate corruption as where, for example, bribes are offered to agencies, institutions or individuals in order to win a contract. It brought up Innospec Limited, manufacturers of a fuel additive, as an example of a successful prosecution for corporate corruption.

=== Self-reporting ===
The SFO encourages self-reporting of fraud. Azizur Rahman, senior partner at law firm Rahman Ravelli has provided further guidance on internal investigations of alleged bribery and the potential leniency benefits of self-reporting, although he notes that the SFO will still investigate: they will not simply take a company's self-report "at face value".

=== Overseas assistance ===
The SFO has a dedicated International Assistance team which regularly assists law enforcement agencies worldwide with their investigations. In 2010–11 the SFO assisted over 30 different jurisdictions.

=== Victim support ===
According to the SFO, victims are at the core of its strategy. They include any person, organisation, or Government both in the UK and abroad, which has suffered direct financial loss from the most serious and complex fraud, or corruption.

The SFO tries to get justice for victims by recovering as much recompense as possible for victims. In April 2011, £64 million of funds were, or were due to be returned to victims. The average jail sentence handed out in SFO cases was 56 months in 2010-11. For example, in 2011 three fraudsters running the online Xclusive ticket fraud (that failed to deliver tickets to the Beijing Olympics and various music festivals) each received prison sentences of up to eight years. The SFO started confiscation proceedings to recover money for victims.

== Recent Investigations ==
The SFO launched an investigation into the collapsed law firm Axiom Ince in 2023. This case involved allegations of £66 million in missing client money and resulted in significant action by the SFO. In January 2023, the agency conducted searches at three premises across England, leading to three arrests. The SFO continues to actively pursue assets from convicted fraudsters. In October 2024, the agency successfully recovered £295,000 from Virendra Rastogi's hidden pension funds. This recovery was part of an ongoing proceeds of crime investigation that has yielded nearly £6 million to date, including the sale of Rastogi's Marylebone home and seizure of valuable assets. In November 2024, the SFO received an additional £9.3 million in funding from the government. This investment aims to strengthen the agency's capacity to recover criminal assets, expand its use of technology for disclosure purposes, and improve its case management system. The SFO's work frequently involves cross-border investigations, highlighting the international nature of many financial crimes. The agency maintains cooperation with international partners, as evidenced by its collaboration with the Australian Federal Police in the Rio Tinto case.

In December 2024, five former members of national firm Axiom Ince have been charged by the Serious Fraud Office with offences including fraud, forgery and the destruction of documents relating to the collapse of the firm and the alleged misuse of client money.

== Ongoing Challenges ==
Despite these developments, the SFO continues to face challenges in handling high-profile cases. The agency has experienced setbacks, including the collapse of some prosecutions, which has led to scrutiny of its effectiveness in complex financial crime cases. These recent activities and developments demonstrate the SFO's continued efforts to adapt and strengthen its capabilities in the fight against serious fraud and financial crime.

== Criticism ==
The SFO, which reports to the Attorney General's Office, has over time repeatedly faced attempts by politicians to roll it into a broader crime-fighting body. In December 2021 the Court of Appeal criticised the SFO with regards to their handling of the Unaoil case for ‘wholly inappropriate’ contacts with a ‘fixer’, for which the agency had already been criticised, as well as "serious" disclosure failures undermining a defendant's right to a fair trial. Three court of appeal judges overturned the conviction of a businessman because of the watchdog's misconduct. In July 2020, His Honour Judge Beddoe had rebuked SFO director Lisa Osofsky over "flattering" texts from a US-based private investigator who was seeking to secure more favourable sentences for his clients. The judge criticised Osofsky for making herself "vulnerable to "flattery" following inappropriate contact with private investigator David Tinsley and said the SFO's contact with him should be "comprehensively reviewed to see what lessons can be learned from it".

The decision came months after the trial of two Serco executives charged with fraud collapsed because of SFO disclosure errors. In a written statement after his acquittal, Mr Marshall said. "It is clear to me that I was prosecuted, not as a result of a fair assessment of the evidence, but because I was collateral damage in the deal that was done by Serco with the SFO." Judge said the SFO took the view that issues identified had "undermined the process of disclosure in this case to the extent that the trial cannot safely and fairly proceed".

The cases raised serious questions about the SFO's approach. The Justice Committee launched a new inquiry to investigate the criminal justice system's approach to combatting fraud. The Committee examined the approach of the Serious Fraud Office to combatting economic crime and responding to the challenges of Brexit and the pandemic. It also examined what lessons have been learnt from recent high-profile cases, as well as addressing concerns over evidence disclosure, staff culture and victim support (in March and October 2022).

The office of the attorney general issued a statement saying Suella Braverman was "deeply concerned about the findings in the judgment". The attorney general then launched a "forensic and robust" probe in to the failings at the Britain's main anti-corruption agency. The Attorney General, Suella Braverman stated: "I announced this review on the day of the judgment as it was clear to me that swift action was needed. We must ensure lessons are learned so that the failings we saw in the Unaoil case can never happen again."

In February 2022, the SFO became subject to an inquiry by the UK Public Accounts Committee, which monitors state spending, as the collapse of the so-called "Serco case" caused serious financial harm to the SFO budget. SFO director Lisa Osofsky appeared before the committee to explain a £2.55m overspend in 2020/21, which was the result of the failed prosecution of two former directors of Serco.

This led to public debate about possible future of SFO and its leadership. In June 2022 it was announced that the "forensic and robust review" commissioned by the Attorney General which was conducted by Sir David Calvert-Smith was delayed. On 21 July 2022 the review was published. Osofsky commented on the report as a: "sobering read". The review was criticizing the conduct of SFO head: "It is clear that Osofsky was faced with a difficult situation very early in her tenure and made a number of mistakes and misjudgments which, with the benefit of hindsight, she now accepts." Calvert-Smith said further that Osofsky "was not supposed to be personally involved in contact" with a fixer, who had no recognised legal role in the so-called Unaoil case.

Calvert-Smith's review paints a picture of chaotic management of the Unaoil case and a "toxic" relationship between staff and senior management within the SFO. A "damaging culture of distrust" between the case team and senior managers developed, the review said. The review found some failings in the case involved "cultural issues within the SFO", such as noncompliant record keeping, "failure to comply with its disclosure obligations", "inadequate resourcing of the case", "DSFO using her personal mobile phone and failing to take contemporaneous notes of meetings and conversations" and a "lack of understanding of priorities between the case team and senior management", amplified by the impression that a U.S. fixer had the "seal of approval" from the director and, caused in part by the suspension and unfair and wrongful dismissal of the Unaoil case controller, Tom Martin was suspended in July 2018. In February 2021, the judge concluded that Tom Martin's complaints of unfair dismissal and breach of contract were "well founded". In July 2022, SFO lost its appeal over unfair sacking of Martin.

Emily Thornberry MP, Labour's Shadow Attorney General, stated on the report that it "lays bare a catalogue of woeful mismanagement and inexplicable misjudgements at the top of the SFO". In direct reference to Osofsky Thornberry said the SFO's leadership had shown "gullibility and arrogance" in their dealings with a "fixer", she tweeted on 21 July. She stated further "It is vital that the Attorney General not only commits to implement Sir David's recommendations in full, but asks herself whether the senior managers at the SFO whose failures are exposed in this report are really the individuals best placed to repair the damage. Earlier this year Thornberry tweeted: "The Unaoil debacle is not a one-off."

Brian Altman KC was commissioned by the SFO to review the Serco case. He noted there had been "systemic problems of real concern" in relation to the SFO's disclosure in that case, including that the appointed officer's "inexperience should have disqualified him from appointment as disclosure officer on such a large and complex case". The Serious Fraud Office has not referred any lawyers to the Solicitors Regulation Authority over the collapse of a high-profile criminal trial, MPs heard in February 2022. The SFO must prevent third parties having "direct access" to the watchdog's director and ensure all prosecutions have an "effective disclosure strategy", Calvert-Smith's review into the calamitous Unaoil bribery case recommended – as a third man jailed after the investigation had his name cleared. These stinging defeats for the SFO have "left the entire Unaoil case on shaky ground".

According to the Spotlight on corruption, Serco and Unaoil "botched disclosures raise concerns about whether there are more systemic problems in the SFO’s strategy and conduct of high-stakes cases." The blame for three quashed convictions in the Unaoil bribery case and the midtrial collapse of another case against two Serco executives is both institutional and individual. Both cases were sunk by the SFO's failure to properly disclose evidence to the defense. The reports found the SFO struggled to keep adequate records, failed to properly oversee case progression and failed to carry out disclosure checks, and that its key staff were too inexperienced to handle the process. Both Brian Altman's KC review into the collapse of the R v Woods and Marshall trial and Sir David Calvert-Smith's review into the SFO's handling of the Unaoil investigation exposed the scale of the agency's problems and challenges. Susan Hawley, executive director at anti-corruption charity Spotlight on Corruption, said: "Both the Calvert-Smith and the Altman reviews point to similar and very serious underlying issues behind the SFO’s spate of collapsed trials."

The UK's Serious Fraud Office spent £16.2 million on its corruption investigation into the oil consultancy Unaoil, with nearly a third allocated to external legal fees. The investigation faced significant challenges, including the quashing of three bribery convictions due to non-disclosure of evidence and the collapse of a fourth trial.

=== Conflicts between SFO and private interests ===
In August 2022, Lisa Osofsky stated that she was proud of a "revolving door" between the regulator and private firms as fears grew that movement of senior figures into private sector would transfer inside knowledge into companies, which were subject to investigations. Among the individuals criticized for moving from senior positions in the SFO to private law firms were Sir David Green, the SFO's former director, two of its former general counsels, four former heads or co-heads of its bribery and corruption divisions, two former heads of its fraud division and the former heads of its assurance and international assistance divisions.

In November 2021, in her letter: "SFO’s revolving door works better than a closed shop" published by the Financial Times Osofsky said that they "advocate for the interchange of personnel. It has always happened and long may it continue. It grows the collective capability of our organisation more than a closed shop ever could." She noted that they already use one, "much to our advantage. In short, we advocate for the interchange of personnel," and that "our relatively modest budget doesn’t prevent us from delivering".

In March 2023, Private Eye magazine, a UK-based widely recognized news and current affairs publication edited by Ian Hislop, revealed that SFO chief Lisa Osofsky has been forced to disclose further information about her recusal from three separate investigations. Private Eye wrote that the SFO's 2021 annual report revealed that Lisa Osofsky recused herself from three investigations; Barclays bank, Harlequin properties, and a third unnamed investigation. Media noted that none of Osofsky's predecessors had ever needed to recuse themselves from live investigations. After Private Eye sent a Freedom of Information request about the nature of the recusals and advice given to Osofsky, the SFO said that it would not disclose details about what Osofsky's links were to the investigations. Media highlighted the clear conflict of interest in Osofsky's decision to reject disclosure under the FOI request, and commented that the whole affair remains "unexplained and unsatisfactory".
