= Lisa Osofsky =

American-British lawyer

- Royal coat of arms of the United Kingdom

Director of the Serious Fraud Office
- In office September 2018 – August 2023
- Minister: Geoffrey Cox; Suella Braverman; Michael Ellis; Victoria Prentis
- Preceded by: David Green
- Succeeded by: Nick Ephgrave

Personal details
- Born: 18 September 1961 (age 65)
- Spouse: Marc Wasserman
- Education: Amherst College; Harvard Law School
- Occupation: Lawyer

Lisa Marie Osofsky (born 18 September 1961) is an American-British lawyer who served as Director of the UK's Serious Fraud Office (SFO) from September 2018 until August 2023. She was succeeded by Nick Ephgrave.

== Early life ==
Osofsky has dual American and British nationality. She earned a bachelor's degree from Amherst College, and a juris doctor from Harvard Law School.

== Career ==
Osofsky worked for the FBI as deputy general counsel. She was then managing director and European head of investigations at Exiger, whom she joined in 2003.

She began her career working as a US federal prosecutor, taking on white collar crime cases including defence contractor and bank frauds, money laundering and drug related conspiracies. She spent five years as Deputy General Counsel and Ethics Officer at the FBI and was seconded to the SFO whilst a Special Attorney in the US Department of Justice’s Fraud Division. She was also called to the Bar in England and Wales.

Osofsky has worked three years for Goldman Sachs International as their Money Laundering Reporting Officer and spent seven years in the Corporate Investigation Division of Control Risks, where she advised on compliance issues.

Prior to joining the SFO, Osofsky worked for Exiger, a global governance, risk and compliance advisory firm, where she served as Regional Leader and Head of Investigations for Europe, Middle East and Africa. In this capacity she was also in charge of monitoring a Deferred Prosecution Agreement (DPA) which the HSBC’s signed with the US Department of Justice.

In June 2018, it was announced that Osofsky would succeed the SFO's interim director Mark Thompson (who was standing in since David Green left) on 3 September.

=== Severe Criticism ===
During her term she had repeatedly faced severe criticism. In particular Osofsky’s handling of numerous cases, including, KBR, Serco and the so called “Unaoil” investigation was commented by lawmakers as marked by “serious and very, very basic errors”. This led to speculation over her future. especially when the then Attorney General, Suella Braverman QC MP, launched an independent review into the SFO, commissioning a “forensic and robust” probe of Osofsky’s agency in February 2022, piling pressure on SFO director Lisa Osofsky. It was conducted by a former director of public prosecutions and a retired High Court judge Sir David Calvert-Smith Braverman first announced a planned SFO review in December 2021 after the Court of Appeal quashed the conviction of a former executive at Unaoil, criticising the SFO for disclosure failures that it said undermined his right to a fair trial.

On the day, the Attorney General pledged its “forensic and robust” review into the watchdog and its director, giving evidence to the House of Commons Public Accounts Committee on 9 February 2022 as to why the SFO was at risk of over-spending on its budget that year, Lisa Osofsky admitted, the SFO staff “are human beings. We make mistakes”. Less than 1 month later, in March 2022, the SFO’s director refused to answer questions from MPs about the quashing of a second former oil executive’s bribery conviction, saying she did not want to ‘impinge on’ a judge-led review of the watchdog’s disclosure failures.

Lisa Osofsky was finally judged to have made a “number of mistakes and misjudgments” in her handling of a prosecution which has ultimately resulted in the convictions of three businessmen being overturned. SFO head was criticized for failings that denied defendant fair trial. The report criticized and exposed “fundamental failures” at the UK’s anti-fraud agency, including Osofsky’s use of her personal mobile, lack of accountability, undocumented and unminuted meetings with a fixer. It also attested major errors as severe mishandlings of cases, disclosure failures, amplified by the impression that a U.S. fixer had the “seal of approval” from the director. and “toxic” relationship between staff and senior management. Piling fresh pressure on SFO Director Lisa Osofsky, serious problems included a failure to properly record meetings, the use of personal mobile phones, disclosure failures and distrust between senior management and the case team, amplified by the impression that a U.S. fixer had the "seal of approval" from the director. A “damaging culture of distrust between the case team and senior managers developed, the review said.

Emily Thornberry MP, Labour’s Shadow Attorney General, responding to Sir David Calvert-Smith’s report into the Serious Fraud Office’s handling of the Unaoil case, said: “It is clear that the hard-working investigative staff at the SFO were repeatedly undermined by senior managers whose combination of gullibility and arrogance allowed a fixer for the Unaoil owners to manipulate their management of the case. Susan Hawley, executive director at anti-corruption charity Spotlight on Corruption, said: ‘This is a grim day for the SFO” led by Osofsky. But only in October 2022 did Osofsky finally admit to MPs that she was taken in by an ex-US Drug Enforcement Administration agent acting as a ‘fixer’ in relation to the Unaoil bribery scandal. But this admission raises more questions than it answers. Lawmakers have periodically called for the SFO to be rolled into a broader crime-fighting force.

Lisa Osofsky was considered a refreshing change when she was appointed as the UK’s chief anti-bribery prosecutor with a five-year contract. But the government’s patience with the SFO’s mistakes has been running out through her tenure. Less than four years later, the fate of the agency and its director was on the agenda again after calamitous missteps during a string of prosecutions. As a consequence, Osofsky announced to the SFO staff on November 9 according to various media reports, that she would not be running again for leading the SFO after her current term. The attorney general's office, which oversees the agency, confirmed in a statement that Osofsky would stand down on 28 August 2023 “after serving my full tenure”. A "Report and Recommendations from The Shadow Attorney General’s Office” says a series of high-profile errors and scandals have called the current leadership and culture of the SFO into question, undermining morale at the organisation, and increasing the likelihood that yet more of its experienced staff will be poached by corporate law firms."

== Personal life ==
Osofsky is married to fellow lawyer Marc Wassermann.
