= Anglo-Eastern Group =

Ship management company

Anglo-Eastern Univan Group
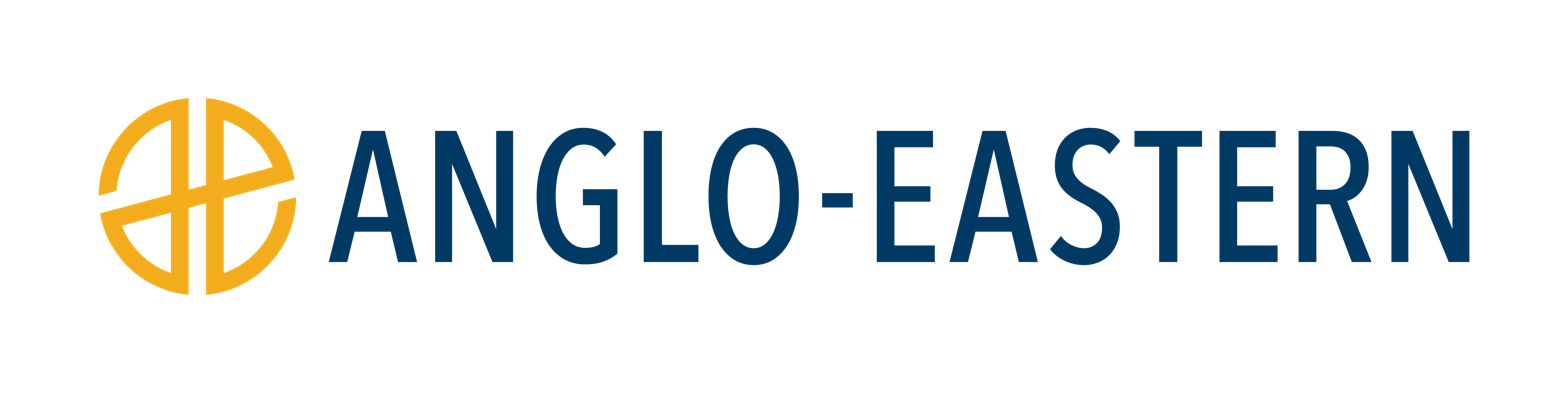
- Company type: Ship management
- Industry: Maritime
- Founded: 1974
- Headquarters: 17/F Kingston International Centre, 19 Wang Chiu Road, Kowloon Bay, Kowloon, Hong Kong
- Key people: Peter Cremers (Chairman); Bjorn Hojgaard (CEO); Carsten Ostenfeldt (COO); Mark Stevenson (CFO); Torbjorn Dimblad (CIO); Niraj Nanda (CCO)
- Services: Ship Management, Crew Management, Technical Services, Offshore, Education & Training
- Number of employees: Around 2,350 shore staff and over 39,000 seafarers
- Website: http://www.angloeastern.com/

Anglo-Eastern, also known as Anglo-Eastern Univan Group, is a ship management company, with over 700 ships under third-party management. The company was formed by an August 2015 merger between Anglo-Eastern and Hong Kong–based Univan. As of November 2018, it was the largest ship manager in the world (by number of ships), and the second largest in the world (by number of seafarers).

== History ==
Peter Cremers established Anglo-Eastern in 1974, initially as a chartering and ship owning organization, with Anglo-Eastern Management Services being the in-house manager of the ships. The latter was the start of the present Anglo-Eastern Univan Group. A 1998 management buyout and a subsequent merger with an established UK ship manager, Denholm Ship Management in 2001, established the present Anglo-Eastern Group as an independent, global ship manager. In May 2012, the company entered a partnership agreement with the Teekay group, assisting them with crew management and training.

By September 2013, Anglo-Eastern was managing more than 450 vessels, consisting mostly of container ships, bulk carriers and tankers (crude oil, product and chemical), heavy lift vessels (owned by Dockwise—a Dutch company) and a few general cargo and RoRo vessels. In August 2015, Anglo-Eastern merged with Univan Group and was renamed Anglo-Eastern Univan Group, with a combined total of almost 24,000 employees, and combined third party management of nearly 600 ships.

== Offices ==
Since April 2020, Anglo-Eastern has had its head office in Kowloon Bay, Hong Kong, where it occupies three floors in Kingston International Centre, 19 Wang Chiu Road. Additionally, the company has more than 30 locations across Asia-Pacific, Europe and the Americas, including but not limited to Singapore, Mumbai, Manila, Antwerp, Hamburg, Goes, Glasgow, Odesa and London. It employs more than 39,000 seafarers from multiple countries, with a majority of its seafarers coming from India, Philippines, Ukraine, Latvia and China. It also has one of the largest maritime training centres in India, located in Mumbai (also Delhi), a large cadet training academy in nearby Karjat (Anglo-Eastern Maritime Academy), and additional training centres in Odesa, Manila and mainland China.
