= Nick Ephgrave =

British police officer

Nick Ephgrave QPM

Director of the Serious Fraud Office
- Incumbent
- Assumed office 25 September 2023
- Minister: Victoria Prentis; The Lord Hermer
- Preceded by: Lisa Osofsky

Assistant Commissioner Frontline Policing Metropolitan Police Service
- In office September 2020 – September 2022
- Preceded by: Mark Simmons

Assistant Commissioner Met Operations Metropolitan Police Service
- In office January 2019 – September 2020
- Preceded by: Steve House
- Succeeded by: Louisa Rolfe

Chief Constable of Surrey Police
- In office December 2015 – January 2019
- Preceded by: Lynne Owens
- Succeeded by: Gavin Stephens

Personal details
- Profession: Police officer

Nicholas Bevan Ephgrave QPM is a senior British police officer. He is the Director of the Serious Fraud Office. He was previously Assistant Commissioner of the Metropolitan Police Service. He was senior investigating officer on the re-investigation of Damilola Taylor's murder.

== Early life and education ==
Ephgrave was born in Surrey, England. His first career was as a physicist in the National Health Service.

== Policing career ==
He first became an officer in the Metropolitan Police Service, rising to Commander of Lambeth Borough before becoming Chief Constable of Surrey Police (2016–2018). He then returned to the Metropolitan Police as Assistant Commissioner for Met Operations. In June 2016, he received the Queen's Police Medal. He also headed the National Police Chiefs' Council's Coordination Committee on Criminal Justice and was due to leave the Metropolitan Police to take up a new temporary post with the Council later in 2022.

On 8 December 2024, Ephgrave raised concerns about a significant "brain drain" of whistleblowers leaving the country owing to the absence of financial incentives. This situation has reportedly severely impacted the Serious Fraud Office's ability to combat corporate fraud, as many whistleblowers with critical information on economic crimes are opting to provide their intelligence to jurisdictions such as the United States, where they can receive monetary rewards for their disclosures.

Ephgrave has advocated for the establishment of a similar reward scheme in the UK that would compensate whistleblowers for information leading to successful convictions. He has emphasised that the current lack of incentives represents a substantial missed opportunity for tackling financial misconduct. Ephgrave has pointed out that if this situation pertained to issues such as terrorism or child abuse, there would be widespread outrage; thus, he argues that a proactive approach is necessary to enhance the UK's capacity to address serious fraud and corruption effectively.

== Honours ==

Ribbon	Description	Notes
	Queen's Police Medal (QPM)	Distinguished Service; 2016 Queen's Birthday Honours List
	Queen Elizabeth II Golden Jubilee Medal	2002
	Queen Elizabeth II Diamond Jubilee Medal	2012
	Queen Elizabeth II Platinum Jubilee Medal	2022
	Police Long Service and Good Conduct Medal	
