= Bank of Credit and Commerce International =

Defunct bank founded to commit fraud and other crimes (1972–1991)

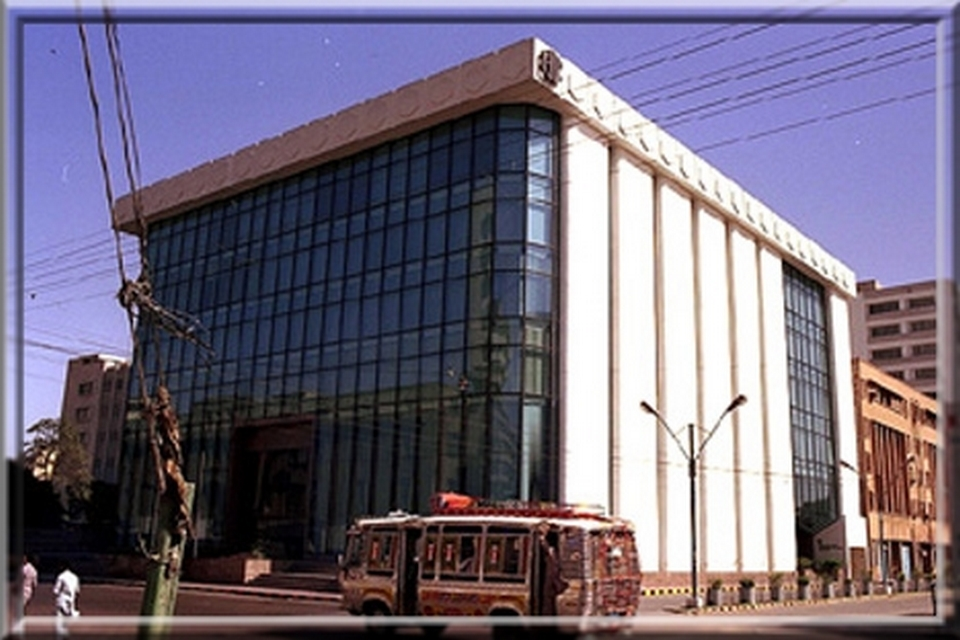
- Type: Private
- Industry: Banking
- Founded: 1972; 54 years ago
- Founder: Agha Hasan Abedi
- Defunct: July 1991; 35 years ago
- Fate: Liquidation, forced closure
- Headquarters: Karachi & London
- Area served: Worldwide
- Key people: Agha Hasan Abedi (chairman); Swaleh Naqvi (CEO)
- Products: Financial services
- Owner: Sheikh Zayed (77%)

The Bank of Credit and Commerce International (BCCI) was an international bank founded in 1972 by Agha Hasan Abedi, a Pakistani financier. The bank was registered in Luxembourg with head offices in Karachi and London. A decade after opening, BCCI had more than 400 branches in 78 countries and assets in excess of US$20 billion, making it the seventh largest private bank in the world.

BCCI came under the scrutiny of financial regulators and intelligence agencies in the 1980s, due to concerns that it was poorly regulated. Subsequent investigations revealed that it was involved in massive money laundering and other financial crimes, and had illegally gained controlling interest in a major American bank. BCCI became the focus of a massive regulatory battle in 1991, and, on 5 July of that year, customs and bank regulators in seven countries raided and locked down records of its branch offices during Operation C-Chase.

Investigators in the United States and the UK determined that BCCI had been "set up deliberately to avoid centralized regulatory review, and operated extensively in bank secrecy jurisdictions. Its affairs were extraordinarily complex. Its officers were sophisticated international bankers whose apparent objective was to keep their affairs secret, to commit fraud on a massive scale, and to avoid detection".

The liquidators, Deloitte & Touche, filed a lawsuit against the bank's auditors, Price Waterhouse and Ernst & Young, which was settled for $175 million in 1998. By 2013, Deloitte & Touche claimed to have recovered about 75% of the creditors' lost money.

BCCI continues to be cited as a lesson to be heeded by leading figures in the world of finance and banking. In March 2023, the United States' Acting Comptroller of the Currency Michael J. Hsu stated that "there are strong parallels between FTX and the Bank of Credit and Commerce International, better known in bank regulatory circles as BCCI, which failed in 1991 and led to significant changes in how global banks are supervised."

== History ==
BCCI's founder, Agha Hasan Abedi, established the bank in 1972. Abedi, a prolific banker, had previously set up the United Bank Limited in Pakistan in 1959 sponsored by Saigols. Preceding the nationalization of United Bank Limited in 1974, he sought to create a new supranational banking entity. BCCI was created with capital 25% of which came from Bank of America and the remaining 75% from Sheikh Zayed bin Sultan Al Nahyan, the ruler of Abu Dhabi in the United Arab Emirates.

BCCI expanded rapidly in the 1970s, pursuing long-term asset growth over profits, seeking high-net-worth individuals and regular large deposits. The company itself divided into BCCI Holdings with the bank under that splitting into BCCI SA (Luxembourg) and BCCI Overseas (Grand Cayman). BCCI also acquired parallel banks through acquisitions: buying the Banque de Commerce et Placements (BCP) of Geneva in 1976, and creating KIFCO (Kuwait International Finance Company), Credit & Finance Corporation Ltd, and a series of Cayman-based companies held together as ICIC (International Credit and Investment Company Overseas, International Credit and Commerce [Overseas], etc.). Overall, BCCI expanded from 19 branches in five countries in 1973 to 27 branches in 1974 and 108 branches by 1976, with assets growing from $200 million to $1.6 billion. This growth caused extensive underlying capital problems. The Guardian alleged that BCCI was using cash from deposits to fund operating expenses, rather than making investments. Investigative journalist and author Joseph J. Trento has argued that the bank's transformation was guided by the head of Saudi intelligence with a view to enabling it to finance covert American intelligence operations at a time, in the aftermath of Watergate, when the American intelligence agencies were defending themselves from investigations by domestic authorities.

In 1973, the BCCI applied for an offshore banking licence in Singapore that was rejected by the Monetary Authority of Singapore (MAS) on the basis that the bank was too new at just a year old and low in capitalisation. In 1980, they attempted to reapply but were yet again turned down by the MAS on the basis of its weak international regard.

BCCI entered the African markets in 1979, and Asia in the early 1980s. BCCI was among the first foreign banks awarded a license to operate in the Chinese Shenzhen Special Economic Zone which bore testament to Agha Hasan Abedi's public relations skills, a feat that had yet to be achieved by the likes of Citicorp and JP Morgan. Some of China's largest state banks were depositors in BCCI's Shenzhen branch.

There was rigid compartmentalization; the 248 managers and general managers reported directly to Abedi and the CEO Swaleh Naqvi. It was structured in such a way that no single country had overall regulatory supervision over it so as not to hinder potential growth and expansion opportunities. Its two holding companies were based in Luxembourg and the Cayman Islands – two jurisdictions where banking regulation was notoriously weak. It was also not regulated by a country that had a central bank. On several occasions, the Office of the Comptroller of the Currency, a bureau within the U.S. Department of the Treasury that regulates national banks, told the Federal Reserve in no uncertain terms that BCCI must not be allowed to buy any American bank because it was poorly regulated.

By 1980, BCCI was reported to have assets of more than $4 billion with more than 150 branches in 46 countries. Bank of America was "bewildered" by BCCI and reduced its holding in 1980, and the company came to be held by a number of groups, with International Credit and Investment Corp ('ICIC') owning 70%. By 1989, ICIC's shareholding was reduced to 11% with Abu Dhabi groups holding almost 40%. However, large numbers of shares were held by BCCI nominees.

In 1982, 15 Middle Eastern investors bought Financial General Bankshares, a large bank holding company headquartered in Washington, D.C. All the investors were BCCI clients, but the Fed received assurances that BCCI would be in no way involved in the management of the company, which was renamed First American Bankshares. To alleviate regulators' concerns, Clark Clifford, an adviser to five presidents, was named First American's chairman. Clifford headed a board composed of himself and several other distinguished American citizens, including former United States Senator Stuart Symington. In truth, BCCI had been involved in the purchase of FGB/First American from the beginning. Abedi had been approached about buying it as early as 1977, but by this time BCCI's reputation in the United States was so poor that it could not hope to buy an American bank on its own (as mentioned above, the OCC was adamantly opposed to BCCI's being allowed to buy its way into the American banking industry). Rather, it used the First American investors as nominees. Moreover, Clifford's law firm was retained as general counsel, and also handled most of BCCI's American legal work. BCCI was also heavily involved in First American personnel matters. The relationship between the two was so close that rumors spread BCCI was the real owner of First American.

BCCI had an unusual annual auditing system: Price Waterhouse were the accountants for BCCI Overseas, while Ernst & Young audited BCCI and BCCI Holdings (London and Luxembourg). Other companies such as KIFCO and ICIC were audited by neither. In October 1985, the Bank of England and the Monetary Institute of Luxembourg (Luxembourg's bank regulator) ordered BCCI to change to a single accountant, alarmed at reported BCCI losses on the commodities and financial markets. Price Waterhouse became the bank's sole accountant in 1987.

In 1990, a Price Waterhouse audit of BCCI revealed an unaccountable loss of hundreds of millions of dollars. The bank approached Sheikh Zayed bin Sultan Al Nahyan, who made good the loss in exchange for an increased shareholding of 78%. Much of BCCI's documentation was then transferred to Abu Dhabi. The audit also revealed numerous irregularities. Most seriously, BCCI had made a staggering $1.48 billion worth of loans to its own shareholders, who used BCCI stock as collateral.

The audit also confirmed what many Americans who watched BCCI long suspected – that BCCI secretly (and illegally) owned First American. When the Fed cleared the group of Arab investors to buy First American, it did so on the condition that they supplement their personal funds with money borrowed from banks with no connection to BCCI. Contrary to that agreement, several stockholders had borrowed heavily from BCCI. Even more seriously, they pledged their First American stock as collateral. When they failed to make interest payments, BCCI took control of the shares. It was later estimated that in this manner, BCCI had ended up with 60% or more of First American's stock.

Despite these problems, Price Waterhouse signed BCCI's 1989 annual report, largely due to Zayed's firm commitment to propping up the bank. Abedi was succeeded by Swaleh Naqvi as the bank's chief, who, in the aftermath following controversy over BCCI, was replaced by Zafar Iqbal Chaudhry in the late 1980s.

== Lending practices ==
BCCI contended that its growth was fueled by the increasingly large number of deposits by oil-rich states that owned stock in the bank as well as by sovereign developing nations. However, this claim failed to mollify the regulators. For example, the Bank of England ordered BCCI to cap its branch network in the United Kingdom at 45 branches.

There was particular concern over BCCI's loan portfolio, because of its roots in areas where modern banking was still an alien concept. For instance, a large number of its customers were devout Muslims who are against charging interest on loans – a major pillar of modern banking – because they consider it to be riba, or usury. In many third-world countries, a person's financial standing did not matter as much as his relationship with his banker. One particularly notable example is the Gokal family, a prominent family of shipping magnates. The three Gokal brothers, Abbas, Mustafa and Murtaza, were owners of the Gulf Group. They had a relationship with Abedi dating back to his days at United Bank. Abedi personally handled their loans, with little regard for details such as loan documents or creditworthiness. At one point, BCCI's loans to the Gokal companies were equivalent to US$1.2 billion, three times the bank's capital. The case of Nazmu Virani, the UK based property tycoon who borrowed £500 million unsecured, was widely reported. Longstanding banking practice dictates that a bank not lend more than 10% of its capital to a single customer.

== Money laundering ==
In addition to violations of lending laws, BCCI was also accused of opening accounts or laundering money for figures such as Saddam Hussein, Manuel Noriega, Hussain Muhammad Ershad, and Samuel Doe, and for criminal organizations, such as the Medellín Cartel and Abu Nidal. Police and intelligence experts nicknamed BCCI the "Bank of Crooks and Criminals International" for its penchant for catering to customers who dealt in arms, drugs, and hot money. Both Syed A. Hussain (b. 1960 or 1961) and Amjad Awan, (b. 1946 or 1947) a Pakistani banker that headed the Panamanian branch of BCCI in the early 1980s, assisted Noriega with Noriega's accounts at BCCI.

William von Raab, a former U.S. Commissioner of Customs, also told the Kerry Committee that the U.S. Central Intelligence Agency held "several" accounts at BCCI. According to a 1991 article in Time magazine, the National Security Council also had accounts at BCCI, which were used for a variety of covert operations, including transfers of money and weapons during the Iran–Contra affair. In 1991, due to Congressional oversight, the CIA admitted that it was aware of BCCI's illegal money laundering activities related to drugs.

== Investigations begin ==
BCCI's demise began in 1986, when a U.S. Customs undercover operation led by Special Agent Robert Mazur infiltrated the bank's private client division in Tampa, Florida, and uncovered their active role soliciting deposits from drug traffickers and money launderers. This two-year undercover operation concluded in 1988 with a fake wedding that was attended by BCCI officers and drug dealers from around the world, who had established a personal friendship and working relationship with undercover agent Mazur. At the same time he was dealing undercover with BCCI executives, Mazur used his undercover operation to establish a relationship with the hierarchy of the Medellín Cartel as one of their sources for laundering drug proceeds. Mazur's and others' roles in the sting operation were highlighted in the film The Infiltrator (2016, adapted from the eponymous autobiography).

In 1988, the bank was implicated as the center of a major money laundering scheme. After a six-month trial, BCCI, under immense pressure from U.S. authorities, pleaded guilty in 1990, but only on the grounds of respondeat superior. While federal regulators took no action, Florida regulators forced BCCI to pull out of the state.

In 1990, U.S. Senator Orrin Hatch presented an impassioned defense of the bank in a speech on the Senate floor. He and his aide, Michael Pillsbury, were involved in efforts to counter the negative publicity that surrounded the bank, and Hatch solicited the bank to approve a $10 million loan to a close friend, Monzer Hourani.

== Sandstorm report ==
In March 1991, the Bank of England asked Price Waterhouse to carry out an inquiry. On 24 June 1991, using the code name "Sandstorm" for BCCI, Price Waterhouse submitted the Sandstorm report showing that BCCI had engaged in "widespread fraud and manipulation" that made it difficult, if not impossible, to reconstruct BCCI's financial history.

The Sandstorm report, parts of which were leaked to The Sunday Times, included details of how the Abu Nidal terrorist group had manipulated details and through using fake identities had opened accounts at BCCI's Sloane Street branch in London. Britain's internal security service, MI5, had signed up two sources inside the branch to hand over copies of all documents relating to Abu Nidal's accounts. One source was the Syrian-born branch manager, Ghassan Qassem, the second a young British employee.

The Abu Nidal link man for the BCCI accounts was a man based in Iraq named Samir Najmeddin or Najmedeen. Throughout the 1980s, BCCI had set up millions of dollars' worth of letters of credit for Najmeddin, largely for arms deals with Iraq. Qassem later swore in an affidavit that Najmeddin was often accompanied by an American, whom Qassem subsequently identified as the financier Marc Rich. Rich was later indicted in the United States for tax evasion and racketeering in an apparently unrelated case and fled the country.

Qassem also told reporters that he had once escorted Abu Nidal, who was allegedly using the name Shakir Farhan, around town to buy a tie, without realizing who he was. This revelation led in 1991 to one of the London Evening Standard's best-known front-page headlines: "I Took Abu Nidal Shopping".

== Forced closure ==
BCCI was awaiting final approval for a restructuring plan in which it would have re-emerged as the "Oasis Bank". However, after the Sandstorm report, regulators concluded BCCI was so fraught with problems that it had to be seized. It had already been ordered to shut down its American operations in March for its illegal control of First American.

On 5 July 1991, regulators persuaded a court in Luxembourg to order BCCI liquidated on the grounds that it was hopelessly insolvent. According to the court order, BCCI had lost more than its entire capital and reserves the year before. At 1 pm London time that day (8 am in New York City), regulators marched into BCCI's offices and shut them down. Around a million depositors were immediately affected by this action.

On 7 July 1991, Hong Kong Office of the Commissioner of Banking (predecessor of the Hong Kong Monetary Authority) ordered BCCI to shut down its business in Hong Kong on the grounds that BCCI had problem loans and the Sheikh of Abu Dhabi, the major shareholder of BCCI, refused to provide funds to the Hong Kong BCCI. Hong Kong BCCI was liquidated on 17 July 1991.

A few weeks after the seizure, on 29 July, Manhattan District Attorney Robert Morgenthau announced that a Manhattan grand jury had indicted BCCI, Abedi and Naqvi on twelve counts of fraud, money laundering, and larceny. Morgenthau, who had been investigating BCCI for more than two years, claimed jurisdiction because millions of dollars laundered by the bank flowed through Manhattan. Also, Morgenthau cited BCCI's secret ownership of First American, which operated a subsidiary in New York City. Morgenthau said that all of BCCI's deposits had been fraudulently collected because the bank misled depositors about its ownership structure and financial condition. He described BCCI as "the largest bank fraud in world financial history".

On 15 November, BCCI, Abedi and Naqvi were indicted on federal charges that it had illegally bought control of another American bank, Independence Bank of Los Angeles, using Saudi businessman Ghaith Pharaon as the puppet owner.

Just a month later, BCCI's liquidators (Deloitte, PWC) pleaded guilty to all criminal charges pending against the bank in the United States (both those lodged by the federal government and by Morgenthau), clearing the way for BCCI's formal liquidation that fall. BCCI paid $10 million in fines and forfeited all $550 million of its American assets – at the time, the largest single criminal forfeiture ever obtained by federal prosecutors. The money was used to repay losses to First American and Independence and to make restitution to BCCI's depositors. None of this was enough to rescue both banks, however; Independence was seized later in 1992, while First American was forced into a sale to First Union in 1993.

Many of the major players in the scandal have never been brought to trial in American or UK courts. Abedi, for example, died in 1995. He was under indictment in the United States and UK for crimes related to BCCI, but Pakistani officials refused to give him up for extradition because they felt the charges were politically motivated. Even without this to consider, he had been in poor health since suffering a stroke in the 1980s. Pharaon remained a fugitive until his death in 2017.

In 2002, Denis Robert and Ernest Backes, former number three of financial clearing house Clearstream, discovered that BCCI had continued to maintain its activities after its official closure, with microfiches of Clearstream's illegal unpublished accounts.

Estimates of financial losses range from $10 billion to $17 billion, though some of it has been recovered by the bank's liquidators, Deloitte & Touche.

== American inquiries and legal actions ==
In 1991, Robert Mueller declared the government had been investigating BCCI since 1986 resulting in intense media coverage.

In 1992, United States Senators John Kerry and Hank Brown became the co-authors of a report on BCCI, which was delivered to the Committee on Foreign Relations. The BCCI scandal was one of a number of disasters that influenced thinking leading to the Public Interest Disclosure Act (PIDA) of 1998. The report found that Clifford and his legal/business partner Robert A. Altman had been closely involved with the bank from 1978, when they were introduced to BCCI by Bert Lance, the former director of the Office of Management and Budget, to 1991. Earlier, Pharaon was revealed to have been the puppet owner of National Bank of Georgia, a bank formerly owned by Lance before being sold back to First American (it had previously been an FGB subsidiary before Lance bought it). Clifford and Altman testified that they had never observed any suspicious activity, and had themselves been deceived about BCCI's control of First American. However, the federal government and Morgenthau contended that the two men knew, or should have known, that BCCI controlled First American. Pharaon also was revealed to be the puppet controlling owner of CenTrust Bank in Miami, Florida.

Morgenthau and the federal government brought indictments against Clifford and Altman, but did not pursue Clifford due to his age and deteriorating health (he died in 1998). Altman was indicted and tried in New York, though he was ultimately acquitted following a jury verdict of not guilty. Altman later accepted a de-facto lifetime ban from any role in the banking industry to settle a civil suit by the Fed.

== British inquiry and litigation ==
The British government set up an independent inquiry, chaired by Lord Justice Bingham, in 1992. Its House of Commons Paper, Inquiry into the Supervision of the Bank of Credit and Commerce International, was published in October of that year. Following the report, BCCI liquidators Deloitte Touche filed suit against the Bank of England for £850m, claiming that the Bank was guilty of misfeasance in public office. The suit lasted 12 years. It ended in November 2005, when Deloitte withdrew its claims after England's High Court ruled that it was "no longer in the best interests of creditors" for the litigation to continue. Deloitte eventually paid the Bank of England £73 million for its legal costs. According to news reports at the time, it was the most expensive case in British legal history.

== Litigation elsewhere ==
Although major litigation has ended in the case, suits and legal actions relating to the bank were still being brought in 2013, more than 20 years after the bank's failure.

== Former directors ==
- Khalid bin Mahfouz – non-executive director. Mahfouz and his brothers owned a 20% stake in BCCI between 1986 and 1990.
- Alfred Hartmann
- Shaikh Mohammed Ishaq

== Legal cases involving BCCI ==
- Bank of Credit and Commerce International SA v Aboody [1992] 4 All ER 955, pre-collapse case, later overturned, on the criteria for undue influence if someone is pressured into signing a mortgage agreement
- Mahmud and Malik v Bank of Credit and Commerce International SA [1998] AC 20, where employees sued the bank for breach of mutual trust and confidence by carrying on unlawful activities and thereby tarnishing the employees' reputations.
- Bank of Credit and Commerce International (Overseas) Ltd v Akindele [2000] EWCA Civ 502

== See also ==
- Abu Nidal
- Agha Hasan Abedi
- Kamal Adham
- Danny Casolaro
- Abbas Gokal
- The Infiltrator (2016 film)
- The International (2009 film)
- American Conspiracy: The Octopus Murders (2024 film)
- List of banks in Luxembourg

== General and cited references ==
- Adams, James Ring; Frantz, Douglas (1991). A Full Service Bank. London.
- Brisard, Jean-Charles; Dasquié, Guillaume (2002). Ben Laden: La Vérité interdite. Gallimard. pp. 166–168. ISBN 978-2-07-042377-4.
- Ehrenfeld, Rachel (1992). Evil Money. Encounters along the Money Trail. Harper Business. ISBN 978-0-88730-560-3.
- Kerry, John; Brown, Hank (December 1992). The BCCI Affair, Report to the Committee on Foreign Relations States Senate; held at FAS] – (A Report to the Committee on Foreign Relations United States Senate by Senator John Kerry and Senator Hank Brown (Print ed.). 102d Congress 2d Session Senate. pp. 102–140.
- Robert, Denis; Backes, Ernest (2001). Révélations. Arènes Editions. ISBN 978-2-912485-28-1.
- Price Waterhouse (24 June 1991). Report on Sandstorm SA [Part 1] (PDF) (Report). London: Bank of England. Archived from the original (PDF) on 21 July 2021 – via Association for Accountancy & Business Affairs. The UK Government spent 20 years attempting to suppress parts of the document; these are highlighted in red boxes on this copy
- Price Waterhouse (24 June 1991). Report on Sandstorm SA [Part 2] (PDF) (Report). London: Bank of England. Archived from the original (PDF) on 21 July 2021 – via Association for Accountancy & Business Affairs.
- Kochan, Nick & Whittington, Bob. Bankrupt: The BCCI Fraud, London 1991
- Adams, James Ring & Frantz, Douglas. A Full Service Bank, London 1991
- "Case study: Bank of Credit and Commerce International", Erisk, June 2001, (via Internet Archive), retrieved October 1, 2007,
- List of BCCI reports, Association of Accountancy and Business Affairs, retrieved November 9, 2005. Archived from the original on 10 November 2005.
