= Revenue and Customs Prosecutions Office =

The Revenue and Customs Prosecution Office (RCPO) was a non-departmental public body created under the Commissioners for Revenue and Customs Act 2005 as an independent prosecution body to take responsibility in England, Wales and Northern Ireland for the prosecution of criminal offences in cases previously within the purview of the Inland Revenue and HM Customs and Excise (HMCE). In Scotland it was a Specialist Reporting Agency and the cases are then prosecuted by the Crown Office and Procurator Fiscal Service. It was merged with the Crown Prosecution Service on 1 January 2010.

== History ==
An increase in the independence of prosecutors from the compliance and investigation staff at the revenue departments was recommended by the Gower-Hammond Report in December 2000 and the Butterfield report in July 2003 following recent scandals and failed prosecutions, including the collapse of the London City Bond trial for evasion of tens of millions of pounds of excise duties as a result of the non-disclosure of the involvement of an unpaid Customs informant.

The RCPO was established on 18 April 2005, and was independent of HM Revenue and Customs (the new government department also created on 18 April 2005 under the Commissioners for Revenue and Customs Act 2005 by the merger of the Inland Revenue and HMCE). A memorandum of understanding laid out the boundaries between the work of the RCPO and HMRC. The RCPO is superintended by the Attorney General, and David Green QC was appointed as the first Director of the Customs and Excise Prosecutions in December 2004. RCPO coordinated its efforts with those of the Crown Prosecution Service (CPS) and, from its inception in April 2006, the Serious Organised Crime Agency (SOCA).

In its first year, to April 2006, it dealt with over 1700 cases, with over 75% guilty pleas and convictions in 90% of cases; obtained 411 confiscation orders, for a total of £36,617,204, of which £21,167,236 was collected by 11 April 2006. On 11 April 2006, it had 255 staff, including 80 lawyers, and an annual budget of £35.6 million.

Following an announcement by the Attorney General in April 2009, on 1 January 2010 the RCPO was merged with the Crown Prosecution Service, forming a new Revenue and Customs Division within the CPS, with the Director of Public Prosecution (DPP), Keir Starmer, additionally being appointed to the statutory position of Director of Revenue and Customs Prosecutions. That office was abolished and merged with the office of DPP on 27 March 2014.

== Organisation ==
RCPO was created by the Commissioners for Revenue and Customs Act 2005, as an independent prosecuting authority similar to the Crown Prosecution Service, but primarily prosecuting cases investigated by HM Revenue and Customs. Although RCPO began work when the CRC Act came into force in April 2005, its prosecutors were initially drawn from the merger of the Customs & Excise Prosecutions Office (CEPO) (which was itself established in 2003 from the previous HM Customs and Excise Solicitors' Office) and the Inland Revenue Crime Group. It had approximately 290 staff, including around 80 lawyers, based at New King's Beam House in London SE1 and Ralli Quays in Manchester. The RCPO equivalent to CPS Crown Prosecutors were called "Revenue and Customs Prosecutors".

The RCPO handled approximately 2,500 cases each year. In its first six months, RCPO concluded 858 cases with convictions in 88% of them. It dealt with cases of fraud in relation to direct taxes (income tax, capital gains tax, inheritance tax, corporation tax) and indirect taxes (mainly VAT – notably multimillion-pound Missing Trader Intra-Community ("carousel") frauds), tax credits, drug smuggling, and money laundering, cases involving United Nations trade sanctions, conflict diamonds and CITES. The majority of cases involved drug trafficking prosecutions.
