= David Green (lawyer) =

British barrister

Sir David Green CB KC

Director of the Serious Fraud Office
- In office 2012 – April 2018
- Minister: Dominic Grieve; Jeremy Wright
- Preceded by: Richard Alderman
- Succeeded by: Lisa Osofsky

Personal details
- Born: David John Mark Green; 8 March 1954 (age 72)
- Education: St Catharine's College, Cambridge
- Profession: Barrister

Sir David John Mark Green CB KC (born 1954) is a British lawyer and prosecutor, who served from 2012 until 2018 as the Director of the Serious Fraud Office.

== Career ==
=== Career at the Bar ===
Green was born on 8 March 1954. Educated at Christ's Hospital and then St. Catharine's College, Cambridge, Green initially joined Defence Intelligence in 1975, leaving in 1978, being called to the Bar in 1979 and practising as a barrister. He has served as an assistant Recorder since 1996, and as a Recorder since 2000, when he was also appointed Queen's Counsel.

=== RCPO ===
In 2004, Green was appointed a Director of Customs and Excise, during the creation of HM Revenue and Customs, leading the Revenue and Customs Prosecutions Office (RCPO). He served in that position until 2010, when RCPO started being merged into the Crown Prosecution Service (CPS). He stayed as head until 2011, as the CPS's Director of its Central Fraud Group, being replaced by Sue Patten.

=== Brief return to private practice ===
In April 2011, Green returned to private practise, joining 6 King's Bench Walk chambers. Since his return to the Bar, he has been instructed in complex strategic export cases and as disclosure counsel in a substantial revenue fraud.

=== SFO ===
In 2012, Green was appointed to succeed Richard Alderman as the Director of the Serious Fraud Office. Appointing Green as Director of SFO, Attorney General Dominic Grieve commented:

I welcome David Green's appointment to this key post. He joins at a challenging and exciting time for the Serious Fraud Office. The government is committed to a better and more coordinated approach to economic crime and is putting the structures in place to effect this. The SFO will play an important role in this new strategy, working with Economic Crime Command partners and energetically pursuing the corruption and fraud which cause so much damage to victims, to law abiding competitors and to the UK's wider economy and reputation.

Green served his original four-year term, and was extended for two years in February 2016. Announcing extension of his appointment, Attorney General Jeremy Wright commented:

In his time as Director of the SFO David Green led a change in the organisation's approach to prosecuting cases and delivered the first UK Deferred Prosecution Agreement and the first convictions under the Bribery Act 2010. I look forward to working with him in the next phase of his leadership of the Serious Fraud Office.

As of 2015, Green was paid a salary of between £170,000 and £174,999, making him one of the 328 most highly paid people in the British public sector at that time.

Green left the SFO in April 2018, being replaced temporarily by the chief operating officer, Mark Thompson, and from September 2018 by Lisa Osofsky. On 22 October 2018, Green joined Magic Circle law firm Slaughter and May as a Senior Consultant.

=== Fraud Advisory Panel ===
on 1 January 2022, Green succeeded David Clarke as Chair of the Fraud Advisory Panel charity.

== Notable awards and rankings ==
In the Queen's Birthday Honours for 2011, he was appointed Companion of the Order of the Bath (CB). As part of the Queen's Birthday Honours in 2018, Green was made a Knight Bachelor.

== See also ==
- Criminal justice

Political offices
Preceded by ??? as Director, Customs and Excise; Prosecutions Office	Director, Revenue and Customs; Prosecutions Office; 2004–2010	Succeeded by Himself as Director, Central Fraud Group, Crown Prosecution Service
Preceded by ??? as Director, Crime Group, Inland Revenue	Director, Revenue and Customs; Prosecutions Office; 2004–2010	Succeeded by Himself as Director, Central Fraud Group, Crown Prosecution Service
Preceded by Himself as Director, Revenue and Customs; Prosecutions Office	Director, Central Fraud Group, Crown Prosecution Service; 2010–2011	Succeeded by Sue Patten
Preceded by Richard Alderman	Director, Serious Fraud Office; 2012–2018	Succeeded by Lisa Osofsky
