= Alfred Hartmann (banker) =

Swiss jurist, banker and business executive (1923–2010)

- Born: 21 February 1923; Zurich, Switzerland
- Died: 19 May 2010 (aged 87)
- Education: University of Zurich
- Occupations: Jurist, banker, business executive
- Known for: Director of the Bank of Credit and Commerce International; chairman of the Banque de Commerce et de Placements

Alfred Hartmann (21 February 1923 – 19 May 2010) was a Swiss jurist, banker and business executive. He became known primarily through his role as a director of the Bank of Credit and Commerce International (BCCI) and as chairman of the Geneva-based Banque de Commerce et de Placements (BCP), which was linked to BCCI. In connection with the collapse of BCCI in 1991, Hartmann was described in several investigations and press reports as an important figure within the bank’s international network.

== Early life and education ==
According to the British company register Companies House, Hartmann was born in February 1923 and was, among other places, resident in Herrliberg in the Canton of Zürich. He studied commercial law at the University of Zurich.

== Career ==
In British registry documents he is listed as a director of several companies. These included Bank of Credit and Commerce International S.A., where he was registered as a director on 2 April 1982, and another BCCI company, where his appointment was dated 17 July 1975. Hartmann worked for the Swiss military intelligence service and was chairman of the Swiss division of the Royal Bank of Scotland, a manager at UBS, and chairman of Roberto Calvi's Banco Ambrosiano in the Bahamas.

Before and alongside his banking activities, Hartmann was also active in Swiss industry. The Los Angeles Times described him in 1991 as chairman of the Swiss Society of Chemical Industries and a former deputy chairman of F. Hoffmann-La Roche. Hartmann had resigned as managing director of La Roche after a price-fixing scandal involving the European Community. A 1984 report in the Financial Times described Hartmann as a former managing director of F. Hoffmann-La Roche, until 1979, then vice-chairman of the company, and as general manager of Rothschild Bank in Zurich.

In 1987, Hartmann, who was internationally well connected, helped Harken Energy, a company closely associated with the Bush family, overcome a financial bottleneck by arranging the sale of a US$25 million block of shares to UBS. Hartmann was also appointed a director of Banque Privée Edmond de Rothschild S.A. in 1991, with his appointment dated 7 February 1991, and of N M Rothschild & Sons in 1992. According to press reports, he was also chairman of the Swiss arm of Banca Nazionale del Lavoro (BNL), from which he resigned in September 1991. In 1993 he resigned from Rothschild Bank after another scandal involving Rothschild director Jürg Heer, which concerned payments to the alleged murderers of Roberto Calvi of Banco Ambrosiano.

=== Activities at BCCI and BCP ===
Hartmann held various supervisory positions at the Bank of Credit and Commerce International between at least 1982 and 1991. BCCI was an international banking group that was closed in 1991 following investigations and regulatory action. The report of the investigating committee led by United States senators John Kerry and Hank Brown described Hartmann as one of BCCI's most important board members and also as chairman of the Geneva-based Banque de Commerce et de Placements, which was controlled by BCCI.

BCCI was an institution that for years had evaded effective control through complex corporate structures, bank secrecy jurisdictions and insufficient consolidated supervision. The so-called Sandstorm Report by Price Waterhouse, submitted to the Bank of England in June 1991, found evidence of extensive fraud and manipulation at BCCI; these findings led to the bank's worldwide closure on 5 July 1991. Later investigations found that BCCI had been involved in criminal activities worldwide and had been used, among other purposes, for laundering proceeds from drug trafficking.

He had been chairman of BCCI-owned Banque de Commerce et de Placements in Geneva until the bank was sold in July 1991. According to the report, BCP was a Swiss subsidiary or affiliated company of BCCI and played a significant role within the bank's extensive corporate network. The connection between BCCI and BCP was apparently obscured by complex corporate structures. BCP was described as an important component of the BCCI network; an indictment connected with money-laundering allegations against BCCI employees also mentioned transfers to BCP accounts.

=== Links to BNL and Bruce Rappaport ===
The Kerry–Brown report also mentioned Hartmann in connection with Banca Nazionale del Lavoro (BNL). BCCI was also linked to BNL, whose Atlanta branch was involved in a conspiracy to issue fraudulent loans of up to US$4 billion in order to facilitate illegal arms sales to the Iraqi government of Saddam Hussein. According to the report, Hartmann linked BCCI and BNL because he sat on the boards of both banks and at the same time headed BCP, which was controlled by BCCI. Hartmann had been chairman of a Zurich-based BNL subsidiary that routinely handled overnight transactions between BCCI and the Central Bank of Iraq.

The Kerry–Brown report further listed Hartmann in connection with the Swiss-Israeli businessman Bruce Rappaport. Rappaport had brought Hartmann, described as a prominent BCCI frontman, onto the board of his Intermaritime Bank in Geneva and New York; Hartmann also sat on the board of another Rappaport bank. Rappaport was a friend of CIA director William J. Casey and was apparently involved in numerous dubious transactions. In the 1980s, Hartmann acquired a melon farm in Antigua from Israeli arms dealers (Guns for Antigua) who were among BCCI's most important clients in Miami.

=== After the collapse of BCCI ===
After BCCI was closed, Banque de Commerce et de Placements was quickly sold to the Turkish Çukurova Group. According to The Independent, Hartmann assisted in the negotiations over this sale, which was completed a little more than two weeks after BCCI's worldwide closure. A Çukurova subsidiary named EndTrade had previously been a partner of BNL in illegal arms transactions with Iraq.

In 1994 Hartmann was one of three former BCCI directors who filed a lawsuit in New York against the ruler of Abu Dhabi, Zayed bin Sultan Al Nahyan, and other members of the ruling family. The plaintiffs accused the bank's majority shareholders of having been behind BCCI's frauds and of concealing them from outside directors, auditors, regulators and the public. Alongside Hartmann, Yves Lamarche and Johan Diderik Van Oenen appeared as plaintiffs. Hartmann himself was never prosecuted over the bank's collapse.

In 2001, Hartmann served on the supervisory board of Trendinvest in the Bahamas, in which Bernd Georg Herrdum's company GFTA held a stake. In the late 1980s, dubious foreign exchange transactions were conducted through GFTA and its subsidiary Trendinvest in the Bahamas. Bernd Georg Herrdum had recruited American businessman Charles Keating Jr. for the investment, and Keating Jr. sat on the supervisory board alongside Hartmann and Herrdum.

== Death ==
Hartmann died on 19 May 2010, at the age of 87.
