= Univan Ship Management =

Hong Kong based ship management company

Univan Ship Management Ltd.
- Company type: Shipping management, Crew Management
- Industry: Maritime, Shipping
- Founded: 1973
- Founder: Captain Charles Arthur Joseph Vanderperre
- Headquarters: North Point, Hong Kong
- Key people: Richard Hext; Bjørn Højgaard; Pradeep Ranjan; Jens Kier
- Products: Ship Management, Ship Chartering, Inspection, Conversion Supervision, New Building Supervision, Crew Management
- Number of employees: 200+ (On Shore)

Univan Ship Management Limited is a global Ship Management company, headquartered in Hong Kong. It is amongst the top 10 third party ship management companies globally. Univan has offices in India, Philippines, China, Dubai and Japan, and other agents all over the world. Univan also has a large training facility in India with expansive infrastructure for cadet and STCW training courses. Its simulators are considered to be one of the most modern simulators globally.

Univan's consistent record for safe and efficient operations of ships has led to various recognition from the industry bodies.

== History ==
Univan (abbreviation origin: "UNIted VANderperre") group of companies was established in 1973, by the late Capt. C A J Vanderperre, described as the father of third party ship management. In 1975, Univan took its first tanker ship "M.T. Sun Clipper" under technical management followed by establishing its own manning office in Mumbai, India, in 1976. Univan continued to grow over the next decade and between 1989 and 1991, Univan established its own manning office in Manila (Philippines), Yangon (Myanmar) and New Delhi (India). This was followed by new offices in Chennai (1994), Kochi (1995), Kolkota (2006), Dalian (2008) and Tokyo (2010).

In August 2015 the company merged with Anglo Eastern, forming Anglo Eastern Univan Group.

== Training setup ==
Univan inaugurated its first training academy in Kochi in 1996 followed by a much larger setup in Mumbai in 2005, operated under the name Univan Maritime Training Academy (UMTA). In 2006, Univan inaugurated its "ship maneuvering simulator" and full mission liquid handling simulator for five different oil and chemical gas cargo handling in Mumbai. In the following years, Univan also set up a training academy in Manila, Philippines.

== Joint ventures ==
Univan Ship Management has had joint ventures with several of the biggest names in shipping including Torben Karlshoej (who went on to set up Teekay), OMI, MSC, Clipper Group, Fred Cheng, Clarksons and Vlasov (the family behind V-Ships). These companies are very well known as major tanker owners, containership owners, dry bulk owners, ship managers and ship brokers.

== Ship Owning ==
Capt. Vanderperre, founder of Univan, created a ship owning JV under the name Vanship Holdings in early 2000. Vanships had a large fleet of VLCCs and some bulk carriers. These ships were managed by Univan Ship management. These ships were subsequently sold off in 2010, right before the crash in VLCC rates.

== Awards and recognition ==
- Lloyd's List Awards, Global, 2012 : Finalist - "Operator of the Year - Highly Recommended"
- Lloyd's List Awards, Asia, 2012 : Winner - "Ship Manager of the Year"
- Seatrade Asia Awards, 2012 - "Best Ship Manager"
- Lloyd's List Awards, Middle East & Indian Subcontinent, 2013 : Runners Up - "Maritime Services Award, Highly Recommended Runners Up"
- Lloyd's List Awards, Asia, 2013 : Winner - "Ship Manager of the Year, Highly Commended"
- IBJ Awards, 2013 - "Special Achievement Awards"
- Seatrade Asia Awards, 2013 - "Best Ship Manager"
- Lloyd's List Awards, Asia, 2014 : Winner - "Ship Manager of the Year"
