= CIBC Mortgages plc v Pitt =

United Kingdom legal case (1993)

- Court: House of Lords
- Full case name: CIBC Mortgages plc v Pitt and Another
- Decided: 21 October 1993
- Citation: [1994] 1 AC 200, [1993] 3 WLR 802, [1993] 4 All ER 433, [1993] UKHL 7
- Transcript: BAILII transcript

Court membership
- Judges sitting: Lord Browne-Wilkinson, Lord Templeman, Lord Woolf, Lord Slynne of Hadley, Lord Lowry

Case opinions
- Decision by: Lord Browne-Wilkinson

Keywords
- undue influence

CIBC Mortgages plc v Pitt [1993] UKHL 7 (21 October 1993) is a decision of the House of Lords relating to undue influence. The decision confirmed that a person did not need to suffer "manifest disadvantage" under a transaction in order to challenge it for actual undue influence (as opposed to "presumed" undue influence).

== Facts ==
In 1986 Mr Pitt told Mrs Pitt that he would like to borrow some money on the security of the family home and to use the loan to buy shares on the stock market. Mrs Pitt was not happy about this suggestion and made her feelings known to her husband. As a result, he embarked on a course of conduct putting pressure on Mrs Pitt which the trial judge held amounted to actual undue influence. In consequence, Mrs Pitt eventually agreed to the suggestion. The Pitts had originally purchased the house in 1970; they still lived in it, with their two adult daughters. In 1986 the property was valued at £270,000, the only encumbrance on it being a mortgage in favour of a building society for the modest sum of £16,700.

Mr Pitt made an application for a loan with CIBC Mortgages plc which was signed by both Mr and Mrs Pitt. The application form named both Mr and Mrs Pitt as the applicants for a loan of £150,000 for a period of 20 years, the purpose of the loan being expressed to be "proposed purchase of holiday home". The transaction was said to be a remortgage, the intention being to pay off the existing mortgage. Immediately above the space for the applicants' signatures, the printed form contained a declaration, amongst other things, that the information given in the application was true to the best of the applicants' knowledge and belief. Mrs Pitt did not read any of the pages of the application which had been filled in by somebody else although she did see the first and last pages.

On 6 June 1986 a written offer of mortgage was made by the plaintiff addressed to Mr and Mrs Pitt. It offered a loan of £150,000 for 19 years secured on the family home and also on a policy of assurance to be effected by Mr Pitt on his life. The purpose of the loan was expressed to be "remortgage". The offer also stated:

"It is understood that the proceeds of this advance are to be used to purchase a second property without the applicants resorting to any additional borrowing. Any more borrowing or change of use must be notified to the bank immediately."

It was not a condition that any property purchased with the borrowed moneys should be charged to the plaintiff. Mr and Mrs Pitt signed the mortgage offer to indicate their acceptance, but Mrs Pitt did not read it before signing. On 31 July 1986 the legal charge over the family home was executed. It was in standard form. Mrs Pitt signed the legal charge but did not read it. At no stage did Mrs Pitt receive any separate advice about the transaction nor did anyone suggest that she should do so. She did not know the amount that was being borrowed.

Mr Pitt applied the borrowed moneys to buy shares, apparently in his own name. On 9 October 1986 Mr Pitt charged any securities he had then deposited or thereafter deposited in favour of the Union Bank of Switzerland. It appears that he never liquidated any part of his holding and that he was charging securities he had bought with the moneys borrowed from the plaintiff in order to borrow more moneys to buy more shares. For a time, he was highly successful with his investments in that at one stage he was a millionaire on paper. In October 1987 the Stock Market crashed, his creditor banks sold the securities charged to them and Mr Pitt found himself in arrears in paying what was due under the charge. At the time of the trial in July 1992, the total sum owing under the legal charge was nearly £219,000, which exceeded the value of the family home.

== County Court and Court of Appeal ==
At the trial before Mr Recorder Davies, Mrs Pitt alleged, first, that she had been induced to enter into the legal charge by Mr Pitt falsely representing to her that the borrowed moneys were to be used to finance the purchase of shares to be held for capital appreciation and income, whereas his actual intention was to use the shares so acquired as collateral for further borrowings to purchase yet more shares. Mrs Pitt further alleged that she entered into the charge because of the undue influence of Mr Pitt, that she had not understood the nature of the obligation she was undertaking or the amount involved and that, since Mr Pitt had acted as the agent of the plaintiff, the charge should be set aside as against the plaintiff. CIBC, in addition to denying the claims made by Mrs Pitt, contended that the transaction was not manifestly disadvantageous to Mrs Pitt and that, following National Westminster Bank plc v Morgan [1985] AC 686, the claim based on undue influence could not succeed.

The trial judge held (1) that Mrs Pitt had not established any misrepresentation made to her by Mr Pitt; (2) that Mr Pitt had exercised actual undue influence on Mrs Pitt to procure her agreement; (3) that the transaction was manifestly disadvantageous to her and (4) that Mr Pitt had not acted as the agent of the plaintiff. On the law as he understood it Mrs Pitt could not set aside the transaction for either misrepresentation, or undue influence (actual or presumed).

Mrs Pitt appealed, and the Court of Appeal (Neill and Peter Gibson LJJ) dismissed Mrs Pitt's appeal

== Judgment ==
The sole reasoned judgment was delivered by Lord Browne-Wilkinson, with whom all the other law lords agreed. After reviewing the background, his Lordship focussed his analysis on two key points: (1) whether "manifest disadvantage" needed to be demonstrated, and (2) whether CIBC, as a third party, was on notice of any undue influence.

=== Manifest disadvantage requirement ===
After reviewing all of the relevant case law, Lord Browne-Wilkinson concluded that there was no requirement to demonstrate manifest disadvantage where actual (as opposed to presumed) undue influence was established. He said

In relation to manifest disadvantage My Lords, I am unable to agree with the Court of Appeal's decision in Aboody. I have no doubt that the decision in Morgan does not extend to cases of actual undue influence. Despite two references in Lord Scarman's speech to cases of actual undue influence, as I read his speech he was primarily concerned to establish that disadvantage had to be shown, not as a constituent element of the cause of action for undue influence, but in order to raise a presumption of undue influence with Class 2. That was the only subject matter before the House of Lords in Morgan and the passage I have already cited was directed solely to that point. With the exception of a passing reference to Ormes v. Beadel (1860) 2 Gif. 166, all the cases referred to by Lord Scarman were cases of presumed undue influence. In the circumstances, I do not think that this House can have been intending to lay down any general principle applicable to all claims of undue influence, whether actual or presumed." Whatever the merits of requiring a complainant to show manifest disadvantage in order to raise a Class 2 presumption of undue influence, in my judgment there is no logic in imposing such a requirement where actual undue influence has been exercised and proved. Actual undue influence is a species of fraud.

=== Notice ===
Having made that determination Lord Browne-Wilkinson held that Mrs Pitt would have been entitled to set aside the transaction against her husband. However, in order to succeed she would need to be able to set aside the transaction against CIBC, who was an innocent third party. In order to do so, CIBC would need to be on notice of the undue influence.

The trial judge had found as a fact that Mr Pitt was not the agent of CIBC, and so his knowledge of the undue influence could not be imputed to the bank. Accordingly, Mrs Pitt needed to show that the facts known to the plaintiff should put it on inquiry so as to fix it with constructive notice. However, there was nothing in the fact pattern which did so:

So far as the plaintiff [CIBC] was aware, the transaction consisted of a joint loan to husband and wife to finance the discharge of an existing mortgage on 26 Alexander Avenue, and as to the balance to be applied in buying a holiday home. The loan was advanced to both husband and wife jointly. There was nothing to indicate to the plaintiff that this was anything other than a normal advance to husband and wife for their joint benefit.

Accordingly, Mrs Pitt's claim failed. Even though she had been unduly influenced by her husband, the bank had no notice of this, and was accordingly its rights were not affected.

== Timing ==
The judgment was delivered on the same day as the House of Lords decision in Barclays Bank plc v O'Brien [1993] UKHL 6 (21 October 1993). However, the decision in O'Brien was handed down first, and accordingly, in his speech Lord Browne-Wilkinson refers to his reasoning in the O'Brien case. The composition of the judges in the House of Lords was identical in both cases.

== Commentary ==
The case is less relevant after the decision at the same, final, level in Royal Bank of Scotland plc v Etridge (No 2) [2001] UKHL 44 (11 October 2001) reformulating relevant tests for undue influence in third party (and potentially disinterested spouse/co-owner) cases involving bank loans. Accordingly, the decision in Pitt is normally only cited today by textbooks as supplementary authority for more general propositions, such as the absence of any requirement for direct threats to establish undue influence, or the fact that a joint loan to husband and wife will not of itself put the bank on inquiry of potential undue influence.

=== Application ===
==== Applied by ====
Darjan Estate Co plc v Hurley [2012] Ch D

Barclays Bank plc v Boulter [1997] CA (as to dicta/opinion of Lord Browne-Wilkinson)

==== Considered in ====
Barclays Bank plc v Coleman [2000] CA

==== Distinguished by ====
Dunbar Bank Plc v Nadeem [1997] Ch. D.

== See also ==
- Undue influence in English law
