= Agha Hasan Abedi =

Pakistani banker (1922–1995)

- آغا حسَن عابِدی
- Born: 14 May 1922; Lucknow, British India
- Died: 5 August 1995 (aged 73); Karachi, Pakistan
- Education: Lucknow University
- Occupation: Banker
- Years active: 1946–1990
- Known for: Founder of Bank of Credit and Commerce International
- Criminal penalty: 8 years prison
- Spouse: Rabia Abedi
- Children: 1

Agha Hasan Abedi (Urdu: آغا حسَن عابِدی; 14 May 1922 – 5 August 1995) was a Pakistani banker who founded Bank of Credit and Commerce International (BCCI) and saw its collapse after one of the biggest bank fraud scandals in history was unearthed. Before his death, he was convicted by the United Arab Emirates court of fraud and sentenced to eight years in prison. Abedi also founded United Bank Limited. Abedi underwent a heart transplant operation in 1988, and died of a heart attack on 5 August 1995 in Karachi.

== Early life and education ==
Agha Hasan Abedi was born in Lucknow, British India, to an Urdu-speaking middle class family with members who served as advisors and courtiers to the Nawab of Awadh. He received a master's degree in English literature and a law degree from Lucknow University. Abedi migrated to Pakistan after the creation of Pakistan in 1947.

== Career ==
Abedi began his career at the age of 24 when he joined Habib Bank Limited. In 1959, Abedi founded the United Bank Limited (UBL). He was the Founder and the first President. Under his stewardship, UBL became the second largest bank in Pakistan. Abedi introduced the concept of personalised service and banking support to trade and industry, paying particular attention to the bank's overseas operations. One of the first to comprehend the opportunities offered by the oil boom in the Persian Gulf, Abedi pioneered close economic collaboration in the private sector between Pakistan and the United Arab Emirates (UAE). The UAE President, Sheikh Zayed bin Sultan Al Nahyan, extended his patronage to UBL operations both in Pakistan and abroad.

=== Formation of the United Arab Emirates ===
A 1992 report by the United States Senate Committee on Foreign Relations states that Abedi developed a close financial and advisory relationship with Sheikh Zayed, beginning in the mid-1960s. At the time, Abu Dhabi was emerging as a major oil-producing state under traditional governance structures inherited from the Trucial States period. According to testimony cited in the report, Abedi initially provided banking services related to Pakistani workers in Abu Dhabi and later became a principal financial intermediary for Sheikh Zayed and his family. Former BCCI officials told Senate investigators that Abedi handled a wide range of financial, administrative, and logistical matters for Sheikh Zayed, and that this relationship expanded alongside Abu Dhabi’s growing oil revenues. The Senate report further notes that some former BCCI officials believed Abedi played an important role in facilitating Sheikh Zayed’s international recognition and in advancing the idea of a federation among the Gulf emirates, which culminated in the establishment of the UAE in 1971. According to this testimony, Abedi assisted Sheikh Zayed in early diplomatic engagements, including contacts with Pakistan and the United Kingdom, during the formative period of the UAE.

=== Bank of Credit and Commerce International ===
In 1972, Abedi started the Bank of Credit and Commerce International (BCCI) initially with funding of US$2.5 million only. For a decade, it was the fastest growing bank in the world. At its peak, it operated in more than seventy countries and had about 1.3 million depositors.

In 1988, he left because of poor health.

In July 1991, it was found by international regulators that the bank was involved in a massive fraud and money laundering for Colombian drug cartels, Abu Nidal Organization, and Central Intelligence Agency. Subsequently, its assets were seized.

Registered in Luxembourg, the BCCI began its operations from a two-room head office in London. It developed into a worldwide banking operation with branches in 72 countries and 16,000 employees. Abedi was personally responsible for inducing a large number of Pakistanis into the field of international banking and almost 80 per cent of the BCCI's top executive positions at the head office and in branches in various countries were held by Pakistanis. "It was founded by the charismatic Agha Hasan Abedi in 1972, backed by Middle Eastern investors and run mostly by the South Asians." Abedi severed his connection with BCCI in 1990 after suffering a heart attack and led a retired life in Karachi until his death due to heart failure at Aga Khan University Hospital, Karachi in 1995.

Abu Dhabi, through members of its ruling family and related entities, was a founding and majority shareholder in the BCCI. Although these holdings were publicly presented as major capital support, subsequent investigations found that some shares were held through nominee arrangements or were subject to guarantees that limited shareholder risk. Representatives associated with Abu Dhabi held positions within BCCI’s governance structure, and financial support was provided to the bank during periods of instability. Following BCCI’s collapse, access to certain documents and witnesses under Abu Dhabi’s control was limited, constraining aspects of international investigations into the bank’s ownership and operations.

=== Philanthropy ===
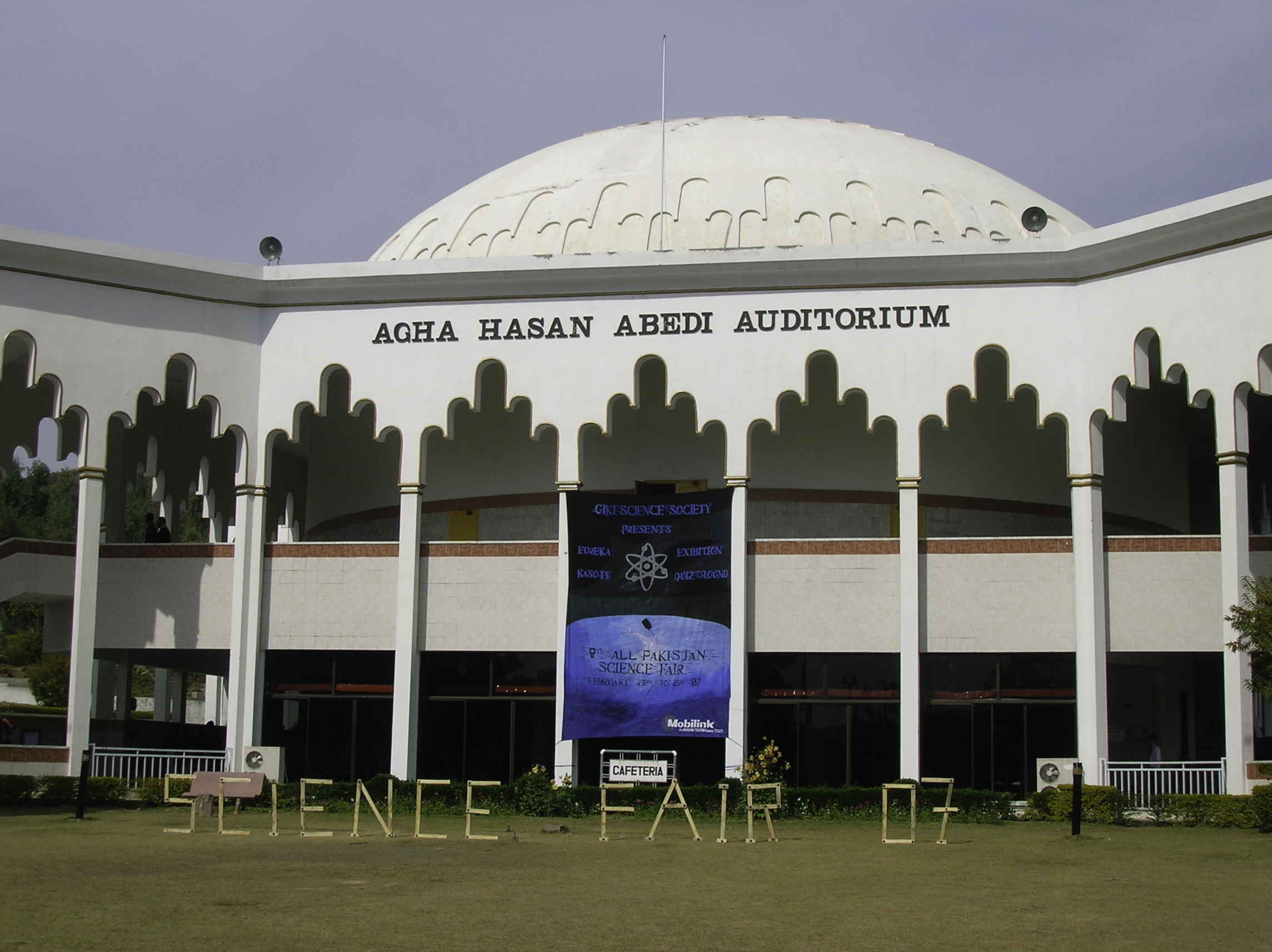
Agha Hasan Abedi Auditorium Ghulam Ishaq Khan Institute of Engineering Sciences and Technology at the 8th Science Fair in 2007

Abedi founded charitable organisations in UK, India, Bangladesh, Zimbabwe and Pakistan.

The Infaq Foundation has only one office in Karachi, Pakistan. It has capital and reserves of over Rs. 2.50 billion, which in 2009 is equivalent to just over US$30 million. Major beneficiaries among the known institutions are, Sindh Institute of Urology and Transplantation, National Institute of Cardiovascular Diseases, Lady Dufferin Hospital and Sir Syed University of Engineering and Technology in Karachi, and Ghulam Ishaq Khan Institute of Engineering Sciences and Technology in Topi, Khyber Pakhtunkhwa, Pakistan. Ghulam Ishaq Khan was the first Chairman of the Foundation from 1983 to 1995.

Abedi also founded BCCI FAST in 1980 with a donation of Rs. 100 million, to promote education in computer science. It is now the first multi-campus university of Pakistan, known as National University of Computer and Emerging Sciences. It has six campuses situated in Islamabad, Peshawar, Karachi, Lahore, Multan and Faisalabad.

Abedi also contributed funds to establish Ghulam Ishaq Khan Institute of Engineering Sciences and Technology.

== Personal life ==
Hasan Abedi was married to Rabia Abedi. The couple had a daughter named Maha. Abedi was born into a Shia Muslim family, and was a well-known Muslim mystic. During his speeches at the meetings of the BCCI Bank, he would spend hours sharing his mystical beliefs. He believed that BCCI was not only a bank, but a God-gifted entity that was directly connected to the universe.

== Award and honor ==
- Agha Hasan Abedi Auditorium at Ghulam Ishaq Khan Institute of Engineering Sciences and Technology, Swabi, Khyber Pakhtunkhwa, Pakistan, was named after him.
- Agha Hasan Abedi was posthumously awarded the Hilal-i-Imtiaz, a Pakistani Civilian Award, by the President of Pakistan in 2015 for his services to the nation.
