= Healthcare real estate =

Niche real estate market

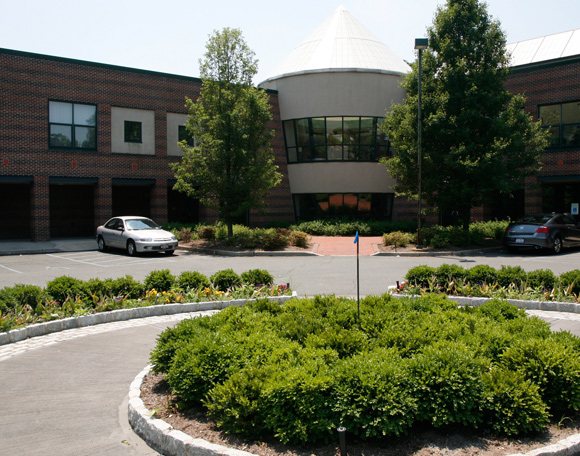
Children's Rehabilitation Center in White Plains, New York

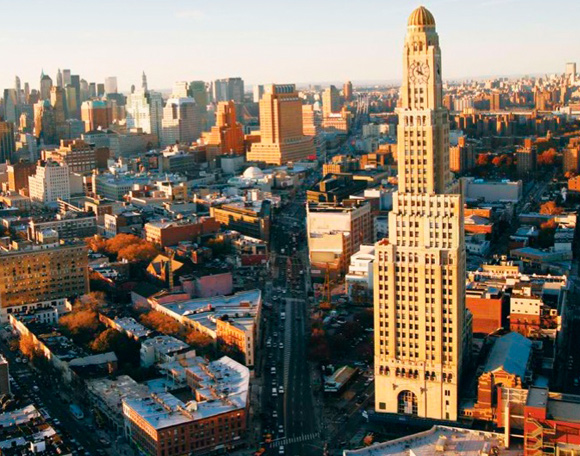
The Williamsburgh Savings Bank Tower

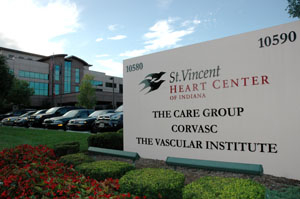
The St. Vincent Heart Center of Indiana

Healthcare real estate is a niche market within the larger real estate industry. Healthcare real estate, or "medical real estate", describes buildings, offices, and campuses leased to members or organizations within the healthcare community.

== In the United States ==
In the United States, Illinois, Texas, California, and Florida accounted for a third of healthcare construction in 2007, though the practice is also rising among other metropolitan areas. In 2014, 7.1 million square feet of medical office space was developed across the country.
