= Misrepresentation in Indian law =

A concept of English law that has been adopted in India, a misrepresentation is an untrue or misleading statement of fact made during negotiations by one party to another, which then induces that other party into the contract. The misled party may normally rescind the contract, and sometimes may be awarded damages as well (or instead of rescission).

== In India (under IPC section-90) ==
In India, the federal laws defines misrepresentation under "Misconception Of Fact". This is dealt with under the Indian Penal Code in Section 90, which states:

Consent given firstly under fear of injury, and secondly under a misconception of fact, is not consent at all.

That is what is explained in the first part of Section 90. There are two grounds specified in Section 90 which are analogous to coercion and mistake of fact which are the familiar grounds that can vitiate a transaction under the jurisprudence of India and other countries. The factors set out in first part of Section 90 are from the point of view of the victim; the second part of Section 90 enacts the corresponding provision from the point of view of the accused. It envisages that the accused has knowledge of - or reason to believe that - the consent was given by the victim in consequence of fear of injury or misconception of fact. Thus the second part lays emphasis on the knowledge or reasonable belief of the person who obtains the tainted consent. The requirements of both parts should be cumulatively satisfied. In other words, the Court has to determine whether the person giving the consent has done so under fear or misconception of fact; the court should also be satisfied that the person doing the act (i.e. the alleged offender) is conscious of the fact or should have reason to think that but for the fear or misconception, the consent would not have been given. This is the scheme of Section 90 which is couched in negative terminology.

== Vitiating factors ==
Misrepresentation is one of several vitiating factors that can affect the validity of a contract. Other vitiating factors include:

- Mistake
- Undue influence
- Duress in English law
- Duress in American law

== See also ==
- Misrepresentation
- Vitiating factors in the law of contract
- Tort of deceit
