= We do not rule based on categorical inferences in monetary cases =

Halakhic principle

"We do not rule based on categorical inferences in monetary cases" (Hebrew: אין הולכין בממון אחר הרוב; Aramaic: לא אזלינן בתר רובא בממונא) is a principle in halakha followed by Jewish batei din. According to this principle, a categorical inference is not sufficient evidence for the decisor to reallocate property. By "categorical inference" (רוב lit. majority) is meant "inference about the specific from evidence about its category." In the classic example, the decisor may not infer that a particular individual purchased an ox for the purpose of plowing with it, despite a stipulation that most purchasers share that purpose. The monetary exception emerges from conflict between the general principle of categorical inference, wherein doubt about specific data can be resolved by evidence for a stipulation about the wider category, and the contract-law principle of possession, wherein the burden of proof is on any claimant seeking reallocation of property.

The principle is the subject of a Talmudic dispute between Abba b. Aybo and Samuel of Nehardea. According to Abba b. Aybo, we rule based on categorical inferences in monetary cases; for practical purposes, the halakha follows Samuel of Nehardea, who takes the opposite view.

The remit of this exclusion is disputed, with some commentators and decisors arguing it is only in exceptional circumstances that the principle of categorical inference is not applied to monetary cases. The Tosafists state that the principle is followed in most monetary cases.

== Talmudic Sources ==
The classic source is the dispute between Abba b. Aybo and Samuel of Nehardea on Bava Batra 92b: (Note: See also: 46b)

If one sells an ox to his fellow and [the ox] is discovered to gore habitually:

- Abba b. Aybo says, "[The ox goring] is a vitiating circumstance."
- Samuel of Nehardea says, "[The vendor] may say to [the customer], 'I sold it to you for slaughter'."

[The nature of the dispute is:]

- Abba b. Aybo says, "[The ox goring] is a vitiating circumstance, because most purchase [oxen] for plowing and we make a categorical inference."
- Samuel of Nehardea says, "We make categorical inferences in ritual cases, but we do not in monetary cases."

Dotan Arad has argued that the original statements by Abba b. Aybo and Samuel of Nehardea do not conflict or relate to categorical inferences, and are only explained to conflict and relate by a later editor seeking to source the two positions on categorical inferences in monetary cases. A second example appears on Bava Kamma 27a:

Why does the mishnah call its subject a jug in one sentence, and then that same subject an amphora in another?

- Pappa says, "A jug is the same as an amphora for the purposes of contract law."

[His meaning is:]

- Even if these vessels are distinguished by most, we do not make a categorical inference about the purchaser, so if he requests one and receives the other he is not entitled to restitution.

This teaches us:

- We do not rule based on categorical inferences in monetary cases.

This principle is cited several further times in the Jerusalem Talmud, on Ketubot 9a and Bava Qamma 23b:

If a woman is widowed or divorced, and she claims she married her husband a virgin, but he or his heirs claim she married him already a widow if there are witnesses that she married him a virgin she is entitled to [the payout of a woman married as a virgin].

- Why should she have to prove she was married to a virgin? Most brides are virgins!
- This teaches: We do not rule based on categorical inferences in monetary cases.

If an ox gores a cow [to death] and her fetus is found [dead] beside her, the owner of the ox is liable for the death of the cow and half-liable for the death of the fetus.

- Do most cows miscarry? Infer that the goring caused the miscarriage!
- Abbahu of Caesaria says, "This teaches: We do not rule based on categorical inferences in monetary cases."

Aḥa says: "If a camel was in estrus among the camels, and one camel is found dead, [the owner of the camel in estrus] is held liable."

- Abin says, (Note: In the version on Bava Qamma 23b: Yose b. Zevida says,) "Only in this one monetary case do we rule based on categorical inferences."

These cases are also discussed in the Bavli, on b. Bava Batra 93a. In the Bavli, the Stam is uncertain whether any of these cases should be interpreted to imply the principle that categorical inferences may not be used on monetary cases.

== Rishonic understandings ==
Later commentators discuss two general difficulties with this principle. First, its apparent conflicts with another statement (Qiddushin 80a), "The Rabbis say: Between a categorical inference and a presumption, the categorical inference wins out." Second, argumentum a fortiori from capital cases, where categorical inferences are permitted. The Tosafists argue that neither parallel applies to cases where there is a conflict with the principle of possession, wherein the burden of proof is on any claimant seeking reallocation of property, and that it is these cases to which the Talmud refers as "monetary cases".

Samuel b. Meir and Israel Isserlein held that this principle is only applied to cases where the category is uncountable (רובא דליתיה קמן lit. majority which is not before us); in cases in which all examples of the category are available for inspection (רובא דאיתיה קמן lit. majority which is before us), and an exact percentage can be stipulated, inferences about the category may be used even for monetary rulings. Isserlein concedes that Mordechai b. Hillel and Isaac b. Samuel disagreed and did not permit inferences based on countable categories.
