= People v. Unger =

- Court: Supreme Court of Illinois
- Full case name: The People of the State of Illinois, Appellant, v. Francis Unger, Appellee.
- Decided: April 5, 1977
- Citations: 362 N.E. 2d 319; 66 Ill. 2d 333

Court membership
- Judges sitting: Robert C. Underwood, Daniel P. Ward, Howard C. Ryan, Joseph H. Goldenhersh, William G. Clark, James A. Dooley, Thomas J. Moran

Case opinions
- Decision by: Ryan
- Concurrence: Ward, Goldenhersh, Clark, Dooley, Moran
- Dissent: Underwood

Keywords
- Defense of necessity; Duress

People v. Unger, Supreme Court of Illinois, 362 N.E. 2d 319 (1977), is a criminal case that distinguished between necessity and duress. Unger escaped from prison under a claim of threat of physical and sexual violence, was recaptured, and was not allowed to use a defense of necessity or defense of duress at trial. The Supreme Court of Illinois held that the case should be analyzed under the necessity defense, as the defendant was not coerced by threats of physical violence to escape, but was allegedly forced to choose between the lesser of two evils, and chose to escape. The trial court's refusal to give instructions on the necessity defense to the jury was held to improper, as the defendant alleged circumstances and provided evidence that, if believed by a jury, could support a finding of necessity.
