= Se'if katan =

Se'if katan (Hebrew: סעיף קטן, Rashei teivot: ס"ק) is a term for a subsection in the halachic literature.

In the standard format for commentaries on halachic works, each se'if (section) of the original work is split into a number of separate se'ifim; such se'ifim are known as se'if katan.

One might reference the first se'if of commentary on siman 1 se'if 1 of a work by writing siman 1 se'if 1 se'if katan 1 (סימן א' סעיף א' ס"ק א). This format is used, for example, in the Mishnah Berurah (MB). Sometimes when quoting a halacha from such a work one might omit the se'if and only mention the siman and se'if katan, e.g. MB 1:1 (מ"ב סעי' א' ס"ק א).

The term se'if katan is also used to refer to subsections of Israeli legislation.
