= Duress in English law =

Common law defence

Duress in English law is a complete common law defence, operating in favour of those who commit crimes because they are forced or compelled to do so by the circumstances, or the threats of another. The doctrine arises not only in criminal law but also in civil law, where it is relevant to contract law and trusts law.

== Contract law ==
Duress involves illegitimate threats. The common law long allowed a claim if duress was of a physical nature. So long as a threat is just one of the reasons a person enters an agreement, even if not the main reason, the agreement may be avoided. In Barton v Armstrong Mr Armstrong tried to "strong-arm" Mr Barton into paying him a large golden parachute to exit a business by getting his goons to make death threats to Barton's family. Even though Barton was tough, and would have probably done the payout regardless, he could avoid the agreement.

Only late in the 20th century was escape allowed if the threat involved illegitimate economic harm. A threat is always "illegitimate" if it is to do an unlawful act, such as breaking a contract knowing non-payment may push someone out of business. However, threatening to do a lawful act will usually not be illegitimate. In Pao On v Lau Yiu Long, the Pao family threatened to not complete a share swap deal aimed at purchasing their company's building unless the Lau family agreed to change a guarantee agreement assuring the Paos would receive the rise in the swapped shares' prices when repurchased. The Privy Council advised that the Laus signing the guarantee agreement after the threat of non-completion of the main agreement was only a result of "commercial pressure", not economic duress. Just by observing the Laus' behaviour, and consideration of the situation before signing, there was no coercion amounting to a vitiation of consent. However, contrasting to cases involving business parties, the threat to do a lawful act will probably be duress if used against a vulnerable person.

An obvious case involving "lawful act duress" is blackmail. The blackmailer does not have to defend the lawful act they threaten (for example, revealing a secret), but they must defend the demand of money from a person highly vulnerable to them.

== Criminal law ==
This is an exception to the general principle of criminal law that those who choose to break the law are held responsible for the crimes that they commit. The rationale of the exception is that the choice is not wholly voluntary. The Law Commission (1977 at paras 2.44–2.46) recognised the logic that, if the defence was going to be allowed at all, it should be applied to all offences. But this recommendation has not been adopted because it is felt that, in the case of the most serious crimes such as murder, no threat to the defendant, however extreme, should excuse commission of the crime (Elliott; 1989). The defence is also open to abuse. Smith (1994 at p584) commented:

... duress is a unique defence in that it is so much more likely than any other to depend on assertions which are peculiarly difficult for the prosecution to investigate or subsequently to disprove.

This approach has been adopted by the judiciary, most notably by the House of Lords in R v H [2004] 2 WLR 335:

Defences that the accused has been set up and allegations of duress, which used to at one time to be rare, have multiplied. We wish to alert judges to the need to scrutinise applications for disclosure of details about informants with very great care.

The prosecution's difficulty was at one time the greater when the issue of duress had not been raised by the defence until the trial was under way. To counter these problems, the Law Commission (1993 at paras 33–34) recommended that the burden of proof be shifted to the defendant to establish duress on the balance of probabilities. Since then there has been no specific enactment relating to duress but Section 5 of the Criminal Procedure and Investigations Act 1996, c.25, provides that the defence must serve on the Court and the prosecution the nature of the accused's defence in general terms, and the matters in issue. This would seem to apply to the defence of duress, and in R v Tyrell and others, there had been a specific, although late, reliance upon the defence.

A rigorous analysis of the doctrine of duress is difficult because it is invariably reliant upon the particular facts in a given case, and there is usually an overlap between duress and the defence of necessity. See, for example, comments by Lord Woolf CJ in R v Shayler at para. 42.

=== History and reasoning ===
Duress as a defence has existed for many centuries and originates in common law—its extension to cover duress by circumstances did not occur until the 1990s, specifically the case of R v Pommell.

The defence of duress (by threat), according to Lord Bingham in R v Hasan, "excuses what would otherwise be criminal conduct" rather than justifies it. Bingham draws a distinction here with self-defence regarding between the moral status of the victim: in a case of self-defence, the victim has themselves made an aggressive or criminal act towards the defendant. In a duress case, there is no such relationship of prior aggression. Bingham notes at paragraph 19:

The victim of a crime committed under duress may be assumed to be morally innocent, having shown no hostility or aggression towards the defendant.

=== The threat ===
The law limits the nature of the threat that has to be placed on a person for them to qualify as being under duress. The threat must be one of death or serious personal injury, either to the defendant or to his immediate family or someone close to him. In R v Singh, the Court of Appeal held that a threat to expose the defendant's adultery would not be sufficient threat to overbear the will of an ordinary person.

The defendant must have a reasonable and genuinely held fear of death or serious harm, usually in the form of specific threats directed at the defendant, his immediate family or someone for whom he feels responsible. In R v Graham, the threat was immediately and directly made to the defendant. In the Australian case of R v Hurley & Murray escaped criminals compelled H to dispose of two corpses by holding his wife hostage, such that the threats to her "would have been operative during the entire period of his absence" and "his only concern must have been for the safety of the woman".

Following R v Conway and R v Wright, (where the threat related in part to the defendant's boyfriend) the specimen direction of the Judicial Studies Board suggests that the threat must be directed, if not to the defendant or a member of his immediate family, to a person for whose safety the defendant would reasonably regard himself as responsible which, if strictly applied, would be consistent with the rationale of the duress exception.

=== Causal link ===
As seen in R v Cole, there must be a direct causal link between these threats and the defendant's decision to break the law. Thus, the defendant's normal inhibitions must be overwhelmed by their belief in the efficacy of the threat. Following R v Safi it is held that the defendant need only prove he reasonably and genuinely believed there was a threat, i.e. the test is both subjective and objective in that the defendant's will must actually have been overwhelmed by the threat, and a reasonable person of average courage may also have felt compelled to act the same way under direction.

=== Immediacy ===
The circumstances in which the threats were made must also have offered no reasonable opportunity for evasive action. But, taken together, the questions of causation and immediacy have created a weakness in the limitations placed on the defence. In R v Hudson and Taylor, two young women who had witnessed a serious assault were intimidated and refused to identify the attacker in court. They were charged with perjury but allowed a conditional discharge. The court was prepared to allow leniency because these women lived in a community where physical retaliation for co-operating with the police was routine, and they had no reasonable means, given their age, experience, and lack of physical strength, of avoiding the implementation of the threat. This weakened the requirement that the threat's implementation must be so imminent that the defendant had to decide in that moment whether to break the law, and it has given rise to cases such as R v Cole in which a man robbed several building societies to avoid the threats of a debt collector. Simon Brown LJ. at p583 held that the peril relied on to support the plea of necessity lacked imminence, and the degree of directness and immediacy required of a sufficient nexus between the suggested peril and the offence charged. The one making the threats had not nominated the crimes to be committed by the defendant. He had simply indicated that he wanted the defendant to repay the debt which would not necessarily involve the commission of an offence.

=== The characteristics of the reasonable person ===
In R v Bowen, the Court of Appeal held person with a low IQ, short of mental impairment or mental defectiveness, was not necessarily less courageous or less able to withstand threats and pressure than an ordinary person. The relevant test (laid down in R v Graham) had two elements:

1. Was the defendant impelled to act as he did because he feared death or serious physical injury?
2. If so, did he respond as a sober person of reasonable firmness sharing the characteristics of the defendant would have done?

Stuart-Smith LJ gave comprehensive guidance as to which characteristics might be relevant in the jury's consideration: age, sex, physical disability or recognised mental illness might limit a person's ability to act in self-defence, but the fact that the defendant was more vulnerable, timid or susceptible to threats than a normal person were not characteristics of the reasonable person. Also excluded would be self-induced incapacity due to drunkenness or drug-taking (R v Flatt).

=== Duress by circumstances ===
There have been an increasing number of cases pleading duress arising from the general pressure of circumstances, whether arising directly from human action or not. To that extent, this subset of duress seeks to borrow some of the language of necessity. In R v Conway, the Court of Appeal dealt with a charge of reckless driving where the defendant had fled from police officers. His passenger had recently been attacked by a man with a shotgun, and screamed at the defendant to "drive off" when he saw the plain-clothed officers running toward the car. The court held that to establish "duress of circumstances", it was necessary for him to drive as he did believing it necessary to avoid death or serious bodily injury to himself or another person. As evidence, the accused must be able to point to an "objective danger" or at least satisfy the requirement of reasonable belief. As a gloss, Woolf LJ. noted that

Whether "duress of circumstances" is called "duress" or "necessity" does not matter. What is important is that, whatever it is called, it is subject to the same limitations as the "do this or else" species of duress.

In R v Martin the defendant who drove while disqualified claimed that it was necessary for him to drive his son to work, because he feared that his mentally ill wife might commit suicide if her son did not arrive at work on time. Simon Brown J. defined the defence as pressure on the accused's will arising either from the wrongful threats or violence of another, or from other objective dangers threatening the accused or others. The requirements were that

1. "from an objective standpoint, the accused can be said to be acting reasonably and proportionately in order to avoid a threat of death or serious injury";
2. a jury should determine whether the accused was "impelled to act as he did because of a result of what he reasonably believed to be the situation, he had good cause to fear ... death or serious physical injury"; and
3. a jury should also determine whether "a sober person of reasonable firmness, sharing the characteristics of the accused, [would] have responded to that situation" in the same manner.

Thus, in DPP v Bell the accused successfully pleaded duress of circumstances to driving with excess alcohol because, following an incident in a pub which caused him to fear for his physical safety, he escaped in his car, only driving a short distance to safety and then abandoning the criminal activity as soon as reasonably possible. While in R v Baker and Wilkins a child's mother and another broke down the door to the father's house to recover the child from his possession. The action was being taken to defend the child so three defences were raised:

- s5(2)(b) Criminal Damage Act 1971 which allows a reasonable excuse as a defence to the damage of property. It was held that a child is not property capable of being defended for the purposes of the section.
- self-defence which includes the defence of others both inherently and through the use of reasonable force to prevent the commission of a crime under s3 Criminal Law Act 1967.
- duress of circumstances. The court held that duress did not include threats or the fear of long-term psychological injury even though that might be serious psychological injury. Since there were other lawful remedies other than immediate self-help, duress was denied.

The danger must be such that the accused cannot reasonably, taking into account any of their relevant characteristics, be expected to act otherwise. In cases where a facilitation payment needs to be made "to protect against loss of life, limb or liberty", official guidance on the Bribery Act 2010 states that a duress defence is "very likely to be available". In R v Pommell the defendant was charged with possession of an illegal firearm, a sub-machine gun, which he claimed to have taken from another person in order to prevent that other from using it and to hand it to the police. There was some doubt as to how long the weapon had been in his possession, which resulted in his conviction because the jury decided that he had not acted as soon as was reasonable in the circumstances. R v Abdul Hussain and others considered the requirement that the threat be imminent and operative even though its execution is not immediate. The defendants hijacked a plane in order to escape death at the hands of the Iraqi authorities. The court held that the defence was available as long as the crime was a reasonable and proportionate response to an imminent peril of death or serious injury. The threat need not be immediate, only imminent.

=== Gang membership ===
The most recent cases have involved situations where the defendant

1. failed to escape from the threats when they could have done so, and/or
2. put themself in a position in which they were likely to be subjected to threats.

In R v Hasan the defendant was the driver for a group that organised prostitution and had connections with a second organisation of violent drug dealers. He was charged with burglary in circumstances where he and his family had been threatened, and he had been accompanied to the scene of the crime by an armed man. In the earlier case of R v Fitzpatrick, involving the IRA, Lowry LCJ, said at p 33:

A person may become associated with a sinister group of men with criminal objectives and coercive methods of ensuring that their lawless enterprises are carried out and thereby voluntarily expose himself to illegal compulsion, whether or not the group is or becomes a proscribed organisation ... if a person voluntarily exposes and submits himself, as the appellant did, to illegal compulsion, he cannot rely on the duress to which he has voluntarily exposed himself as an excuse either in respect of the crimes he commits against his will or in respect of his continued but unwilling association with those capable of exercising upon him the duress which he calls in aid.

In cases involving less serious criminality, R v Sharp involved a gang of robbers, while R v Shepherd involved a group of shoplifters, the court held:

... but in my judgment the defence of duress is not available to an accused who voluntarily exposes and submits himself to illegal compulsion. It is not merely a matter of joining in a criminal enterprise; it is a matter of joining in a criminal enterprise of such a nature that the defendant appreciated the nature of the enterprise itself and the attitudes of those in charge of it, so that when he was in fact subjected to compulsion he could fairly be said by a jury to have voluntarily exposed himself and submitted himself to such compulsion.

Thus, if the defendant knows what the group does and that some violent people are involved, they cannot rely on the violence threatened as duress. But in R v Baker and Ward this was slightly modified at p344: "What a defendant has to be aware of is the risk that the group might try to coerce him into committing criminal offences of the type for which he is being tried by the use of violence or threats of violence." (On whether this is a subjective or objective test, see Ashworth: 2003.) The Lords in Hasan clearly stated at para 37:

Nothing should turn on foresight of the manner in which, in the event, the dominant party chooses to exploit the defendant's subservience. There need not be foresight of coercion to commit crimes, although it is not easy to envisage circumstances in which a party might be coerced to act lawfully. In holding that there must be foresight of coercion to commit crimes of the kind with which the defendant is charged, R v Baker and Ward mis-stated the law.

=== Exceptions ===
Duress is no defence to murder, attempted murder, or, seemingly, treason involving the death of the sovereign. In general, courts do not accept a defence of duress when harm done by the defendant is greater than the court's perception of the harm threatened. This is a test of proportionality. In Howe the court held that the jury should consider:

1. Whether the defendant acted as he did because he honestly believed that his life was in immediate danger (a subjective test)
2. Would a reasonable person of ordinary courage sharing the defendant's characteristics have responded in the same way to the threats? (an objective test)

Howe was a member of a gang that tortured and strangled a man. On a second occasion, Howe strangled the victim. He claimed to have acted out of fear for one Murray who, through threatened and actual violence, had gained control of the group. Previously, in Director of Public Prosecutions for Northern Ireland v Lynch, the Lords had held by a majority that duress was available to an accomplice. On this occasion, the Lords held that one of the relevant public policies underpinning the criminal law must be to protect innocent lives and to set a standard of behaviour which ordinary people are expected to observe if they are to avoid criminal responsibility. In cases where the choice is between the threat of death or serious injury and deliberately taking an innocent life, a reasonable person might reflect that one innocent human life is at least as valuable as their own or that of their loved one. In such a case a person cannot claim that they are choosing the lesser of two evils. Rather they are adopting the understandable but morally dubious principle that the end justifies the means. Similarly, R v Gotts held that duress is not a defence to attempted murder.

=== Mental health ===
The courts have held that the duress must come from an extraneous source, rather than internal thought processes. The case of R v Rodger & Rose involved two prison inmates who had escaped. They sought to utilise the defence of duress of circumstances on the grounds that they were compelled to escape after becoming depressed whilst in prison, and fearing that unless they escaped they would become suicidal. The court decided that as a matter of public policy, the source of the duress must be from an external source and not from the internal thought processes associated with mental illness.

This decision may well have been reached to prevent such an absurdity from passing into law however as in Shayler. In Shayler, Lord Woolf remarked obiter that the defence should be extended to include acts designed to protect a person's mental, as well as physical health, from serious injury.

== See also ==
- Vitiating factors in the law of contract
- Marital coercion
