= Necessity and duress =

Necessity and duress (compulsion) are different defenses in a criminal case. The defense of duress applies when another person threatens imminent harm if defendant did not act to commit the crime. The defense of necessity applies when defendant is forced by natural circumstances to choose between two evils, and the criminal act is the lesser evil.

== By legal tradition ==
=== United States ===
In jurisprudence, duress or coercion refers to a situation whereby a person performs an act as a result of violence, threat, or other pressure against the person. Black's Law Dictionary (6th ed.) defines duress as "any unlawful threat or coercion used... to induce another to act [or not act] in a manner [they] otherwise would not [or would]". Duress is pressure exerted upon a person to coerce that person to perform an act they ordinarily would not perform. The notion of duress must be distinguished both from undue influence in the civil law. In criminal law, duress and necessity are different defenses.

Duress has two aspects. One is that it negates the person's consent to an act, such as sexual activity or the entering into a contract; or, secondly, as a possible legal defense or justification to an otherwise unlawful act. Defendants utilizing the duress defense admit to breaking the law but claim that they are not liable because, even though the act broke the law, it was only performed because of extreme, unlawful pressure. In criminal law, a duress defense is similar to a plea of guilty, admitting partial culpability, so that if the defense is not accepted then the criminal act is admitted.

Duress or coercion can also be raised in an allegation of rape or other sexual assault to negate a defense of consent on the part of the person making the allegation.

=== United Kingdom ===
Duress in English law is a complete common law defence, operating in favour of those who commit crimes because they are forced or compelled to do so by the circumstances, or the threats of another. The doctrine arises not only in criminal law but also in civil law, where it is relevant to contract law and trusts law.

=== Saudi Arabia ===
Saudi law regards contracts entered into without willing consent to be invalid, regarding both coercion and economic duress as causes for invalidity.

=== Jewish law ===
Jewish law does not accept duress a defense for the crime of murder, as the Talmud states (on Pesachim 25b, Yoma 82b, and Sanhedrin 74a):

Someone came before Rava (Note: Many MSS read Rabbah.) and said, "The governor of the city ordered me to slay a certain man, and threatened to kill me if I did not". Rava said to him, "Rather than slay another person, you must permit yourself to be slain, for how do you know that your blood is redder than his; perhaps his blood is redder than yours?"
