= Vitiating factors in the law of contract =

In English law, a vitiating factor in the common law of contract is a factor that can affect the validity of a contract. The concept has been adopted in other common law jurisdictions, including the USA.

A vitiating factor is one which spoils the contract, rendering it imperfect. The standard remedy is rescission, but damages may also be available. (By contrast, the standard remedy for breach of contract is damages, with repudiation available for serious breach only).

== See also ==
- Good faith
- US contract law
- Duress in American law
- German contract law
- French contract law
- Principles of European Contract Law Arts 4:107, 4:116 and 4:117
- Misleading or deceptive conduct
- Tort of deceit
