= Duress in American law =

In jurisprudence, duress or coercion refers to a situation whereby a person performs an act as a result of violence, threat, or other pressure against the person. Black's Law Dictionary (6th ed.) defines duress as "any unlawful threat or coercion used ... to induce another to act [or not act] in a manner [they] otherwise would not [or would]". Duress is pressure exerted upon a person to coerce that person to perform an act they ordinarily would not perform. The notion of duress must be distinguished from undue influence in civil law. In criminal law, duress and necessity are different defenses.

Duress has two aspects. One is that it negates the person's consent to an act, such as sexual activity or the entering into a contract; or, secondly, as a possible legal defense or justification to an otherwise unlawful act. Defendants utilizing the duress defense admit to breaking the law but claim that they are not liable because, even though the act broke the law, it was only performed because of extreme, unlawful pressure. In criminal law, a duress defense is similar to a plea of guilty, admitting partial culpability, so that if the defense is not accepted then the criminal act is admitted.

Duress or coercion can also be raised in an allegation of rape or other sexual assault to negate a defense of consent on the part of the person making the allegation.

== Discussion ==
A defendant who raises a defense of duress has actually done everything to constitute the actus reus of the crime, and has the mens rea because they intended to do it to avoid some threatened or actual harm. Thus, some degree of culpability already attaches to the defendant for what was done.

In criminal law, the defendant's motive for breaking the law is generally irrelevant unless a defendant is raising an affirmative defense allowed for by law. (Duress may or may not be allowed as an affirmative defense for some particular charge – in particular, it is generally forbidden for murder, and many jurisdictions also forbid it for sexual assault. Malum in se offenses, generally, are less likely to recognize duress as a defense than malum prohibitum offenses.)

A successful affirmative defense means not that a criminal act was justified, but that the act was not criminal at all. But if no affirmative defense of duress is available, then the duress may be considered as justifying a lighter sentence, typically in proportion to the degree of duress. If the duress is extreme enough, for example, the defendant might be found guilty of murder but given a minimal, or even trivial, sentence.

In some rare cases, a successful argument of duress – even when not an affirmative defense – might result in the jury nullifying the charge by refusing to convict.

The basis of the defense is that the duress actually overwhelmed the defendant's will and would also have overwhelmed the will of a person of ordinary courage (a hybrid test requiring both subjective evidence of the accused's state of mind, and an objective confirmation that the failure to resist the threats was reasonable), thus rendering the entire behavior involuntary. Thus, the liability should be reduced or discharged, making the defense one of exculpation.

The extent to which this defense should be allowed, if at all, is a matter of public policy. A state may say that no threat should force a person to deliberately break the law, particularly if this breach will cause significant loss or damage to a third person. Alternatively, a state may take the view that even though people may have ordinary levels of courage, they may nevertheless be coerced into agreeing to break the law and this human weakness should have some recognition in the law.

A mutant of duress involves hostage taking, where a person is forced to commit a criminal act under the threat, say, that their family member or close associate will be immediately killed should they refuse (commonly known as a Tiger kidnapping). This has been raised in some cases of ransom, where a person commits theft or embezzlement under orders from a kidnapper in order to secure a family member's life and freedom. However, duress is not a complete defense to all crimes. For example, the general rule, both at common law and today, is that duress is never a defense to murder; that is, one is never justified in killing another innocent person even if one's own life has been threatened, although this part may be questioned when multiple people are threatened with death if the defendant does not kill a single or fewer people than threatened (such a situation is similar to the trolley problem). A counterpart may be found in an English law, where in R v Dudley and Stephens involved a case of one man being killed to save two lives - no duress defense was available and they were convicted.

== Requirements ==
For duress to qualify as a defense, four requirements must be met:

- The threat must be of serious bodily harm or death
- The threatened harm must be greater than the harm caused by the crime
- The threat must be immediate and inescapable
- The defendant must have become involved in the situation through no fault of their own

A person may also raise a duress defense when force or violence is used to compel them to enter into a contract, or to discharge.

== In contract law ==
Duress in the context of contract law is a common law defense brought about when one of the parties to the contract enjoyed an ascendant position in relation to the other party and abused that position by subjecting the other to threats. A party who has entered into a contract under duress is entitled to rescind or set aside the contract, rendering it voidable (in equity).

Duress is a threat of harm made to compel someone to do something against their will or judgment; especially a wrongful threat made by one person to compel a manifestation of seeming assent by another person to a transaction without real volition. - Black's Law Dictionary (8th ed. 2004)

Duress in contract law falls into two broad categories:

- Physical duress
- Economic duress

=== Physical duress ===
==== Duress to the person ====
Ronald Griffin of Florida A&M University College of Law puts physical duress simply: "Your money or your life." In Barton v Armstrong, a decision of the Privy Council, Armstrong (defendant) sought to coerce Barton (plaintiff) into executing a deed relating to the sale of certain companies by threatening to have him murdered. While the plaintiff took the threats seriously, other business reasons existed for signing the contract. An innocent party wishing to set aside a contract for duress to the person need only prove that the threat was made and that it was a reason for entry into the contract. Furthermore, once it is established that the threat was made, the onus lies on the person who made the threat to prove that the threat made no contribution to the plaintiff's decision to enter the agreement.

Common law took a narrow view of the concept of duress in that it was concerned with actual or threatened violence to the person or unlawful imprisonment. Equity, however, adopted a broader "fusion" view of what sort of pressure could constitute coercion for purposes of relief and has since prevailed.

==== Duress to goods ====
In such cases, one party refuses to release the goods belonging to the other party until the other party enters into a contract with them. For example, in Hawker Pacific Pty Ltd v Helicopter Charter Pty Ltd (1991) 22 NSWLR 298, the contract was set aside after Hawker Pacific's threats to withhold the helicopter from the plaintiff unless further payments were made for repairing a botched paint job.

=== Elements of economic duress ===
Economic duress is the use of unlawful economic pressure to compel a party to a contract to agree to demands which they would not have otherwise.

- Wrongful or improper threat. No precise definition of what is wrongful or improper. Examples include: morally wrong, criminal, or tortious conduct; one that is a threat to breach a contract "in bad faith" or threaten to withhold an admitted debt "in bad faith".
- No reasonable alternative (but to accept the other party's terms). If there is an available legal remedy, an available market substitute (in the form of funds, goods, or services), or any other sources of funds this element is not met.
- The threat actually induces the making of the contract. This is a subjective standard, and takes into account the victim's age, their background (especially their education), relationship of the parties, and the ability to receive advice.
- The other party caused the financial distress. The majority opinion is that the other party must have caused the distress, while the minority opinion allows them to merely take advantage of the distress.

== Insane duress ==
In criminal law, when a person is found legally insane because they believed God ordered them to do the crime ("deific-decree"), one interpretation of the insanity is that they acted under a delusion of duress by God.

== See also ==
- Criminal law of the United States
- English contract law
- English criminal law
- Self-sacrifice in Halacha (Jewish law)
- United States contract law
