= List of statutory instruments of the United Kingdom, 1999 (1–1700) =

This is an incomplete list of statutory instruments of the United Kingdom in 1999 (1–1700.

== 1–100 ==
- The School Standards and Framework Act 1998 (School Playing Fields) (Modification) (England) Regulations 1999 (S.I. 1999 No. 1)
- The Education (School Premises) Regulations 1999 (S.I. 1999 No. 2)
- The Social Security (Categorisation of Earners) Amendment Regulations 1999 (S.I. 1999 No. 3)
- The Medicines (Standard Provisions for Licences and Certificates) Amendment Regulations 1999 (S.I. 1999 No. 4)
- The Knives Act 1997 (Commencement) (No. 2) Order 1999 (S.I. 1999 No. 5 (C.1))
- The Rent Acts (Maximum Fair Rent) Order 1999 (S.I. 1999 No. 6)
- The Arable Area Payments (Amendment) Regulations 1999 (S.I. 1999 No. 8)
- The Curfew Condition (Responsible Officer) Order 1999 (S.I. 1999 No. 9)
- The Curfew Order (Responsible Officer)(Amendment) Order 1999 (S.I. 1999 No. 10)
- The Medway National Health Service Trust (Establishment) Amendment Order 1999 (S.I. 1999 No. 11)
- The A40 Trunk Road (Ealing) Red Route (Clearway) Traffic Order 1995 Variation Order 1999 (S.I. 1999 No. 12)
- The A40 Trunk Road (Ealing) Red Route Traffic Order 1995 Variation Order 1999 (S.I. 1999 No. 13)
- The Education (Infant Class Sizes) (Grant) Regulations 1999 (S.I. 1999 No. 14)
- The A205 Trunk Road (Southwark) Red Route (Bus Lanes) Traffic Order 1999 (S.I. 1999 No. 15)
- The Cambuslang College (Change of Name) (Scotland) Order 1999 (S.I. 1999 No. 16 (S. 1))
- The Merchant Shipping (Pilot Transfer Arrangements) Regulations 1999 (S.I. 1999 No. 17)
- The Vehicle Excise Duty (Immobilisation, Removal and Disposal of Vehicles) (Amendment) Regulations 1999 (S.I. 1999 No. 35)
- The Health and Safety at Work etc. Act 1974 (Application to Environmentally Hazardous Substances) (Amendment) Regulations 1999 (S.I. 1999 No. 40)
- The Portsmouth Harbour (Gunwharf Quays) Order 1999 (S.I. 1999 No. 50)
- The Warrington Hospital National Health Service Trust (Establishment) Amendment Order 1999 (S.I. 1999 No. 58)
- The Durham County Priority Services National Health Service Trust (Change of Name) Order 1999 (S.I. 1999 No. 60)
- The Government of Wales Act 1998 (Housing) (Amendments) Order 1999 (S.I. 1999 No. 61)
- The Sandwell Healthcare National Health Service Trust(Establishment) Amendment Order 1999 (S.I. 1999 No. 62)
- The Export of Goods (Control) (Amendment) Order 1999 (S.I. 1999 No. 63)
- The European Communities (Recognition of Professional Qualifications) (Second General System) (Amendment) Regulations 1999 (S.I. 1999 No. 67)
- The Housing Renewal Grants (Common Parts) Order 1999 (S.I. 1999 No. 68)
- The General Optical Council (Registration and Enrolment (Amendment) Rules)—Order of Council 1999 (S.I. 1999 No. 69)
- The Income Tax (Employments) (Amendment) Regulations 1999 (S.I. 1999 No. 70)
- The Allocation of Housing and Homelessness (Review Procedures) Regulations 1999 (S.I. 1999 No. 71)
- Motor Vehicles (Driving Licences) (Amendment) Regulations 1999 (S.I. 1999 No. 72)
- The Charities (Seamen's Hospital Society) Order 1999 (S.I. 1999 No. 73)
- The Sea Fish (Specified Sea Area) (Regulation of Nets and Prohibition of Fishing Methods) (Variation) Order 1999 (S.I. 1999 No. 74)
- The Bass (Specified Areas) (Prohibition of Fishing) (Variation) Order 1999 (S.I. 1999 No. 75)
- The Building Regulations (Amendment) Regulations 1999 (S.I. 1999 No. 77)
- Act of Adjournal (Criminal Procedure Rules) (Amendment) 1999 (S.I. 1999 No. 78 (S.2))
- The Grants for Pre-school Education (Prescribed Children) (Scotland) Amendment Order 1999 (S.I. 1999 No. 79 (S.3))
- The Food Protection (Emergency Prohibitions) (Radioactivity in Sheep) Partial Revocation Order 1999 (S.I. 1999 No. 80)
- The A205 Trunk Road (Lewisham) Red Route Traffic Order 1999 (S.I. 1999 No. 81)

== 101–200 ==
- The Financing of Maintained Schools Regulations 1999 (S.I. 1999 No. 101)
- The Local Government Act 1988 (Defined Activities) (Exemption) (Enfield London Borough Council) Order 1999 (S.I. 1999 No. 102)
- The Orkney Islands (Electoral Arrangements) Order 1999 (S.I. 1999 No. 103 (S.4))
- The Shetland Islands (Electoral Arrangements) Order 1999 (S.I. 1999 No. 104 (S.5))
- The Channel Tunnel Rail Link (Assessment of Environmental Effects) Regulations 1999 (S.I. 1999 No. 107)
- The Government of Wales Act 1998 (Commencement No. 3) Order 1999 (S.I. 1999 No. 118 (C.2))
- The School Standards and Framework Act 1998 (Commencement No. 5 and Saving and Transitional Provisions) Order 1999 (S.I. 1999 No. 120 (C.3))
- The Broadcasting (Restrictions on the Holding of Licences) (Amendment) Order 1999 (S.I. 1999 No. 122)
- The Income Support (General) (Standard Interest Rate Amendment) Regulations 1999 (S.I. 1999 No. 123)
- The Education (Relevant Areas for Consultation on Admission Arrangements) Regulations 1999 (S.I. 1999 No. 124)
- The Education (Objections to Admission Arrangements) Regulations 1999 (S.I. 1999 No. 125)
- The Education (Determination of Admission Arrangements) Regulations 1999 (S.I. 1999 No. 126)
- The Education (School Information) (Wales) (Amendment) Regulations 1999 (S.I. 1999 No. 127)
- The Land Registration Rules 1999 (S.I. 1999 No. 128)
- The School Standards and Framework Act 1998 (School Attendance Targets) (Modification) Regulations 1999 (S.I. 1999 No. 129)
- The Road Traffic (Permitted Parking Area and Special Parking Area) (County of Kent) (Borough of Maidstone) (Amendment) Order 1999 (S.I. 1999 No. 130)
- The Road Traffic (Permitted Parking Area and Special Parking Area) (City of Manchester) Order 1999 (S.I. 1999 No. 131)
- The Road Traffic (Permitted Parking Area and Special Parking Area) (County of Hampshire) (City of Winchester) (Amendment) Order 1999 (S.I. 1999 No. 132)
- The National Lottery (Imposition of Penalties and Revocation of Licences) Procedure Regulations 1999 (S.I. 1999 No. 137)
- The Education Development Plans (England) Regulations 1999 (S.I. 1999 No. 138)
- The A205 Trunk Road (Southwark) Red Route (Prohibited Turns) Traffic Order 1999 (S.I. 1999 No. 142)
- The A1 Trunk Road (Haringey) Red Route Traffic Order 1993 Variation Order 1999 (S.I. 1999 No. 143)
- The Restriction of Liberty Order (Scotland) Amendment Regulations 1999 (S.I. 1999 No. 144 (S. 6))
- The Police Act 1997 (Commencement No. 6) Order 1999 (S.I. 1999 No. 151 (C.4))
- The Magistrates' Courts Committees (West Yorkshire) Amalgamation (Amendment) Order 1999 (S.I. 1999 No. 152)
- The Tameside (Parishes) Order 1999 (S.I. 1999 No. 156)
- The Miscellaneous Products of Animal Origin (Import Conditions) Regulations 1999 (S.I. 1999 No. 157)
- The Industrial Training Levy (Engineering Construction Board) Order 1999 (S.I. 1999 No. 158)
- The Industrial Training Levy (Construction Board) Order 1999 (S.I. 1999 No. 159)
- The Petroleum (Current Model Clauses) Order 1999 (S.I. 1999 No. 160)
- The Petroleum Act 1998 (Commencement No. 1) Order 1999 (S.I. 1999 No. 161 (C. 5))
- The Road Traffic Offenders (Prescribed Devices) Order 1999 (S.I. 1999 No. 162)
- The Midland Metro (Penalty Fares) (Activating) Order 1999 (S.I. 1999 No. 163)
- The Housing Revenue Account General Fund Contribution Limits (Scotland) Order 1999 (S.I. 1999 No. 164 (S.7))
- The Legal Aid (Prescribed Panels) Regulations 1999 (S.I. 1999 No. 166)
- The M4 Motorway (Hillingdon and Hounslow) (Speed Limits) (Amendment) Regulations 1999 (S.I. 1999 No. 167)
- The Protection of Wrecks (Designation) Order 1999 (S.I. 1999 No. 186 (S.8))
- Act of Sederunt (Rules of the Court of Session Amendment) (Witnesses' Fees) 1999 (S.I. 1999 No. 187 (S.9))
- Act of Sederunt (Fees of Witnesses in the Sheriff Court) (Amendment) 1999 (S.I. 1999 No. 188 (S.10))
- The Guaranteed Minimum Pensions Increase Order 1999 (S.I. 1999 No. 192)
- The Chemicals (Hazard Information and Packaging for Supply) (Amendment) Regulations 1999 (S.I. 1999 No. 197)
- The Child Benefit (Residence and Persons Abroad) Amendment Regulations 1999 (S.I. 1999 No. 198)
- The Mid-Sussex National Health Service Trust (Establishment) Amendment Order 1999 (S.I. 1999 No. 199)

== 201–300 ==
- The Advice and Assistance (Assistance by Way of Representation) (Scotland) Amendment Regulations 1999 (S.I. 1999 No. 214 (S. 11))
- The Criminal Legal Aid (Scotland) (Prescribed Proceedings) Amendment Regulations 1999 (S.I. 1999 No. 215 (S. 12))
- The Civil Courts (Amendment) Order 1999 (S.I. 1999 No. 216)
- The Greater Manchester (Light Rapid Transit System) (Airport Extension Order 1997) (Moor Road Modification) Order 1999 (S.I. 1999 No. 217)
- The York Sixth Form College (Dissolution) Order 1999 (S.I. 1999 No. 218)
- The Local Government Act 1988 (Defined Activities) (Exemptions) (Broxtowe Borough Council, South Somerset District Council and Thurrock Borough Council) Order 1999 (S.I. 1999 No. 219)
- The National Institute for Clinical Excellence (Establishment and Constitution) Order 1999 (S.I. 1999 No. 220)
- The Water (Compulsory Works Powers) (Notice) Regulations 1999 (S.I. 1999 No. 221)
- The Local Authorities (Alteration of Requisite Calculations) (England) Regulations 1999 (S.I. 1999 No. 228)
- The Local Education Authority (Post-Compulsory Education Awards) Regulations 1999 (S.I. 1999 No. 229)
- The Fishguard to Bangor Trunk Road (A487) (Llanwnda to South of Llanllyfni Improvement) Order 1999 (S.I. 1999 No. 230)
- The A4 Trunk Road (Bath Road and Sipson Way, Hillingdon) (Prohibition of Traffic Movements) Order 1999 (S.I. 1999 No. 232)
- The A4 Trunk Road (Bath Road, Hillingdon) (Bus Lane) Order 1999 (S.I. 1999 No. 233)
- The A4 Trunk Road (Bath Road and Sipson Road, Hillingdon) (Prohibition of Turns) Order 1999 (S.I. 1999 No. 234)
- The A4 Trunk Road (Bath Road and North Hatton Road, Hillingdon) (Left Turn Lane) Order 1999 (S.I. 1999 No. 235)
- The Building Societies (Contents of Accounts) Regulations 1999 (S.I. 1999 No. 248)
- The Education (School Information) (England) (Amendment) Regulations 1999 (S.I. 1999 No. 251)
- The Education (Grants for Education Support and Training) (England) Regulations 1998 (Amendment) Regulations 1999 (S.I. 1999 No. 252)
- The Non-Domestic Rate (Scotland) Order 1999 (S.I. 1999 No. 254 (S. 13))
- The Transport of Dangerous Goods (Safety Advisers) Regulations 1999 (S.I. 1999 No. 257)
- The Education (Aptitude for Particular Subjects) Regulations 1999 (S.I. 1999 No. 258)
- The Local Government Changes for England (Council Tax) (Transitional Reduction) Regulations 1999 (S.I. 1999 No. 259)
- The National Institute for Clinical Excellence Regulations 1999 (S.I. 1999 No. 260)
- The National Health Service (Fund-holding Practices) Amendment Regulations 1999 (S.I. 1999 No. 261)
- The Personal Injuries (Civilians) Amendment Scheme 1999 (S.I. 1999 No. 262)
- The Social Security (Contributions) (Re-rating and National Insurance Fund Payments) Order 1999 (S.I. 1999 No. 263)
- The Social Security Benefits Up-rating Order 1999 (S.I. 1999 No. 264)
- The Education (Registered Inspectors of Schools Appeal Tribunal and Registered Nursery Education Inspectors Appeal Tribunal) (Procedure) Regulations 1999 (S.I. 1999 No. 265)
- The Langstone Harbour Revision Order 1999 (S.I. 1999 No. 266)
- The Medicines (Advertising and Monitoring of Advertising) Amendment Regulations 1999 (S.I. 1999 No. 267)
- The European Economic Interest Grouping (Fees) Regulations 1999 (S.I. 1999 No. 268)
- The Police (Retention and Disposal of Items seized under section 60 of the Criminal Justice and Public Order Act 1994) Regulations 1999 (S.I. 1999 No. 269)
- The Scottish Parliament (Regional Returning Officers) (Scotland) Order 1999 (S.I. 1999 No. 270 (S. 14))
- The Civil Aviation (Canadian Navigation Services) (Amendment) Regulations 1999 (S.I. 1999 No. 271)
- The Trunk Roads (Red Route) Traffic Orders (General Variation) Order 1999 (S.I. 1999 No. 272)
- The A1 Trunk Road (Islington) Red Route Traffic Order 1993 Variation Order 1999 (S.I. 1999 No. 273)
- The Education Act 1996 (Special Purpose and Capital Grants) (Modification) Regulations 1999 (S.I. 1999 No. 274)
- The Processed Cereal-based Foods and Baby Foods for Infants and Young Children (Amendment) Regulations 1999 (S.I. 1999 No. 275)
- The Non-Domestic Rates (Levying) (Scotland) Regulations 1999 (S.I. 1999 No. 276 (S. 15))
- The Parliamentary Commissioner Order 1999 (S.I. 1999 No. 277)
- The European Communities (Immunities and Privileges of the North-East Atlantic Fisheries Commission) Order 1999 (S.I. 1999 No. 278)
- The European Communities (Definition of Treaties) (North-East Atlantic Fisheries Commission) Order 1999 (S.I. 1999 No. 279)
- The Federal Republic of Yugoslavia (United Nations Sanctions) (Amendment) Order 1999 (S.I. 1999 No. 280)
- The Federal Republic of Yugoslavia (United Nations Sanctions) (Dependent Territories) (Amendment) Order 1999 (S.I. 1999 No. 281)
- The Criminal Justice Act 1988 (Designated Countries and Territories) (Amendment) Order 1999 (S.I. 1999 No. 282)
- The Departments (Northern Ireland) Order 1999 (S.I. 1999 No. 283 (N.I. 1))
- The Federal Republic of Yugoslavia (United Nations Sanctions) (Channel Islands) (Amendment) Order 1999 (S.I. 1999 No. 284)
- The Federal Republic of Yugoslavia (United Nations Sanctions) (Isle of Man) (Amendment) Order 1999 (S.I. 1999 No. 285)
- The Employer's Contributions Re-imbursement Amendment Regulations 1999 (S.I. 1999 No. 286)
- The Confirmation to Small Estates (Scotland) Order 1999 (S.I. 1999 No. 290 (S. 16))
- The Police and Criminal Evidence Act 1984 (Codes of Practice No. 5) Order 1999 (S.I. 1999 No. 291)
- The Housing (Right to Buy) (Limits on Discount) (Wales) Order 1999 (S.I. 1999 No. 292)
- The Town and Country Planning (Environmental Impact Assessment) (England and Wales) Regulations 1999 (S.I. 1999 No. 293)
- The Naval, Military and Air Forces Etc. (Disablement and Death) Service Pensions Amendment Order 1999 (S.I. 1999 No. 294)
- The Local Authorities (Alteration of Requisite Calculations) (Wales) Regulations 1999 (S.I. 1999 No. 296)
- The Local Authorities (Requisite Calculations) (Wales) (Prescribed Amounts) Regulations 1999 (S.I. 1999 No. 297)

== 301–400 ==
- The Carriage of Dangerous Goods (Amendment) Regulations 1999 (S.I. 1999 No. 303)
- The Local Government Act 1988 (Defined Activities) (Exemption) (Stoke-on-Trent City Council) Order 1999 (S.I. 1999 No. 315)
- The National Health Service (General Medical Services) Amendment Regulations 1999 (S.I. 1999 No. 326)
- The Town and Country Planning (Costs of Inquiries etc.) (Standard Daily Amount) Regulations 1999 (S.I. 1999 No. 327)
- The Export of Goods (Control) (Amendment No. 2) Order 1999 (S.I. 1999 No. 335)
- The Merchant Shipping (Carriage of Cargoes) Regulations 1999 (S.I. 1999 No. 336)
- The Self-Governing Schools (Publication of Proposals for Discontinuance) (Scotland) Regulations 1999 (S.I. 1999 No. 337 (S.17))
- The Northern Ireland Act 1998 (Commencement No. 1) Order 1999 (S.I. 1999 No. 340 (C. 6))
- The Social Security Benefits Up-rating (No. 2) Order 1999 (S.I. 1999 No. 341)
- The A20 Trunk Road (Greenwich) Red Route Traffic Order 1996 Variation Order 1999 (S.I. 1999 No. 342)
- The A102 Trunk Road (Greenwich) Red Route (Clearway) Traffic Order 1999 (S.I. 1999 No. 343)
- The Apportionment of Money in the National Lottery Distribution Fund Order 1999 (S.I. 1999 No. 344)
- The Legal Aid in Criminal and Care Proceedings (Costs) (Amendment) Regulations 1999 (S.I. 1999 No. 345)
- The Legal Aid in Criminal and Care Proceedings (General) (Amendment) Regulations 1999 (S.I. 1999 No. 346)
- The Council Tax Reduction Scheme (Wales) Regulations 1999 (S.I. 1999 No. 347)
- The Council Tax (Demand Notices) (Wales) (Transitional Provisions) Regulations 1999 (S.I. 1999 No. 348)
- The Motor Cars (Driving Instruction) (Admission of Community Licence Holders) Regulations 1999 (S.I. 1999 No. 357)
- The Corporation Tax (Treatment of Unrelieved Surplus Advance Corporation Tax) Regulations 1999 (S.I. 1999 No. 358)
- The Insolvency (Amendment) Rules 1999 (S.I. 1999 No. 359)
- The Offshore Petroleum Production and Pipe-lines (Assessment of Environmental Effects) Regulations 1999 (S.I. 1999 No. 360)
- The Social Security (Contributions) (Re-rating) Consequential Amendment Regulations 1999 (S.I. 1999 No. 361)
- The Education (Transition to New Framework) (New Schools, Groups and Miscellaneous) Regulations 1999 (S.I. 1999 No. 362)
- The Statutory Maternity Pay (Compensation of Employers) Amendment Regulations 1999 (S.I. 1999 No. 363)
- The Local Government Finance (Scotland) Order 1999 (S.I. 1999 No. 364 (S. 18))
- The National Health Service (Fund-Holding Practices) (Scotland) Amendment Regulations 1999 (S.I. 1999 No. 365 (S. 19))
- The Highland Communities National Health Service Trust (Establishment) Amendment Order 1999 (S.I. 1999 No. 366 (S. 20))
- The Environmental Impact Assessment (Fish Farming in Marine Waters) Regulations 1999 (S.I. 1999 No.367)
- The Highways (Assessment of Environmental Effects) Regulations 1999 (S.I. 1999 No. 369)
- The Birmingham Children's Hospital National Health Service Trust (Establishment) Amendment Order 1999 (S.I. 1999 No. 370)
- The Income Support (General) (Standard Interest Rate Amendment) (No. 2) Regulations 1999 (S.I. 1999 No. 371)
- The Land Authority for Wales (Abolition) Order 1999 (S.I. 1999 No. 372)
- The Development Board for Rural Wales (Abolition) Order 1999 (S.I. 1999 No. 373)
- The Prisons and Young Offenders Institutions (Scotland) Amendment Rules 1999 (S.I. 1999 No. 374 (S. 21))
- The Hill Livestock (Compensatory Allowances) (Amendment) Regulations 1999 (S.I. 1999 No. 375)
- The River Tay Salmon Fishery District (Baits and Lures) Regulations 1999 (S.I. 1999 No. 376 (S. 22))
- The Channel Tunnel Rail Link (Nomination) Order 1999 (S.I. 1999 No. 391)
- The Hyde Park and The Regent's Park (Vehicle Parking) (Amendment) Regulations 1999 (S.I. 1999 No. 392)
- The Registration of Political Parties Act 1998 (Commencement) Order 1999 (S.I. 1999 No. 393 (C. 7))
- The Local Elections (Principal Areas) (Amendment) Rules 1999 (S.I. 1999 No. 394)
- The Local Elections (Parishes and Communities) (Amendment) Rules 1999 (S.I. 1999 No. 395)
- The Environmental Protection Act 1990 (Extension of Section 140) Regulations 1999 (S.I. 1999 No. 396)
- The Education (School Attendance Targets) (England) Regulations 1999 (S.I. 1999 No. 397)
- The Education (School Organisation Committees) (Initial Financial Arrangements) (England) Regulations 1999 (S.I. 1999 No. 398)
- The Food Safety (Fishery Products and Live Shellfish) (Hygiene) Amendment Regulations 1999 (S.I. 1999 No. 399)
- The Welfare of Animals (Slaughter or Killing) (Amendment) Regulations 1999 (S.I. 1999 No. 400)

== 401–500 ==
- The Poole Harbour Revision Order 1999 (S.I. 1999 No. 403)
- The A23 Trunk Road (Croydon) Red Route Traffic Order 1999 (S.I. 1999 No. 414)
- The Sugar Beet (Research and Education) Order 1999 (S.I. 1999 No. 415)
- The Development Commission (Transfer of Functions and Miscellaneous Provisions) Order 1999 (S.I. 1999 No. 416)
- The Social Security Act 1998 (Commencement No. 3) Order 1999 (S.I. 1999 No. 418 (C.8))
- The Taxes (Interest Rate) (Amendment) Regulations 1999 (S.I. 1999 No. 419)
- The Public Lending Right Scheme 1982 (Commencement of Variations) Order 1999 (S.I. 1999 No. 420)
- The Local Authorities (Goods and Services) (Public Bodies) (No. 1) Order 1999 (S.I. 1999 No. 421)
- The Central Nottinghamshire Healthcare National Health Service Trust (Establishment) Amendment Order 1999 (S.I. 1999 No. 422)
- The Lifecare National Health Service Trust (Dissolution) Order 1999 (S.I. 1999 No. 423)
- The Sea Fishing (Enforcement of Community Quota Measures) Order 1999 (S.I. 1999 No. 424)
- The Third Country Fishing (Enforcement) Order 1999 (S.I. 1999 No. 425)
- The Lotteries (Gaming Board Fees) Order 1999 (S.I. 1999 No. 436)
- The Control of Substances Hazardous to Health Regulations 1999 (S.I. 1999 No. 437)
- The Value Added Tax (Amendment) Regulations 1999 (S.I. 1999 No. 438)
- The Electricity (Non-Fossil Fuel Sources) (Scotland) Order 1999 (S.I. 1999 No. 439 (S. 24))
- The Education (Grant-maintained Schools) (Capital Grants) (Wales) Regulations 1999 (S.I. 1999 No. 440)
- The Scotland Act 1998 (Transitory and Transitional Provisions) (Finance) Order 1999 (S.I. 1999 No. 441 (S. 25))
- The St. Andrew's College of Education (Closure) (Scotland) Order 1999 (S.I. 1999 No. 442 (S. 26))
- The National Health Service Superannuation Scheme (Scotland) Amendment Regulations 1999 (S.I. 1999 No. 443 (S. 27))
- The National Health Service (Scotland) (Injury Benefits) Amendment Regulations 1999 (S.I. 1999 No. 444 (S. 28))
- The Prior Rights of Surviving Spouse (Scotland) Order 1999 (S.I. 1999 No. 445 (S. 29))
- The Teachers' Superannuation (Scotland) Amendment Regulations 1999 (S.I. 1999 No. 446 (S. 30))
- The Education (Grants for Education Support and Training) (England) Regulations 1998 (Amendment No. 2) Regulations 1999 (S.I. 1999 No. 447)
- The Landmines Act 1998 (Commencement) Order 1999 (S.I. 1999 No. 448 (C.15))
- The National Assembly for Wales (Disqualification) Order 1999 (S.I. 1999 No. 449)
- The National Assembly for Wales (Representation of the People) Order 1999 (S.I. 1999 No. 450)
- The Education (Budget Statements) (Wales) Regulations 1999 (S.I. 1999 No. 451)
- The Local Government Act 1988 (Defined Activities) (Exemptions) (Havering London Borough Council and Scarborough Borough Council) Order 1999 (S.I. 1999 No. 452)
- The Local Authorities (Capital Finance) (Rate of Discount for 1999/2000) Regulations 1999 (S.I. 1999 No. 453)
- The Northern Ireland Arms Decommissioning Act 1997 (Amnesty Period) Order 1999 (S.I. 1999 No. 454)
- The Waste Management Licences (Consultation and Compensation) Regulations 1999 (S.I. 1999 No. 481)
- The Common Agricultural Policy (Wine) (Amendment) Regulations 1999 (S.I. 1999 No. 482)
- The Crime and Disorder Strategies (Prescribed Descriptions) (Amendment) Order 1999 (S.I. 1999 No. 483)
- The River Tay Estuary Limits Order 1999 (S.I. 1999 No. 484 (S. 31))
- The Education (Budget Statements and Supplementary Provisions) Regulations 1999 (S.I. 1999 No. 486)
- The A1 Trunk Road (Tempsford Junction Improvements Slip Roads) Order 1999 (S.I. 1999 No. 487)
- The A57 Trunk Road (Swallownest Roundabout to M1 Junction 31) (Detrunking) Order 1999 (S.I. 1999 No. 488)
- The A638 Trunk Road (B6273 Garmil Lane West of Wragby to King Royd Lane, Brackenhill Common, Ackworth) (Detrunking) Order 1999 (S.I. 1999 No. 489)
- The Removal and Disposal of Vehicles (Amendment) (Scotland) Regulations 1999 (S.I. 1999 No. 490 (S. 32))
- The Criminal Legal Aid (Fixed Payments) (Scotland) Regulations 1999 (S.I. 1999 No. 491 (S. 33))
- The Scottish Local Elections Amendment (No.2) Rules 1999 (S.I. 1999 No. 492 (S. 34))
- The Education (Amount to Follow Permanently Excluded Pupil) Regulations 1999 (S.I. 1999 No. 495)
- The Education (Student Support) Regulations 1999 (S.I. 1999 No. 496)
- The Amalgamation of the Hilgay Great West Fen and Southery and District Internal Drainage Districts Order 1998 (S.I. 1999 No. 497)
- The Insurance Companies (Capital Redemption Business) (Modification of the Corporation Tax Acts) Regulations 1999 (S.I. 1999 No. 498)
- The Education (School Organisation Plans) (Wales) Regulations 1999 (S.I. 1999 No. 499)
- The Local Government (Committees and Political Groups) (Amendment) Regulations 1999 (S.I. 1999 No. 500)

== 501–600 ==
- The Local Authorities (Capital Finance) (Amendment) Regulations 1999 (S.I. 1999 No. 501)
- The Local Government (Discretionary Payments) (Amendment) Regulations 1999 (S.I. 1999 No. 502)
- The Deregulation (Weights and Measures) Order 1999 (S.I. 1999 No. 503)
- The Weights and Measures (Prescribed Stamp) (Amendment) Regulations 1999 (S.I. 1999 No. 504)
- The Competition Act 1998 (Commencement No. 3) Order 1999 (S.I. 1999 No. 505 (C. 9))
- The Competition Act 1998 (Competition Commission) Transitional, Consequential and Supplemental Provisions Order 1999 (S.I. 1999 No. 506)
- The Superannuation (Application of the Superannuation Act 1972, Section 1) Order 1999 (S.I. 1999 No. 519)
- The Rail Vehicle Accessibility (Midland Metro T69 Vehicles) Exemption Order 1999 (S.I. 1999 No. 520)
- The Education (Education Standards Grants) (Wales) Regulations 1999 (S.I. 1999 No. 521)
- The Pensions Increase (Review) Order 1999 (S.I. 1999 No. 522)
- The Magistrates' Courts Committees (Hampshire and Isle of Wight) Amalgamation Order 1999 (S.I. 1999 No. 523)
- The Children (Allocation of Proceedings) (Amendment) Order 1999 (S.I. 1999 No. 524)
- The Northern Ireland (Emergency Provisions) Act 1996 (Amendment) Order 1999 (S.I. 1999 No. 525)
- The Social Security Act 1998 (Commencement No.4) Order 1999 (S.I. 1999 No. 526 (C.10))
- The Social Security Contributions (Transfer of Functions, etc.) Act 1999 (Commencement No. 1 and Transitional Provisions) Order 1999 (S.I. 1999 No. 527 (C.11))
- The Social Security Act 1998 (Commencement No. 5) Order 1999 (S.I. 1999 No. 528 (C.12))
- The Social Security (Industrial Injuries) (Dependency) (Permitted Earnings Limits) Order 1999 (S.I. 1999 No. 529)
- The Jobseeker's Allowance (Amendment) Regulations 1999 (S.I. 1999 No. 530)
- The School Standards and Framework Act 1998 (Appointed Day) Order 1999 (S.I. 1999 No. 531 (C. 13))
- The Education (Schedule 32 to the School Standards and Framework Act 1998) (England) Regulations 1999 (S.I. 1999 No. 532)
- The Police Act 1996 (Commencement and Transitional Provisions) Order 1999 (S.I. 1999 No. 533 (C. 14))
- The Council Tax (Administration and Enforcement) (Amendment) Regulations 1999 (S.I. 1999 No. 534)
- The Motor Cycles (Eye Protectors) Regulations 1999 (S.I. 1999 No. 535)
- The Council Tax (Exempt Dwellings) (Amendment) Order 1999 (S.I. 1999 No. 536)
- The Channel Tunnel Rail Link (Boarley Lane Diversion) Order 1999 (S.I. 1999 No. 537)
- The Specified Risk Material (Inspection Charges) Regulations 1999 (S.I. 1999 No. 539)
- The Spreadable Fats (Marketing Standards) (Amendment) Regulations 1999 (S.I. 1999 No. 540)
- The Police (Secretary of State's Objectives) Order 1999 (S.I. 1999 No. 543)
- The National Health Service (Dental Charges) Amendment Regulations 1999 (S.I. 1999 No. 544)
- The Local Government (Parishes and Parish Councils) Regulations 1999 (S.I. 1999 No. 545)
- The Environmental Protection (Waste Recycling Payments) (Amendment) Regulations 1999 (S.I. 1999 No. 546)
- The Offshore Installations (Safety Zones) Order 1999 (S.I. 1999 No. 547)
- The National Assistance (Sums for Personal Requirements) Regulations 1999 (S.I. 1999 No. 549)
- The Income-related Benefits (Subsidy to Authorities) Amendment Order 1999 (S.I. 1999 No. 550)
- The Common Investment (Amendment) Scheme 1999 (S.I. 1999 No. 551 (L. 1))
- The A41 Trunk Road (Barnet) Red Route (Prohibited Turn) Experimental Traffic Order 1999 (S.I. 1999 No. 552)
- The A1 Trunk Road (Barnet and Haringey) Red Route Experimental Traffic Order 1999 (S.I. 1999 No. 553)
- The Public Airport Companies (Capital Finance) (Amendment) Order 1999 (S.I. 1999 No. 554)
- The A1 Trunk Road (Barnet and Haringey) Red Route (Clearway) Experimental Traffic Order 1999 (S.I. 1999 No. 555)
- The Social Security (Contributions) Amendment Regulations 1999 (S.I. 1999 No. 561)
- The Finance Act 1993, Section 86(2), (Fish Quota) Order 1999 (S.I. 1999 No. 564)
- The Medicines for Human Use and Medical Devices (Fees and Miscellaneous Amendments) Regulations 1999 (S.I. 1999 No. 566)
- The Social Security Contributions, Statutory Maternity Pay and Statutory Sick Pay (Miscellaneous Amendments) Regulations 1999 (S.I. 1999 No. 567)
- The Social Security (Contributions and Credits) (Miscellaneous Amendments) Regulations 1999 (S.I. 1999 No. 568)
- The National Minimum Wage Act 1998 (Amendment) Regulations 1999 (S.I. 1999 No. 583)
- The National Minimum Wage Regulations 1999 (S.I. 1999 No. 584)
- The Rail Vehicle Accessibility (Midland Metro T69 Vehicles) Exemption (Amendment) Order 1999 (S.I. 1999 No. 586)
- The National Savings Bank (Amendment) Regulations 1999 (S.I. 1999 No. 588)
- The Insurance (Fees) Regulations 1999 (S.I. 1999 No. 589)
- The Organic Farming Regulations 1999 (S.I. 1999 No. 590)
- The Capital Gains Tax (Annual Exempt Amount) Order 1999 (S.I. 1999 No. 591)
- The Retirement Benefits Schemes (Indexation of Earnings Cap) Order 1999 (S.I. 1999 No. 592)
- The Value Added Tax (Buildings and Land) Order 1999 (S.I. 1999 No. 593)
- The Value Added Tax (Finance) Order 1999 (S.I. 1999 No. 594)
- The Value Added Tax (Increase of Registration Limits) Order 1999 (S.I. 1999 No. 595 )
- The Inheritance Tax (Indexation) Order 1999 (S.I. 1999 No. 596)
- The Income Tax (Indexation) Order 1999 (S.I. 1999 No. 597)
- The Crown Court (Miscellaneous Amendments) Rules 1999 (S.I. 1999 No. 598 (L. 2))
- The Value Added Tax (Amendment) (No. 2) Regulations 1999 (S.I. 1999 No. 599)
- The Education Act 1996 (Grant-Maintained Schools) (Grants to Governing Bodies in Liquidation) (Modification) Regulations 1999 (S.I. 1999 No. 600)

== 601–700 ==
- The Education (School Inspection) (Amendment) Regulations 1999 (S.I. 1999 No. 601)
- The High Pavement Sixth Form College, Nottingham (Dissolution) Order 1999 (S.I. 1999 No. 602)
- The Education (Fees at Higher Education Institutions) Regulations 1999 (S.I. 1999 No. 603)
- The Education (Transfer of Functions Concerning School Lunches) (England) Order 1999 (S.I. 1999 No. 604)
- The Education (Post 16 Partnership Grant) (England) Regulations 1999 (S.I. 1999 No. 605)
- The Education (Education Standards Etc. Grants) (England) Regulations 1999 (S.I. 1999 No. 606)
- The Teachers' Pensions (Amendment) Regulations 1999 (S.I. 1999 No. 607)
- The Teachers (Compensation for Redundancy and Premature Retirement) (Amendment) Regulations 1999 (S.I. 1999 No. 608)
- The National Health Service (Optical Charges and Payments) Amendment Regulations 1999 (S.I. 1999 No. 609)
- The Education (Transfer of Functions Concerning School Lunches) (Wales) Order 1999 (S.I. 1999 No. 610)
- The Housing (Right to Buy) (Cost Floor) (Scotland) Order 1999 (S.I. 1999 No. 611 (S. 35))
- The National Health Service (Charges for Drugs and Appliances) (Scotland) Amendment Regulations 1999 (S.I. 1999 No. 612 (S. 36))
- Act of Sederunt (Fees of Shorthand Writers in the Sheriff Court) (Amendment) 1999 (S.I. 1999 No. 613 (S.37))
- The Local Authorities' Traffic Orders (Procedure) (Scotland) Regulations 1999 (S.I. 1999 No. 614 (S. 38))
- Act of Sederunt (Rules of the Court of Session Amendment No. 2) (Fees of Shorthand Writers) 1999 (S.I. 1999 No. 615 (S.39))
- The Health Authorities (England) Establishment Order 1996 Amendment and the Cambridgeshire and Norfolk Health Authorities (Establishment etc.) Order 1999 (S.I. 1999 No. 616)
- The Motor Vehicles (Driving Licences) (Amendment) (No. 2) Regulations 1999 (S.I. 1999 No. 617)
- The Civil Aviation (Navigation Services Charges) (Second Amendment) Regulations 1999 (S.I. 1999 No. 618)
- The Finance Act 1998, Section 37, (Appointed Day) Order 1999 (S.I. 1999 No. 619 (C. 16))
- The Gilt-edged Securities (Periodic Accounting for Tax on Interest) (Amendment) Regulations 1999 (S.I. 1999 No. 620)
- The Manufactured Dividends (Tax) (Amendment) Regulations 1999 (S.I. 1999 No. 621)
- The Friendly Societies (Provisional Repayments for Exempt Business) Regulations 1999 (S.I. 1999 No. 622)
- The Insurance Companies (Gilt-edged Securities) (Periodic Accounting for Tax on Interest) Regulations 1999 (S.I. 1999 No. 623)
- The Friendly Societies (Gilt-edged Securities) (Periodic Accounting for Tax on Interest) Regulations 1999 (S.I. 1999 No. 624)
- The North Bristol National Health Service Trust (Establishment) Order 1999 (S.I. 1999 No. 625)
- The Frenchay Healthcare and the Southmead Health Services National Health Service Trusts (Dissolution) Order 1999 (S.I. 1999 No. 626)
- The Northumbria Health Care National Health Service Trust (Transfer of Trust Property) Order 1999 (S.I. 1999 No. 627)
- The National Health Service (Functions of Health Authorities and Administration Arrangements) Amendment Regulations 1999 (S.I. 1999 No. 628)
- The Swindon and Marlborough National Health Service Trust (Establishment) Amendment Order 1999 (S.I. 1999 No. 630)
- The Mancunian Community Health National Health Service Trust (Establishment) Amendment Order 1999 (S.I. 1999 No. 631)
- The St. Helens and Knowsley Hospital Services National Health Service Trust (Establishment) Amendment Order 1999 (S.I. 1999 No. 632)
- The Cornwall Healthcare National Health Service Trust (Establishment) Amendment Order 1999 (S.I. 1999 No. 633)
- The Trecare National Health Service Trust (Dissolution) Order 1999 (S.I. 1999 No. 634)
- The Lincoln District Healthcare National Health Service Trust (Establishment) Amendment Order 1999 (S.I. 1999 No. 636)
- The West Lindsey National Health Service Trust (Dissolution) Order 1999 (S.I. 1999 No. 637)
- The School Standards and Framework Act 1998 (Modification, Transitional and Consequential Provisions) Regulations 1999 (S.I. 1999 No. 638)
- The Road Traffic (Permitted Parking Area and Special Parking Area) (County of Kent) (Borough of Maidstone) (Amendment) (No. 2) Order 1999 (S.I. 1999 No. 639)
- The North Staffordshire Combined Healthcare National Health Service Trust (Establishment) Amendment Order 1999 (S.I. 1999 No. 640)
- The National Health Service Estate Management and Health Building Agency Trading Fund Order 1999 (S.I. 1999 No. 641)
- The Housing Benefit (Permitted Totals) (Amendment) Order 1999 (S.I. 1999 No. 642)
- The Merchant Shipping (Cargo Ship Construction) (Amendment) Regulations 1999 (S.I. 1999 No. 643)
- The Medicines (Sale or Supply) (Miscellaneous Provisions) Amendment Regulations 1999 (S.I. 1999 No. 644)
- The Health and Safety (Fees) Regulations 1999 (S.I. 1999 No. 645)
- The Animal By-Products Order 1999 (S.I. 1999 No. 646)
- The Highlands and Islands Agricultural Programme Amendment Regulations 1999 (S.I. 1999 No. 647 (S. 40))
- The Planning and Compensation Act 1991 (Amendment of Schedule 18) Order 1999 (S.I. 1999 No. 648)
- The Food Protection (Emergency Prohibitions) (Paralytic Shellfish Poisoning) (No.2) Order 1998 Partial Revocation Order 1999 (S.I. 1999 No. 649)
- The National Lottery Act 1998 (Commencement) Order 1999 (S.I. 1999 No. 650 (C.17))
- The Rural Diversification Programme (Scotland) Amendment Regulations 1999 (S.I. 1999 No. 651 (S. 41))
- The Crime and Punishment (Scotland) Act 1997 (Commencement No. 5 and Transitional Provisions and Savings) Order 1999 (S.I. 1999 No. 652 (C. 18) (S. 42))
- The Scottish Ambulance Service National Health Service Trust (Dissolution) Order 1999 (S.I. 1999 No. 653 (S. 43))
- The European Communities (Designation) Order 1999 (S.I. 1999 No. 654)
- The Consular Fees Order 1999 (S.I. 1999 No. 655)
- The Corporation of the Cranleigh and Bramley Schools (Charter Amendments) Order 1999 (S.I. 1999 No. 656)
- The Education (Inspectors of Schools in Wales) Order 1999 (S.I. 1999 No. 657)
- The Appropriation (Northern Ireland) Order 1999 (S.I. 1999 No. 658 (N.I. 2))
- The Energy Efficiency (Northern Ireland) Order 1999 (S.I. 1999 No. 659 (N.I. 3))
- The Strategic Planning (Northern Ireland) Order 1999 (S.I. 1999 No. 660 (N.I. 4))
- The Trade Union Subscription Deductions (Northern Ireland) Order 1999 (S.I. 1999 No. 661 (N.I. 5))
- The Water (Northern Ireland) Order 1999 (S.I. 1999 No. 662 (N.I. 6))
- The Northern Ireland (Modification of Enactments—No. 1) Order 1999 (S.I. 1999 No. 663)
- The Northern Ireland (Royal Assent to Bills) Order 1999 (S.I. 1999 No. 664)
- The Judicial Committee (Devolution Issues) Rules Order 1999 (S.I. 1999 No. 665)
- The Hong Kong (Overseas Public Servants) (Pension Supplements) (Amendment) Order 1999 (S.I. 1999 No. 666)
- The Royal College of Physicians of London (Charter Amendment) Order 1999 (S.I. 1999 No. 667)
- The State Immunity (Merchant Shipping) (Revocation) Order 1999 (S.I. 1999 No. 668)
- The Environment Protection (Overseas Territories) (Amendment) Order 1999 (S.I. 1999 No. 669)
- The Diplomatic Privileges (British Nationals) Order 1999 (S.I. 1999 No. 670)
- The Social Security Contributions (Transfer of Functions, etc.) (Northern Ireland) Order 1999 (S.I. 1999 No. 671)
- The National Assembly for Wales (Transfer of Functions) Order 1999 (S.I. 1999 No. 672)
- The Confiscation of the Proceeds of Crime (Designated Countries and Territories) (Scotland) Order 1999 (S.I. 1999 No. 673 (S.44))
- The Scotland Act 1998 (Transitory and Transitional Provisions) (Appropriations) Order 1999 (S.I. 1999 No. 674 (S. 45))
- The Criminal Justice (International Co-operation) Act 1990 (Enforcement of Overseas Forfeiture Orders) (Scotland) Order 1999 (S.I. 1999 No. 675 (S.46))
- The Parliamentary Copyright (Scottish Parliament) Order 1999 (S.I. 1999 No. 676)
- The Scottish Parliamentary Corporate Body (Crown Status) Order 1999 (S.I. 1999 No. 677)
- The Transfer of Functions (Lord Advocate and Secretary of State) Order 1999 (S.I. 1999 No. 678)
- The Transfer of Functions (Lord Advocate and Advocate General for Scotland) Order 1999 (S.I. 1999 No. 679)
- The Scottish Parliament (Disqualification) Order 1999 (S.I. 1999 No. 680)
- The Magistrates' Courts (Hearsay Evidence in Civil Proceedings) Rules 1999 (S.I. 1999 No. 681 (L.3))
- The Occupational and Personal Pension Schemes (Levy) Amendment Regulations 1999 (S.I. 1999 No. 682)
- The Meat Products (Hygiene) (Amendment) Regulations 1999 (S.I. 1999 No. 683)
- The Income Tax (Cash Equivalents of Car Fuel Benefits) Order 1999 (S.I. 1999 No. 684)
- The National Minimum Wage Act 1998 (Commencement No. 2 and Transitional Provisions) Order 1999 (S.I. 1999 No. 685 (C. 19))
- The Scottish Ambulance Service Board Order 1999 (S.I. 1999 No. 686 (S. 47))
- The Supreme Court Fees Order 1999 (S.I. 1999 No. 687 (L. 4))
- The Non-Contentious Probate Fees Order 1999 (S.I. 1999 No. 688 (L. 5))
- The County Court Fees Order 1999 (S.I. 1999 No. 689 (L. 6))
- The Family Proceedings Fees Order 1999 (S.I. 1999 No. 690 (L. 7))
- The Public Record Office (Fees) Regulations 1999 (S.I. 1999 No. 691)
- The Crown Office Fees Order 1999 (S.I. 1999 No. 692)
- The National Health Service (General Ophthalmic Services) (Amendment) Regulations 1999 (S.I. 1999 No. 693)
- The National Health Service Information Authority Regulations 1999 (S.I. 1999 No. 694)
- The National Health Service Information Authority (Establishment and Constitution) Order 1999 (S.I. 1999 No. 695)
- The National Health Service (Pharmaceutical Services) Amendment Regulations 1999 (S.I. 1999 No. 696)
- The Calshot Oyster Fishery (Variation) Order 1999 (S.I. 1999 No. 697)
- The Education (Grant-maintained and Grant-maintained Special Schools) (Grants) (England) Regulations 1999 (S.I. 1999 No. 698)
- The Brackenhurst College, Southwell (Dissolution) Order 1999 (S.I. 1999 No. 699)
- The Education (School Organisation Committees) (England) Regulations 1999 (S.I. 1999 No. 700)

== 701–800 ==
- The Education (School Organisation Plans) (England) Regulations 1999 (S.I. 1999 No. 701)
- The Education (References to Adjudicator) Regulations 1999 (S.I. 1999 No. 702)
- The Education (Governors' Allowances) Regulations 1999 (S.I. 1999 No. 703)
- The Education (Transition to New Framework) (School Organisation Proposals) Regulations 1999 (S.I. 1999 No. 704)
- Staffing of Grant-maintained and Grant-maintained Special Schools (Transitional Provisions) Regulations 1999 (S.I. 1999 No. 705)
- The East Durham and Houghall Community College (Incorporation) Order 1999 (S.I. 1999 No. 706)
- The East Durham and Houghall Community College (Government) Regulations 1999 (S.I. 1999 No. 707)
- The Leicester College (Incorporation) Order 1999 (S.I. 1999 No. 708)
- The Leicester College (Government) Regulations 1999 (S.I. 1999 No. 709)
- The Education (Payment for Special Educational Needs Supplies) Regulations 1999 (S.I. 1999 No. 710)
- The Education (References to Delegated Budgets and Revocation) Regulations 1999 (S.I. 1999 No. 711)
- The Agricultural Wages Act 1948 (Amendment) Regulations 1999 (S.I. 1999 No. 712)
- The Road Vehicles (Statutory Off-Road Notification) (Amendment) Regulations 1999 (S.I. 1999 No. 713)
- The Social Security Benefits (Miscellaneous Amendments) Regulations 1999 (S.I. 1999 No. 714)
- The Local Government Officers (Political Restrictions) (Amendment) Regulations 1999 (S.I. 1999 No. 715)
- The Criminal Procedure and Investigations Act 1996 (Commencement) (Section 67) Order 1999 (S.I. 1999 No. 716 (C.20))
- The European Parliamentary Elections Act 1999 (Commencement) Order 1999 (S.I. 1999 No. 717 (C. 21))
- The Criminal Procedure and Investigations Act 1996 (Appointed Day No.9) Order 1999 (S.I. 1999 No. 718 (C. 22))
- The Capital Allowances (Corresponding Northern Ireland Grants) Order 1999 (S.I. 1999 No. 719)
- The Workmen's Compensation (Supplementation) (Amendment) Scheme 1999 (S.I. 1999 No. 720)
- The Southern Derbyshire Acute Hospitals National Health Service Trust (Transfer of Trust Property) Order 1999 (S.I. 1999 No. 721)
- The National Assembly for Wales (Day of First Ordinary Election) (Postponement of Community Councils Elections etc.) Order 1999 (S.I. 1999 No. 722)
- The Housing Accommodation and Homelessness (Persons subject to Immigration Control) (Amendment) (Scotland) Order 1999 (S.I. 1999 No. 723 (S. 48))
- The National Health Service (Dental Services) (Miscellaneous Amendments) (Scotland) Regulations 1999 (S.I. 1999 No. 724 (S. 49))
- The National Health Service (General Ophthalmic Services) (Scotland) Amendment Regulations 1999 (S.I. 1999 No. 725 (S. 50))
- The Clinical Standards Board for Scotland Order 1999 (S.I. 1999 No. 726 (S. 57))
- The Financial Services Act 1986 (Commencement) (No. 14) Order 1999 (S.I. 1999 No. 727 (C. 23))
- The Prison Rules 1999 (S.I. 1999 No. 728)
- The Police (Conduct) Regulations 1999 (S.I. 1999 No. 730)
- The Police (Conduct) (Senior Officers) Regulations 1999 (S.I. 1999 No. 731)
- The Police (Efficiency) Regulations 1999 (S.I. 1999 No. 732)
- The Public Offers of Securities (Amendment) Regulations 1999 (S.I. 1999 No. 734)
- The Overseas Service (Pensions Supplement) (Amendment) Regulations 1999 (S.I. 1999 No. 735)
- THE FRIENDLY SOCIETIES (GENERAL CHARGE AND FEES) REGULATIONS 1999 (S.I. 1999 No. 736)
- The Scottish Parliament (Letters Patent and Proclamations) Order 1999 (S.I. 1999 No. 737)
- The Building Societies (General Charge and Fees ) Regulations 1999 (S.I. 1999 No. 738)
- The Industrial and Provident Societies (Credit Unions) (Fees) Regulations 1999 (S.I. 1999 No. 739)
- The Industrial and Provident Societies (Fees) Regulations 1999 (S.I. 1999 No. 740)
- The Misuse of Drugs (Licence Fees) (Amendment) Regulations 1999 (S.I. 1999 No. 741)
- The Deregulation (Pipe-lines) Order 1999 (S.I. 1999 No. 742)
- The Control of Major Accident Hazards Regulations 1999 (S.I. 1999 No. 743)
- The Food Labelling (Amendment) Regulations 1999 (S.I. 1999 No. 747)
- The National Health Service (Optical Charges and Payments) (Scotland) Amendment Regulations 1999 (S.I. 1999 No. 748 (S. 52))
- The National Health Service (General Medical Services) (Scotland) Amendment Regulations 1999 (S.I. 1999 No. 749 (S. 53))
- The Agricultural Wages (Scotland) Act 1949 (Amendment) Regulations 1999 (S.I. 1999 No. 750 (S. 54))
- The Inshore Fishing (Prohibition of Fishing and Fishing Methods) (Scotland) Amendment Order 1999 (S.I. 1999 No. 751 (S. 55))
- The Bankruptcy Fees (Scotland) Amendment Regulations 1999 (S.I. 1999 No. 752 (S. 56))
- The High Court of Justiciary Fees Amendment Order 1999 (S.I. 1999 No. 753 (S. 57))
- The Sheriff Court Fees Amendment Order 1999 (S.I. 1999 No. 754 (S. 58))
- The Court of Session etc. Fees Amendment Order 1999 (S.I. 1999 No. 755 (S. 59))
- The Council Tax (Reductions for Disabilities) (Scotland) Amendment Regulations 1999 (S.I. 1999 No. 756 (S. 60))
- The Council Tax (Exempt Dwellings) (Scotland) Amendment Order 1999 (S.I. 1999 No. 757 (S. 61))
- The Wireless Telegraphy (Television Licence Fees) (Amendment) Regulations 1999 (S.I. 1999 No. 765)
- The National Board for Nursing, Midwifery and Health Visiting for England (Constitution and Administration) Amendment Order 1999 (S.I. 1999 No. 766)
- The National Health Service (Charges for Drugs and Appliances and Travelling Expenses and Remission of Charges) Amendment Regulations 1999 (S.I. 1999 No. 767)
- The Road Traffic (Permitted Parking Area and Special Parking Area) (City of Portsmouth) Order 1999 (S.I. 1999 No. 768)
- The Statutory Sick Pay and Statutory Maternity Pay (Decisions) Regulations 1999 (S.I. 1999 No. 776)
- The Local Government Act 1988 (Defined Activities) (Exemption) (Burnley Borough Council and Epping Forest District Council) Order 1999 (S.I. 1999 No. 777)
- The Motor Vehicles (EC Type Approval) (Amendment) Regulations 1999 (S.I. 1999 No. 778)
- The New Deal (25 plus) (Miscellaneous Provisions) Order 1999 (S.I. 1999 No. 779)
- The Parliamentary Pension Scheme (Additional Voluntary Contributions) (Amendment) Regulations 1999 (S.I. 1999 No. 780)
- The Housing for Wales (Abolition) Order 1999 (S.I. 1999 No. 781)
- The Government of Wales Act 1998 (Commencement No. 4) Order 1999 (S.I. 1999 No. 782 (C. 24))
- The Plant Health (Fees) (Forestry) (Great Britain) (Amendment) Regulations 1999 (S.I. 1999 No. 783)
- The Medicines (Monitoring of Advertising) Amendment Regulations 1999 (S.I. 1999 No. 784)
- The Road Traffic (NHS Charges) Regulations 1999 (S.I. 1999 No. 785)
- The Road Traffic (NHS Charges) (Reviews and Appeals) Regulations 1999 (S.I. 1999 No. 786)
- The Scottish Parliament (Elections etc.) Order 1999 (S.I. 1999 No. 787)
- The Scottish Parliament (First Ordinary General Election and First Meeting) Order 1999 (S.I. 1999 No. 788)
- The A423 Banbury to South of Coventry Trunk Road (Marton River Bridge Improvement) Order 1999 (S.I. 1999 No. 789)
- The Mulberry National Health Service Trust (Dissolution) Order 1999 (S.I. 1999 No. 790)
- The Derbyshire Ambulance Service, the Leicestershire Ambulance and Paramedic Service and the Nottinghamshire Ambulance Service National Health Service Trusts (Dissolution) Order 1999 (S.I. 1999 No. 791)
- The South Lincolnshire Community and Mental Health Services National Health Service Trust (Establishment) Amendment Order 1999 (S.I. 1999 No. 792)
- The Merton and Sutton Community, the Richmond, Twickenham and Roehampton Healthcare and the Wandsworth Community Health National Health Service Trusts (Dissolution) Order 1999 (S.I. 1999 No. 793)
- The South West London Community National Health Service Trust (Establishment) Order 1999 (S.I. 1999 No. 794)
- The Teddington Memorial Hospital National Health Service Trust (Establishment) Amendment Order 1999 (S.I. 1999 No. 795)
- The Northumbria Ambulance Service and the Durham County Ambulance Service National Health Service Trusts (Dissolution) Order 1999 (S.I. 1999 No. 796)
- The North East Ambulance Service National Health Service Trust (Establishment) Order 1999 (S.I. 1999 No. 797)
- The Tees, East and North Yorkshire Ambulance Service National Health Service Trust (Establishment) Order 1999 (S.I. 1999 No. 798)
- The Cleveland Ambulance, the Humberside Ambulance Service and the North Yorkshire Ambulance Service National Health Service Trusts (Dissolution) Order 1999 (S.I. 1999 No. 799)
- The Hartlepool and East Durham, the North Tees Health and the South Tees Community and Mental Health National Health Service Trusts (Dissolution) Order 1999 (S.I. 1999 No. 800)

== 801–900 ==
- The North Tees and Hartlepool National Health Service Trust (Establishment) Order 1999 (S.I. 1999 No. 801)
- The Nursery Education (England) (Amendment) Regulations 1999 (S.I. 1999 No. 802)
- The Environment Act 1995 (Commencement No. 14) Order 1999 (S.I. 1999 No. 803 (C. 25))
- The Welsh Health Common Services Authority (Abolition) Order 1999 (S.I. 1999 No. 804)
- The Health Promotion Authority for Wales (Revocation) Regulations 1999 (S.I. 1999 No. 805)
- The Welsh Health Common Services Authority (Revocation) Regulations 1999 (S.I. 1999 No. 806)
- The Health Promotion Authority for Wales (Abolition) Order 1999 (S.I. 1999 No. 807)
- The Velindre National Health Service Trust (Transfer of Trust Property) Order 1999 (S.I. 1999 No. 808)
- The National Health Service Trusts (Originating Capital Debt) Order 1999 (S.I. 1999 No. 809)
- The Civil Legal Aid (Assessment of Resources) (Amendment) Regulations 1999 (S.I. 1999 No. 813)
- The Legal Advice and Assistance (Amendment) Regulations 1999 (S.I. 1999 No. 814)
- The Legal Aid in Criminal and Care Proceedings (General) (Amendment) (No. 2) Regulations 1999 (S.I. 1999 No. 815)
- The Legal Aid (Mediation in Family Matters) (Amendment) Regulations 1999 (S.I. 1999 No. 816)
- The Defamation Act 1996 (Commencement No. 1) Order 1999 (S.I. 1999 No. 817 (C. 26))
- The Police Appeals Tribunals Rules 1999 (S.I. 1999 No. 818)
- The Venture Capital Trust (Amendment) Regulations 1999 (S.I. 1999 No. 819)
- The Social Security (Overlapping Benefits) Amendment Regulations 1999 (S.I. 1999 No. 820)
- The National Crime Squad (Secretary of State's Objectives) Order 1999 (S.I. 1999 No. 821)
- The NCIS (Secretary of State's Objectives) Order 1999 (S.I. 1999 No. 822)
- The Income Tax (Paying and Collecting Agents) (Amendment) Regulations 1999 (S.I. 1999 No. 823)
- The Income Tax (Employments) (Amendment No. 2) Regulations 1999 (S.I. 1999 No. 824)
- The Income Tax (Sub-contractors in the Construction Industry) (Amendment) Regulations 1999 (S.I. 1999 No. 825)
- The Velindre National Health Service Trust (Establishment) Amendment Order 1999 (S.I. 1999 No. 826)
- The Social Security (Contributions) Amendment (No. 2) Regulations 1999 (S.I. 1999 No. 827)
- The Housing Support Grant (Scotland) Order 1999 (S.I. 1999 No. 828 (S. 62))
- The Scottish Parliament (Regional Returning Officers) (Scotland) (No.2) Order 1999 (S.I. 1999 No. 829)
- The Education (Recognised Bodies) Order 1999 (S.I. 1999 No. 833)
- The Education (Listed Bodies) Order 1999 (S.I. 1999 No. 834)
- The Sea Fish Industry Authority (Levy) (Amendment) Regulations 1998 Confirmatory Order 1999 (S.I. 1999 No. 837)
- The Tees and North East Yorkshire National Health Service Trust (Establishment) Order 1999 (S.I. 1999 No. 847)
- The Epsom and St. Helier National Health Service Trust (Establishment) Order 1999 (S.I. 1999 No. 848)
- The Epsom Health Care and the St. Helier National Health Service Trusts (Dissolution) Order 1999 (S.I. 1999 No. 849)
- The Allington, the East Suffolk Local Health Services and the Mid Anglia Community Health National Health Service Trusts (Dissolution) Order 1999 (S.I. 1999 No. 850)
- The Local Health Partnerships National Health Service Trust (Establishment) Order 1999 (S.I. 1999 No. 851)
- The Medicines (Products Other Than Veterinary Drugs) (General Sale List) Amendment Order 1999 (S.I. 1999 No. 852)
- The Railways (Rateable Values) (Scotland) Order 1999 (S.I. 1999 No. 853 (S. 63))
- The Functions of Traffic Wardens (Scotland) Order 1999 (S.I. 1999 No. 854 (S. 64))
- The Public Trustee (Fees) Order 1999 (S.I. 1999 No. 855)
- The Protection of Wrecks (M/S Estonia) Order 1999 (S.I. 1999 No. 856)
- The Injuries in War (Shore Employments) Compensation (Amendment) Scheme 1999 (S.I. 1999 No. 857)
- The Social Security Benefits Up-rating Regulations 1999 (S.I. 1999 No. 858)
- The North/South Co-operation (Implementation Bodies) (Northern Ireland) Order 1999 (S.I. 1999 No. 859)
- The Police (Health and Safety) Regulations 1999 (S.I. 1999 No. 860)
- The Measuring Instruments (EEC Requirements) (Fees) (Amendment) Regulations 1999 (S.I. 1999 No. 861)
- The Social Security Benefits Up-rating and Miscellaneous Increases Regulations 1999 (S.I. 1999 No. 862)
- The National Health Service (Liabilities to Third Parties Scheme) Regulations 1999 (S.I. 1999 No. 873)
- The National Health Service (Property Expenses Scheme) Regulations 1999 (S.I. 1999 No. 874)
- The Overseas Insurers (Tax Representatives) Regulations 1999 (S.I. 1999 No. 881)
- The Bovine Spongiform Encephalopathy (Feeding Stuffs and Surveillance) Regulations 1999 (S.I. 1999 No. 882)
- The Southampton University Hospitals National Health Service Trust (Establishment) Amendment Order 1999 (S.I. 1999 No. 884)
- The Cornwall Healthcare National Health Service Trust (Establishment) Amendment (No. 2) Order 1999 (S.I. 1999 No. 885)
- The Weston Park Hospital National Health Service Trust (Dissolution) Order 1999 (S.I. 1999 No. 886)
- The Central Sheffield University Hospitals National Health Service Trust (Establishment) Amendment Order 1999 (S.I. 1999 No. 887)
- The Sefton and Lancashire Community National Health Service Trust (Establishment) Order 1999 (S.I. 1999 No. 888)
- The Southport and Formby, the Southport and Formby Community Health Services and the West Lancashire National Health Service Trusts (Dissolution) Order 1999 (S.I. 1999 No. 889)
- The Southport & Ormskirk Hospital National Health Service Trust (Establishment) Order 1999 (S.I. 1999 No. 890)
- The Bath Mental Health Care National Health Service Trust (Establishment) Amendment Order 1999 (S.I. 1999 No. 891)
- The Barnet and Chase Farm Hospitals National Health Service Trust (Establishment) Order 1999 (S.I. 1999 No. 892)
- The Chase Farm Hospitals and the Wellhouse National Health Service Trusts (Dissolution) Order 1999 (S.I. 1999 No. 893)
- The Bedford and Shires Health and Care and the South Bedfordshire Community Health Care National Health Service Trusts (Dissolution) Order 1999 (S.I. 1999 No. 894)
- The Bedfordshire and Luton Community National Health Service Trust (Establishment) Order 1999 (S.I. 1999 No. 895)
- The East Kent Hospitals National Health Service Trust (Establishment) Order 1999 (S.I. 1999 No. 896)
- The Kent and Canterbury Hospitals, the South Kent Hospitals and the Thanet Health Care National Health Service Trusts (Dissolution) Order 1999 (S.I. 1999 No. 897)
- The Community Health South London National Health Service Trust (Establishment) Order 1999 (S.I. 1999 No. 898)
- The South London and Maudsley National Health Service Trust (Establishment) Order 1999 (S.I. 1999 No. 899)
- The Bethlem and Maudsley, the Lambeth Healthcare, the Lewisham and Guy's Mental Health and the Optimum Health Services National Health Service Trusts (Dissolution) Order 1999 (S.I. 1999 No. 900)

== 901–1000 ==
- The Education (Individual Pupil Information) (Prescribed Persons) Regulations 1999 (S.I. 1999 No. 903)
- The Prosecution of Offences Act 1985 (Specified Proceedings) Order 1999 (S.I. 1999 No. 904)
- The Public Lending Right (Increase of Limit) Order 1999 (S.I. 1999 No. 905)
- The Prevention of Terrorism (Temporary Provisions) Act 1989 (Continuance) Order 1999 (S.I. 1999 No. 906)
- The Income Support (General) (Standard InterestRate Amendment) (No. 3) Regulations 1999 (S.I. 1999 No. 907)
- The Parkside National Health Service Trust (Establishment) Amendment Order 1999 (S.I. 1999 No. 908)
- The Royal London Homoeopathic National Health Service Trust (Dissolution) Order 1999 (S.I. 1999 No. 909)
- The East Midlands Ambulance Service National Health Service Trust (Establishment) Order 1999 (S.I. 1999 No. 910)
- The North West London Hospitals National Health Service Trust (Establishment) Order 1999 (S.I. 1999 No. 913)
- The Central Middlesex Hospital and the Northwick Park and St. Mark's National Health Service Trusts (Dissolution) Order 1999 (S.I. 1999 No. 914)
- The Water Protection Zone (River Dee Catchment) Designation Order 1999 (S.I. 1999 No. 915)
- The Water Protection Zone (River Dee Catchment) (Procedural and Other Provisions) Regulations 1999 (S.I. 1999 No. 916)
- The Education (School Teachers' Pay and Conditions) Order 1999 (S.I. 1999 No. 917)
- The Diseases of Animals (Approved Disinfectants) (Amendment) Order 1999 (S.I. 1999 No. 919)
- The Housing Benefit and Council Tax Benefit(General) Amendment Regulations 1999 (S.I. 1999 No. 920)
- The Bovine Spongiform Encephalopathy (No. 2) (Amendment) Order 1999 (S.I. 1999 No. 921)
- Act of Sederunt (Summary Applications, Statutory Applications and Appeals etc. Rules) 1999 (S.I. 1999 No. 929 (S. 65))
- The Wireless Telegraphy (Exemption) Regulations 1999 (S.I. 1999 No. 930)
- The United Kingdom Ecolabelling Board (Abolition) Regulations 1999 (S.I. 1999 No. 931)
- The National Assembly for Wales (Returning Officers' Charges) Order 1999 (S.I. 1999 No. 942)
- The National Assembly for Wales (Combination of Polls) (Apportionment of Cost) Order 1999 (S.I. 1999 No. 943)
- The National Assembly for Wales (First Meeting) Order 1999 (S.I. 1999 No. 944)
- The National Health Service Trusts (Membership and Procedure) Amendment Regulations 1999 (S.I. 1999 No. 945)
- The Health Authorities (Membership and Procedure) Amendment Regulations 1999 (S.I. 1999 No. 946)
- The European Parliamentary Elections (Returning Officers) Order 1999 (S.I. 1999 No. 948)
- The European Parliamentary Elections (Day of Poll) Order 1999 (S.I. 1999 No. 949)
- The Returning Officers (Parliamentary Constituencies) (England) (Amendment) Order 1999 (S.I. 1999 No. 950)
- The Housing (Right to Buy) (Priority of Charges) Order 1999 (S.I. 1999 No. 952)
- The Education (Secondary Education in Further Education Institutions) Regulations 1999 (S.I. 1999 No. 954)
- The Young Offender Institution (Amendment) (No. 2) Rules 1999 (S.I. 1999 No. 962)
- The Education (Inspection of Vocational Training) (Prescribed Persons and Bodies Awarding or Authenticating Vocational Qualifications) Regulations 1999 (S.I. 1999 No. 963)
- The Ordnance Survey Trading Fund Order 1999 (S.I. 1999 No. 965)
- The New Opportunities Fund (Specification of Initiatives) Order 1999 (S.I. 1999 No. 966)
- The Social Security (Contributions) Amendment (No. 3) Regulations 1999 (S.I. 1999 No. 975)
- The Social Security (New Deal Pilot) Amendment Regulations 1999 (S.I. 1999 No. 976)
- The Child Support (Miscellaneous Amendments) Regulations 1999 (S.I. 1999 No. 977)
- The Social Security Contributions, etc. (Decisions and Appeals—Transitional Modifications) Regulations 1999 (S.I. 1999 No. 978)
- The Social Security Contributions (Transfer of Functions, etc.) (Specification of Contracts) Order 1999 (S.I. 1999 No. 979)
- Distraint by Authorised Officers (Fees, Costs and Charges) Regulations 1999 (S.I. 1999 No. 980)
- The Planning (Control of Major-Accident Hazards) Regulations 1999 (S.I. 1999 No. 981)
- The Sweeteners in Food (Amendment) Regulations 1999 (S.I. 1999 No. 982)
- The Register of Patent Agents and the Register of Trade Mark Agents (Amendment) Rules 1999 (S.I. 1999 No. 983)
- The Dual-Use and Related Goods (Export Control) (Amendment) Regulations 1999 (S.I. 1999 No. 984)
- The Social Landlords (Additional Purposes or Objects) Order 1999 (S.I. 1999 No. 985)
- The Right to Time Off for Study or Training Regulations 1999 (S.I. 1999 No. 986)
- The Teaching and Higher Education Act 1998 (Commencement No. 5) Order 1999 (S.I. 1999 No. 987 (C. 27))
- The Epsom College (Modification) Order 1999 (S.I. 1999 No. 988)
- The Education (Information About Individual Pupils) (England) Regulations 1999 (S.I. 1999 No. 989)
- The Social Security and Child Support (Decisions and Appeals) Regulations 1999 (S.I. 1999 No. 991)
- The Merchant Shipping (Fire Protection) (Amendment) Regulations 1999 (S.I. 1999 No. 992)
- The Combined Probation Areas (Oxfordshire and Buckinghamshire) Order 1999 (S.I. 1999 No. 993)
- The Combined Probation Areas (Berkshire) Order 1999 (S.I. 1999 No. 994)
- The Limit in Relation to Licences to Provide Radio Multiplex Services Order 1999 (S.I. 1999 No. 995)
- The A205 Trunk Road (Greenwich) Red Route Traffic Order 1998 Variation Order 1999 (S.I. 1999 No. 996)
- The A1 Trunk Road (Barnet) Red Route (Clearway) Traffic Order 1996 Experimental Variation Order 1999 (S.I. 1999 No. 997)
- The London Borough of Barnet (Trunk Roads) Red Route (Priority Traffic Lanes) Experimental Traffic Order 1999 (S.I. 1999 No. 998)
- The Road Humps and Traffic Calming (Scotland) Amendment Regulations 1999 (S.I. 1999 No. 1000 (S. 70))

== 1001–1100 ==
- The Education (Student Loans) (Scotland) Regulations 1999 (S.I. 1999 No. 1001 (S. 71))
- The Wildlife and Countryside Act 1981 (Variation of Schedule 9) Order 1999 (S.I. 1999 No. 1002)
- The Railways (Rateable Values) (Amendment) Order 1999 (S.I. 1999 No. 1003)
- The Council Tax (Reductions for Disabilities) (Amendment) Regulations 1999 (S.I. 1999 No. 1004)
- The Food Protection (Emergency Prohibitions) (Amnesic Shellfish Poisoning) Order 1999 (S.I. 1999 No. 1005)
- The Anti-Pollution Works Regulations 1999 (S.I. 1999 No. 1006)
- The Highway Litter Clearance and Cleaning (Transfer Of Responsibility) (North West Leicestershire and South Derbyshire) Order 1999 (S.I. 1999 No. 1007)
- The Civil Procedure (Amendment) Rules 1999 (S.I. 1999 No. 1008 (L. 8))
- The Civil Procedure Act 1997 (Commencement No.2) Order 1999 (S.I. 1999 No. 1009 (C. 28))
- The High Court and County Courts (Allocation of Arbitration Proceedings) (Amendment) Order 1999 (S.I. 1999 No. 1010)
- The Civil Courts (Amendment) (No. 2) Order 1999 (S.I. 1999 No. 1011)
- The Family Proceedings (Miscellaneous Amendments) Rules 1999 (S.I. 1999 No. 1012 (L. 9))
- The Contracting Out of Functions (Court Staff) Order 1999 (S.I. 1999 No. 1013)
- The High Court and County Courts Jurisdiction (Amendment) Order 1999 (S.I. 1999 No. 1014)
- The Non-Contentious Probate (Amendment) Rules 1999 (S.I. 1999 No. 1015 (L. 10))
- The School Standards and Framework Act 1998 (Commencement No. 6 and Saving and Transitional Provisions) Order 1999 (S.I. 1999 No. 1016 (C.29))
- The Scotland Act 1998 (Transitory and Transitional Provisions) (Removal of Judges) Order 1999 (S.I. 1999 No. 1017)
- The Home Energy Efficiency Scheme (Amendment) (Scotland) Regulations 1999 (S.I. 1999 No. 1018 (S. 72))
- The Civil Legal Aid (Financial Conditions) (Scotland) Regulations 1999 (S.I. 1999 No. 1019 (S. 73))
- The Advice and Assistance (Financial Conditions) (Scotland) Regulations 1999 (S.I. 1999 No. 1020 (S. 74))
- The Court Funds (Amendment) Rules 1999 (S.I. 1999 No. 1021 (L. 11))
- The Insolvency (Amendment) (No. 2) Rules 1999 (S.I. 1999 No. 1022)
- The Insolvent Companies (Disqualification of Unfit Directors) Proceedings (Amendment) Rules 1999 (S.I. 1999 No. 1023)
- The Health Authorities (England) Establishment Order 1996 Amendment and the Cambridgeshire and Norfolk Health Authorities (Establishment etc.) (Amendment) Order 1999 (S.I. 1999 No. 1024)
- The Highways (Road Humps) Regulations 1999 (S.I. 1999 No. 1025)
- The Highways (Traffic Calming) Regulations 1999 (S.I. 1999 No. 1026)
- The Social Security Contributions (Decisions and Appeals) Regulations 1999 (S.I. 1999 No. 1027)
- The Professions Supplementary to Medicine (Registration Rules) (Amendment) Order of Council 1999 (S.I. 1999 No. 1028)
- The Personal Portfolio Bonds (Tax) Regulations 1999 (S.I. 1999 No. 1029)
- The Scotland Act 1998 (Consequential Modifications) (No.1) Order 1999 (S.I. 1999 No. 1042)
- The North Western and North Wales Sea Fisheries District Order 1999 (S.I. 1999 No. 1043)
- The Prescription Only Medicines (Human Use) Amendment Order 1999 (S.I. 1999 No. 1044)
- The Social Security Administration (Fraud) Act 1997 (Commencement No. 7) Order 1999 (S.I. 1999 No. 1046 (C. 29))
- The Child Support (Miscellaneous Amendments) (No. 2) Regulations 1999 (S.I. 1999 No. 1047)
- The Street Works Register (Registration Fees) Regulations 1999 (S.I. 1999 No. 1048)
- The Street Works (Registers, Notices, Directions and Designations) (Amendment) Regulations 1999 (S.I. 1999 No. 1049)
- The South Downs Health National Health Service Trust (Establishment) Amendment Order 1999 (S.I. 1999 No. 1052)
- The Non-Road Mobile Machinery (Emission of Gaseous and Particulate Pollutants) Regulations 1999 (S.I. 1999 No. 1053)
- The Non-Road Mobile Machinery (Type Approval) (Fees) Regulations 1999 (S.I. 1999 No. 1054)
- The Social Security Act 1998 (Commencement No. 6) Order 1999 (S.I. 1999 No. 1055 (C. 30))
- The National Savings Bank (Investment Deposits) (Limits) (Amendment) Order 1999 (S.I. 1999 No. 1056)
- The National Health Service (General Medical Services) (Scotland) Amendment (No.2) Regulations 1999 (S.I. 1999 No. 1057 (S. 75))
- The Right to Time Off for Study or Training (Scotland) Regulations 1999 (S.I. 1999 No. 1058 (S. 76))
- The Education (Assisted Places) (Scotland) Amendment Regulations 1999 (S.I. 1999 No. 1059 (S. 77))
- The St Mary's Music School (Aided Places) Amendment Regulations 1999 (S.I. 1999 No. 1060 (S. 78))
- The A720 (Edinburgh City Bypass) Special Road (Prohibition of Traffic On Hard Shoulders) Regulations 1999 (S.I. 1999 No. 1061 (S. 79))
- The Merchant Shipping (Fees) (Amendment) Regulations 1999 (S.I. 1999 No. 1063)
- The School Standards and Framework Act 1998 (Admissions and Standard Numbers) (Modification) Regulations 1999 (S.I. 1999 No. 1064)
- The Education (Induction Arrangements for School Teachers) (England) Regulations 1999 (S.I. 1999 No. 1065)
- The Education (Information as to Provision of Education) (England) Regulations 1999 (S.I. 1999 No. 1066)
- The Food Protection (Emergency Prohibitions) (Paralytic Shellfish Poisoning) (No.2) Order 1998 Partial Revocation (No.2) Order 1999 (S.I. 1999 No. 1067)
- The Highland Primary Care National Health Service Trust (Establishment) Amendment Order 1999 (S.I. 1999 No. 1069 (S. 80))
- The National Health Service Trusts (Dissolution) (Scotland) Order 1999 (S.I. 1999 No. 1070 (S. 81))
- The Lothian University Hospitals National Health Service Trust (Establishment) Amendment Order 1999 (S.I. 1999 No. 1071 (S. 82))
- The Police (Conduct) (Scotland) Amendment Regulations 1999 (S.I. 1999 No. 1072 (S. 83))
- The Registered Housing Associations (Accounting Requirements) (Scotland) Order 1999 (S.I. 1999 No. 1073 (S. 84))
- The Police (Conduct) (Senior Officers) (Scotland) Regulations 1999 (S.I. 1999 No. 1074 (S. 85))
- The Road Traffic (NHS Charges) Act 1999(Commencement No. 1) Order 1999 (S.I. 1999 No. 1075 (C. 31))
- The Motorways Traffic (M621 Motorway) Regulations 1999 (S.I. 1999 No. 1077)
- The Education (Lower Primary Class Sizes) (Scotland) Regulations 1999 (S.I. 1999 No. 1080 (S. 86))
- The Scotland Act 1998 (Transitory and Transitional Provisions) (Grants to Members and Officeholders) Order 1999 (S.I. 1999 No. 1081)
- The Scotland Act 1998 (Transitory and Transitional Provisions) (Scottish Parliamentary Pension Scheme) Order 1999 (S.I. 1999 No. 1082)
- The National Assembly for Wales (Assembly Members) (Salaries) (Limitation) Order 1999 (S.I. 1999 No. 1083)
- The Local Authorities (Direct Labour Organisations) (Competition) (Wales) (Amendment) Regulations 1999 (S.I. 1999 No. 1084)
- The Fees in the Registers of Scotland Amendment Order 1999 (S.I. 1999 No. 1085 (S. 87))
- The Local Authorities (Members' Allowances) (Amendment) Regulations 1999 (S.I. 1999 No. 1086)
- The Local Authorities (Members' Allowances) (Amendment) (No. 2) Regulations 1999 (S.I. 1999 No. 1087)
- The Social Security (Incapacity, Earnings and Work Trials) Pilot Schemes Regulations 1999 (S.I. 1999 No. 1088)
- The Plant Breeders' Rights (Fees) (Amendment) Regulations 1999 (S.I. 1999 No. 1089)
- The Seeds (National Lists of Varieties) (Fees) (Amendment) Regulations 1999 (S.I. 1999 No. 1090)
- The A13 Trunk Road (Tower Hamlets) Red Route Experimental Traffic Order 1998 Experimental Variation Order 1999 (S.I. 1999 No. 1091)
- The Patents (Amendment) Rules 1999 (S.I. 1999 No. 1092)
- The Patents (Fees) (Amendment) Rules 1999 (S.I. 1999 No. 1093)
- The Scottish Parliamentary Elections (Returning Officers' Charges) Order 1999 (S.I. 1999 No. 1094)
- The Scotland Act 1998 (Transitory and Transitional Provisions)(Standing Orders and Parliamentary Publications) Order 1999 (S.I. 1999 No. 1095)
- The Scotland Act 1998 (Transitory and Transitional Provisions) (Statutory Instruments) Order 1999 (S.I. 1999 No. 1096)
- The Scotland Act 1998 (Transitory and Transitional Provisions)(Salaries and Allowances) Order 1999 (S.I. 1999 No. 1097)
- The Scotland Act 1998 (Transitory and Transitional Provisions) (Administration of the Parliament) Order 1999 (S.I. 1999 No. 1098)
- The Education (Nursery Education and Early Years Development) (Wales) Regulations 1999 (S.I. 1999 No. 1099)
- The Welsh Language Schemes (Public Bodies) Order 1999 (S.I. 1999 No. 1100)

== 1101–1200 ==
- The National Assembly for Wales (Oath of Allegiance in Welsh) Order 1999 (S.I. 1999 No.1101)
- The Sex Discrimination (Gender Reassignment) Regulations 1999 (S.I. 1999 No. 1102)
- The Bovines and Bovine Products (Trade) Regulations 1999 (S.I. 1999 No. 1103)
- The Transfer of Property etc. (Scottish Ministers) Order 1999 (S.I. 1999 No. 1104)
- The Transfer of Property etc. (Lord Advocate) Order 1999 (S.I. 1999 No. 1105)
- The Transfer of Property etc. (Scottish Parliamentary Corporate Body) Order 1999 (S.I. 1999 No. 1106)
- The Environment Act 1995 (Consequential Amendment) Regulations 1999 (S.I. 1999 No. 1108)
- The Pesticides (Maximum Residue Levels in Crops, Food and Feeding Stuffs) (Amendment) Regulations 1999 (S.I. 1999 No. 1109)
- The Fish Producers' Organisations (Formation Grants) Regulations 1999 (S.I. 1999 No. 1110)
- The District Salmon Fishery Boards Order 1999 (S.I. 1999 No. 1111 (S. 90))
- The Road Traffic (Permitted Parking Area and Special Parking Area) (County of East Sussex) (Borough of Hastings) Order 1999 (S.I. 1999 No. 1112)
- The Civil Legal Aid (General) (Amendment) Regulations 1999 (S.I. 1999 No. 1113)
- The Argyll and Clyde Acute Hospitals National Health Service Trust (Establishment) Amendment Order 1999 (S.I. 1999 No. 1115 (S. 88))
- The Parole Board (Scotland) Amendment Rules 1999 (S.I. 1999 No. 1116 (S. 89))
- The London Cab Order 1999 (S.I. 1999 No. 1117)
- The Cardiff and District Community National Health Service Trust (Establishment) Order 1999 (S.I. 1999 No. 1118)
- The University Hospital of Wales and Llandough Hospital National Health Service Trust (Establishment) Order 1999 (S.I. 1999 No. 1119)
- The National Health Service Trusts (Wales) (Dissolution) Order 1999 (S.I. 1999 No. 1120)
- The Education (Chief Inspector of Schools in England) Order 1999 (S.I. 1999 No. 1121)
- The Education (Inspectors of Schools in England) Order 1999 (S.I. 1999 No. 1122)
- The Air Navigation (Fourth Amendment) Order 1999 (S.I. 1999 No. 1123)
- The Consular Relations (Merchant Shipping) (Union of Soviet Socialist Republics) (Revocation) Order 1999 (S.I. 1999 No. 1124)
- The International Mobile Satellite Organisation (Immunities and Privileges) Order 1999 (S.I. 1999 No. 1125)
- Scottish Adjacent Waters Boundaries Order 1999 (S.I. 1999 No. 1126)
- The Scottish Administration (Offices) Order 1999 (S.I. 1999 No. 1127)
- The National Minimum Wage (Offshore Employment) Order 1999 (S.I. 1999 No. 1128)
- The Education (Inspectors of Schools in Wales (No. 2) Order 1999 (S.I. 1999 No. 1129)
- The Students' Allowances (Scotland) Regulations 1999 (S.I. 1999 No. 1131 (S. 91))
- The Health Boards (Membership and Procedure) (No.2) Amendment Regulations 1999 (S.I. 1999 No. 1132 (S.92))
- The National Health Service Trusts (Membership and Procedure) (Scotland) Amendment Regulations 1999 (S.I. 1999 No. 1133 (S.93))
- The National Health Service Trusts (Appointment of Trustees) (Scotland) Order 1999 (S.I. 1999 No. 1134 (S. 94))
- The Housing (Right to Acquire) (Discount) Order 1999 (S.I. 1999 No. 1135)
- The Miscellaneous Food Additives (Amendment) Regulations 1999 (S.I. 1999 No. 1136)
- The Public Offers of Securities (Amendment) (No. 2) Regulations 1999 (S.I. 1999 No. 1146)
- A4 Trunk Road (Hammersmith & Fulham and Kensington & Chelsea) Red Route Traffic Order 1999 (S.I. 1999 No. 1147)
- The Water Supply (Water Fittings) Regulations 1999 (S.I. 1999 No. 1148)
- The Magistrates' Courts (Forms) (Amendment) Rules 1999 (S.I. 1999 No. 1149 (L. 12))
- The Offshore Installations (Safety Zones) (No. 2) Order 1999 (S.I. 1999 No. 1150)
- The Northern Ireland (Emergency Provisions) Act 1996 (Code of Practice) Order 1999 (S.I. 1999 No. 1151)
- The Northern Ireland (Sentences) Act 1998 (Specified Organisations) Order 1999 (S.I. 1999 No. 1152)
- The Income Support (General) (Standard Interest Rate Amendment) (No. 4) Regulations 1999 (S.I. 1999 No. 1153)
- The City of Edinburgh (Guided Busways) Order (Section 51) Order 1999 (S.I. 1999 No. 1154 (S. 95))
- The Southend Community Care Services National Health Service Trust (Establishment) Amendment Order 1999 (S.I. 1999 No. 1167)
- The St George's Healthcare National Health Service Trust (Establishment) Amendment Order 1999 (S.I. 1999 No. 1168)
- The South Birmingham Mental Health National Health Service Trust (Establishment) Amendment Order 1999 (S.I. 1999 No. 1169)
- The Lerwick Harbour Revision Order 1999 (S.I. 1999 No. 1170)
- The Northern Ireland (Emergency Provisions) Act 1996 (Audio Recording of Interviews) Order 1999 (S.I. 1999 No. 1172)
- The Countryside Access (Amendment) Regulations 1999 (S.I. 1999 No. 1174)
- The Environmentally Sensitive Areas (Wales) Designation Orders (Amendment) Order 1999 (S.I. 1999 No. 1175)
- The Land in Care Scheme (Tir Gofal) (Wales) Regulations 1999 (S.I. 1999 No. 1176)
- The Countryside Stewardship (Amendment) Regulations 1999 (S.I. 1999 No. 1177)
- The Education (School Performance Information) (England) Regulations 1999 (S.I. 1999 No. 1178)
- The Beef Special Premium (Amendment) Regulations 1999 (S.I. 1999 No. 1179)
- The Scottish Criminal Cases Review Commission (Application to Summary Proceedings) Order 1999 (S.I. 1999 No. 1181 (S. 96)])
- The Local Government Act 1988 (Defined Activities) (Exemptions) (Aylesbury Vale District Council and Thanet District Council) Order 1999 (S.I. 1999 No. 1185)
- The M606/M62 Motorways (Bradford Link) (Speed Limit) Regulations 1999 (S.I. 1999 No. 1187)
- The Education (Baseline Assessment) (Wales) Regulations 1999 (S.I. 1999 No. 1188)
- The Criminal Justice Act 1993 (Commencement No. 10) Order 1999 (S.I. 1999 No. 1189 (C. 32))
- The Disability Discrimination Act 1995 (Commencement Order No. 6) Order 1999 (S.I. 1999 No. 1190 (c. 33))
- The Disability Discrimination (Services and Premises) Regulations 1999 (S.I. 1999 No. 1191)
- The Food Protection (Emergency Prohibitions) (Amnesic Shellfish Poisoning) Order 1999 Revocation Order 1999 (S.I. 1999 No. 1192)
- The Swansea-Manchester Trunk Road (A483) (South of Welshpool Bypass Detrunking) Order 1999 (S.I. 1999 No. 1196)
- The Magistrates' Courts (Procedure) Act 1998 (Commencement No. 2) Order 1999 (S.I. 1999 No. 1197 (C. 34))

== 1201–1300 ==
- The A1 Trunk Road (Barnet) Red Route (Speed Limit) Experimental Traffic Order 1999 (S.I. 1999 No. 1203)
- The Traffic Areas (Reorganisation) (Wales) Order 1999 (S.I. 1999 No. 1204)
- The Road Traffic (Parking Adjudicators) (London) (Amendment) Regulations 1999 (S.I. 1999 No. 1205)
- The Social Landlords (Additional Purposes or Objects) (No. 2) Order 1999 (S.I. 1999 No. 1206)
- The Exchange of Securities (General) (Amendment) Rules 1999 (S.I. 1999 No. 1207)
- The Stock Transfer (Gilt-edged Securities) (CGO Service) (Amendment) Regulations 1999 (S.I. 1999 No. 1208)
- The Financial Markets and Insolvency (CGO Service) Regulations 1999 (S.I. 1999 No. 1209)
- The Stock Transfer (Gilt-edged Securities) (Exempt Transfer) (Amendment) Regulations 1999 (S.I. 1999 No. 1210)
- The General Optical Council (Education Committee Rules) Order of Council 1999 (S.I. 1999 No. 1211)
- The Local Government Pension Scheme (Miscellaneous Provisions) Regulations 1999 (S.I. 1999 No. 1212)
- The Housing (Preservation of Right to Buy) (Amendment) Regulations 1999 (S.I. 1999 No. 1213)
- The European Parliamentary Elections Regulations 1999 (S.I. 1999 No. 1214)
- The Building Societies (Merger Notification Statement) Regulations 1999 (S.I. 1999 No. 1215)
- The Civil Procedure (Modification of Enactments) Order 1999 (S.I. 1999 No. 1217)
- The Luton and Dunstable Hospital National Health Service Trust (Establishment) Amendment Order 1999 (S.I. 1999 No. 1218)
- Act of Sederunt (Rules of the Court of Session Amendment No. 3) (External Orders Affecting Proceeds of Crime) 1999 (S.I. 1999 No. 1220 (S.97))
- The Lay Representatives (Rights of Audience) Order 1999 (S.I. 1999 No. 1225)
- The Recreation Grounds (Revocation of Parish Council Byelaws) Order 1999 (S.I. 1999 No. 1227)
- The Plant Protection Products (Amendment) Regulations 1999 (S.I. 1999 No. 1228)
- The Social Security Revaluation of Earnings Factors Order 1999 (S.I. 1999 No. 1235)
- The Education (National Curriculum) (Key Stage 1 Assessment Arrangements) (England) Order 1999 (S.I. 1999 No. 1236)
- The Rail Vehicle Accessibility (Midland Metro T69 Vehicles) (Exemption No. 2) Order 1999 (S.I. 1999 No. 1256)
- The Gaming Clubs (Hours and Charges) (Amendment) Regulations 1999 (S.I. 1999 No. 1258)
- The Amusements with Prizes (Variation of Monetary Limits) Order 1999 (S.I. 1999 No. 1259)
- The Gaming Act (Variation of Monetary Limits) Order 1999 (S.I. 1999 No. 1260)
- The Federal Republic of Yugoslavia (Supply, Sale and Export of Petroleum and Petroleum Products) (Penalties and Licences) Regulations 1999 (S.I. 1999 No. 1261)
- The A3220 Trunk Road (Kensington & Chelsea and Hammersmith & Fulham) Red Route Traffic Order 1999 (S.I. 1999 No. 1264)
- The Secure Remands and Committals (Prescribed Description of Children and Young Persons) Order 1999 (S.I. 1999 No. 1265)
- The National Crime Squad (Complaints) (Amendment) Regulations 1999 (S.I. 1999 No. 1266)
- The Local Government (Publication of Staffing Information) (England) (Revocation) Regulations 1999 (S.I. 1999 No. 1267)
- The European Parliamentary Elections (Northern Ireland) (Amendment) Regulations 1999 (S.I. 1999 No. 1268)
- The NCIS (Complaints) (Amendment) Regulations 1999 (S.I. 1999 No. 1273)
- The National Health Service (Clinical Negligence Scheme) (Amendment) Regulations 1999 (S.I. 1999 No. 1274)
- The National Health Service (Existing Liabilities Scheme) (Amendment) Regulations 1999 (S.I. 1999 No. 1275)
- The Warehousekeepers and Owners of Warehoused Goods Regulations 1999 (S.I. 1999 No.1278)
- The Crime and Disorder Act 1998 (Commencement No. 4) Order 1999 (S.I. 1999 No. 1279 (C. 36))
- The Criminal Justice Act 1991 (Commencement No. 3) (Amendment) Order 1999 (S.I. 1999 No. 1280 (C. 37))
- Act of Sederunt (Rules of the Court of Session Amendment No. 4) (References to the Court of Justice of the European Communities) 1999 (S.I. 1999 No. 1281 (S.98))
- Act of Adjournal (Criminal Procedure Rules Amendment No. 2) 1999 (S.I. 1999 No. 1282 (S.99))
- The Education (Funding for Teacher Training) Designation Order 1999 (S.I. 1999 No. 1283)
- The Durham College of Agriculture and Horticulture (Dissolution) Order 1999 (S.I. 1999 No. 1284)
- The East Durham Community College (Dissolution) Order 1999 (S.I. 1999 No. 1285)
- The Education (Adjudicators Inquiry Procedure etc.) Regulations 1999 (S.I. 1999 No. 1286)
- The Education (Head Teachers) Regulations 1999 (S.I. 1999 No. 1287)
- The Road Traffic (Permitted Parking Area and Special Parking Area) (County Borough of Neath Port Talbot) Order 1999 (S.I. 1999 No. 1288)
- The Pembrokeshire (Llangwm and Hook Community) Order 1999 (S.I. 1999 No. 1289)
- The Government of Wales Act 1998 (Commencement No. 5) Order 1999 (S.I. 1999 No. 1290 (C. 38))

== 1301–1400 ==
- The Environment Act 1995 (Commencement No. 15) Order 1999 (S.I. 1999 No. 1301 (C. 39))
- The Social Security (Adjudication) (Amendment) Regulations 1999 (S.I. 1999 No. 1302)
- The Registration of Births, Deaths and Marriages (Fees) (Amendment) Order 1999 (S.I. 1999 No. 1303)
- The Child Support Commissioners (Procedure) Regulations 1999 (S.I. 1999 No. 1305)
- The Wirral Tramway Order 1999 (S.I. 1999 No. 1306)
- The Housing (Right to Acquire or Enfranchise) (Designated Rural Areas) Order 1999 (S.I. 1999 No. 1307)
- The Chiropractors Act 1994 (Commencement No. 2) Order 1999 (S.I. 1999 No. 1309 (C. 40))
- The Carriage by Air Acts (Implementation of Protocol No. 4 of Montreal, 1975) Order 1999 (S.I. 1999 No. 1312)
- The Carriage by Air (Parties to Convention) Order 1999 (S.I. 1999 No. 1313)
- The Broadcasting (Guernsey) Order 1999 (S.I. 1999 No.1314)
- The Broadcasting (Jersey) Order 1999 (S.I. 1999 No. 1315)
- The Geneva Conventions Act (Guernsey) Order 1999 (S.I. 1999 No. 1316)
- The Women Priests (Channel Islands) Order 1999 (S.I. 1999 No. 1317)
- The Reciprocal Enforcement of Maintenance Orders (Hague Convention Countries) (Variation) Order 1999 (S.I. 1999 No. 1318)
- The Scotland Act 1998 (Cross-Border Public Authorities)(Specification) Order 1999 (S.I. 1999 No. 1319)
- The Judicial Committee (Powers in Devolution Cases) Order 1999 (S.I. 1999 No. 1320)
- The Swansea (1999) National Health Service Trust (Change of Name) Order 1999 (S.I. 1999 No. 1321)
- The Public Service Vehicles (Community Licences) Regulations 1999 (S.I. 1999 No. 1322)
- The Rules of the Air (Amendment) Regulations 1999 (S.I. 1999 No. 1323)
- The Air Navigation (General) (Second Amendment) Regulations 1999 (S.I. 1999 No. 1324)
- The Cambridgeshire (Coroners' Districts) (Amendment) Order 1999 (S.I. 1999 No. 1325)
- The Social Security (Hospital In-Patients, Attendance Allowance and Disability Living Allowance) (Amendment) Regulations 1999 (S.I. 1999 No. 1326)
- The Harrow College (Incorporation) Order 1999 (S.I. 1999 No.1327)
- The Harrow College (Government) Regulations 1999 (S.I. 1999 No. 1328)
- The Education (Nursery Education and Early Years Development) (England) Regulations 1999 (S.I. 1999 No. 1329)
- The Scotland Act 1998 (General Transitory, Transitional and Savings Provisions) Amendment Order 1999 (S.I. 1999 No. 1334)
- The Cattle Identification (Amendment) Regulations 1999 (S.I. 1999 No. 1339)
- The European Parliamentary Elections (Returning Officer's Charges) (Northern Ireland) Order 1999 (S.I. 1999 No. 1342)
- The Magistrates' Courts (Children and Young Persons) (Amendment) Rules 1999 (S.I. 1999 No. 1343 (L. 13))
- Act of Sederunt (Devolution Issues Rules) 1999 (S.I. 1999 No. 1345 (S.100))
- Act of Adjournal (Devolution Issues Rules) 1999 (S.I. 1999 No. 1346 (S.101))
- Act of Sederunt (Proceedings for Determination of Devolution Issues Rules) 1999 (S.I. 1999 No. 1347 (S.102))
- The Scotland Act 1998 (Transitory and Transitional Provisions) (Members' Interests) Order 1999 (S.I. 1999 No. 1350)
- The Scotland Act 1998 (Transitory and Transitional Provisions) (Complaints of Maladministration) Order 1999 (S.I. 1999 No. 1351)
- The Election Petition (Amendment) Rules 1999 (S.I. 1999 No. 1352 (L. 14))
- The Port of London Authority Harbour Revision Order 1999 (S.I. 1999 No. 1353)
- The A406 Trunk Road (Barnet) Red Route (Clearway) Traffic Order 1996 Variation Order 1999 (S.I. 1999 No. 1359)
- The Food Safety (General Food Hygiene) (Amendment) Regulations 1999 (S.I. 1999 No. 1360)
- The Producer Responsibility Obligations (Packaging Waste) (Amendment) Regulations 1999 (S.I. 1999 No. 1361)
- The Social Security (Overlapping Benefits) Amendment (No. 2) Regulations 1999 (S.I. 1999 No. 1362)
- The Environmentally Sensitive Areas (Lake District) Designation (Amendment) Order 1999 (S.I. 1999 No. 1363)
- The Environmentally Sensitive Areas (Breckland) Designation (Amendment) Order 1999 (S.I. 1999 No. 1364)
- The Environmentally Sensitive Areas (Test Valley) Designation (Amendment) Order 1999 (S.I. 1999 No. 1365)
- The Environmentally Sensitive Areas (North Kent Marshes) Designation (Amendment) Order 1999 (S.I. 1999 No. 1366)
- The Environmentally Sensitive Areas (North Peak) Designation (Amendment) Order 1999 (S.I. 1999 No. 1367)
- The Environmentally Sensitive Areas (Avon Valley) Designation (Amendment) Order 1999 (S.I. 1999 No. 1368)
- The Environmentally Sensitive Areas (Clun) Designation (Amendment) Order 1999 (S.I. 1999 No. 1369)
- The Environmentally Sensitive Areas (South Wessex Downs) Designation (Amendment) Order 1999 (S.I. 1999 No. 1370)
- The Environmentally Sensitive Areas (Exmoor) Designation (Amendment) Order 1999 (S.I. 1999 No. 1371)
- The Environmentally Sensitive Areas (Suffolk River Valleys) Designation (Amendment) Order 1999 (S.I. 1999 No. 1372)
- The European Specialist Medical Qualifications Amendment Regulations 1999 (S.I. 1999 No. 1373)
- The Value Added Tax (Amendment) (No.3) Regulations 1999 (S.I. 1999 No. 1374)
- The Legal Aid in Criminal and Care Proceedings (Costs) (Amendment) (No. 2) Regulations 1999 (S.I. 1999 No. 1375)
- The Council of the City of York (Millennium Bridge) Scheme 1998 Confirmation Instrument 1999 (S.I. 1999 No. 1376)
- The European Parliamentary Elections (Local Returning Officers' Charges) Order 1999 (S.I. 1999 No. 1377)
- The European Parliamentary Elections (Returning Officers' Charges) Order 1999 (S.I. 1999 No. 1378)
- The Scotland Act 1998 (Transitory and Transitional Provisions) (Publication and Interpretation etc. of Acts of the Scottish Parliament) Order 1999 (S.I. 1999 No. 1379)
- The North and West Salmon Fishery District Designation Order 1999 (S.I. 1999 No. 1380 (S. 103))
- The Conon Salmon Fishery District Designation Order 1999 (S.I. 1999 No. 1381 (S. 104))
- The Lochaber Salmon Fishery District Designation Order 1999 (S.I. 1999 No. 1382 (S. 105))
- The Pathfinder National Health Service Trust (Change of Name) Order 1999 (S.I. 1999 No. 1384)
- The Education (Al-Furqan Primary School, Tyseley) (Exemption from Pay and Conditions) Order 1999 (S.I. 1999 No. 1385)
- Act of Sederunt (Rules of the Court of Session Amendment No. 5) (Miscellaneous) 1999 (S.I. 1999 No. 1386 (S.106))
- Act of Adjournal (Criminal Procedure Rules Amendment No. 3) 1999 (S.I. 1999 No. 1387 (S.107))
- The Walsgrave Hospitals National Health Service Trust (Establishment) Amendment Order 1999 (S.I. 1999 No. 1392)
- The European Parliamentary Election Petition (Amendment) Rules 1999 (S.I. 1999 No. 1398 (L. 15))

== 1401–1500 ==
- The European Parliamentary Elections (Welsh Forms) (Amendment) Order 1999 (S.I. 1999 No. 1402)
- The Misuse of Drugs (Safe Custody) (Amendment) Regulations 1999 (S.I. 1999 No. 1403)
- The Misuse of Drugs (Amendment) Regulations 1999 (S.I. 1999 No. 1404)
- The Local Government Act 1988 (Defined Activities) (Exemption) (Tower Hamlets London Borough Council) Order 1999 (S.I. 1999 No. 1405)
- The Education (Governors' Annual Reports) (Wales) Regulations 1999 (S.I. 1999 No. 1406)
- The Education (Annual Parents' Meetings) (Wales) Regulations 1999 (S.I. 1999 No. 1407)
- The Non-resident Companies (General Insurance Business) Regulations 1999 (S.I. 1999 No. 1408)
- The Local Authority (Stocks and Bonds) (Amendment) Regulations 1999 (S.I. 1999 No. 1409)
- The Government Stock (Amendment) Regulations 1999 (S.I. 1999 No. 1410)
- The Income Support (General) (Standard Interest Rate Amendment) (No. 5) Regulations 1999 (S.I. 1999 No. 1411)
- The Civil Aviation (Navigation Services Charges) (Third Amendment) Regulations 1999 (S.I. 1999 No. 1412)
- The Potato Industry Development Council (Amendment) Order 1999 (S.I. 1999 No. 1413)
- The Radcliffe Infirmary National Health Service Trust (Dissolution) Order 1999 (S.I. 1999 No. 1414)
- The Police (Secretary of State's Objectives) (No. 2) Order 1999 (S.I. 1999 No. 1415)
- The M32 Motorway (Hambrook Interchange to Lower Ashley Road Interchange) and Connecting Roads Scheme 1989 (Variation) Scheme 1999 (S.I. 1999 No. 1416)
- The Unfair Dismissal and Statement of Reasons for Dismissal (Variation of Qualifying Period) Order 1999 (S.I. 1999 No. 1436)
- The Northern Ireland (Location of Victims' Remains) Act 1999 (Immunities and Privileges) Order 1999 (S.I. 1999 No. 1437)
- The Protection of Wrecks (Designation) Order 1999 (S.I. 1999 No.1438)
- The Education Development Plans (Wales) Regulations 1999 (S.I. 1999 No. 1439)
- The Education (School Inspection) (Wales) (Amendment) Regulations 1999 (S.I. 1999 No. 1440)
- The Education (Inspection of Nursery Education) (Wales) Regulations 1999 (S.I. 1999 No. 1441)
- The Education (Special Educational Needs) (Information) (Wales) Regulations 1999 (S.I. 1999 No. 1442)
- The Railways Act 1993 (Consequential Modifications) Order 1999 (S.I. 1999 No. 1443)
- The Rail Vehicle Accessibility (LTS Rail Class 357 Vehicles) Exemption Order 1999 (S.I. 1999 No. 1448)
- The A30 Trunk Road (Woodleigh Junction Slip Roads) Order 1999 (S.I. 1999 No. 1451)
- The Aeroplane Noise Regulations 1999 (S.I. 1999 No. 1452)
- The Judicial Pensions and Retirement Act 1993 (Addition of Qualifying Judicial Offices) Order 1999 (S.I. 1999 No. 1454)
- The Social Security and Child Support (Decisions and Appeals) (Amendment) Regulations 1999 (S.I. 1999 No. 1466)
- The Stamp Duty and Stamp Duty Reserve Tax (Open-ended Investment Companies) (Amendment) Regulations 1999 (S.I. 1999 No. 1467)
- The Horserace Betting Levy (Bookmakers' Committee) Regulations 1999 (S.I. 1999 No. 1468)
- The Education (Schedule 32 to the School Standards and Framework Act 1998) (Wales) Regulations 1999 (S.I. 1999 No. 1469)
- The Education (School Performance Information) (Wales) (Amendment) Regulations 1999 (S.I. 1999 No. 1470)
- The A1 Trunk Road (Islington) Red Route Traffic Order 1993 Variation Order (No. 2) 1999 (S.I. 1999 No. 1475)
- The A1 Trunk Road (Islington) Red Route (Bus Priority) Traffic Order 1999 (S.I. 1999 No. 1476)
- The Adoption (Amendment) Rules 1999 (S.I. 1999 No. 1477 (L. 16))
- The Food Labelling (Amendment) (No. 2) Regulations 1999 (S.I. 1999 No. 1483)
- The A1 Trunk Road (Islington) (Temporary Prohibition of Traffic) Order 1999 (S.I. 1999 No. 1484)
- The A50 Trunk Road (Uttoxeter Service Area, Staffordshire) Order 1999 (S.I. 1999 No. 1492)
- The M32 Motorway (Junction Two, Northbound Exit Slip Road, Special Road) (Detrunking) Order 1999 (S.I. 1999 No. 1493)
- The Education (Mandatory Awards) Regulations 1999 (S.I. 1999 No. 1494)
- The Social Security Commissioners (Procedure) Regulations 1999 (S.I. 1999 No. 1495)
- The Chiropractors Act 1994 (Commencement No. 3) Order 1999 (S.I. 1999 No. 1496 (C. 41))
- The Education (Individual Pupils' Achievements) (Information) (Wales) (Amendment) Regulations 1999 (S.I. 1999 No. 1497)
- The School Standards and Framework Act 1998 (Appointed Day) (Wales) Order 1999 (S.I. 1999 No. 1498 (C. 46))
- The Criminal Justice Act 1993 (Commencement No. 11) Order 1999 (S.I. 1999 No. 1499 (C. 42))

== 1501–1600 ==
- The Foundation Body Regulations 1999 (S.I. 1999 No. 1502)
- The Education (Grants) (Music, Ballet and Choir Schools) (Amendment) Regulations 1999 (S.I. 1999 No. 1503)
- The Education (Assisted Places) (Amendment) Regulations 1999 (S.I. 1999 No. 1504)
- The Education (Assisted Places) (Incidental Expenses) (Amendment) Regulations 1999 (S.I. 1999 No. 1505)
- The Water Supply (Water Fittings) (Amendment) Regulations 1999 (S.I. 1999 No. 1506)
- The Combined Probation Areas (Humberside) Order 1999 (S.I. 1999 No. 1507)
- The Social Security Amendment (Non-Cash Vouchers) Regulations 1999 (S.I. 1999 No. 1509)
- The Social Security Act 1998 (Commencement No. 7 and Consequential and Transitional Provisions) Order 1999 (S.I. 1999 No. 1510 (C.43)])
- The Northern Ireland (Location of Victims' Remains) Act 1999 (Commencement of Section 2) Order 1999 (S.I. 1999 No. 1511 (C. 44)])
- The Scotland Act 1998 (Agency Arrangements) (Specification) Order 1999 (S.I. 1999 No. 1512)
- The Olive Oil (Designations of Origin) Regulations 1999 (S.I. 1999 No. 1513)
- The Smoke Control Areas (Exempted Fireplaces) Order 1999 (S.I. 1999 No. 1515)
- The Federal Republic of Yugoslavia (Supply, Sale and Export of Petroleum and Petroleum Products) (No. 2) Regulations 1999 (S.I. 1999 No. 1516)
- The Energy Information (Lamps) Regulations 1999 (S.I. 1999 No. 1517)
- The Road Vehicles (Construction and Use) (Amendment) Regulations 1999 (S.I. 1999 No. 1521)
- The Council Tax (Exempt Dwellings) (Amendment) (No. 2) Order 1999 (S.I. 1999 No. 1522)
- The Housing Renewal Grants (Amendment) Regulations 1999 (S.I. 1999 No. 1523)
- The Water Supply (Water Quality) (Amendment) Regulations 1999 (S.I. 1999 No. 1524)
- The Feeding Stuffs (Amendment) Regulations 1999 (S.I. 1999 No. 1528)
- The General Chiropractic Council (Constitution and Procedure) Rules Order 1999 (S.I. 1999 No. 1537)
- The Local Government Act 1988 (Defined Activities) (Exemptions) (Bournemouth, Harrogate, Poole and Worthing Borough Councils) Order 1999 (S.I. 1999 No. 1538)
- The Housing Benefit and Council Tax Benefit (General) Amendment (No.2) Regulations 1999 (S.I. 1999 No. 1539)
- The Natural Mineral Water, Spring Water and Bottled Drinking Water Regulations 1999 (S.I. 1999 No. 1540)
- The Relocation Grants (Form of Application) (Amendment) Regulations 1999 (S.I. 1999 No. 1541)
- The Food (Animals and Animal Products from Belgium) (Emergency Control) Order 1999 (S.I. 1999 No. 1542)
- The Animal Feedingstuffs from Belgium (Control) Regulations 1999 (S.I. 1999 No. 1543)
- The Civil Aviation (Route Charges for Navigation Services) (Third Amendment) Regulations 1999 (S.I. 1999 No. 1544)
- The National Assembly for Wales (Local Government (Contracts) Act 1997) (Modifications) Order 1999 (S.I. 1999 No. 1545)
- The Water and Sewerage Undertakers (Pipelaying and Other Works) (Code of Practice) Order 1999 (S.I. 1999 No. 1546)
- The Public Interest Disclosure Act 1998 (Commencement) Order 1999 (S.I. 1999 No. 1547 (C. 45)])
- The Public Interest Disclosure (Compensation) Regulations 1999 (S.I. 1999 No. 1548)
- The Public Interest Disclosure (Prescribed Persons) Order 1999 (S.I. 1999 No. 1549)
- The Cosmetic Products (Safety) (Amendment) Regulations 1999 (S.I. 1999 No. 1552)
- The Seeds (Fees) (Amendment) Regulations 1999 (S.I. 1999 No. 1553)
- The Bovines and Bovine Products (Trade) (Amendment) Regulations 1999 (S.I. 1999 No. 1554)
- The Railtrack (Luton Parkway Station: Land Acquisition) Order 1999 (S.I. 1999 No. 1555)
- The A638 Trunk Road (North Of Doncaster, Redhouse To County Boundary) (Detrunking) Order 1999 (S.I. 1999 No. 1556)
- The National Lottery etc. Act 1993 (Amendment of Section 23) Order 1999 (S.I. 1999 No. 1563)
- The Excise Goods (Sales on Board Ships and Aircraft) Regulations 1999 (S.I. 1999 No. 1565)
- The Value Added Tax (Chiropractors) Order 1999 (S.I. 1999 No. 1575)
- The Financial Services Act 1986 (Overseas Investment Exchanges and Overseas Clearing Houses) (Periodical Fees) Regulations 1999 (S.I. 1999 No. 1576)
- The Home-Grown Cereals Authority (Rate of Levy) Order 1999 (S.I. 1999 No. 1577)
- The Food Safety (Fishery Products and Live Shellfish) (Hygiene) Amendment (No. 2) Regulations 1999 (S.I. 1999 No. 1585)
- The Scotland Act 1998 (Concurrent Functions) Order 1999 (S.I. 1999 No. 1592)
- The Scotland Act 1998 (Transitory and Transitional Provisions) (Orders subject to Special Parliamentary Procedure) Order 1999 (S.I. 1999 No. 1593)
- The Scotland Act 1998 (Transitory and Transitional Provisions) (Laying of Reports) Order 1999 (S.I. 1999 No. 1594)
- The Scotland Act 1998 (Transitory and Transitional Provisions) (Complaints of Maladministration) Amendment Order 1999 (S.I. 1999 No. 1595)
- The Scotland Act 1998 (Transfer of Borrowing of the Registers of Scotland Executive Agency Trading Fund) Order 1999 (S.I. 1999 No. 1596)

== 1601–1700 ==
- The Goods Infringing Intellectual Property Rights (Customs) Regulations 1999 (S.I. 1999 No. 1601)
- The Contaminants in Food (Amendment) Regulations 1999 (S.I. 1999 No. 1603)
- The National Health Service (Indicative Amounts) (Amendment) Regulations 1999 (S.I. 1999 No. 1606)
- The Housing Renewal Grants (Prescribed Form and Particulars) (Amendment) Regulations 1999 (S.I. 1999 No. 1607)
- The Road Traffic Regulation Act 1984 (Amendment) Order 1999 (S.I. 1999 No. 1608)
- The Magistrates' Courts Committees (West Glamorgan and South Wales) Amalgamation Order 1999 (S.I. 1999 No. 1609)
- The Army Terms of Service (Amendment) Regulations 1999 (S.I. 1999 No. 1610)
- The National Savings Bank (Amendment) (No. 2) Regulations 1999 (S.I. 1999 No. 1611)
- The Public Record Office (Fees) (Amendment) Regulations 1999 (S.I. 1999 No. 1616)
- The Excise Duties (Personal Reliefs) (Amendment) Order 1999 (S.I. 1999 No. 1617)
- The Goods Infringing Intellectual Property Rights (Consequential Provisions) Regulations 1999 (S.I. 1999 No. 1618)
- The General Teaching Council for Wales (Constitution) Regulations 1999 (S.I. 1999 No. 1619)
- The National Health Service (General Medical Services) (Scotland) Amendment (No.3) Regulations 1999 (S.I. 1999 No. 1620 (S. 108)])
- The Registration of Marriages (Welsh Language) Regulations 1999 (S.I. 1999 No. 1621)
- The Welfare of Animals (Transport) (Amendment) Order 1999 (S.I. 1999 No. 1622)
- The Social Security and Child Support (Decisions and Appeals) Amendment (No. 2) Regulations 1999 (S.I. 1999 No. 1623)
- The National Health Service (General Medical Services) Amendment (No. 2) Regulations 1999 (S.I. 1999 No. 1627)
- The Public Telecommunication System Designation (Axxon Telecom Limited) Order 1999 (S.I. 1999 No. 1628)
- The Public Telecommunication System Designation (Cyberlight Europe Plc) Order 1999 (S.I. 1999 No. 1629)
- The Public Telecommunication System Designation (NTT Europe Limited) Order 1999 (S.I. 1999 No. 1630)
- The Public Telecommunication System Designation (Japan Telecom UK Limited) Order 1999 (S.I. 1999 No. 1631)
- The Public Telecommunication System Designation (Jersey Telecoms) Order 1999 (S.I. 1999 No. 1632)
- The Public Telecommunication System Designation (City Telecom (HK) Limited) Order 1999 (S.I. 1999 No. 1633)
- The Public Telecommunication System Designation (Alpha Telecom Limited) Order 1999 (S.I. 1999 No. 1634)
- The Public Telecommunication System Designation (International Optical Network Limited) Order 1999 (S.I. 1999 No. 1635)
- The Public Telecommunication System Designation (Belgacom UK Limited) Order 1999 (S.I. 1999 No. 1636)
- The Public Telecommunication System Designation (Call-Net (UK) Limited) Order 1999 (S.I. 1999 No. 1637)
- The Public Telecommunication System Designation (Flute Limited) Order 1999 (S.I. 1999 No. 1638)
- The Public Telecommunication System Designation (Zereau Limited) Order 1999 (S.I. 1999 No. 1639)
- The Public Telecommunication System Designation (Eurotunnel Telecommunications Limited) Order 1999 (S.I. 1999 No. 1640)
- The Driving Licences (Exchangeable Licences) Order 1999 (S.I. 1999 No. 1641)
- The Value Added Tax (Abolition of Zero-Rating for Tax-Free Shops) Order 1999 (S.I. 1999 No. 1642)
- The Insurance Companies (Loan Relationships) (Election for Accruals Basis) Order 1999 (S.I. 1999 No. 1643)
- The Merchant Shipping (Additional Safety Measures for Bulk Carriers) Regulations 1999 (S.I. 1999 No. 1644)
- The M6 Motorway (Junction 38 Slip Roads) (Speed Limit) Regulations 1999 (S.I. 1999 No. 1646)
- The Town and Country Planning (General Permitted Development) (Amendment) Order 1999 (S.I. 1999 No. 1661)
- The Social Security Contributions (Transfer of Functions, etc.) Act 1999 (Commencement No. 2 and Consequential and Transitional Provisions) Order 1999 (S.I. 1999 No. 1662 (C.47)])
- The Feeding Stuffs (Sampling and Analysis) Regulations 1999 (S.I. 1999 No. 1663)
- The Gateshead (Baltic Millennium Bridge) Order 1999 (S.I. 1999 No. 1664)
- The Local Government Officers (Political Restrictions) (Wales) (Amendment) Regulations 1999 (S.I. 1999 No. 1665)
- The Road Traffic (Permitted Parking Area and Special Parking Area) (Borough of Luton) (Amendment) Order 1999 (S.I. 1999 No. 1666)
- The Road Traffic (Permitted Parking Area and Special Parking Area) (County of Buckinghamshire) (High Wycombe Town Centre) (Amendment) Order 1999 (S.I. 1999 No. 1667)
- The Road Traffic (Permitted Parking Areas and Special Parking Areas) (City of Oxford and Parish of North Hinksey) (Amendment) Order 1999 (S.I. 1999 No. 1668)
- The Road Traffic (Permitted Parking Area and Special Parking Area) (County of Hertfordshire) (Borough of Watford) (Amendment) Order 1999 (S.I. 1999 No. 1669)
- The Social Security and Child Support (Decisions and Appeals) Amendment (No. 3) Regulations 1999 (S.I. 1999 No. 1670)
- The Education (School Organisation Proposals) (Wales) Regulations 1999 (S.I. 1999 No. 1671)
- The Public Gas Transporter Pipe-line Works (Environmental Impact Assessment) Regulations 1999 (S.I. 1999 No. 1672)
- The Energy Information (Dishwashers) Regulations 1999 (S.I. 1999 No. 1676)
- The Social Security Amendment (Educational Maintenance Allowance) Regulations 1999 (S.I. 1999 No. 1677)

== See also ==
- List of statutory instruments of the United Kingdom
