= English contract law =

Law of contracts in England and Wales

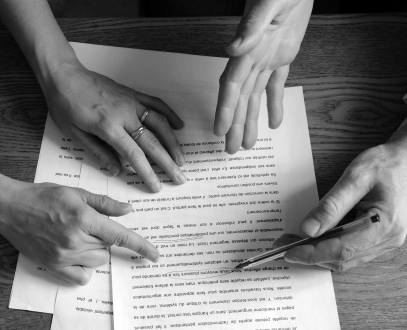
A contract is an agreement enforceable in court. Contract law regulates all sorts of transactions, from buying a tube ticket to computerised derivatives trading.

English contract law is the body of law that regulates legally binding agreements in England and Wales. With its roots in the lex mercatoria and the activism of the judiciary during the Industrial Revolution, it shares a heritage with countries across the Commonwealth (such as Australia, Canada, India). English contract law also draws influence from European Union law, from the United Kingdom's continuing membership in Unidroit and, to a lesser extent, from the United States.

A contract is a voluntary obligation, or set of voluntary obligations, which is enforceable by a court or tribunal. This contrasts with other areas of private law in which obligations arise as an operation of the law. For example, the law imposes a duty on individuals not to unlawfully constrain another's freedom of movement (false imprisonment) in the law of tort and the law says a person cannot hold property mistakenly transferred in the law of unjust enrichment. English law places great importance on making sure that individuals genuinely consent to the agreements that can be enforced in court, as long as those agreements comply with statutory requirements and Human Rights.

Generally, a contract is formed when one person makes an offer, and another person accepts it by communicating their assent or performing the offer's terms. If the terms are certain, and the parties can be presumed from their behaviour to have intended that the terms are binding, generally the agreement is enforceable. Some contracts, particularly for large transactions such as a sale of land, also require the formalities of signatures and witnesses and English law goes further than other European countries by requiring all parties bring something of value, known as "consideration", to a bargain as a precondition to enforce it. Contracts can be made personally or through an agent acting on behalf of a principal, if the agent acts within what a reasonable person would think they have the authority to do. In principle, English law grants people broad freedom to agree the content of a deal. Terms in an agreement are incorporated through express promises, by reference to other terms or potentially through a course of dealing between two parties. Those terms are interpreted by the courts to seek out the true intention of the parties, from the perspective of an objective observer, in the context of their bargaining environment. Where there is a gap, courts typically imply terms to fill the spaces, but also through the 20th century both the judiciary and legislature have intervened more and more to strike out surprising and unfair terms, particularly in favour of consumers, employees or tenants with weaker bargaining power.

Contract law works best when an agreement is performed, and recourse to the courts is never needed because each party knows their rights and duties. However, where an unforeseen event renders an agreement very hard, or even impossible to perform, the courts typically will construe the parties to want to have released themselves from their obligations. It may also be that one party simply breaches a contract's terms. If a contract is not substantially performed, then the innocent party is entitled to cease their own performance and sue for damages to put them in the position as if the contract were performed. They are under a duty to mitigate their own losses and cannot claim for harm that was a remote consequence of the contractual breach, but remedies in English law are footed on the principle that full compensation for all losses, pecuniary or not, should be made good. In exceptional circumstances, the law goes further to require a wrongdoer to make restitution for their gains from breaching a contract, and may demand specific performance of the agreement rather than monetary compensation. It is also possible that a contract becomes voidable, because, depending on the specific type of contract, one party failed to make adequate disclosure or they made misrepresentations during negotiations.

Unconscionable agreements can be escaped where a person was under duress or undue influence or their vulnerability was being exploited when they ostensibly agreed to a deal. Children, mentally incapacitated people, and companies whose representatives are acting wholly outside their authority, are protected against having agreements enforced against them where they lacked the real capacity to make a decision to enter an agreement. Some transactions are considered illegal, and are not enforced by courts because of a statute or on grounds of public policy. In theory, English law attempts to adhere to a principle that people should only be bound when they have given their informed and true consent to a contract.

== History ==
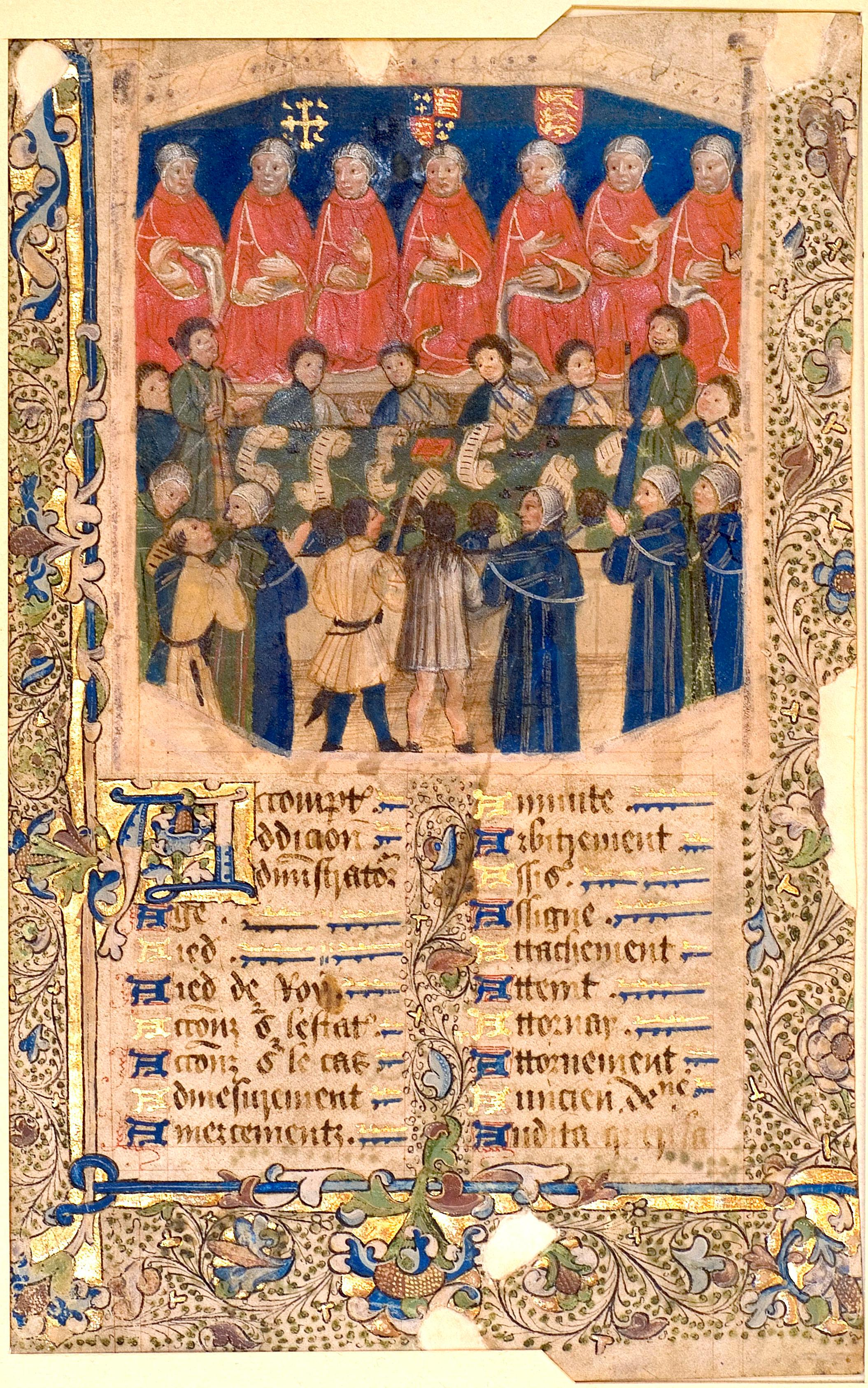
The Court of Common Pleas (here in 1480) was, with the Court of King's Bench, the common law court that heard early cases about broken agreements in debt. Until 1602 it resisted hearing cases without claimants risking perjury.

The modern law of contract is primarily a creature of the Industrial Revolution and the social legislation of the 20th century. However, the foundations of all European contract law are traceable to obligations in Ancient Athenian and Roman law, while the formal development of English law began after the Norman Conquest of 1066. William the Conqueror created a common law across England, but throughout the Middle Ages the court system was minimal. Access to the courts, in what are now considered contractual disputes, was consciously restricted to a privileged few through onerous requirements of pleading, formalities and court fees. In the local and manorial courts, according to English law's first treatise by Ranulf de Glanville in 1188, if people disputed the payment of a debt they, and witnesses, would attend court and swear oaths (called a wager of law). They risked perjury if they lost the case, and so this was strong encouragement to resolve disputes elsewhere.

The royal courts, fixed to meet in London by Magna Carta, accepted claims for "trespass on the case" (more like a tort today). A jury would be called, and no wager of law was needed, but some breach of the King's peace had to be alleged. Gradually, the courts allowed claims where there had been no real trouble, no tort with "force of arms" (vi et armis), but it was still necessary to put this in the pleading. For instance, in 1317 one Simon de Rattlesdene alleged he was sold a tun of wine that was contaminated with salt water and, quite fictitiously, this was said to be done "with force and arms, namely with swords and bows and arrows". The Court of Chancery and the King's Bench slowly started to allow claims without the fictitious allegation of force and arms from around 1350. An action for simple breach of a covenant (a solemn promise) had required production of formal proof of the agreement with a seal. However, in The Humber Ferryman's case a claim was allowed, without any documentary evidence, against a ferryman who dropped a horse overboard that he was contracted to carry across the River Humber. Despite this liberalisation, in the 1200s a threshold of 40 shillings for a dispute's value had been created. Though its importance tapered away with inflation over the years, it foreclosed court access to most people. Moreover, freedom to contract was firmly suppressed among the peasantry. After the Black Death, the Statute of Labourers 1351 prevented any increase in workers' wages fuelling, among other things, the Peasants' Revolt of 1381.

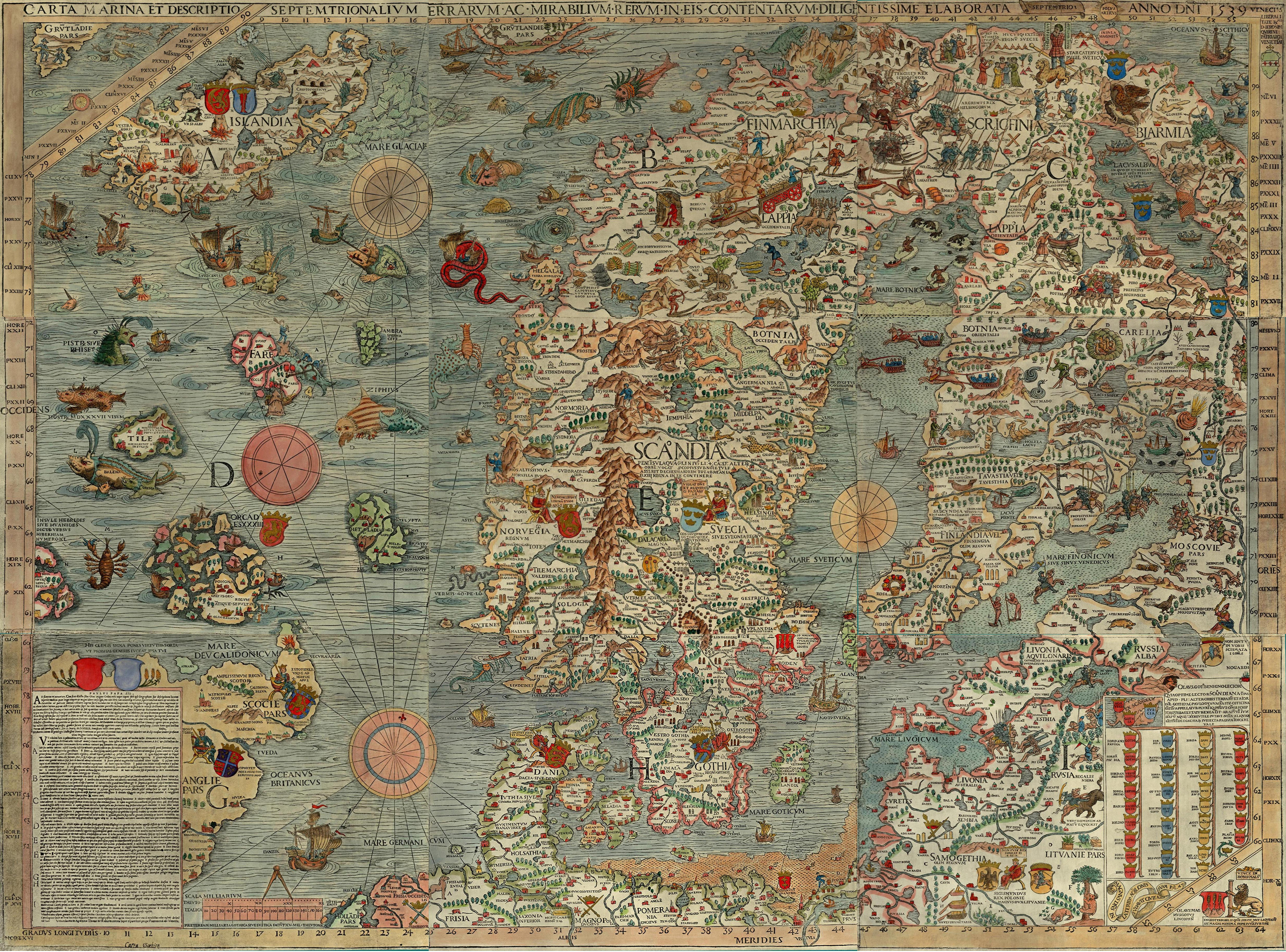
Merchants trading within the North European Hanseatic League followed a law of the merchant, or lex mercatoria, whose principles were received into the English law of contract.

Increasingly, the English law on contractual bargains was affected by its trading relations with northern Europe, particularly since Magna Carta had guaranteed merchants "safe and secure" exit and entry to England "for buying and selling by the ancient rights and customs, quit from all evil tolls". In 1266 King Henry III had granted the Hanseatic League a charter to trade in England. The "Easterlings" who came by boats brought goods and money that the English called "Sterling", and standard rules for commerce that formed a lex mercatoria, the laws of the merchants. Merchant custom was most influential in the coastal trading ports like London, Boston, Hull and King's Lynn. While the courts were hostile to restraints on trade, a doctrine of consideration was forming, so that to enforce any obligation something of value needed to be conveyed. Some courts remained sceptical that damages might be awarded purely for a broken agreement (that was not a sealed covenant). Other disputes allowed a remedy. In Shepton v Dogge a defendant had agreed in London, where the City courts' custom was to allow claims without covenants under seal, to sell 28 acres of land in Hoxton. Although the house itself was outside London at the time, in Middlesex, a remedy was awarded for deceit, but essentially based on a failure to convey the land.

The resolution of these restrictions came shortly after 1585, when a new Court of Exchequer Chamber was established to hear common law appeals. In 1602, in Slade v Morley, a grain merchant named Slade claimed that Morley had agreed to buy wheat and rye for £16, but then had backed out. Actions for debt were in the jurisdiction of the Court of Common Pleas, which had required both (1) proof of a debt, and (2) a subsequent promise to repay the debt, so that a finding of deceit (for non-payment) could be made against a defendant. But if a claimant wanted to simply demand payment of the contractual debt (rather than a subsequent promise to pay) he could have to risk a wager of law. The judges of the Court of the King's Bench was prepared to allow "assumpsit" actions (for obligations being assumed) simply from proof of the original agreement. With a majority in the Exchequer Chamber, after six years Lord Popham CJ held that "every contract importeth in itself an Assumpsit". Around the same time the Common Pleas indicated a different limit for contract enforcement in Bret v JS, that "natural affection of itself is not a sufficient consideration to ground an assumpsit" and there had to be some "express quid pro quo". Now that wager of law, and sealed covenants were essentially unnecessary, the Statute of Frauds 1677 codified the contract types that were thought should still require some form. Over the late 17th and 18th centuries Sir John Holt, and then Lord Mansfield actively incorporated the principles of international trade law and custom into English common law as they saw it: principles of commercial certainty, good faith, fair dealing, and the enforceability of seriously intended promises. As Lord Mansfield held, "Mercantile law is not the law of a particular country but the law of all nations", and "the law of merchants and the law of the land is the same".

'governments do not limit their concern with contracts to a simple enforcement. They take upon themselves to determine what contracts are fit to be enforced.... once it is admitted that there are any engagements which for reasons of expediency the law ought not to enforce, the same question is necessarily opened with respect to all engagements. Whether, for example, the law should enforce a contract to labour, when the wages are too low or the hours of work too severe: whether it should enforce a contract by which a person binds himself to remain, for more than a very limited period, in the service of a given individual.... Every question which can possibly arise as to the policy of contracts, and of the relations which they establish among human beings, is a question for the legislator; and one which he cannot escape from considering, and in some way or other deciding.'

— JS Mill, Principles of Political Economy (1848) Book V, ch 1, §2

Over the industrial revolution, English courts became more and more wedded to the concept of "freedom of contract". It was partly a sign of progress, as the vestiges of feudal and mercantile restrictions on workers and businesses were lifted, a move of people (at least in theory) from "status to contract". On the other hand, a preference for laissez faire thought concealed the inequality of bargaining power in multiple contracts, particularly for employment, consumer goods and services, and tenancies. At the centre of the general law of contracts, captured in nursery rhymes like Robert Browning's Pied Piper of Hamelin in 1842, was the fabled notion that if people had promised something "let us keep our promise". But then, the law purported to cover every form of agreement, as if everybody had the same degree of free will to promise what they wanted. Though many of the most influential liberal thinkers, especially John Stuart Mill, believed in multiple exceptions to the rule that laissez faire was the best policy, the courts were suspicious of interfering in agreements, whoever the parties were. In Printing and Numerical Registering Co v Sampson Sir George Jessel MR proclaimed it a "public policy" that "contracts when entered into freely and voluntarily shall be held sacred and shall be enforced by Courts of justice." The same year, the Judicature Act 1875 merged the Courts of Chancery and common law, with equitable principles (such as estoppel, undue influence, rescission for misrepresentation and fiduciary duties or disclosure requirements in some transactions) always taking precedence.

The essential principles of English contract law, however, remained stable and familiar, as an offer for certain terms, mirrored by an acceptance, supported by consideration, and free from duress, undue influence or misrepresentation, would generally be enforceable. The rules were codified and exported across the British Empire, as for example in the Indian Contract Act 1872. Further requirements of fairness in exchanges between unequal parties, or general obligations of good faith and disclosure were said to be unwarranted because it was urged by the courts that liabilities "are not to be forced upon people behind their backs". Parliamentary legislation, outside general codifications of commercial law like the Sale of Goods Act 1893, similarly left people to the harsh realities of the market and "freedom of contract". This only changed when the property qualifications to vote for members of parliament were reduced and eliminated, as the United Kingdom slowly became more democratic.

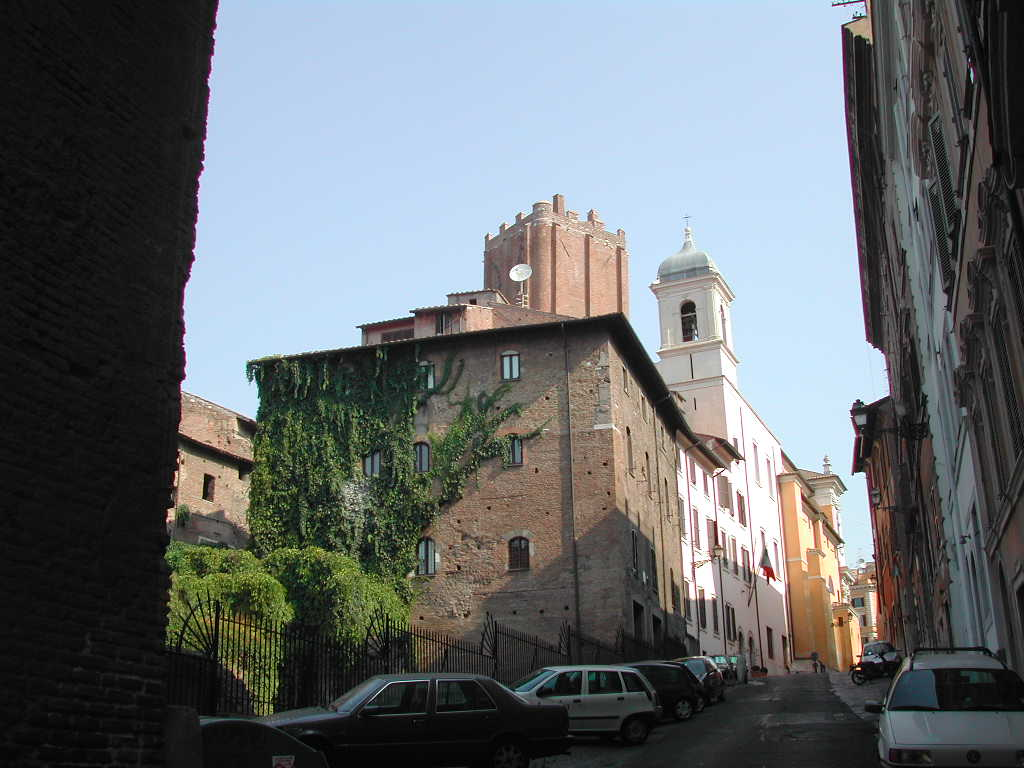
Unidroit, based in Rome and established in 1926 under the League of Nations to unify private law, maintains the influential Principles of International Commercial Contracts of 2004. A similar effort is the Principles of European Contract Law of 2002.

Over the 20th century, legislation and changes in court attitudes effected a wide-ranging reform of 19th century contract law. First, specific types of non-commercial contract were given special protection where "freedom of contract" appeared far more on the side of large businesses. Consumer contracts came to be regarded as "contracts of adhesion" where there was no real negotiation and most people were given "take it or leave it" terms. The courts began by requiring entirely clear information before onerous clauses could be enforced, the Misrepresentation Act 1967 switched the burden of proof onto business to show misleading statements were not negligent, and the Unfair Contract Terms Act 1977 created the jurisdiction to scrap contract terms that were "unreasonable", considering the bargaining power of the parties. Collective bargaining by trade unions and a growing number of employment rights carried the employment contract into an autonomous field of labour law where workers had rights, like a minimum wage, fairness in dismissal, the right to join a union and take collective action, and these could not be given up in a contract with an employer. Private housing was subject to basic terms, such as the right to repairs, and restrictions on unfair rent increases, though many protections were abolished during the 1980s. Nevertheless, the scope of the general law of contract had been reduced. It meant that most contracts made by people on an ordinary day were shielded from the power of corporations to impose whatever terms they chose in selling goods and services, at work, and in people's home. Nevertheless, classical contract law remained at the foundation of those specific contracts, unless particular rights were given by the courts or Parliament. Internationally, the UK had joined the European Union, which aimed to harmonise significant parts of consumer and employment law across member states. Moreover, with increasing openness of markets commercial contract law was receiving principles from abroad. Both the Principles of European Contract Law, the UNIDROIT Principles of International Commercial Contracts, and the practice of international commercial arbitration was reshaping thinking about English contract principles in an increasingly globalised economy.

== Formation ==
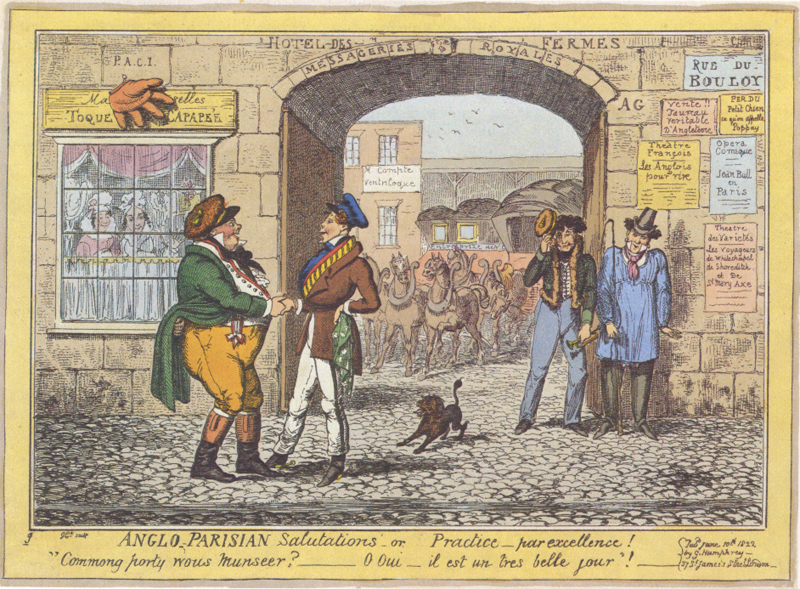
An English and a Frenchman shake hands on an agreement.

In its essence a contract is an agreement which the law recognises as giving rise to enforceable obligations. As opposed to tort and unjust enrichment, contract is the part of the law of obligations which deals with voluntary undertakings. It places a high priority on ensuring that only bargains to which people have given their true consent will be enforced by the courts. While it is not always clear when people have truly agreed in a subjective sense, English law takes the view that when one person objectively manifests their consent to a bargain, they will be bound. However, not all agreements, even if they are relatively certain in subject matter, are considered enforceable. There is a rebuttable presumption that people do not wish to later have legal enforcement of agreements made socially or domestically. The general rule is that contracts require no prescribed form, such as being in writing, except where statute requires it, usually for large deals like the sale of land. In addition and in contrast to civil law systems, English common law carried a general requirement that all parties, in order to have standing to enforce an agreement, must have brought something of value, or "consideration" to the bargain. This old rule is full of exceptions, particularly where people wished to vary their agreements, through case law and the equitable doctrine of promissory estoppel. Moreover, statutory reform in the Contracts (Rights of Third Parties) Act 1999 allows third parties to enforce the benefit of an agreement that they had not necessarily paid for so long as the original parties to a contract consented to them being able to do so.

=== Agreement ===
The formal approach of English courts is that agreement exists when an offer is mirrored by an unequivocal acceptance of the terms on offer. Whether an offer has been made, or it has been accepted, is an issue courts determine by asking what a reasonable person would have thought was intended. Offers are distinguished from "invitations to treat" (or an invitatio ad offerendum, the invitation of an offer) which cannot be simply accepted by the other party. Traditionally, English law has viewed the display of goods in a shop, even with a price tag, as an invitation to treat, so that when a customer takes the product to the till it is she who is making the offer, and the shopkeeper may refuse to sell. Similarly, and as a very general rule, an advertisement, the invitation to make a bid at an auction with a reserve price, or the invitation to submit a tender bid are not considered offers. On the other hand, a person inviting tenders may fall under a duty to consider the submissions if they arrive before the deadline, so the bidder (even though there is no contract) could sue for damages if his bid is never considered. An auctioneer who publicises an auction as being without a reserve price falls under a duty to accept the highest bid. An automated vending machine constitutes a standing offer, and a court may construe an advertisement, or something on display like a deckchair, to be a serious offer if a customer would be led to believe they were accepting its terms by performing an action. Statute imposes criminal penalties for businesses that engage in misleading advertising, or not selling products at the prices they display in store, or unlawfully discriminating against customers on grounds of race, gender, sexuality, disability, belief or age. The Principles of European Contract Law article 2:201 suggests that most EU member states count a proposal to supply any good or service by a professional as an offer.

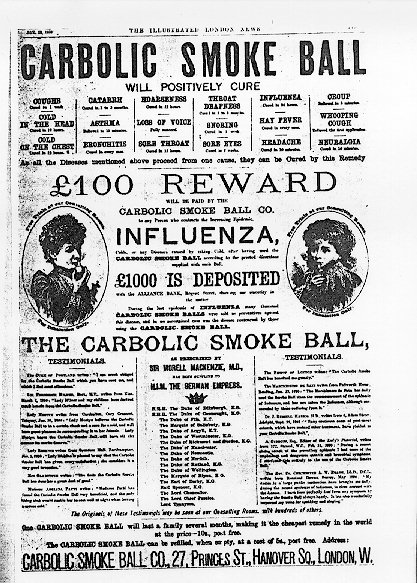
"Read the advertisement how you will, and twist it about as you will," said Lindley LJ of the Smoke Ball advert, "here is a distinct promise expressed in language which is perfectly unmistakable".

Once an offer is made, the general rule is the offeree must communicate her acceptance in order to have a binding agreement. Notification of acceptance must actually reach a point where the offeror could reasonably be expected to know, although if the recipient is at fault, for instance, by not putting enough ink in their fax machine for a message arriving in office hours to be printed, the recipient will still be bound. This goes for all methods of communication, whether oral, by phone, through telex, fax or email, except for the post. Acceptance by letter takes place when the letter is put in the postbox. The postal exception is a product of history, and does not exist in most countries. It only exists in English law so long as it is reasonable to use the post for a reply (e.g. not in response to an email), and its operation would not create manifest inconvenience and absurdity (e.g. the letter goes missing). In all cases it is possible for the negotiating parties to stipulate a prescribed mode of acceptance. It is not possible for an offeror to impose an obligation on the offeree to reject the offer without her consent. However, it is clear that people can accept through silence, firstly, by demonstrating through their conduct that they accept. In Brogden v Metropolitan Railway Company, although the Metropolitan Railway Company had never returned a letter from Mr Brogden formalising a long-term supply arrangement for Mr Brogden's coal, they had conducted themselves for two years as if it were in effect, and Mr Brogden was bound. Secondly, the offeror may waive the need for communication of acceptance, either expressly, or implicitly, as in Carlill v Carbolic Smoke Ball Company. Here a quack medicine company advertised its "smoke ball", stating that if a customer found it did not cure them of the flu after using it thrice daily for two weeks, they would get £100. After noting the advertisement was serious enough to be an offer, not mere puff or an invitation to treat, the Court of Appeal held the accepting party only needed to use the smoke ball as prescribed to get the £100. Although the general rule was to require communication of acceptance, the advertisement had tacitly waived the need for Mrs Carlill, or anyone else, to report her acceptance first. In other cases, such as where a reward is advertised for information, the only requirement of the English courts appears to be knowledge of the offer. Where someone makes such a unilateral offer, they fall under a duty to not revoke it once someone has begun to act on the offer. Otherwise an offer may always be revoked before it is accepted. The general rule is that revocation must be communicated, even if by post, although if the offerree hears about the withdrawal from a third party, this is as good as a withdrawal from the offeror himself. Finally, an offer can be "killed off" if, rather than a mere inquiry for information, someone makes a counter offer. So in Hyde v Wrench, when Wrench offered to sell his farm for £1000, and Hyde replied that he would buy it for £950 and Wrench refused, Hyde could not then change his mind and accept the original £1000 offer.

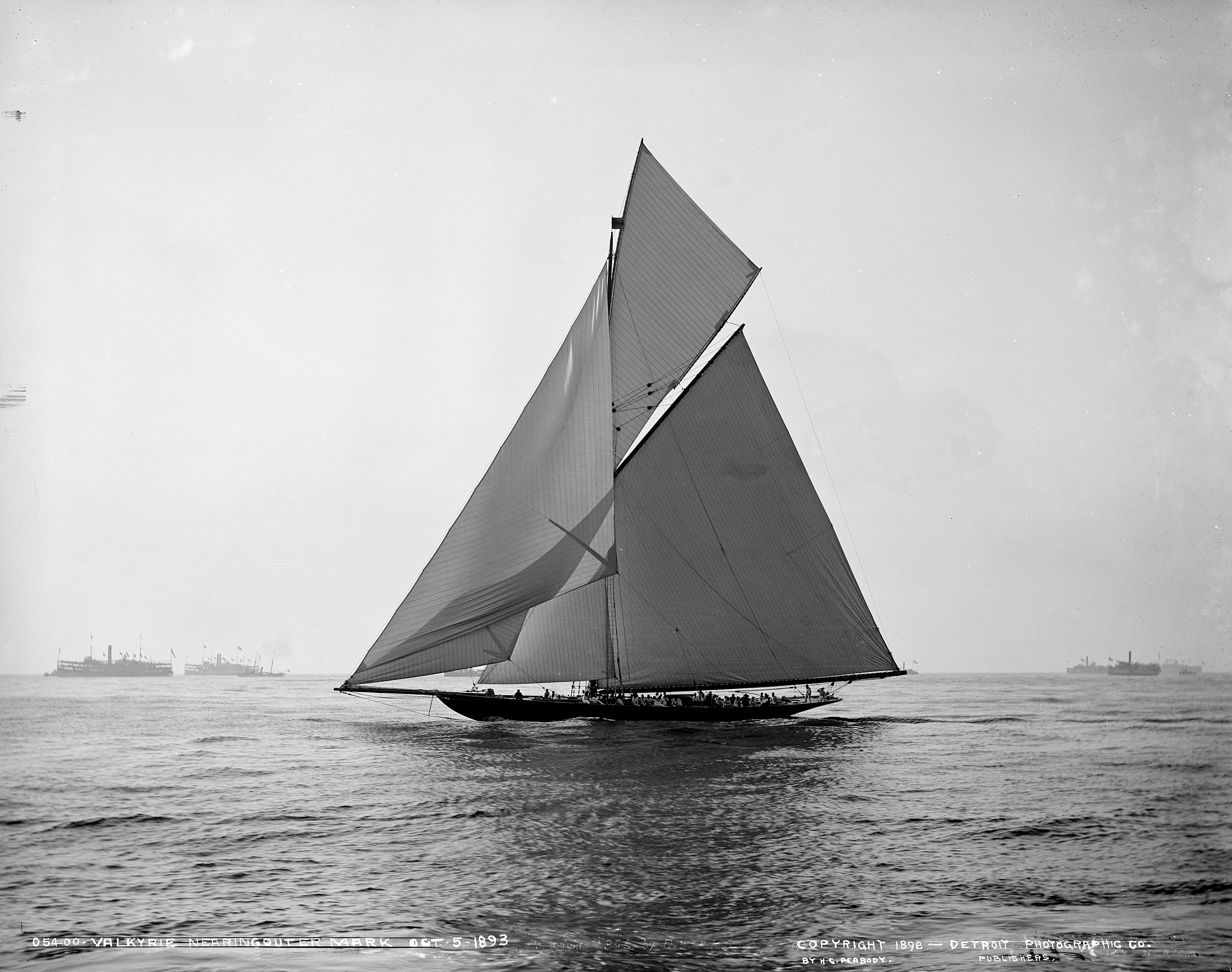
The Valkyrie II, sunk by the aptly named The Satanita, had to be paid for because of a tacit contract of the racers.

While the model of an offer mirroring acceptance makes sense to analyse almost all agreements, it does not fit in some cases. In The Satanita the rules of a yacht race stipulated that the yachtsmen would be liable, beyond limits set in statute, to pay for all damage to other boats. The Court of Appeal held that there was a contract to pay arising from the rules of the competition between The Satanita's owner and the owner of Valkyrie II, which he sank, even though there was no clear offer mirrored by a clear acceptance between the parties at any point. Along with a number of other critics, in a series of cases Lord Denning MR proposed that English law ought to abandon its rigid attachment to offer and acceptance in favour of a broader rule, that the parties need to be in substantial agreement on the material points in the contract. In Butler Machine Tool Co Ltd v Ex-Cell-O Corp Ltd this would have meant that during a "battle of forms" two parties were construed as having material agreement on the buyer's standard terms, and excluding a price variation clause, although the other court members reached the same view on ordinary analysis. In Gibson v Manchester CC he would have come to a different result to the House of Lords, by allowing Mr Gibson to buy his house from the council, even though the council's letter stated it "should not be regarded as a firm offer". This approach would potentially give greater discretion to a court to do what appears appropriate at the time, without being tied to what the parties may have subjectively intended, particularly where those intentions obviously conflicted.

In a number of instances, the courts avoid enforcement of contracts where, although there is a formal offer and acceptance, little objective agreement exists otherwise. In Hartog v Colin & Shields, where the seller of some Argentine hare skins quoted his prices far below what previous negotiations had suggested, the buyer could not enforce the agreement because any reasonable person would have known the offer was not serious, but a mistake. Moreover, if two parties think they reach an agreement, but their offer and acceptance concerns two entirely different things, the court will not enforce a contract. In Raffles v Wichelhaus, Raffles thought he was selling cotton aboard one ship called The Peerless, which would arrive from Bombay in Liverpool in December, but Wichelhaus thought he was buying cotton aboard another ship called The Peerless that would arrive in September. The court held there was never consensus ad idem (Latin: "agreement to the [same] thing"). Where agreements totally fail, but one party has performed work at another's request, relying on the idea that there will be a contract, that party may make a claim for the value of the work done, or quantum meruit. Such a restitution claim allows recovery for the expense the claimant goes to, but will not cover her expectation of potential profits, because there is no agreement to be enforced.

=== Certainty and enforceability ===
While agreement is the basis for all contracts, not all agreements are enforceable. A preliminary question is whether the contract is reasonably certain in its essential terms, or essentialia negotii, such as price, subject matter and the identity of the parties. Generally the courts endeavour to "make the agreement work", so in Hillas & Co Ltd v Arcos Ltd, the House of Lords held that an option to buy softwood of "fair specification" was sufficiently certain to be enforced, when read in the context of previous agreements between the parties. However the courts do not wish to "make contracts for people", and so in Scammell and Nephew Ltd v Ouston, a clause stipulating the price of buying a new van as "on hire purchase terms" for two years was held unenforceable because there was no objective standard by which the court could know what price was intended or what a reasonable price might be. Similarly, in Baird Textile Holdings Ltd v M&S plc the Court of Appeal held that because the price and quantity to buy would be uncertain, in part, no term could be implied for M&S to give reasonable notice before terminating its purchasing agreement. Controversially, the House of Lords extended this idea by holding an agreement to negotiate towards a future contract in good faith is insufficiently certain to be enforceable.

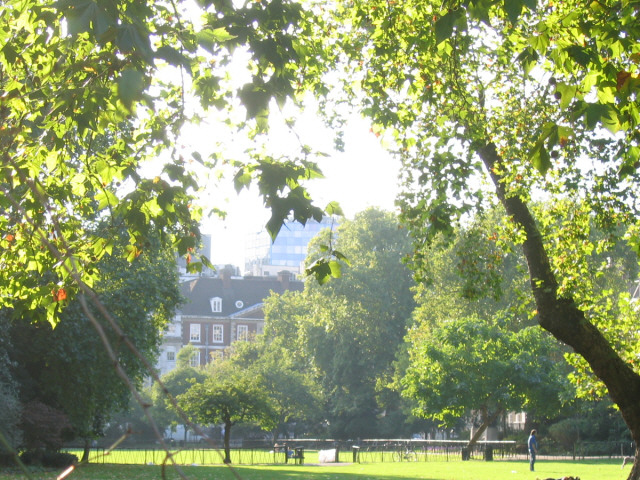
Jones v Padavatton held that a daughter studying for the bar at Lincoln's Inn could not sue her mother to keep a house.

While many agreements can be certain, it is by no means certain that in the case of social and domestic affairs people want their agreements to be legally binding. In Balfour v Balfour Atkin LJ held that Mr Balfour's agreement to pay his wife £30 a month while he worked in Ceylon should be presumed unenforceable, because people do not generally intend such promises in the social sphere to create legal consequences. Similarly, an agreement between friends at a pub, or a daughter and her mother will fall into this sphere, but not a couple who are on the verge of separation, and not friends engaged in big transactions, particularly where one side relies heavily to their detriment on the assurances of the other. This presumption of unenforceability can always be rebutted by express agreement otherwise, for instance by writing the deal down. By contrast, agreements made among businesses are almost conclusively presumed to be enforceable. But again, express words, such as "This arrangement... shall not be subject to legal jurisdiction in the law courts" will be respected. In one situation, statute presumes that collective agreements between a trade union and an employer are not intended to create legal relations, ostensibly to keep excessive litigation away from UK labour law.

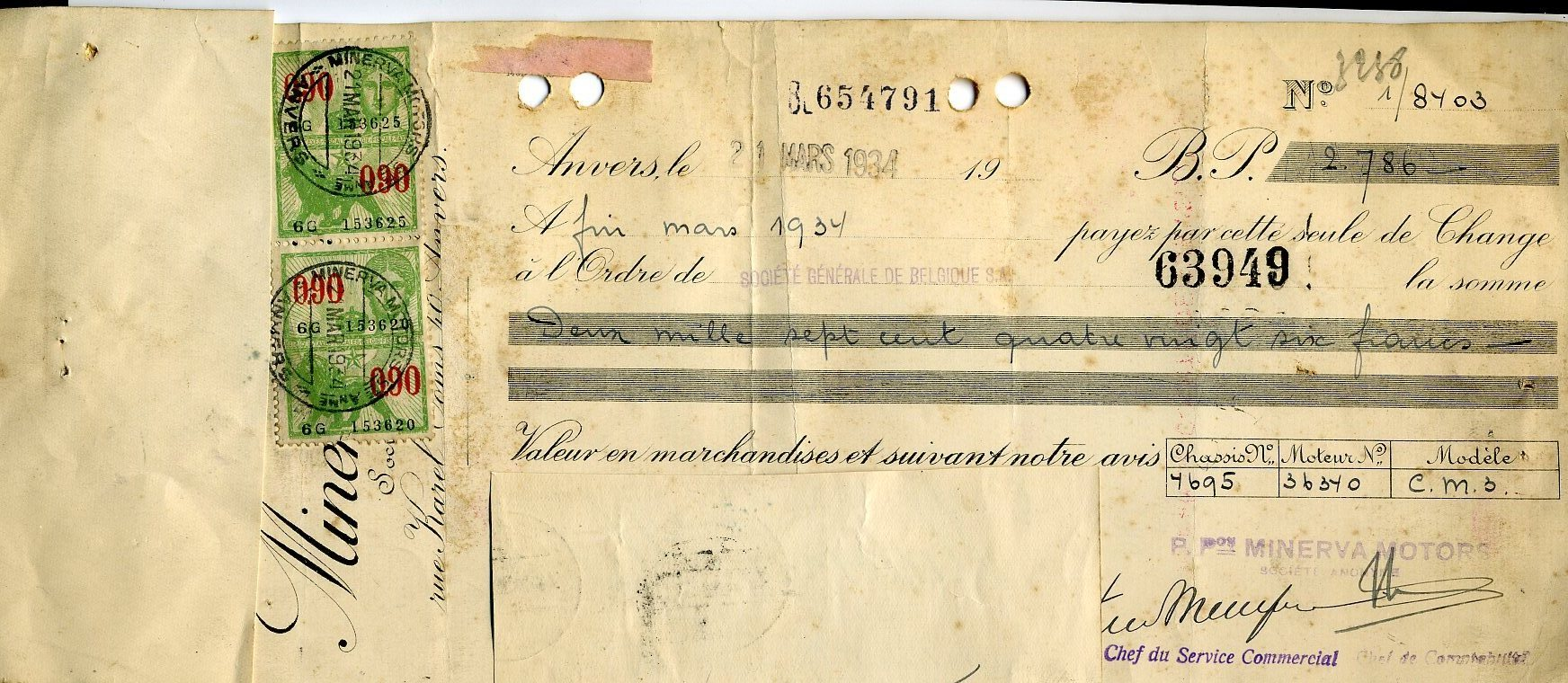
A bill of exchange, for instance a cheque, is an order by one person to another (typically a bank) to pay a sum of money to a third person. Under BEA 1882 s 3 it must be written and signed.

In a limited number of cases, an agreement will be unenforceable unless it meets a certain form prescribed by statute. While contracts can be generally made without formality, some transactions are thought to require form either because it makes a person think carefully before they bind themselves to an agreement, or merely that it serves as clear evidence. This goes typically for large engagements, including the sale of land, a lease of property over three years, a consumer credit agreement, and a bill of exchange. A contract for guarantee must also, at some stage, be evidenced in writing. Finally, English law takes the approach that a gratuitous promise, as a matter of contract law, is not legally binding. While a gift that is delivered will transfer property irrevocably, and while someone may always bind themselves to a promise without anything in return to deliver a thing in future if they sign a deed that is witnessed, a simple promise to do something in future can be revoked. This result is reached, with some complexity, through a peculiarity of English law called the doctrine of consideration.

=== Consideration and estoppel ===
Consideration is an additional requirement in English law before a contract is enforceable. A person wishing to enforce an agreement must show that they have brought something to the bargain which has "something of value in the eyes of the law", either by conferring a benefit on another person or incurring a detriment at their request. In practice this means not simple gratitude or love, not things already done in the past, and not promising to perform a pre-existing duty unless performance takes place for a third party. Metaphorically, consideration is "the price for which the promise is bought". It is contentious in the sense that it gives rise to a level of complexity that legal systems which do not take their heritage from English law simply do not have. In reality the doctrine of consideration operates in a very small scope, and creates few difficulties in commercial practice. After reform in the United States, especially the Restatement of Contracts §90 which allows all promises to bind if it would otherwise lead to "injustice", a report in 1937 by the Law Revision Committee, Statute of Frauds and the Doctrine of Consideration, proposed that promises in writing, for past consideration, for part payments of debt, promising to perform pre-existing obligations, promising to keep an offer open, and promises that another relies on to their detriment should all be binding. The report was never enacted in legislation, but almost all of its recommendations have been put into effect through case law since, albeit with difficulty.

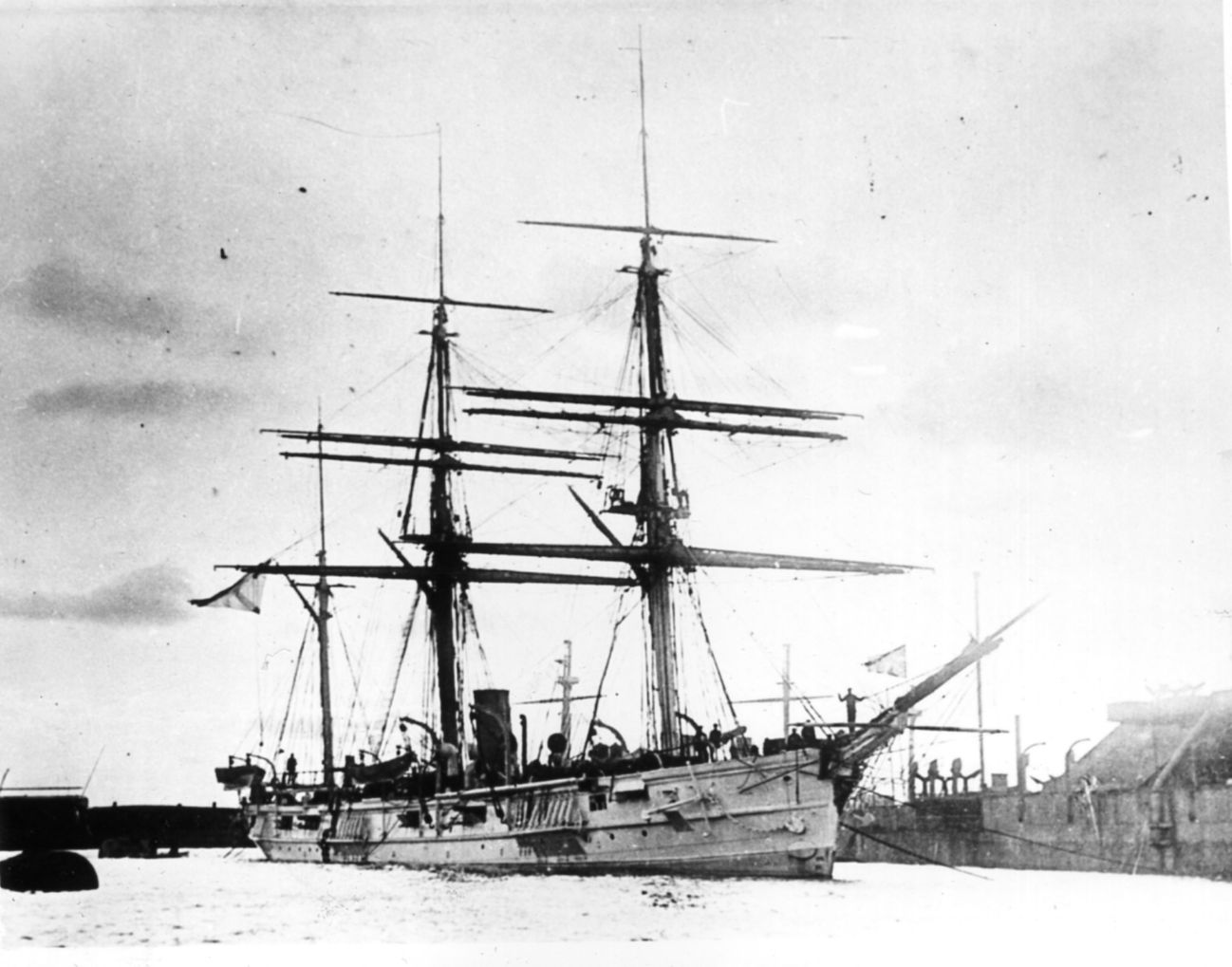
The old case of Stilk v Myrick held that sailors could not enforce a promise for higher wages for getting home on fewer crew when their contract required them to perform in all emergencies. At the time, there was no doctrine of economic duress, and significant fear of mutiny on the high seas.

When a contract is formed, good consideration is needed, and so a gratuitous promise is not binding. That said, while consideration must be of sufficient value in the law's eyes, it need not reflect an adequate price. Proverbially, one may sell a house for as little as a peppercorn, even if the seller "does not like pepper and will throw away the corn." This means the courts do not generally enquire into the fairness of the exchange, unless there is statutory regulation or (in specific contexts such as for consumers, employment, or tenancies) there are two parties of unequal bargaining power. Another difficulty is that consideration for a deal was said not to exist if the thing given was an act done before the promise, such as promising to pay off a loan for money already used to educate a girl. In this situation the courts have long shown themselves willing to hold that the thing done was implicitly relying on the expectation of a reward. More significant problems arise where parties to a contract wish to vary its terms. The old rule, predating the development of the protections in the law of economic duress, was that if one side merely promises to perform a duty which she had already undertaken in return for a higher price, there is no contract. However, in the leading case of Williams v Roffey Bros & Nicholls (Contractors) Ltd, the Court of Appeal held that it would be more ready to construe someone performing essentially what they were bound to do before as giving consideration for the new deal if they conferred a "practical benefit" on the other side. So, when Williams, a carpenter, was promised by Roffey Bros, the builders, more money to complete work on time, it was held that because Roffey Bros would avoid having to pay a penalty clause for late completion of its own contract, would potentially avoid the expense of litigation and had a slightly more sensible mechanism for payments, these were enough. Speaking of consideration, Russell LJ stated that, "courts nowadays should be more ready to find its existence... where the bargaining powers are not unequal and where the finding of consideration reflects the true intention of the parties." In other words, in the context of contractual variations, the definition of consideration has been watered down. However, in one situation the "practical benefit" analysis cannot be invoked, namely where the agreed variation is to reduce debt repayments. In Foakes v Beer, the House of Lords held that even though Mrs Beer promised Mr Foakes he could pay back £2090 19s by instalment and without interest, she could subsequently change her mind and demand the whole sum. Despite Lord Blackburn registering a note of dissent in that case and other doubts, the Court of Appeal held in Re Selectmove Ltd, that it was bound by the precedent of the Lords and could not deploy the "practical benefit" reasoning of Williams for any debt repayment cases.

However, consideration is a doctrine deriving from the common law, and can be suspended under the principles of equity. Historically, England had two separate court systems, and the Courts of Chancery which derived their ultimate authority from the King via the Lord Chancellor, took precedence over the common law courts. So does its body of equitable principles since the systems were merged in 1875. The doctrine of promissory estoppel holds that when one person gives an assurance to another, the other relies on it and it would be inequitable to go back on the assurance, that person will be estopped from doing so: an analogue of the maxim that nobody should profit from their own wrong (nemo auditur propriam turpitudinem allegans). So in Hughes v Metropolitan Railway Co the House of Lords held that a tenant could not be ejected by the landlord for failing to keep up with his contractual repair duties because starting negotiations to sell the property gave the tacit assurance that the repair duties were suspended. And in Central London Properties Ltd v High Trees House Ltd Denning J held that a landlord would be estopped from claiming normal rent during the years of World War II because he had given an assurance that half rent could be paid till the war was done. The Court of Appeal went even further in a recent debt repayment case, Collier v P&M J Wright (Holdings) Ltd. Arden LJ argued that a partner who had been assured he was only liable to repay one third of the partnership's debts, rather than be jointly and severally liable for the whole, had relied on the assurance by making repayments, and it was inequitable for the finance company to later demand full repayment of the debt. Hence, promissory estoppel could circumvent the common law rule of Foakes. Promissory estoppel, however, has been thought to be incapable of raising an independent cause of action, so that one may only plead another party is estopped from enforcing their strict legal rights as a "shield", but cannot bring a cause of action out of estoppel as a "sword". In Australia, this rule was relaxed in Walton Stores (Interstate) Ltd v Maher, where Mr Maher was encouraged to believe he would have a contract to sell his land, and began knocking down his existing building before Walton Stores finally told him they did not wish to complete. Mr Maher got generous damages covering his loss (i.e. reliance damages, but seemingly damages for loss of expectations as if there were a contract). Yet, where an assurance concerns rights over property, a variant "proprietary estoppel" does allow a claimant to plead estoppel as a cause of action. So in Crabb v Arun District Council, Mr Crabbe was assured he would have the right to an access point to his land by Arun District Council, and relying on that he sold off half the property where the only existing access point was. The council was estopped from not doing what they said they would. Given the complex route of legal reasoning to reach simple solutions, it is unsurprising that a number of commentators, as well as the Principles of European Contract Law have called for simple abandonment of the doctrine of consideration, leaving the basic requirements of agreement and an intention to create legal relations. Such a move would also dispense with the need for the common law doctrine of privity.

=== Privity ===
The common law of privity of contract is a sub-rule of consideration because it restricts who can enforce an agreement to those who have brought consideration to the bargain. In an early case, Tweddle v Atkinson, it was held that because a son had not given any consideration for his father in law's promise to his father to pay the son £200, he could not enforce the promise. Given the principle that standing to enforce an obligation should reflect whoever has a legitimate interest in its performance, a 1996 report by the Law Commission entitled Privity of Contract: Contracts for the Benefit of Third Parties, recommended that while courts should be left free to develop the common law, some of the more glaring injustices should be removed. This led to the Contracts (Rights of Third Parties) Act 1999. Under section 1, a third party may enforce an agreement if it purports to confer a benefit on the third party, either individually or a member as a class, and there is no expressed stipulation that the person was not intended to be able to enforce it. In this respect there is a strong burden on the party claiming enforcement was not intended by a third party. A third party has the same remedies available as a person privy to an agreement, and can enforce both positive benefits, or limits on liability, such as an exclusion clause. The rights of a third party can then only be terminated or withdrawn without her consent if it is reasonably foreseeable that she would rely upon them.

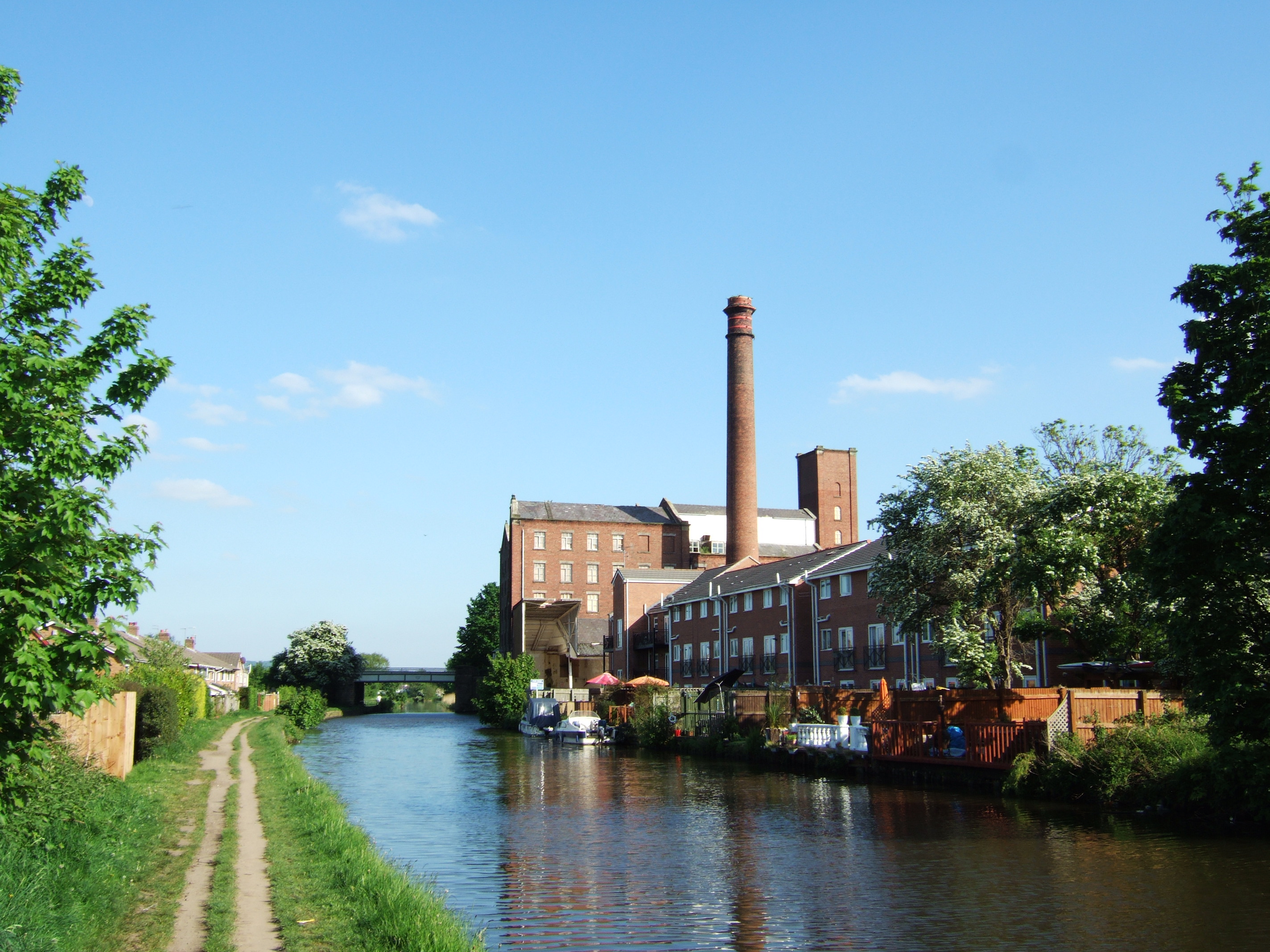
In the River Douglas Catchment Board case Denning LJ delivered the first of many critiques of the privity rule, before CRTPA 1999.

The 1999 Act's reforms mean a number of old cases would be decided differently today. In Beswick v Beswick while the House of Lords held that Mrs Beswick could specifically enforce a promise of her nephew to her deceased husband to pay her £5 weekly in her capacity as administratrix of the will, the 1999 Act would also allow her to claim as a third party. In Scruttons Ltd v Midland Silicones Ltd it would have been possible for a stevedore firm to claim the benefit of a limitation clause in a contract between a carrier and the owner of a damaged drum of chemicals. Lord Denning dissented, arguing for abolition of the rule, and Lord Reid gave an opinion that if a bill of lading expressly conferred the benefit of a limitation on the stevedores, the stevedores give authority to the carrier to do that, and "difficulties about consideration moving from the stevedore were overcome" then the stevedores could benefit. In The Eurymedon, Lord Reid's inventive solution was applied where some stevedores similarly wanted the benefit of an exclusion clause after dropping a drilling machine, the consideration being found as the stevedores performing their pre-existing contractual duty for the benefit of the third party (the drilling machine owner). Now none of this considerably technical analysis is required, given that any contract purporting to confer a benefit on a third party may in principle be enforced by the third party.

Given that the 1999 Act preserves the promisee's right to enforce the contract as it stood at common law, an outstanding issue is to what extent a promisee can claim damages for a benefit on behalf of a third party, if he has suffered no personal loss. In Jackson v Horizon Holidays Ltd, Lord Denning MR held that a father could claim damages for disappointment (beyond the financial cost) of a terrible holiday experience on behalf of his family. However, a majority of the House of Lords in Woodar Investment Development Ltd v Wimpey Construction UK Ltd disapproved any broad ability of a party to a contract to claim damages on behalf of a third party, except perhaps in a limited set of consumer contracts. There is disagreement about whether this will remain the case. Difficulties also remain in cases involving houses built with defects, which are sold to a buyer, who subsequently sells to a third party. It appears that neither the initial buyer can claim on behalf of the third party, and nor will the third party be able to claim under the 1999 Act, as they will typically not be identified by the original contract (or known) in advance. Apart from this instance relating to tort, in practice the doctrine of privity is entirely ignored in numerous situations, throughout the law of trusts and agency.

== Construction ==
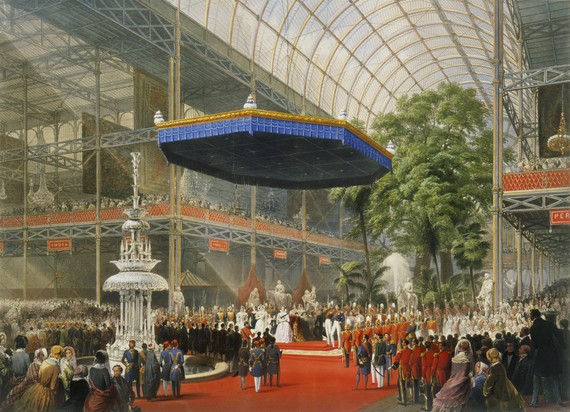
As the Great Exhibition 1851 saw the height of industrial commerce in the British Empire, and the depths of Dickensian poverty, English contract law fashioned a theory of freedom of contract, or laissez faire. Today the law aims for fairness where one contracting party (e.g. a consumer, employee or tenant) is much less "free" due unequal bargaining power.

If an enforceable agreement – a contract – exists, the details of the contract's terms matter if one party has allegedly broken the agreement. A contract's terms are what was promised. Yet it is up to the courts to construe evidence of what the parties said before a contract's conclusion, and construe the terms agreed. Construction of the contract starts with the express promises people make to one another, but also with terms found in other documents or notices that were intended to be incorporated. The general rule is that reasonable notice of the term is needed, and more notice is needed for an onerous term. The meaning of those terms must then be interpreted, and the modern approach is to construe the meaning of an agreement from the perspective of a reasonable person with knowledge of the whole context. The courts, as well as legislation, may also imply terms into contracts generally to 'fill gaps' as necessary to fulfil the reasonable expectations of the parties, or as necessary incidents to specific contracts. English law had, particularly in the late 19th century, adhered to the laissez faire principle of "freedom of contract" so that, in the general law of contract, people can agree to whatever terms or conditions they choose. By contrast, specific contracts, particularly for consumers, employees or tenants were built to carry a minimum core of rights, mostly deriving from statute, that aim to secure the fairness of contractual terms. The evolution of case law in the 20th century generally shows an ever-clearer distinction between general contracts among commercial parties and those between parties of unequal bargaining power, since in these groups of transaction true choice is thought to be hampered by lack of real competition in the market. Hence, some terms can be found to be unfair under statutes such as the Unfair Contract Terms Act 1977 or Part 2 of the Consumer Rights Act 2015 and can be removed by the courts, with the administrative assistance of the Competition and Markets Authority.

=== Incorporation of terms ===
The promises offered by one person to another are the terms of a contract, but not every representation before an acceptance will always count as a term. The basic rule of construction is that a representation is a term if it looked like it was "intended" to be from the viewpoint of a reasonable person. It matters how much importance is attached to the term by the parties themselves, but also as a way to protect parties of lesser means, the courts added that someone who is in a more knowledgeable position will be more likely to be taken to have made a promise, rather than a mere representation. In Oscar Chess Ltd v Williams Mr Williams sold a Morris car to a second hand dealer and wrongly (but in good faith, relying on a forged log-book) said it was a 1948 model when it was really from 1937. The Court of Appeal held that the car dealer could not later claim breach of contract because they were in a better position to know the model. By contrast, in Dick Bentley Productions Ltd v Harold Smith (Motors) Ltd the Court of Appeal held that when a car dealer sold a Bentley to a customer, mistakenly stating it had done 20,000 miles when the true figure was 100,000 miles, this was intended to become a term because the car dealer was in a better position to know. A misrepresentation may also generate the right to cancel (or "rescind") the contract and claim damages for "reliance" losses (as if the statement had not been made, and so to get one's money back). But if the representation is also a contract term a claimant may also get damages reflecting "expected" profits (as if the contract were performed as promised), though often the two measures coincide.

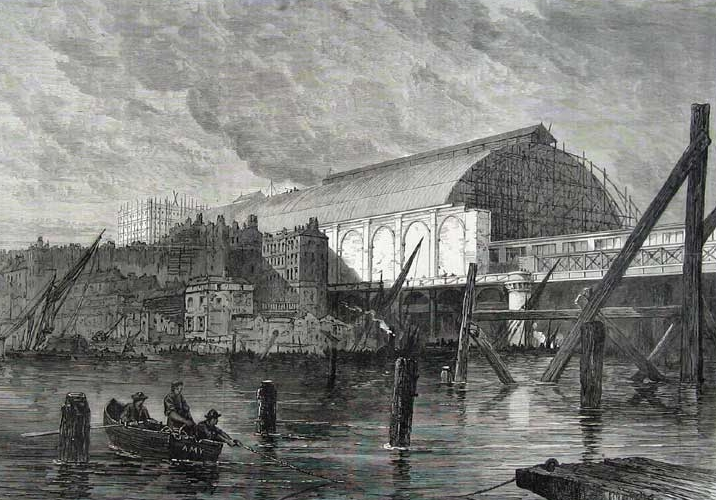
Parker v South Eastern Rly Co, a case from Charing Cross station, held to incorporate terms, people need to give reasonable notice of them before a contract.

When a contract is written down, there is a basic presumption that the written document will contain terms of an agreement, and when commercial parties sign documents every term referred to in the document binds them, unless the term is found to be unfair, the signed document is merely an administrative paper, or under the very limited defence of non est factum. The rules differ in principle for employment contracts, and consumer contracts, or wherever a statutory right is engaged, and so the signature rule matters most in commercial dealings, where businesses place a high value on certainty. If a statement is a term, and the contracting party has not signed a document, then terms may be incorporated by reference to other sources, or through a course of dealing. The basic rule, set out in Parker v South Eastern Railway Company, is that reasonable notice of a term is required to bind someone. Here Mr Parker left his coat in the Charing Cross railway station cloakroom and was given a ticket that on the back said liability for loss was limited to £10. The Court of Appeal sent this back to trial for a jury (as existed at the time) to determine. The modern approach is to add that if a term is particularly onerous, greater notice with greater clarity ought to be given. Denning LJ in J Spurling Ltd v Bradshaw famously remarked that "Some clauses which I have seen would need to be printed in red ink on the face of the document with a red hand pointing to it before the notice could be held to be sufficient." In Thornton v Shoe Lane Parking Ltd a car park ticket referring to a notice inside the car park was insufficient to exclude the car park's liability for personal injury of customers on its premises. In Interfoto Picture Library Ltd v Stiletto Ltd Bingham LJ held that a notice inside a jiffy bag of photographic transparencies about a fee for late return of the transparencies (which would have totalled £3,783.50 for 47 transparencies after only a month) was too onerous a term to be incorporated without clear notice. By contrast in O'Brien v MGN Ltd Hale LJ held that the failure of the Daily Mirror to say in every newspaper that if there were too many winners in its free draw for £50,000 that there would be another draw was not so onerous on the disappointed "winners" as to prevent incorporation of the term. It can also be that a regular and consistent course of dealings between two parties lead the terms from previous dealings to be incorporated into future ones. In Hollier v Rambler Motors Ltd the Court of Appeal held that Mr Hollier, whose car was burnt in a fire caused by a careless employee at Rambler Motors' garage, was not bound by a clause excluding liability for "damage caused by fire" on the back of an invoice which he had seen three or four times in visits over the last five years. This was not regular or consistent enough. But in British Crane Hire Corporation Ltd v Ipswich Plant Hire Ltd Lord Denning MR held that a company hiring a crane was bound by a term making them pay for expenses of recovering the crane when it sank into marshland, after only one prior dealing. Of particular importance was the equal bargaining power of the parties.

=== Interpretation ===
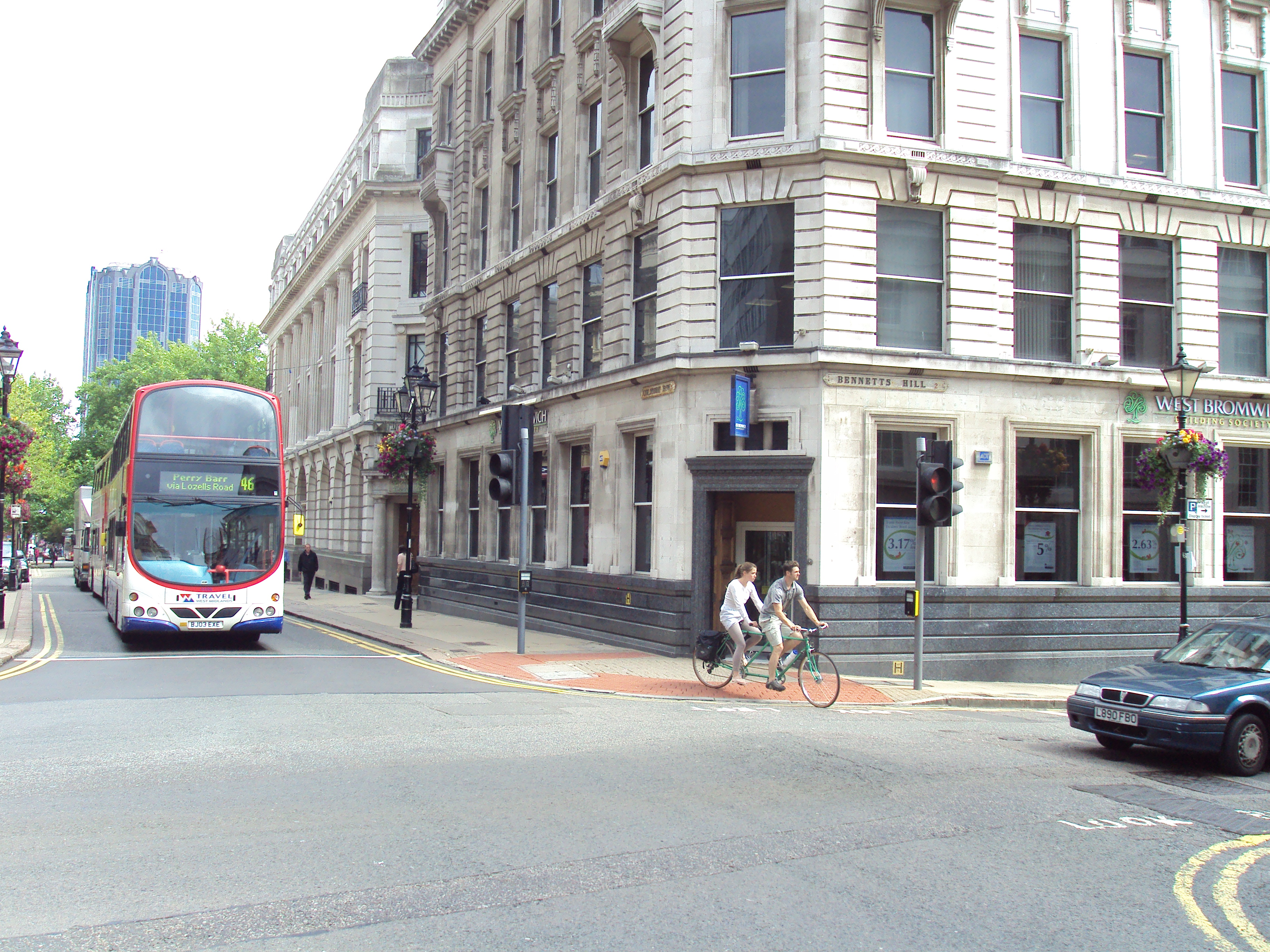
All English contracts are, after ICS Ltd v West Browmwich BS, involving a compensation scheme for poorly advised investors, interpreted objectively and in their context.

Once it is established which terms are incorporated into an agreement, their meaning must be determined. Since the introduction of legislation regulating unfair terms, English courts have become firmer in their general guiding principle that agreements are construed to give effect to the intentions of the parties from the standpoint of a reasonable person. This changed significantly from the early 20th century, when English courts had become enamoured with a literalist theory of interpretation, championed in part by Lord Halsbury. As greater concern grew around the mid-20th century over unfair terms, and particularly exclusion clauses, the courts swung to the opposite position, utilising heavily the doctrine of contra proferentem. Ambiguities in clauses excluding or limiting one party's liability would be construed against the person relying on it. In the leading case, Canada Steamship Lines Ltd v R the Crown's shed in Montreal harbour burnt down, destroying goods owned by Canada Steamship lines. Lord Morton held that a clause in the contract limiting the Crown's excluding liability for "damage... to... goods... being... in the said shed" was not enough to excuse it from liability for negligence because the clause could also be construed as referring to strict liability under another contract clause. It would exclude that instead. Some judges, and in particular Lord Denning wished to go further by introducing a rule of "fundamental breach of contract" whereby no liability for very serious breaches of contract could be excluded at all. While the rules remain ready for application where statute may not help, such hostile approaches to interpretation were generally felt to run contrary to the plain meaning of language.

Reflecting the modern position since unfair terms legislation was enacted, the most quoted passage in English courts on the canons of interpretation is found in Lord Hoffmann's judgement in ICS Ltd v West Bromwich BS. Lord Hoffmann restated the law that a document's meaning is what it would mean (1) to a reasonable person (2) with knowledge of the context, or the whole matrix of fact (3) except prior negotiations (4) and meaning does not follow what the dictionary says but meaning understood from its context (5) and the meaning should not contradict common sense. The objective is always to give effect to the intentions of the parties. While it remains the law for reasons of litigation cost, there is some contention over how far evidence of prior negotiations should be excluded by the courts. It appears increasingly clear that the courts may adduce evidence of negotiations where it would clearly assist in construing the meaning of an agreement. This approach to interpretation has some overlap with the right of the parties to seek "rectification" of a document, or requesting from a court to read a document not literally but with regard to what the parties can otherwise show was really intended.

=== Implied terms ===
"The foundation of contract is the reasonable expectation, which the person who promises raises in the person to whom he binds himself; of which the satisfaction may be exerted by force."

— Adam Smith, Lectures on Jurisprudence (1763) Part I, Introduction

Part of the process of construction includes the courts and statute implying terms into agreements. Courts imply terms, as a general rule, when the express terms of a contract leave a gap to be filled. Given their basic attachment to contractual freedom, the courts are reluctant to override express terms for contracting parties. This is especially true where the contracting parties are large and sophisticated businesses who have negotiated, often with extensive legal input, comprehensive and detailed contract terms between them.. Legislation can also be a source of implied terms, and may be overridden by agreement of the parties, or have a compulsory character. For contracts in general, individualised terms are implied (terms "implied in fact") to reflect the "reasonable expectations of the parties", and like the process of interpretation, implication of a term of a commercial contract must follow from its commercial setting. In Equitable Life Assurance Society v Hyman the House of Lords held (in a notorious decision) that "guaranteed annuity rate" policy holders of the life insurance company could not have their bonus rates lowered by the directors, when the company was in financial difficulty, if it would undermine all the policy holders' "reasonable expectations". Lord Steyn said that a term should be implied in the policy contract that the directors' discretion was limited, as this term was "strictly necessary... essential to give effect to the reasonable expectations of the parties". This objective, contextual formulation of the test for individualised implied terms represents a shift from the older and subjective formulation of the implied term test, asking like an "officious bystander" what the parties "would have contracted for" if they had applied their minds to a gap in the contract. In AG of Belize v Belize Telecom Ltd, Lord Hoffmann in the Privy Council added that the process of implication is to be seen as part of the overall process of interpretation: designed to fulfill the reasonable expectations of the parties in their context. The custom of the trade may also be a source of an implied term, if it is "certain, notorious, reasonable, recognised as legally binding and consistent with the express terms".

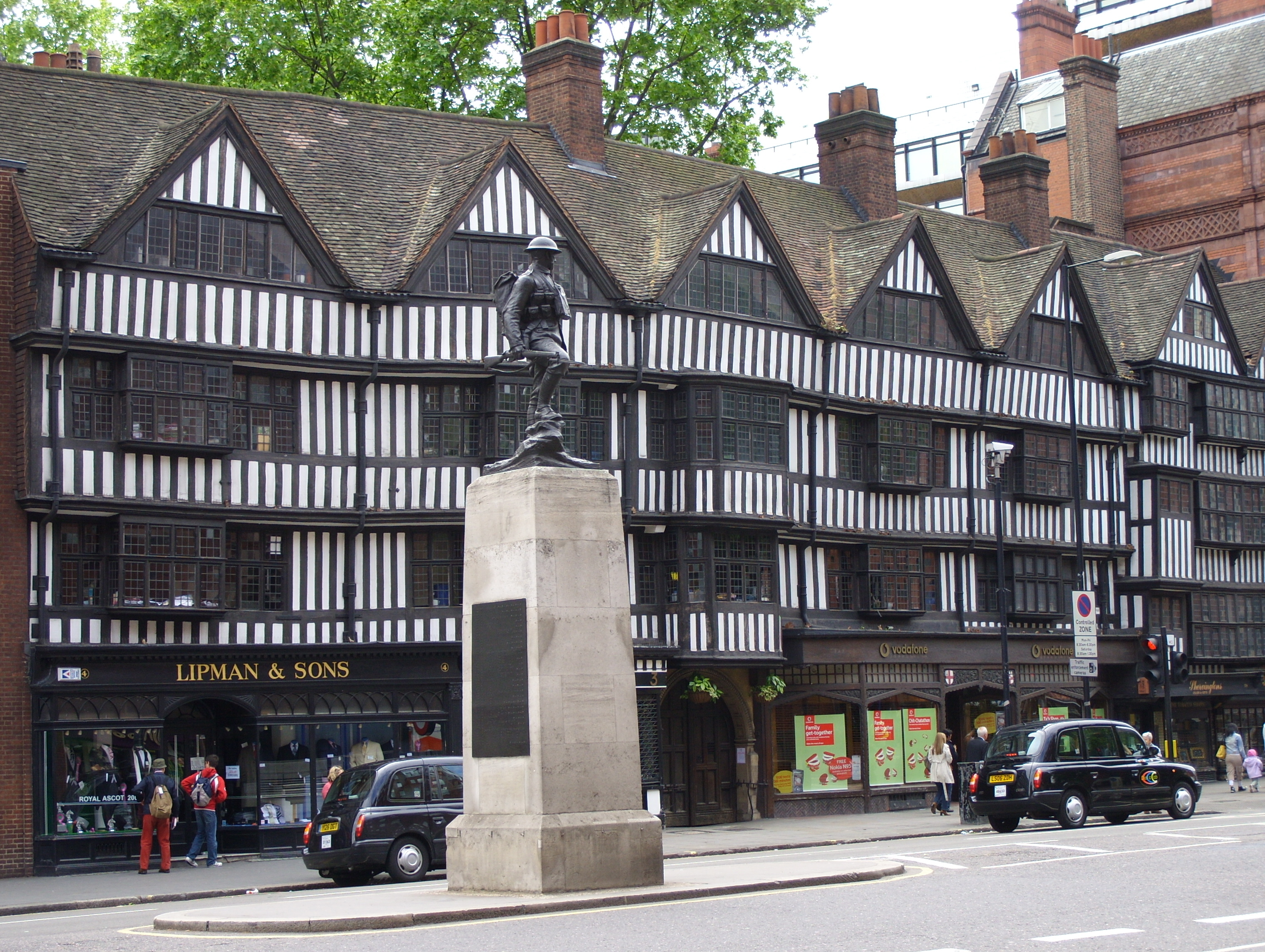
The leading case on implied terms, Equitable Life Assurance Society v Hyman, held individualised terms are implied when essential to reflect the parties' "reasonable expectations". The Equitable Life directors defeated their customers expectations, and this ultimately led to its collapse. Its archives are now housed at Staple Inn, Holborn.

In specific contracts, such as those for sales of goods, between a landlord and tenant, or in employment, the courts imply standardised contractual terms (or terms "implied in law"). Such terms set out a menu of "default rules" that generally apply in absence of true agreement to the contrary. In one instance of partial codification, the Sale of Goods Act 1893 summed up all the standard contractual provisions in typical commercial sales agreements developed by the common law. This is now updated in the Sale of Goods Act 1979, and in default of people agreeing something different in general its terms will apply. For instance, under section 12–14, any contract for sale of goods carries the implied terms that the seller has legal title, that it will match prior descriptions and that it is of satisfactory quality and fit for purpose. Similarly the Supply of Goods and Services Act 1982 section 13 says services must be performed with reasonable care and skill. As a matter of common law the test is what terms are a "necessary incident" to the specific type of contract in question. This test derives from Liverpool City Council v Irwin where the House of Lords held that, although fulfilled on the facts of the case, a landlord owes a duty to tenants in a block of flats to keep the common parts in reasonable repair. In employment contracts, multiple standardised implied terms arise also, even before statute comes into play, for instance to give employees adequate information to make a judgement about how to take advantage of their pension entitlements. The primary standardised employment term is that both employer and worker owe one another an obligation of "mutual trust and confidence". Mutual trust and confidence can be undermined in multiple ways, primarily where an employer's repulsive conduct means a worker can treat herself as being constructively dismissed. In Mahmud and Malik v Bank of Credit and Commerce International SA the House of Lords held the duty was breached by the employer running the business as a cover for numerous illegal activities. The House of Lords has repeated that the term may always be excluded, but this has been disputed because unlike a contract for goods or services among commercial parties, an employment relation is characterised by unequal bargaining power between employer and worker. In Johnstone v Bloomsbury Health Authority the Court of Appeal all held that a junior doctor could not be made to work at an average of 88 hours a week, even though this was an express term of his contract, where it would damage his health. However, one judge said that result followed from application of the Unfair Contract Terms Act 1977, one judge said it was because at common law express terms could be construed in the light of implied terms, and one judge said implied terms may override express terms. Even in employment, or in consumer affairs, English courts remain divided about the extent to which they should depart from the basic paradigm of contractual freedom, that is, in absence of legislation.

=== Unfair terms ===
"None of you nowadays will remember the trouble we had – when I was called to the Bar – with exemption clauses. They were printed in small print on the back of tickets and order forms and invoices. They were contained in catalogues or timetables. They were held to be binding on any person who took them without objection. No one ever did object. He never read them or knew what was in them. No matter how unreasonable they were, he was bound. All this was done in the name of "freedom of contract." But the freedom was all on the side of the big concern which had the use of the printing press. No freedom for the little man who took the ticket or order form or invoice. The big concern said, "Take it or leave it." The little man had no option but to take it.... When the courts said to the big concern, "You must put it in clear words," the big concern had no hesitation in doing so. It knew well that the little man would never read the exemption clauses or understand them. It was a bleak winter for our law of contract."

— Lord Denning MR in George Mitchell Ltd v Finney Lock Seeds Ltd [1982] EWCA Civ 5

In the late 20th century, Parliament passed its first comprehensive incursion into the doctrine of contractual freedom in the Unfair Contract Terms Act 1977. The topic of unfair terms is vast, and could equally include specific contracts falling under the Consumer Credit Act 1974, the Employment Rights Act 1996 or the Landlord and Tenant Act 1985. Legislation, particularly regarding consumer protection, is also frequently being updated by the European Union, in laws like the Flight Delay Compensation Regulation, or the Electronic Commerce Directive, which are subsequently translated into domestic law through a statutory instrument authorised through the European Communities Act 1972 section 2(2), as for example with the Consumer Protection (Distance Selling) Regulations 2000. The primary legislation on unfair consumer contract terms deriving from the EU is found in the Consumer Rights Act 2015. The Law Commission had drafted a unified Unfair Contract Terms Bill, but Parliament chose to maintain two extensive documents.

The Unfair Contract Terms Act 1977 regulates clauses that exclude or limit terms implied by the common law or statute. Its general pattern is that if clauses restrict liability, particularly negligence, of one party, the clause must pass the "reasonableness test" in section 11 and Schedule 2. This looks at the ability of either party to get insurance, their bargaining power and their alternatives for supply, and a term's transparency. In places the Act goes further. Section 2(1) strikes down any term that would limit liability for a person's death or personal injury. Section 2(2) stipulates that any clause restricting liability for loss to property has to pass the "reasonableness test". One of the first cases, George Mitchell Ltd v Finney Lock Seeds Ltd saw a farmer successfully claim that a clause limiting the liability of a cabbage seed seller to damages for replacement seed, rather than the far greater loss of profits after crop failure, was unreasonable. The sellers were in a better position to get insurance for the loss than the buyers. Under section 3 businesses cannot limit their liability for breach of contract if they are dealing with "consumers", defined in section 12 as someone who is not dealing in the course of business with someone who is, or if they are using a written standard form contract, unless the term passes the reasonableness test. Section 6 states the implied terms of the Sale of Goods Act 1979 cannot be limited unless reasonable. If one party is a "consumer" then the SGA 1979 terms become compulsory under the CRA 2015. In other words, a business can never sell a consumer goods that do not work, even if the consumer signed a document with full knowledge of the exclusion clause. Under section 13, it is added that variations on straightforward exemption clauses will still count as exemption clauses caught by the Act. So for example, in Smith v Eric S Bush the House of Lords held that a surveyor's term limiting liability for negligence was ineffective, after the chimney came crashing through Mr Smith's roof. The surveyor could get insurance more easily than Mr Smith. Even though there was no contract between them, because section 1(1)(b) applies to any notice excluding liability for negligence, and even though the surveyor's exclusion clause might prevent a duty of care arising at common law, section 13 "catches" it if liability would exist "but for" the notice excluding liability: then the exclusion is potentially unfair.

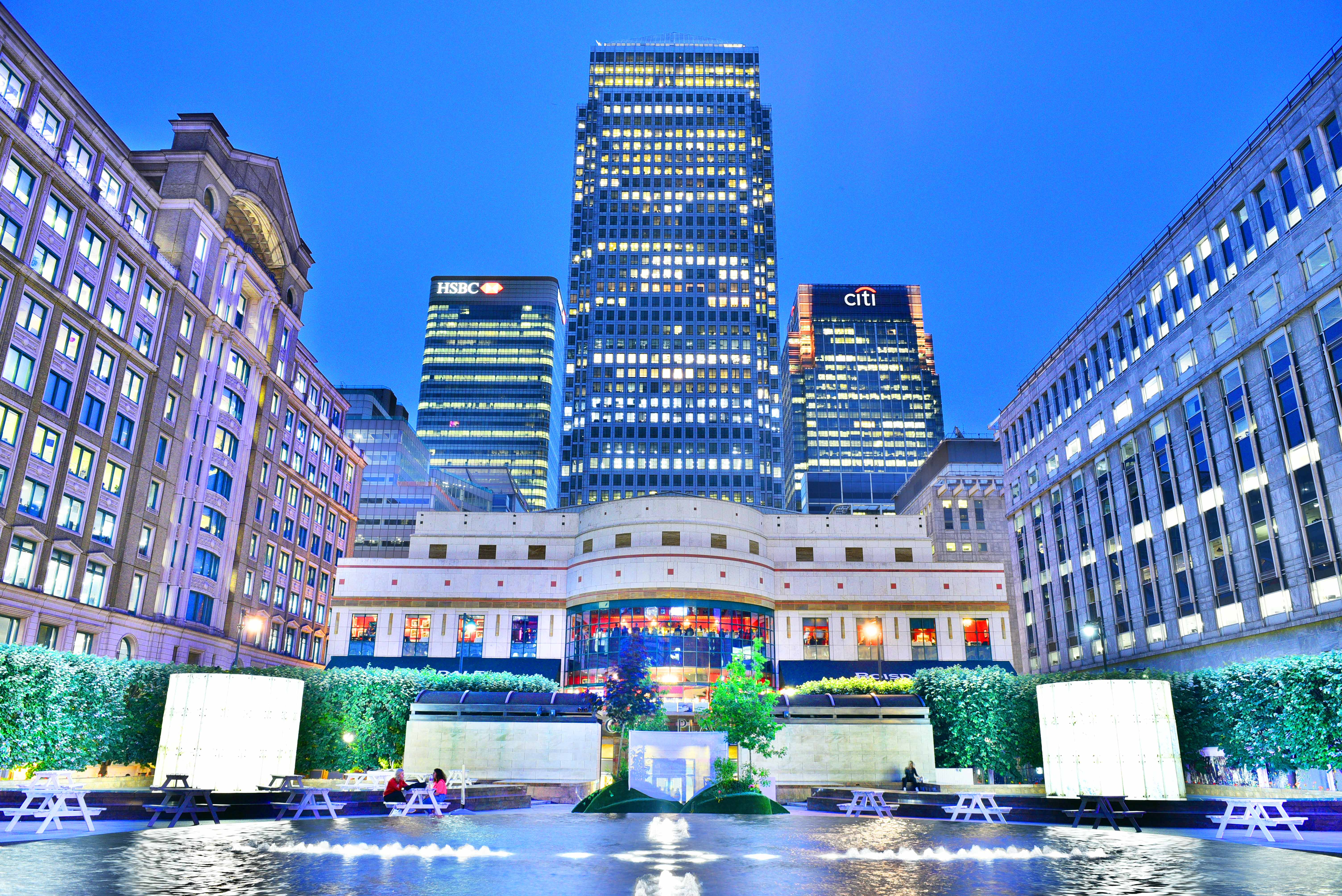
The Competition and Markets Authority in Canary Wharf can take up consumer protection cases after receiving complaints. It has done very few.

Relatively few cases are ever brought directly by consumers, given the complexity of litigation, cost, and its worth if claims are small. In order to ensure consumer protection laws are actually enforced, the Competition and Markets Authority has jurisdiction to bring consumer regulation cases on behalf of consumers after receiving complaints. Under the Consumer Rights Act 2015 section 70 and Schedule 3, the CMA has jurisdiction to collect and consider complaints, and then seek injunctions in the courts to stop businesses using unfair terms (under any legislation). The CRA 2015 is formally broader than UCTA 1977 in that it covers any unfair terms, not just exemption clauses, but narrower in that it only operates for consumer contracts. Under section 2, a consumer is an "individual acting for purposes that are wholly or mainly outside that individual's trade, business, craft or profession." However, while the United Kingdom could always opt for greater protection, when it translated the Directive into national law it opted to follow the bare minimum requirements, and not to cover every contract term. Under section 64, a court may only assess the fairness of terms that do not specify "the main subject matter of the contract", or terms which relate to "appropriateness of the price payable" of the thing sold. Outside such "core" terms, a term may be unfair, under section 62 if it is not one that is individually negotiated, and if contrary to good faith it causes a significant imbalance in the rights and obligations of the parties. A list of examples of unfair terms are set out in Schedule 2. In DGFT v First National Bank plc the House of Lords held that given the purpose of consumer protection, the predecessor to section 64 should be construed tightly and Lord Bingham stated good faith implies fair, open and honest dealing. This all meant that the bank's practice of charging its (higher) default interest rate to customers who had (lower) interest rate set by a court under a debt restructuring plan could be assessed for fairness, but the term did not create such an imbalance given the bank wished only to have its normal interest. This appeared to grant a relatively open role for the Office of Fair Trading to intervene against unfair terms. However, in OFT v Abbey National plc the Supreme Court held that if a term related in any way to price, it could not by virtue of section 64 be assessed for fairness. All the High Street banks, including Abbey National, had a practice of charging high fees if account holders, unplanned, exceeded through withdrawals their normal overdraft limit. Overturning a unanimous Court of Appeal, the Supreme Court viewed that if the thing being charged for was part of a "package" of services, and the bank's remuneration for its services partly came from these fees, then there could be no assessment of the fairness of terms. This controversial stance was tempered by their Lordships' emphasis that any charges must be wholly transparent, though its compatibility with EU law is not yet established by the European Court of Justice, and it appears questionable that it would be decided the same way if inequality of bargaining power had been taken into account, as the Directive requires.

== Termination and remedies ==
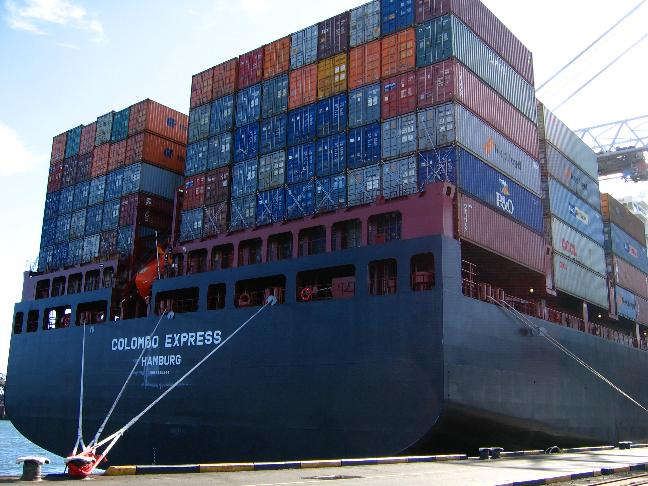
Clauses governing when a contract can be terminated, and what remedies are available are particularly important in commercial contracts, such as for shipping and the sale of goods, to achieve business certainty.

Although promises are made to be kept, parties to an agreement are generally free to determine how a contract is terminated, can be terminated and remedial consequences for breach of contract, just as they can generally determine a contract's content. The courts have fashioned only residual limits on the parties' autonomy to determine how a contract terminates. The courts' default, or standard rules, which are generally alterable, are first that a contract is automatically concluded if it becomes impossible for one party to perform. Second, if one party breaches her side of the bargain in a serious way, the other party may cease his own performance. If a breach is not serious, the innocent party must continue his own obligations but may claim a remedy in court for the defective or imprecise performance he has received. Third, the principle remedy for breach of contract is compensatory damages, limited to losses that one might reasonably expect to result from a breach. This means a sum of money to put the claimant in mostly the same position as if the contract breaker had performed her obligations. In a small number of contract cases, closely analogous to property or trust obligations, a court may order restitution by the contract breaker so that any gains she has made by breaking the agreement will be stripped and given to the innocent party. Additionally where a contract's substance is for something so unique that damages would be an inadequate remedy courts may use their discretion to grant an injunction against the contract breaker doing something or, unless it is a personal service, positively order specific performance of the contract terms.

=== Performance and breach ===
Generally speaking, all parties to a contract must precisely perform their obligations or there is a breach of contract and, at the least, damages can be claimed. However, as a starting point, to claim that someone else has breached their side of a bargain, one must have at least "substantially performed" their own obligations. For example, in Sumpter v Hedges a builder performed £333 worth of work, but then abandoned completion of the contract. The Court of Appeal held he could not recover any money for the building left on the land, even though the buyer subsequently used the foundations to complete the job. This rule provides a powerful remedy in home construction cases to a customer. So in Bolton v Mahadeva Mr Bolton installed a £560 heating system in Mahadeva's house. However, it leaked and would cost £174 to correct (i.e. 31% of the price). Mahadeva did not pay at all, and the Court of Appeal held this was lawful because the performance was so defective that there could not be said to be any substantial performance. However where an obligation in a contract is "substantially performed", the full sum must be paid, only then deducting an amount to reflect the breach. So in Hoenig v Isaacs Denning LJ held a builder who installed a bookcase poorly, with a price of £750 but costing only £55 to correct (i.e. 7.3% of the price), had to be paid minus the cost of correction. If a contract's obligations are construed as consisting of an "entire obligation", performance of it all will be a condition precedent (a requirement before) to performance from the other side falling due, and allowing a breach of contract claim.

In the simplest case of a contractual breach, the performance that was owed will merely be the payment of a provable debt (an agreed sum of money). In this case, the Sale of Goods Act 1979 section 49 allows for a summary action for price of goods or services, meaning a quick set of court procedure rules are followed. Consumers also benefit under sections 48A-E, with a specific right to have a broken product to be repaired. An added benefit is that if a claimant brings an action for debt, she or he will have no further duty to mitigate his loss. This was another requirement that common law courts had invented, before a claim for breach of contract could be enforced. For instance, in contracts for services that spanned a long period of time (e.g. 5 years), the courts would often state that because a claimant should be able to find alternative work in a few months, and so should not receive money for the whole contract's duration. However, White & Carter (Councils) Ltd v McGregor an advertising company had a contract to display adverts for McGregor's garage business on public dustbins. McGregor said he wished to cancel the deal, but White & Carter Ltd refused, displayed the adverts anyway, and demanded the full sum of money. McGregor argued that they should have attempted to mitigate their loss by finding other clients, but the majority of the Lords held there was no further duty to mitigate. Claims in debt were different from damages.

Remedies are often agreed in a contract, so that if one side fails to perform the contract will dictate what happens. A simple, common and automatic remedy is to have taken a deposit, and to retain it in the event of non-performance. However, the courts will often treat any deposit that exceeds 10 per cent of the contract price as excessive. A special justification will be required before any greater sum may be retained as a deposit. The courts will view a large deposit, even if expressed in crystal clear language, as a part payment of the contract which if unperformed must be restored in order to prevent unjust enrichment. Nevertheless, where commercial parties of equal bargaining power wish to insist on circumstances in which a deposit will be forfeit and insist precisely on the letter of their deal, the courts will not interfere. In Union Eagle Ltd v Golden Achievement Ltd a purchaser of a building in Hong Kong for HK$4.2 million had a contract stipulating completion must take place by 5 pm on 30 September 1991 and that if not a 10 per cent deposit would be forfeited and the contract rescinded. The purchaser was 10 minutes late only, but the Privy Council advised that given the necessity of certain rules and to remove business' fear of courts exercising unpredictable discretion, the agreement would be strictly enforced. Agreements may also state that, as opposed to a sum fixed by the courts, a particular sum of "liquidated damages" will be paid upon non-performance. The courts place an outer-limit on liquidated damages clauses if they became so high, or "extravagant and unconscionable" as to look like a penalty. Penalty clauses in contracts are generally not enforceable. However this jurisdiction is exercised rarely, so in Murray v Leisureplay plc the Court of Appeal held that a severance payment of a whole year's salary to a company's Chief Executive in the event of dismissal before a year was not a penalty clause. The recent decision of Cavendish Square Holding BV v Talal El Makdessi, together with its companion case ParkingEye Ltd v Beavis, decided that the test for whether a clause is unenforceable by virtue of it being a penalty clause is 'whether the impugned provision is a secondary obligation which imposes a detriment on the contract-breaker out of all proportion to any legitimate interest of the innocent party in the enforcement of the primary obligation'. This means that even though a sum is not a genuine pre-estimate of loss, it is not a penalty if it protects a legitimate interest of the claimant in the performance of the contract and is not out of proportion in doing so. In ParkingEye, legitimate interests had included maintaining the good will of the parking company and encouraging a prompt turnover of the car parking spaces. Additionally, the ability of courts to strike down clauses as penalties only applies to clauses for payment of money upon the breach of the contract rather than events during its performance, though the Unfair Terms in Consumer Contracts Regulations 1999 confers jurisdiction to interfere with unfair terms used against consumers.

=== Frustration and common mistake ===
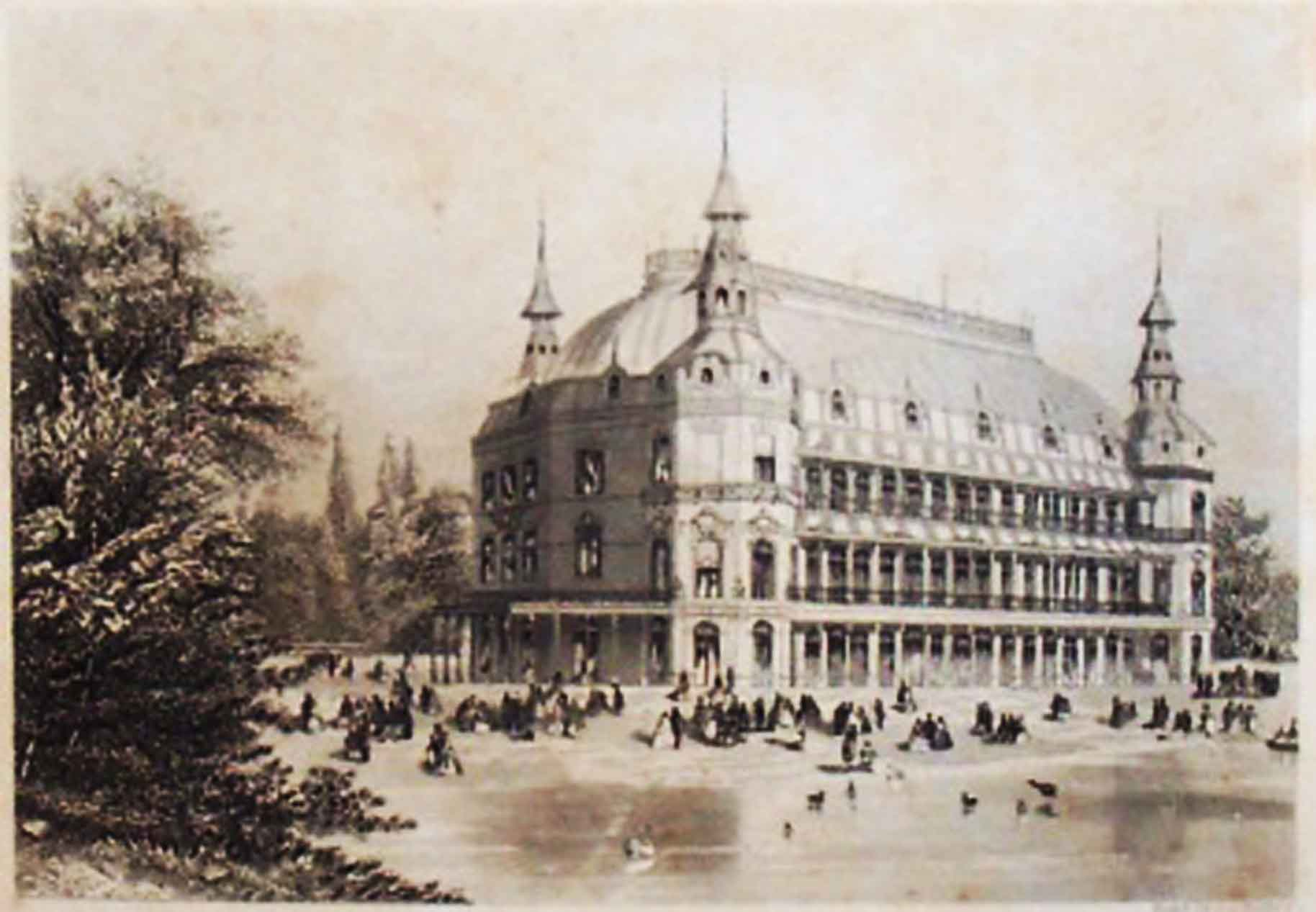
The burning down of the Surrey Music Hall in Taylor v Caldwell frustrated the contract to hire it.

Early common law cases held that performance of a contract always had to take place. No matter what hardship was encountered contracting parties had absolute liability on their obligations. In the 19th century the courts developed a doctrine that contracts which became impossible to perform would be frustrated and automatically come to an end. In Taylor v Caldwell Blackburn J held that when the Surrey Gardens Music Hall unexpectedly burnt down, the owners did not have to pay compensation to the business that had leased it for an extravagant performance, because it was neither party's fault. An assumption underlying all contracts (a "condition precedent") is that they are possible to perform. People would not ordinarily contract to do something they knew was going to be impossible. Apart from physical impossibility, frustration could be down to a contract becoming illegal to perform, for instance if war breaks out and the government bans trade to a belligerent country, or perhaps if the whole purpose of an agreement is destroyed by another event, like renting a room to watch a cancelled coronation parade. But a contract is not frustrated merely because a subsequent event makes the agreement harder to perform than expected, as for instance in Davis Contractors Ltd v Fareham UDC where a builder unfortunately had to spend more time and money doing a job than he would be paid for because of an unforeseen shortage of labour and supplies. The House of Lords denied his claim for contract to be declared frustrated so he could claim quantum meruit. Because the doctrine of frustration is a matter of construction of the contract, it can be contracted around, through what are called "force majeure" clauses. Similarly, a contract can have a force majeure clause that would bring a contract to an end more easily than would common law construction. In The Super Servant Two Wijsmuller BV contracted to hire out a self-propelling barge to J. Lauritzen A/S, who wanted to tow another ship from Japan to Rotterdam, but had a provision stating the contract would terminate if some event made it difficult related to the 'perils or dangers and accidents of the sea'. Wijsmuller BV also had a choice of whether to provide either The Superservant One or Two. They chose Two and it sank. The Court of Appeal held that the impossibility to perform the agreement was down to Wijsmuller's own choice, and so it was not frustrated, but that the force majeure clause did cover it. The effect of a contract being frustrated is that it is that both parties are prospectively discharged from performing their side of the bargain. If one side has already paid money over or conferred another valuable benefit, but not got anything in return yet, contrary to the prior common law position, the Law Reform (Frustrated Contracts) Act 1943 gives the court discretion to let the claimant recover a 'just sum', and that means whatever the court thinks fit in all the circumstances.

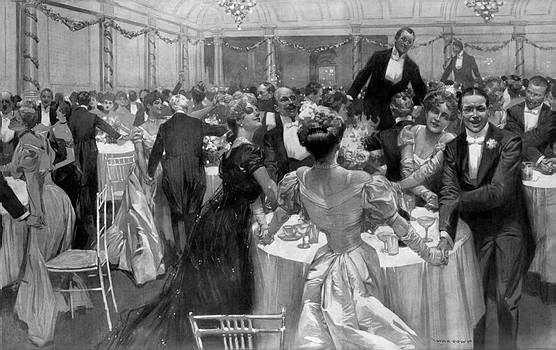
In Bell v Lever Bros Ltd, a golden parachute deal struck over dinner at the Savoy Hotel was held to still be enforceable despite a mistake about the crooked director's involvement in a cartel.

A related doctrine is "common mistake", which since the decision of Lord Phillips MR in The Great Peace is essentially the same in operation as frustration, except that the event making a contract impossible to perform takes place before, not after, a contract is concluded. A "common mistake" differs from the "mistakes" that take place between offers and acceptance (that mean there is no agreement in the first place), or the so-called "mistake about identity" cases that follow from a fraudulent misrepresentation (which typically makes a contract voidable, not void, unless in a written document and concluded at a distance), because it is based on performance becoming seriously difficult to perform. For instance, in Courturier v Hastie a corn shipment had decayed by the time two businesspeople had contracted for it, and so it was held (perhaps controversially) that the seller was not liable, because it was always physically impossible. And in Cooper v Phibbs the House of Lords held that an agreement to lease out a fishery was void because it turned out the lessee was in fact the owner. It is legally impossible to be leased something one owns. Again, the doctrine of common mistake may be contracted around, so in McRae v Commonwealth Disposals Commission it was held that despite the fact that a wrecked ship off the Great Barrier Reef never in fact existed, because a salvage business was actually promised by the Australian government that it was there, there was no common mistake. Like frustration, the doctrine operates only in narrow confines. In Bell v Lever Bros Ltd Lord Atkin stated that a mistake must be of such a 'fundamental character as to constitute an underlying assumption without which the parties would not have entered into the agreements'. Post-war, Denning LJ added to the doctrine, beyond its narrow legal confines, in line with the more permissive approach recognised throughout civil law countries, most of the Commonwealth and the United States. In Solle v Butcher he held that in equity a contract could be deemed voidable (rather than outright void) if it would be 'unconscientious' for a court to hold someone to a bargain. This gave the courts some flexibility in the kind of remedy they would grant, and could be more generous in the circumstances they allowed escape. But in The Great Peace, Lord Phillips MR said that this more permissive doctrine had been contrary to the House of Lords authority in Bell v Lever Bros Ltd. Although it probably would not have been avoidable under the mistake in equity doctrine anyway, Lord Phillips MR held that a rescue company could not escape from an agreement to save a ship because both parties were mistaken that the distressed vessel was further than they originally thought. The result is that English contract law jealously prevents escape from an agreement, unless there is a serious breach because of the conduct of one party, which gives rise to the right to terminate.

=== Termination ===
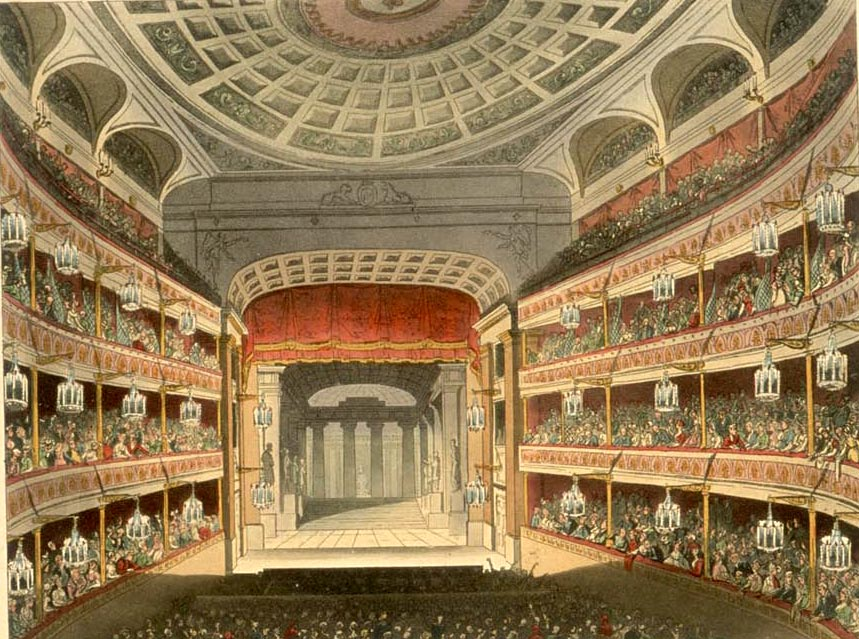
The third in a trilogy of cases involving Frederick Gye's colourful tenure as the Royal Opera House manager, Bettini v Gye held the right to terminate is a question of construction.

The main way contracts are brought to an untimely end is when one party does not perform the major primary obligations on their side of the bargain, which is a repudiatory breach of contract. As a rule, if a breach is small the other party must still go ahead and perform his obligations, but will then be able to claim compensation, or a "secondary obligation" from the party in breach. If, however, the breach is very big, "fundamental" or goes "to the root of the contract", then the innocent party gets the right to elect to terminate his own performance for the future. The same goes where one party makes clear they have no intention of performing their side of the bargain, in an "anticipatory repudiation", so the innocent party can go straight to court to claim a remedy, rather than waiting till the contract's date for performance which never arrives. The test for whether a term's breach will allow for termination essentially depends on construction of the contract's terms as a whole by the court, following the same rules as for any other term. In Bettini v Gye, Blackburn J held that although an opera singer arrived 4 days late for rehearsals, given that the contract was to last three and a half months, and only the first week of performance would be slightly affected, the Opera House owner was not entitled to turn the singer away. The opera owner could have withheld some payment to reflect his loss from the breach, but should have let the show go on. The intentions of the parties manifested in the contract showed that such a breach was not so serious as to give rise to the right to terminate. As Lord Wilberforce said in The Diana Prosperity the Court must, 'place itself in thought in the same factual matrix as that in which the parties were.'

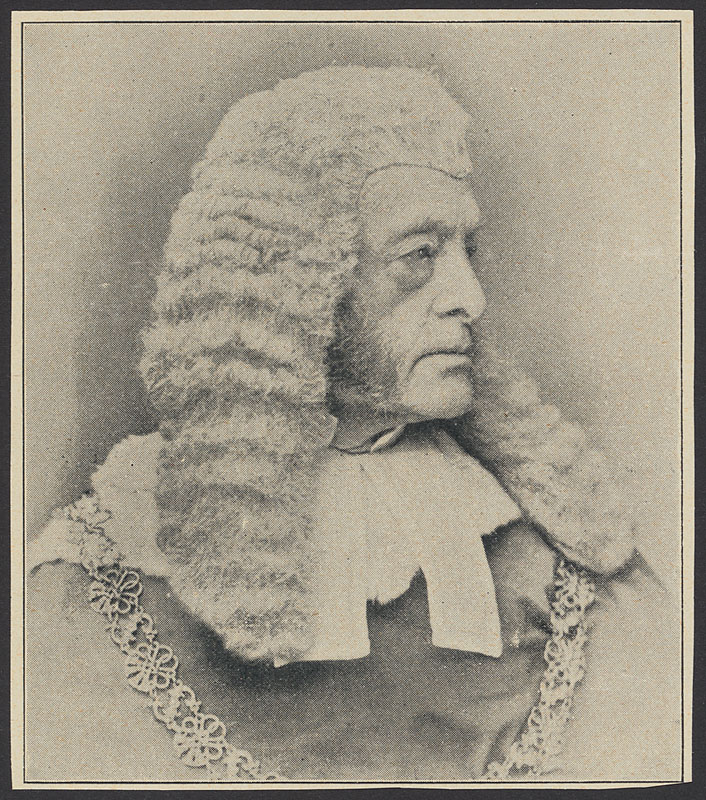
Inspired by Frederick Pollock, the drafter of the Sale of Goods Act 1893 and the Marine Insurance Act 1906, Mackenzie Chalmers distinguished conditions and warranties as two main kinds of term.

While when a contract is silent a court must essentially make an informed choice about whether a right to terminate should exist, if a contract deals with the matter the courts' general approach is to follow the parties' wishes. The drafters of the old Sale of Goods Act 1893 distinguished between "conditions" (major terms, which when breached confer a right to terminate) and "warranties" (minor terms, which do not), and under the present Sale of Goods Act 1979 some terms, such as descriptions about quality, are conditions by default. A third kind is an "innominate term", which is typically a vague term like citrus pulp pellets being "in good condition", or a ship having to be "seaworthy". Because such a term could be breached in both a major way (e.g. the ship sinks) or a trivial way (e.g. a lifejacket is missing) the court will determine whether the right to terminate arises based on how serious in fact the consequences of the breach were. So in The Hong Kong Fir, Lord Diplock held that a ship crew being too incompetent to properly operate the vessel did not breach the contract's "seaworthiness" term in a serious enough way as to allow for termination, because the charterers still got a working boat and could have replaced the crew. If a contract specifies that a particular obligation is a "condition" the dominant approach of the courts is to treat it as such. Nevertheless, concerned with the ability of a stronger party to specify the terms it finds most convenient as "conditions" at the expense of the weaker, courts retain the ability to construe an agreement contra proferentum. In L Schuler AG v Wickman Machine Tool Sales Ltd the majority of the House of Lords held that clause 7 of a contract, stating it was "a condition of this agreement" that Mr Wickman would visit 6 major car companies "at least once in every week" to try selling panel presses, was not really a condition in the technical sense. So when Mr Wickman was found to have visited much less, Schuler AG could not dismiss him. This was because clause 11 said that 60 days of warning was needed before Schuler AG could terminate, so the whole contract read together meant the clause 7 had to be subject to clause 11. The language in the contract is not decisive. If the word "condition" is not used, but the contract describes a right to terminate, such as the contract being terminable for "any breach" of obligation, the issue is, again, one of construction and the courts may be reluctant to give effect to the plain meaning if it would have "draconian consequences" for the weaker party. By contrast, in Bunge Corporation v Tradax SA the House of Lords held that giving notice for a ship to start loading the soya bean cargo four days late, when the contract expressly stipulated the date, should allow the right to terminate regardless of the actual consequences of the breach. In mercantile contracts, 'broadly speaking time will be considered of the essence', and so it is highly likely the courts will enforce obligations to the letter.

=== Damages and injunctions ===
Whether or not a contract is terminated, every breach of a substantially performed contract gives rise to the right to a remedy. A court's power to award remedies is the final sanction against non-performance and, unless the defendant is insolvent, the objective is to achieve full compensation for the innocent party as if the contract were performed. This measure of the remedy to protect "expectations" forms a principal distinction between contracts as obligations from torts or unjust enrichment. In cases where performance is defective, the courts generally award money for the cost of curing the defect, unless the sum would be disproportionate and another sum would adequately achieve the same compensatory objective. In Ruxley Electronics Ltd v Forsyth although a £17,797 swimming pool was built 18 inches too shallow, the land's market value was exactly the same. The House of Lords' solution, rather than awarding the cost of rebuilding it at £21,560 and rather than reject any award at all, was to reflect the forgone "consumer surplus" or the "loss of amenity" with an award of £2,500. Greater recognition of benefits in contracts other than purely financial ones has also been seen in cases concerning contracts where pleasure, enjoyment, relaxation or the avoidance of stress are construed as being "important terms". In Jarvis v Swans Tours Ltd Lord Denning MR held that a council worker could get not just his money back, but also a small sum to reflect his disappointment after his dream-holiday to the Swiss Alps, contrary to the promises in Swan Tours' travel brochure, proved a boring disaster, complete with sub-standard yodelling. And in Farley v Skinner the House of Lords held that a homebuyer close to Gatwick airport could recover money for lack of peaceful enjoyment, and the disruption of what would otherwise be his "quiet contemplative breakfast" from the house surveyor who assured there would be no noise. The market value of the property was unchanged, but ensuring peace and quiet had been an important term in their agreement. The courts have, however, remained reluctant to allow recovery for disappointment over any breach of contract, particularly in employment where a flood of people might claim damages for stress and upset after a wrongful dismissal.

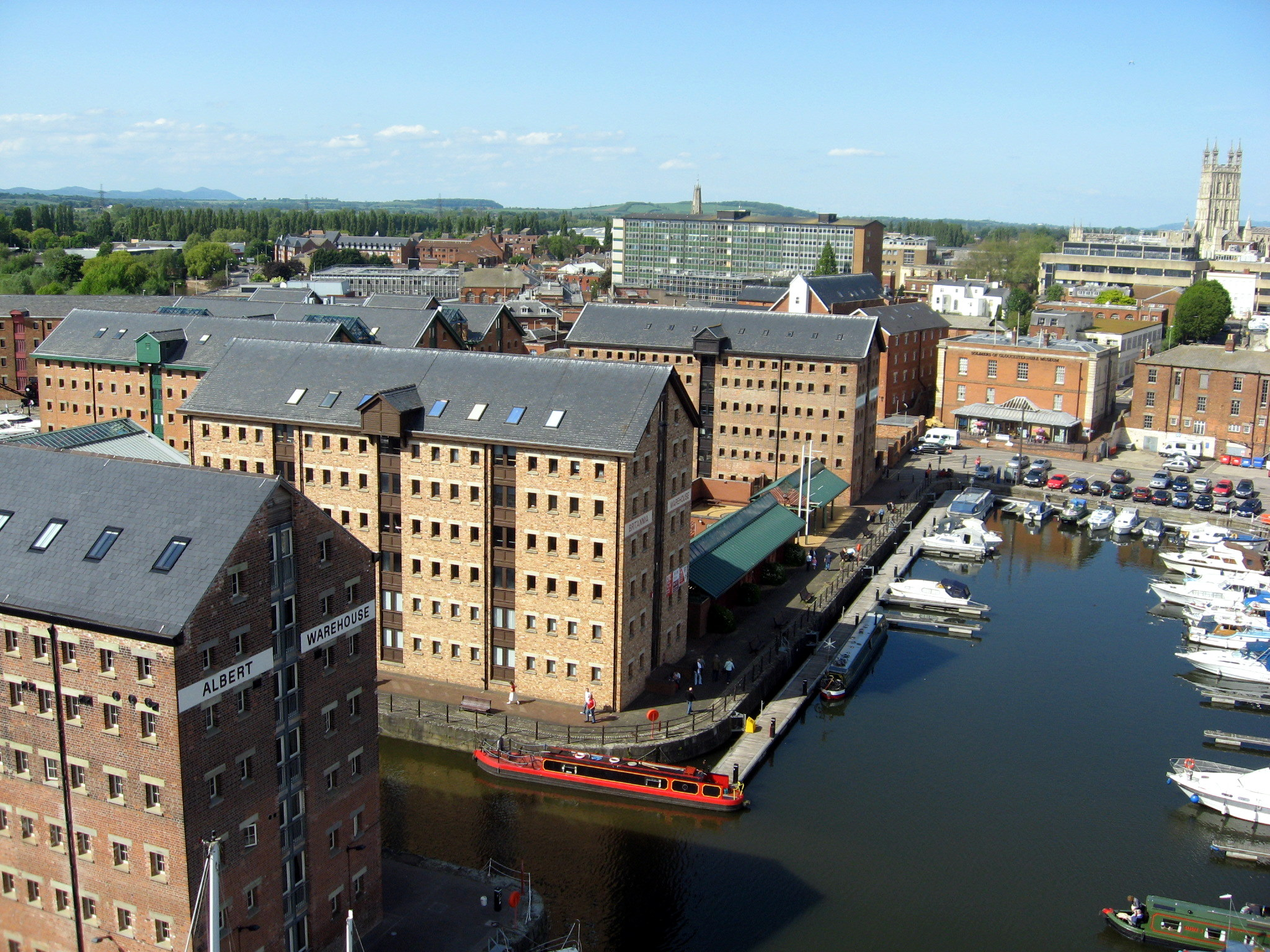
The famous case of Hadley v Baxendale about the lost profits of a flour miller at Gloucester's docks, was updated in The Achilleas, so the extent of damages reflect the "background of market expectations".

In addition to damages for not getting the thing promised itself, a contract breaker must compensate for the costly consequences of the breach that one would reasonably expect to exist. There must be a causal connection between the breach and the consequence complained of. In Saamco v York Montague Ltd it was held a bank could not recover damages from property valuer for all of the difference in what the properties it bought after getting the valuations were assured to be and actual property values, because a large part of the difference resulted from generally depressed market prices following "Black Wednesday" in 1992. In a business deal, calculation will typically be based on the forgone profits that one could reasonably have expected to make. This could also include the "loss of a chance" to profit, so in Chaplin v Hicks an entrant in a beauty contest wrongfully excluded from the final round was awarded 25% of the final prize money to reflect her 1 in 4 chance of having won. One limit lies at consequential losses that are too "remote", or are not a natural result of the breach, and are not in the parties' contemplation. In Hadley v Baxendale a miller tried to recover damages from Baxendale's delivery company for the lost profits from his mill grinding to a halt, after they were late delivering a crankshaft back from being fixed. But Alderson B held that because millers would usually be expected to keep spare crank shafts, and because he had not informed Baxendale of the importance of the timely delivery, an award for profits could not be compensated. More recently in The Achilleas the majority of the House of Lords preferred to express the remoteness rule as one of construing the contract to reflect the parties' "background of market expectations". Transfield Shipping returned The Achilleas late to its owner, Mercator, which led Mercator to lose a lucrative contract with Cargill that would make over $1.3 million, an occurrence that was plainly a natural consequence of the breach and easily foreseeable. Yet because the standard practice and expectation in the shipping industry was that if a ship were returned late only the ordinary sum for hire would be due, this was the limit on recovery. It is also possible to lose one's entitlement to damages if steps are not taken to mitigate further losses, that any prudent person would, rather than sitting back and letting losses run up. But the burden of proof of a failure to mitigate is on a contract breaker, to whom the courts are unlikely to be sympathetic. A contract breaker could may also, if a concurrent liability arises in tort, argue a claimant's damages should be reduced to reflect their contributory fault, and the courts can reduce an award to achieve a just and equitable result. Sometimes potential profits will be too uncertain, or a general fall in market prices means that even claiming damages for the thing itself would leave one in a negative position, and so the courts allow a claimant to choose whether to sue, not for a failure in expectations, but to cover her expenses in preparing for the contract, or the "reliance interest". In Anglia Television Ltd v Reed a TV channel successfully sued Robert Reed for not turning up for shooting a film. It was unclear whether the film would make any profits at all, and so Anglia TV got compensated for its wasted expenses in preparing the set. The level of damages is generally assessed at the date of the breach, but this is variable if the court thinks another time would be fairer. The claimant has an unfettered right to choose whether to claim for loss of bargain damages (expectation damages) or for wasted expenditure (reliance damages), unless the claimant seeks to recover the wasted expenditure in an attempt to escape the consequences of a bad bargain.

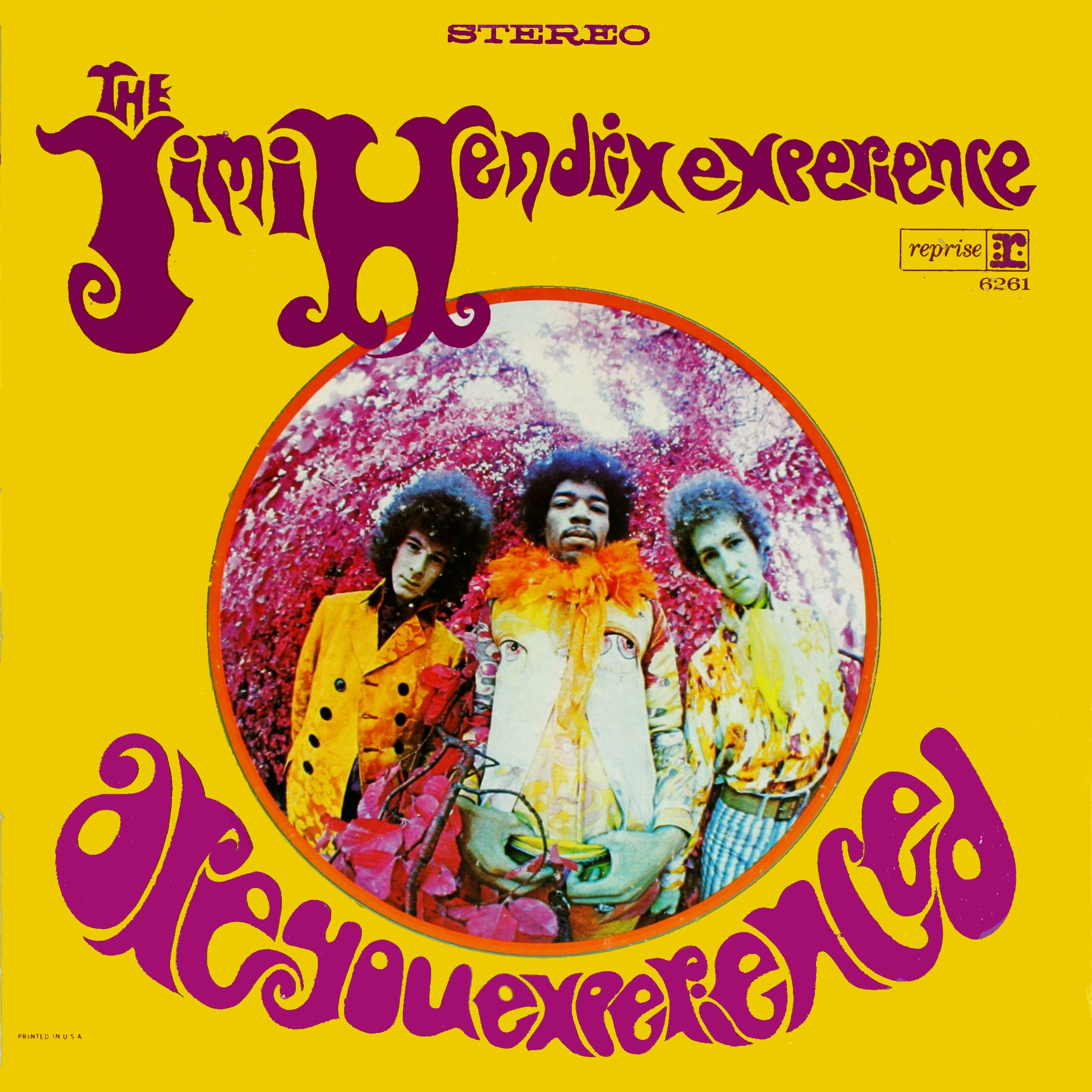
When compensatory damages are an inadequate remedy, restitution may be awarded as where a record company exploited a licence to Jimi Hendrix records in breach of contract.

By way of exception, alternative remedies to compensatory damages are available depending on the contract's nature. If damages would be an inadequate remedy, for instance, because the subject matter was a unique painting, or a piece of land, or was to deliver petrol during an oil crisis, a court may compel literal or specific performance of the contract's terms. It can also compel a defendant to refrain from actions that would continue a breach of contract. Injunctions are discretionary remedies, and so they are not awarded in cases where it might cause hardship, like compelling conveyance of property when it would mean an unexpectedly disabled inhabitant would lose her home. Additionally, the courts have, at least since the Slavery Abolition Act 1833, refused to grant specific performance of contracts involving personal services. This is part of a more general principle that two (potentially hostile) parties to litigation should not be made to work in a long-term relationship. In Cooperative Insurance Ltd v Argyll Ltd although a shop broke its contract with a shopping centre to keep its business operating, and actual performance was important to keep flagship businesses and so attract more customers to the centre generally, specific performance was not granted because compelling a potentially loss making business to keep operating was draconian and probably not capable of being policed by the court. No award can be made which punishes, or makes an example of a defendant, even for a cynical and calculated breach of contract. However, in limited situations, a claimant may succeed in a claim for restitution of the contract breaker's gains, as is routinely available in cases involving trustees or other fiduciaries who profit from transactions where they have a conflict of interest. In the leading case, Attorney General v Blake a former secret service agent's profits from book sales, which recounted government information in breach of Blake's employment contract, were stripped. While Lord Nicholls stated, other than compensatory damages are not an adequate remedy, that "no fixed rules can be prescribed" and their Lordships were eager to not hamper the development of the law, the cases where such awards have been made in contract have all involved some quasi-proprietary element. In an earlier case, Wrotham Park Ltd v Parkside Homes Ltd, Brightman J awarded a percentage of gains resulting from building a lot of homes in breach of a restrictive covenant, based on a sum that the parties would have been likely to contract for had they struck a bargain. More recently in Experience Hendrix LLC v PPX Enterprises Inc Mance LJ held that a percentage of profits made by PPX breaching the intellectual property rights on songs by Jimi Hendrix would have to be paid up. So if in the course of a contract one party is in a position to take advantage of another's rights without their fully informed consent, a restitutionary remedy can be awarded.

== Cancelling the contract ==
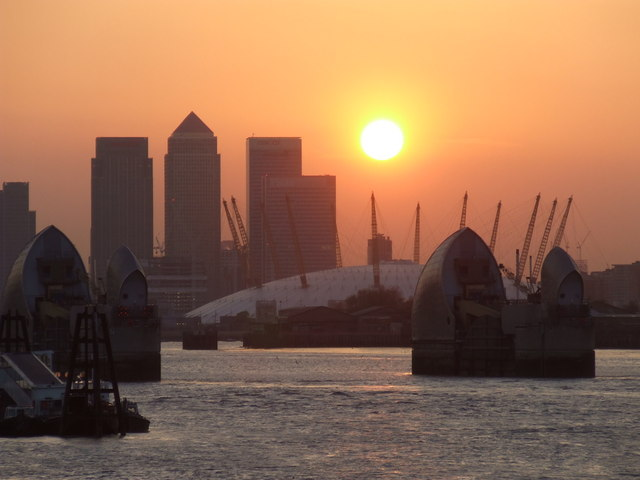
The 2008 financial crisis, like the Great Depression from 1929, began with contract regulation failing to ensure terms were transparent, and permitting unjust exchanges among parties of unequal bargaining power, particularly in consumer credit contracts, and derivative financial contracts. In the 2008 financial crisis, this was derivatives, particularly collateralised debt obligations of mortgage-backed securities, and credit default swaps, whose value ultimately "derived" from people who were unable to pay off unfair mortgage agreements in the United States.

Because contracts concern voluntary obligations, the courts employ a number of protections to ensure only people who give informed and true consent are legally bound. Before 1875, the common law courts only allowed escape from an agreement and damages if someone was induced to enter an agreement by fraud or was put under physical duress, or suffered from a lack of legal capacity. The courts of equity, however, were significantly more generous because they allowed "rescission" (i.e. cancellation) of a contract if a person was the victim of any misrepresentation, even an innocent one, and any "undue influence", beyond influence by physical threats. In these situations the victim of the misrepresentation or unconscionable behaviour has the option to avoid the contract. If avoided, the parties are both entitled to have returned whatever property they had already conveyed, so nobody remains unjustly enriched (though this terminology was not used till the 20th century). As the 20th century unfolded, the courts and statute expanded on the range of circumstances in which a person could claim damages for negligent misrepresentation, on top of fraud. As concern over the use of unfair terms grew, there were calls to recognise a positive duty on contracting parties to disclose material facts as part of a broader duty of "good faith" and some judges attempted to follow the American Uniform Commercial Code by fashioning a broader doctrine of "unconscionable" bargains, procured through inequality of bargaining power. This development was, however, stopped by the House of Lords, so that problems of unfair contract terms continued to be dealt with through targeted legislation. The courts also declare contracts void if they were for an illegal purpose, and refuse to enforce the agreement, or give any legal remedy if doing so would require a person to rely on their illegal act.

=== Disclosure and misrepresentation ===
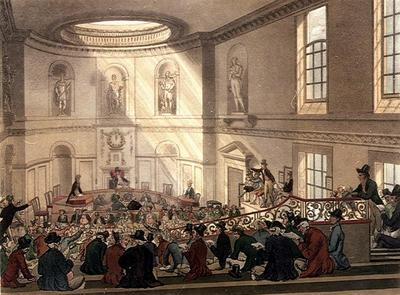
A strict duty of disclosure and good faith applies to selling most financial products, since Carter v Boehm involving insurance for an East India Company fort.

In a specific set of contracts, negotiating parties must conduct themselves in utmost good faith (or "uberrima fides") by disclosing all material facts to one another. In one of the earliest cases, Carter v Boehm, Mr Carter bought an insurance policy for any losses to a naval fort of the British East India Company in Sumatra, but failed to tell his insurer, Boehm, that the fort was only built to resist attacks from locals, and the French were likely to invade. Lord Mansfield held the policy was invalid. Since insurance is a contract based on speculation and the special facts "lie most commonly in the knowledge of the insured only", good faith precluded Mr Carter "concealing what he privately knows". The same policy was extended for sale of shares in a company. So in Erlanger v New Sombrero Phosphate Co the promoter and director-to-be of a guano mining business failed to disclose he had paid for the mining rights on the island of Sombrero half as much as he subsequently was valuing the company at. The House of Lords held that, despite a delay in making a claim, the purchasers of the shares had a right to their money back. Lord Blackburn held, further, that it was no barrier to rescission that the guano could not be put back in the ground. Counter-restitution (i.e. both parties giving back what they had got), if it could be substantially made in its monetary equivalent, was enough. However, outside insurance, partnerships, surety, fiduciary relations, company shares, a narrow range of regulated securities, and consumer credit agreements, the duty on negotiating parties to disclose material facts does not extend to most contracts. Even though there is a duty to correct previous false statements, in Smith v Hughes, it was held that the general duty is merely to not make active misrepresentations.

Hence, in the general law of contract, negotiating parties have a duty to not make false statements of fact or law, or misrepresent themselves through conduct. Statements of opinion, "mere puff" or vague "sales talk" (e.g. "this washing powder will make your clothes whiter than white!"), are generally not considered factual. However representations of people who profess special skill or knowledge are more likely to be actionable, as they warrant their opinions are based on concrete facts. So in Esso Petroleum Co Ltd v Mardon Lord Denning MR held that Esso's expert opinion that a petrol station would have 200,000 gallons worth of business was an actionable misrepresentation. If someone is induced to enter a contract by any misrepresentation, whether fraudulent, negligent or innocent, they are entitled to rescind the contract and get back the property they have conveyed. As a remedy originating in the courts of equity, this right to rescind could be lost, in four situations that courts regard as unfair to allow a claim. First, if a claimant takes too long to claim, the lapse of time (or "laches") will create a bar to rescission. Second, if a claimant affirms a contract by expressly showing they still consent to a deal even though they are aware of a misrepresentation, rescission is barred. Third, if a third party's rights have intervened, when that third party is a bona fide purchaser rescission will be barred to the extent that property cannot be recovered from the third party (although a claim in damages can still exist against the misrepresentor). Fourth, and important in practice to prevent unjust enrichment is that counter-restitution must be possible. There is confusion over whether in cases at law, rather than in equity, counter-restitution must be precise (i.e. a thing received must be given back in specie) or whether, as in Erlanger, substantial counter-restitution may be in money.

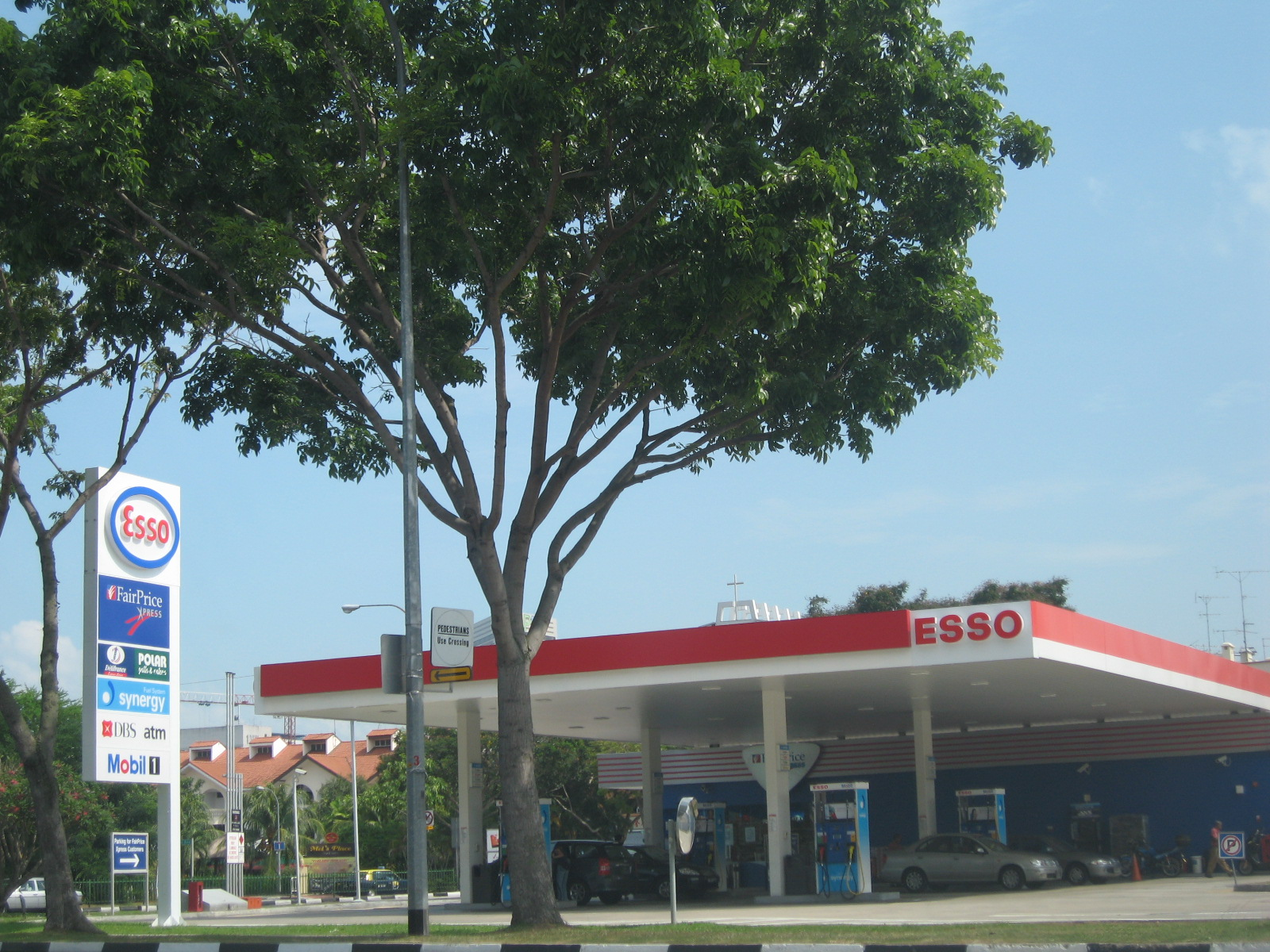
A statement of opinion by an expert, which proves false, will be taken as a factual misrepresentation, as in Esso Petroleum Co Ltd v Mardon.

Depending on how a court construes negotiations, a representation could become a term of the contract, as well as one giving rise to the right to rescind. A misrepresentation that is a term, will entitle the misrepresentee to a simple breach of contract claim, with "expectation damages" for loss of potential profits (subject to remoteness and the duty to mitigate). If the misrepresentation is not a term, then damages may also be available, but only "reliance damages" for losses that have been incurred. Until 1963, the general rule was that only for fraud (i.e. an intentional or reckless misrepresentation) were damages available. For fraud, damages are available for all losses that flow directly from the misrepresentation. However, in its Tenth Report the Law Reform Committee recommended that damages should also be available for negligent misrepresentations. This led to the drafting of the Misrepresentation Act 1967, and just before the Act was passed, the House of Lords also decided in Hedley Byrne & Co Ltd v Heller & Partners Ltd there should be a new claim for negligent misrepresentation at common law. While Hedley Byrne remains an important case for an independent action in tort, MA 1967 section 2(1) was instantly more generous than the common law. It allows damages if the claimant shows a defendant has made a false representation, and then the defendant cannot prove that they had reasonable grounds for making a statement and honestly believed it was true. So while the common law would put the burden of proof on a claimant to show a defendant made a negligent misstatement, MA 1967 s 2(1) shifts the burden of proof to the defendant. The measure of damages is also more generous under the Act than at common law, because just as the Law Reform Report was drafted, the House of Lords was introducing a limit on the quantum of damages for negligence to losses that are reasonably foreseeable. MA 1967 section 2(1), however, was drafted by reference to state the same damages were available as for fraud. So in Royscot Trust Ltd v Rogerson, the Court of Appeal held that even where a representation is negligent, and not fraud, the same quantum of damages is available as for fraud. This is controversial among academics who argue that fraud is more morally culpable than negligent behaviour, and should therefore deserve a more severe limit on compensation, though it is not entirely resolved what the proper circumstances for remoteness ought to be. Under section 2(2) the court has the discretion to substitute the right to rescind a contract for a small misrepresentation with an award of damages. Under section 3, a court has the power to strike down clauses excluding remedies for misrepresentation if they fail the reasonableness test in the Unfair Contract Terms Act 1977.

An exception to the law on misrepresentation – that contracts are voidable at the instance of the misrepresentee, but the right to rescission can be barred among other things by the intervention of third party rights – arises when someone is induced by the fraudulent misrepresentation to enter an agreement through a written document at a distance (and not when a transaction is face to face). In Shogun Finance Ltd v Hudson a crook obtained Mr Patel's credit details and bought a Mitsubishi Shogun on hire purchase contract at a car dealer. Shogun Finance was faxed through Mr Patel's details, and agreed to finance the purchase of the car, letting the crook drive away. Subsequently, Mrs Hudson bought the car from the crook. The crook disappeared. Then Shogun Finance, who had predictably never been paid, found Mrs Hudson and sued to retrieve the car. A bare majority in the House of Lords held that to protect the certainty of commercial dealings through a signed document, the contract between the finance company and the crook was void (the same consequence as if there had never been any offer mirrored by an acceptance). They had only ever intended to contract with Mr Patel. And because nobody can convey property they do not have (nemo dat quod non habet) Mrs Hudson never acquired legitimate title to the car from the crook and had to give back the car. The minority held that this situation should follow ordinary law of misrepresentation, and should mean that the right of the finance company to rescind the contract would be barred by the intervention of Mrs Hudson's rights as a bona fide third party purchaser, just like all of Europe, the United States, and previous decisions of the Court of Appeal suggest. However, because of the majority's decision this special category of "mistake about identity" cases remains a general exception to the English law on misrepresentation.

=== Duress, undue influence and conscience ===
While the law on disclosure and misrepresentation aims to make contracting parties informed (or not disinformed), the law also says agreements may be avoided when, in a very general sense, a person's free will was impaired. Complete exercise of "free will" is rare for most people, because they make choices within a constrained range of alternatives. The law still holds people to nearly all contracts (if consumer, employment, tenancy, etc. legislation is not activated) except where someone was under duress, unduly influenced or exploited while in a vulnerable position. Like misrepresentation, the victim may avoid the contract, and the parties restore their property to reverse unjust enrichment, subject to the victim's claim for damages, so long as none of the four equitable bars to rescission lie (i.e. no excessive lapse of time, affirmation of the contract, intervention of an innocent third party's rights and counter-restitution is possible). The most straight forward claim, for duress, involves illegitimate threats. The common law long allowed a claim if duress was of a physical nature. So long as a threat is just one of the reasons a person enters an agreement, even if not the main reason, the agreement may be avoided. Only late in the 20th century was escape allowed if the threat involved illegitimate economic harm. A threat is always "illegitimate" if it is to do an unlawful act, such as breaking a contract knowing non-payment may push someone out of business. However, threatening to do a lawful act will usually not be illegitimate. In Pao on v Lau Yiu Long the Pao family threatened to not complete a share swap deal, aimed at selling their company's building, unless the Lau family agreed to change a part of the proposed agreement to guarantee the Paos would receive rises in the swapped shares' prices on repurchase. The Laus signed the guarantee agreement after this threat, and then claimed it was not binding. But the Privy Council advised their signature was only a result of "commercial pressure", not economic duress. The Laus' considered the situation before signing, and did not behave like someone under duress, so there was no coercion amounting to a vitiation of consent. However, contrasting to cases involving business parties, the threat to do a lawful act will probably be duress if used against a vulnerable person. An obvious case involving "lawful act duress" is blackmail. The blackmailer has to justify, not doing the lawful act they threaten, but against a person highly vulnerable to them, the demand of money.

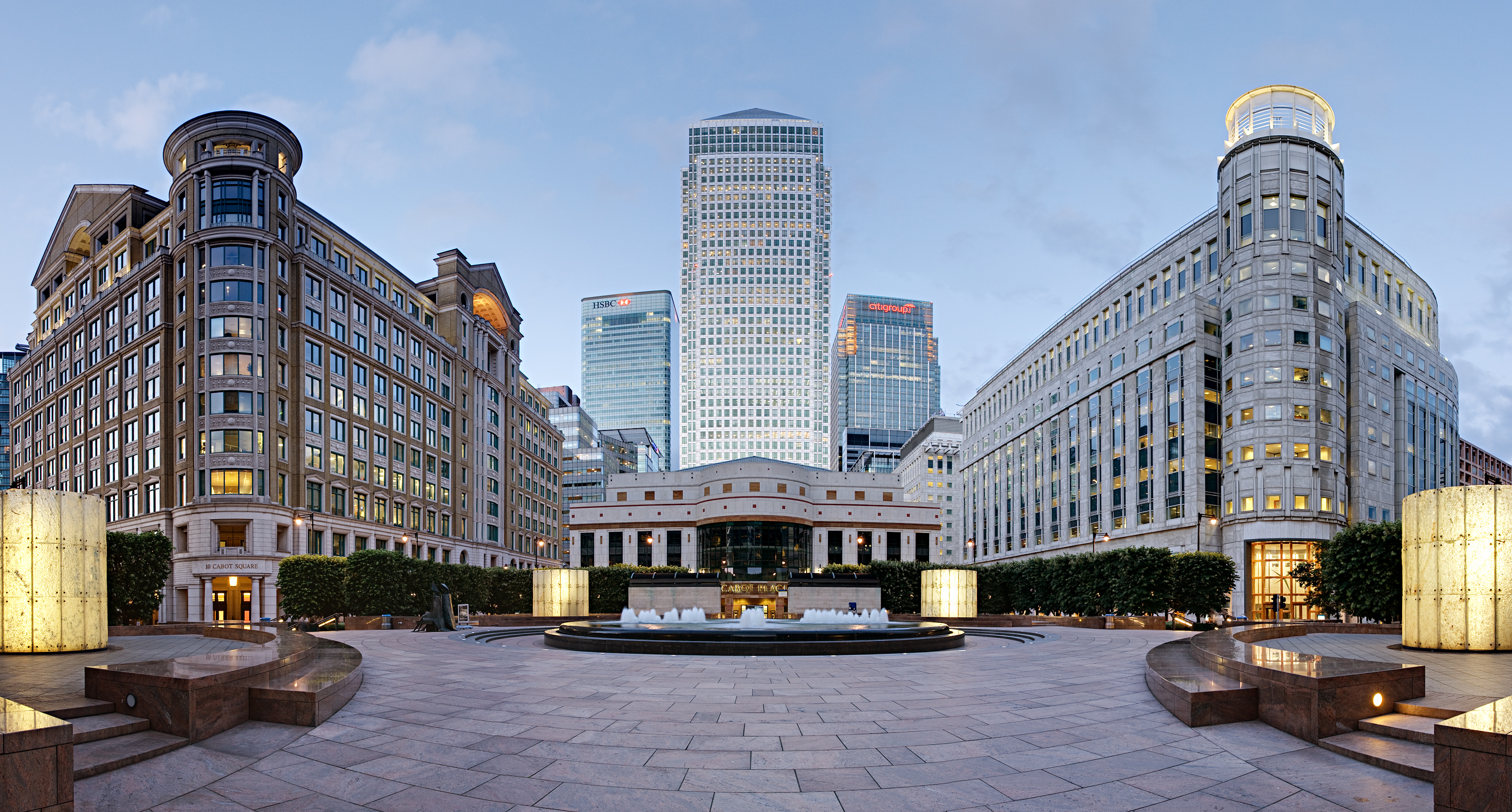
Third parties, particularly banks, will not see their security cancelled over undue influence claims if they ensure people seeking mortgages have independent advice.

Parallel to the slow development of common law duress, the courts of equity allowed escape from a contract if any form of undue influence was used against a contracting party. "Actual undue influence" is now essentially the same thing as duress in its wider form. In these "class 1" cases, a claimant proves they were actually put under undue influence. Most relevant are the cases on "presumed undue influence", of which there are two sub-classes. "Class 2A" cases involve someone being in a pre-defined relation of trust and confidence with another, before which they enter a very disadvantageous transaction. In Allcard v Skinner, Miss Allcard joined a Christian sect, the "Protestant Sisters of the Poor", run by her spiritual adviser, Miss Skinner. After taking vows of poverty and obedience she gave the sect almost all her property. Lindley LJ held that if she had not been barred from the claim by letting 6 years lapse, it could be presumed that Miss Allcard was unduly influenced and she would have been able to rescind the transfer. Other class 2A relationships include doctor and patient, parent and child, solicitor and client, or any fiduciary relation (but not wife and husband). Where the relation does not fall into one of these, it stands with "class 2B" cases. Here, a claimant may first prove that there was in fact a strong relation of trust and confidence. If that is done, and there is a disadvantageous transaction, it will be presumed to result from undue influence. It will then be up to the recipient of the property to rebut the presumption. This takes on greatest significance in cases involving banks typically lending money to a husband for his business, and securing a mortgage over the husband and wife's jointly owned home. Significant problems arose, particularly after the early 1990s housing, stock market and currency crashes, where the husband's business failed, the bank attempted to repossess the house, and the wife claimed she never understood the implications of the mortgage or was pressured into it. Even though a bank may have played no illegitimate role, if it had "constructive notice" of undue influence (i.e. if it was aware that something was potentially wrong) the bank would lose its security and could not repossess the house. In Royal Bank of Scotland plc v Etridge the House of Lords decided that in such situations a bank should ensure that the spouse has been independently advised by a solicitor, who in turn confirms in writing there is no question of undue influence, before giving out a loan.

As opposed to duress and actual undue influence, where illegitimate pressure is applied, or presumed undue influence which depends on a relationship of trust and confidence being abused, further cases allow a vulnerable person to avoid an agreement merely on the basis that they were vulnerable and exploited. In The Medina the Court of Appeal found that a group of pilgrims shipwrecked on a rock in the Red Sea did not need to pay £4000 they promised to a rescue ship, because the "rescuers" had exploited the pilgrims vulnerable position. To prevent unjust enrichment, the Court substituted an award of £1800. Similarly, in Cresswell v Potter, Ms Cresswell conveyed her ex-husband her share of their joint property in return for release from mortgage repayments, later making him £1400 profit. Because Potter took advantage of Ms Creswell's ignorance of property transactions, Megarry J held the agreement was voidable. One potential exception to this pattern, and now very heavily restricted, is the defence of "non est factum", which originally applied in favour of illiterate people in the 19th century allowed a person to have a signed contract declared void if it is radically different from what was envisaged. In Lloyds Bank Ltd v Bundy, Lord Denning MR proposed it was time that all cases be placed into one unified doctrine of "inequality of bargaining power". This would have allowed escape from an agreement if without independent advice one person's ability to bargain for better terms had been heavily impaired, and would have essentially given courts broader scope to change contracts to the advantage of weaker parties. The idea of a general unified doctrine was disapproved by some members of the House of Lords from 1979. However, in 2020 the Supreme Court of Canada approved Bundy and acknowledged that a general doctrine of unconscionability, based upon unequal bargaining power, was part of Canadian law in Uber Technologies Inc v Heller. In the UK, specific legislation such as the Consumer Credit Act 1974, the Landlord and Tenant Act 1985, or the Employment Rights Act 1996 creates targeted rights for contracting parties who lack bargaining power, in the same way as specific legislation creates multiple duties of disclosure and good faith. While the UK courts have not yet acknowledged a unified theory of bargaining power, a unified doctrine of freedom of contract was dismantled long ago where the parties are not making commercial deals in the course of business.

=== Incapacity ===
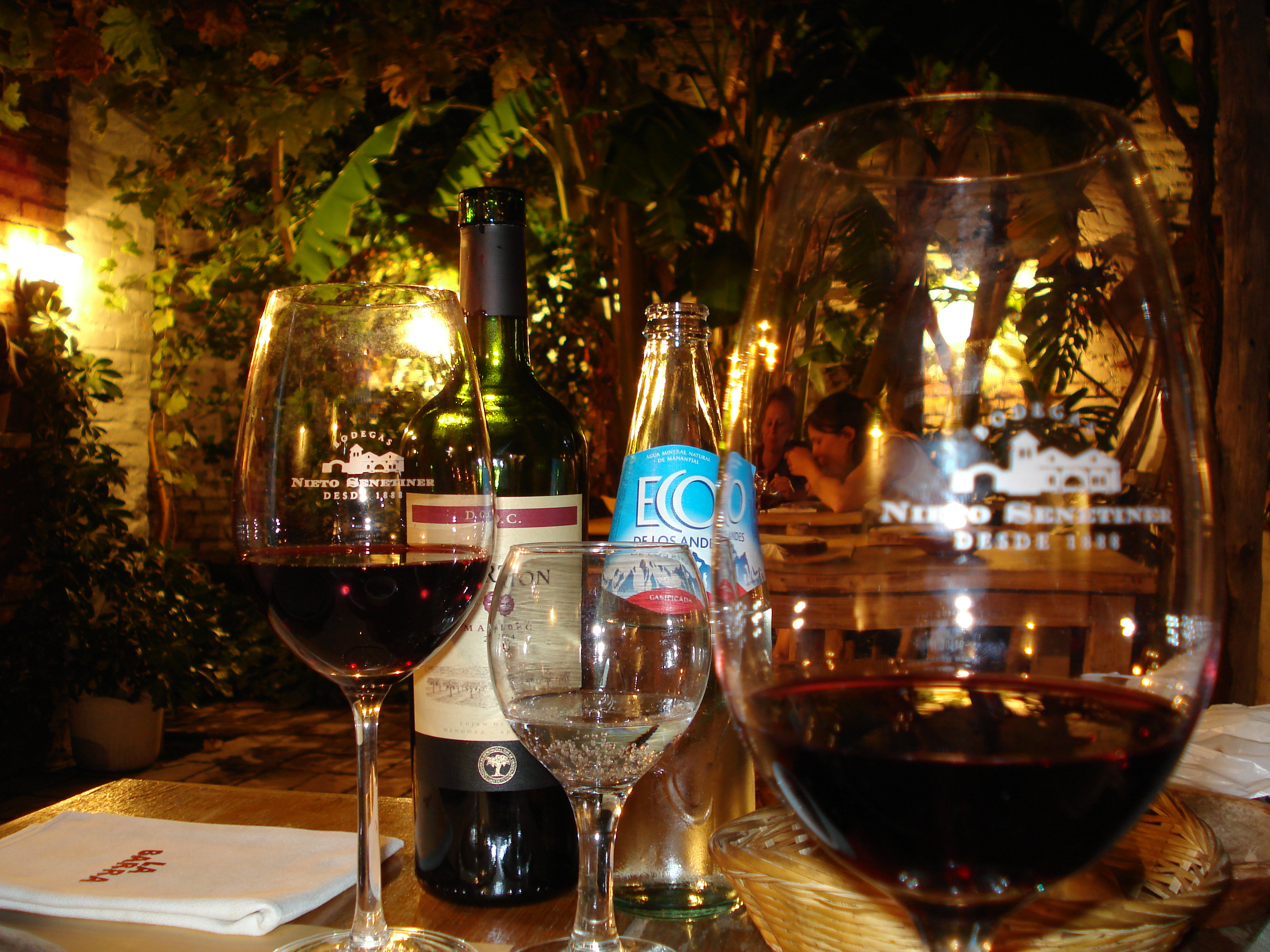
Heavily intoxicated people will be bound to contracts for "necessaries", which can ironically include more alcohol.

In three main situations, English law allows people who lack legal capacity to contract to escape from enforcement of agreements and recover property that was conveyed, to reverse unjust enrichment. First, a person may be too young to be bound by large or onerous contracts. Minors, under 18 years, can bind themselves to contracts for "necessaries" to pay a reasonable price, but only unusual contracts, such as for eleven luxury waistcoats will not be deemed "necessaries". While the adult contracting party is bound, the minor has the option to rescind the contract, so long as one of the four equitable bars (lapse of time, affirmation, third party rights, counter-restitution possible) is not present. Second, people who are mentally incapacitated, for instance because they are sectioned under the Mental Health Act 1983 or they are completely intoxicated, are in principle bound to agreements when the other person could not or did not know they lacked mental capacity. But if the other person did know or should have known, then the mentally incapacitated individual may no longer have agreements for non-necessaries enforced upon them. Third, companies can generally bind themselves to any agreement, even though many (particularly older) companies have a limited range of objects that their members (in most companies this means shareholders) have consented that the business is for. Under the Companies Act 2006 sections 39 and 40, if a third party contracting with the company in bad faith takes advantage of a director or officer to procure an agreement, that contract will be wholly void. This is a high threshold, and in practice no longer relevant, particularly since 2006 companies may elect to have unrestricted objects. It is more likely that a contract ceases to be enforceable because, as a matter of the law of agency the third party should have reasonably known that the person contracting lacked authority to enter an agreement. In this situation a contract is voidable at the instance of the company, and could only be enforced against the (probably less solvent) employee.

In a fourth case, the consequences of incapacity are more drastic. Although the Crown Proceedings Act 1947 made it possible for the government or emanations of the state to be sued on contracts in the same way as a normal individual, where statute confers power on a public body to do certain acts, actions by representatives beyond that power will be ultra vires and void. The result is the same as it was for companies before reform in 1989, so that whole chains of agreements could be declared as non-existent.

=== Illegality ===
A final group of reasons that a contract may be cancelled or vitiated is where it involves illegal subject matter. If people attempt to contract for something that is illegal, the general policy of the courts is not to allow its enforcement. For example, in Everet v Williams, a highway robber attempted to sue another highwayman for not sharing profits from their theft as they had apparently agreed. The Court of Exchequer held the contract was void and unenforceable, and both were later arrested and hanged. Thus nobody can bring an action out of an illegal act, or ex turpi causa non oritur actio. However, a person may claim if they are not responsible for the illegal conduct, and a defendant would otherwise profit from their wrong. In Holman v Johnson a tea seller in Dunkirk sued an English tea smuggler for non-payment for the tea. The tea smuggler argued he could not be sued because the contract was mixed with (his own) illegal conduct. The Dunkirk seller knew the tea would be illegally smuggled into England. However, Lord Mansfield held that he could get the money he was promised, noting that the "objection, that a contract is immoral or illegal as between plaintiff and defendant, sounds at all times very ill in the mouth of the defendant". The Supreme Court has stated the illegality doctrine must be applied according to the policy behind it. In Hounga v Allen a young woman was trafficked into the UK contrary to the Immigration Act 1971 and worked for an employer in conditions that amounted to forced labour. The Supreme Court held she could bring a claim for race discrimination against her employer because this was based on a statutory right, and a majority also suggested that she could bring a claim for unpaid wages and unfair dismissal even though these claims arose through her contract. Although Miss Hounga's employment contract violated the Immigration Act 1971, international law against trafficking protected the most vulnerable party (the employee), and aimed to punish the responsible party (the employer). The public policy, in the illegality defence, was "to preserve the integrity of the legal system", and that concern did not affect Ms Hounga's claim. Similarly, in Patel v Mirza the Supreme Court held that Mr Patel could recover £620,000 from Mr Mirza, even though Patel knew Mirza was going to use the money to buy Royal Bank of Scotland shares based on insider information (which proved wrong). This was that the government would make an announcement about RBS that would affect its share price. This deal amounted to an illegal conspiracy for insider dealing. According to Lord Toulson, although Patel acted illegally, two key principles were that "a person [like Mirza] should not be allowed to profit from his own wrongdoing" and "the law should be coherent and not self-defeating, condoning illegality by giving with the left-hand what it takes with the right hand." It followed that Patel could recover the money in an action in unjust enrichment even though the contract was not enforceable by Patel.

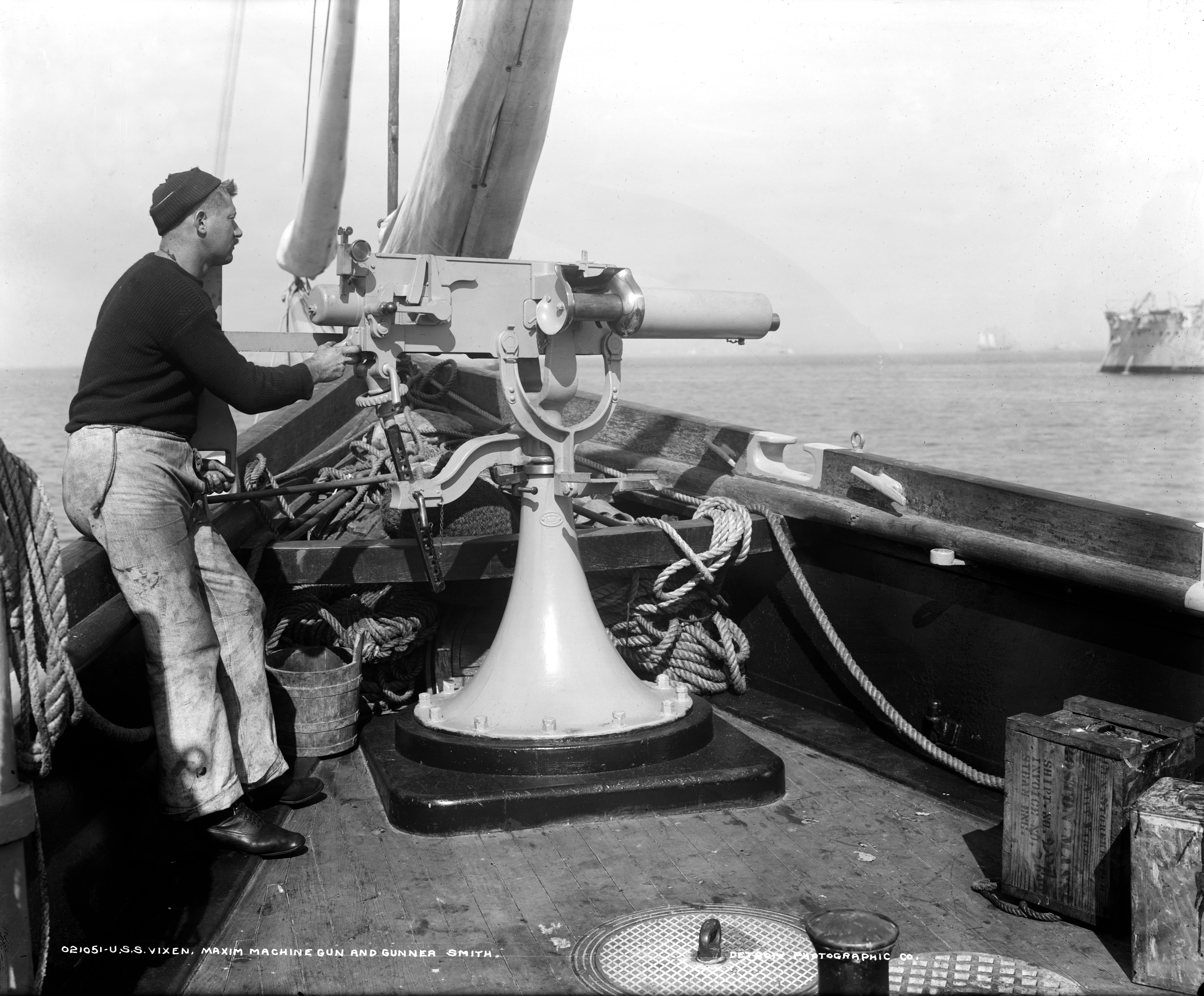
While all monopolies are illegal and void, contracts that unreasonably restrain trade are illegal. Nordenfelt v Maxim, Nordenfelt Gun Co held that a clause to "not compete... in any way" was void.

The contracts that count as illegal are wide-ranging. Contracts could be illegal under statute, such as the insider dealing ban in Patel v Mirza, the ban on hiding assets from creditors if going bankrupt, the ban on agreements to exclude jurisdiction of a court, or the ban on contracts for "gaming or wagering". Courts may also declare contracts illegal if they are against "public policy". The courts have recognised multiple categories before, and may develop new ones. These have included agreements to overthrow a friendly government, to publish libel, to obstruct bankruptcy proceedings, to procure a knighthood, to violate exchange control regulations, or to defraud the tax authorities. One of the most important categories in economic life is the restraint of trade doctrine, the common law precursor to modern competition law. A contract is an unlawful "restraint of trade" if it limits someone's freedom of action "unreasonably", a standard that has no fixed meaning and has changed over time. By common law and statute, all monopolies are "utterly void", and unfairly restrictive practices by parties with economic power are prohibited. In Nordenfelt v Maxim, Nordenfelt Gun Co the House of Lords held that a clause was an unreasonable restraint where it stated that a Swedish arms inventor, who sold his business to an American company, "would not compete with Maxim in any way". However, another clause that "for the next 25 years, [he] would not make guns or ammunition anywhere in the world" was valid. If the restraint is "reasonable... in reference to the interests of the parties concerned and reasonable in reference to the interests of the public" it would be valid. The scope of the doctrine differs based on the parties' bargaining power. As Lord McNaughton said, there "is obviously more freedom of contract between buyer and seller, than between... an employer and a person seeking employment." This means restraints upon employees' freedom, and clauses requiring exclusive dealing, are more likely to be struck down as void. Among businesses, it is more likely that a large business' contractual restraints on small businesses will be held to unreasonable. In Esso Petroleum Co Ltd v Harper's Garage (Stourport) Ltd the House of Lords held that an agreement for Harper's Garage to buy all its petrol from Esso for 5 years was reasonable, but an agreement that lasted 21 years was not. Even more, an agreement between a major music publisher and a novice songwriter to assign all copyright over new music to the publisher for 5 years was unreasonable, because the songwriter had little or no real bargaining power. As the American judge, Louis Brandeis has stated, "the essence of restraint is power; and power may arise merely out of position. Wherever a dominant position has been attained, restraint necessarily arises." In addition there are powerful remedies against monopolies and business cartels in the Competition Act 1998 for abuse of dominant positions, and practices that disrupt competition.

== Theory ==
As well as debates over particular rules, theories of contract law generally concern either what a contract "is", where it sits within the rest of the law, and what contract law should do. First, many alternative explanations have been given for the "basis of contract", or what it is that makes us want to enforce a contract. The idea of contract being founded on "promises" is very common, or all promises in the course of business, but it is clear that there are many exceptions where contracts require form, equivalence, or must fit with public policy. A related notion is that a contract reflects the declaration of one's will, however it is often unclear what people have really wanted or intended. Often intentions conflict, and courts decide based on objective facts. Other theories emphasise that a contract is based in injurious reliance, getting a quid pro quo, or a fair distribution of risks. The law and moral philosophy professor, Adam Smith, said that the "foundation of contract is the reasonable expectation, which the person who promises raises in the person to whom he binds himself; of which the satisfaction may be exerted by force." While the upholding of "reasonable expectations" most closely reflects modern English contract law and has wide judicial support, it is possible that "the roots of the law of contract are many rather than one."

Second, contracts have since Roman law often been seen as part of the law of "obligations" and "private law", although the common law and modern practice departs from this. On the classical approach, a contract is a consent-based "obligation", or an in personam right exercisable against another person. Consent based obligations contrast to "wrongs" (such as torts), "unjust enrichments" and miscellaneous others. Obligations are said to contrast to the law of "property" (rights in rem, or relations between persons and things) and the law of "persons" (on capacity, families, companies or polities). Obligations, property and persons make up "private law", and this is divided on the Roman law view from "public law", namely constitutional, administrative and criminal law. However, this strict classification, of private and public, has often been rejected by a more pragmatic view in English common law and equity. This saw the division between "public and private" as largely fictitious, and saw the role of the common law as controlling unjustified use of power, whether private or public, contractual or state, and the role of equity as cutting through strict rules to ensure people acted in good conscience. In the United States, the US Supreme Court developed a constitutional doctrine of "freedom of contract", based upon the idea that the state should never interfere in "private" rights, and could only regulate "public" affairs, and used this to justify the continuation of racial segregation, discrimination, child labour, working weeks over 60 hours, and no unions or fair pay. This view of the law was finally rejected during the New Deal era of the 1930s, and in most countries a strict separation between "private and public" law, or the idea of non-interference in contracts has disappeared, as it was seen that law creates all contractual rules and there is no pre-interference state: the only question is whether the rules are just. A related issue is that contracts have been increasingly viewed as less distinguishable from "property" rights, or other obligations than Roman categories suggest. Since the late 19th century it was held that contract and "property" alike could bind third parties, once the tort of interference with contract was recognised, and the law recognised that contractual claims could take priority over proprietary interests of secured creditors in insolvency. In The Death of Contract Grant Gilmore went so far as to argue that the increasingly fixed content of most contracts and the courts' control of power meant that contracts were "being reabsorbed into the mainstream of 'tort'", namely set by law, according to public standards of justice. This said, it remains clear that contracts create rights above the minimum standards set in statute and the general law.

Third, what contract law should do is probably the most contested question, and often this shapes what scholars say a contract "is", or where contract law "fits". The theory of "freedom of contract", which said that the state or courts should not interfere with people's bargains, reached its high point in the late 19th century. It was called a "paramount public policy" by the Court of Appeal, and at its most extreme became a constitutional principle to justify striking down social and economic rights in the US Supreme Court (over powerful dissent). In the most influential economic theories of a similar time, John Stuart Mill argued that while laissez faire should be the general rule, there were major exceptions covering consumers, any long-term contract, the governance of large organisations, employment relations, and for insuring people's welfare. The concept of inequality of bargaining power became the dominant mode of understanding why (unlike commercial relations) some contracts require rights (that cannot be contracted away) to be positively upheld by law. Unequal bargaining power is now generally seen to come from differences "in wealth, knowledge, or experience", but may also go much further to psychological differences, and all other circumstances. There are also extensive theories of contracting in economics, particularly problems such as adverse selection, moral hazard, information asymmetry, the principal–agent problem and behavioural economics. Increasingly, empirical research is used to determine how people behave in real settings, and how the law should respond to ensure contractual relations are just.

== See also ==
- EU law
- English trust law
- English land law
- UK constitutional law
- UK company law
- UK labour law
- UK commercial law
- Unidroit Principles of International Commercial Contracts of 2004 (text and commentary)
- Principles of European Contract Law of 2003
- Uniform Commercial Code of 1952
- Restatement (Second) of Contracts of 1979
- South African contract law
- US contract law
- German contract law
- French contract law
- Canadian contract law
- Australian contract law
