= Contractual Remedies Act 1979 =

Act of Parliament in New Zealand

New Zealand Parliament
- Enacted: 1979
- Repealed: 1 September 2017

Repealed by
- Contract and Commercial Law Act 2017
- Status: Repealed

The Contractual Remedies Act 1979 was a statute of the New Zealand Parliament, one of a series of Acts of Parliament adopted from 1969 onwards, the "Contract Statutes", which made changes to the contractual aspects of the law of New Zealand. It provided remedies in respect of misrepresentation, repudiation or breach of contract in New Zealand.

It was repealed by the Contract and Commercial Law Act 2017.

== Cases ==
- Brown v Langwoods Photo Stores Ltd
- Burch v Willoughby Consultants Ltd
- Cullinane v McGuigan
- Gallagher v Young
- Garratt v Ikeda
- Hansen v Boocock
- Jackson v McClintock
- M E Torbett Ltd v Keirlor Motels Ltd
- Mayall v Ward
- New Zealand Tenancy Bonds Ltd v Mooney
- Newmans Tours Ltd v Ranier Investments Ltd
- Pendergrast v Chapman
- Simanke v Liu
- Thompson v Vincent
- Wakelin v R H & E A Jackson Ltd
- Worsdale v Polglase
- Young v Hunt

== Relevant reading ==
- Francis Dawson and David W McLauchlan. The Contractual Remedies Act 1979. Sweet & Maxwell. Auckland, New Zealand. 1981. Catalogue. Reviewed at 41 Cambridge Law Journal 189 ; and 3 Oxford Journal of Legal Studies 113
- Butterworths Annotations of New Zealand Statutes
- Butterworths Property Law Statutes. First Edition. 1996. Third Edition. 2003. Fourth Edition. 2005.
- Brookers Property Law Legislation, 2016. Catalogue
- J F Burrows, "The Contractual Remedies Act 1979 - Six Years On" (1986) 6 Otago Law Review 220
- J F Burrows, "The Contractual Remedies Act 1979" (1980) 1 Canterbury Law Review 82 (No 1)
- C I Paterson, "The Contractual Remedies Act 1979" in "Contract" [1980] New Zealand Law Journal 307 (5 August 1980) ["Introductory remarks", sometimes cited as "The Contractual Remedies Act 1979 - Introductory Remarks"] Google
- B A K Rider, "Contractual Remedies - Act Reforms Misrepresentation" (1980) 1 Company Lawyer 53
- David W McLauchlan, "Contract law reform in New Zealand: The Contractual Remedies Act 1979" (1981) 1 Oxford Journal of Legal Studies 284 JSTOR Oxford
- R J Sutton, "Contractual Remedies Act 1979" [1980] New Zealand Recent Law 19
- Dukeson, "Contractual Remedies Act 1979, s 7(5) Contracts - Election" [1986] New Zealand Law Journal 182
- Campbell T Walker, "Section 9 of the Contractual Remedies Act 1979: Opening Pandora's Box" (1994) 7 Auckland University Law Review 527 (No 3)
- David W McLachlan, "Merger and Acknowledgement Clauses under the Contractual Remedies Act 1979" (1988) 18 Victoria University of Wellington Law Review 311
- Marcus Roberts, "Misdescription Clauses, Misrepresentations and the Contractual Remedies Act 1979" (2015) 26 New Zealand Law Review 213 (No 2, July 2015) Catalogue SSRN
- Brian Coote, "Repudiation, affirmation, and substantial breach under the Contractual Remedies Act 1979" (2002) 8 New Zealand Business Law Quarterly 8 (No 1, February 2002) Catalogue *Francis Dawson, "Readiness and willingness under the Contractual Remedies Act" (2017) 23 New Zealand Business Law Quarterly 61 (No 1, June 2017) Catalogue
- Brian Coote, "Competing cancellations and the Contractual Remedies Act 1979" (2003) 9 New Zealand Business Law Quarterly 120 (No 2, May 2003) Catalogue
- Brian Coote, "Debts unpaid at Cancellation under the Contractual Remedies Act 1979" (1991) 14 New Zealand Universities Law Review 195
- Francis Dawson and David W McLaughlan, "Recovery of Deposits by Defaulting Purchasers under the Contractual Remedies Act 1979" [1981] 14 New Zealand Law Journal 486
- Brian Coote, "Unpaid deposits and the Contractual Remedies Act 1979" (2002) 8 New Zealand Business Law Quarterly 142 (No 2, May 2002) Catalogue
- Andrew Beck, "Money had and received and the Contractual Remedies Act 1979" [1993] New Zealand Law Journal 429 Google
- Brian Coote, "Chinese whispers and the Contractual Remedies Act 1979" (2001) 7 New Zealand Business Law Quarterly 281 (No 4, November 2001) Catalogue
- Emma Biggs, "Should an Innocent Half-Truth be an Actionable Misrepresentation under the Contractual Remedies Act 1979?" (2011) 2 New Zealand Law Students Journal 624
