= Cremdean Properties Ltd v Nash =

- Court: Court of Appeal
- Citation: (1977) 244 Estates Gazette 547

Keywords
- Misrepresentation, exclusion clause

Cremdean Properties Ltd v Nash (1977) 244 EG 547 is an English contract law case, concerning misrepresentation and exclusion of liability under section 3 of the Misrepresentation Act 1967.

== Facts ==
Cremdean Properties Ltd contracted to buy some Bristol property from Nash. They wanted to develop it. They relied on representations by Nash’s agents that there was planning permission for 17,900 square feet (1,660 m^{2}) of offices. The true figure was much lower. Cremdean sought rescission or damages for misrepresentation. Nash sought to rely on a footnote clause in the invitation to tender document that said although statements (like the planning permission) ‘are believe to be correct their accuracy is not guaranteed’ errors would not annul the sale and pre-contract statements did not form part of the offer. Also, any purchaser should satisfy himself. Cremdean Properties Ltd argued that the exclusion fell within s3 of the Misrepresentation Act 1967 and was unreasonable.

== Judgment ==
Bridge LJ held that the footnote was an exclusion clause within s 3. He noted that Nash’s argument that the footnote was effective to nullify representations in the document altogether (not just exclusions) resulted in no representation having ever been made. He said this argument altogether, and that such a result would be ‘remarkable’. He distinguished that the Overbrooke Estates Ltd v Glencombe Properties Ltd situation had no effect here, because the agents that published the documents always had Nash’s authority.

It is one thing to say that section 3 does not inhibit a principal from publicly giving notice limiting the ostensible authority of his agents; it is quite another thing to say that a principal can circumvent the plainly intended effect of s 3…

He added that it would be enough to go by ordinary interpretation principles, that the footnote was an exclusion. But even if an ingenious draftsman had said that ‘no representation is being made by our representations’ or something, s 3 could still not be circumvented.

Scarman LJ concurred. He said that the logic of Nash's argument was appealing that,

a statement is not a representation unless it is also a statement that what is stated is true. If in context a statement contains no assertion, express or implied, that its content is accurate, there is no representation. Ergo, there can be no misrepresentation; ergo the Misrepresentation Act 1967 cannot apply to it. Humpty Dumpty would have fallen for this argument. If we were to fall for it, the Misrepresentation Act would be dashed to pieces which not all the King’s lawyers could put together again.

Buckley LJ concurred.

== See also ==
- Misrepresentation in English law
- Overbrooke Estates Ltd v Glencombe Properties Ltd
