= Royscot Trust Ltd v Rogerson =

English contract law

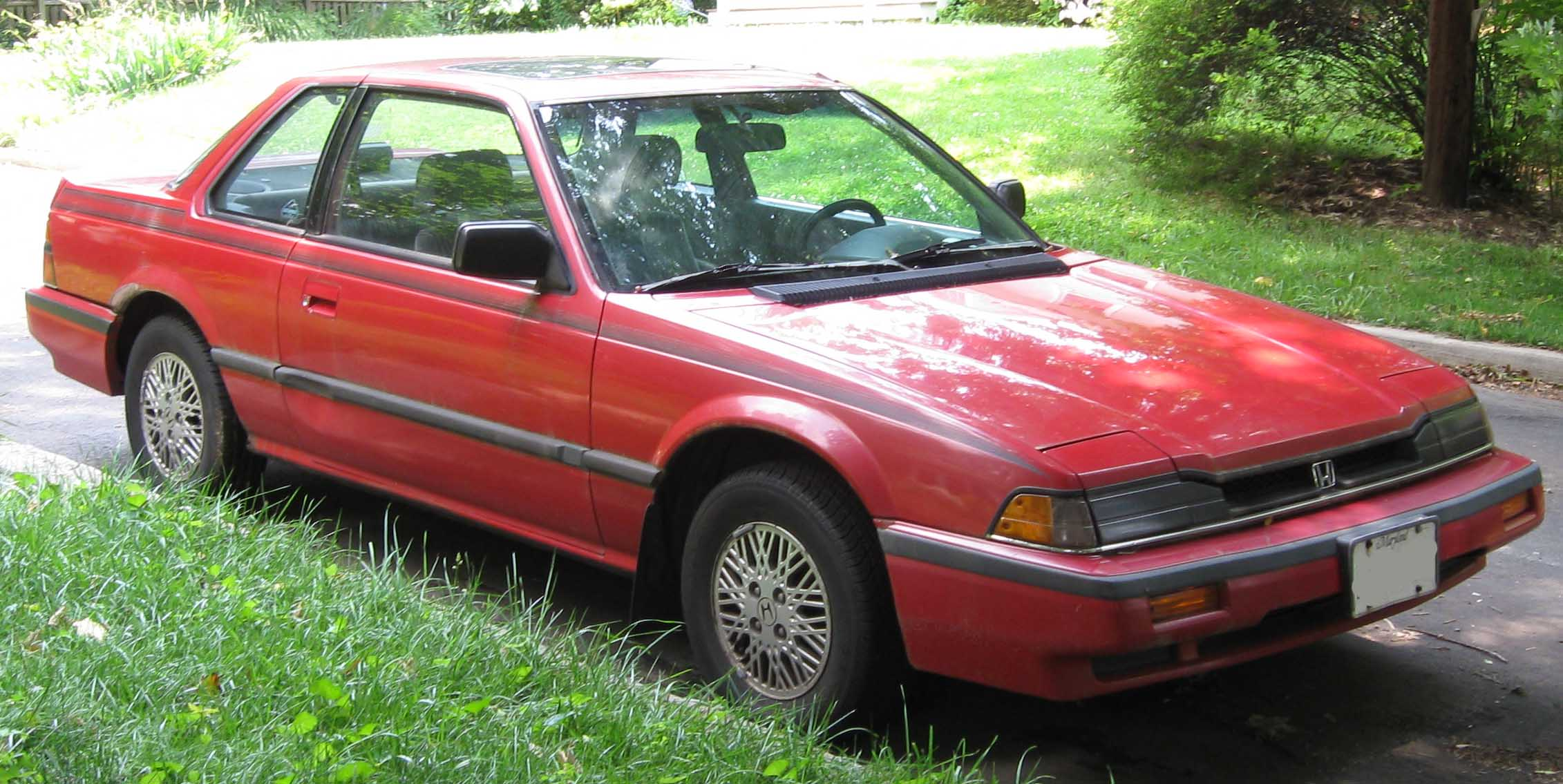
- Court: Court of Appeal
- Decided: 21 March 1991
- Citations: [1991] EWCA Civ 12, [1991] 2 QB 297; [1991] 3 WLR 57; [1992] RTR 99

Court membership
- Judges sitting: Balcombe and Ralph Gibson LJJ

Royscot Trust Ltd v Rogerson [1991] EWCA Civ 12 is an English contract law case concerned with misrepresentation. It examines the Misrepresentation Act 1967 and addresses the extent of damages available under s 2(1) for negligent misrepresentation.

The Court of Appeal controversially decided that under the Act, the appropriate measure of damages was the same as that for common law fraud, or damages for all losses flowing from a misrepresentation, even if unforeseeable. The reasoning of the decision has been much criticised by academic lawyers such as Guenter Treitel and Richard Hooley, partly for its overly literal interpretation of the statute, and for its dubious finding of fact that a deliberately false document was made negligently, rather than fraudulently.

== Facts ==
Rogerson acquired a used Honda Prelude on hire purchase terms from a car dealer, Maidenhead Honda Centre Ltd. The car was priced at £7,600, Rogerson paying a £1,200 deposit, some 15.8% of the total. The balance came from a finance company, Royscot Trust Ltd. On Rogerson's behalf, the dealer filled in the application forms, falsely misrepresenting that the total cost was £8,000 and the deposit was £1,600 (20% of the total). Royscot approved the loan; but, had accurate figures been stated, they would have refused finance since its policy was not to lend money if the deposit was less than 20%.

Rogerson began paying instalments, but in due course had cashflow difficulties. In August 1987 he dishonestly sold the car, knowing the car was not yet his to sell. (Note: He sold the car to a private purchaser for £7,200: the purchaser acquiring good title to the car under the provisions of the Hire-Purchase Act 1964.) A year later, he informed the finance company of the sale, and stopped paying instalments in September 1988, leaving the balance unpaid.

Royscot sued the car dealer in damages, alleging that they had relied upon the dealer's misrepresentation, which induced them into the finance plan. Fraud was not mentioned, but Royscot claimed that had the dealer given the correct figures, they would have refused finance, and that the £3,625.24 loss was the dealer's fault. The dealer countered that the actual cause of Royscot's loss was Rogerson's unlawful sale of the car, since, if he had not sold it, Royscot would be entitled to its repossession. The dealer alleged Rogerson's unlawful sale broke the chain of causation between any misrepresentation and Royscot's loss.

== Judgment ==
Balcombe LJ and Ralph Gibson LJ held:

- That for negligent misrepresentation under s.2(1), the correct measure of damages was tortious and the same as that for the tort of deceit.
- The car dealer was liable for all the consequences of his misrepresentation, and therefore had to pay the losses incurred by Royscot Trust Ltd.
- Rogerson's wrongful sale of the car was foreseeable and not a break in the chain of causation.

The following passage of Balcombe LJ's judgment is key:

The first main issue before us was: accepting that the tortious measure is the right measure, is it the measure where the tort is that of fraudulent misrepresentation, or is it the measure where the tort is negligence at common law? The difference is that in cases of fraud a plaintiff is entitled to any loss which flowed from the defendant's fraud, even if the loss could not have been foreseen: see Doyle v Olby (Ironmongers) Ltd [1969] 2 Q.B. 158 . In my judgment the wording of the subsection is clear: the person making the innocent misrepresentation shall be "so liable," i.e., liable to damages as if the representation had been made fraudulently. This was the conclusion to which Walton J. came in F. & B. Entertainments Ltd. v. Leisure Enterprises Ltd. (1976) 240 E.G. 455, 461. See also the decision of Sir Douglas Frank Q.C., sitting as a High Court judge, in McNally v. Welltrade International Ltd. [1978] I.R.L.R. 497 . In each of these cases the judge held that the basis for the assessment of damages under section 2(1) of the Act of 1967 is that established in Doyle v Olby (Ironmongers) Ltd This is also the effect of the judgment of Eveleigh L.J. in Chesneau v. Interhome Ltd. already cited: "By 'so liable' I take it to mean liable as he would be if the misrepresentation had been made fraudulently."

This was also the original view of the academic writers. In an article, "The Misrepresentation Act 1967" (1967) 30 Modern Law Review 369 by P. S. Atiyah and G. H. Treitel, the authors say, at pp. 373-374:

"The measure of damages in the statutory action will apparently be that in an action of deceit... But more probably the damages recoverable in the new action are the same as those recoverable in an action of deceit..."

Treitel has since changed his view. In his The Law of Contract, he says:

"Where the action is brought under section 2(1) of the Misrepresentation Act, one possible view is that the deceit rule will be applied by virtue of the fiction of fraud. But the preferable view is that the severity of the deceit rule can only be justified in cases of actual fraud and that remoteness under section 2(1) should depend, as in actions based on negligence, on the test of foreseeability."

The only authority cited in support of the "preferable" view is Shepheard v. Broome [1904] A.C. 342, a case under section 38 of the Companies Act 1867, which provided that in certain circumstances a company director, although not in fact fraudulent, should be "deemed to be fraudulent." As Lord Lindley said, at p. 346: "To be compelled by Act of Parliament to treat an honest man as if he were fraudulent is at all times painful", but he went on to say:

"but the repugnance which is naturally felt against being compelled to do so will not justify your Lordships in refusing to hold the appellant responsible for acts for which an Act of Parliament clearly declares he is to be held liable."

The House of Lords so held.

It seems to me that that case, far from supporting Treitel's view, is authority for the proposition that we must follow the literal wording of section 2(1), even though that has the effect of treating, so far as the measure of damages is concerned, an innocent person as if he were fraudulent. Chitty on Contracts, 26th ed. (1989), vol. 1, p. 293, para. 439, says:

"it is doubtful whether the rule that the plaintiff may recover even unforeseeable losses suffered as the result of fraud would be applied; it is an exceptional rule which is probably justified only in cases of actual fraud."

No authority is cited in support of that proposition save a reference to the passage in Treitel's book cited above.

Michael Furmston in Cheshire, Fifoot and Furmston's Law of Contract, 11th ed. (1986), p. 286, says:

"It has been suggested" - and the reference is to the passage in Atiyah and Treitel's article cited above - "that damages under section 2(1) should be calculated on the same principles as govern the tort of deceit. This suggestion is based on a theory that section 2(1) is based on a 'fiction of fraud.' We have already suggested that this theory is misconceived. On the other hand the action created by section 2(1) does look much more like an action in tort than one in contract and it is suggested that the rules for negligence are the natural ones to apply."

The suggestion that the "fiction of fraud" theory is misconceived occurs at p. 271, in a passage which includes:

"Though it would be quixotic to defend the drafting of the section, it is suggested that there is no such 'fiction of fraud' since the section does not say that a negligent misrepresentor shall be treated for all purposes as if he were fraudulent. No doubt the wording seeks to incorporate by reference some of the rules relating to fraud but, for instance, nothing in the wording of the subsection requires the measure of damages for deceit to be applied to the statutory action."

With all respect to the various learned authors whose works I have cited above, it seems to me that to suggest that a different measure of damage applies to an action for innocent misrepresentation under the section than that which applies to an action for fraudulent misrepresentation (deceit) at common law is to ignore the plain words of the subsection and is inconsistent with the cases to which I have referred. In my judgment, therefore, the finance company is entitled to recover from the dealer all the losses which it suffered as a result of its entering into the agreements with the dealer and the customer, even if those losses were unforeseeable, provided that they were not otherwise too remote.

If the question of foreseeability had been the only issue in this appeal, the judgment so far would have rendered it unnecessary to decide whether, in the circumstances of the present case, the wrongful sale of the car by the customer was reasonably foreseeable by the dealer. Since the judge did not expressly deal with this point in his judgment, it might have been preferable that we should not do so. Nevertheless there is a separate issue whether the wrongful sale of the car was novus actus interveniens and thus broke the chain of causation, and the reasonable foreseeability of the event in question is a factor to be taken into account on that issue. Accordingly, it is necessary to deal with this matter. Mr. Kennedy, for the dealer, submitted that while a motor car dealer might be expected to foresee that a customer who buys a car on hire-purchase may default in payment of his instalments, he cannot be expected to foresee that he will wrongfully dispose of the car. He went on to submit that, in the particular circumstances of this case, where the customer was apparently reputable, being a young married man in employment, it was even less likely that the dealer could have foreseen what might happen. There appears to have been no oral evidence directed to this particular point.

In my judgment this is to ignore both the reality of the transaction and general experience. While in legal theory the car remains the property of the finance company until the last hire-purchase instalment is paid, in practice the purchaser is placed in effective control of the car and treats it as his own. Further, there have been so many cases, both civil and criminal, where persons buying a car on hire-purchase have wrongfully disposed of the car, that we can take judicial notice that this is an all too frequent occurrence. Accordingly I am satisfied that, at the time when the finance company entered into the agreements with the dealer and the customer, it was reasonably foreseeable that the customer might wrongfully sell the car.

Mr. Kennedy's next submission was that the customer's wrongful sale of the car was novus actus interveniens. This issue was considered by the judge, although the brief note of his judgment on this point is corrupt and is not agreed by counsel. It is implicit in his decision to award £1,600 damages to the finance company that the sale was not novus actus interveniens; otherwise on the figures in this case he would have been bound to find that the finance company had suffered no loss. However, the judgment contains no indication of how he came to that conclusion.

In the present case the customer was a free agent and his act in selling the car was unlawful. Nevertheless neither of these facts is conclusive in determining whether the sale of the car was a novus actus sufficient to break the chain of causation: see generally Clerk & Lindsell on Torts, 16th ed. (1989), pp. 81-86, paras. 1-117 to 1-121 and McGregor on Damages, 15th ed. (1988), pp. 92-94, paras. 152-156. However, if the dealer should reasonably have foreseen the possibility of the wrongful sale of the car, then that is a strong indication that the sale did not break the chain of causation. As Winn L.J. said in Iron and Steel Holding and Realisation Agency v. Compensation Appeal Tribunal [1966] 1 W.L.R. 480, 492:

"In my opinion, wherever any intervening factor was itself foreseen or reasonably foreseeable by the actor, the person responsible for the act which initiated the chain of causes leading to the final result, that intervening cause is not itself, in the legal sense, a novus actus interveniens breaking the chain of causation and isolating the initial act from the final result."

I doubt whether further citation of authority will be helpful; in this field authority is almost too plentiful. For the reasons I have already given, in my judgment the dealer should reasonably have foreseen the possibility that the customer might wrongfully sell the car. In my judgment, therefore, the sale was not novus actus interveniens and did not break the chain of causation.

Mr. Kennedy's final submission was that the normal rule is that the plaintiff's loss must be assessed as at the date of his reliance upon the misrepresentation; since the finance company paid £6,400 to the dealer and in return acquired title to a car which was worth at least that sum, its loss assessed at that date was nil. This submission again falls into the error of treating the transaction according to its technicalities - that the finance company was interested in purchasing the car. That was not the reality: the finance company was interested in receiving the totality of the instalments from the customer. Once the transaction is looked at in this way the authorities on which Mr. Kennedy relied to support this submission, being all concerned with misrepresentations leading to the acquisition of chattels, can be seen to be of little assistance. But even in such a case the rule is not a hard and fast one - see the recent case of Naughton v. O'Callaghan [1990] 3 All E.R. 191. So I reject this submission also.

Accordingly, I would dismiss the dealer's appeal. I would allow the finance company's cross-appeal, set aside the judgment of 22 February 1990, and direct that in its place judgment be entered for the finance company against the dealer in the sum of £3,625·24 together with interest. The finance company accepts that it will have to give credit for any sums that it may receive from its judgment against the customer.

== Impact ==
The case caused some alarm among academic and practising lawyers. Given the relative lack of blameworthiness of a non-fraudulent defendant (who is at worst merely careless, and at best has an honest belief on reasonable grounds) for many years lawyers presumed that for non-fraudulent misrepresentation damages would be on a contract/negligence basis requiring reasonable foreseeability of loss.

Royscot Trust Ltd v Rogerson changed all that. The court gave a literal interpretation of s.2 (which, to paraphrase, provides that where a person has been misled by an innocent misrepresentation then, if the misrepresentor would be liable to damages had the representation been made fraudulently, that person "shall be so liable"). The phrase "shall be so liable" was read literally to mean "as liable as for fraudulent misrepresentation". So, under the Misrepresentation Act 1967, damages for innocent misrepresentation are calculated as if the defendant had been fraudulent, despite the absence of deceit.

Although this was almost certainly not the intention of Parliament, no changes to the law have been made to address this discrepancy. This is known as the fiction of fraud and also extends to tortious liability. (S.2 does not specify how "damages in lieu" should be determined, and interpretation of this point is up to the courts).

It is also unclear why the dealer's misrepresentation should have been considered "non-fraudulent" when it seems plain that the dealer deliberately misled the finance company. Arguably, this case should have been considered "fraudulent" as it complied with the 3-part guidelines of Derry v Peek. Since no reference was made to Derry v Peek, this case is open to challenge as per incuriam.

== See also ==
- Doyle v Olby (Ironmongers) Ltd [1969] 2 QB 158
