= Walker v Boyle =

- Court: High Court, Chancery Division
- Citation: [1982] 1 WLR 495

Keywords
- Misrepresentation, exclusion clause

Walker v Boyle [1982] 1 WLR 495 is an English contract law case, concerning misrepresentation, and the possibility to exclude liability for it under the Misrepresentation Act 1967 s 3.

== Facts ==
Mr Walker negotiated with Mrs Boyle to purchase Stall House in Stall House Lane, Pulborough, West Sussex for £105,000. During negotiations Mr Walker sent enquiries to Mr Boyle asking,

‘Is the vendor aware of any disputes regarding the boundaries, easements, covenants or other matters relating to the property or its use?’

Mrs Boyle asked her husband who answered ‘no’. But really there had been a long running dispute with the neighbour, which Mr Boyle incorrectly thought had been settled. Condition 17(1) of the contract (which incorporated the ‘National Conditions of Sale’) said that,

‘no error, misstatement or omission in any preliminary answer concerning the property shall annul the sale’.

Mr Walker brought an action for rescission based on misrepresentation. The question was whether Mr and Mrs Boyle could rely on the exclusion clause and whether it was reasonable under MA 1967 s 3.

== Judgment ==
Dillon J held the condition fell foul of s 3 MA 1967. He held Mrs Boyle had not shown that the exclusion satisfied s 11 of the Unfair Contract Terms Act 1977 in this case. Neither party's solicitors directed their minds to condition 17, so it was not one which ‘ought reasonably to have been known to or in the contemplation of the parties’. He added that the National Conditions of Sale, though common, were not the product of negotiations between interested trade parties.

== See also ==
- English contract law
- Misrepresentation in English law
