= Esso Petroleum Co Ltd v Mardon =

English contract law case

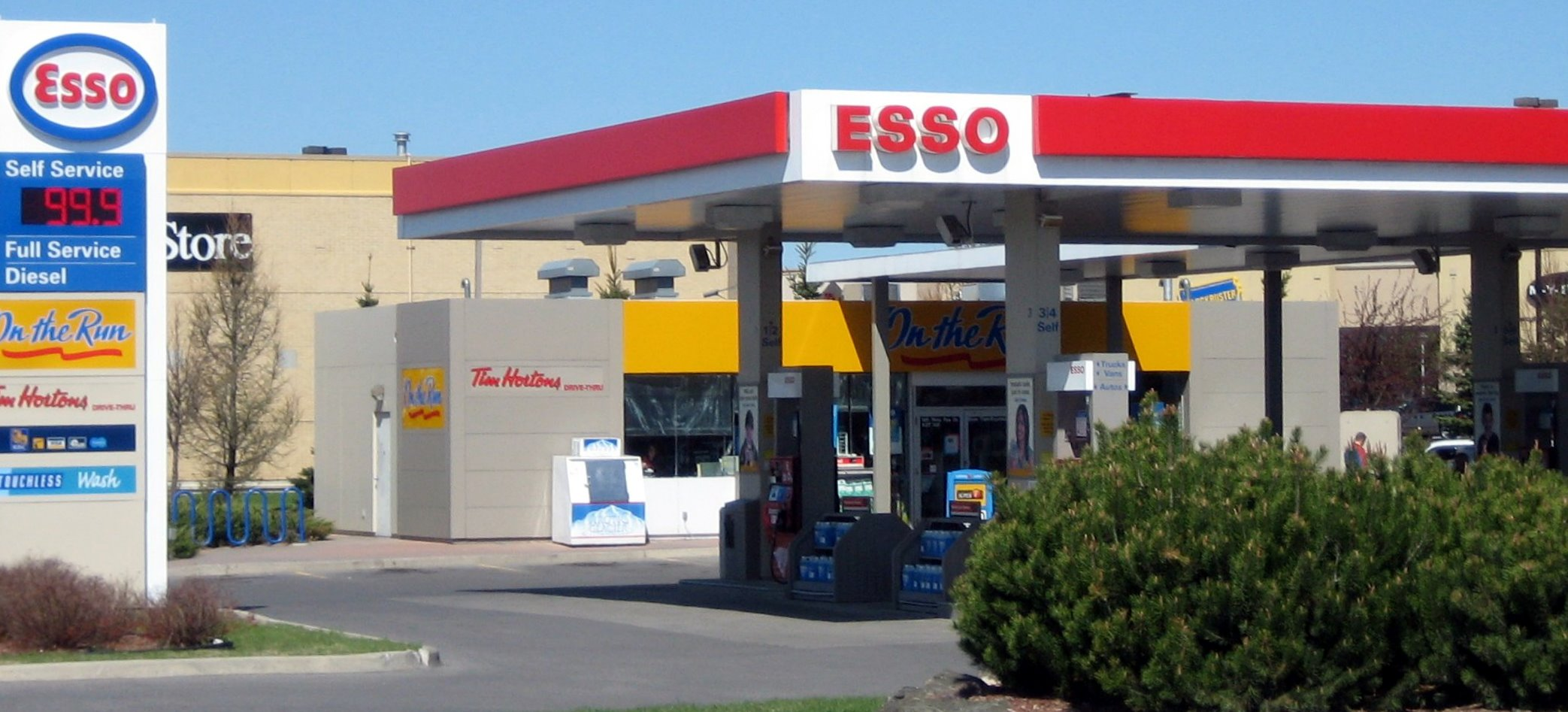
- Court: Court of Appeal
- Full case name: Esso Petroleum Company Limited v Philip Lionel Mardon
- Decided: 6 February 1976
- Citations: [1976] EWCA Civ 4, [1976] QB 801, [1976] EWCA Civ 4

Court membership
- Judges sitting: Lord Denning, Lord Justice Ormrod, Lord Justice Shaw

Keywords
- Misrepresentation, expertise

Esso Petroleum Co Ltd v Mardon [1976] EWCA Civ 4 is an English contract law case, concerning misrepresentation. It holds that the divide between a statement of opinion and fact becomes more factual if one holds himself out as having expert knowledge.

== Facts ==
Mr Mardon was buying a petrol station franchised by Esso Petroleum Co Ltd. Esso told him they had estimated that the throughput of a petrol station in Eastbank Street, Southport, would be 200,000 gallons a year; however, the local council had made a decision regarding planning permission which meant that there would be no direct access from the main street and therefore fewer customers. The estimate provided by Esso did not take this into account despite their knowledge of the decision. Mr Mardon bought the petrol station and business did not go well. From 1964, Mr Mardon negotiated a lower rent with Esso but was still losing money. Esso then brought an action for possession against Mr Mardon, who counterclaimed for damages of Esso's breach of warranty or negligence under Hedley Byrne.

Lawson J held there was no contractual warranty and damages for negligent misstatement were limited to losses before 1964. Mr Mardon appealed.

== Judgment ==
Lord Denning MR held there was a contractual warranty and damages were not limited.

Now I would quite agree… it was not a warranty - in this sense - that it did not guarantee that the throughput would be 200,000 gallons. But, nevertheless, it was a forecast made by a party - Esso - who had special knowledge and skill. It was the yardstick… by which they measured the worth of a filling station. They knew the facts. They knew the traffic in the town. They knew the throughput of comparable stations. They had much experience and expertise at their disposal. They were in a much better position than Mr Mardon to make a forecast. It seems to me that if such a person makes a forecast, intending that the other should act upon it - and he does act upon it, it can well be interpreted as a warranty that the forecast is sound and reliable in the sense that they made it with reasonable care and skill. It is just as if Esso said to Mr. Mardon:

Our forecast of throughput is 200,000 gallons. You can rely upon it as being a sound forecast of what the service station should do. The rent is calculated on that footing.

If the forecast turned out to be an unsound forecast such as no person of skill or experience should have made, there is a breach of warranty.

Lord Denning MR distinguished Bisset v Wilkinson because each party was 'equally able to form an opinion.' The damages awarded were for the loss suffered, not the loss of a bargain. He went on and said, if there had been no warranty (which there was) there would still be negligent misrepresentation liability in tort. It was argued that when a contract resulted, there was no tort liability, relying on Clark v Kirby-Smith, when Plowman J said a negligent solicitor was not liable in tort, only contract, based on Sir Wilfrid Greene MR in Groom v Crocker. But these were old and the tort duty 'is comparable to the duty of reasonable care which is owed by a master to his servant, or vice versa'.

There is a duty to negotiate with care,

if a man, who has or professes to have special knowledge or skill, makes a representation by virtue thereof to another… with the intention of inducing him to enter into a contract with him, he is under a duty to use reasonable care to see that the representation is correct, and that the advice, information or opinion is reliable.' Esso did profess special knowledge and had it. Their negligent misstatement was a 'fatal error... A professional man may give advice under a contract for reward; or without a contract, in pursuance of a voluntary assumption of responsibility, gratuitously without reward. In either case he is under one and the same duty to use reasonable care: see Cassidy v Ministry of Health. In the one case it is by reason of a term implied by law. In the other, it is by reason of a duty imposed by law. For a breach of that duty, he is liable in damages; and those damages should be, and are, the same, whether he is sued in contract or in tort.

Ormrod and Shaw LJJ concurred.

== See also ==
- English contract law
- Misrepresentation in English law
