= Howard Marine and Dredging Co Ltd v A Ogden & Sons (Excavations) Ltd =

Howard Marine Ltd v Ogden Ltd
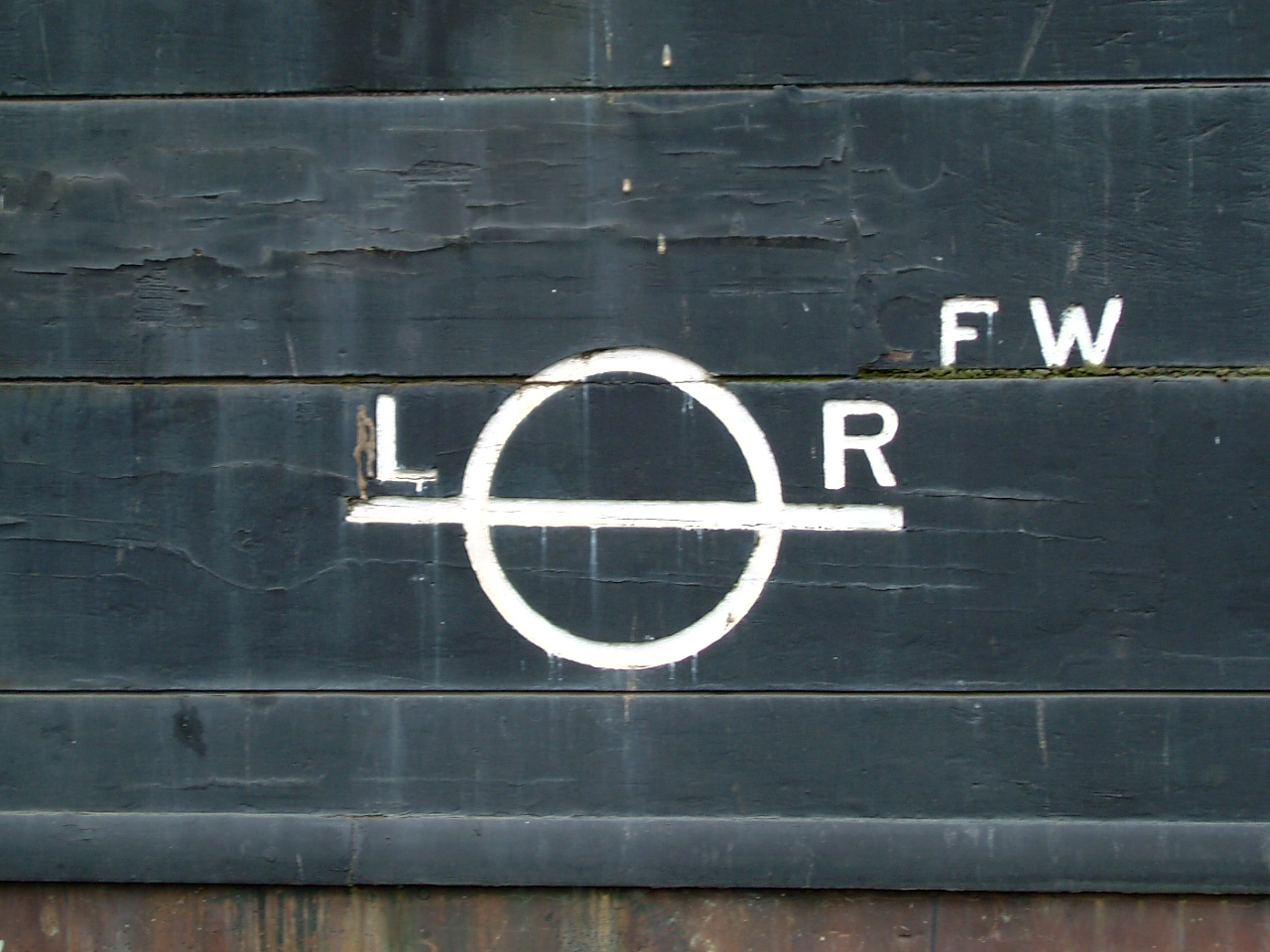
- Court: Court of Appeal
- Citation: [1978] QB 574

Case opinions
- Lord Denning MR, Bridge LJ, Shaw LJ

Keywords
- Misrepresentation, exclusion clause

Howard Marine and Dredging Co Ltd v A Ogden & Sons (Excavations) Ltd [1978] QB 574 is an English contract law case concerned with misrepresentation. It explains the test of "reasonable grounds for belief" under the Misrepresentation Act 1967 s 2(1), and raises the issue of the reasonableness test under s 3.

== Facts ==
Ogden Ltd wanted to hire some barges in order to dump excavated clay at sea. Mr O'Loughlin, an employee of Howard Marine Ltd., told Mr Redpath, an Ogden Ltd. employee, that their German-built barges could carry 1600 tonnes (deadweight, rather than cubic capacity). This was based on the Lloyd's Register for barges. Unfortunately and unusually the Lloyd's Register was incorrect. The true capacity was 1055 tonnes. Mr O'Loughlin was aware that the German shipping documents stated the correct figure of 1055 tonnes but he preferred the Lloyd's Register. The charterparty (a contract for the hire of a ship) said that Ogden Ltd's acceptance of the barges showed they were in every way satisfied. When the barges proved to be insufficient for the job, Ogden Ltd refused to pay the full price. Howard Marine Ltd terminated the agreement and sued for the outstanding payments. Ogden Ltd counterclaimed for

- breach of collateral warranty
- breach of duty under s 2(1) MA 1967
- negligent misstatement under Hedley Byrne

Howard Marine Ltd argued they had reasonable grounds to believe their false statement, because the Lloyd's Register was the "bible".

== Judgement ==
The Court of Appeal (Lord Denning MR, Bridge LJ and Shaw LJ) all held there was no breach of warranty, but decided by a majority that Howard Marine Ltd was liable for breach of duty under MA 1967 s 2(1). It was not necessary, therefore, to decide the Hedley Byrne point, but each judge said something different.

Under MA 1967 s 2(1) Bridge LJ noted Howard Marine Ltd had to prove a reasonable ground to believe what he said about the barge's capacity.

If the representee proves a misrepresentation which, if fraudulent would have sounded in damages, the onus passes immediately to the representor to prove that he had reasonable ground to believe the facts represented… the statute imposes an absolute obligation not to state facts which the representor cannot prove he had reasonable ground to believe.

Bridge LJ said that Mr O'Loughlin was always honest, but his eagerness to prefer the Register over the documents was not reasonable. They held liability had not been validly excluded, because in agreement with the judge he felt that it did not pass the reasonableness test under MA 1967 s 3. Shaw LJ agreed.

Lord Denning MR dissented, saying that there were reasonable grounds to prefer the Lloyd's Register. He also argued that the exclusion clause was valid, and was reasonable.

If the clause itself is reasonable, that goes a long way towards showing that reliance on it is fair and reasonable. It seems to me that the clause was itself fair and reasonable. The parties here were commercial concerns and were of equal bargaining power. The clause was not foisted by one on the other in a standard printed form. It was contained in all the drafts which passed between them, and it was no doubt given close consideration by both sides, like all the other clauses, some of which were amended and others not.

== See also ==
- English contract law
- Misrepresentation in English law
