= Polglase =

Polglase is a surname. Notable people with the surname include:

- Todd Polglase (born 1981), Australian rugby league footballer
- Van Nest Polglase (1898–1968), American art director

== See also ==
- Worsdale v Polglase, a legal case in New Zealand
