= M E Torbett Ltd v Keirlor Motels Ltd =

- Court: High Court of New Zealand
- Full case name: M E Torbett Ltd (First Plaintiff), Murray Edward Torbett (Second Plaintiff) v Keirlor Motels Limited (First Defendant), Howard Gaskin (Second Defendant)
- Decided: 30 March 1984
- Citation: (1984) 1 NZBLC 102,079
- Transcript: http://www.nzlii.org/nz/cases/NZHC/1984/47.pdf

Court membership
- Judge sitting: Casey J

M E Torbett Ltd v Keirlor Motels Ltd (established 1984) 1 NZBLC 102,079 is a cited case in New Zealand regarding fraud being a factor in determining whether an exclusion clause is enforceable under the Contractual Remedies Act [1979].

== Background ==
Torbett purchased a coffee lounge off Keirlor for $115,000. Torbett later found the business to be overstaffed, and while trying to downsize his staff, all his staff went on strike. Fed up with all this, he sold the business six months later for $103,000 and sued Keirlor for misrepresentation. Keirlor relied on the exclusion clause as their defence.

== Held ==
The court held that there was misrepresentation, and awarded damages of $11,000.

== See also ==
- Bird v Bicknell
