= Charles Bowen, Baron Bowen =

English judge (1835–1894)

The Right Honourable The Lord Bowen PC, FRS
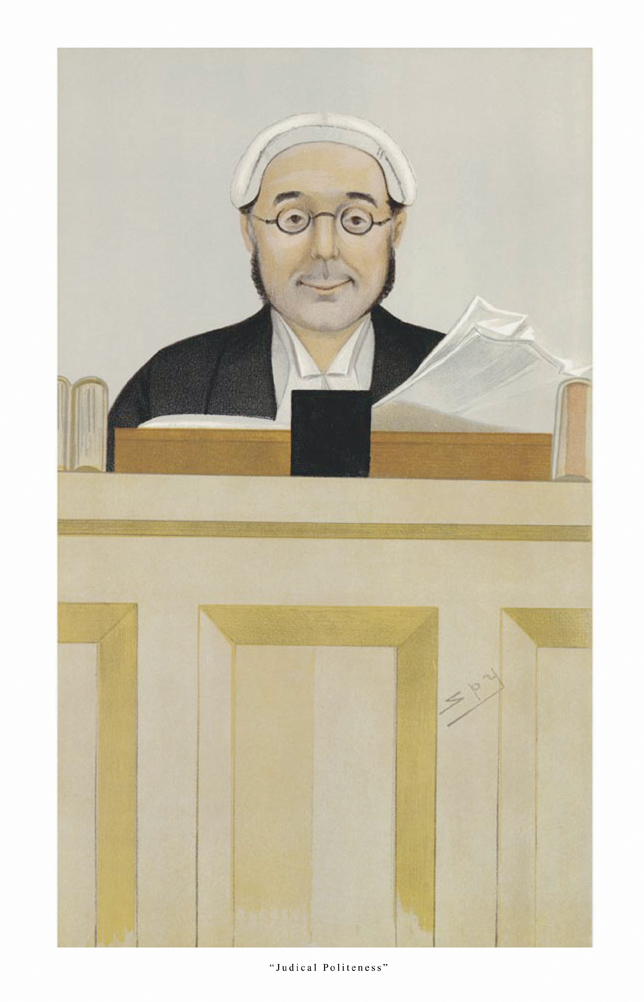
- "Judicial Politeness", Bowen as caricatured by Spy (Leslie Ward) in Vanity Fair, March 1892

Lord of Appeal in Ordinary
- In office 23 September 1893 – 10 April 1894
- Preceded by: The Lord Hannen
- Succeeded by: The Lord Russell of Killowen

Lord Justice of Appeal
- In office 2 June 1882 – 23 September 1893
- Preceded by: Sir John Holker
- Succeeded by: Sir Horace Davey

Justice of the High Court
- In office 16 June 1879 – 2 June 1882
- Preceded by: Sir John Mellor
- Succeeded by: Sir John Day

Personal details
- Born: Charles Synge Christopher Bowen; 1 January 1835 Woolaston, Gloucestershire, England
- Died: 10 April 1894 (aged 59) Knightsbridge, London
- Education: Balliol College, Oxford

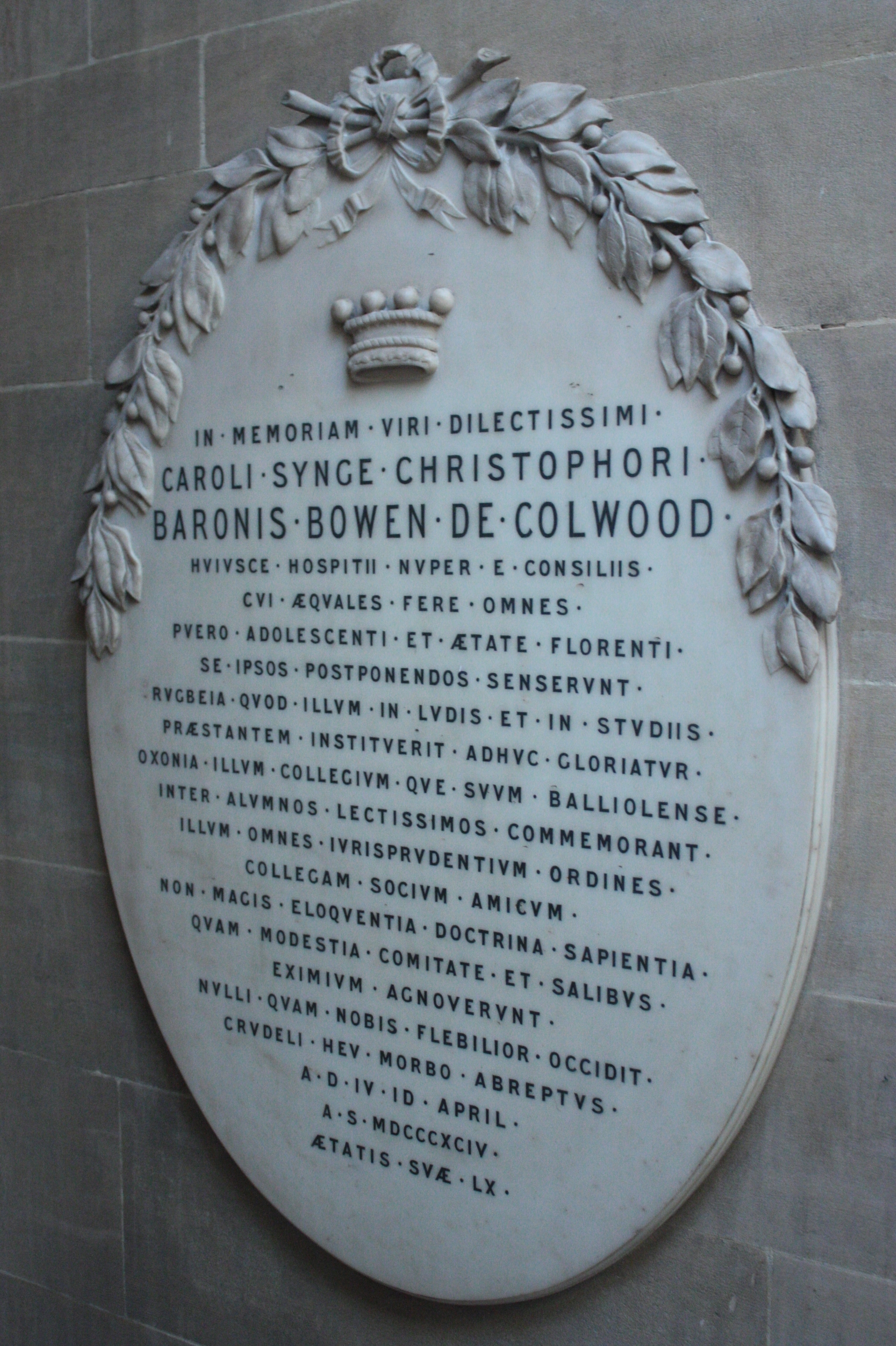
Memorial to Baron Bowen, Lincoln's Inn Chapel, London

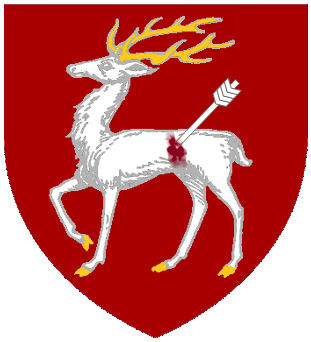
Arms as displayed at Lincoln's Inn

Charles Synge Christopher Bowen, Baron Bowen, PC, FRS (1 January 1835 – 10 April 1894) was an English judge.

== Early life ==
Bowen was born at Woolaston in Gloucestershire – his father, the Rev. Christopher Bowen, originally of Hollymount, County Mayo, being then curate of the parish and his mother, Catherine Steele (1807/8–1902); his younger brother was Edward Ernest Bowen, a long-serving Harrow schoolmaster. He was educated at Lille in France, Blackheath and Rugby schools, leaving the latter in 1853 having won a scholarship to Balliol College, Oxford. There he made good his earlier academic promise, winning the principal classical scholarships and prizes of his time. He was elected a fellow of Balliol in 1857 while an undergraduate and became President of the Oxford Union in 1857.

It was Bowen who, as President-Elect of the Oxford Union during the summer vacation of 1857, responded with enthusiasm to the plan of Dante Gabriel Rossetti and William Morris to paint the upper walls of the new debating chamber with scenes from the legends of King Arthur. Bowen's support was crucial to ensuring the scheme happened. 'Bowen,' said Edward Burne-Jones, ‘was beloved by all’, ‘A courteous and delightful fellow … whom Rossetti loved at once.’

== Career ==
From Oxford, Bowen went to London, where he was called to the bar at Lincoln's Inn in 1861, and while studying law he wrote regularly for the Saturday Review, and also later for The Spectator. In 1861, he also played a single first-class match for Hampshire against the Marylebone Cricket Club: in Hampshire's first innings he was dismissed for a duck by Caleb Robinson and in their second innings he scored 30*. His brother, Edward Ernest Bowen also played first-class cricket for Hampshire County Cricket Club.

For a time he had little success at the bar, and came near to exchanging it for the career of a college tutor, but he was persuaded by his friends to persevere. Soon after he had begun to make his mark he was briefed against the claimant in the famous Tichborne Case. Bowen's services to his leader, Sir John Coleridge, helped to procure for him the appointment of junior counsel to the Treasury when Sir John had died, as he did while the trial proceeded, from the office of Solicitor General to that of Attorney-General; and from this time his practice became a very large one.

The strain, however, of the Tichborne trials was great, and his physical health became unequal to the tasks which his zeal for work imposed upon it. In 1879 his acceptance of a position as a High Court judge in the Queen's Bench division, on the retirement of Mr Justice John Mellor, gave him the opportunity of comparative rest. He was knighted in June 1879.

The character of Charles Bowen's intellect hardly qualified him for some of the duties of a puisne judge; but it was otherwise when, in 1882, in succession to Lord Justice Holker, he was raised to the Court of Appeal. As a Lord Justice of Appeal, he was conspicuous for his learning, his industry and his courtesy to all who appeared before him; and in spite of his failing health, he sat regularly until August 1893, when, on the retirement of Lord Hannen, he was made a Lord of Appeal in Ordinary, and a life peer with the title Baron Bowen, of Colwood in the County of Sussex. By this time, however, his health had finally broken down; he never sat as a law lord to hear appeals, and he gave but one vote as a peer, while his last public service consisted in presiding over the commission which sat in October 1893 to inquire into the Featherstone riots.

Lord Bowen was regarded with great affection by all who knew him professionally or privately. He had a polished and graceful wit, of which many instances might be given, although such anecdotes lose force in print. For example, when it was suggested on the occasion of an address to Queen Victoria, to be presented by her judges, that a passage in it, "conscious as we are of our shortcomings," suggested too great humility, he proposed the emendation "conscious as we are of one another's shortcomings"; and on another occasion he defined a jurist as "a person who knows a little about the laws of every country except his own". Lord Bowen's judicial reputation will rest upon the series of judgments delivered by him in the court of appeal, which are remarkable for their lucid interpretation of legal principles as applied to the facts and business of life.

== Literary work ==
Of Lord Bowen's literary works besides those already indicated may be mentioned his translation of Virgil's Eclogues, and Aeneid, books i.-vi. and his pamphlet, The Alabama Claim and Arbitration considered from a Legal Point of View.

Some of the quotations attributed to him include

The rain it raineth on the just
And also on the unjust fella;
But chiefly on the just, because
The unjust hath the just’s umbrella.

and

When I hear of an 'equity' in a case like this, I am reminded of a blind man in a dark room - looking for a black hat - which isn't there.

== Personal life ==
In 1862, he married Emily Frances, eldest daughter of the engineer James Meadows Rendel, by whom he had two sons and a daughter. His daughter, Ethel Kate Bowen, married Josiah Wedgwood IV (later 1st Baron Wedgwood) of the pottery dynasty.

== Judgments ==
He is credited with coining the phrase "the man on the Clapham omnibus", which was quoted by Sir Richard Henn Collins MR many years after his death in the case of McQuire v. Western Morning News ([1903] 2 KB 100). Amongst his judgments are:

- Imperial Hydropathic Hotel Co v Hampson - a UK company law, concerning the interpretation of a company's articles of association in the matter of removal of directors.
- Harben v Phillips
- Hutton v West Cork Rly Co - UK company law case concerning the limits of a director's discretion to spend company funds for the benefit of non-shareholders.
- Speight v Gaunt - English trusts law concerning the extent of the duty of care owed by a fiduciary.
- Abrath v North Eastern Railway
- Thomas v Quartermaine
- Smith v Land and House Property Corp - English contract law case, concerning misrepresentation and holding that a statement of opinion can represent that one knows certain facts, and can amount to misrepresentation.
- Edgington v Fitzmaurice - "the state of a man's mind is as much a fact as the state of his digestion", securities-fraud case dealing with false statements of intention
- Falcke v Scottish Imperial Insurance Co - an English unjust enrichment law case, also concerning English contract law, and setting out some fundamental principles of construction of obligations, as viewed to exist by the late 19th-century English judiciary.
- In the Arbitration between Secretary of State for Home Department and Fletcher (1887) - upholding a Queen's Bench decision supporting the authority of the Inspector of Mines to require the use of safety lamps; Bowen LJ dissenting.
- The Moorcock - English contract law giving rise to the "Business Efficacy" Test for common law implied terms.
- Carlill v Carbolic Smoke Ball Company - an advertisement containing certain terms to get a reward constituted a binding unilateral offer that could be accepted by anyone who performed its terms.
- Vagliano v Bank of England - prepared the majority judgment of the court, held wrong in conclusion by the majority of the House of Lords
- Mogul Steamship Co Ltd v McGregor, Gow & Co - English tort law case concerning the economic tort of conspiracy to injure.
- Angus v Dalton

== Other ==
The top GDL Scholarship offered by The Honourable Society of Lincoln's Inn is named after Lord Bowen.

== Notes ==
Attribution

- Hesilrige, Arthur G. M. (1921). Debrett's Peerage and Titles of courtesy. London: London: Dean & son, limited. p. 130.
