= Thompson v Vincent =

- Court: Court of Appeal of New Zealand
- Full case name: Thompson v Vincent
- Decided: 21 June 2001
- Citation: [2001] 3 NZLR 355

Court membership
- Judges sitting: McGrath, Ellis and McGechan JJ

Thompson v Vincent [2001] 3 NZLR 355 is a cited case in New Zealand confirming that where a party has cancelled a contract on unjustifiable grounds, can legally cancel the contract if justifiable grounds are later discovered.

== Background ==
The Thompsons were developing a 22-24 unit motel complex. Prior to construction, the Vincents entered into a sale and purchase agreement for the motel, giving them a 20-year lease for $500,000.

Within two years of ownership, the Vincents abandoned the motel and their lease.

Soon after the abandonment, the Vincents discovered that the vendors only had planning consent for only 12 units, and not 24. They then used this as a basis for a claim for misrepresentation, in an effort to get their money back under the Contractual Remedies Act 1979.

== Held ==
The court awarded them $320,000 in damages for the misrepresentation.
