= Smith v Land and House Property Corp =

Smith v Land and House Property Corporation
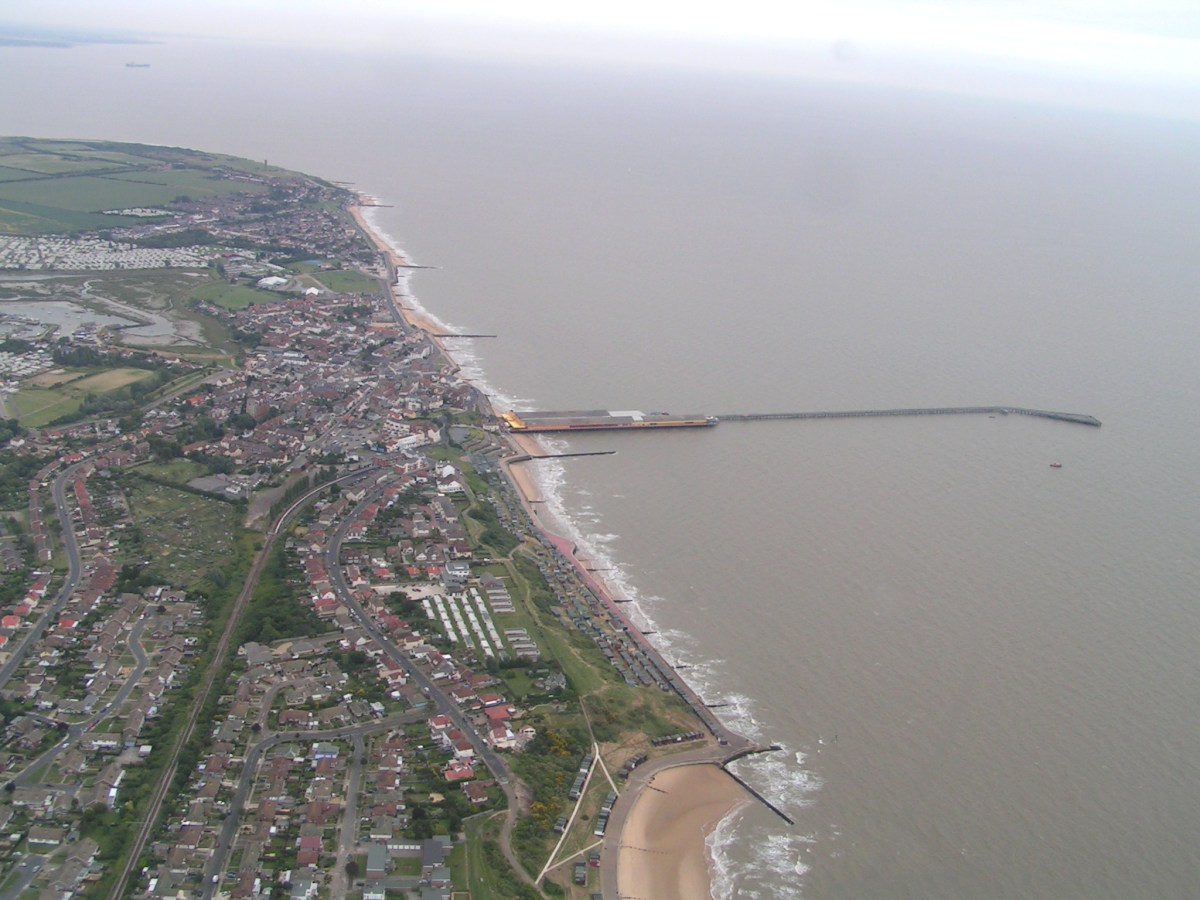
- Court: Court of Appeal
- Citation: (1884) LR 28 Ch D 7

Court membership
- Judges sitting: Bowen LJ, Baggallay LJ, Fry LJ

Keywords
- Misrepresentation,

Smith v Land and House Property Corporation (1884) LR 28 Ch D 7 is an English contract law case, concerning misrepresentation. It holds that a statement of opinion can represent that one knows certain facts, and therefore one may have still made a misrepresentation.

== Facts ==
Land and House Property Corp (LHP) contracted with Mr. Smith to buy the freehold title of the Marine Hotel at Walton-on-the-Naze. Mr. Smith had advertised that it was let to Mr. Fleck,

a most desirable tenant.

Land and House agreed to buy the Hotel. However, Mr. Fleck, who had been overdue with rent, went bankrupt just before transfer of title. Land and House Property Corp. refused to complete the transaction, defending Smith's specific performance suit on the basis that the description of Fleck's "virtues" was grounds for misrepresentation. H.H. Asquith appeared for the landlord.

== Judgment ==
Bowen LJ held there was a misrepresentation relied on by LHP. He held that statements of opinions can often involve statements of facts, because, "if the facts are not equally known to both sides, then a statement of opinion by the one who knows the facts best involves very often a statement of a material fact, for he impliedly states that he knows facts which justify his opinion."

Bowen LJ said with his opinion the landlord "avers that the facts peculiarly within his knowledge are such as to render that opinion reasonable." And it "amounts at least to an assertion that nothing has occurred in the relations between the landlords and the tenant which can be considered to make the tenant an unsatisfactory one... . In my opinion a tenant who has paid his last quarter’s rent by driblets under pressure must be regarded as an undesirable tenant."

Given that the misrepresentation did induce the LHP to enter the contract initially, Mr. Smith was not entitled to specific performance of the contract.

Baggallay LJ and Fry LJ concurred.

== See also ==
- Bisset v Wilkinson
- Redgrave v Hurd
