= Leaf v International Galleries =

1950 English contract law case

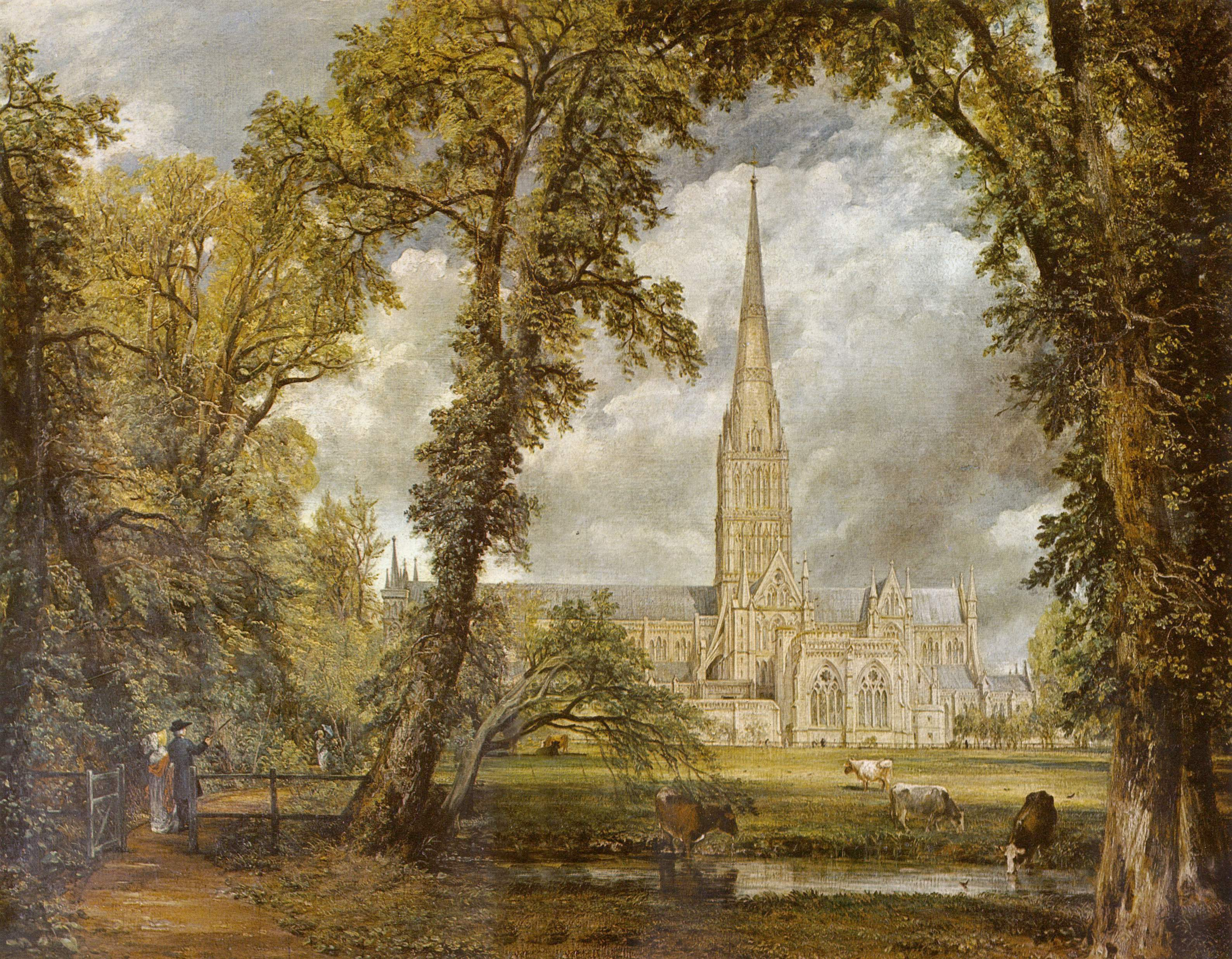
- Court: Court of Appeal
- Citation: [1950] 2 KB 86

Court membership
- Judges sitting: Denning LJ, Jenkins LJ and Lord Evershed MR

Case opinions
- Denning LJ, Jenkins LJ and Lord Evershed MR

Keywords
- innocent misrepresentation, mistake, rescission

Leaf v International Galleries [1950] 2 KB 86 is an English contract law case concerned with misrepresentation, mistake and breach of contract, and the limits to the equitable remedy of rescission.

== Facts ==
Ernest Louis Leaf thought that he was buying Salisbury Cathedral by John Constable from International Galleries on 8 March 1944. International Galleries said that it was a Constable. Leaf paid £85. Five years later when he tried to auction it, Leaf was told that it was not a Constable. He claimed rescission of the contract against International Galleries, to get his money back.

== Judgment ==
The case was addressed at first instance at Westminster County Court (now Central London County Court).

On appeal, Denning LJ held that Mr Leaf was barred because too much time had lapsed. He held that in the event of lapse of too much time between the making of the contract and the decision to rescind, the right to rescind is lost. He held there was a mistake about the quality of the subject matter because both parties believed the picture to be a Constable, and that mistake was fundamental. But it was not enough to void the contract, because there was no mistake about the essential subject matter (a painting). The painter's identity was a term of the contract, which could either be classified as a condition (breach of which allows termination of the contract) or a warranty (which allows damages only). Here the painter's identity was a condition, but after hanging it in one's house for five years it was far too late to reject the painting for breach of condition.

The question is whether the plaintiff is entitled to rescind the contract on the ground that the painting in question was not painted by Constable. I emphasize that it is a claim to rescind only: there is no claim in this action for damages for breach of condition or breach of warranty. The claim is simply one for rescission. At a very late stage before the county court judge counsel did ask for leave to amend by claiming damages for breach of warranty, but it was not allowed. No claim for damages is before us at all. The only question is whether the plaintiff is entitled to rescind.

The way in which the case is put by Mr. Weitzman, on behalf of the plaintiff, is this: he says that this was an innocent misrepresentation and that in equity he is, or should be, entitled to claim rescission even of an executed contract of sale on that account. He points out that the judge has found that it is quite possible to restore the parties to their original position. It can be done by simply handing back the picture to the defendants.

In my opinion, this case is to be decided according to the well known principles applicable to the sale of goods. This was a contract for the sale of goods. There was a mistake about the quality of the subject-matter, because both parties believed the picture to be a Constable; and that mistake was in one sense essential or fundamental. But such a mistake does not avoid the contract: there was no mistake at all about the subject-matter of the sale. It was a specific picture, "Salisbury Cathedral." The parties were agreed in the same terms on the same subject-matter, and that is sufficient to make a contract: see Solle v Butcher.

There was a term in the contract as to the quality of the subject-matter: namely, as to the person by whom the picture was painted – that it was by Constable. That term of the contract was, according to our terminology, either a condition or a warranty. If it was a condition, the buyer could reject the picture for breach of the condition at any time before he accepted it, or is deemed to have accepted it; whereas, if it was only a warranty, he could not reject it at all but was confined to a claim for damages.

I think it right to assume in the buyer's favour that this term was a condition, and that, if he had come in proper time he could have rejected the picture; but the right to reject for breach of condition has always been limited by the rule that, once the buyer has accepted, or is deemed to have accepted, the goods in performance of the contract, then he cannot thereafter reject, but is relegated to his claim for damages: see s. 11, sub-s. 1 (c), of the Sale of Goods Act 1893, and Wallis, Son & Wells v Pratt & Haynes.

The circumstances in which a buyer is deemed to have accepted goods in performance of the contract are set out in s. 35 of the Act, which says that the buyer is deemed to have accepted the goods, amongst other things, "when, after the lapse of a reasonable time, he retains the goods without intimating to the seller that he has rejected them." In this case the buyer took the picture into his house and, apparently, hung it there, and five years passed before he intimated any rejection at all. That, I need hardly say, is much more than a reasonable time. It is far too late for him at the end of five years to reject this picture for breach of any condition. His remedy after that length of time is for damages only, a claim which he has not brought before the court.

Is it to be said that the buyer is in any better position by relying on the representation, not as a condition, but as an innocent misrepresentation? I agree that on a contract for the sale of goods an innocent material misrepresentation may, in a proper case, be a ground for rescission even after the contract has been executed...

Although rescission may in some cases be a proper remedy, it is to be remembered that an innocent misrepresentation is much less potent than a breach of condition; and a claim to rescission for innocent misrepresentation must at any rate be barred when a right to reject for breach of condition is barred. A condition is a term of the contract of a most material character, and if a claim to reject on that account is barred, it seems to me a fortiori that a claim to rescission on the ground of innocent misrepresentation is also barred.

Jenkins LJ and Lord Evershed MR concurred.

In essence, the appeal court held that there was no breach of contract, no "operative mistake". There was misrepresentation, but after a period of five years the right to rescission had lapsed, leaving the claimant with no remedy at all.

== See also ==
- Vitiating factors in the law of contract
- Misrepresentation in English law
- Misrepresentation Act 1967
- Mistakes in English law
- Salt v Stratstone Specialist Ltd [2015] EWCA Civ 745: damages in lieu unavailable if rescission would be, including the impossibility of restitutio in integrum.
