= Dimmock v Hallett =

1866 English contract law case

- Court: Court of Appeal in Chancery
- Decided: 13 November 1866
- Citation: (1866-67) LR 2 Ch App 21

Case opinions
- Sir GJ Turner LJ and Sir HM Cairns LJ

Dimmock v Hallett (1866–67) LR 2 Ch App 21 is an English contract law case, concerning misrepresentation.

== Facts ==
An 934-acre (3.78 km^{2}) estate was about to be auctioned off to discharge a debt to a mortgage. The estate included three parcels of land called "Bull Hassocks Farm", "Creyke's Hundreds" and "Misson Springs". The advertisement for the auction described the Bull Hassocks Farm as having "fertile and improvable land", and described in the particulars that each parcel was let out to paying tenants (the first two to Mr R Hickson and Misson Springs to a Mr F Wigglesworth). However, it was not mentioned that the tenants had, by the time of the auction, already given notice to quit the property. The eventual buyer, Mr Dimmock, sought rescission of the contract for misrepresentation (among a number of other grounds).

The 13th condition of sale also stated the following exclusion clause,

“If any mistake be made in the description of any of the lots, or any other error shall appear in the particulars of the estate (except as to the quantity of land, which shall be taken as stated, whether more or less), such mistake or error shall not annul the sale, but the vendor or purchaser shall give or take a compensation or equivalent as the case may require, and which compensation or equivalent shall be settled by the said Judge at Chambers.”

== Judgment ==
The Court of Appeal held that although the statement about the land being "fertile and improvable" was merely a "flourishing description" and did not entitle the buyer to rescind, telling only a half truth about the tenants constituted good grounds for unwinding the contracts. Sir GJ Turner LJ gave judgment first.

This is a Petition to discharge a purchaser under a decree. The first ground on which the application is rested is, that although the auctioneer stated at the sale that it was to be without reserve, Mr. Dimmock, who was a mortgagee in possession of the estate, and had the conduct of the sale, bid against the purchaser, and enhanced the price, so that Mr. Baxter, the only other bidder, having ceased bidding at £14,000, all the other biddings were between Mr. Dimmock and the purchaser, up to £19,000.

If these admitted facts formed the whole of the case, there would not, I think, be any room for doubt; for, if an auctioneer says that a sale is without reserve, every one must understand from that statement that no bidding is to be made on behalf of persons interested in the estate, and the purchaser would be just as much entitled to be discharged as if the conditions had stated the sale to be without reserve.

It is alleged, however, on behalf of the parties to the suit, that though the auctioneer did state that the sale was without reserve, he at the same time stated that the parties interested in the estate had liberty to bid. This is met on the part of the purchaser, not by a denial of the auctioneer having made the latter statement, but by a denial of the purchaser having heard it. The evidence before us establishes that the auctioneer did make the statement, several witnesses who were present at the sale having heard him make it, and without intending to impute to the purchaser any wilful misstatement, I am of opinion that we cannot judicially do otherwise than treat him as having heard and known that the parties interested in the estate had liberty to bid. The question then remains, what meaning is to be attributed to the statement that a sale is without reserve, but that the parties interested are at liberty to bid. The two branches of the statement are not very consistent, but I think that they may be read together by taking the second as a qualification of the first; and if a purchaser knows that parties interested have liberty to bid, he cannot be entitled to be discharged on the ground that they have bid against him.

The purchaser further grounds his case on misrepresentations in the particulars. Some of the instances alleged appear to me to be unimportant. Thus I think that a mere general statement that land is fertile and improvable, whereas part of it has been abandoned as useless, cannot, except in extreme cases—as, for instance, where a considerable part is covered with water, or otherwise irreclaimable—be considered such a misrepresentation as to entitle a purchaser to be discharged. In the present case, I think the statement is to be looked at as a mere flourishing description by an auctioneer.

The next misrepresentation alleged is as to the warping. If the conditions had stated that the land could be covered with deposit within a limited time, and it appeared clearly that it could not be covered within that time, or if it had been stated that the process could be performed at a certain expense, and it was shewn that it could not be performed except at a much greater cost, the purchaser might probably have been entitled to the relief he seeks. But such a vague statement as that the land “in course of time may be covered with warp, and considerably improved at a moderate cost,” puts a purchaser on inquiry, and if he chooses to buy on the faith of such a statement without inquiry, he has no ground of complaint.

The next alleged misrepresentation is much more important. A farm called Bull Hassocks, containing 300 acres, or nearly a third of the property put up for sale, is described as “lately in the occupation of Mr. R. Hickson, at an annual rent of £290 15s. Now in hand.” The facts are, that this farm had been let at a higher rent than £290 15s. before Hickson became tenant Hickson took the farm at Midsummer, 1863, at the rent of £290 15s. At Michaelmas, 1864, he left it, and there appears never to have been any actual tenancy between his leaving and the time of the sale. Mr. Dimmock, however, being in possession, agreed with a Mr. Nelson to let him Bull Hassocks Farm, and another farm called Creyke's Hundreds, containing 115 acres, at 15s. per acre, which would bring the rent of Bull Hassocks Farm to £225 at most. That agreement was not carried into effect, for Nelson desired to be relieved of the farm, and paid £20 to be off his bargain. Was it then fair and honest to describe the farm in the particulars as late in the occupation of Hickson at a rent of £290 15s., when Hickson had been out of possession nearly a year and a half, within which period there had been an agreement to let the farm at a rent less by £65 than that paid by him. Such a description amounts to a representation to the purchaser that he will come into possession of a farm which will let for £290 15s., whereas Mr. Dimmock, who had agreed to let it for so much less, knew that nothing near that rent could be obtained for it. But the matter does not rest there, for even the representation that the farm had been let to Hickson at £290 15s. was not correct. He had occupied it for a year and a quarter, paying only £1 for the first quarter; and this took place at a time of year when the occupation must have been beneficial; for the farm contained about 150 acres of pasture, which Hickson thus held at a nominal rent from Midsummer to Michaelmas. I am of opinion, therefore, that the particulars contain representations which were untrue, and calculated materially to increase the apparent value of the property. The Court requires good faith in conditions of sale, and looks strictly at the statements contained in them.

Again, Creyke's Hundreds, containing 115 acres, is described as let to R. Hickson, a yearly Lady Day tenant, at £130 per annum; and another farm, Misson Springs, containing 131 acres, is mentioned as let to Wigglesworth, a yearly Lady Day tenant, at £160 per annum. Now the sale took place on the 25th of January, 1866, and there is no reference made in the particulars to the fact that each of these tenants had given a notice to quit, which would expire at Lady Day. The purchaser, therefore, would be led to suppose, as to these farms, that he was purchasing with continuing tenancies at fixed rents, whereas he would, in fact, have to find tenants immediately after the completion of his purchase. I refer particularly to this, because as to some of the other farms it is stated in the particulars that the tenants had given notice to quit; so that the purchaser must have been led to believe that the tenants of Creyke's Hundreds and Misson Springs were continuing tenants. This again, as it seems to me, is a material misrepresentation.

The vendor contends that these are only errors, entitling the purchaser to compensation under the thirteenth condition of sale. I think that such a condition applies to accidental slips, but not to a case like the present, where, though I do not mean to impute actual fraud, there is what, in the view of a Court of Equity, amounts to fraud — a misrepresentation calculated materially to mislead a purchaser.

I am of opinion, therefore, that the Petitioner is entitled to be discharged; but there has been so much negligence on his part that he ought not, I think, to have any costs.

Sir HM Cairns LJ:

I am of the same opinion. The case raises questions of considerable importance, and, in my view, the Court ought not to be less strict as to sales under its own order than as to sales out of Court. It is first contended by the Petitioner that the sale is vitiated by Dimmock having bid at it. That argument depends upon the conclusion at which we arrive as to what took place at the sale, for the purchaser does not rest his case on the conditions, but on a statement made by the auctioneer; it is, therefore, incumbent on the Court to ascertain what did take place, and the whole of what took place, for it is not alleged that the purchaser was absent during part of the sale. I cannot but come judicially to the conclusion upon the evidence that the auctioneer repeatedly stated, not only that the sale was without reserve, but that all the parties were at liberty to bid. It remains to consider what that statement means. It appears to me to amount to this — that all parties were at liberty to bid, but that every bidding, if accepted, would make a contract. I think, therefore, that the purchaser is not entitled to be discharged on the ground of Mr. Dimmock having bid against him.

As regards the case of misrepresentation, I attach no importance to the statement as to the results of the estate being within the South Level. It was calculated to put a purchaser on his guard, and is a statement which certainly would not have made me very sanguine that the estate could be dealt with under the powers relating to the Level either very speedily or very cheaply. What is a “moderate” cost is a question which different people would answer very differently; and a statement that the cost will be moderate is too indefinite to amount to a misrepresentation. Then as to the omission to state that Hickson and Wigglesworth had given notice to quit, it is to be observed that the particulars, as regards the other holdings, stated that the tenants of them had given notice; it was, therefore, a fair inference that, when there was no such statement, the tenant had not given notice. The farms held by Hickson and Wigglesworth are important as regards size, and the purchaser would consider himself safe of his rent from these till Lady Day, 1867. The point is of importance to him, for if the tenants leave he must either find new tenants, or make allowances to the outgoing tenants. I think, therefore, that the omission is very material. I do not arrive at the conclusion that it was wilful. I believe the affidavit which states that it was accidental; and if it stood alone, it probably would only be a matter for compensation.

But as to Bull Hassocks Farm, why was it stated that this farm was late in the occupation of R. Hickson, at a rent of £290 15s.? Evidently this was put forward as a test of the value of the farm, and the particulars must be taken to say that it was a fair test. Is it a fair test? and can the vendor really have thought that it was so? As far as we can ascertain the facts, this farm was once occupied by a person named Robinson; there was an interval between Robinson and the next tenant Simpson; then another interval between Simpson and Hickson. Simpson paid more rent than Hickson; it was a falling property, and the vendor, if he gave any standard, was bound to give a fair one. Moreover, could it be said that Hickson did occupy at that rent? He held the farm from Midsummer, 1863, to the next Michaelmas, for £1; a farm containing 150 acres of pasture land, the occupation of which, for that quarter, was clearly valuable. He had the power of determining his tenancy at Michaelmas, 1864, which he exercised; so, in fact, he held the land fifteen months for £291 15s. But the matter does not rest there. When Hickson gave up the farm, the Plaintiff sought to obtain a tenant, and made a verbal arrangement with Nelson to come in at a rent of £225. The Plaintiff, being a mortgagee in possession, was bound to obtain the best rent; it must, therefore, be taken that £225 was the best rent that could be obtained. He found that Nelson was not a man of capital, and he agreed, for a consideration, to rescind the arrangement; but this does not affect the question as to the rent. One of the Plaintiff's own witnesses can go no further than to say that he would give 16s. an acre for it. The statement as to the rent was calculated to mislead, and was not prepared with the good faith which is requisite in conditions of sale. I think that a misrepresentation of this nature affects the validity of the contract, and is not a matter for compensation, but entitles the Petitioner to be discharged. I agree as to the costs.

== See also ==
- Misrepresentation in English law
