= Stevenson, Jordan & Harrison Ltd v MacDonald & Evans =

UK legal case

- Court: Court of Appeal
- Citation: [1952] 1 TLR 101

Keywords
- Employee

Stevenson, Jordan & Harrison Ltd v MacDonald & Evans [1952] 1 TLR 101 is a UK labour law case, concerning the right of employees to intellectual property in the work they produce.

== Facts ==
A management engineer wrote a book using information he gained while working for his firm, first as an employee, and then an executive officer. Some was from the text of lectures that he wrote and delivered, and some was material he acquired while on an assignment. He died before publication. The Copyright Act 1911 section 5(1) said that the author of a work is the first owner of a copyright. But if the author was under a contract of employment and the work was in the course of employment the employer would own the copyright in absence of another agreement. His old firm claimed the copyright.

== Judgment ==
Denning LJ held the engineer simply put together his know how of the profession and had not betrayed any mystery of the firm's business or disclosed trade secrets. His contract was mixed, partly of and partly for services outside the contract. His lecture work was not covered by the Act, but the material acquired while on assignment did fall within the Act. The publishers should be restrained from printing that section, which was severable.

Denning LJ said the following in his judgment.

I fully agree with all that my Lord has said on all the issues in this case. It raises the troublesome question of the distinction between a contract of service and a contract for services. The test usually applied is whether the employer has the right to control the manner of doing the work. Thus in Collins v Herts County Council, Mr. Justice Hilbery said:

The distinction between a contract for services and a contract of service can be summarized in this way: In the one case the master can order or require what is to be done, while in the other case he can not only order or require what is to be done but how it shall be done.

[...]

It is often easy to recognise a contract of service when you see it, but difficult to say where the difference lies. A ship’s master, a chauffeur, and a reporter on the staff of a newspaper are all employed under a contract of service; but a ship’s pilot, a taxi-man, and a newspaper contributor are employed under a contract for services. One feature which seems to me to run through the instances is that, under a contract of service, a man is employed as part of the business and his work is done as an integral part of the business; whereas under a contract for services his work, although done for the business, is not integrated into it but is only accessory to it.

Mawmen v Teg was distinguished, Waites v Franco-British Exhibition was applied, Cassidy v Ministry of Health was applied and Byrne v Statist Co was applied.

== See also ==
- UK labour law
