= Overbrooke Estates Ltd v Glencombe Properties Ltd =

- Court: High Court, Chancery Division

Case opinions
- Brightman J

Keywords
- Misrepresentation, exclusion clause

Overbrooke Estates Ltd v Glencombe Properties Ltd [1974] 3 All ER 511 is an English contract law case, concerning misrepresentation.

== Facts ==
Glencombe Properties bid for Overbrooke's property at an auction in the Cumberland Hotel, Marble Arch. The property was 63 Hertford Road, Islington. Conditions R(b) of the sale said,

‘The vendors do not make or give and neither the Auctioneers nor any person in the employment of the Auctioneers has any authority to make or give any representation or warranty in relation to these premises.’

The auctioneers, Wilmotts, represented to Glencombe that the local council had no plans for the property and were not interested in compulsory purchase. After Glencombe made a successful bid, the council told Glencombe the property would be purchased in its slum clearance programme. So Glencombe refused to pay Overbrooke. Overbrooke sought specific performance. It was contended that any liability for misrepresentation had been validly excluded under s 3 of the Misrepresentation Act 1967.

== Judgment ==
Brightman J held that Overbrooke Estates Ltd were not responsible and could get specific performance. Condition R(b) was effective - not to exclude liability, but to define their duty so that responsibility for the auctioneer's negligent statements was never assumed. The condition meant that no ostensible authority had been given to the auctioneers as agents to make representations on Overbrooke's behalf. Therefore, s 3 MA 1967 did not apply.

== See also ==
- English contract law
- Misrepresentation in English law
