= Cullinane v McGuigan =

- Court: Court of Appeal of New Zealand
- Full case name: RODNEY BERNARD CULLINANE and Mary Cullinane Appellants v Kevin Bernard McGuigan
- Decided: 29 September 1999
- Transcript: Court of Appeal judgment

Court membership
- Judges sitting: Thomas, Gallen, Doogue

Cullinane v McGuigan is a cited case in New Zealand regarding the requirement under section 7(4)(b) of the Contractual Remedies Act 1979 that a breach of contract must be "substantial" for a contract to be cancelled, and that "substantial" was not limited to a comparison of monetary values.

== Background ==
The Cullinanes in 1995 auctioned their unfinished Christchurch house, that due to matrimonial problems, had remained an unfinished shell since 1991.

On the day of the auction, McGuigan was the winning bidder at the auction for $370,000.

Later, after the Auction and before settlement McGuigan checked the propertys Council records and found that there were several uninspected building features which were of concern including defects in the construction and exterior cladding that needed to be rectified and council approved so he canceled the contract and sought the refund of his $37,000 deposit.

The Cullinanes claimed it was not a substantial breach to justify the cancelling of the sale contract, adding that the argument was immaterial anyway, as they claimed one of the letters by McGuigan's solicitors discussing settlement amounted to affirmation.

"We enclose copy of letter from the City Council dated 20 November 1995 containing many requisitions which were not brought to the attention of Mr and Mrs McGuigan by your clients. There was a letter of 21 November 1995 from Lovell-Smith & Cusiel Limited (copy enclosed) which was circulated at the auction, but does not satisfy the matters referred to in the Council's letter of 20 November. Further, we enclose a Council Memorandum dated 27 November which rejects the letter from Lovell-Smith & Cusiel Limited.

A recent check by Mr McGuigan of the Council's records show that there is no record of previous inspections in regard to foundations or framing. Mr Cullinane has advised Mr McGuigan that inspections have taken place, but the owners copy of plans with inspections notices thereon is apparently with Mr Cullinane's builder, Mr Craig Milner, who cannot be located.

Settlement is set down for 31 March 1996, and we advise that our clients will not be prepared to settle unless all the requisitions noted in the Council's letter have been satisfied. We also require confirmation that all required inspections at foundation and framing stages have taken place to the satisfaction of the Council."

— Judgement of the Court of Appeal of New Zealand, 29 September 1999

In the District Court, it was ruled the solicitors letter amounted to affirmation of the contract. However, on appeal, the High Court ruled that the contents of the letter could have been interpreted in numerous ways, setting aside the affirmation ruling, and instead ruling that the defects involved were substantial in nature, and that McGuigan was entitled to cancel the contract, and was duly awarded a refund of his deposit.

The Cullianes appealed.

== Held ==
The court dismissed the appeal.

== See also ==
- Pearson v Wynn
