= Wakelin v R H & E A Jackson Ltd =

1984 New Zealand court case

- Court: High Court of New Zealand
- Full case name: Kevin & Patricia Wakelin v R H & E A Jackson Limited, Barfoot & Thompson Limited, Robert Hedley & Eunice Alice Jackson, James S. Lambert
- Decided: 22 November 1983
- Citation: (1984) 2 NZCPR 195
- Transcript: High Court judgment

Court membership
- Judge sitting: Henry J

Keywords
- misstatement, opinion

Wakelin v R H & E A Jackson LTD (1984) 2 NZCPR 195 is an often cited case of the High Court of New Zealand regarding misstatements. The judgement ruled that merely being silent on an important fact can be construed as a misstatement in itself.

== Background ==
R H & E A Jackson Ltd were selling their lunch bar "Crumbs" and employed the real estate agency Barfoot and Thompson to sell it. The real estate agent, Mr Lambert arranged a sale to the Wakelin's for $130,000. About a week after settlement, signs went up nearby advertising that the Hasty Tasty takeaway bar was about to open a few doors down. As a result of this new competition, the plaintiff suffered a decrease in turnover leading to them selling the business the following year for only $67,000.

Unhappy with their purchase, claimed the defendant’s agents made 6 misstatements, with the most contentious of all that they were told that the nearest takeaway bar was half a mile away, that while literally true, the agent knew that another takeaway bar, the Hasty Tasty, was due to open soon only a few doors down. The agent also made the statement that turnover of lunch bar would be $1,000 per week if deep fryer was installed.

The Wakelin's sued the vendor, the vendors shareholders personal, the real estate agency and the real estate agent personally as well for misrepresentation under the Contractual Remedies Act 1979.

== Decision ==
The court ruled that failing to mention the imminent opening of a nearby lunch bar was a misrepresentation, and that the vendor only was liable for damages, as agents cannot be sued under the Contractual Remedies Act 1979 as they are not a party to the original contract, although the judge said an agent can still be sued under the tort of negligence. The court however struck out the claim regarding the statement of installing the deep fryer, as the judge ruled that this was merely a statement of opinion. The plaintiff was awarded damages of $21,000.
