= Edgington v Fitzmaurice =

Edgington v Fitzmaurice (1885) 29 Ch D 459 is an English contract law case, concerning misrepresentation. It holds that a statement of present intentions can count as an actionable misrepresentation and that a misrepresentation need not be the sole cause of entering a contract so long as it is an influence.

== Facts ==
Company directors sent shareholders a prospectus inviting subscriptions for debenture bonds. It said money would go to alter their buildings, buy horses, vans and expand into supplying fish. Really though, the purpose was to pay off liabilities, because the company was in trouble. Mistakenly believing he would get a first charge on company property, Mr Edgington bought bonds. If he was aware that he wouldn't get a charge, he wouldn't have done so. Mr Edgington sought to recover money for deceit.

== Judgment ==
The Court of Appeal upheld Denman J at first instance, saying that the directors were liable for deceit. Cotton LJ held that the statement of purpose was a fraudulent misrepresentation and Mr Edgington had relied on that despite his admission of mistake over charges. He said,

It is true that if he had not supposed he would have a charge he would not have taken the debentures; but if he also relied on the misstatement in the prospectus, his loss nonetheless resulted from that misstatement. It is not necessary to show that the misstatement was the sole cause of his acting as he did. If he acted on that misstatement, though he was also influenced by an erroneous supposition, the defendants will still be liable... It was a statement of intention, but it is nevertheless a statement of fact, and if it could not be fairly said that the objects of the issue of the debentures were those which were stated in the prospectus the Defendants were stating a fact which was not true...

To fulfil the requirement that Mr Edgington relied on the statement, it is not necessary to show the misstatement was the sole cause of acting, so long as there was an influence.

Bowen LJ said ‘the state of a man’s mind is as much a fact as the state of his digestion... A misrepresentation as to the state of a man’s mind is, therefore, a misstatement of fact... such misstatement was material if it was actively present to his mind when he decided to advance his money.’

Fry LJ said the ‘inquiry is whether this statement materially affected the conduct of the Plaintiff in advancing his money.’ He pointed out the ‘prospectus was intended to influence the mind of the reader.’

== See also ==
- English contract law
- Misrepresentation in English law
