= Brown v Langwoods Photo Stores Ltd =

- Court: Court of Appeal of New Zealand
- Full case name: James Owen Brown and Linda Margaret Brown v Langwoods Photo Stores Limited
- Decided: 17 September 1990
- Citation: [1991] 1 NZLR 173
- Transcript: Court of Appeal judgment

Court membership
- Judges sitting: Cooke P, Casey J, Williamson J

Brown v Langwoods Photo Stores Ltd [1991] 1 NZLR 173 is a cited case in New Zealand regarding the consequences of cancellation of a contract under the Contractual Remedies Act 1979.

== Background ==
The Browns ran photo shops in Whakatāne and Hāwera under a Langwoods franchise. Unhappy with how Langwoods was spending its 2.5% national marketing levy, they referred the matter to arbitration, where the arbitrator ruled that Langwoods were in breach of the franchise agreement, and ordered them to refund $18,000 of the marketing levy to them.

The Browns subsequently cancelled their franchises, and sued Langwoods for $21,668.77 for the unpaid arbitrators award (including interest).

Langwoods countersued for the unpaid franchise fees of $21,433.55, which Browns refused to pay claiming it was barred under section 8(3)(a).

The Brown sought to speed up the process by having the Langwood counterclaim struck out, and were unsuccessful in the High Court, and then appealed to the Court of Appeal.

== Held ==
The court ruled that Langwoods claim for the franchise fees was not barred by section 8(3)(a), as the fees in question had already accrued by the time of the cancellation of the franchise agreement, and accordingly refused to strike out the Langwood counterclaim.
