= Pearson v Wynn =

- Court: High Court of New Zealand
- Full case name: Pearson v Wynn
- Decided: 6 May 1986
- Citation: (1986) 2 NZCPR 449

Court membership
- Judge sitting: Wlliamson J

Pearson v Wynn (1986) 2 NZCPR 449 is a cited case in New Zealand regarding the requirement under section 7(4)(b) of the Contractual Remedies Act 1970 that a breach of contract must be "substantial" for a contract to be cancelled.

== Background ==
Pearson sold to Wynn his horticultural land for $159,000.

Prior to the sale, Pearson had misrepresented that the land was fully irrigated, when in fact that the irrigation system need a further $9,500 to $10,000 spent on it.

When this came to the notice of Wynn, he cancelled the contract.

Pearson sued to have the contract honoured.

== Held ==
The court held that whilst the $9,500 - $10,000 in costs were not substantial in itself, that the inconvenience of the work that was entailed, met the standard required under either s 7 (4)(b)(I) or s7(4)(b)(ii). Williamson J stated "Matters in relation to this term not necessarily relate only to value or money, but may also involve features which confer a benefit or cast a burden of some substantive on a party".
