= Mayall v Ward =

- Court: High Court of New Zealand
- Full case name: Mayall v Ward
- Decided: 27 October 1982
- Citation: [1982] 2 NZLR 385

Court membership
- Judge sitting: Pritchard J

Mayall v Ward [1982] 2 NZLR 385 is a cited case regarding relief under the Contractual Remedies Act 1979.
