= Bird v Bicknell =

- Court: High Court of New Zealand
- Full case name: David Bird and Denise Beatrix Bird v Janice Bicknell, Dominic Faanoi, Dennise Faanoi, Ceedric Rodrigues and Robert Martin
- Decided: 23 September 1987
- Citation: [1987] 2 NZLR 542
- Transcript: http://www.nzlii.org/nz/cases/NZHC/1987/277.pdf

Court membership
- Judge sitting: Hillyer J

Bird v Bicknell [1987] 2 NZLR 542 is a cited case in New Zealand regarding fraud merely being a factor (albeit an important factor) in determining whether an exclusion clause is valid or not. It is contrasted with M E Torbett Ltd v Keirlor Motels Ltd where is held that an exclusion clause is simply not valid where a party has committed fraud.

== Background ==
Bird was in the business of selling franchises regarding a chemical process, which they told Bicknell was secret only to them, and that a patent application was pending. These claims were later discovered to be fraudulent, and Bicknell refused to make the final payment on his franchise. Bird pointed out the contract had a clause agreeing to no warranties were given about the patent.

Bird sued Bicknell.

== Held ==
The court found that the exclusion clause was not "fair and reasonable".
