= Pendergrast v Chapman =

- Court: High Court of New Zealand
- Full case name: Graeme Ross Pendergrast v Paul Percy Chapman
- Decided: 8 December 1987
- Citation: [1988] 2 NZLR 177
- Transcript: High Court judgment

Court membership
- Judge sitting: Wylie J

Pendergrast v Chapman [1988] 2 NZLR 177 is a cited case in New Zealand regarding the consequences of cancellation of a contract under the Contractual Remedies Act 1979.

== Background ==
Chapman agreed to purchase the Pendergrast's Epsom property for NZ$650,000, NZ$40,000 of the deposit to be paid via a post-dated cheque.

The post dated cheque later dishonoured, and as a result, Pendergrast cancelled the contract and sued Chapman for the NZ$40,000 unpaid deposit. Chapman defended the claim that under the section 8(3) of the Contractual Remedies Act, once a contract is cancelled, neither party is obliged to perform the contract any further.

== Held ==
The court ruled that the Act only stopped future obligations, not obligations that had already fallen due, such as the deposit here. Chapman was ruled liable to pay the deposit.
