= Jackson v McClintock =

- Court: High Court of New Zealand
- Full case name: Jackson v McLintock
- Citation: (1998) 8 TCLR 161

Court membership
- Judge sitting: Laurenson J

Jackson v McClintock (1998) 8 TCLR 161 is a cited case in New Zealand regarding relief under the Contractual Remedies Act 1979.
