= Falcke v Scottish Imperial Insurance Co =

- Court: Court of Appeal
- Citation: (1886) 34 Ch 234

Court membership
- Judges sitting: Bowen LJ, Fry LJ

Falcke v Scottish Imperial Insurance Co (1886) 34 Ch 234 is an English unjust enrichment law case, which also concerns English contract law. It sets out some fundamental principles of construction of obligations, as viewed to exist by the late 19th-century English judiciary.

== Facts ==
Falcke owned the first mortgage on the life insurance policy of the Duchess de Beaufremont. There were many mortgages on it. Emmanuel paid a large premium on the policy to preserve its value because he mistakenly thought he was the ultimate owner of the equity, or he bought out the interests in the policy that were in priority to his. He claimed he should have a lien on the policy for the premium he just paid, because otherwise the whole life insurance policy would have lapsed.

== Judgment ==
Bowen LJ held that Emmanuel could get no lien on the basis of his mistake, or his saving the policy. Falcke did not request it, know about it, or acquiesce in the payment. So the entire value of the policy belonged to Falcke.

The general principle is, beyond all question, that work and labour done or money expended by one man to preserve or benefit the property of another do not according to English law create any lien upon the property saved or benefited, nor, even if standing alone, create any obligation to repay the expenditure. Liabilities are not to be forced upon people behind their backs any more than you can confer a benefit upon a man against his will.

There is an exception to this proposition in the maritime law. I mention it because the word “salvage” has been used from time to time throughout the argument, and some analogy is sought to be established between salvage and the right claimed by the Respondents. With regard to salvage, general average, and contribution, the maritime law differs from the common law. That has been so from the time of the Roman law downwards. The maritime law, for the purposes of public policy and for the advantage of trade, imposes in these cases a liability upon the thing saved, a liability which is a special consequence arising out of the character of mercantile enterprises, the nature of sea perils, and the fact that the thing saved was saved under great stress and exceptional circumstances. No similar doctrine applies to things lost upon land, nor to anything except ships or goods in peril at sea.

With regard to ordinary goods upon which labour or money is expended with a view of saving them or benefiting the owner, there can, as it seems to me, according to the common law be only one principle upon which a claim for repayment can be based, and that is where you can find facts from which the law will imply a contract to repay or to give a lien. It is perfectly true that the inference of an understanding between the parties—which you may translate into other language by calling it an implied contract—is an inference which will unhesitatingly be drawn in cases where the circumstances plainly lead to the conclusion that the owner of the saved property knew that the other party was laying out his money in the expectation of being repaid. In other words, you must have circumstances from which the proper inference is that there was a request to perform the service. It comes to the same thing, but I abstain the using the word “request” more than is necessary, for fear of plunging myself into all the archaic embarrassments connected with the cases about requests. But wherever you find that the owner of the property saved knew of the service being performed, you will have to ask yourself (and the question will become one of fact) whether under all the circumstances there was either what the law calls an implied contract for repayment or a contract which would give rise to a lien?

Fry LJ concurred.

== See also ==
- English unjust enrichment law
