= Newmans Tours Ltd v Ranier Investments Ltd =

- Court: Court of Appeal of New Zealand
- Full case name: Newmans Tours Ltd v Ranier Investments Ltd
- Citation: [1992] 2 NZLR 68; aff'd sub nom

Newmans Tours Ltd v Ranier Investments Ltd [1992] 2 NZLR 68; aff'd sub nom is a cited case in New Zealand regarding relief under the Contractual Remedies Act 1979 where a contract is repudiated by one of the parties.
