= Simanke v Liu =

High Court case regarding New Zealand contract law

- Court: High Court of New Zealand
- Full case name: Simanke v Liu
- Citation: (1994) 2 NZ ConvC 191,888

Court membership
- Judge sitting: Henry J

Simanke v Liu (1994) 2 NZ ConvC 191,888 is a cited case in New Zealand regarding cancellation of a contract under the Contractual Remedies Act. It held that any deposit in excess of a customary deposit, in this case 10%, is refundable to the purchaser.

== Background ==
Simanke agreed to sell a property to Liu for $650,000, with the sales agreement stating that a deposit of $300,000 was to be paid within 14 days.

The contract was later cancelled, and Siminake sued for the $300,000 deposit. Liu defended the claim by saying as under the Contractual Remedies Act 1979, once a contract is cancelled, no party is obliged to perform any further on a contract. Simanke argued that the Act still requires the deposit to be paid.

== Held ==
The court ruled that in New Zealand, the customary deposit is 10%, meaning in this case, $300,000 was not in the nature of a deposit, and so was not enforceable here. Furthermore, Simanke's claim was not helped either by the fact that the sales agreement had limited the forfeiture of deposit to be only 10%, anyway. Simanke's claim was dismissed.
