= New Zealand Tenancy Bonds Ltd v Mooney =

- Court: Court of Appeal of New Zealand, Wellington
- Decided: 12 December 1985
- Citation: [1986] 1 NZLR 280

Court membership
- Judges sitting: Woodhouse P, Richardson J, McCarthy J

New Zealand Tenancy Bonds Ltd v Mooney [1986] 1 NZLR 280 is an often cited case regarding misrepresentation and whether the misrepresentation was "essential" in order for a party to be able to cancel the contract under the Contractual Remedies Act 1979.

== Background ==
New Zealand Tenancy Bonds made an unconditional offer to purchase Mooney's Christchurch property which was accepted the same day. The sale agreement specified that the deposit was to be paid "immediately on acceptance of this offer". The sale agreement also stated that the payment of the deposit was "strictly of the essence of the contract".

However, the purchaser waited 53 days before paying the deposit. The vendor, not happy with the delay, cancelled the contract, and refused to continue with the sale to the purchaser.

== Decision ==
The court ruled that as the time for the payment of the deposit was an essential term of the contract, and as this term was not complied with, the vendor was entitled to cancel the sale agreement under the Contractual Remedies Act [1979].

Richardson J stated: "non-payment in the circumstances of the case constituted a fundamental breach entitling the vendor to cancel the contract in terms of s 7(3) and (4) of the Contractual Remedies Act 1979."
