= Gallagher v Young =

1981 High Court of New Zealand case

- Court: High Court of New Zealand
- Full case name: Rex Thomas Gallagher & Ruth Lillian Gallagher v Peter Young & Susan Young
- Decided: 4 August 1981
- Citation: [1981] 1 NZLR 734
- Transcript: High Court judgment

Court membership
- Judge sitting: Greig J

Gallagher v Young [1981] 1 NZLR 734 is a cited case in New Zealand regarding relief under the Contractual Remedies Act 1979 where a contract is repudiated by one of the parties.

== Background ==
In the 1976, the Youngs purchased a run down house in Hamilton, and over the next several years, they renovated the property.

In 1980, they sold the house for $44,000 to the Gallaghers, and in the sale agreement, the Youngs stipulated that they were unaware of an council building code issues.'

However, the day following their moving into the house, the Gallaghers were not only visited by a council building inspector, but also an inspector from the local power authority. Combined, both inspectors discovered 23 breaches of the regulation's, some the vendors were aware of, and some they were not.

The biggest defect was the washing machine, which was outside in the open, without proper wiring or proper waste disposal, followed by an improperly built deck, all of which the Youngs were well aware of at the time of sale.

Upon discovery of all this, the Gallaghers moved into a motel, cancelled the contract, and demanded the Youngs to refund the purchase price.

== Held ==
As these matters would require substantial expenditure to fix, the judge ruled that the Youngs must refund the purchase price under section 7(4)(b).
