= Burch v Willoughby Consultants Ltd =

New Zealand court case

- Court: High Court of New Zealand
- Full case name: Robert Thompson Burch v Willoughby Consultants Limited (First Defendant), Malcolm James Willoughby (Second Defendant)
- Decided: 21 July 1989
- Citation: (1990) 3 NZELC 97,582
- Transcript: High Court Judgment

Court membership
- Judge sitting: Jeffries J

Burch v Willoughby Consultants Ltd (1990) 3 NZELC 97,582 is a cited case in New Zealand regarding the remedy of damages for mental distress under the Contractual Remedies Act (1979) for breach of contract.

== Background ==
Robert Burch was a chartered accountant nearing the retirement age of 65. Unhappy at the prospect of facing his final years before retiring working for an accountancy firm, he accepted an offer of employment in 1982 by one of his clients, Willoughby Consultants Ltd.

The employment contract guaranteed Burch employment until his 65th birthday, plus 1,000 shares in the company.

However, just over two years later, A C Nielson purchased the company, and did not want to employ someone aged in their sixties. As a result, the following day of the sale, Willoughby Consultants informed Burch that they were terminating his employment, with three months' notice.

== Case ==
After working out his notice, he sued Willoughby Consultants for the loss of benefits that he would have attained had his employment continued until he turned 65. He also sued for damages under the Contractual Remedies Act (1979).

Willoughby Consultants claimed they were entitled to terminate his employment, alleging he was involved in a dishonest transaction at work and that he sexually harassed some of his fellow female employees, although Willoughby Consultants only first mentioned these matters after the court action had commenced.

The judge did not find any evidence to support Willoughby Consultants claim of misconduct, and in fact none of their witnesses they called were able to cite even one incident to support these claims. Accordingly, Willoughby was awarded damages of $100,000 for the loss of benefits he would have attained had he been employed the 3 years and 199 days until he turned 65. The judge also awarded $10,000 in damages under section 9 of the Contractual Remedies Act (1979).
