= Bisset v Wilkinson =

1927 New Zealand contract law case

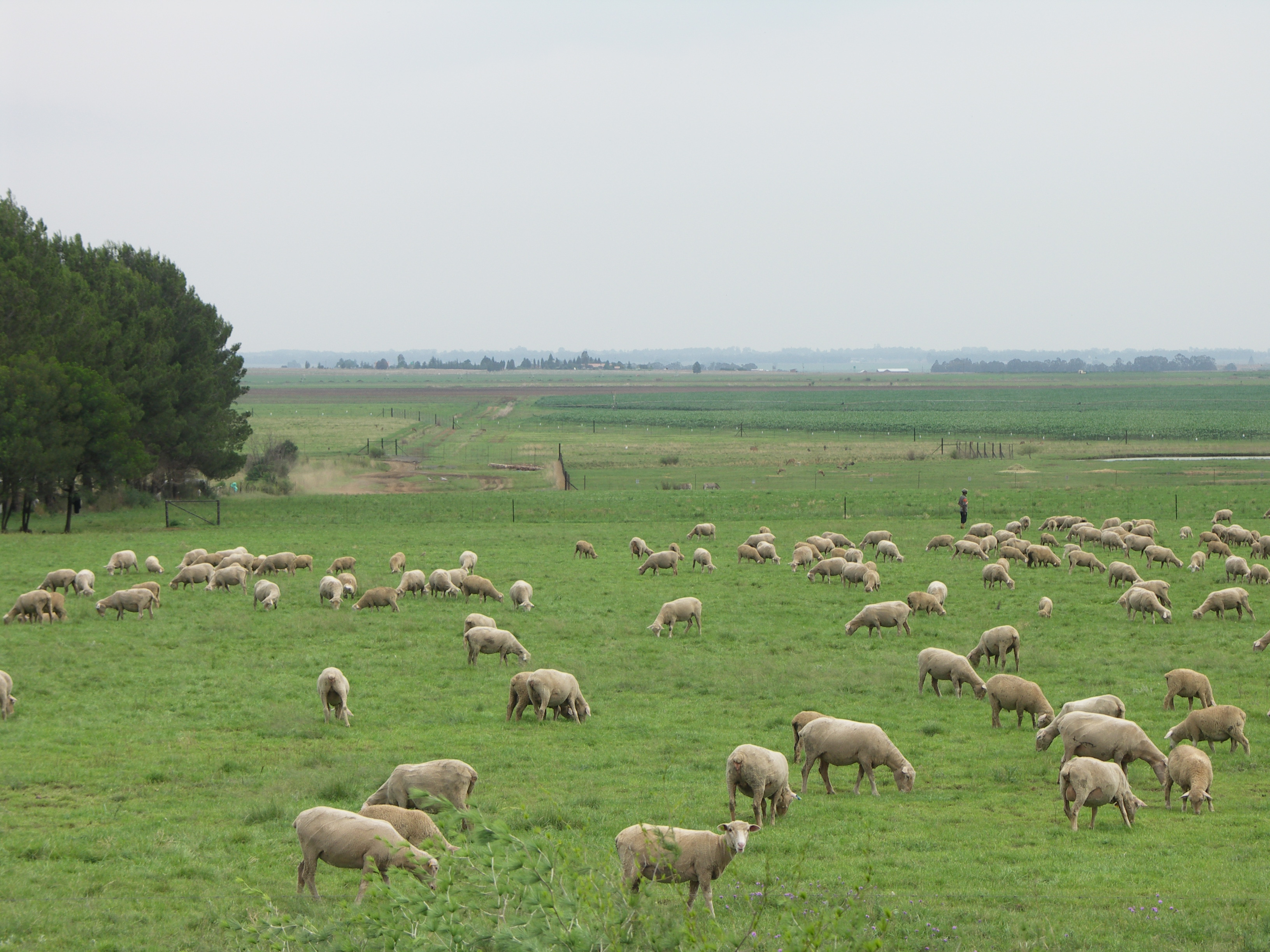
- Court: Privy Council
- Full case name: Robert Hugh Bisset v Thomas Vernon Wilkinson
- Decided: 20 July 1926
- Citation: [1927] AC 17
- Transcript: PC ruling

Court membership
- Judges sitting: Viscount Dunedin, Lord Atkinson, Lord Carson, Lord Merrivale

Keywords
- Misrepresentation, opinion

Bisset v Wilkinson [1927] AC 177 is a leading contract law case from New Zealand on the issue of misrepresentation. The case establishes that a mere misstatement of opinion given fairly cannot amount to a misrepresentation.

The case was heard in London by the Privy Council, which was then the final appeal court for New Zealand. As such, the decision, although "very strongly persuasive" on English contract law, is not conclusively binding. Nevertheless, the case has been cited and applied in England and Wales several times.

== Facts ==
In New Zealand in May 1919 Mr Bisset entered into a binding contract to sell to Mr Wilkinson two contiguous blocks of farmland for £13,260. These blocks comprised 834 and 141 hectares (2,062 and 348 acres) respectively. During negotiations Bisset told Wilkinson that "with a good six horse team, his idea was that the farm would carry 2,000 sheep". After 2 years of unsuccessful farming, Wilkison concluded that the land could not support 2,000 sheep, and he brought an action for misrepresentation to cancel the contract and get his money back.

== Advice ==
The Privy Council advised that the statements about the farmland could not amount a serious representation based on Bisset's knowledge. At the time of the deal, both parties understood that Bisset had not used the land for sheep farming, and thus any statement as to the farmland's capacity would only be an estimate.

Giving the leading judgment, Lord Merrivale stated that important considerations were the 'material facts of the transaction, the knowledge of the respective parties and their relative positions, the words of representation used, and the actual condition of the subject-matter spoken of …’. The judge added:

In ascertaining what meaning was conveyed to the minds of the now respondents by the appellant's statement as to the two thousand sheep, the most material fact to be remembered is that, as both parties were aware, the appellant had not and, so far as appears, no other person had at any time carried on sheep-farming upon the unit of land in question. That land as a distinct holding had never constituted a sheep-farm.

In addition, Lord Merrivale noted that Wilkinson had "failed to prove that the farm (if properly managed) was incapable of being occupied by two thousand sheep".

Viscount Dunedin, Lord Atkinson, Lord Phillimore and Lord Carson agreed.

== Significance ==
The case clarifies that a misstatement of "fact" may be a misrepresentation, but misstatements of opinion, intention or law are not. By contrast, in situations where one party has specialist knowledge of the subject (so that his "opinion" is one which is effectively a "statement of fact") then the misstatement becomes an actionable misrepresentation, as in Esso Petroleum Co Ltd v Mardon, and in Smith v Land & House Property Corp.

== See also ==
- Smith v Land & House Property Corp
- Esso Petroleum Co Ltd v Mardon
- Misrepresentation in English law
- English contract law
