= Hansen v Boocock =

- Court: High Court of New Zealand
- Full case name: Hansen v Boocock
- Decided: 13 June 1991

Court membership
- Judge sitting: Wylie J

Hansen v Boocock is a cited New Zealand case regarding cancellation of contracts under the Contractual Remedies Act 1979.
