= Worsdale v Polglase =

- Court: High Court of New Zealand
- Full case name: Worsdale v Polglase
- Decided: 25 June 1981
- Citation: [1981] 1 NZLR 722

Court membership
- Judge sitting: Davison CJ

Worsdale v Polglase [1981] 1 NZLR 722 is a cited case in New Zealand regarding relief under the Contractual Remedies Act 1979 where a contract is repudiated by one of the parties.

== Background ==
The Worsdales entered into a contract in 1980 to purchase the Polglases' Paraparaumu home for $60,000, paying $6,000 deposit.

To finance their purchase, the Worsdales were expecting $20,000 from a business transaction, plus a further $28,000 from the sale of a property. However, 21 days before the date of settlement, both these funds had not materialized, and as a result, they advised the vendors that they had repudiated the contract.

On the following day, the vendors advised the Worsdales that they had now cancelled the contract, and on the same day, resold the property to another party for $60,000.

The Worsdales sought relief from the courts for their deposit of $6,000 that was forfeited

== Held ==
The court held that a deposit of 10% was customary, and refused to grant any relief here for a forfeited deposit of 10%.
