= Sebag Shaw =

British judge (1906–1982)

The Right Honourable Sir Sebag Shaw

Lord Justice of Appeal
- In office 30 September 1975 – 27 December 1981

Justice of the High Court
- In office 29 March 1968 – 30 September 1975

Sir Sebag Shaw, PC (28 December 1906 – 27 December 1982) was a British barrister and judge.

== Early life and career ==
Sebag Sochaczewski (later Shaw) was born in East London to Chaim Sochaczewski (later naturalised as 'Henry Shaw'; of Polish origin), owner of a photographic studio, and Marie (née Baumgart), and educated at Central Foundation Boys' School and University College London (LL.B). In his youth he had suffered a severe attack of polio, which left him with a pronounced limp, nevertheless becoming a skilled swimmer, rower and horseman. He was called 'Sib' by family and friends.

In 1928, he married Sally, daughter of Oscar Baumgart. He had one son, Jeffery Shaw, born 2 November 1930, who married Jane Garner in 1955, and one grandson, Hillary Shaw born in 1958.

He was called to the Bar from Gray's Inn in 1931, appointed Q.C. in 1967, and Bencher of Gray's Inn that same year, being later Leader of the South Eastern Circuit. Shaw served from 1958 to 1968 as Honorary Recorder of Ipswich, succeeding Sir Stephen Gerald Howard, QC, MP (1947–1958). Shaw was succeeded by the Hon. William McLaren Howard, QC.

In 1955 Shaw was junior counsel to Aubrey Melford Stevenson for the defence in the trial of Ruth Ellis; she was the last woman hanged in the United Kingdom.

In 1967, Shaw acting as prosecuting counsel for the Crown, secured a high profile conviction against gangster Charlie Richardson who was jailed for twenty-five years.

== Legal career ==
Knighted in 1968, Shaw was appointed a High Court judge and promoted to be a Lord Justice of Appeal in 1975; he served in this capacity until his retirement in 1981. He chaired the Justice Annual members conference in 1973. Shaw was a Member of the Bar Council from 1964 to 1968, and of the Parole Board from 1971 to 1974 (Vice-Chairman 1973–4).

Acting as a circuit judge, Shaw notably presided over the Winchester Crown Court trial of the 1972 Aldershot bombers, sentencing Noel Jenkinson to life imprisonment, with a minimum term of thirty-years.

Along with Judge Dennis Smith, Shaw wrote the text The Law of Meetings, which went through five editions over thirty years.
