= Doyle v Olby (Ironmongers) Ltd =

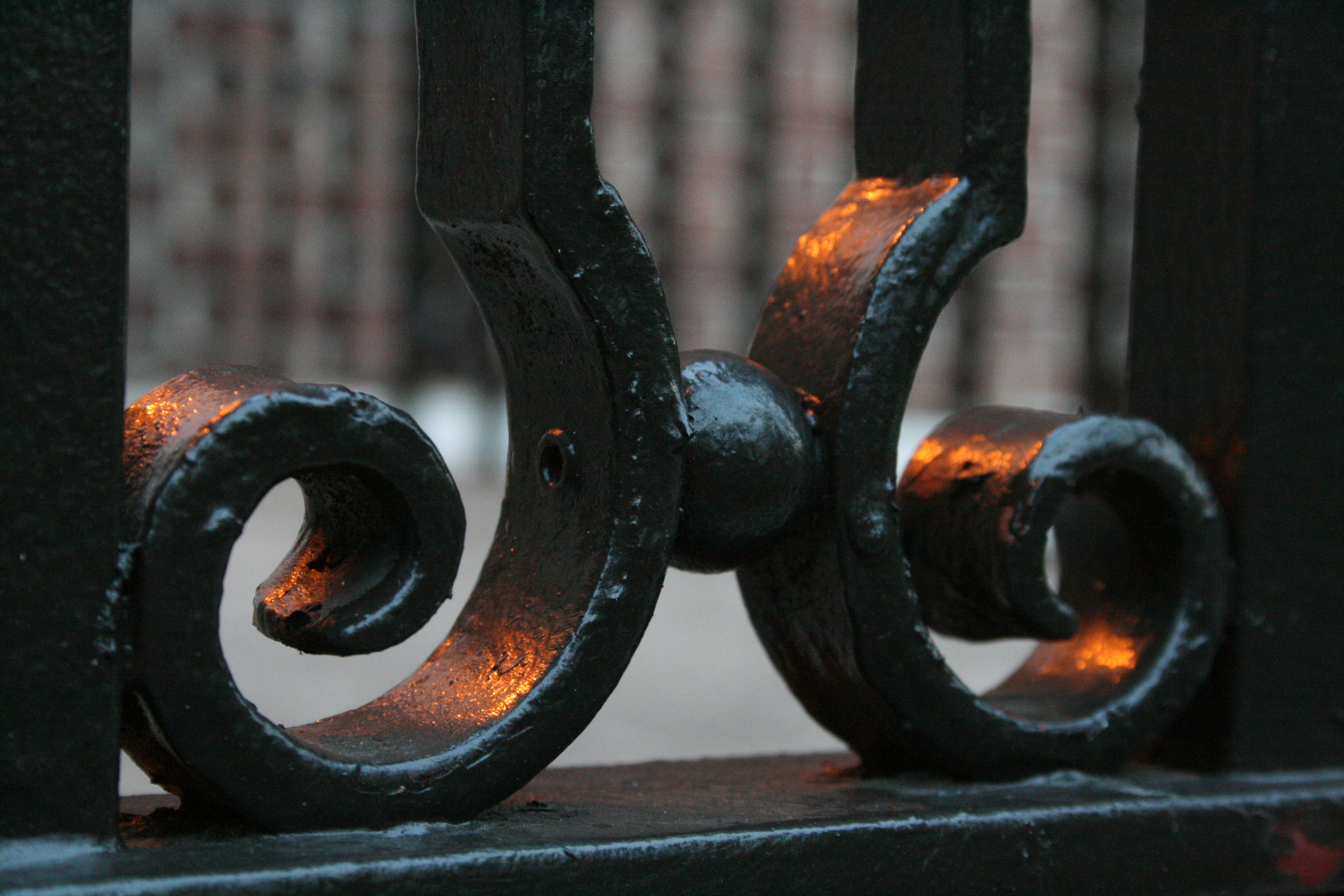
- Court: Court of Appeal
- Full case name: HERBERT LEONARD DOYLE Plaintiff Appellant and OLBY (IRONMONGERS) LIMITED CECIL AUGUSTUS OLBY LESLIE MORTON OLBY and A. OBLY & SON LIMITED
- Decided: 31 January 1969
- Citation: [1969] 2 QB 158
- Transcript

Keywords
- Misrepresentation, deceit

Doyle v Olby (Ironmongers) Ltd [1969] 2 QB 158 is an English contract law case concerning fraudulent misrepresentation. It illustrates and emphasizes the differing measures of damages for deceit and breach of contract.

== Facts ==
Herbert Doyle bought a business from Olby (Ironmongers) Ltd at 12, Upper High Street, Epsom, Surrey. Doyle was told the business was ‘all over the counter’. In reality, half the shop's business came via their travelling sales representative, and Doyle sustained heavy losses. The judge awarded £1500 in deceit, based on two and a half times the cost of employing a part-time rep at £600 p.a., as equivalent to the cost of making good the representation or the reduction in the value of the goodwill. Doyle appealed.

== Judgment ==
Lord Denning MR increased the damages to £5500. He said Doyle could claim for all damage flowing directly from the deceit which was not rendered too remote by Doyle's own conduct, whether or not the defendants could have foreseen such consequential loss. The plaintiff's position before the fraudulent inducement should be compared with his position at the end of the transaction. He said damages for fraud and conspiracy are differently assessed from those for breach of contract,

in contract, the defendant has made a promise and broken it. The object of damages is to put the plaintiff in as good a position, as far as money can do it, as if the promise had been performed. In fraud, the defendant has been guilty of a deliberate wrong by inducing the plaintiff to act to his detriment. The object of damages is to compensate the plaintiff for all the loss he has suffered, so far, again, as money can do it. In contract, the damages are limited to what may reasonably be supposed to have been in the contemplation of the parties. In fraud, they are not so limited. The defendant is bound to make reparation for all the actual damages directly flowing from the fraudulent inducement. The person who has been defrauded is entitled to say:

"I would not have entered into this bargain at all but for your representation. Owing to your fraud, I have not only lost all the money I paid you, but, what is more, I have been put to a large amount of extra expense as well and suffered this or that extra damages."

All such damages can be recovered: and it does not lie in the mouth of the fraudulent person to say that they could not reasonably have been foreseen. For instance, in this very case Doyle has not only lost the money which he paid for the business, which he would never have done if there had been no fraud: he put all that money in and lost it; but also he has been put to expense and loss in trying to run a business which has turned out to be a disaster for him. He is entitled to damages for all his loss, subject, of course to giving credit for any benefit that he has received. There is nothing to be taken off in mitigation: for there is nothing more that he could have done to reduce his loss. He did all that he could reasonably be expected to do.
