= Garratt v Ikeda =

- Court: Court of Appeal of New Zealand
- Full case name: CLIVE CHARLES GARRATT Appellant v KOZO IKEDA Respondent
- Decided: 13 September 2001
- Citation: [2002] 1 NZLR 577
- Transcript: Court of Appeal judgment

Court membership
- Judges sitting: Tipping, Blanchard J, McGrath J

Garratt v Ikeda [2002] 1 NZLR 577 is a cited case in New Zealand regarding where a contract is cancelled under the Contractual Remedies Act 1979, if the deposit has not been paid, it is still payable, despite section 8(3)(a).

== Background ==
Garratt agreed to purchase Ikeda's property for $1.83 million, with a 10% deposit, payable in 3 instalments.

After paying the first two instalments totaling $50,000, Garratt defaulted on the final $130,000 payment due on the deposit. As a result, Ikeda cancelled the sale, and resold the property to another party for $400,000 more than Garratt had agreed to purchase the property.

With the sale now cancelled, Garratt requested Ikeda to refund the $50,000 he had paid on the deposit. Ikeda refused, despite the fact that he had resold the property for a $400,000 profit.

Garratt eventually sued for his deposit back.

== Held ==
The court ruled that section 8(3)(a) did not apply here, as the deposit was a performed obligation at the date of the cancellation. Relief under section 9 for the $400,0000 resale profit, was also refused.
