= Young v Hunt =

- Court: High Court of New Zealand
- Full case name: Michael Francis James Young v Dawn Donna Hunt
- Decided: 22 November 1983
- Citation: [1984] 2 NZLR 80
- Transcript: http://www.nzlii.org/nz/cases/NZHC/1983/108.pdf

Court membership
- Judge sitting: Holland J

Keywords
- cancellation

Young v Hunt [1984] 2 NZLR 80 is a case that establishes in New Zealand case law that a contract can not simply be cancelled due to misrepresentation, unless that misrepresentation was a breach of an "essential" term of the contract.

== Background ==
Hunt sold Young a coffee bar in Kaiapoi, Christchurch for $11,300. After only 8 weeks however, Young abandoned the premises on the grounds of misrepresentation, claiming that the turnover was overstated by the vendor by 5%.

Young sought cancellation of the contract due to this misrepresentation, and the repayment of his deposit. Hunt countersued for the balance of the contract that remained unpaid.

== Held ==
The court held that as the contract did not make it an essential stipulation that if the turnover was incorrect, that the contract be cancelled, the plaintiff was not legally entitled to cancel the contract.

Holland J stated "The use of the world ‘essential’ in s 7(4)(a) of the Contractual Remedies Act [1979] must mean that the party would not proceed with the contract unless the representation were accurate".

Consequently, the judge allowed the defendants counterclaim, although interesting enough, refused to make an award for costs on the novel basis that the defendant had been awarded here a large amount of money already.
