= Cassidy v Ministry of Health =

English tort law and UK labour law case

- Court: Court of Appeal
- Citation: [1951] 2 KB 343, [1951] 1 All ER 574

Case opinions
- Denning LJ

Keywords
- Contract of employment

Cassidy v Ministry of Health [1951] 2 KB 343 is an English tort law and UK labour law case concerning the scope of vicarious liability.

== Facts ==
Mr Cassidy went to hospital for a routine operation on his hand, but came away with stiff fingers because of the negligence of one of the doctors. He attempted to sue the Ministry of Health in its capacity as employer. The Ministry argued it could not be held responsible and had no vicarious liability, relying partly on Collins v Hertfordshire where it had been suggested that a surgeon was not the 'servant' of his employer.

== Judgment ==
The Court of Appeal held that the doctor was indeed a servant of the hospital and the Ministry was vicariously liable, because the doctor was integrated into the health organisation. Denning LJ said,

The reason why the employers are liable in such cases is not because they can control the way in which the work is done - they often have not sufficient knowledge to do so - but because they employ the staff and have chosen them for the task and have in their hands the ultimate sanction for good conduct, the power of dismissal.

He also noted, that where a patient selects the doctor, then the doctor will not be employed by a hospital.

== See also ==
- Contract of employment in English law
- EU labour law
- US labor law
- German labour law
