= Misrepresentation Act 1967 =

Act of the Parliament of the United Kingdom

Misrepresentation Act 1967 (Note: Section 6(1).)
- Act of Parliament
- Parliament of the United Kingdom
- Long title: An Act to amend the law relating to innocent misrepresentations and to amend sections 11 and 35 of the Sale of Goods Act 1893.
- Citation: 1967 c. 7
- Territorial extent: England and Wales (Note: Section 6(3)–(4).)

Dates
- Royal assent: 22 March 1967
- Commencement: 22 April 1967 (Note: Section 6(2).)
Other legislation
Amends	Sale of Goods Act 1893
Amended by	Unfair Contract Terms Act 1977; Sale of Goods Act 1979; Consumer Protection (Amendment) Regulations 2014; Consumer Rights Act 2015

Status: Amended

Text of statute as originally enacted

Revised text of statute as amended

Text of the Misrepresentation Act 1967 as in force today (including any amendments) within the United Kingdom, from legislation.gov.uk.

The Misrepresentation Act 1967 (c. 7) is an act of the Parliament of the United Kingdom which amended the common law principles of misrepresentation in England and Wales. Prior to the act, the common law position was that there were two categories of misrepresentation: fraudulent and innocent. The effect of the act is primarily to create a new category by dividing innocent misrepresentation into two separate categories: negligent and "wholly" innocent; and it goes on to state the remedies in respect of each of the three categories.

== Contents ==
=== Section 1 ===
Removal of certain bars to rescission for innocent misrepresentation.
Where a person has entered into a contract after a misrepresentation has been made to him, and—

(a) the misrepresentation has become a term of the contract; or
(b) the contract has been performed;

or both, then, if otherwise he would be entitled to rescind the contract without alleging fraud, he shall be so entitled, subject to the provisions of this act, notwithstanding the matters mentioned in paragraphs (a) and (b) of this section.

=== Section 2(1) ===
Damages for misrepresentation.
(1) Where a person has entered into a contract after a misrepresentation has been made to him by another party thereto and as a result thereof he has suffered loss, then, if the person making the misrepresentation would be liable to damages in respect thereof had the misrepresentation been made fraudulently, that person shall be so liable notwithstanding that the misrepresentation was not made fraudulently, unless he proves that he had reasonable ground to believe and did believe up to the time the contract was made the facts represented were true.

=== Section 2(2) ===
Where a person has entered into a contract after a misrepresentation has been made to him otherwise than fraudulently, and he would be entitled, by reason of the misrepresentation, to rescind the contract, then, if it is claimed, in any proceedings arising out of the contract, that the contract ought to be or has been rescinded, the court or arbitrator may declare the contract subsisting and award damages in lieu of rescission, if of opinion that it would be equitable to do so, having regard to the nature of the misrepresentation and the loss that would be caused by it if the contract were upheld, as well as to the loss that rescission would cause to the other party.

=== Section 2(3) ===
Damages may be awarded against a person under subsection (2) of this section whether or not he is liable to damages under subsection (1) thereof, but where he is so liable any award under the said subsection (2) shall be taken into account in assessing his liability under the said subsection (1).

=== Section 2(4) ===
This section does not entitle a person to be paid damages in respect of a misrepresentation if the person has a right to redress under part 4A of the Consumer Protection from Unfair Trading Regulations 2008 (SI 2008/1277) in respect of the conduct constituting the misrepresentation. [commencement: 1 October 2014]

=== Section 2(5) ===
Subsection (4) does not prevent a debtor from bringing a claim under section 75(1) of the Consumer Credit Act 1974 against a creditor under a debtor-creditor-supplier agreement in a case where, but for subsection (4), the debtor would have a claim against the supplier in respect of a misrepresentation (and, where section 75 of that act would otherwise apply, it accordingly applies as if the debtor had a claim against the supplier). [commencement: 1 October 2014]

=== Section 3 ===
Avoidance of provision excluding liability for misrepresentation.
If a contract contains a term which would exclude or restrict—
(a) any liability to which a party to a contract may be subject by reason of any misrepresentation made by him before the contract was made; or
(b) any remedy available to another party to the contract by reason of such a misrepresentation,
that term shall be of no effect except in so far as it satisfies the requirement of reasonableness as stated in section 11(1) of the Unfair Contract Terms Act 1977; and it is for those claiming that the term satisfies that requirement to show that it does.

== Summary ==
At common law, a misrepresentation is an untrue (or misleading) statement of fact made by one party to another that induces the other to contract with him. The law of misrepresentation is a sui generis amalgam of the laws of contract, tort and unjust enrichment.

Although short and apparently succinct, the 1967 act is widely regarded as being confusing and poorly drafted. It was mildly amended by the Unfair Contract Terms Act 1977 and in 2012, but it escaped the attention of the consolidating Consumer Rights Act 2015.

The general position is that the Misrepresentation Act 1967 does not reach cases of misrepresentation by non-disclosure, though this has been challenged.

The 1967 act was introduced following the recommendations of the 10th report of the Law Reform Committee. Alan Brenner at the University College London has observed that the Act was a piece of law reform "aimed at ensuring justice and fairness for those that bought goods and services and was grounded in the socio-economic changes in post-war Britain". He has further suggested that the Act has "embedded itself in the societal consciousness" of the United Kingdom, which is the reason why it has remained relatively unchanged for over 50 years.

== See also ==
- Tort
- English contract law
