= Hochster v De La Tour =

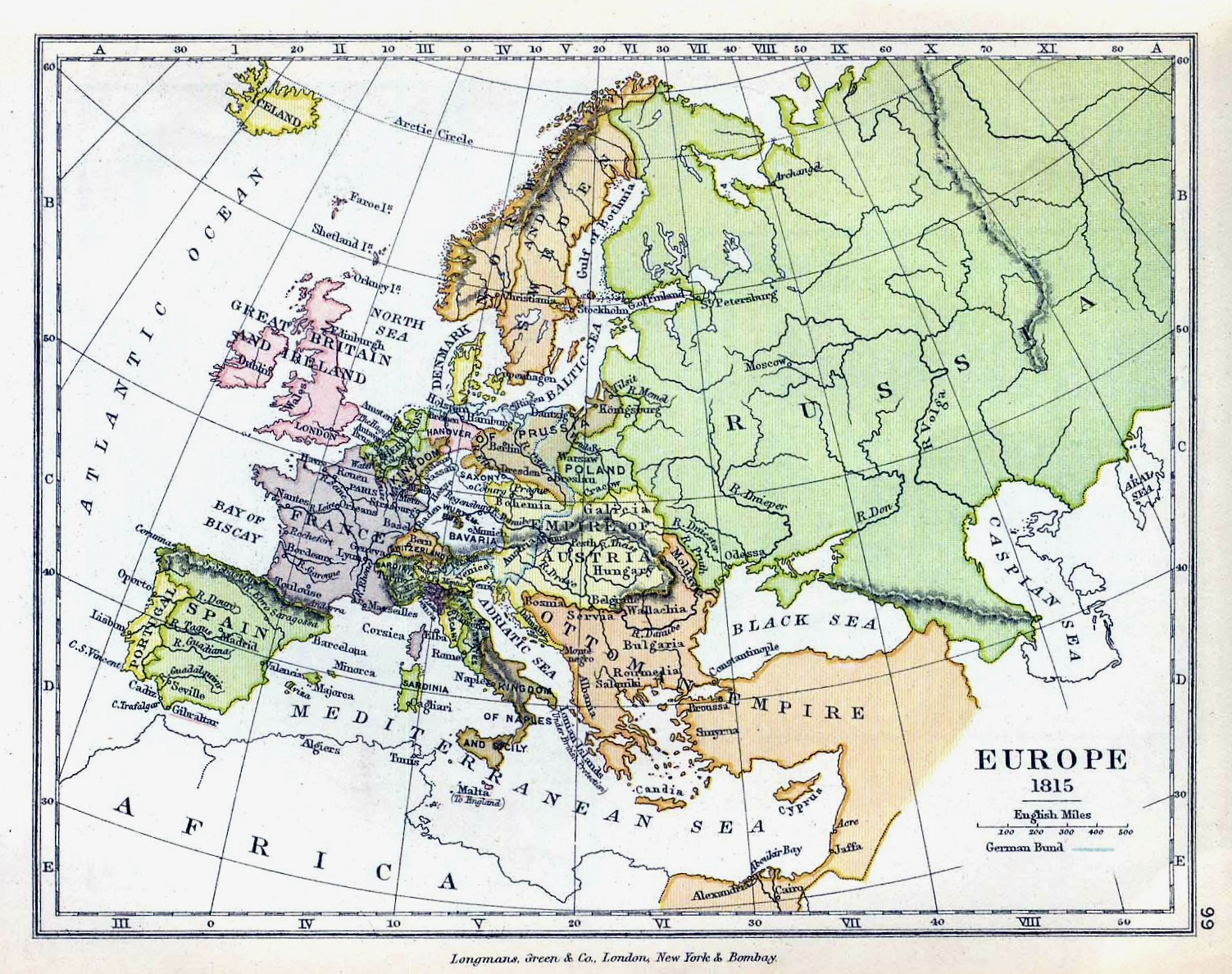
- Court: Queen's Bench
- Decided: 25 June 1853
- Citations: [1853] EWHC J72 (QB), (1853) 2 E&B 678, [1843-1860] All ER Rep 12
- Transcript: Full transcript

Case opinions
- Lord Campbell CJ

Hochster v De La Tour [1853] EWHC J72 (QB) is a landmark English contract law case on anticipatory breach of contract. It held that if a contract is repudiated before the date of performance, damages may be claimed immediately.

== Facts ==
In April 1852, Edgar De La Tour agreed to employ Albert Hochster as his courier for three months from 1 June 1852, to go on a trip around the European continent. On 11 May, De La Tour wrote to say that Hochster was no longer needed. On 22 May, Hochster sued. De La Tour argued that Hochster was still under an obligation to stay ready and willing to perform till the day when performance was due, and therefore could commence no action before.

== Judgment ==
Lord Campbell CJ held that Hochster did not need to wait until the date performance was due to commence the action and awarded damages.

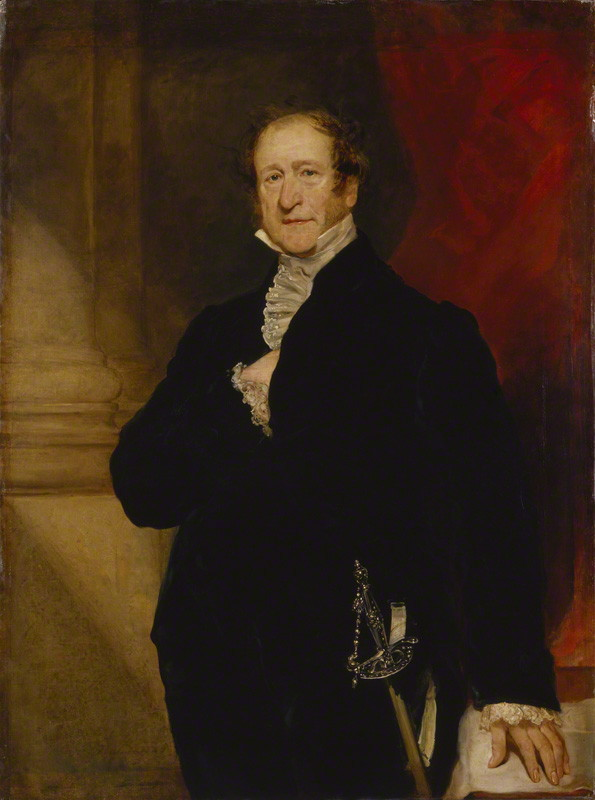
John Campbell, 1st Baron Campbell.

If a man promises to marry a woman on a future day, and before that day marries another woman, he is instantly liable to an action for breach of promise of marriage; Short v Stone. If a man contracts to execute a lease on and from a future day for a certain term, and, before that day, executes a lease to another for the same term, he may be immediately sued for breaking the contract; Ford v Tiley. So, if a man contracts to sell and deliver specific goods on a future day, and before the day he sells and delivers them to another, he is immediately liable to an action at the suit of the person with whom he first contracted to sell and deliver them; Bowdell v Parsons. One reason alleged in support of such an action is, that the defendant has, before the day, rendered it impossible for him to perform the contract at the day: but this does not necessarily follow; for, prior to the day fixed for doing the act, the first wife may have died, a surrender of the lease executed might be obtained, and the defendant might have repurchased the goods so as to be in a situation to sell and deliver them to the plaintiff. Another reason may be, that, where there is a contract to do an act on a future day, there is a relation constituted between the parties in the meantime by the contract, and that they impliedly promise that in the meantime neither will do any thing to the prejudice of the other inconsistent with that relation. As an example, a man and woman engaged to marry are affianced to one another during the period between the time of the engagement and the celebration of the marriage.

In the present case, of traveller and courier, from the day of the hiring till the day when the employment was to begin, they were engaged to each other; and it seems to be a breach of an implied contract if either of them renounces the engagement. This reasoning seems in accordance with the unanimous decision of the Exchequer Chamber in Elderton v Emmens, which we have followed in subsequent cases in this Court. The declaration in the present case, in alleging a breach, states a great deal more than a passing intention on the part of the defendant which he may repent of, and could only be proved by evidence that he had utterly renounced the contract, or done some act which rendered it impossible for him to perform it. If the plaintiff has no remedy for breach of the contract unless he treats the contract as in force, and acts upon it down to the 1st June 1852, it follows that, till then, he must enter into no employment which will interfere with his promise "to start with the defendant on such travels on the day and year," and that he must then be properly equipped in all respects as a courier for a three months' tour on the continent of Europe.

But it is surely much more rational, and more for the benefit of both parties, that, after the renunciation of the agreement by the defendant, the plaintiff should be at liberty to consider himself absolved from any future performance of it, retaining his right to sue for any damage he has suffered from the breach of it. Thus, instead of remaining idle and laying out money in preparations which must be useless, he is at liberty to seek service under another employer, which would go in mitigation of the damages to which he would otherwise be entitled for a breach of the contract. It seems strange that the defendant, after renouncing the contract, and absolutely declaring that he will never act under it, should be permitted to object that faith is given to his assertion, and that an opportunity is not left to him of changing his mind. If the plaintiff is barred of any remedy by entering into an engagement inconsistent with starting as a courier with the defendant on the 1st June, he is prejudiced by putting faith in the defendant's assertion: and it would be more consonant with principle, if the defendant were precluded from saying that he had not broken the contract when he declared that he entirely renounced it.

Suppose that the defendant, at the time of his renunciation, had embarked on a voyage for Australia, so as to render it physically impossible for him to employ the plaintiff as a courier on the continent of Europe in the months of June, July and August 1852: according to decided cases, the action might have been brought before the 1st June; but the renunciation may have been founded on other facts, to be given in evidence, which would equally have rendered the defendant's performance of the contract impossible. The man who wrongfully renounces a contract into which he has deliberately entered cannot justly complain if he is immediately sued for a compensation in damages by the man whom he has injured: and it seems reasonable to allow an option to the injured party, either to sue immediately, or to wait till the time when the act was to be done, still holding it as prospectively binding for the exercise of this option, which may be advantageous to the innocent party, and cannot be prejudicial to the wrongdoer.

An argument against the action before the 1st of June is urged from the difficulty of calculating the damages: but this argument is equally strong against an action before the 1st of September, when the three months would expire. In either case, the jury in assessing the damages would be justified in looking to all that had happened, or was likely to happen, to increase or mitigate the loss of the plaintiff down to the day of trial.

We do not find any decision contrary to the view we are taking of this case... The only other case cited in the argument which we think it necessary to notice is Planche v Colburn, which appears to be an authority for the plaintiff. There the defendants had engaged the plaintiff to write a treatise for a periodical publication. The plaintiff commenced the composition of the treatise; but, before he had completed it, and before the time when in the course of conducting the publication it would have appeared in print, the publication was abandoned. The plaintiff thereupon, without completing the treatise, brought an action for breach of contract. Objection was made that the plaintiff could not recover on the special contract for want of having completed, tendered and delivered the treatise, according to the contract. Tindal CJ said: "The fact was, that the defendants not only suspended, but actually put an end to, 'The Juvenile Library;' they had broken their contract with the plaintiff." The declaration contained counts for work and labour: but the plaintiff appears to have retained his verdict on the count framed on the special contract, thus shewing that, in the opinion of the Court, the plaintiff might treat the renunciation of the contract by the defendants as a breach, and maintain an action for that breach, without considering that it remained in force so as to bind him to perform his part of it before bringing an action for the breach of it.

If it should be held that, upon a contract to do an act on a future day, a renunciation of the contract by one party dispenses with a condition to be performed in the meantime by the other, there seems no reason for requiring that other to wait till the day arrives before seeking his remedy by action: and the only ground on which the condition can be dispensed with seems to be, that the renunciation may be treated as a breach of the contract.

Upon the whole, we think that the declaration in this case is sufficient. It gives us great satisfaction to reflect that, the question being on the record, our opinion may be reviewed in a Court of Error. In the meantime we must give judgment for the plaintiff.

Judgment for plaintiff.

== See also ==
- Vitol SA v Norelf Ltd (or The Santa Clara) [1996] 3 All ER 971
- White & Carter (Councils) Ltd v McGregor [1962] AC 413
