= Kate Bingham =

British venture capital manager (born 1965)

The Honourable Dame Catherine Bingham DBE HonFRS HonFREng
- Born: Catherine Elizabeth Bingham; 19 October 1965 (age 60); London, England
- Education: University of Oxford (MA); Harvard University (MBA)
- Occupation: Venture capitalist
- Spouse: Jesse Norman (m. 1992)
- Parents: Lord Bingham of Cornhill (father); Elizabeth (née Loxley), Lady Bingham (mother)

Dame Catherine Elizabeth Bingham (born 19 October 1965) is a British venture capitalist, who is a managing partner at a venture capital firm, SV Health Investors. In 2020, Bingham chaired the government's Vaccine Taskforce, steering procurement of vaccines during the COVID-19 pandemic in the United Kingdom.

== Early life and education ==
Bingham was born in London, the only daughter of the barrister and judge Tom Bingham (later Lord Bingham of Cornhill) and Elizabeth (née Loxley) and the eldest of their three children. She attended St Paul's Girls' School, London, before going on to study at the University of Oxford where she was an undergraduate student of Christ Church. She graduated with a first-class degree in biochemistry, and was subsequently promoted to MA.

Bingham then pursued further studies at Harvard Business School, taking the degree of MBA. She has an honorary doctorate from Imperial College London.

== Career ==
Bingham worked in business development for Vertex Pharmaceuticals and consultants Monitor Company before joining Schroder Ventures in 1991 (now SV Health Investors). She became a managing partner specialising in biotechnology.

As of January 2021, Bingham is listed as being a director of the following active companies: Mestag Therapeutics Ltd; Cybele Therapeutics Ltd; Bicycle tx Ltd; Bicycle Therapeutics plc; Sitryx Therapeutics Ltd; Pulmocide Ltd; Autifony Therapeutics Ltd; Bicycle RD Ltd; SV Health Investors Ltd (whose subsidiaries include the Dementia Discovery Fund); and SV Health Managers LLP.

She also serves on the boards of the Francis Crick Institute and the British government's Advanced Research and Invention Agency.

=== Vaccine Taskforce ===
In May 2020, Bingham was appointed chair of the UK Vaccine Taskforce, without a competitive recruitment process. The body was set up to manage the path towards the introduction of a COVID-19 vaccine in the UK and its global distribution. In this unpaid role, which continued until the end of the year, she reported to the prime minister, Boris Johnson. In October, she was one of the participants in a trial of a vaccine by Novavax. Her work on the UK's vaccination rollout programme was praised by scientists and international media, particularly for securing 350 million doses of six vaccines and setting up infrastructure for clinical trials, manufacturing and distribution.

According to leaked documents seen in November 2020 by The Sunday Times, Bingham charged taxpayers £670,000 for a team of eight full-time consultants from London public relations agency Admiral Associates. In his 2024 memoir Unleashed, Johnson wrote that criticism of this expenditure was unwarranted because "she was in fact trying to gauge public sentiment about vaccines – an absolutely crucial consideration given some of the challenges we were to face in the subsequent roll-out".

Bingham's account of the risks, criticism and political interference she faced are discussed in her book The Long Shot, published in October 2022 with all proceeds going to the New Model Institute for Technology and Engineering. In this, she detailed the need for a specialist health communications capability to launch a national Vaccines Registry, which was a core part of the vaccine procurement and development strategy and that this was contracted by the Department of Business Energy and Industrial Strategy.

=== Awards and honours ===
In 2016, Bingham received an honorary doctorate from the University of Bath. In January 2017, she received the Lifetime Achievement Award of the BioIndustry Association UK.

She was appointed Dame Commander of the Order of the British Empire (DBE) in the 2021 Birthday Honours for "services to the procurement, manufacture and distribution of Covid-19 vaccines"; Bingham was also admitted to the Freedom of the City of London in that year. She was elected an Honorary Fellow of the Royal Society (HonFRS) in 2023 and was elected an Honorary Fellow of the Royal Academy of Engineering (HonFREng) later the same year. She is a Fellow of the Academy of Medical Sciences (FMedSci) and holds honorary fellowships from the Faculty of Pharmaceutical Medicine and the British Pharmacological Society

== Views on science policies ==
Bingham has expressed views on how the UK COVID vaccination programme could have been better run, and on how UK potential in life sciences could be improved. She published her account of the seven months she spent chairing the Vaccine Taskforce in her book The Long Shot, in which she shared lessons for future pandemics and offered advice on how government could work more successfully with industry.

== Personal life ==
Bingham married Jesse Norman in 1992; the couple have two sons and a daughter. Norman is a Conservative Party politician and since 2010 has been a member of Parliament; he held various ministerial posts from 2016 to 2023.
