= Blackpool & Fylde Aero Club v Blackpool BC =

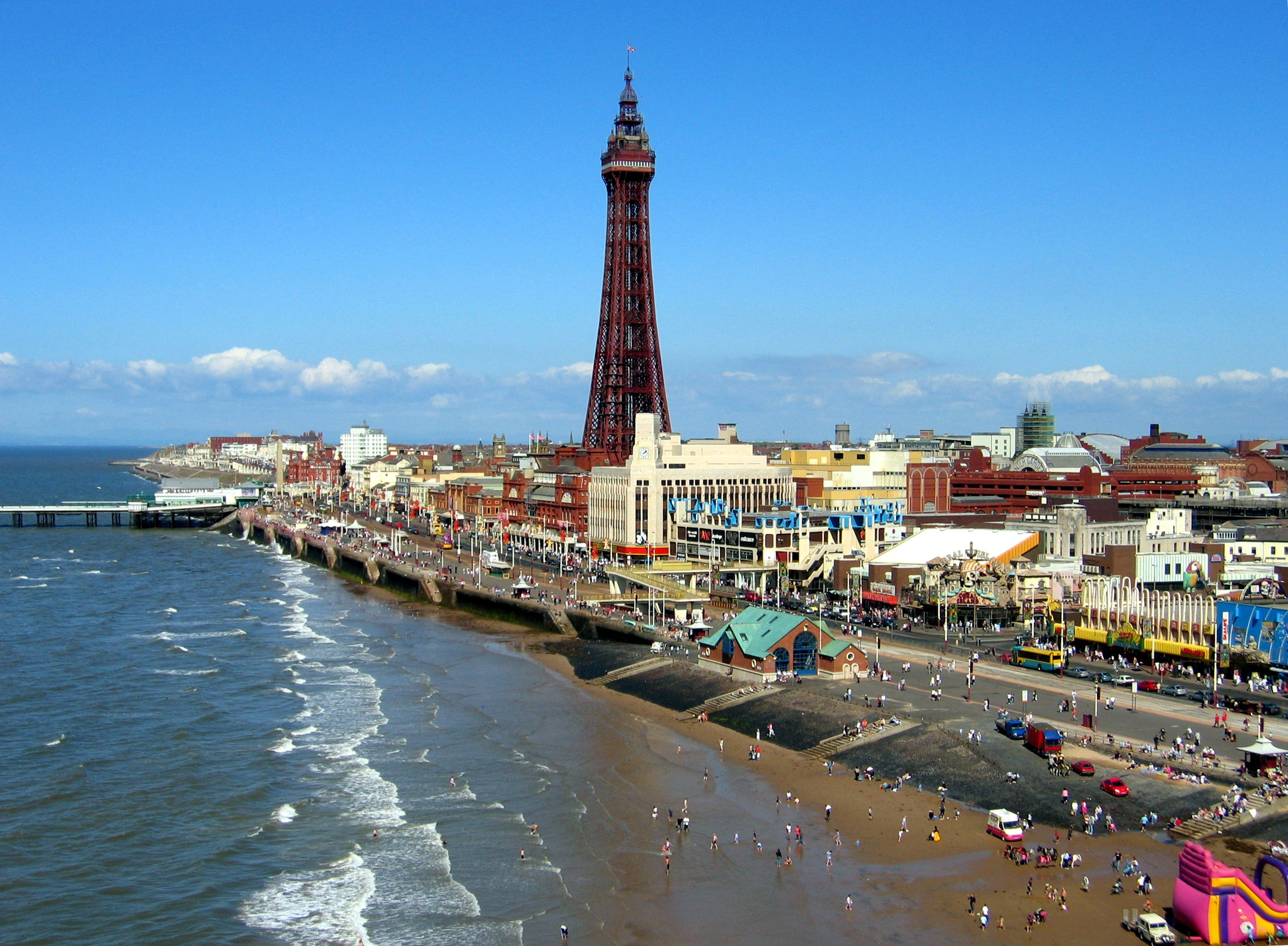
- Court: Court of Appeal of England and Wales Civil Division
- Full case name: Blackpool & Fylde Aero Club Ltd v Blackpool Borough Council
- Decided: 25 May 1990
- Citations: [1990] EWCA Civ 13, [1990] 1 WLR 1196

Court membership
- Judges sitting: Stocker LJ, Bingham LJ, Farquharson LJ

Keywords
- tender, offer, duty to inspect

Blackpool & Fylde Aero Club v Blackpool Borough Council [1990] EWCA Civ 13 is a leading English contract law case on the issue of offer and acceptance in relation to an invitation to tender. In it the Court of Appeal of England and Wales decided that tenders and requests for tenders are accompanied by a collateral contract implying that the requestor will give due consideration to any timely bid.

== Facts ==
Blackpool Borough Council ran Blackpool Airport, and gave a licence to a single company to run pleasure flights to and from the airport. Blackpool & Fylde Aero Club had held this licence since 1975, and had been granted it again in 1978 and 1980. In 1983 the current licence was due to expire, and the council sent out letters to seven organisations, including the Aero Club, inviting new tenders to a licence to operate light and heavy aircraft from the airport, requiring a reply to be at the Town Hall 'not later than 12 o'clock noon on Thursday 17 March 1983'.

Three organisations replied, two of which sent in light bids for only the lighter class of aircraft. The Aero Club sent in a significantly higher bid for both classes of aircraft, and placed their offer in the Town Hall letter box at 11 am on the 17th, an hour before the deadline. The Town Clerk's staff failed to empty the letter box at 12 noon as they were expected to do, and as a result the letter was not considered 'delivered' until after the deadline, and the licence was granted to one of the other bidders, Red Rose Helicopters.

After discussions between the Aero Club and the Council it became apparent the letter had been delivered on time, and the Council decided to rectify the situation by declaring the previous round of tenders invalid and inviting the submission of new tenders. At this point Red Rose Helicopters, having consulted their lawyers, informed the Council that they were contractually bound to grant the licence to them. As a result of this the Council withdrew their offer of a second round of tenders, and pursued the contract with Red Rose Helicopters. The case went to the High Court of Justice, where the judge found in favour of the club. The Council appealed, and it was taken to the Court of Appeal, where Roger Toulson QC and Hugh Davies represented the Council, and Michael Shorrock QC and Paul Sylvester represented the Aero Club.

== Judgment ==
Bingham LJ's leading judgement read:

A tendering procedure of this kind is, in many respects, heavily weighted in favour of the invitor. He can invite tenders from as many or as few parties as he chooses. He need not tell any of them who else, or how many others, he has invited. The invitee may often, although not here, be put to considerable labour and expense in preparing a tender, ordinarily without recompense if he is unsuccessful. The invitation to tender may itself, in a complex case, although again not here, involve time and expense to prepare, but the invitor does not commit himself to proceed with the project, whatever it is; he need not accept the highest tender; he need not accept any tender; he need not give reasons to justify his acceptance or rejection of any tender received. The risk to which the tenderer is exposed does not end with the risk that his tender may not be the highest (or, as the case may be, lowest). But where, as here, tenders are solicited from selected parties all of them known to the invitor, and where a local authority's invitation prescribes a clear, orderly and familiar procedure (draft contract conditions available for inspection and plainly not open to negotiation, a prescribed common form of tender, the supply of envelopes designed to preserve the absolute anonymity of tenderers and clearly to identify the tender in question, and an absolute deadline) the invitee is in my judgement protected at least to this extent: if he submits a conforming tender before the deadline he is entitled, not as a matter of mere expectation but of contractual right, to be sure that his tender will after the deadline be opened and considered in conjunction with all other conforming tenders or at least that his tender will be considered if others are. Had the Club, before tendering, enquired of the Council whether it could rely on any timely and conforming tender being considered along with others, I feel quite sure that the answer would have been "of course". The law would, I think, be defective if it did not give effect to that.

It is of course true that the invitation to tender does not explicitly state that the Council will consider timely and conforming tenders. That is why one is concerned with implication. But the Council does not either say that it does not bind itself to do anything, and in the context a reasonable invitee would understand the invitation to be saying, quite clearly, that if he submitted a timely and conforming tender it would be considered, at least if any other such tender were considered.

I readily accept that contracts are not to be lightly implied. Having examined what the parties said and did, the court must be able to conclude with confidence both that the parties intended to create contractual relations and that the agreement was to the effect contended for. It must also, in most cases, be able to answer the question posed by Mustill LJ in The Kapetan Markos NL (No 2) [1987] 2 LI. 321 at 331: "What was the mechanism for offer and acceptance?" In all the circumstances of this case (and I say nothing about any other) I have no doubt that the parties did intend to create contractual relations to the limited extent contended for. Since it has never been the law that a person is only entitled to enforce his contractual rights in a reasonable way (White and Carter (Councils) Ltd v McGregor [1962] AC 413 at 430 A, per Lord Reid), Mr. Shorrock was in my view right to contend for no more than a contractual duty to consider. I think it plain that the Council's invitation to tender was, to this limited extent, an offer, and the Club's submission of a timely and conforming tender an acceptance.

Mr. Toulson's fourth submission is a salutary warning, but it is not a free-standing argument: if, as I hold, his first three submissions are to be rejected, no subversion of principle is involved. I am, however, pleased that what seems to me the right legal answer also accords with the merits as I see them.

I accordingly agree with the learned judge's conclusion on the contractual issue, essentially for the reasons which he more briefly gave.

This conclusion makes it unnecessary to consider at length the Club's alternative argument, which the judge also accepted, that if there was no contract at all between the parties the Council nonetheless owed the Club a duty to take reasonable care to see to it that if the Club submitted a tender by the deadline it would be considered along with other tenders duly returned when the decision to grant the concession was made.

Mr. Shorrock sought to sustain this argument in particular by reliance on Ministry of Housing and Local Government v Sharp [1970] 2 QB 223, Ross v Caunters [1980] Ch 297 and American Express International Banking Corporation v Hurley [1985] 3 All ER 564, none of which (he submitted) was inconsistent with the principles laid down in the House of Lords' recent decision in Caparo Industries plc v Dickman [1990] 2 WLR 358.

Mr. Toulson urged that the court should not introduce a common law duty of care into an area of pre-contractual negotiations where the parties could, if they wished, have introduced such a duty by agreement but had not done so: Tai Hing Cotton Mill v Liu Chong Hing Bank [1986] AC 80. Although a duty to take reasonable care not to cause pure economic loss could be held to exist, such cases were rare and confined to limited classes of case which did not include the present case and with which the present case had no analogy. The plaintiff's task was even harder where, as Mr. Toulson argued was the case here, his complaint was of a mere omission. Mr. Toulson argued, if it was necessary to do so, that Ross v Caunters was wrongly decided.

I am reluctant to venture into this somewhat unvirginal territory when it is unnecessary to do so for the purpose of deciding this case. Having heard the argument, I am tentatively of opinion that Mr. Toulson's objections are correct and that the Club cannot succeed on this point if they fail on the other. But I do not think it necessary or desirable to express a final conclusion.

I would accordingly dismiss the appeal. The practical consequences of deciding the contractual issue on liability in the Club's favour must, if necessary, be decided hereafter.

Stocker LJ agreed with Bingham LJ, and added:

The format of the invitation to tender document itself suggests, in my view, that a legal obligation to consider to tender submitted before any award of a concession was made to any other operator was to be implied in the case of any operator of aircraft to whom the invitation was directed who complied with its terms and conditions. The fact that the invitation to tender was limited to a very small class of operators is itself of significance. The circumstances surrounding the issue of the invitation to tender and the formal requirements imposed by it support the conclusion. Of particular significance, in my view, was the requirement that tenders be submitted in the official envelope supplied and endorsed, as described by Bingham LJ., by the Council. The purpose of this requirement must surely have been to preserve the anonymity of the tenderer and, in conjunction with the defendants' Standing Orders, to prevent any premature leak of the nature and amount of such tender to other interested or potentially interested parties. Such a requirement, as a condition of the validity of the tender submitted, seems pointless unless all tenders submitted in time and in accordance with the requirements are to be considered before any award of the concession is made. There can be no doubt that this was the intention of both parties, as exemplified by the defendants' actions when their error with regard to the time of receipt of the plaintiffs' tender was appreciated. Such a common intention can, of course, exist without giving rise to any contractual obligations, but the circumstances of this case indicate to me that this is one of the fairly rare exceptions to the general rule expounded in the leading cases of Spencer v Harding [1870] LR 5 CP 561 and Harris v Nickerson [1873] LR 8 QB 286. I therefore agree that in all the circumstances of this case there was an intention to create binding legal obligations if and when a tender was submitted in accordance with the terms of the invitation to tender, and that a binding contractual obligation arose that the plaintiffs' tender would be before the officer or committee by whom the decision was to be taken for consideration before a decision was made or any tender accepted. This would not preclude or inhibit the defendants from deciding not to accept any tender or to award the concession, provided the decision was bona fide and honest, to any tenderer. The obligation was that the plaintiffs' tender would be before the deciding body for consideration before any award was made. Accordingly, in my view, the conclusion of the learned judge and his reasons were correct.

I agree that in the light of this conclusion no useful purpose can be served by consideration of the difficult questions which arise upon the claim formulated in tort.

Accordingly I agree with the conclusions reached by Bingham LJ, and with the detailed reasoning contained in his judgment and agree that this appeal should be dismissed.

Farquharson LJ agreed with the other two judges, and made no comment.

== See also ==
- English contract law
- The Aramis [1989] 1 Lloyd’s Rep 213
