= Balfour v Balfour =

1919 English contract law case

- Court: Court of Appeal (Civil Division)
- Full case name: Balfour v Balfour
- Decided: 25 June 1919
- Citation: [1919] 2 KB 571
- Legislation cited: Married Women's Property Act 1882

Case opinions
- Warrington LJ, Duke LJ and Atkin LJ

Keywords
- Causes of action; Intention to create legal relations; Maintenance; Marriage; Oral contracts

Balfour v Balfour [1919] 2 KB 571 is a leading English contract law case. It held that there is a rebuttable presumption against an intention to create a legally enforceable agreement when the agreement is domestic in nature.

== Facts ==
Mr. Balfour was a civil engineer, and worked for the Government as the Director of Irrigation in Ceylon (now Sri Lanka). Mrs Balfour was living with him. In 1915, they both came back to England during Mr Balfour's leave. But Mrs Balfour had developed rheumatoid arthritis. Her doctor advised her to stay in England, because the climate in Ceylon would be detrimental to her health. Mr Balfour's boat was about to set sail, and he orally promised her £30 a month until she came back to Ceylon. They drifted apart, and Mr Balfour wrote saying it was better that they remain apart. In March 1918, Mrs Balfour sued him to keep up with the monthly £30 payments. In July she got a decree nisi and in December she obtained an order for alimony.

At first instance, the judge Sargent J, held that Mr Balfour was under an obligation to support his wife.

== Judgment ==
The Court of Appeal unanimously held that there was no enforceable agreement, although the depth of their reasoning differed. Warrington LJ delivered his opinion first, the core part being this passage.

The matter really reduces itself to an absurdity when one considers it, because if we were to hold that there was a contract in this case we should have to hold that with regard to all the more or less trivial concerns of life where a wife, at the request of her husband, makes a promise to him, that is a promise which can be enforced in law. All I can say is that there is no such contract here. These two people never intended to make a bargain which could be enforced in law. The husband expressed his intention to make this payment, and he promised to make it, and was bound in honour to continue it so long as he was in a position to do so. The wife on the other hand, so far as I can see, made no bargain at all. That is in my opinion sufficient to dispose of the case.

Then Duke LJ gave his. He placed weight on the fact that the parties had not yet been divorced, and that the promise had been made still whilst as husband and wife.

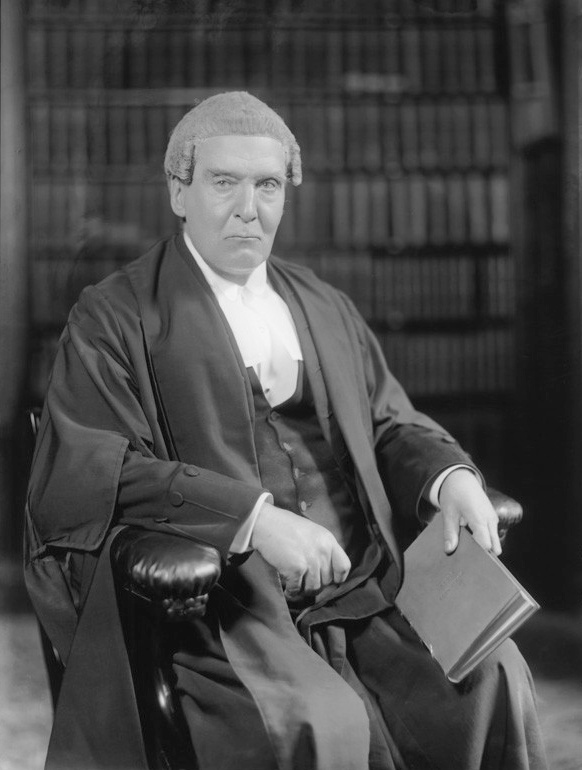
Duke LJ, previously a Conservative party politician, became the president of the divorce division from 1919 to 1933.

In the Court below the plaintiff conceded that down to the time of her suing in the Divorce Division there was no separation, and that the period of absence was a period of absence as between husband and wife living in amity. An agreement for separation when it is established does involve mutual considerations.

That was why in Eastland v Burchell 3 QBD 432, the agreement for separation was found by the learned judge to have been of decisive consequence. But in this case there was no separation agreement at all. The parties were husband and wife, and subject to all the conditions, in point of law, involved in that relationship. It is impossible to say that where the relationship of husband and wife exists, and promises are exchanged, they must be deemed to be promises of a contractual nature. In order to establish a contract there ought to be something more than mere mutual promises having regard to the domestic relations of the parties. It is required that the obligations arising out of that relationship shall be displaced before either of the parties can found a contract upon such promises. The formula which was stated in this case to support the claim of the lady was this: In consideration that you will agree to give me 30l. a month I will agree to forego my right to pledge your credit. In the judgment of the majority of the Court of Common Pleas in Jolly v Rees (1864) 15 C. B. (N. S.) 628, which was affirmed in the decision of Debenham v Mellon (1880) 6 App. Cas. 24 Erle C.J. states this proposition 5 : “But taking the law to be, that the power of the wife to charge her husband is in the capacity of his agent, it is a solecism in reasoning to say that she derives her authority from his will, and at the same time to say that the relation of wife creates the authority against his will, by a presumptio juris et de jure from marriage.” What is said on the part of the wife in this case is that her arrangement with her husband that she should assent to that which was in his discretion to do or not to do was the consideration moving from her to her husband. The giving up of that which was not a right was not a consideration. The proposition that the mutual promises made in the ordinary domestic relationship of husband and wife of necessity give cause for action on a contract seems to me to go to the very root of the relationship, and to be a possible fruitful source of dissension and quarrelling. I cannot see that any benefit would result from it to either of the parties, but on the other hand it would lead to unlimited litigation in a relationship which should be obviously as far as possible protected from possibilities of that kind. I think, therefore, that in point of principle there is no foundation for the claim which is made here, and I am satisfied that there was no consideration *578 moving from the wife to the husband or promise by the husband to the wife which was sufficient to sustain this action founded on contract. I think, therefore, that the appeal must be allowed.

Atkin LJ took a different approach, emphasising that there was no "intention to affect legal relations". That was so because it was a domestic agreement between husband and wife, and it meant the onus of proof was on the plaintiff, Mrs Balfour. She did not rebut the presumption.

The defence to this action on the alleged contract is that the defendant, the husband, entered into no contract with his wife, and for the determination of that it is necessary to remember that there are agreements between parties which do not result in contracts within the meaning of that term in our law. The ordinary example is where two parties agree to take a walk together, or where there is an offer and an acceptance of hospitality. Nobody would suggest in ordinary circumstances that those agreements result in what we know as a contract, and one of the most usual forms of agreement which does not constitute a contract appears to me to be the arrangements which are made between husband and wife. It is quite common, and it is the natural and inevitable result of the relationship of husband and wife, that the two spouses should make arrangements between themselves - agreements such as are in dispute in this action - agreements for allowances, by which the husband agrees that he will pay to his wife a certain sum of money, per week, or per month, or per year, to cover either her own expenses or the necessary expenses of the household and of the children of the marriage, and in which the wife promises either expressly or impliedly to apply the allowance for the purpose for which it is given. To my mind those agreements, or many of them, do not result in contracts at all, and they do not result in contracts even though there may be what as between other parties would constitute consideration for the agreement. The consideration, as we know, may consist either in some right, interest, profit or benefit accruing to one party, or some forbearance, detriment, loss or responsibility given, suffered or undertaken by the other. That is a well-known definition, and it constantly happens, I think, that such arrangements made between husband and wife are arrangements in which there are mutual promises, or in which there is consideration in form within the definition that I have mentioned. Nevertheless they are not contracts, and they are not contracts because the parties did not intend that they should be attended by legal consequences. To my mind it would be of the worst possible example to hold that agreements such as this resulted in legal obligations which could be enforced in the Courts. It would mean this, that when the husband makes his wife a promise to give her an allowance of 30s. or 2l. a week, whatever he can afford to give her, for the maintenance of the household and children, and she promises so to apply it, not only could she sue him for his failure in any week to supply the allowance, but he could sue her for non-performance of the obligation, express or implied, which she had undertaken upon her part. All I can say is that the small Courts of this country would have to be multiplied one hundredfold if these arrangements were held to result in legal obligations. They are not sued upon, not because the parties are reluctant to enforce their legal rights when the agreement is broken, but because the parties, in the inception of the arrangement, never intended that they should be sued upon. Agreements such as these are outside the realm of contracts altogether. The common law does not regulate the form of agreements between spouses. Their promises are not sealed with seals and sealing wax. The consideration that really obtains for them is that natural love and affection which counts for so little in these cold Courts. The terms may be repudiated, varied or renewed as performance proceeds or as disagreements develop, and the principles of the common law as to exoneration and discharge and accord and satisfaction are such as find no place in the domestic code. The parties themselves are advocates, judges, Courts, sheriff's officer and reporter. In respect of these promises each house is a domain into which the King's writ does not seek to run, and to which his officers do not seek to be admitted. The only question in this case is whether or not this promise was of such a class or not. For the reasons given by my brethren it appears to me to be plainly established that the promise here was not intended by either party to be attended by legal consequences. I think the onus was upon the plaintiff, and the plaintiff has not established any contract. The parties were living together, the wife intending to return. The suggestion is that the husband bound himself to pay 30l. a month under all circumstances, and she bound herself to be satisfied with that sum under all circumstances, and, although she was in ill-health and alone in this country, that out of that sum she undertook to defray the whole of the medical expenses that might fall upon her, whatever might be the development of her illness, and in whatever expenses it might involve her. To my mind neither party contemplated such a result. I think that the parol evidence upon which the case turns does not establish a contract. I think that the letters do not evidence such a contract, or amplify the oral evidence which was given by the wife, which is not in dispute. For these reasons I think the judgment of the Court below was wrong and that this appeal should be allowed.

== Significance ==
The case is often cited in conjunction with Merritt v Merritt [1970] 2 All ER 760; [1970] 1 WLR 1211. Here the court distinguished the case from Balfour v Balfour on the fact that Mr and Mrs Merritt, although still married, were estranged at the time the agreement was made and therefore any agreement between them was made with the intention to create legal relations. Both cases are often quoted examples of the principle of precedent.

== See also ==
- Creating legal relations in English law
- Mechanisms of the English common law
- Diwell v Farnes [1959] 1 WLR 624; [1959] 2 All ER 379;
- Gould v Gould [1970] 1 QB 275; [1969] 3 WLR 490; [1969] 3 All ER 728
- Hoddinott v Hoddinott [1949] 2 KB 406
- Jones v Padavatton [1969] 1 WLR 328; [1969] 2 All ER 616
- Spellman v Spellman [1961] 1 WLR 921; [1961] 2 All ER 498
- Merritt v Merritt [1970] 1 WLR 1211; [1970] 2 All ER 760
- Robinson v Customs and Excise Commissioners [2000] Po LR 112; Times, April 28, 2000
- Plate v Durst, 42 W.Va. 63, 66-67, 24 S.E. 580, 581, 32 LRA 404 (1896). Defendant promised plaintiff $1000 and a diamond ring if she would remain his domestic servant for 10 years, and she did, but then he claimed the promise was only in jest. Held that there was a valid contract. "Jokes are sometimes taken seriously... if such is the case, and thereby the person deceived is led to give valuable services in the full belief and expectation that the joker is in earnest, the law will also take the joker at his word, and give him good reason to smile."
