= Cable & Wireless plc v Muscat =

UK labour law case

- Court: Court of Appeal of England and Wales
- Full case name: Cable & Wireless Plc v Mr P Muscat
- Decided: March 9, 2006
- Citations: [2006] EWCA Civ 220, [2006] ICR 975

Court membership
- Judges sitting: Sir Anthony Clarke MR, Smith LJ and Maurice Kay LJ

Keywords
- Implied contract, sham terms

Cable & Wireless plc v Muscat [2006] EWCA Civ 220 is a UK labour law case, concerning the test for an implied contract between an employee and a place they work through an employment agency. It holds that with reference to the reality of the relationship, an implied contract should be found according to the ordinary rules of construction.

== Facts ==
Mr Muscat was employed as a telecommunications specialist by Exodus Ltd in 2001. In September 2001 he was told he should become a contractor and provide his services through a limited company, which was part of making Exodus more attractive for a takeover bid. Exodus Ltd dismissed him in October and then reengaged his services, paying him through E-Nuff Ltd. In April 2002, Exodus Ltd was taken over by Cable & Wireless plc (C&W). In August 2002, C&W told Mr Muscat (and E-Nuff Ltd) to supply his services through an agency called Abraxas plc. He got a new contract that said:

The relationship between the parties to the Contract is one of independent Suppliers and nothing contained in this agreement shall be construed as constituting or establishing any partnership or joint venture or relationship of employee and employer between the parties. Upon completion of a Works Schedule, there is no obligation by the Company or the Client (which in this case would be C&W) to provide future assignments to the Consultancy, neither is there an obligation for the Consultancy to provide future services to the Company or the Client.

However, in C&W’s internal documents Mr Muscat was described as an employee. In December 2002, C&W dismissed him. Abraxas paid Mr Muscat invoices for the work done by him. He claimed unfair dismissal. C&W submitted that because the agency paid Mr Muscat, there was insufficient mutuality of obligation between C&W and Mr Muscat.

The Employment Tribunal held Mr Muscat was employed by Exodus at the time of the takeover, and despite the agency contract, he had an implied employment contract with C&W. Since he had been continuously employed for over a year, and TUPER 1981 applied, he was entitled to bring his claim. Judge Serota QC in the Employment Appeal Tribunal dismissed C&W’s appeal.

== Judgment ==
Smith LJ read the judgment for Sir Anthony Clarke MR and Maurice Kay LJ which dismissed the appeal again. In a triangular case, where one works for an end user but is paid by an agency, a judge should consider the whole evidence to find an implied contract, following Dacas. A contract is to be inferred when it is necessary to give business reality to the relationship, and where both mutuality and control by an end user are present. It did not matter whether remuneration was paid by the agency, as long as it was ultimately paid by the end-user. The Aramis was approved. Mr Muscat’s contract with Abraxas did not affect the subsisting relationship with C&W.

48. We accept that the question whether it is necessary to infer the existence of an employment contract between two parties may sometimes be difficult. In this particular case we do not think it is. It is common ground that from April until 13 August 2002 Mr Muscat was employed by Cable & Wireless. True it is that Cable & Wireless did not think he was their employee, but what the parties may think or say about their relationship is not conclusive. The issue must be determined objectively... 51 Applying the words of the test established in The Aramis [1989] 1 Lloyd’s Rep 213, 224, it was necessary to infer the continuing existence of the employment contract in order to give business reality to the relationship and arrangements between Mr Muscat and Cable & Wireless. There was no other possible explanation for what they were doing...

== See also ==
- UK labour law
