= 1853 in the United Kingdom =

Events from the year 1853 in the United Kingdom.

== Incumbents ==
- Monarch – Victoria
- Prime Minister – George Hamilton-Gordon, 4th Earl of Aberdeen (Coalition)

== Events ==
- 20 January – The United Kingdom annexes Lower Burma ending the Second Anglo-Burmese War.
- 4 February – Halifax Permanent Benefit Building Society takes its first deposits.
- 14 February – United Kingdom Alliance for the Suppression of the Traffic in all Intoxicating Liquors formed in Manchester.
- 15 February – PS Queen Victoria sinks in a snowstorm at night entering Dublin Bay with the loss of more than 80 lives.
- 18 February – A treaty is signed with the United States concerning international copyright.
- 29 March – Manchester is granted city status by letters patent.
- May – The world's first public aquarium is opened in London Zoo.
- 5 May – Perpetual Maritime Truce comes into force between the United Kingdom and the rulers of the Sheikhdoms of the Lower Gulf, later known as the Trucial States.
- 6 June – Naval fleet travels to Besika Bay to fend off Russian threats to the Ottoman Empire.
- 25 June – Hochster v De La Tour, a landmark case on anticipatory breach of contract in English contract law, is decided in the Court of Queen's Bench.
- 1 July – First constitution of the Cape Colony provides for a legislative council.
- 1 August – Under terms of the Vaccination Act 1853, all children born after this date are to receive compulsory vaccination against smallpox during their first 3 months of life, with defaulting parents subject to a fine.
- 12 August – Licensing (Scotland) Act (known after its sponsor as the 'Forbes Mackenzie Act') regulates the supply of intoxicating beverages in Scotland.
- 20 August
  - Penal Servitude Act provides for convicted criminals to serve their entire sentence in prison, rather than suffer transportation, and also to be freed on licence.
  - Betting Act (An Act for the Suppression of Betting Houses) prohibits betting shops, restricting legal betting on horse racing to racecourses.
- September (approx.) – First pillar box on the British mainland erected in Carlisle.
- 14 September – West Australian becomes the first horse to win the English Triple Crown by finishing first in the Epsom Derby, 2,000 Guineas and St Leger.
- 28 September – Emigrant ship Annie Jane sinks in heavy seas off the Scottish island of Vatersay with the loss of 350 lives.
- 31 October–15 May 1854 – Lockout of Preston cotton mill workers seeking reinstatement of ten percent of their pay, this will be Britain's longest industrial dispute up to this date.
- 3 December – Crimean War: a protocol is signed with France, Austria, and Prussia for restoring peace between Russia and Turkey.
- 14 December – Palmerston resigns as Home Secretary over demands for parliamentary reform, but changes his mind on 23 December.
- 15 December – The Sierra redwood Sequoiadendron giganteum is introduced to England as Wellingtonia by William Lobb.

=== Undated ===
- Highland Clearances in Skye and Raasay.
- J. S. Fry & Sons of Bristol produce their Cream Stick, predecessor of Fry's Chocolate Cream and the first mass produced chocolate bar.

== Publications ==
- Charlotte Brontë's novel Villette (published as by Currer Bell).
- Mrs Gaskell's novel Ruth.
- John Mason Neale and Thomas Helmore's adaptations Carols for Christmas-Tide, including the first appearance of "Good King Wenceslas".
- Robert Smith Surtees' comic novel Mr. Sponge's Sporting Tour.
- Charlotte M. Yonge's novel The Heir of Redclyffe.

== Births ==
- 15 January – Rutland Barrington, baritone in musical comedy (died 1922)
- 16 January
  - Johnston Forbes-Robertson, actor (died 1937)
  - Ian Hamilton, general (died 1947)
- 29 March – Elihu Thomson, electrical engineer and inventor (died 1937)
- 7 April – Prince Leopold, Duke of Albany, member of the royal family (died 1884)
- 3 June – Flinders Petrie, Egyptologist (died 1942)
- 4 July – George Edward Bond, Medway architect and surveyor (died 1914)
- 5 July – Cecil Rhodes, businessman (died 1902)

== Deaths ==
- 27 January – John Iltyd Nicholl, Welsh politician (born 1797)
- 12 April – James Foster, ironmaster (born 1786)
- 15 August – Frederick William Robertson, Anglican preacher (born 1816)
- 19 August – Sir George Cockburn, Naval commander (born 1772)
- 29 August – Sir Charles James Napier, general and Commander-in-Chief in India (born 1782)
- 6 September – George Bradshaw, cartographer and timetable publisher (born 1800)
