= Simpkins v Pays =

English case law on intention to create legal relations

Simpkins v Pays [1955] 1 WLR 975 is a precedent case concerned with the intention to create legal relations under the English law of contract, decided at Chester Assizes in 1955.

== Background ==
The case involved an informal syndicate agreement between a grandmother, grand-daughter and a lodger. The three ladies regularly entered a fashion competition in the "Sunday Empire News" where 8 types of fashion attire were ranked. For a period of 7 to 8 weeks, the plaintiff lodger, the defendant grandmother, and the grand-daughter each contributed one forecast on the coupon.

The coupon in question was filled in by the lodger but was made out in the grandmother's name. The costs of postage and the 30-shilling entry fee were informally shared, being sometimes paid by one and sometimes by another. When the question of sharing winnings first came to be considered between the lodger and grandmother, the latter said that they would "go shares".

The coupon sent in for June 1954 was successful, but the grandmother refused to pay a third of the £750 prize money to the lodger, claiming that the arrangement to share any winnings was reached in a family association and was not intended to give rise to legal consequences, and that accordingly, there was no contract.

== Decision ==
Sellers J said that the grandmother was required to give one-third of the winnings to the lodger. The judge, applying the objective test, said that the informal agreement between the parties was binding and that the facts showed a "mutuality" between the parties, adding:

If my conclusion that there was an arrangement to share any prize money is not correct, the alternative position to that of these three persons competing together as a "syndicate", as counsel for the plaintiff put it, would mean that the plaintiff, despite her propensity for having a gamble, suddenly abandoned all her interest in the competition in the Sunday Empire News. I think that that is most improbable ... .

Sellers J added that, semble, the grand-daughter also would be entitled to as one-third share (even though she was not a party to the case, nor had she claimed against her grandmother).

== Significance ==
This case shows that in social agreements the presumption that parties do not want to enter a legal relationship can be rebutted. Although many sources treat "social and domestic agreements" as a single category, it is better to regard "family agreements" as a class separate from "social agreements", as the latter invokes no presumption, and only the objective test applies.

== See also ==
- Connell v MIB
- Welch v Jess
