= Zero Carbon Displacement =

Zero Carbon Displacement is a unique measure of an organisation's carbon footprint which can be achieved when an organisation uses carbon-free energy which produces zero carbon emissions.

Zero Carbon Displacement is distinguished from other markers of environmental sustainability. A study by Stanford University (2019) revealed that companies that claim to use ‘100% renewable energy’ often underestimate their greenhouse gas emissions. Accordingly, to claim Zero Carbon Displacement a business must be willing to provide hourly accounting of its energy sources instead of annual reporting. Crypto mining has pushed up demand for environment-friendly energy sources. Currently, 39% of all energy used for crypto mining is renewable. Zero Carbon Displacement requires strict analysis of an entire grid ecosystem to make sure that no additional fossil fuel based energy is being forced into use before it can be claimed. Once Zero Carbon Displacement is achieved a crypto miner or data processor associated with the blockchain can legitimately claim Zero Carbon Displacement. Under Zero Carbon Displacement power use must be drawn from grids which are > 99% renewable source or from newly installed renewable power supply through direct feed in a closed loop with no fossil fuel back up for operations.

The concept of Zero Carbon Displacement was first used by the Norwegian People's Think Tank on 16 August 2021 in response to a post on Medium by ariNO.CTT entitled "I care about the environment as much as you do."
