= Welch v Jess =

- Court: District Court of New Zealand
- Full case name: Welch v Jess
- Citation: [1976] NZ Recent Law 185

Welch v Jess [1976] NZ recent Law 185 is a reported precedent case in New Zealand on intention to create legal relations in the law of contract.

It adopts into NZ case law the English cases of Simpkins v Pays and Connell v MIB.

== The case ==
Jess and his friend Welch entered a fishing contest on Ninety Mile Beach. They agreed to pool money for a kitty, agreeing to share any prize money later won. Jess subsequently won $6,000 but later refused to share the prize money, claiming that it was merely a social agreement not intended to be enforced the parties.

- The court ruled that there was a legally binding contract, and Jess was ordered to share the prize money. The court declared that although social agreements are generally not legally enforceable, they can be legally enforceable under certain circumstances. In this case, the objective bystander would have thought that, having pooled the entrance fee, it was obvious that any winnings were intended to be shared.

== Commentary ==
For an agreement to become a contract, there must be intention to create legal relations. Two judicial devices aid a court to decide whether there is intent:

- the objective test, &
- the rebuttable presumption.

The objective test was established in Carlill v Carbolic Smoke Ball Co, where it was held that any reasonable man who read an advertisement that said the advertiser had "deposited £1000 in the Alliance Bank to show our sincerity in the matter" would deem that there was intention to create legally relations (even though, subjectively, the advertiser was a rogue who had no intention of honouring the agreement).

The rebuttable presumption varies according to the type of transaction.

- In a commercial context, it is presumed that parties have intention to create legal relations.
- Family agreements are presumed not to be binding, unless it is obvious that a contract was intended.
- Although many authors deem that "social agreements" are the same as family agreements, Simpkins v Pays and Connell v MIB show that this is NOT the case; in agreements between friends there is effectively no presumption, and the objective test is paramount.
