= Pitt v PHH Asset Management Ltd =

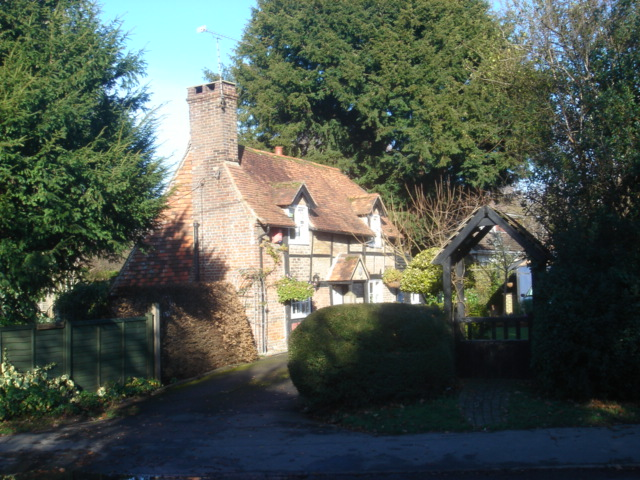
- Court: Court of Appeal
- Decided: 29 June 1993
- Citations: [1994] 1 WLR 327; [1993] 4 All ER 961; Times, 30 July 1993; Independent, 6 August 1993; Guardian, 13 August 1993

Court membership
- Judges sitting: Sir Thomas Bingham MR, Mann LJ and Peter Gibson LJ

Keywords
- lockout agreement, contract for sale of land

Pitt v PHH Asset Management Ltd [1994] 1 WLR 327 is an English contract law case, which confirmed the enforceability of lockout agreements.

== Facts ==
In Parsonage Lane, Chelsworth, Suffolk, is a residence known as "The Cottage". PHH Asset Management Ltd were undisclosed agents of mortgagees, who were selling The Cottage for £205,000. Mr Pitt and Miss Buckle put in competing bids. Mr Pitt bid £200,000, which PHH accepted 'subject to contract'. Miss Buckle then increased her bid to £210,000. PHH withdrew its acceptance of Mr Pitt.

Mr Pitt was invited to increase his offer but declined as he didn't want to enter a bidding war. The sales agent subsequently invited the two parties to submit sealed bids to which Mr Pitt agreed provided were he to submit the successful bid then the vendor would not consider further offers. This is known as a "lock-out agreement" with Mr Pitt ready, willing and able to proceed to completion of the purchase within a 2-week period on receipt of the draft contract. Mr Pitt submitted the highest of the sealed bids and believed PHH Asset Management Ltd on behalf of the vendor were contractually committed to sell to him. Miss Buckle subsequently increased her offer which the vendor accepted. Mr Pitt withdrew from the process as he believed the vendor had reneged on the agreement, the "lock-out agreement" and took legal action to recover his costs.

== Judgment ==
Peter Gibson LJ held there was a consideration. First, Mr Pitt had agreed to not apply for an injunction. Even though the claim may not have worked, PHH was freed from the 'nuisance value' of defending the claim. Second, he had agreed not to make a nuisance with Miss Buckle. Third, the promise to proceed within two weeks was considered. Mann LJ agreed and Sir Thomas Bingham MR gave the following judgment.

For very many people their first and closest contact with the law is when they come to buy or sell a house. They frequently find it a profoundly depressing and frustrating experience. The vendor puts his house on the market. He receives an offer which is probably less than his asking price. He agonises over whether to accept or hold out for more. He decides to accept, perhaps after negotiating some increase. A deal is struck. Hands are shaken. The vendor celebrates, relaxes, makes plans for his own move and takes his house off the market. Then he hears that the purchaser who was formerly pleading with him to accept his offer has decided not to proceed. No explanation is given, no apology made. The vendor has to embark on the whole dreary process of putting his house on the market all over again.

For the purchaser the process is, if anything, worse. After a series of futile visits to unsuitable houses he eventually finds the house of his dreams. He makes an offer, perhaps at the asking price, perhaps at what the agent tells him the vendor is likely to accept. The offer is accepted. A deal is done. The purchaser instructs solicitors to act. He perhaps commissions an architect to plan alterations. He makes arrangements to borrow money. He puts his own house on the market. He makes arrangements to move. He then learns that the vendor has decided to sell to someone else, perhaps for the price already offered and accepted, perhaps for an increased price achieved by a covert, unofficial auction. Again, no explanation, no apology. The vendor is able to indulge his self-interest, even his whims, without exposing himself to any legal penalty.

The reasons why purchaser and vendor can act in this apparently unprincipled manner are to be found in two legal rules of long standing: first, the rule that contracts for the sale and purchase of land must be evidenced (or now made) in writing; secondly, the rule that terms agreed subject to contract do not give rise to a binding contract. These rules are deeply imbedded in statute and authority. They make possible the behaviour I have described, but the validity and merits of those rules are not, and could not be, the subject of challenge in this appeal.

For the purchaser there is, however, one means of protection: to make an independent agreement by which the vendor agrees for a clear specified period not to deal with anyone other than that purchaser. The effect is to give that purchaser a clear run for the period in question. The vendor does not agree to sell to that purchaser, such an agreement would be covered by section 2 of the Act of 1989, but he does give a negative undertaking that he will not for the given period deal with anyone else. That, I am quite satisfied, is what happened here, as the judge rightly held. The vendor and the prospective purchaser made what has come to be called a "lock-out agreement". That was a contract binding on them both. The vendor broke it. He is liable to the prospective purchaser for damages which remain to be assessed. I would dismiss the appeal.

== See also ==
- Law of Property (Miscellaneous Provisions) Act 1989 s 2
