= R (Ullah) v Special Adjudicator =

Regina v. Special Adjudicator ex parte Ullah, also known as Do v. Secretary of State for the Home Department [2004] UKHL 26 on appeal from [2002] EWCA Civ 1856, was a legal case in the United Kingdom. This was a joint decision, meaning two cases were heard at the same time, so the case may be cited as either of the case titles.

== Decision ==
This was a decision of the House of Lords, composed of Lord Bingham of Cornhill, Lord Steyn, Lord Walker of Gestingthorpe, Baroness Hale of Richmond and Lord Carswell. The decision was made on Thursday 17 June 2004.

The issue in the case was whether a person can be deported from the United Kingdom to a state where there are known human rights abuses, or refused asylum to the United Kingdom when the applicant is from such a state.

The appellants in the cases, Mr Ullah and Miss Do, wished to rely on an Article of the European Convention on Human Rights other than Article 3 (no body shall be subjected to torture or inhuman or degrading treatment or punishment). The Appellants wished to rely on Article 9 of the Convention, guaranteeing the right to freedom, thought and conscience. At first instance and in the Court of Appeal the Appellants' submissions were rejected and it was held that deporting a person to a country which violated Article 9 would not amount to a violation of Article 3 of the Convention, and thus an applicant could be deported to the state in violation of Article 9.

Particular notice should be drawn to Paragraph 4-6 of the judgment of Lord Bingham. Here it is stated (using the judgment of the Court of Appeal, [2002] EWCA Civ 1856, as authority) that the Appellants, in order to rely on Article 9, would have to prove that the interference with Convention Rights was 'flagrant'. In the present case it was decided that the interference was not flagrant (see Paragraph 69-70 of the judgment by Lord Carswell for a brief discussion of the term 'flagrant'), which is why the appeal was dismissed in all courts.

Lord Walker and Baroness Hale delivered concurring judgments.

== Constitutional significance ==
As stated, Bingham's judgment is significant in establishing (as the "Ullah principle") conditions on the applicability of judgments from the European Court of Human Rights. Bingham states that Section 2 of the Human Rights Act 1998 should be interpreted as stating that British courts "should, in the absence of some special circumstances, follow any clear and constant jurisprudence of the Strasbourg court".
