= The Aramis =

- Court: Court of Appeal of England and Wales
- Citation: [1989] 1 Lloyd’s Rep 213

Case opinions
- Bingham LJ

The Aramis was a cargo ship which gave its name to an English legal case concerned with the concept of an implied contract. Its legal principles have since been superseded by Equitable Life v Hyman and AG of Belize v Belize Telecom Ltd.

The case concerned the question whether a contract could be implied between the transferee of a bill of lading to whom the goods had been delivered and the carrier. Prior to the Carriage of Goods By Sea Act 1992, the implication of such a contract was necessary if the transferee and the carrier were to have rights enforceable between themselves in respect of, for example, damage to the goods or the payment of freight.

== Facts ==
The main facts of the case were as follows: (Note: Paul Todd comments that "the trial was conducted without oral evidence or full discovery, so ... the facts found were rather sparse".) the plaintiffs were consignees of a cargo of steel coils shipped from Japan to Rotterdam under a bill of lading issued by the defendants, who were shipowners. The bill of lading incorporated the Hague Rules and provided for English law and jurisdiction. The plaintiffs paid for the goods and received an endorsement of the bill of lading from their bank. The defendants delivered the goods to the plaintiffs at Rotterdam without production of the bill of lading and without obtaining a receipt or any other document. The goods were damaged, and the plaintiffs claimed against the defendants for breach of contract and/or negligence.

The main issue was whether there was an implied contract between the plaintiffs and the defendants on the terms of the bill of lading. The defendants argued that there was no such contract because there was no offer and acceptance, no consideration, no intention to create legal relations, and no necessity to imply a contract. The plaintiffs argued that there was an implied contract because it was necessary to give business efficacy to the transaction and to reflect the reasonable expectations of the parties.

The implication of a contract between a transferee of a bill of lading and a carrier was based on a doctrine known as Brandt v Liverpool, after a case decided in 1924. According to this doctrine, when a carrier delivers goods to a person who presents a bill of lading endorsed by or on behalf of the shipper, there is an implied contract between them on the terms of the bill of lading, unless there is evidence to show that they intended otherwise. This doctrine was developed to overcome the difficulties faced by transferees who could not sue on the original contract of carriage under the Bills of Lading Act 1855.

== Judgment ==
Bingham LJ considered the authorities at some length to see how the implication of contracts in this field had grown and developed. He cited with approval the judgment of May LJ in the Elli which said,

As the question whether or not any such contract is to be implied is one of fact, its answer must depend upon the circumstances of each particular case - and the different sets of facts which arise for consideration in these cases are legion. However, I also agree that no such contract should be implied on the facts of any given case unless it is necessary to do so: necessary, that is to say, in order to give business reality to a transaction and to create enforceable obligations between parties who are dealing with one another in circumstances in which one would expect that business reality and those enforceable obligations to exist.

Bingham LJ then continued:

whether a contract is to be implied is a question of fact and that a contract will only be implied where it is necessary to do so… it would, in my view, be contrary to principle to countenance the implication of a contract from conduct if the conduct relied upon is no more consistent with an intention to contract than with an intention not to contract. It must, surely, be necessary to identify conduct referable to the contract contended for or, at the very least, conduct inconsistent with there being no contract made between the parties. Put another way, I think it must be fatal to the implication of a contract if the parties would or might have acted exactly as they did in the absence of a contract.

== See also ==
- Blackpool and Fylde Aero Club Ltd v Blackpool BC
- Baird Textile Holdings Ltd v Marks & Spencer plc [2001] EWCA Civ 274
- Attorney General of Belize v Belize Telecom Ltd
