= Jones v Padavatton =

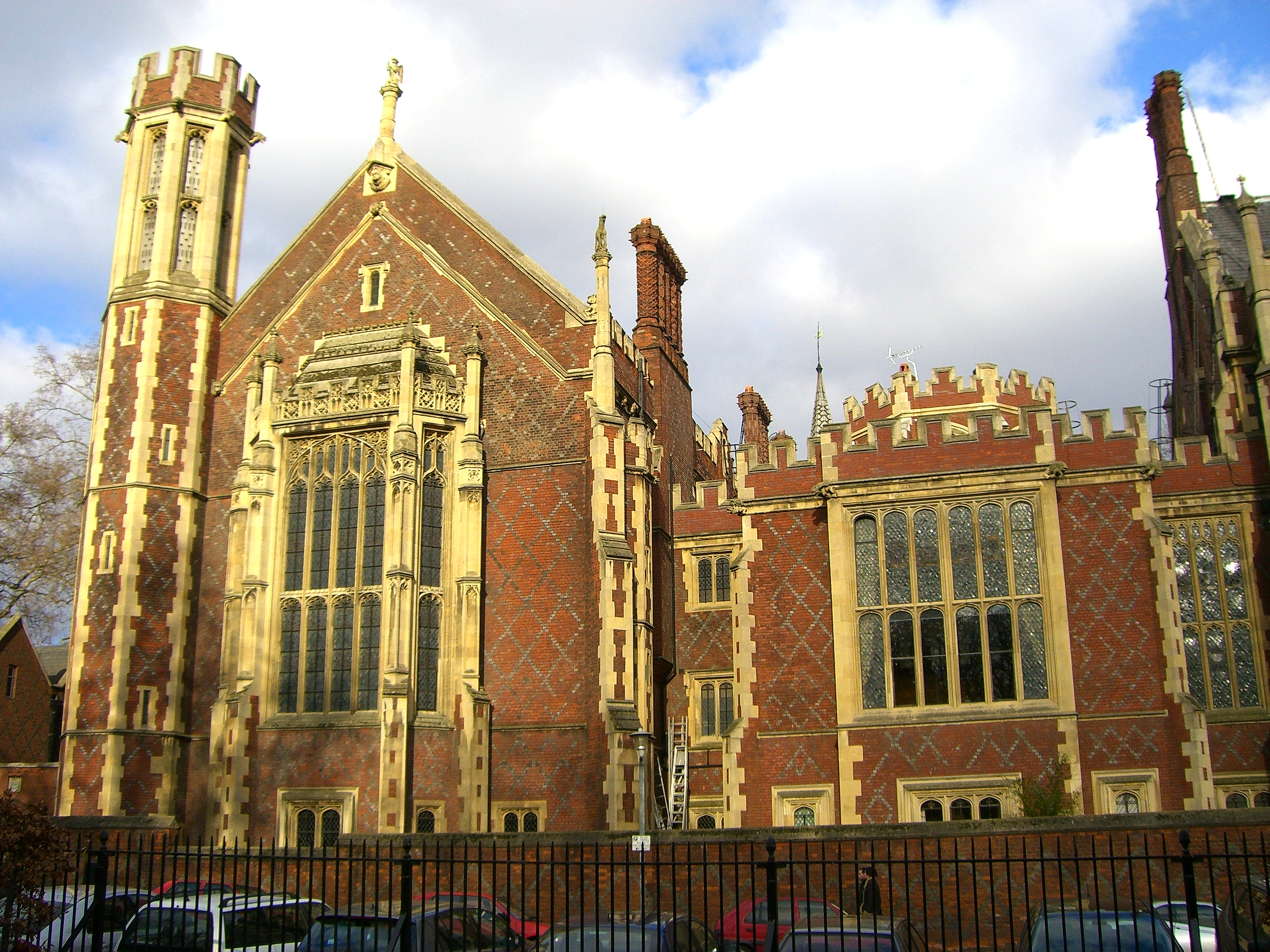
- Court: Court of Appeal
- Decided: 29 November 1968
- Citations: [1968] EWCA Civ 4, [1969] 1 WLR 328; All ER 616

Court membership
- Judges sitting: Lord Justice Danckwerts, Lord Justice Salmon, Lord Justice Fenton Atkinson

Keywords
- Creating legal relations, enforceability

Jones v Padavatton [1968] EWCA Civ 4 is a leading English decision on contract law. The decision demonstrates how domestic agreements, such as in between a mother and daughter, are presumed not to be legally binding unless there is clear intention.

== Facts ==
A mother, Mrs Violet Lalgee Jones, agreed with her daughter, Mrs Ruby Padavatton, that if she would give up her secretary job at the Indian embassy in Washington DC and study for the bar in England, the mother would pay maintenance (from Trinidad, East Indian descent). The mother gave monthly payments of 42 pounds and then bought a London house (the daughter moved out of a one-room flat in Acton to 181 Highbury Quadrant, Highbury) which she lived in and rented out. Then they had a quarrel while Mrs Padavatton was still completing her bar exams at Lincoln's Inn. The mother brought an action for possession of the house. The daughter argued there was a binding contract that she could stay.

== Judgment ==
The Court held that there was no binding contract. Although there would have been a contract if it was not the domestic parties related, there was insufficient evidence to rebut the presumption against domestic arrangements. Also, the Court of Appeal stated that the agreement would last until the daughter had passed her Bar finals; yet 5 years had elapsed and she had still not passed them, therefore the contract had elapsed.

== See also ==
- Intention to create legal relations
- Balfour v Balfour
- Merritt v Merritt
