= Merritt v Merritt =

1970 English contract law case

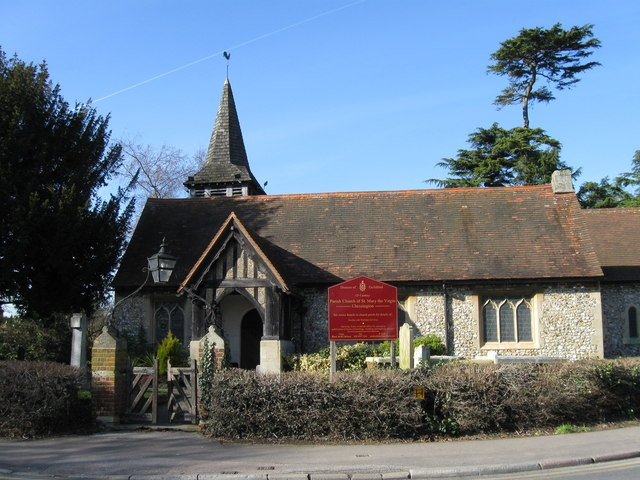
- St Mary's Church, Chessington
- Court: Court of Appeal
- Decided: 27 April 1970
- Citation: [1970] 1 WLR 1211

Keywords
- Creating legal relations, enforceability

Merritt v Merritt is a 1970 case in English contract law, on the matter of creating legal relations. While under the principles laid out in Balfour v Balfour, domestic agreements between spouses are rarely legally enforceable, this principle was rebutted where two spouses who formed an agreement over their matrimonial home were not on good terms.

== Background ==
Mr Merritt and his wife jointly owned a house. Mr Merritt left to live with another woman. They made an agreement (signed) that Mr Merritt would pay Mrs Merritt a £40 monthly sum, and eventually transfer the house to her, if Mrs Merritt kept up the monthly mortgage payments. When the mortgage was paid Mr Merritt refused to transfer the house.

== Judgment ==
The Court of Appeal held that nature of the dealings, and the fact that the Merritts were separated when they signed their contract, allowed the court to assume that their agreement was more than a domestic arrangement. Lord Denning MR stated:

The husband and the wife were married as long ago as 1941. After the war, in 1949 they got a building plot and built a house. It was a freehold house, 133 Clayton Road, Hook, Chessington. It was in the husband’s name, with a considerable sum on mortgage with a building society. There they lived and brought up their three children, two daughters, now aged 20 and 17, and a boy now 14. The wife went out to work and contributed to the household expenses.

Early in 1966 they came to an agreement whereby the house was to be put in joint names. That was done. It reflected the legal position when a house is acquired by a husband and wife by financial contributions of each. But, unfortunately, about that time the husband formed an attachment for another woman. He left the house and went to live with her. The wife then pressed the husband for some arrangement to be made for the future. On 25 May, they talked it over in the husband’s car. The husband said that he would make the wife a monthly payment of £40 and told her that out of it she would have to make the outstanding payments to the building society. There was only £180 outstanding. He handed over the building society’s mortgage book to the wife. She was herself going out to work, earning net £7 10s a week. Before she left the car she insisted that he put down in writing a further agreement. It forms the subject of the present action. He wrote these words on a piece of paper:

In consideration of the fact that you will pay all charges in connection with the house at 133, Clayton Road, Chessington, Surrey, until such time as the mortgage repayment has been completed, when the mortgage has been completed I will agree to transfer the property in to your sole ownership. Signed. John B. Merritt 25.5.66.

The wife took that paper away with her. She did, in fact, over the ensuing months pay off the balance of the mortgage, partly, maybe, out of the money the husband gave her, £40 a month, and partly out of her own earnings. When the mortgage had been paid off, he reduced the £40 a month to £25 a month.

The wife asked the husband to transfer the house into her sole ownership. He refused to do so. She brought an action in the Chancery Division for a declaration that the house should belong to her and for an order that he should make the conveyance. The judge, Stamp J, made the order; but the husband now appeals to this court.

The first point taken on his behalf by counsel for the husband was that the agreement was not intended to create legal relations. It was, he says, a family arrangement such as was considered by the court in Balfour v Balfour and in Jones v Padavatton. So the wife could not sue on it. I do not think that those cases have any application here. The parties there were living together in amity. In such cases their domestic arrangements are ordinarily not intended to create legal relations. It is altogether different when the parties are not living in amity but are separated, or about to separate. They then bargain keenly. They do not rely on honourable understandings. They want everything cut and dried. It may safely be presumed that they intend to create legal relations.

Counsel for the husband then relied on the recent case of Gould v Gould, when the parties had separated, and the husband agreed to pay the wife £12 a week ‘so long as he could manage it’. The majority of the court thought that those words introduced such an element of uncertainty that the agreement was not intended to create legal relations. But for that element of uncertainty, I am sure that the majority would have held the agreement to be binding. They did not differ from the general proposition which I stated ([1969] 3 All ER at 730, [1970] 1 QB at 280):

When ... husband and wife, at arm’s length, decide to separate and the husband promises to pay a sum as maintenance to the wife during the separation, the court does, as a rule, impute to them an intention to create legal relations.

In all these cases the court does not try to discover the intention by looking into the minds of the parties. It looks at the situation in which they were placed and asks itself: would reasonable people regard the agreements as intended to be binding?

Counsel for the husband sought to say that this agreement was uncertain because of the arrangement for £40 a month maintenance. That is obviously untenable. Next he said that there was no consideration for the agreement. That point is no good. The wife paid the outstanding amount to the building society. That was ample consideration. It is true that the husband paid her £40 a month which she may have used to pay the building society. But still her act in paying was good consideration. Counsel for the husband took a small point about rates. There was nothing in it. The rates were adjusted fairly between the parties afterwards. Finally, counsel for the husband said that, under s 17 of the Married Women’s Property Act 1882, this house would be owned by the husband and the wife jointly; and that, even if this house were transferred to the wife, she should hold it on trust for them both jointly. There is nothing in this point either. The paper which the husband signed dealt with the beneficial ownership of the house. It was intended to belong entirely to the wife.

I find myself in entire agreement with the judgment of Stamp J. This appeal should be dismissed.

Widgery LJ and Karminski LJ concurred.

== See also ==
- English contract law
- Balfour v Balfour
- Creation of legal relations in English law
- Mechanisms of the English common law
