= Baird Textile Holdings Ltd v Marks & Spencer plc =

Baird Textile Holdings Ltd v Marks & Spencer plc.
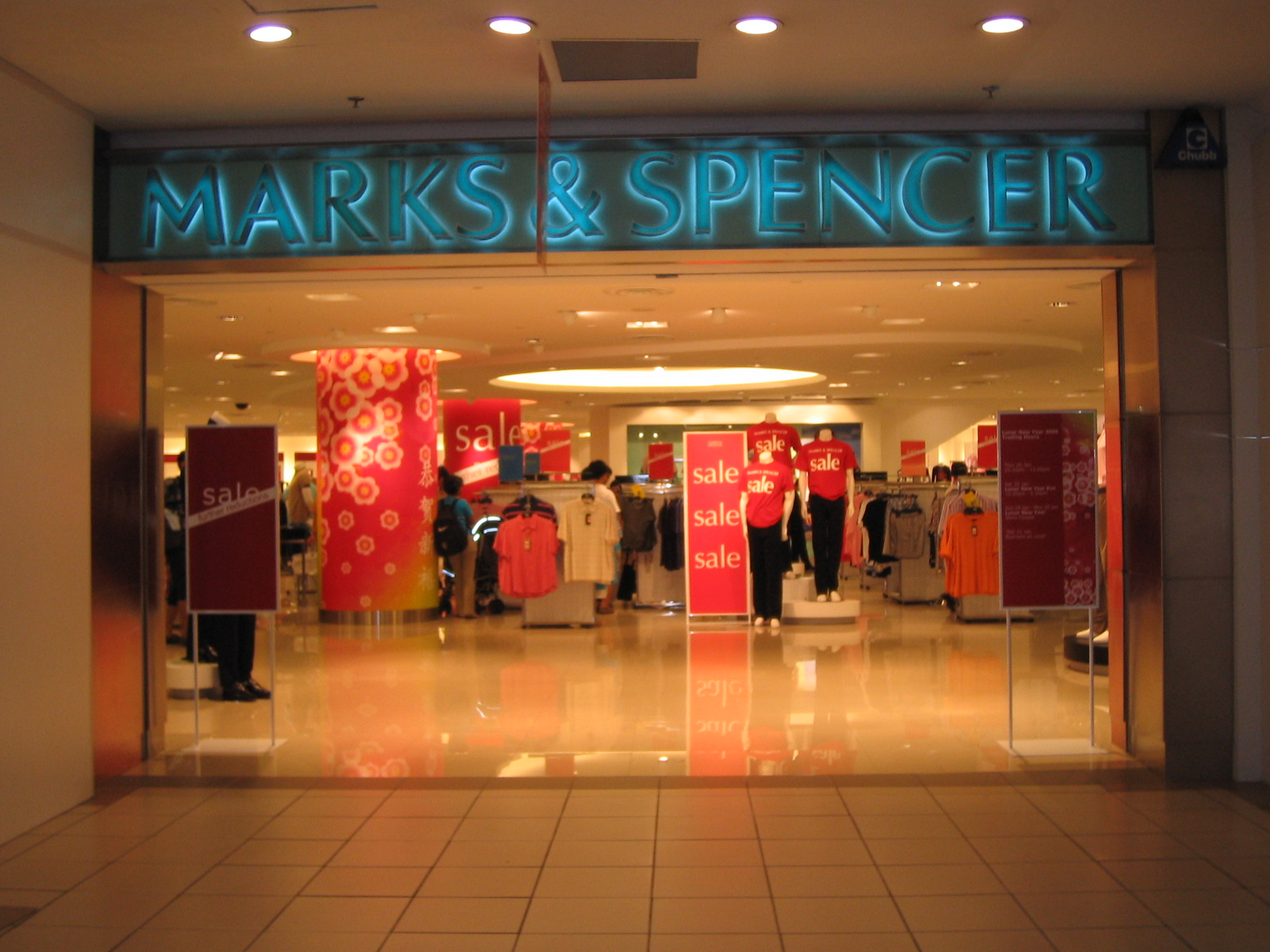
- Court: Court of Appeal
- Citation: [2001] EWCA Civ 274, [2002] 1 All ER (Comm) 737, [2001] CLC 999
- Transcript: Full text of judgment

Keywords
- intention to create legal relations, course of dealing

Baird Textile Holdings Ltd v Marks & Spencer plc [2001] EWCA Civ 274 is an English contract law case concerned with the possibility of an implied contract after a course of dealings between two businesses.

== Facts ==
Baird Textile Holdings Ltd. had supplied clothes to Marks & Spencer plc. (M&S) for thirty years. "Without warning", M&S said that they were terminating the arrangement. Baird sued M&S on the grounds that they should have been given reasonable notice. The problem was that there was no express contract under which such a term could be said to have arisen. Baird argued that a contract should be implied through the course of dealings. The judge at first hearing found there was no such contract, and Baird appealed to the Court of Appeal.

== Judgment ==
Sir Andrew Morritt V-C, with whom Judge LJ and Mance LJ concurred, found that a contract could not be implied unless it was necessary. Here, any such agreement to keep up the purchase of clothes, subject to reasonable notice for termination, would be too uncertain. Uncertainty was confirmed by an absence of intention to be legally bound. Furthermore, an argument of estoppel could not succeed because estoppel was not capable (in English law as yet) of creating its own cause of action. Also, concerning estoppel, Judge LJ held, "The interesting question... is whether equity can provide a remedy which cannot be provided by contract. It seems clear that the principles of the law of estoppel have not yet been fully developed...." He questioned estoppel and the applicability of equity.

Richard Field QC, Charles Bear and Herbert Smith acted for Baird, and Michael Brindle QC, Andrew Burrows and Freshfields Bruckhaus Deringer acted for M&S.

== See also ==
- The Aramis [1989] 1 Lloyd’s Rep 213, Bingham LJ
