= Tom Bingham, Baron Bingham of Cornhill =

British judge (1933–2010)

The Right Honourable The Lord Bingham of Cornhill KG PC QC FBA
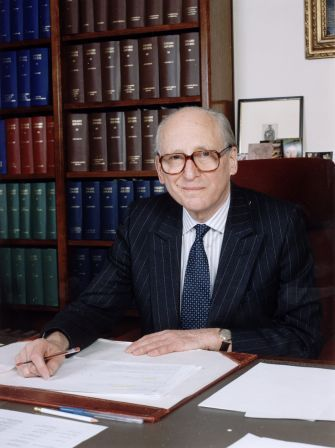
- Bingham in 2006

Senior Lord of Appeal in Ordinary
- In office 6 June 2000 – 30 September 2008
- Deputy: The Lord Slynn of Hadley; The Lord Nicholls of Birkenhead; The Lord Hoffmann
- Preceded by: The Lord Browne-Wilkinson
- Succeeded by: The Lord Phillips of Worth Matravers

Lord Chief Justice of England and Wales
- In office 4 June 1996 – 6 June 2000
- Nominated by: Lord Mackay
- Appointed by: Elizabeth II
- Preceded by: The Lord Taylor of Gosforth
- Succeeded by: The Lord Woolf

Master of the Rolls
- In office 1 October 1992 – 4 June 1996
- Preceded by: The Lord Donaldson of Lymington
- Succeeded by: The Lord Woolf

Member of the House of Lords
- Lord Temporal
- Life peerage 4 June 1996 – 11 September 2010

Personal details
- Born: 13 October 1933 Marylebone, London, England
- Died: 11 September 2010 (aged 76) Boughrood, Powys, UK
- Spouse: Elizabeth Loxley (Lady Bingham of Cornhill)
- Children: Kate Bingham; Harry Bingham; Kit Bingham
- Education: Balliol College, Oxford

Thomas Henry Bingham, Baron Bingham of Cornhill (13 October 1933 – 11 September 2010) was a British judge who was successively Master of the Rolls, Lord Chief Justice and Senior Lord of Appeal in Ordinary. On his death in 2010, he was described as the greatest judge of his generation. Baroness Hale of Richmond observed that his pioneering role in the formation of the United Kingdom Supreme Court may be his most important and long-lasting legacy. The Lord Phillips of Worth Matravers regarded Bingham as "one of the two great legal figures of my lifetime in the law" (the other figure, in context, being Lord Denning). Lord Hope of Craighead described Bingham as "the greatest jurist of our time".

After retiring from the judiciary in 2008, Bingham focused on teaching, writing, and lecturing on legal subjects, particularly the law of human rights. His book, The Rule of Law, was published in 2010 and he was posthumously awarded the 2011 Orwell Prize for literature. The British Institute of International and Comparative Law named the Bingham Centre for the Rule of Law in his honour.

== Early life ==
Bingham was born at Marylebone in London. His parents, Thomas Henry (1901–1981) and Catherine Bingham (née Watterson; 1903–1989), practised as doctors in Reigate, Surrey. His father was born in Belfast, a kinsman of the Earls of Lucan; his mother was from California before being raised on the Isle of Man.

He was educated at The Hawthorns prep school at Bletchingley, Surrey, where he was Head Boy, and then from 1947 the Cumbrian public school Sedbergh School (Winder House), where he was described as the "brightest boy in 100 years". He enjoyed history, took up fell-walking, and developed a strong attachment to the Church of England; he was a Head of House and a School Prefect. He won an open scholarship to Balliol College, Oxford, first undertaking National Service from 1952 to 1954, as a second lieutenant in the Royal Ulster Rifles serving in Hong Kong. He enjoyed his time in the Army and considered pursuing a military career before opting to serve in the Territorial Army for the next five years.

He went up to Oxford in 1954 and initially read Philosophy, Politics, and Economics, but after two terms switched to History. He was awarded one of the first William Coolidge Pathfinder Awards and spent the summer of 1955 in the US. He entered Gray's Inn during his second year at Oxford, with a view to becoming a barrister. He was elected President of Balliol Junior Common Room in his third year. He won the Gibbs Prize for Modern History in 1957 and was awarded first-class honours in finals. He also tried, unsuccessfully, for fellowship by examination at All Souls College. After graduation, he read for the Bar as Eldon Law Scholar and achieved a Certificate of Honour, coming top of Bar finals in 1959.

In 1963, he married Elizabeth Loxley, a Somerville graduate whose great-uncle was Major Gerald Loxley, of the Loxley family of Northcott Court, Hertfordshire; they had one daughter Catherine Elizabeth (born 1965), known as Kate, and two sons Thomas Henry (Harry, born 1967) and Christopher Toby (Kit, born 1969). Kate has been married since 1992 to Jesse Norman, then a Conservative government minister.

In 1965, Bingham and his wife Elizabeth acquired a cottage at Cornhill, near Boughrood in Powys; he died there in 2010.

== Early career ==
Bingham was called to the Bar by Gray's Inn, and was a pupil barrister under Judge Owen Stable QC in the chambers of Leslie Scarman at 2 Crown Office Row, which later moved to Fountain Court Chambers: within a few months, he was invited to become a tenant at the chambers. He took silk in 1972, becoming Queen's Counsel aged just 38 and the youngest that year, having served as Standing Counsel at the Department of Employment for four years from 1968. He was Counsel to the judicial inquiry into an explosion at a chemical plant at Flixborough in 1974 which killed 28 people. In 1977, when still at the Bar, he rose to public attention when he was appointed by the then-Foreign Secretary Dr. David Owen to head a public enquiry into alleged breaches of UN sanctions by oil companies in Rhodesia.

He was appointed a Recorder in 1975, and became a Bencher of Gray's Inn in 1978. He was promoted to High Court Judge of the Queen's Bench Division in April 1980, aged 46, and assigned to the Commercial Court, receiving the customary knighthood. He was further promoted to the Court of Appeal in 1986, joining the Privy Council. In 1991, he led a high-profile inquiry into the collapse of the Bank of Credit and Commerce International (BCCI).

== Senior judicial career ==
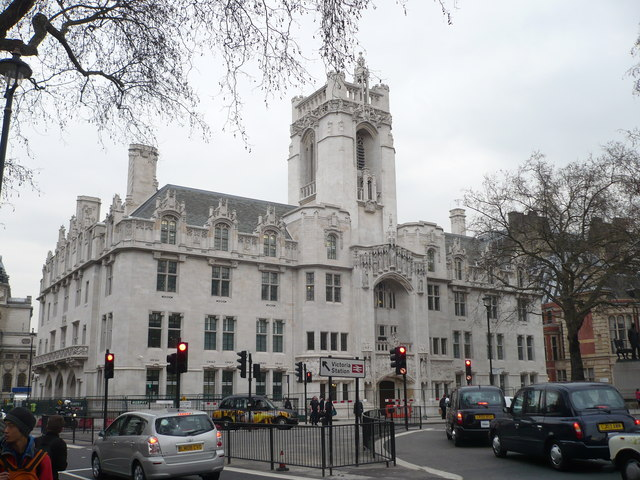
The Supreme Court of the United Kingdom in London the creation of which Bingham advocated before his retirement in 2008

Bingham succeeded Lord Donaldson as Master of the Rolls in 1992 and initiated significant reforms, including a move towards the replacement of certain oral hearings in major civil law cases. He was one of the first senior judges to give public support to incorporation of the European Convention on Human Rights into English law, which ultimately came about with the passing of the Human Rights Act 1998. Bingham was appointed Lord Chief Justice of England and Wales in 1996, following Lord Taylor. In England and Wales, he was the highest-ranking judge in regular courtroom service; he was personally responsible for adding "and Wales" to the title of the office.

He was created a life peer as Baron Bingham of Cornhill, of Boughrood in the County of Powys, on 4 June 1996. He continued as Lord Chief Justice until 2000 when he was appointed Senior Lord of Appeal in Ordinary. This position had customarily been held by the longest-serving Law Lord. Bingham was followed in the office of Lord Chief Justice by Lord Woolf, who had succeeded him as Master of the Rolls in 1996.

Bingham was a strong advocate of divorcing the judicial branch of the House of Lords from its legislative functions by setting up a new Supreme Court of the United Kingdom, which was accomplished under the Constitutional Reform Act 2005. The title of the office he held was redesignated as "President of the Supreme Court" upon that court's establishment in October 2009, after Bingham had retired in July 2008. He is understood to have been "very sorry" not to serve as its inaugural president. He would reach the mandatory retirement age for British judges on turning 75 on 13 October 2008.

Bingham oversaw an increasing workload of constitutional affairs after Scottish devolution, and human rights matters after the Human Rights Act came into force, and assembled the first nine-judge panels for important cases since 1910, including the Belmarsh Case in December 2004 which reviewed the regime for indefinite detention of foreign nationals suspected of involvement in terrorism who could not be deported due to the risk of torture in their home countries, holding that the regimes might breach the Human Rights Act.

Bingham was one of two Law Lords to dissent from the decision to overturn the High Court and Court of Appeal decisions to quash an Order-in-Council, dismissing all impediments to the rights of the Chagos Islanders to return home. Bingham also presided over various decisions of the Judicial Committee of the Privy Council upholding the finding that death penalties in Belize, St Lucia, St Kitts and the Bahamas were unconstitutional.

== Honours ==
Bingham was awarded the degree of Doctor of Civil Law honoris causa by the University of Oxford in 1994. From 2001 to 2008, Bingham held the office of High Steward of the University of Oxford, its second-highest office in the academic hierarchy, and in 2003 he came second to Chris Patten in the election for Chancellor. Bingham served as the Visitor of Balliol College, Oxford, from 1986 to 2010.

As Master of the Rolls, Bingham served on the Advisory Council on Public Records, the Magna Carta Trust, and the Royal Commission on Historical Manuscripts. He was a Trustee of the Pilgrim Trust for 15 years and an Honorary Fellow of the British Academy from 2003. In 2005, he was advanced from Knight Bachelor to the Garter, an honour in the personal gift of the Sovereign and seldom bestowed upon judges, being installed as a Knight Companion of the Garter with Lady Soames and Sir John Major. He also served as president and chairman of the British Institute of International and Comparative Law, which established in 2010 the Bingham Centre for the Rule of Law in his honour.

On 16 November 2006, Bingham delivered the sixth annual Sir David Williams Lecture, hosted by the Centre for Public Law at the Faculty of Law of the University of Cambridge; this lecture was entitled "The Rule of Law". On 17 January 2008, Bingham presented the annual Hansard Lecture at the University of Southampton. On 14 March 2008, Bingham received the degree of Doctor of Jurisprudence honoris causa from the University of Rome III, after delivering the Lectio Magistralis at the Faculty of Law entitled "The Rule of Law".

In 2009, Bingham became involved with Reprieve, a UK charity, as well as delivering the fourth annual Jan Grodecki Lecture at the University of Leicester, entitled The House of Lords: Its Future.

== Retirement ==
Bingham remained active in retirement. On 17 November 2008, in his first major speech since retiring as Senior Lord of Appeal in Ordinary, Bingham, addressing the British Institute of International and Comparative Law, disputed the legality of the 2003 invasion of Iraq by the United States, the United Kingdom and other countries. He said that the invasion and occupation of Iraq was "a serious violation of international law", and he accused Britain and the US of acting like a "world vigilante".

In June 2009, Bingham was interviewed by the British legal journalist Joshua Rozenberg on the subject of the rule of law in international affairs, an event arranged to raise awareness of the Bingham Centre for the Rule of Law at the British Institute of International and Comparative Law. Bingham's thoughts on this subject, in particular banning of certain weapons in international conflict, were covered by various newspapers The Independent ("Top judge: use of drones intolerable") and The Daily Telegraph ("Unmanned drones could be banned, says senior judge"). Bingham gave another interview concerning the rule of law and matters pertaining to the "British Constitution" with the charity, the Constitution Society.

His book, The Rule of Law, was published by Allen Lane in 2010; it won the 2011 Orwell Prize for Literature.

== Death ==
Diagnosed with lung cancer in 2009 (he was a non-smoker), Bingham died the following year, and is buried at St Cynog's Church at Boughrood in Powys, Wales. His memorial service was held at Westminster Abbey on 25 May 2011 with the Adamant New Orleans Brass Band playing When the Saints Go Marching In.

== Judgments ==
High Court

- Bank of Tokyo Ltd v Karoon [1987] AC 45n, piercing the corporate veil

Court of Appeal

- Attia v British Gas Plc [1988] QB 304, expanding the scope of psychiatric injury to relate to property
- Al-Kandari v JR Brown & Co [1988] QB 665, no duty of care owed by a solicitor to the client's adversary
- R v Secretary of State, ex parte Factortame Ltd (No 1) (22 March 1989) part of the Factortame saga establishing the principle of EU law supremacy where the UK has delegated sovereignty under the treaties
- Interfoto Picture Library Ltd v Stiletto Visual Programmes Ltd [1989] QB 433, the more onerous a contractual term the more candid notice must be to qualify as reasonable
- The Aramis [1989] 1 Lloyd’s Rep 213, the test for an implied contractual obligation is that it is necessary to reflect the business parties' expectations
- Blackpool & Fylde Aero Club v Blackpool Borough Council [1990] 1 WLR 1195, an implied contractual duty to consider tender offers arose on the facts to reflect the intentions objectively manifested by the parties
- Caparo Industries plc v Dickman [1990] 2 AC 605, the leading tort case on the duty of care

Court of Appeal (as the Master of the Rolls)

- Hyundai Merchant Marine Co Ltd v Gesuri Chartering Co Ltd or The Peonia [1991] 1 Lloyd’s Rep 100, damages for late delivery of shipping goods are the difference between the market and the charter rate
- Pitt v PHH Asset Management Ltd [1994] 1 WLR 327, lockout agreements are enforceable
- Ex Parte Unilever, an administrative law case concerning judicial review stating "the categories of unfairness are not closed, and precedent should act as a guide, not a cage"
- White Arrow Express Ltd v Lamey’s Distribution Ltd [1996] Trading Law Reports 69, remarks on non-pecuniary losses

House of Lords

- Lubbe v Cape Plc [2000] 1 WLR 1545, conflict of laws and sidestepping the corporate veil for tort victims
- Reynolds v Times Newspapers Ltd [2001] 2 AC 127, qualified privilege
- Director General of Fair Trading v First National Bank plc [2001] UKHL 52, test of good faith in unfair contract term cases (not breached here)
- Dextra Bank & Trust Company Limited v Bank of Jamaica [2002] UKPC 50
- Johnson v Gore Wood & Co [2002] 2 AC 1, on reflective loss and res judicata
- Fairchild v Glenhaven Funeral Services Ltd [2002] UKHL 22, material increase in risk test of causation for victims of asbestos related torts
- Transco plc v Stockport Metropolitan Borough Council [2003] UKHL 61, the firm affirmation of Rylands v Fletcher strict liability for nuisance in English law
- HIH Casualty and General Insurance Ltd v Chase Manhattan Bank [2003] UKHL 6, exclusion of liability for fraudulent misrepresentation in English law
- R v G [2003] UKHL 50, abolishing Caldwell recklessness
- Chester v Afshar [2004] UKHL 41, a patient's right to be fully informed about the risks involved in a medical procedure
- A and others v Secretary of State for the Home Department [2004] UKHL 56, illegality of indefinite detention
- Doe v Secretary of State for the Home Department [2004] UKHL 26, freedom of conscience
- R v Wang [2005] 1 WLR 661, [2005] UKHL 9, [2005] 1 All ER 782, [2005] 2 Cr App R 8, 'there are no circumstances in which a judge is entitled to direct a jury to return a verdict of guilty'
- R (Williamson) v Secretary of State for Education and Employment [2005] UKHL 15, "the means chosen to achieve this aim are appropriate and not disproportionate in their adverse impact on parents who believe that carefully-controlled administration of corporal punishment to a mild degree can be beneficial" [2005] UKHL 15
- Jackson v Attorney General [2005] UKHL 56, challenge to the fox hunting ban using the Parliament Acts 1911 and 1949
- R (Begum) v Governors of Denbigh High School [2006] UKHL 15, no right to wear any religious dress regardless of a well consulted school uniform policy
- Kay v Lambeth London Borough Council (2006), on evictions
- Golden Strait Corporation v Nippon Yusen Kubishka Kaisha [2007] UKHL 12, measure of damages for breach of contract
- R (Bancoult) v Secretary of State for Foreign and Commonwealth Affairs (No 2) [2008] UKHL 61
- R v Davis [2008] UKHL 36, anonymity of witness evidence
- R (Daly) v Secretary of State for the Home Department [2001] UKHL 26 "The infringement of prisoners' rights to maintain the confidentiality of their privileged legal correspondence is greater than is shown to be necessary to serve the legitimate public objectives already identified"

== Publications ==
- Bingham, Tom (2010). The Rule of Law. London New York: Allen Lane. ISBN 978-1-84614-090-7. OCLC 458734142 – via Internet Archive.

== Legacy ==
In 2010, shortly before Bingham died, the British Institute of International and Comparative Law established The Bingham Centre for the Rule of Law, a body solely dedicated to the promotion and enhancement of the rule of law worldwide.

In an interview on 7 February 2014, Nick Phillips, successor to Bingham as Senior Lord of Appeal in Ordinary, remarked that "...Tom Bingham was the most wonderful man; he was head and shoulders above everybody else in the Law, in my view...yes, just outstanding...his clarity of thought, his academic knowledge. I think almost everyone would say that he was, you know, the great lawyer of his generation."

== Arms ==
Coat of arms of Tom Bingham, Baron Bingham of Cornhill
Adopted 2006 (granted by the College of Arms) Coronet That of a Baron Crest A Griffin sejant erect Vert beaked and holding with both forefeet a Key wards upwards and outwards Or Escutcheon Per pale Or and Vert per chevron three Ears of Corn slipped and left all Counterchanged Supporters On either side a Running Duck that on the dexter Vert beaked and legged Or and that on the sinister Or beaked and legged Vert Motto PRO TANTO QUID RETRISUAMUS Orders Garter circlet: Honi soit qui mal y pense (Shame be to him who thinks evil of it) Badge A Running Duck Vert beaked and legged and grasping in the dexter foot a Key wards upwards and outwards Or Symbolism Bingham's arms pun the word "Cornhill", the per chevron formation suggesting a hill; the griffin alludes to Gray's Inn and is depicted holding a key as a play on his wife's maiden name of Loxley; the Bingham family keenly breed running ducks.

== See also ==
- Civil liberties in the United Kingdom
- English Law of Tort

== Notes ==
Legal offices
Preceded by John Donaldson, Baron Donaldson of Lymington	Master of the Rolls; 1992–1996	Succeeded by Harry Woolf, Baron Woolf
Preceded by Peter Taylor, Baron Taylor of Gosforth	Lord Chief Justice; 1996–2000	Succeeded by Harry Woolf, Baron Woolf
Preceded by Nick Browne-Wilkinson, Baron Browne-Wilkinson	Senior Lord of Appeal in Ordinary; 2000–2008	Succeeded by Nick Phillips, Baron Phillips of Worth Matravers
