= Intention to create legal relations =

Legal doctrine

Intention to create legal relations, otherwise an "intention to be legally bound", is a doctrine used in contract law, particularly English contract law and related common law jurisdictions. (Note: As in the New Zealand case of Welch v Jess.)

The doctrine establishes whether a court should presume that parties to an agreement wish it to be enforceable at law, and it states that an agreement is legally enforceable only if the parties are deemed to have intended it to be a binding contract.

== Identifying intention to create legal relations ==
A contract is a legally binding agreement. Once an offer has been accepted, there is an agreement, but not necessarily a contract. The element that converts any agreement into a true contract is "intention to create legal relations". There must be evidence that the parties intended the agreement to be subject to the law of contract. If evidence of intent is found, the agreement gives rise to legal obligations whereby any party in breach may be sued.

In English law, there are two judicial devices to help a court to decide whether there is intent: the earlier objective test, and the later rebuttable presumption. Both tests are used together in combination.

=== The objective test ===
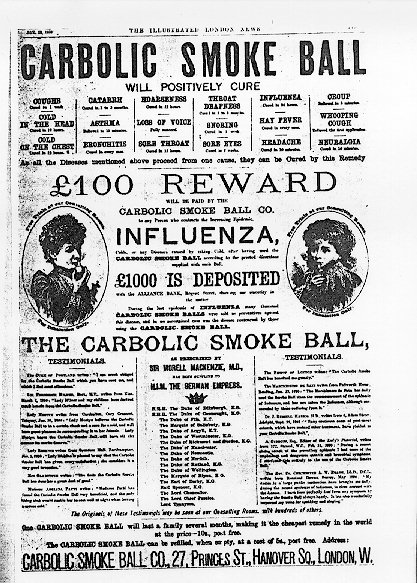
The reasonable man would deem that the promise of a reward was intended to be binding.

Counterintuitively, the best way of discovering whether the parties intended to contract is not to ask them, as this "subjective test" would give the rogue an easy loophole to escape liability. (He would reply, "No! I did not intend to be bound".) Instead, just as in Carlill v Carbolic Smoke Ball Company, the court applies the "objective test" and asks whether the reasonable bystander, after taking into account all the circumstances of the case, thinks that the parties intended to be bound. (Note: In Carlill, the contract was unilateral, with only one promise, so that only the company was bound.) Since the advertisement (pictured) stated that the company had "deposited £1,000 in the Alliance Bank to show sincerity in the matter", the court held that any objective bystander who read this would presume an intention to contract.

The context and circumstances of conversation between the purported contracting parties may be of great relevance in determining whether intention to create legal relations exists. For instance, agreements being "made in a highly informal and relaxed setting" or being "expressed in vague language" or being "made in anger or jest".

=== The rebuttable presumption ===
The rebuttable presumption establishes a burden of proof; but the burden may be rebutted by evidence to the contrary. The civil standard of proof is "a balance of probabilities", while the criminal standard of proof is "beyond reasonable doubt". Here, different presumptions will apply, according to the class of agreement. For these purposes, there are four classes of agreement:

- Family agreements: a presumption of no contract
- Social agreements (i.e. agreements between friends): no presumption (case decided on its merits, using the objective test)
- Commercial agreements: a presumption of a valid contract
- Collective agreements: a presumption of no contract

== The four classes ==
=== Family agreements ===
Family agreements are presumed not to give rise to legal relations unless there is clear evidence to the contrary. The courts will dismiss agreements which for policy reasons should not be legally enforceable.

In 1919, Lord Atkin held in Balfour v Balfour (where a husband promised his wife to pay maintenance while he worked in Ceylon) that there was no "intention to be legally bound", even though the wife was relying upon the payments. The judge stated that as a general rule, agreements between spouses would not be legally enforceable:

The matter really reduces itself to an absurdity when one considers it, because if we were to hold that there was a contract in this case we should have to hold that with regard to all the more or less trivial concerns of life where a wife, at the request of her husband, makes a promise to him, that is a promise which can be enforced in law.

In a more modern case, Jones v Padavatton, the court applied Balfour v Balfour and declared that a mother's promise to allow her daughter an allowance plus the use of a house provided that she left the USA to study for the English Bar was not an enforceable contract.

However, if there is clear intent to be contractually bound, the presumption is rebutted. In Merritt v Merritt, a separation agreement between estranged spouses was enforceable. In Beswick v Beswick an uncle's agreement to sell a coal delivery business to his nephew was enforceable. Also, in Errington v Errington, a father's promise to his son and daughter-in-law that they could live in (and ultimately own) a house if they paid off the balance of the mortgage, was an enforceable unilateral contract.

=== Social agreements ===
With social agreements, there is no presumption, the case being decided solely on its merits.

Although many sources consider "social and domestic agreements" to be a single class, it is better to regard "family agreements" as a class separate from "social agreements", as the latter invokes no presumption, and only the objective test applies.

In Simpkins v Pays, an informal agreement between a grandmother, granddaughter and a lodger to share competition winnings was binding. Sellers J held, applying the objective test, that the facts showed a "mutuality" between the parties, adding:

If my conclusion that there was an arrangement to share any prize money is not correct, the alternative position to that of these three persons competing together as a "syndicate", as counsel for the plaintiff put it, would mean that the plaintiff, despite her propensity for having a gamble, suddenly abandoned all her interest in the competition in the Sunday Empire News. I think that that is most improbable ...

In Coward v MIB, the Court of Appeal held that when a motorcyclist regularly gave a friend a pillion lift in return for some remuneration in cash or in-kind, there was no contract. (Note: The court had so decided presumably to prevent a finding of the bike being used "for hire or reward", beyond the scope of the "social, domestic and pleasure" policy.) Soon after, in Connell v MIB, a case with materially similar facts, Lord Denning (violating the rule that the Court of Appeal was bound by its own decisions) said, "I am not satisfied by the decision in Coward. I think that when one person regularly gives a lift to another in return for money, there is a contract, albeit informal". In a similar "lifts for friends case", Albert v MIB, the House of Lords approved Denning's decision in Connell (so that Coward may be considered bad law).

=== Commercial agreements ===
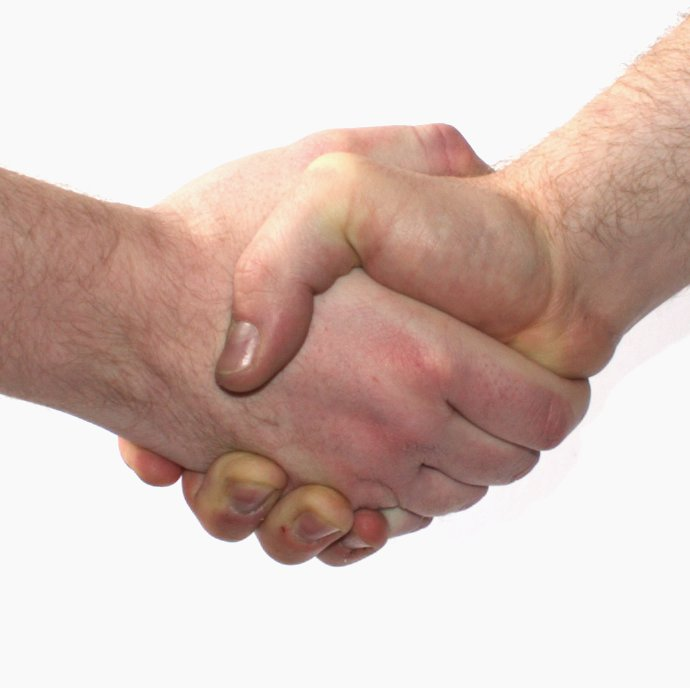
Business transactions are presumed to be binding contracts.

Business transactions incur a strong presumption of a valid contract: these agreements where the parties deal as though they were strangers, are presumed to be binding. However, "honour clauses" in "gentlemen's agreements" will be recognised as negating intention to create legal relations, as in Jones v Vernons Pools (where the clause "this agreement is binding in honour only" was effective). One must be careful not to draft a clause so as to attempt to exclude a court's jurisdiction, as the clause will be void, as in Baker v Jones. If a contract has both an "honour clause" and a clause that attempts to exclude a court's jurisdiction (as in Rose & Frank v Crompton) the court may apply the blue pencil rule, which strikes out the offending part. The court will then recognise the remainder, provided it still makes sense, and remains in accord with the parties' bargain. The offending clause was:

This arrangement is not entered into, nor is this memorandum written, as a formal or legal agreement, and shall not be subject to legal jurisdiction in the Law Courts either of the United States or England, but it is only a definite expression and record of the purpose and intention of the three parties concerned, to which they each honourably pledge themselves with the fullest confidence – based on past business with each other – that it will be carried through by each of the three parties with mutual loyalty and friendly co-operation.

When the words "and shall not be subject to legal jurisdiction in the Law Courts either of the United States or England," are "blue-pencilled out", the remainder becomes legally acceptable, while staying true to the intended meaning.

The party asserting an absence of legal relations must prove it; and any terms seeking to rebut the presumption must be clear and unambiguous. Where in Edwards v Skyways Ltd a bonus payment, described as 'ex gratia', was promised to an employee, this was found to be legally binding. He had relied upon the promise in accepting a redundancy package, and his employer could not adequately prove that they had not intended their promise to become a contractual term.

=== Collective agreements ===
A collective agreement is a special type of commercial agreement, such as one negotiated through collective bargaining between management and trade unions. At common law, Ford v Amalgamated Union of Engineering and Foundry Workers, the courts held that collective agreements were not binding. The Industrial Relations Act 1971, introduced by Robert Carr (employment minister in Edward Heath's cabinet), provided that collective agreements were binding, unless a contact clause in writing declared otherwise. After the demise of the Heath government, the law was reversed. The law is now contained in the Trade Union and Labour Relations (Consolidation) Act 1992 s.179:

"Any collective agreement made after the commencement of this section shall be conclusively presumed not to have been intended by the parties to be a legally enforceable contract, unless the agreement:

(a) is in writing, and
(b) contains a provision which states that the parties intend that the agreement shall be a legally enforceable contract".

== The civil law approach ==
In civil law systems, the concept of intention to create legal relations (Note: In Latin: animus contrahendi or obligandi) is closely related to the "will theory" of contracts as espoused by German jurist Friedrich Carl von Savigny in his nineteenth century work System des heutigen Römischen Rechts. It had been a prominent concept through the nineteenth century that contracts were based on a meeting of minds between two or more parties, and that their mutual consent to a bargain, or their intention to contract, were paramount. While it is generally true that courts wish to uphold the parties' intentions, courts moved in the later half of the nineteenth century to a more objective stance for interpretation, whereby the emphasis moved to the way in which the parties had manifested their consent to a bargain to the outside world. Given this change, it was still said that "intention to be legally bound" was a necessary element for a contract, but it came to reflect a policy about when to enforce agreements, as well as when not to.

== See also ==
- Rome I
- Rome II

== Relevant cases ==
- Baird Textile Holdings Ltd v Marks & Spencer plc [2002] 1 All ER (Comm.) 737
- Household Fire and Carriage Accident Insurance Co Ltd v Grant (1879) 4 Ex D 216

== Bibliography ==
- Chen-Wishart, Mindy (2007). Contract Law. Oxford University Press. ISBN 0-19-920716-X.
- Furmston, M. P.; Cheshire, Geoffrey; Simpson, Alfred; Fifoot, Cecil (2006). Cheshire, Fifoot and Furmston's Law of Contract. Oxford University Press. ISBN 0-19-928756-2.
- Halson, Roger (2001). Contract Law. Longman. ISBN 0-582-08647-7.
- Koffman, Laurence; Macdonald, Elizabeth (2007). The Law of Contract. Oxford University Press. ISBN 0-19-920715-1.
- Unger, J (1956). "Intent to Create Legal Relations, Mutuality and Consideration". The Modern Law Review. 19 (1). Blackwell Publishing.
