= Distinguishing =

Practice of the law courts

In law, to distinguish a case means a court decides whether the holding or legal reasoning of a precedent case will not apply due to materially different facts between the two cases or not. Two formal constraints constrain the later court: the expressed relevant factors (also known as considerations, tests, questions or determinants) in the ratio (legal reasoning) of the earlier case must be recited or their equivalent recited or the earlier case makes an exception for their application in the circumstances otherwise it envisages, and the ruling in the later case must not expressly doubt (criticise) the result reached in the precedent case.

The ruling made by the judge or panel of judges must be based on the evidence at hand and the standard binding authorities covering the subject-matter and areas of law cited in or plainly relevant to the dispute (they must be followed).

This means that a precedent will be dealt to (in English and Scottish law known instead as applied to) a case with similar facts, in which a decision can then be distinguished based upon this, or it may be cited with approval but found to be inapplicable on bases reconcilable with the earlier decision's reasoning.

== Wide and narrow distinguishment ==
Where a wide new class of distinguished cases is made, such as distinguishing all cases on privity of contract law in the establishment of the court-made tort of negligence or a case turns on too narrow a set of variations in facts ("turns on its own facts") compared to the routinely applicable precedent(s), such decisions are at high risk of being successfully overruled (by higher courts) on the bases respectively that:

1. The lower court has invented the law
2. The lower court has failed to follow a binding precedent

== Examples ==
Balfour v Balfour (1919) and Merritt v Merritt (1970) were cases involving the enforceability of maintenance agreements. In each case a wife sued her husband, alleging breach of contract. The judge in Balfour held the claim could not be sustained without evidence of intention to create legal regulations, so there was no legally binding contract. By contrast, in Merritt v Merritt, the judge distinguished Balfour v Balfour, deciding that the facts were materially different in that: (i) the husband and wife were separated and no longer "in amity"; and (ii) the agreement was made after they had separated, and in writing.

In Read v Lyons (1947), (where a munitions worker was injured in a factory explosion), the court distinguished Rylands v Fletcher (1868) because in the present case, even though the defendant factory kept "dangerous things on the land for a non-natural user", there was "no escape".

== Obiter followed ==
Where an obiter dictum (a non-binding statement based on hypothetical facts) is subsequent followed and adopted, then the later case is said to "approve" that obiter, and the earlier case may be marked "approved", "followed", or "obiter followed".

== See also ==
- Case law
- Opinion
- Precedent
  - Persuasive authority
  - Binding authority
