= John Stocker (judge) =

The Right Honourable Sir John Stocker MC TD

Lord Justice of Appeal
- In office 1986–1992

Justice of the High Court
- In office 1973–1986

Personal details
- Born: John Dexter Stocker

Sir John Dexter Stocker, MC, TD, PC (7 October 1918 – 27 December 1997) was a British judge. He was a Lord Justice of Appeal from 1986 until his retirement in 1992.

Born in Wimbledon, the son of a chartered accountant, Stocker was educated at Westminster School and the University of London, where he read Law. During the Second World War, he served with the Queen's Own Royal West Kent Regiment. He saw action at Dunkirk, El Alamein, and in Italy. He won the Military Cross at the Battle of Monte Cassino. He reached the rank of lieutenant-colonel.

Having intended to become a solicitor, he changed his mind and was called to the Bar by the Middle Temple in 1948. Becoming a Queen's Counsel in 1965, Stocker built a large common law practice, specialising in personal injury cases. He was counsel to the Widgery Tribunal.

Stocker was appointed to the High Court in 1973, receiving the customary knighthood. Assigned to the Queen's Bench Division, he was promoted to the Court of Appeal in 1986. He retired in 1992.
