= Gerald Loxley =

Major Gerald Loxley
- Born: 31 January 1885; Fairford, Gloucestershire, UK
- Died: 29 September 1950; Hereford, Herefordshire, UK
- Relatives: Earls of Stamford and Warrington
- Military career
- Allegiance: United Kingdom
- Branch: RNAS; Royal Air Force
- Service years: 1915–1920
- Rank: Major
- Conflicts: World War I
- Awards: Air Force Cross; Légion d'honneur Corona d'Italia
- Other work: United Nations

Loxley arms

Major Gerald Herbert Loxley AFC (1885–1950) was a decorated British aviator of the First World War deployed in military intelligence, before serving with the United Nations in Switzerland.

== Biography ==
Born on 31 January 1885 at Fairford, Gloucestershire, a vicar's son, he was named after his godfather, Sir Herbert Brewer.

Loxley attended Summer Fields School and Malvern College before studying jurisprudence at Oriel College, Oxford.

His World War I service in the Royal Naval Air Service saw action as an air pilot before being appointed to a distinguished position in aerial reconnaissance, advising the Director-General of Aircraft Production (Ministry of Munitions) in Paris. He was promoted to the rank of major upon the creation of the Royal Air Force in 1919.

Later in life Loxley served as a diplomat at the United Nations Organization at Geneva.

=== Family ===
The 5th child and 4th son of the Revd Canon Arthur Smart Loxley, son of John Loxley of Norcott Court, a manor house at Northchurch in Hertfordshire, he was the only one of the Loxley brothers to survive World War I. In 1930 he married Alice Blundell Booth (died 1955, leaving no children), a cousin of the Booth baronets. Through Julia Maria Heath a collateral ancestor of his was the poet Lord Byron; and, with Cornish ancestry, his family was also closely related to Lord Dover and the Duncombes.

After suffering a severe stroke, Loxley died on 29 September 1950 at St Mary's Hospital, Burghill, near Hereford.

== Honours and awards ==
Loxley received the Air Force Cross and was invested as a knight of the Legion of Honour by Ferdinand Foch in 1919, having previously been appointed an officer of the Order of the Crown of Italy in 1916.

He received many other military honours as well as being admitted as a freeman of the City of London "for war services".

== See also ==
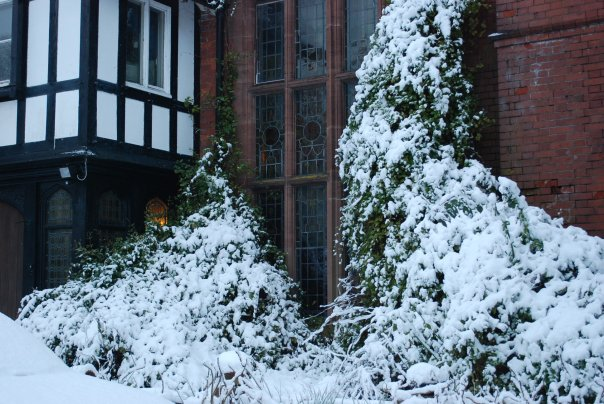
Norcott Court, Hertfordshire, the Loxley family ancestral home

- Baron Bingham of Cornhill
