= The Santa Clara =

Santa Clara University student newspaper

- Type: Weekly student newspaper
- Format: Tabloid
- Owner(s): Santa Clara University
- Publisher: Santa Clara University Board of Trustees
- Editor: Samantha Stahl
- Managing editor: Rhiannon Briggs
- Founded: February 22, 1922
- Language: English
- Headquarters: 500 El Camino Real; Santa Clara CA 95053-3190; United States
- Circulation: 1,000
- Website: thesantaclara.org

The Santa Clara is Santa Clara University's weekly student newspaper. It publishes online every week and distributes 1,000 free in-print copies every third Friday during the academic year. The newspaper was founded under the same name on February 22, 1922.

Notable past staffers of The Santa Clara include Dee Dee Myers, President Bill Clinton's press secretary and former Department of Homeland Security Secretary Janet Napolitano.

== Awards ==
The newspaper has received numerous awards for excellence, including the Associated Collegiate Press's Pacemaker prize in 2004 and 1995. The paper's website won the online version of the prize in 2006.

== See also ==
- List of student newspapers
