= Plate v Durst =

Plate v. Durst, 42 W.Va. 63, 66–67, 24 S.E. 580, 581, 32 LRA 404 (1896) is a leading case in the law of contracts in the United States.

The defendant promised the plaintiff $1000 and a diamond ring if she remained his domestic servant for 10 years. The defendant fulfilled that condition, but then the plaintiff claimed the promise was only in jest. The court held that there was a valid contract:

"Jokes are sometimes taken seriously... if such is the case, and thereby the person deceived is led to give valuable services in the full belief and expectation that the joker is in earnest, the law will also take the joker at his word, and give him good reason to smile."
