= Vitol SA v Norelf Ltd =

Vitol SA v. Norelf Ltd, The Santa Clara [1996] A.C. 800; [1996] 3 W.L.R. 105; [1996] 3 All E.R. 193, is an English contract law case about the effect of non-performance in accepting a contracting partner's repudiatory breach of contract.

== Facts ==
Norelf Ltd contracted to sell a cargo of propane to Vitol SA in 1991. The propane market had been very volatile. The cargo was being shipped (on the Santa Clara) from Houston, U.S. It was meant to leave before March 7. On March 8, while it was still being loaded, Vitol sent a telex to Norelf saying it did not wish the contract to continue because it was not going to arrive on time (i.e. Vitol repudiated the contract). The ship was loaded, and it sailed on March 9. The price of the cargo fell. Neither side did anything further to perform the contract. Norelf sold the cargo at a loss, and then claimed damages ($950,000) from Vitol for breach of contract.

The arbitrator held that Vitol's telex was an anticipatory breach of contract, but Norelf's failure to take further steps to perform the contract was sufficient communication to Vitol that they had accepted the repudiation. Vitol's appeal was dismissed in the High Court by Phillips J. But it succeeded in the Court of Appeal, who held that a mere failure to perform contractual obligations could not constitute acceptance of the repudiation. Norelf appealed to the House of Lords.

== Judgment ==
Lord Steyn (with whom Lord Mackay of Clashfern, L.C., Lord Griffiths, Lord Nolan and Lord Hoffmann concurred) allowed Norelf's appeal.

In some circumstances an innocent party may simply fail to perform his obligations under a repudiated contract, and that was enough to accept the repudiation. So communication (orally or written) was not always necessary. The question was whether the innocent party's conduct did convey, unequivocally, that he was treating the contract as repudiated. A failure could be unequivocal.

Because Norelf was the respondent, in a defensive position, the Court of Appeal had been wrong to say that Norelf required to seek a certificate under the Arbitration Act 1979, s.1(7) before being allowed to argue that the award was sustainable on alternative grounds.

Lord Steyn read the following.

My Lords, the question of law before the House does not call for yet another general re-examination of the principles governing an anticipatory breach of a contract and the acceptance of the breach by an aggrieved party. For present purposes I would accept as established law the following propositions. (1) Where a party has repudiated a contract the aggrieved party has an election to accept the repudiation or to affirm the contract: Fercometal S.A.R.L. v. Mediterranean Shipping Co. S.A. [1989] A.C. 788 . (2) An act of acceptance of a repudiation requires no particular form: a communication does not have to be couched in the language of acceptance. It is sufficient that the communication or conduct clearly and unequivocally conveys to the repudiating party that that aggrieved party is treating the contract as at an end. (3) It is rightly conceded by counsel for the buyers that the aggrieved party need not personally, or by an agent, notify the repudiating party of his election to treat the contract as at an end. It is sufficient that the fact of the election comes to the repudiating party's attention, e.g. notification by an unauthorised broker or other intermediary may be sufficient: Wood Factory Pty. Ltd. v. Kiritos Pty. Ltd. (1985) 2 N.S.W.L.R. 105, 146, per McHugh J.A.; Majik Markets Pty. Ltd. v. S. & M. Motor Repairs Pty. Ltd. (No. 1) (1987) 10 N.S.W.L.R. 49, 54, per Young J.; Carter and Harland, Contract Law in Australia, 3rd ed. (1996), pp. 689-691, para. 1970.

The arbitrator did not put forward any heterodox general theory of the law of repudiation. On the contrary he expressly stated that unless the repudiation was accepted by the sellers and the acceptance was communicated to the buyers the election was of no effect. It is plain that the arbitrator directed himself correctly in accordance with the governing general principle. The criticism of the arbitrator's reasoning centres on his conclusion that 'the failure of [the sellers] to take any further step to perform the contract which was apparent to [the buyers] constituted sufficient communication of acceptance.' By that statement the arbitrator was simply recording a finding that the buyers knew that the sellers were treating the contract as at an end. That interpretation is reinforced by the paragraph in his award read as a whole. The only question is whether the relevant holding of the arbitrator was wrong in law.

It is now possible to turn directly to the first issue posed, namely whether non-performance of an obligation is ever as a matter of law capable of constituting an act of acceptance. On this aspect I found the judgment of Phillips J. entirely convincing. One cannot generalise on the point. It all depends on the particular contractual relationship and the particular circumstances of the case. But, like Phillips J., I am satisfied that a failure to perform may sometimes signify to a repudiating party an election by the aggrieved party to treat the contract as at an end. Postulate the case where an employer at the end of a day tells a contractor that he, the employer, is repudiating the contract and that the contractor need not return the next day. The contractor does not return the next day or at all. It seems to me that the contractor's failure to return may, in the absence of any other explanation, convey a decision to treat the contract as at an end. Another example may be an overseas sale providing for shipment on a named ship in a given month. The seller is obliged to obtain an export licence. The buyer repudiates the contract before loading starts. To the knowledge of the buyer the seller does not apply for an export licence with the result that the transaction cannot proceed. In such circumstances it may well be that an ordinary businessman, circumstanced as the parties were, would conclude that the seller was treating the contract as at an end. Taking the present case as illustrative, it is important to bear in mind that the tender of a bill of lading is the pre-condition to payment of the price. Why should an arbitrator not be able to infer that when, in the days and weeks following loading and the sailing of the vessel, the seller failed to tender a bill of lading to the buyer he clearly conveyed to a trader that he was treating the contract as at an end? In my view therefore the passage from the judgment of Kerr L.J. in the Golodetz case [1989] 2 Lloyd's Rep. 277, 286, if it was intended to enunciate a general and absolute rule, goes too far. It will be recalled, however, that Kerr L.J. spoke of a continuing failure to perform. One can readily accept that a continuing failure to perform, i.e. a breach commencing before the repudiation and continuing thereafter, would necessarily be equivocal. In my view too much has been made of the observation of Kerr L.J. Turning to the observation of Nourse L.J. [1996] Q.B. 108, 116-117, that a failure to perform a contractual obligation is necessarily and always equivocal I respectfully disagree. Sometimes in the practical world of businessmen an omission to act may be as pregnant with meaning as a positive declaration. While the analogy of offer and acceptance is imperfect it is not without significance that while the general principle is that there can be no acceptance of an offer by silence, our law does in exceptional cases recognize acceptance of an offer by silence. Thus in Rust v. Abbey Life Assurance Co. Ltd. [1979] 2 Lloyd's Rep. 334 the Court of Appeal held that a failure by a proposed insured to reject a proffered insurance policy for seven months justified on its own an inference of acceptance: see also Treitel, The Law of Contract, 9th ed. (1995), pp. 30-32. Similarly, in the different field of repudiation, a failure to perform may sometimes be given a colour by special circumstances and may only be explicable to a reasonable person in the position of the repudiating party as an election to accept the repudiation.

My Lords, I would answer the question posed by this case in the same way as Phillips J. did. In truth the arbitrator inferred an election, and communication of it, from the tenor of the rejection telex and the failure, inter alia, to tender the bill of lading. That was an issue of fact within the exclusive jurisdiction of the arbitrator.

For these reasons I would allow the appeal of the sellers.

== See also ==
- English contract law
