= Unleashed (memoir) =

2024 memoir by Boris Johnson

- Author: Boris Johnson
- Language: English
- Genre: Memoir
- Published: 10 October 2024
- Publisher: William Collins
- Publication place: United Kingdom
- Pages: 784

Unleashed is a memoir written by Boris Johnson, who was Prime Minister of the United Kingdom from 2019 to 2022. It was published by HarperCollins in the UK on 10 October 2024 and in the US on 15 October 2024.

== Publication history ==
Johnson's memoir was announced in January 2023. He received a £510,000 advance. The title, Unleashed, and UK and US publication dates on 10 and 15 October 2024 were announced in June 2024. Excerpts were published in the Daily Mail and Mail on Sunday on the weekend of 27–29 September.

Two days before the publication date in London, a launch party was held at the headquarters of the Institute of Directors. Attendees included James Cleverly, Michael Gove, Kit Malthouse, Priti Patel, Jacob Rees-Mogg, Grant Shapps, and Ben Wallace, who had all served as Conservative Party Members of Parliament during Johnson's premiership.

In the lead up to release Unleashed topped Amazon UK Books' Best Sellers list. The book remained the top seller in its second week, albeit with its sales having declined by 62% compared to its first week.

== Style and content ==
Reports on Unleashed have noted that Johnson's style is unconventional for a prime minister's memoirs, dramatic and full of wordplay like his speaking style or his newspaper columns, and also full of exclamations like "kerchingeroo!" and "BIFF!" The book contains several revelations: that he considered a military raid on The Netherlands to secure the release of Oxford–AstraZeneca COVID-19 vaccine doses, that he himself became seriously ill with Covid and "might have carked it" but for the care he received in hospital, that on a request, he vainly attempted to dissuade Prince Harry from leaving the UK by means of a "manly pep talk", and that he considers it possible that a listening device found in his personal toilet at the Foreign Office in 2017 had been placed there by Israeli Prime Minister Benjamin Netanyahu. He also writes that Queen Elizabeth II's cause of death was bone cancer.

In interviews promoting the book, Johnson also said that Donald Trump would have prevented the Russian invasion of Ukraine if he had been re-elected in 2020, and that he is "optimistic" about a second Trump presidency.

== Reception ==
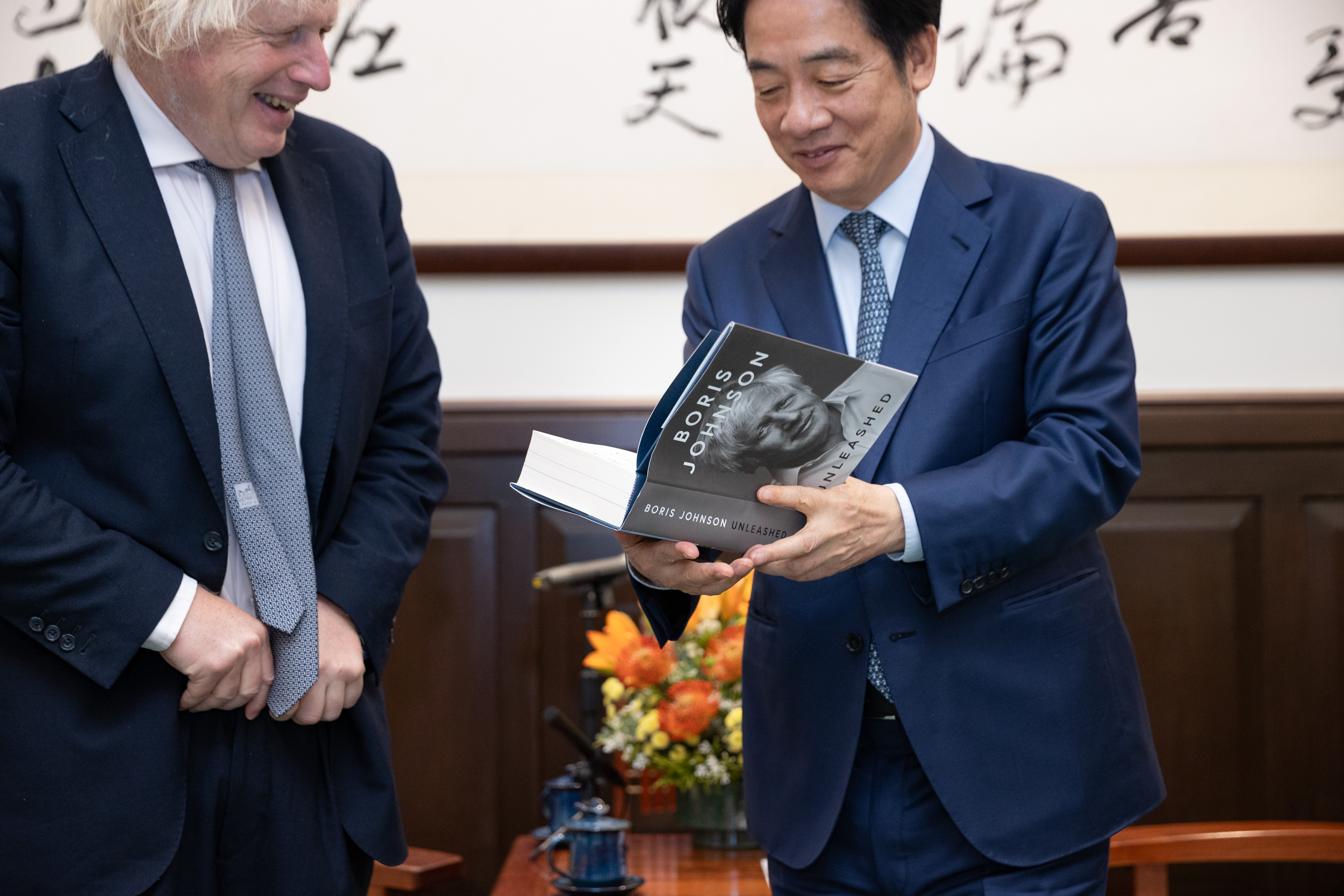
Taiwanese President William Lai is gifted a copy of Unleashed by Johnson in August 2025.

A reviewer for The Times characterised Unleashed as "important historical document, but not necessarily a valuable one ... very generously seasoned with juvenile gags, some of more than acceptable quality". A reviewer for the Washington Post described the book as "Funny. Frustrating. And not entirely believable." The Observer review warned: "No phrase that Johnson writes in this book comes entirely unlaced with hyperbole or self-serving spin. You'd hope the copy editors were being paid by the marginal note and had access to physiotherapy for RSI." Under the headline "Memoirs of a clown", the reviewer for The Guardian noted that Johnson "does not do reflective" and called the book "entertaining but ... irritating for its lack of structure". Reviewing the book for The New Statesman, Nicola Sturgeon, the former Scottish First Minister, characterised it as "not as bad as I thought it would be" but too unserious: "There is nothing that he won't make a crass joke about if it serves his narrative purpose." The reviewer for The Independent called it "shameless, sour, predictable, self-exculpatory stuff"; the review in The Economist is titled "Boris Johnson shows how not to write a political memoir".

The Daily Mail, in introducing its serialised excerpts, called Unleashed "the political memoir of the century". The reviewer for The Telegraph gave it five stars, praising Johnson's writing but noting that "the games with words ... can distract" and that the book offers little insight into his "inner life".
