= White & Carter (Councils) Ltd v McGregor =

White and Carter (Councils) Ltd v McGregor
- Court: House of Lords
- Decided: 6 December 1961
- Citations: [1961] UKHL 5 [1962] AC 413

Court membership
- Judges sitting: Lord Reid, Lord Morton of Henryton, Lord Tucker, Lord Keith of Avonholm, Lord Hodson

Keywords
- Contract, remedies

White and Carter (Councils) Ltd. v McGregor [1961] UKHL 5 is a Scottish and English contract law case, concerning the right to terminate a contract and the duty to mitigate.

== Facts ==
In 1954, White & Carter (Councils) Ltd. entered into a three-year contract to display advertisements for McGregor's garage company on litter bins. In 1957, with the contract set to expire, McGregor's sales manager, Mr Ward, renewed the contract; however, later that day, when the company learnt of this, they informed White & Carter that Ward had no authority to enter into such a contract, writing to them saying:

Dear Sirs, we regret that our Mr. Ward signed an order today continuing the lamp post advertisements for a further period of 3 years. He was unaware that our proprietor Mr. McGregor does not wish to continue this form of advertisement. Please therefore cancel the order.

White & Carter (Councils) Ltd. refused cancellation and displayed the ads, and brought an action for the price.

== Judgment ==
The House of Lords held, 3 to 2, that the claimants could recover the contract price and were not obliged to take steps to mitigate their loss because there was an automatic claim in debt. There was no obligation to accept the breach, even though it was unfortunate that the claimants had 'saddled themselves with an unwanted contract causing an apparent waste of time and money'. Because it was a claim in debt and not damages, the mitigation rule had no application.

Lord Hodson said it was not a discretionary remedy, and a 'novel equitable doctrine that a party was not to be held to his contract unless the court in a given instance thought it reasonable so to do' was not going to be introduced.

The dissenting judges held that the claimants had failed to mitigate their loss.

== See also ==
- English contract law
