= Mechanisms of the English common law =

Legal mechanisms

In the English system of common law, judges have devised a number of mechanisms to allow them to cope with precedent decisions.

== Issues of the common law ==
According to Montesquieu, it is Parliament that has the rightful power to legislate, not the judiciary. The legal fiction is that judges do not make law, they merely "declare it". Thus, common law is declaratory, and this is often retrospective in effect. For example, see Shaw v DPP and R v Knuller. In the search for justice and fairness, there is a tension between the needs for, on one hand, predictability and stability, and "up-to date law", on the other.

There is a hierarchy of courts, and a hierarchy of decisions. All lower courts are bound by the judgments from higher courts; and higher courts are not bound by decisions from lower courts.

With one exception, courts of record are bound by their own precedent decisions. The House of Lords used to be bound by its own decisions, but in 1966 it issued a Practice Direction declaring that it would no longer feel so constrained; the Supreme Court is similarly free to depart from earlier decisions. By contrast, the Court of Appeal is bound by its own decisions, although for a period Lord Denning, MR, acted as though it were not. Inferior courts are not strictly courts of record, but some, such as employment tribunals methodically report their own cases, and have built up a specialist body of common law. Courts such as the magistrates court cannot establish precedent.

Even if a court is bound to observe a precedent decision, it does not follow that the whole of the judgment is binding. One must distinguish between ratio decidendi and obiter dicta. Ratio decidendi is the "reason for the decision", and forms the crux of the cases; whereas obiter dicta is "other things that are said", i.e. matters said in passing, judicial asides, hypothetical issues, and broad issues. Ratio decidendi is binding on other courts, whereas obiter dicta is persuasive only.

An effective test to see if a part of the judgment is ratio or obiter is "Wambaugh's Inversion Test", whereby one must invert the question, and ask, "would the decision have been different without this part of the judgment?". In other words, ask, "Is it crucial?". If not, it is obiter dicta.

If a judgment establishes a broad principle of law, then strictly speaking that principle is too wide to be said to be ratio decidendi. Nevertheless, if that broad principle is approved and applied by later courts, then the principle will eventually be treated as ratio. A particular example is the broad "neighbour principle", enunciated by Lord Atkin in Donoghue v Stevenson 1932, which has become the basis of the modern law of negligence. When judges may face conflicting precedents, they may select the preferable case.

Dissenting judgments are not ratio, and so must be obiter. Sometimes, with the passage of time, more attention is given to the dissenting judgment that to the majority judgment. Scottish decisions (and decisions from the USA and common law jurisdictions in the Commonwealth) are, like obiter dicta, merely persuasive in England.

== The mechanisms ==
If faced with a binding judicial precedent, a court has a number of ways to respond to it, and may use the following legal devices and mechanisms:

- Applying - simply following the precedent, and using its ratio in the current case.
- Approval - showing approval of the earlier case, without necessarily applying it.
- Overruling - declaring the precedent to be wrong, making it bad law.
- Disapproval - showing disapproval of the earlier case, without necessarily overruling it.
- Per incuriam - declaring the precedent to be mistaken, because the earlier court failed to take note of a crucial precedent or statute.
- Distinguishing - failing to follow a case because of a material distinction of fact.
