= Mistake in English contract law =

Term of art in law

The law of mistake comprises a group of separate rules in English contract law. If the law deems a mistake to be sufficiently grave, then a contract entered into on the grounds of the mistake may be void. A mistake is an incorrect understanding by one or more parties to a contract. There are essentially three types of mistakes in contract:

- Unilateral mistake is where only one party to a contract is mistaken as to the terms or subject-matter. The courts will uphold such a contract unless it was determined that the non-mistaken party was aware of the mistake and tried to take advantage of the mistake. It is also possible for a contract to be void if there was a mistake in the identity of the contracting party. An example is in Lewis v Averay where Lord Denning MR held that the contract can only be avoided if the plaintiff can show that, at the time of agreement, the plaintiff believed the other party's identity was of vital importance. A mere mistaken belief as to the credibility of the other party is not sufficient.
- Mutual mistake is when both parties of a contract are mistaken as to the terms. Each believes they are contracting to something different. The court usually tries to uphold such a mistake if a reasonable interpretation of the terms can be found. However, a contract based on a mutual mistake in judgement does not cause the contract to be voidable by the party that is adversely affected. See Raffles v Wichelhaus.
- Common mistake is where both parties hold the same mistaken belief of the facts. This is demonstrated in the case of Bell v Lever Brothers Ltd, which established that common mistake can only void a contract if the mistake of the subject-matter was sufficiently fundamental to render its identity different from what was contracted, making the performance of the contract impossible. This is similar to frustration, except that the event precedes, rather than follows the time of agreement.

== Common mistake ==
- McRae v Commonwealth Disposals Commission [1951] HCA 79, (1951) 84 CLR 377, High Court (Australia).
- Bell v Lever Bros [1932] AC 161 (contract upheld despite mistake if the mistake is not "fundamental to the identity of the contract")
- Grist v Bailey [1967] Ch 532
- Nicholson & Venn v Smith-Marriot (1947) 177 L.T. 189
- Associated Japanese Bank (International) Ltd v Credit du Nord [1989] 1 WLR 255
- Brennan v Bolt Burdon [2004] 3 WLR 1321
- Great Peace Shipping Ltd v Tsavliris Salvage (International) Ltd [2003] QB 679
- Galloway v Galloway
- Scott v Coulson

Res sua, where there is a mistake as to the title/name of an involved party (where the subject matter already belongs to oneself for example):

- Cooper v Phibbs

Res extincta, where the subject matter does not exist:

- Courturier v Hastie (contract for sale of corn void due to decay of the corn, unknown to the seller)
- Sale of Goods Act 1979 s. 6 (contract for sale of goods void if the goods have perished without the seller's knowledge)

== Mutual mistake ==
- Raffles v Wichelhaus (1864) 2 H & C906; 159 ER 375

== Unilateral mistake to identity ==
Mistake as to identity occurs when one party – usually deceived by a "rogue" – believes themselves to be bargaining with another, uninvolved, third party. In a typical situation of this kind, the contract will either be void for mistake, or voidable for fraud. Such a distinction depends on the manner in which the contract was made. There are two types: (1) Contract made inter absentes, when the parties do not meet face-to-face, e.g. through correspondence; and (2) Contract made inter praesentes—when the parties meet face-to-face One commentator states "'[t]here are few more vexed areas of contract law' than mistake of identity." The English approach provides less protection to the purchaser from a rogue than American law.

=== Inter absentes ===
A Contract made inter absentes occurs when the parties do not meet face-to-face, e.g. through correspondence.

Cases:

- Cundy v Lindsay [1878] 3 App Cas 459: In this leading case, Lindsay & Co sold handkerchiefs to a rogue pretending to be an existent and reputable firm Blenkiron & Co (they were dealing by correspondence). The contract was held to be void for mistake because Lindsay & Co had intended to contract with Blenkiron & Co, not the rogue. Lindsay & Co were able to recover the handkerchiefs from a third party who had purchased them from the rogue (as the rogue did not have good title to pass on to them).
- King's Norton Metal Co v Edridge Merrett & Co [1897] 14 TLR 98: In a situation similar to the preceding case, except that rogue used the name of a non-existent company. The seller could not claim they had intended to contract with the non-existent company, so the contract was merely voidable for fraud, and the third party obtained good title to the goods.
- Shogun Finance Ltd v Hudson [2004] 1 AC 919: Although Cundy v Lindsay and Phillips v Brooks have had a difficult co-existence which has led to confusion (e.g. Ingram v Little,) the principle was upheld by a 3:2 majority in the House of Lords decision of Shogun Finance Ltd v Hudson. The minority of Lord Nicholls and Lord Millett argued strongly for the abandonment of Cundy v Lindsay and in favour of the principle that all mistakes for identity merely render a contract voidable; for instance, Lord Nicholls argued that the loss should be borne by the seller, "who takes the risks inherent in parting with his goods without receiving payment", rather than by the innocent third party.

=== Inter praesentes ===
A contract made inter praesentes occurs when the parties meet face-to-face. Cases:

- Phillips v Brooks [1919] 2 KB 243

In a contract was made face to face, the court presumed that the seller intended to contract with the person in front of them, so the contract was not void for mistake to identity.

- Ingram v Little [1961] 1 QB 31
- Lewis v Averay [1971] 3 WLR 603

A rogue impersonating one Richard Greene, a popular actor, told the plaintiff who had advertised to the sale of his car and offered to buy it for the advertised price, 450 pounds. Subsequently, the rogue appended his signature that clearly displayed "R. A. Green" on a cheque which he presented to the seller; as a result, he was granted the chance of taking away the car. The cheque bounced and the buyer was indeed not Richard Green. He sold the car to one Averay, a third party who purchased the car in honesty. In an action brought against Averay for conversion, the Court of Appeal, following Phillips v. Brooks and disregarding Ingram v. Little held that despite his mistake, the plaintiff had completed a contract with the rogue.

=== Unilateral mistake as to terms ===
- Hartog v Colin & Shields [1939] 3 All E.R. 566
- Smith v Hughes (1871) LR 6 QB 597
- Solle v Butcher [1950] 1 KB 671
- Clarion Ltd v National Provident Institution [2000] 1 WLR 1888

=== Non Est Factum ===
- Saunders v Anglia Building Society (Gallie v. Lee) [1971] AC 1004

=== Rectification ===
- F.E. Rose (London) Ltd v WH Pim & Co Ltd [1953] 2 Q.B. 450

== See also ==
- English tort law
- Amalgamated Investment and Property Co Ltd v John Walker & Sons Ltd [1977] 1 WLR 164
