= Solle v Butcher =

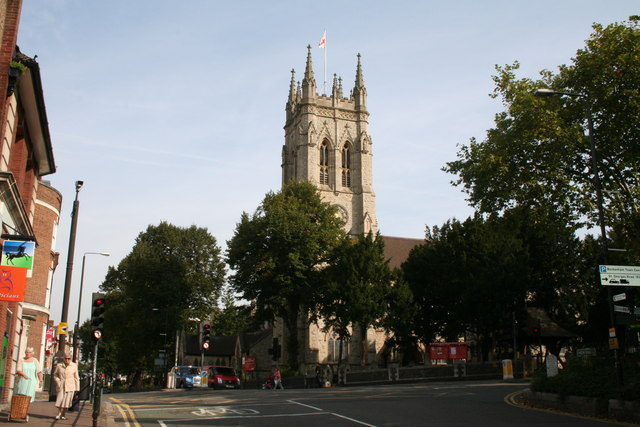
- Beckenham centre, near Maywood House
- Court: Court of Appeal of England and Wales
- Citation: [1950] 1 KB 671

Keywords
- Contract, remedies

Solle v Butcher [1950] 1 KB 671 is an English contract law case, concerning the right to have a contract declared voidable in equity. Denning LJ reaffirmed a class of "equitable mistakes" in his judgment, which enabled a claimant to avoid a contract. Denning LJ said,

... a contract will be set aside if the mistake of the one party has been induced by a material misrepresentation of the other, even though it was not fraudulent or fundamental; or if one party, knowing that the other is mistaken about the terms of an offer, or the identity of the person by whom it is made, lets him remain under his delusion and concludes a contract on the mistaken terms instead of pointing out the mistake.... A contract is also liable in equity to be set aside if the parties were under a common misapprehension either as to facts or as to their relative and respective rights, provided that the misapprehension was fundamental and that the party seeking to set it aside was not himself at fault.

This would have essentially recognised a wider application of a duty of disclosure in most cases, triggered by actual knowledge of one party that another party was mistaken about terms. The case was doubted by a subsequent Court of Appeal case, The Great Peace.

== Facts ==
Mr Charles Butcher, the landlord, had leased a flat in Maywood House, Beckenham, to Mr Godfrey Solle, the tenant, at £250 a year, both parties believing that the Rent Acts did not apply to the property. Mr Solle later claimed that he should be repaid money over the regulated rent for the flat. Mr Butcher counterclaimed that their contract should be void because both were mistaken about rent regulation applying. The Increase of Rent and Mortgage Interest (Restrictions) Act 1920 sections 1 and 14 and Rent and Mortgage Interest (Restrictions) Act 1938 section 7 regulated rent rises, and gave tenants basic rights upon renewal, to prevent the housing market becoming unaffordable. Butcher was in fact in a business partner, doing real estate, with Solle. In 1947, Butcher had bought that flat, with four others, that were damaged by a land mine in the war. He spent money renovating them and leased them out. In 1939, the first flat had been leased out to a third party at the regulated rent of £140 a year. In fact, the Rent Acts did apply, so without going through statutory procedures for letting, the true rent should have been fixed at the first flat's previous rent, £140. Solle and Butcher's business relationship had deteriorated, and so when Solle realized the mistake about rent regulation, he claimed the overpaid rent back (i.e. restitution) from Butcher. Butcher counterclaimed to rescind the whole contract for common mistake.

== Judgment ==
The Court of Appeal held by a majority (Jenkins LJ dissenting) that there should be no order for restitution of the overpaid rent, and the contract should be rescinded on terms (i.e. with conditions attached) which Solle be allowed to choose whether to have a lease at £250, or whether to leave the flat.

Bucknill LJ held that Butcher, the landlord, was entitled to rescind the contract, saying the following:

In my opinion, therefore, there was a common mistake of fact on a matter of fundamental importance, namely, as to the identity of the flat with the dwelling-house previously let at a standard rent of 140l. a year, and that the principle laid down in Cooper v Phibbs applies.... Subject to arguments by counsel on the point, I agree with the terms proposed by Denning LJ, on which the present lease should be set aside.

Denning LJ, concurring, said the contract was valid at law, but voidable in equity. The court would have the discretion to impose terms for the contract being set aside. He said the following:

It is quite plain that the parties were under a mistake. They thought that the flat was not tied down to a controlled rent, whereas in fact it was. In order to see whether the lease can be avoided for this mistake it is necessary to remember that mistake is of two kinds: first, mistake which renders the contract void, that is, a nullity from the beginning, which is the kind of mistake which was dealt with by the courts of common law; and, secondly, mistake which renders the contract not void, but voidable, that is, liable to be set aside on such terms as the court thinks fit, which is the kind of mistake which was dealt with by the courts of equity. Much of the difficulty which has attended this subject has arisen because, before the fusion of law and equity, the courts of common law, in order to do justice in the case in hand, extended this doctrine of mistake beyond its proper limits and held contracts to be void which were really only voidable, a process which was capable of being attended with much injustice to third persons who had bought goods or otherwise committed themselves on the faith that there was a contract. In the well-known case of Cundy v Lindsay, Cundy suffered such an injustice. He bought the handkerchiefs from the rogue, Blenkarn, before the Judicature Acts came into operation. Since the fusion of law and equity, there is no reason to continue this process, and it will be found that only those contracts are now held void in which the mistake was such as to prevent the formation of any contract at all.

Let me first consider mistakes which render a contract a nullity. All previous decisions on this subject must now be read in the light of Bell v Lever Bros Ld. The correct interpretation of that case, to my mind, is that, once a contract has been made, that is to say, once the parties, whatever their inmost states of mind, have to all outward appearances agreed with sufficient certainty in the same terms on the same subject matter, then the contract is good unless and until it is set aside for failure of some condition on which the existence of the contract depends, or for fraud, or on some equitable ground. Neither party can rely on his own mistake to say it was a nullity from the beginning, no matter .that it was a mistake which to his mind was fundamental, and no matter that the other party knew that he was under a mistake. A fortiori, if the other party did not know of the mistake, but shared it. The cases where goods have perished at the time of sale, or belong to the buyer, are really contracts which are not void for mistake but are void by reason of an implied condition precedent, because the contract proceeded on the basic assumption that it was possible of performance. So far as cases later than Bell v Lever Bros Ld are concerned, I do not think that Sowler v Potter can stand with King's Norton Metal Co Ld v Edridge, which shows that the doctrine of French law as enunciated by Pothier is no part of English law. Nor do I think that the contract in Nicholson and Venn v Smith-Marriott, was void from the beginning.

Applying these principles, it is clear that here there was a contract. The parties agreed in the same terms on the same subject-matter. It is true that the landlord was under a mistake which was to him fundamental: he would not for one moment have considered letting the flat for seven years if it meant that he could only charge 140l. a year for it. He made th fundamental mistake of believing that the rent he could charge was not tied down to a controlled rent; but, whether it was his own mistake or a mistake common to both him and the tenant, it is not a ground for saying that the lease was from the beginning a nullity. Any other view would lead to remarkable results, for it would mean that, in the many cases where the parties mistakenly think a house is outside the Rent Restriction Acts when it is really within them, the tenancy would be a nullity, and the tenant would have to go; with the result that the tenants would not dare to seek to have their rents reduced to the permitted amounts lest they should be turned out.

Let me next consider mistakes which render a contract voidable, that is, liable to be set aside on some equitable ground. Whilst presupposing that a contract was good at law, or at any rate not void, the court of equity would often relieve a party from the consequences of his own mistake, so long as it could do so without injustice to third parties. The court, it was said, had power to set aside the contract whenever it was of opinion that it was unconscientious for the other party to avail himself of the legal advantage which he had obtained: Torrance v Bolton per James L.J.

The court had, of course, to define what it considered to be unconscientious, but in this respect equity has shown a progressive development. It is now clear that a contract will be set aside if the mistake of the one party has been induced by a material misrepresentation of the other, even though it was not fraudulent or fundamental; or if one party, knowing that the other is mistaken about the terms of an offer, or the identity of the person by whom it is made, lets him remain under his delusion and concludes a contract on the mistaken terms instead of pointing out the mistake. That is, I venture to think, the ground on which the defendant in Smith v Hughes would be exempted nowadays, and on which, according to the view by Blackburn J of the facts, the contract in Cundy v Lindsay, was voidable and not void; and on which the leas in Sowler v Potter, was, in my opinion, voidable and not void.

A contract is also liable in equity to be set aside if the parties were under a common misapprehension either as to facts or as to their relative and respective rights, provided that the misapprehension was fundamental and that the party seeking to set it aside was not himself at fault. That principle was first applied to private rights as long ago as 1730 in Lansdown v Lansdown. There were four brothers, and the second and third of them died. The eldest brother entered on the lands of the deceased brothers, but the youngest brother claimed them. So the two rival brothers consulted a friend who was a local schoolmaster. The friend looked up a book which he then had with him called the Clerk's Remembrancer and gave it as his opinion that the lands belonged to the youngest brother. He recommended the two of them to take further advice, which at first they intended to do, but they did not do so; and, acting on the friend's opinion, the elder brother agreed to divide the estate with the younger brother, and executed deeds and bonds giving effect to the agreement. Lord Chancellor King declared that the documents were obtained by a mistake and by a misrepresentation of the law by the friend, and ordered them to be given up to be cancelled. He pointed out that the maxim ignorantia juris non excusat only means that ignorance cannot be pleaded in excuse of crimes. Eighteen years later, in the time of Lord Hardwicke, the same principle was applied in Bingham v Bingham.

If and in so far as those cases were compromises of disputed rights, they have been subjected to justifiable criticism, but, in cases where there is no element of compromise, but only of mistaken rights, the House of Lords in 1867 in the great case of Cooper v Phibbs, affirmed the doctrine there acted on as correct. In that case an uncle had told his nephew, not intending to misrepresent anything, but being in fact in error, that he (the uncle) was entitled to a fishery; and the nephew, after the uncle's death, acting in the belief of the truth of what the uncle had told him, entered into an agreement to rent the fishery from the uncle's daughters, whereas it actually belonged to the nephew himself. The mistake there as to the title to the fishery did not render the tenancy agreement a nullity. If it had done, the contract would have been void at law from the beginning and equity would have had to follow the law. There would have been no contract to set aside and no terms to impose. The House of Lords, however, held that the mistake was only such as to make it voidable, or, in Lord Westbury's words, "liable to be set aside" on such terms as the court thought fit to impose; and it was so set aside.

The principle so established by Cooper v Phibbs has been repeatedly acted on: see, for instance, Earl Beauchamp v Winn, and Huddersfield Banking Co Ld v Lister. It is in no way impaired by Bell v Lever Bros Ld, which was treated in the House of Lords as a case at law depending on whether the contract was a nullity or not. If it had been considered on equitable grounds, the result might have been different. In any case, the principle of Cooper v Phibbs has been fully restored by Norwich Union Fire Insurance Society Ld v William H. Price Ld.

Applying that principle to this case, the facts are that the plaintiff, the tenant, was a surveyor who was employed by the defendant, the landlord, not only to arrange finance for the purchase of the building and to negotiate with the rating authorities as to the new rateable values, but also to let the flats. He was the agent for letting, and he clearly formed the view that the building was not controlled. He told the valuation officer so. He advised the defendant what were the rents which could be charged. He read to the defendant an opinion of counsel relating to the matter, and told him that in his opinion he could charge 250l. and that there was no previous control. He said that the flats came outside the Act and that the defendant was "clear." The defendant relied on what the plaintiff told him, and authorized the plaintiff to let at the rentals which he had suggested. The plaintiff not only let the four other flats to other people for a long period of years at the new rentals, but also took one himself for seven years at 250l. a year. Now he turns round and says, quite unashamedly, that he wants to take advantage of the mistake to get the flat at 140l. a year for seven years instead of the 250l. a year, which is not only the rent he agreed to pay but also the fair and economic rent; and it is also the rent permitted by the Acts on compliance with the necessary formalities. If the rules of equity have become so rigid that they cannot remedy such an injustice, it is time we had a new equity, to make good the omissions of the old. But, in my view, the established rules are amply sufficient for this case.

On the defendant's evidence, which the judge preferred, I should have thought there was a good deal to be said for the view that the lease was induced by an innocent material misrepresentation by the plaintiff. It seems to me that the plaintiff was not merely expressing an opinion on the law: he was making an unambiguous statement as to private rights; and a misrepresentation as to private rights is equivalent to a misrepresentation of fact for this purpose: MacKenzie v Royal Bank of Canada. But it is unnecessary to come to a firm conclusion on this point, because, as Bucknill LJ has said, there was clearly a common mistake, or, as I would prefer to describe it, a common misapprehension, which was fundamental and in no way due to any fault of the defendant; and Cooper v Phibbs affords ample authority for saying that, by reason of the common misapprehension, this lease can be set aside on such terms as the court thinks fit.

The fact that the lease has been executed is no bar to this relief. No distinction can, in this respect, be taken between rescission for innocent misrepresentation and rescission for common misapprehension, for many of the common misapprehensions are due to innocent misrepresentation; and Cooper v. Phibbs shows that rescission is available even after an agreement of tenancy has been executed and partly performed. The observations in Seddon v North Eastern Salt Co Ld, have lost all authority since Scrutton L.J., threw doubt on them in Bell v Lever Bros Ld, and the Privy Council actually set aside an executed agreement in Mackenzie v Royal Bank of Canada. If and in so far as Angel v Jay decided that an executed lease could not be rescinded for an innocent misrepresentation, it was in my opinion, a wrong decision. It would mean that innocent people would be deprived of their right of rescission before they had any opportunity of knowing they had it. I am aware that in Wilde v Gibson, Lord Campbell said that an executed conveyance could be set aside only on the ground of actual fraud; but this must be taken to be confined to misrepresentations as to defects of title on the conveyance of land.

In the ordinary way, of course, rescission is only granted when the parties can be restored to substantially the same position as that in which they were before the contract was made; but, as Lord Blackburn said in Erlanger v New Sombrero Phosphate Co: "The practice has always been for a court of equity to give this relief whenever, by the exercise of its powers, it can do what is practically just, though it cannot restore the parties precisely to the state they were in before the contract." That indeed was what was done in Cooper v Phibbs. Terms were imposed so as to do what was practically just. What terms then, should be imposed here? If the lease were set aside without any terms being imposed, it would mean that the plaintiff, the tenant, would have to go out and would have to pay a reasonable sum for his use and occupation. That would, however, not be just to the tenant.

The situation is similar to that of a case where a long lease is made at the full permitted rent in the common belief that notices of increase have previously been served, whereas in fact they have not. In that case, as in this, when the lease is set aside, terms must be imposed so as to see that the tenant is not unjustly evicted. When Sir John Romilly MR, was faced with a somewhat similar problem, he gave the tenant the option either to agree to pay the proper rent or to go out: see Garrard v Frankel; and when Bacon V-C. had a like problem before him he did the same, saying that "the object of the court is, as far as it can, to put the parties into the position in which they would have been in if the mistake had not happened": see Paget v Marshall. If the mistake here had not happened, a proper notice of increase would have been given and the lease would have been executed at the full permitted rent. I think that this court should follow these examples and should impose terms which will enable the tenant to choose either to stay on at the proper rent or to go out.

The terms will be complicated by reason of the Rent Restriction Acts, but it is not beyond the wit of man to devise them. Subject to any observations which the parties may desire to make, the terms which I suggest are these: the lease should only be set aside if the defendant is prepared to give an undertaking that he will permit the plaintiff to be a license of the premises pending the grant of a new lease. Then, whilst the plaintiff is a licensee, the defendant will in law be in possession of the premises, and will be able to serve on the plaintiff, as prospective tenant, a notice under s. 7, sub-s. 4, of the Act of 1938 increasing the rent to the full permitted amount. The defendant must further be prepared to give an undertaking that he will serve such a notice within three weeks from the drawing up of the order, and that he will, if written request is made by the plaintiff, within one month of the service of the notice, grant him a new lease at the full permitted amount of rent, not, however, exceeding 250l. a year, for a term expiring on September 29, 1954, subject in all other respects to the same covenants and conditions as in the rescinded lease. If there is any difference of opinion about the figures stated in the notice, that can, of course, be adjusted during the currency of the lease. If the plaintiff does not choose to accept the licence or the new lease, he must go out. He will not be entitled to the protection of the Rent Restriction Acts because, the lease being set aside, there will be no initial contractual tenancy from which a statutory tenancy can spring.

In my opinion, therefore, the appeal should be allowed. The declaration that the standard rent of the flat is 140l. a year should stand. An order should be made on the counterclaim that, on the defendant's giving the undertakings which I have mentioned, the lease be set aside. An account should be had to determine the sum payable for use and occupation. The plaintiff's claim for repayment of rent and for breach of covenant should be dismissed. In respect of his occupation after rescission and during the subsequent licence, the plaintiff will be liable to pay a reasonable sum for use and occupation. That sum should, prima facie, be assessed at the full amount permitted by the Acts, not, however, exceeding 250l a year. Mesne profits as against a trespasser are assessed at the full amount permitted by the Acts, even though notices of increase have not been served, because that is the amount lost by the landlord. The same assessment should be made here, because the sums payable for use and occupation are not rent, and the statutory provisions about notices of increase do not apply to them. All necessary credits must, of course, be given in respect of past payments, and so forth.

Jenkins LJ, dissenting, said the contract could not be rescinded because it was a mistake of law.

== Significance ==
The doctrine of equitable mistake was doubted by the Court of Appeal's ruling in Great Peace Shipping Ltd v Tsavliris (International) Ltd in 2002, and Lord Phillips MR formally disapproved of the Solle v Butcher judgement. Lord Phillips declared that the trial judge, Toulson J., had "reached the bold conclusion that the view of the jurisdiction of the court expressed by Denning LJ in Solle v Butcher was ‘over-broad’, by which he meant wrong"; and he went on to uphold the trial judge's decision.

Solle v Butcher had troubled academic and practising lawyers for decades, and there was some relief when the Great Peace case was decided.

Nevertheless, it remains a point of contention whether mistake in equity does, and should, enable rescission for wider reasons than acknowledged in The Great Peace and its restrictive interpretation.

== See also ==
- English contract law
- Rent rights in England and Wales
