= Bell v Lever Brothers Ltd =

1931 English contract law case

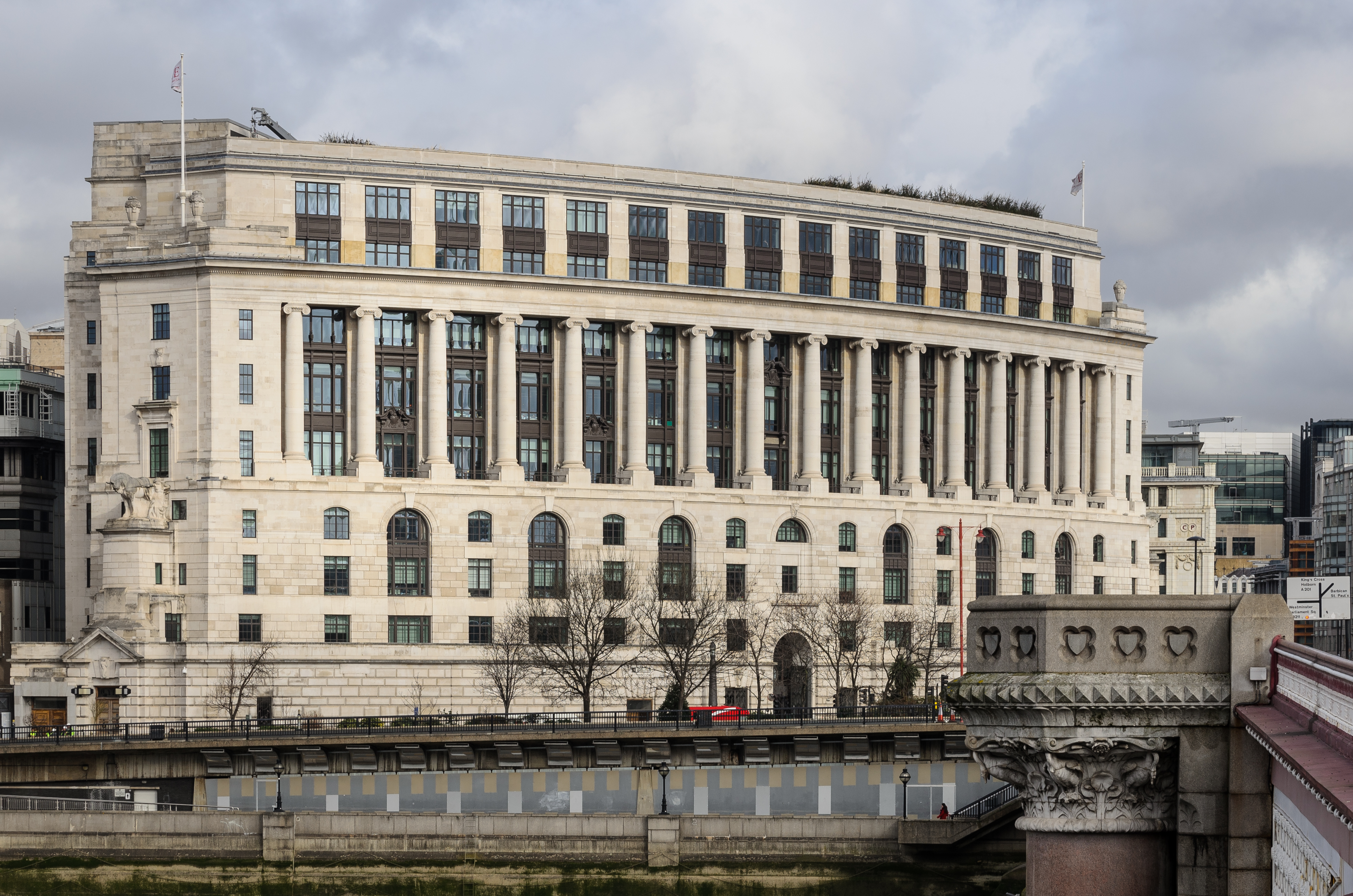
- Unilever House, built in 1929 to house the company's headquarters
- Court: House of Lords
- Decided: 15 December 1931
- Citations: [1931] UKHL 2, [1932] AC 161, [1931] All ER 1
- Transcript: Full judgment from Bailii

Court membership
- Judges sitting: Viscount Hailsham, Lord Blanesburgh, Lord Warrington of Clyffe, Lord Atkin and Lord Thankerton

Keywords
- Common mistake

Bell v Lever Brothers Ltd [1931] UKHL 2 is an English contract law case decided by the House of Lords. Within the field of mistake in English law, it holds that common mistake does not lead to a void contract unless the mistake is fundamental to the identity of the contract.

== Facts ==
Lever Brothers Ltd (which merged in 1930 to become Unilever) was a company which traded in West Africa, through a 99% owned subsidiary called the Niger Company (formerly the Royal Niger Company). The Niger trade was in trouble. Lord Leverhulme, the owner of Lever Bros, hired D'Arcy Cooper (a Quaker and senior partner of his uncle's accountant firm, Cooper Brothers) to be the chairman and manage the crisis. Cooper negotiated a loan from Barclays Bank, which insisted that a professional management run the Niger subsidiary. Cooper hired his friend, Ernest Hyslop Bell, a senior Barclays manager in 1923 as chairman of the subsidiary. Mr Snelling, a tax consultant that had successfully got Lever Bros a big tax refund in 1921, was appointed as vice chairman. They did well, and turned a profit. The company was then merged with a former competitor (African and Eastern Trade Corporation) to form the United Africa Company in 1929.

Bell had wanted to run the new United Africa Company, because he was too old at 54 to have a job in the City, and he had left his Barclays position. At lunch in the Savoy Grill he agreed with Cooper that he would get a big compensation package (£30,000) and retire. A similar "golden parachute" of £20,000 was given to Mr Snelling. However, shortly after, it was revealed that Bell and Snelling had been part of a regional cocoa cartel, and used information on future price reductions to sell cocoa from their personal accounts. Lever Brothers Ltd therefore brought a claim for rescission of the compensation package on grounds of mistake of fact.

== Judgment ==
=== Trial ===
The initial trial was held before Wright J and a City of London Special Jury. The jury found that Bell and Snelling's illicit dealings breached the employment contract and that if Lever Brothers had known they would not have entered into the agreement. Furthermore, the jury found that at the time of the agreement Bell and Snelling did not have in mind their illicit acts. Wright J therefore held the compensation agreements were void.

=== House of Lords ===
On appeal, the House of Lords found that there was no mistake and the contract could not be rescinded nor was it void on mistake. Lord Atkin was writing for the majority. Dissent was written by Lord Warrington and held that the mistaken assumption was fundamental to the contract, and thus the contract is voidable.

The court identified the mistake as a common mistake.

A mutual mistake as to some fact which, by the common intention of the parties to a contract, whether expressed or implied, constitutes the underlying assumption without which the parties would not have made the contract they did, and which, therefore, affects the substance of the whole consideration, is sufficient to render the contract void.

Effectively, the mistake must nullify or negative consent of the parties in order for the agreement to be void.

In order for the contract to be void by common mistake the mistake must involve the actual subject-matter of the agreement and must be of such a "fundamental character as to constitute an underlying assumption without which the parties would not have entered into the agreements".

From the facts the court found that the mistake was not sufficiently close to the actual subject-matter of the agreement. The parties got exactly what they had bargained for.

The MacMillan article explains that the ratio was in part the result of media attention at the time, and socio-economic context of the trial.

== Discussions ==
In an article by JC Smith, "Contracts- mistake, frustration and implied terms", it is suggested that Bell v. Lever Brothers can be analysed into cases of res sua and res extincta.

Lever Brothers in substance was buying the right to 'extinguish' Bell and Snelling. Both parties were under the common mistake that Lever Brothers should pay the "Golden Parachutes" to Bell and Snelling. Lever Brothers did not know Bell and Snelling were speculating while Bell and Snelling did not know their speculation would entitle Lever Brothers to dismiss them without paying anything.

In the point of view of Lever Brothers, they are in substance buying a right they already had, that is extinguishing Bell and Snelling without paying a cent. This would be a case of res sua, since you cannot buy something you already have.

In the point of view of Bell and Snelling, it is the right of entitling the "Golden Parachutes" they are selling. This right does not exist since they speculated. The subject-matter they tried to sell, their right, no longer exist before they enter into the contract. This would be a case of res extincta, the disappearance of the subject-matter of the contract.

In either way, the contract would be void for mistake, though the House of Lords held that the mistake is not fundamental enough.

== Significance ==
The case put a high standard on the finding of common mistake. This was criticized in the later cases written by Lord Denning such as in Solle v Butcher where Denning LJ reduced the standard by enumerating an equitable remedy for a shared common mistake, which rendered the agreement voidable. Subsequently, in Great Peace Shipping Ltd v Tsavliris Salvage (International) Ltd (2002) the Court of Appeal purported to overturn Solle v Butcher and set the standard for common mistake in line with the original Bell v Lever Brothers standard.

Also in Scottish Co-operative Wholesale Society Ltd v Meyer, Lord Denning remarked the following, in the context to the equivalent of an unfair prejudice action under UK company law. "Your Lordships were referred to Bell v Lever Brothers Ltd where Lord Blanesburgh said that a director of one company was at liberty to become a director also of a rival company. That may have been so at that time. But it is at the risk now of an application under section 210 if he subordinates the interests of the one company to those of the other."

== See also ==
- UK competition law
- Cooper v Phibbs [1867] UKHL 1, (1867) LR 2 HL 149
