= Morrisson v Robertson =

Morrisson v Robertson 1907 CSIH 11, 1908 SC 332 is Scots contract law case establishing the common law principles that govern unilateral error.

== Facts ==
Alexander Telford, pretending to be the son and agent of James Wilson, approached Robert Morrisson to purchase two cows. Morrison sold the cows to Telford on credit, because he knew that Wilson had a good credit. Telford re-sold the cows to Robertson. Morrison subsequently found out that Telford had been a rogue and was not related to Wilson. Morrisson petitioned a Sheriff court to recover the two cows from Robertson.

== Judgment ==
The action was successful. It was held that there had been no contract between Morrisson and Telford. The purported transaction was a complete nullity. Accordingly, Telford had no rights which he could pass on to Robertson, so Morrisson was entitled to recover his cows.

== See also ==
- Cundy v Lindsay (1878) 3 App Cas 459, a similar case in English law
- Shogun Finance Ltd v Hudson, a 2003 case
