= Shogun Finance Ltd v Hudson =

English contract law case

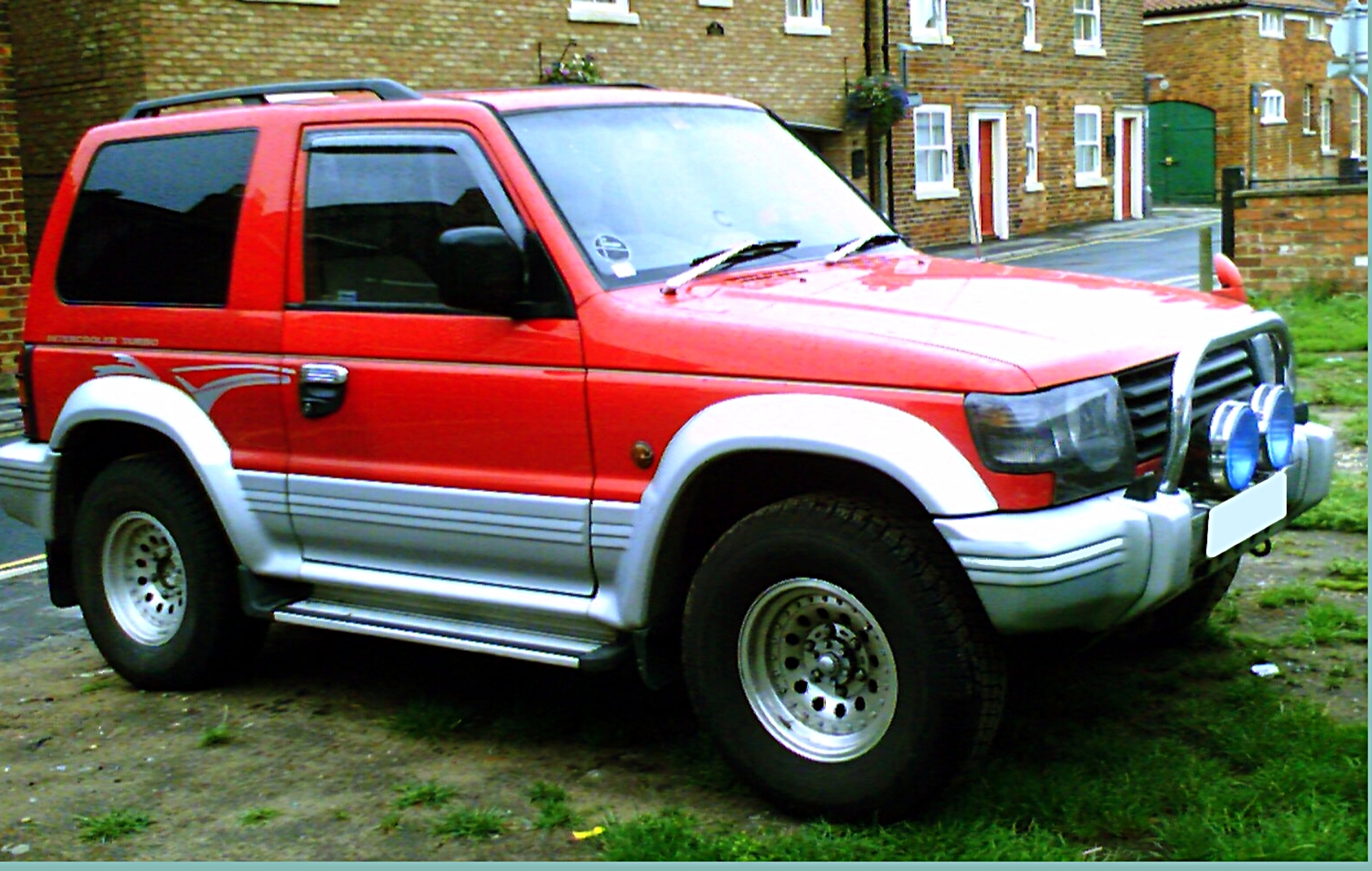
- A Mitsubishi Shogun
- Court: House of Lords
- Decided: 19 December 2003
- Citation: [2004] 1 AC 919; [2003] UKHL 62
- Transcript: Decision from parliament.uk

Case history
- Prior action: [2001] EWCA Civ 1000

Court membership
- Judges sitting: Lord Nicholls of Birkenhead, Lord Hobhouse of Woodborough, Lord Millett, Lord Phillips of Worth Matravers, Lord Walker of Gestingthorpe

Keywords
- mistaken identity, rescission

Shogun Finance Ltd v Hudson [2003] UKHL 62 is an English contract law case decided in the House of Lords, on the subject of mistaken identity as a basis for rescission of a contract. The case has been the subject of much criticism in failing to effectively clarify the area of mistake to identity.

== Facts ==
A rogue went to a dealer to buy a Mitsubishi Shogun on hire purchase. The rogue told them that his name was Mr Patel and produced Mr Patel’s driving licence. The dealer communicated with Shogun Finance, which did a credit check on Mr Patel. Finding no problems, Shogun Finance authorized the hire purchase agreement and the rogue drove away.

The rogue then sold the car to Mr Norman Hudson, who had no knowledge that the vehicle belonged to Shogun Finance and was subject to an apparent hire purchase agreement. Shogun Finance brought a claim against Mr Hudson for the return of its vehicle. Mr Hudson relied on section 27 of the Hire Purchase Act 1964, which creates a statutory exception to the common law principle that "nemo dat quod non habet" (nobody can pass better title than he has), since a non-trade buyer of a car who buys in good faith from a hirer under a hire purchase agreement becomes the owner.

== Judgment ==
In a 3-2 decision, the majority of the House of Lords held there was no contract of hire purchase between Shogun Finance and the rogue, section 27 of the Hire Purchase Act therefore did not apply and the car was not Mr Hudson's. Lord Hobhouse, Lord Phillips and Lord Walker followed the principle established in Cundy v Lindsay, a contract where identity is of key importance is void if the purchaser lies about their identity. The face-to-face exemption established by Phillips v Brooks Ltd did not apply because the seller was not the dealer but the finance company.

Lord Nicholls and Lord Millett dissented, arguing that a better policy would be to remove the face-to-face distinction and protect the good-faith purchaser in all cases:

[This] is in line with the direction in which, under the more recent decisions, the law has now been moving for some time. It accords better with basic principle regarding the effect of fraud on the formation of a contract. It seems preferable as a matter of legal policy. As between two innocent persons the loss is more appropriately borne by the person who takes the risks inherent in parting with his goods without receiving payment. This approach fits comfortably with the intention of Parliament in enacting the limited statutory exceptions to the proprietary principle of nemo dat quod non habet.

Such an idea was proposed by the Law Reform Committee in 1966 in its twelfth report. That would mean that in all cases of mistake to identity, contracts would be voidable, rather than immediately void. Therefore, if the original seller did not repudiate the contract before the goods have been sold on, the third party would be protected.

== Reception ==
The result of Shogun Finance Ltd v Hudson is that the area of mistake to identity retains the 'face to face' distinction: contracts of immediate vicinity differ from contracts made over distance. Such a distinction has been labelled "artificial and unfair" to third parties, who bear the entire loss if, at least in the instant case, it is argued that Shogun Finance Ltd had far better means to uncover the rogue's fraud than the independent purchaser; in any case, the original seller is usually in the better position to protect and insure against such risks.

== See also ==
- Cundy v Lindsay
- Morrisson v Robertson
- Misrepresentation in English law
- Mistake in English law
