= Pothier =

Pothier is a French surname. Notable people with the surname include:

- Robert Joseph Pothier (1699–1772), French jurist and writer on contract law
- Toussaint Pothier (1771–1845) Canadian businessman, seigneur and political figure in Lower Canada
- Dom Joseph Pothier, O.S.B. (1835–1923), French prelate, liturgist and scholar of Gregorian chant
- Aram J. Pothier (1854–1928), American banker and Governor of Rhode Island
- Albert A. Pothier (fl. 1890s) Nova Scotia Assemblyman
- Lucien Pothier (1883–1957), French racing cyclist
- Hector J. Pothier (1891–1976), Canadian physician and Assemblyman in Nova Scotia
- Lucien Pothier (wrestler) (born 1894, date of death unknown), Belgian Olympic wrestler
- Yvonne Pothier (born 1937), Canadian mathematics educator, Catholic nun, and activist for refugees
- Hector Pothier (born 1954), Canadian football player
- Fabrice Pothier (born 1975), French political expert
- Brian Pothier (born 1977), American NHL ice hockey player
- Eric Pothier (born 1979), Canadian luger
- Ahumuza Pothier Alexandria (born 2019), Ugandan

== See also ==
- Pothier House, Rhode Island, historic residence of Aram Pothier
- 18830 Pothier, an asteroid

== See also ==
- Potier
- Pottier
