= Shotter v Westpac Banking Corp =

- Court: High Court of New Zealand
- Full case name: L A & A D Shotter (Plaintiffs)v Westpac Banking Corporation (First Defendant) & J C M Villars (Second Defendant)
- Decided: 12 February 1987
- Citation: [1988] 2 NZLR 316
- Transcript: High Court judgment

Court membership
- Judge sitting: Wylie J

Shotter v Westpac Banking Corp [1988] 2 NZLR 316 is a cited case in New Zealand regarding the definition of what is a mistake under the Contractual Mistakes Act.

== Background ==
Shotter, an insurance broker, and part-time horticulturalist agreed to help Villars purchase and develop a horticultural block, although Shotter was neither a shareholder or director of the holding company Unicorn Holdings Limited.

Unicorn however was $100,000 short in funding the purchase, and they arranged a $100,000 loan from Westpac, for which Shotter was required to give a $100,000 personal guarantee.

The business venture ultimately failed, with Westpac selling the land by mortgagee sale, which resulted in a net surplus of $74,294 after clearing the mortgage.

Later, when the bank pursued Shotter under the guarantee he gave, he was surprised to find they were pursuing him for the full $100,000 of the guarantee, rather than the net amount of 25,706 after deducting the surplus from the mortgage.

Not disclosed to Shotter at the time he gave the guarantee to the bank, that the bank had also lent Unicorn $300,000 for another property development, which also failed.

Shotter challenged the bank arguing he thought the guarantee was limited to any loss related to the horticultural block purchase, and not for the entire liabilities of Unicorn, and pleaded mistake when later sued by the bank.

== Held ==
The court ruled that Shotter was liable for the full $100,000 due to the fact that the mistake was due to his mistaken interpretation of the extent of the guarantee, that the court was barred from granting any relief under s6(2)a of the Contractual Mistakes Act 1977. The court however did allow Shotter's counterclaim for damages for negligence for Westpac not advising him of the $300,000 loan.

Footnote: This position was subsequently upheld by the Court of Appeal in Paulger v Butland Industries Ltd [1989] 3 NZLR 549
