= King v Wilkinson =

- Court: High Court of New Zealand
- Full case name: King v Wilkinson
- Decided: 1994
- Citation: (1994) 2 NZConvC 191,828

King v Wilkinson (1994) 2 NZConvC 191,828 is a cited case in New Zealand regarding where a mistake is known to one party (often referred to as a unilateral mistake) when a contract is formed, under section 6(1)(a)(i) of the Contractual Mistakes Act 1977.

== Background ==
The Kings were interested in purchasing the Wilkinson's property, and Wilkinson's real estate agent showed them over the property resulting in them purchasing the property.

After purchasing the property, the Kings discovered that the fences did not accurately represent the true legal boundary, with the southern boundary fence being 3.5 meters outside the legal boundary of the property, something the Wilkinsons would have been aware of, as four years earlier, they had subdivided the section and so knew the true boundaries of the property.

The Kings sought relief under the Contractual Mistakes Act.

== Held ==
The court granted the Kings relief, as it was a unilateral mistake, covered by section 6(1)(a)(I).
