= Mechenex Pacific Services Ltd v TCA Airconditioning (New Zealand) Ltd =

- Court: Court of Appeal of New Zealand
- Full case name: Mechenex Pacific Services Ltd v TCA Airconditioning (New Zealand) Ltd
- Decided: 19 December 1990
- Citation: [1991] 2 NZLR 393

Court membership
- Judges sitting: Richardson J, Somers J, Hardie Boys J

Mechenex Pacific Services Ltd v TCA Airconditioning (New Zealand) Ltd [1991] 2 NZLR 393 is a frequently cited case regarding mutual mistake.

== Background ==
Mechenex were the contractors to supply a new airconditioning system for a building, for which the building plans required a system of 4 litres per second, and they contacted TCA if they could supply a 4 lps system.

TCA were unable to supply such a system, but nonetheless made a written offer to instead supply a different system rated at 5.39 liters per second, and attached to this quote were TCA's terms and conditions for this offer. Mechenex eventually accepted TCA's offer "as per TCA's quotation", and TCA manufactured and delivered the coils.

Unfortunately, Mechenex's head contractor would not accept the TCA coils due to the difference in the specifications, and as a result, Mechenex refused to pay TCA for the coils, on the basis that TCA had supplied the wrong type of coils. TCA claimed that their supply of the coils was not covered by the original offer, but by TCA's subsequent offer.

Mechenex pleaded this was a case of mutual mistake, under section 6(1)(iii) of the Contractual Mistakes Act 1977.

== Held ==
Mechenex's claim of mutual mistake failed, as this was a mistake of interpretation of the contract, which excluded the courts granting relief under the Contractual Mistakes Act. Hardie Boys J stated "The mistake is therefore of the same character as that of the unfortunate appellant in Paulger v Butland Industries Ltd [1989] 3 NZLR 549"
