= Lewis v Averay =

English contract law case

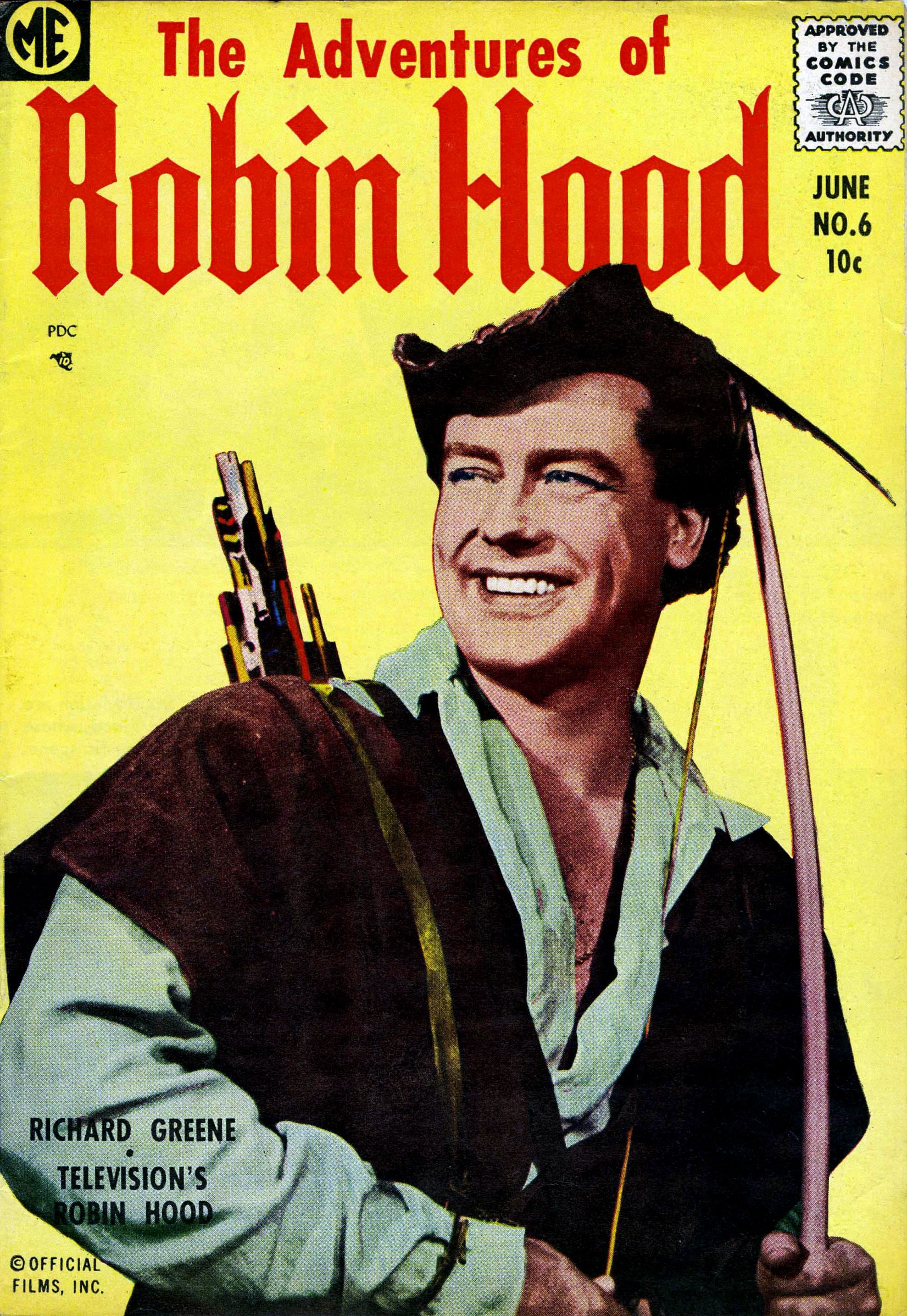
- Richard Greene, not the rogue
- Court: Court of Appeal
- Citation: [1971] EWCA Civ 4, [1972] 1 QB 198, [1971] 3 WLR 603

Keywords
- Mistake about identity, fraudulent misrepresentation

Lewis v Averay [1971] EWCA Civ 4 is a case in English contract law on fraudulent misrepresentation or "mistake" about identity.

== Facts ==
Impersonating Richard Greene, a popular actor from The Adventures of Robin Hood (TV series), a rogue gave this false name to the plaintiff who had advertised the sale of his car, and offered to buy it for the advertised price, £450. Subsequently, the rogue appended his signature that clearly displayed "R. A. Greene" on a cheque which he presented to the seller. As a result, he was granted the chance of taking away the car. The cheque bounced and the buyer was indeed not Richard Greene. The rogue sold the car to Averay, a third party who purchased the car in good faith. An action was brought against Averay for conversion.

== Judgment ==
The Court of Appeal, following Phillips v Brooks held that despite his mistake, the plaintiff had completed a contract with the rogue. Lord Denning MR held there was no operative mistake and the property had passed to the rogue. Therefore Mr. Averay got to keep the car. He held there was nothing to displace the Ingram v Little presumption here, and that case had ‘special facts’.

Phillimore LJ concurred.

== See also ==
- English contract law
