= Realty Services Holdings Ltd v Slater =

- Court: High Court of New Zealand
- Full case name: Realty Services Holdings Limited v David Joseph Slater and Geraldine Grace Slater
- Decided: 18 November 2005
- Citation: (2006) 6 NZCPR 657
- Transcript: High Court judgment

Court membership
- Judge sitting: Lang J

Realty Services Holdings Ltd v Slater (2006) 6 NZCPR 657 is a cited case in New Zealand regarding where a mistake is known to one party (often referred to as a unilateral mistake) when a contract is formed, under section 6(1)(a)(i) of the Contractual Mistakes Act 1977.

== Background ==
Realty Services was a local real estate agent in Rotorua. They had just built a new office building, and they had 2 apartments in it to sell, Apartment A and Apartment B. Apartment B was quickly sold for $641,000, but they struggled to sell Apartment A for $630,000. Eventually, they agreed to sell the apartment to the Slaters for $300,000 in cash, plus the transfer of a property in Kawaha Point. Realty Services agents had valued the property at $300,000 to $330,000, with a registered valuation of $330,000. This implied a sale price of about $630,000. However, matters were complicated by the fact that the Kawaha property was in 2 titles, Lot 1 and Lot 2.

Further complicating matters was that in the sales agreement, Realty Services only included Lot 1 to be transferred. After the sale had gone through, Realty Services realised their mistake, and requested the Slaters transfer Lot 2 to them as well. The Slaters refused, saying their intention was only to transfer Lot 1, and they got a valuation of the property for $410,000 to support this claim.

== Held ==
The judge ruled that there was a unilateral mistake here, as the Slaters were well aware of the mistake at the time, considering that they knew they wanted $630,000, and even with Slaters best valuation, valued the transaction at only $470,000. Furthermore, the judge said that Mr Slater had extensive property knowledge and that he had not demurred when the real estate firm valued his property at $330,000. While the judge refused to rectify the contract, he effectively did this anyway, by granting relief by ordering the Slaters to transfer Lot 2 to Realty Services.
