= Phillips v Brooks Ltd =

English contract law case

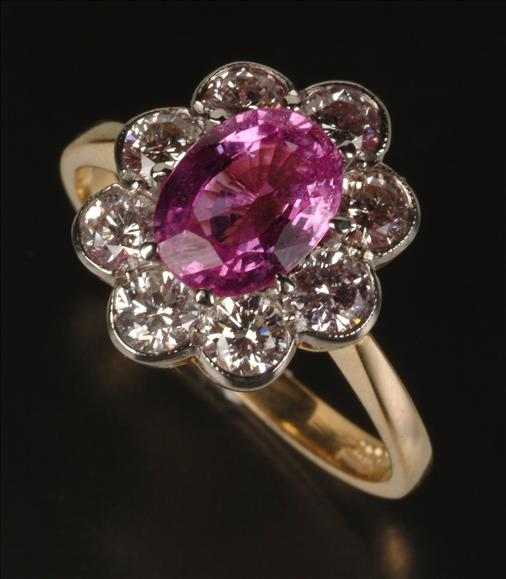
- Decided: 1 May 1919
- Citation: [1919] 2 KB 243

Court membership
- Judge sitting: Horridge J

Keywords
- Fraudulent misrepresentation, mistake about identity, third party rights

Phillips v Brooks Ltd [1919] 2 KB 243 is an English contract law case concerning mistake. It held that a person is deemed to contract with the person in front of them unless they can substantially prove that they instead intended to deal with someone else (see also Shogun Finance Ltd v Hudson).

== Facts ==
On 15 April 1918, a man named North entered Phillips' jewellery shop and said, "I am Sir George Bullough". He wrote a dud cheque for £3000 to pay for some pearls and a ring. He said he lived in St. James's Square. Mr Phillips checked the phone directory and found there was someone there by that name. Mr Phillips asked if he would like to take the jewellery with him and Mr North said he would leave the pearls but take the ring 'for his wife's birthday tomorrow'. Mr North then pawned the ring to Brooks Ltd for £350. When the false cheque was dishonoured, Phillips sued Brooks Ltd to get the ring back.

Note that there are conflicting reports showing that Mr North identified himself after the ring was sold, as Viscount Haldane said in Lake v Simmons, but others say that North identified himself straight away.

== Judgment ==
The earlier judgement of Cundy v Lindsay had established that contracts could be automatically void for mistake to identity. Where this is the case, title does not pass to the fraudulent buyer, and the third party loses out in the entirety. This principle is different where parties contract face to face; Horridge J stated:

I have carefully considered the evidence of the plaintiff, and have come to the conclusion that, although he believed the person to whom he was handing the ring was Sir George Bullough, he in fact contracted to sell and deliver it to the person who came into his shop.

This outcome can be explained by putting it as such: Mr Phillips hoped he was contracting with Sir George Bullough, but in reality he agreed to contract with whoever came into his shop, taking a risk that he was not who he said he was. It had the mere effect of making the contract voidable for fraud, meaning that title passed to the rogue and subsequently to the third party buyer:

The following expressions used in the judgment of Horridge J seem to me to fit the facts in this case:

"The minds of the parties met and agreed upon all the terms of the sale, the thing sold, the price and time of payment, the person selling and the person buying. The fact that the seller was induced to sell by fraud of the buyer made the sale voidable, but not void. He could not have supposed that he was selling to any other person; his intention was to sell to the person present, and identified by sight and hearing; it does not defeat the sale because the buyer assumed a false name or practised any other deceit to induce the vendor to sell."

== See also ==
- English contract law
- Misrepresentation
- Mistake in English contract law
- Nemo dat quod non habet
- Cundy v Lindsay
- Shogun Finance Ltd v Hudson
