= Ware v Johnson =

- Court: High Court of New Zealand
- Full case name: Ross Graeme Ware & Shirley Judith Ware (First Plaintiffs) and Peter David Romeril Miller & Norman Owen Wells (Second Plaintiffs) v Barry Arthur Johnson and Audrey Beryl Johnson (Defendants)
- Decided: 16 December 1983
- Citation: [1984] 2 NZLR 518
- Transcript: High Court judgment

Court membership
- Judge sitting: Pritchard J

Ware v Johnson [1984] 2 NZLR 518 is a cited case in New Zealand regarding where both parties entering into a contract make the same mistake (often referred to as a common mistake) when a contract is formed, under section 6(1)(a)(ii) of the Contractual Mistakes Act 1977.

== Background ==
Johnson, a builder by trade, dabbled part-time in converting lifestyle blocks into Kiwifruit orchards, and selling them. In 1979, he purchased a lifestyle block, planting 1605 kiwifruit vines, and sold the orchard for $365,000 the following year in 1980 to the Wares.

At the time of the purchase, the vines seemed healthy, but the following year the vine growth appeared to be stunted. The Johnsons got several experts to investigate, and were advised that the problem was caused by the application of a weed spray called Krovar and were advised to rip out all the vines, remove 30 cm of topsoil, and replant the vines.

When Mr Ware asked Mr Johnson if he has sprayed Krovar on the vines, he denied ever using it. However, during the trial, he admitted he had sprayed it about 10% of the orchard. A neighbor also testified at the trial that Johnson had told him that he had sprayed Krovar there as well.

The Wares eventually sued the Johnsons for the loss.

== Held ==
After 23 days in court, the judge ruled that on the balance of probabilities that Johnson did use Krovar on the orchard, thus making Johnson liable for damages for this loss. Pritchard J said "This provision relates to common mistake - where both parties labour under the same mistake. By requiring as a condition of relief that both parties be "influenced in their respective decisions", the Act cannot mean that both parties must be induced by the mistake to enter into the contract". The judge awarded damages for loss of profits of $206,913.42, although the judge reduced this by $48,000 for the interest they owed the Johnsons for a mortgage on the farm.
