= Butland =

Butland is the surname of the following people:

- Bill Butland (1918–1997), American Major League Baseball pitcher
- Henry Butland (1872–1956), New Zealand rugby union player
- Jack Butland (born 1993), English football goalkeeper
- Jack Butland (industrialist) (1897–1982), New Zealand food manufacturer knighted in the 1966 New Year Honours
- Jeffrey Butland (1950–2004), American politician
- Joanne Butland (born 1978), Australian association football, international rules and Australian rules football player
- Steve Butland (born 1941), Canadian politician

== See also ==
- Paulger v Butland Industries Ltd, a 1989 court case in New Zealand
