= Phillips v Phillips =

- Court: Court of Appeal of New Zealand
- Full case name: Phillips v Phillips
- Decided: 23 February 1993
- Citation: [1993] 3 NZLR 159; (1993) 10 FRNZ 110

Court membership
- Judges sitting: Cooke P, Casey, Gault, McKay JJ

Phillips v Phillips [1993] 3 NZLR 159; (1993) 10 FRNZ 110 is a cited court case in New Zealand, where both parties entering into a contract make the same mistake (often referred to as a common mistake) when a contract is formed, under section 6(1)(a)(ii) of the Contractual Mistakes Act 1977.

== Background ==
Mrs Phillips was in a de facto relation with Mr Phillips for 12 years. They had four children together, and she had worked at several of her husbands businesses. At the breakdown of the relationship, they entered into a separation agreement, which gave Mrs Phillips far less than she was legally entitled to.

However, it was later discovered that such a separation agreement was not legally enforceable, and Mrs Phillips applied to the court to have the separation order set aside under section 6(1)(a)(ii) on the grounds that it was a common mistake, as both parties mistakenly thought that the separation agreement was legally enforceable.

== Held ==
The court ruled that there was a common mistake here, and set aside (cancelled) the previous separation order.
