= Golden Harvest (Pty) Ltd v Zen-Don CC =

South African legal case

Golden Harvest (Pty) Ltd v Zen-Don CC is an important case in South African law, heard in the Orange Free State Provincial Division by Choudree AJ on March 15, 2001, with judgment handed down on August 21. AJR van Rhyn appeared for the applicant; PU Fischer appeared for the respondent.

== Facts ==
By reason of a bona fide mistake made by its legal representatives, the plaintiff was cited in its particulars of claim as "Golden Harvest (Pty) Ltd." It subsequently appeared, however, that the plaintiff was in fact a company, Norris Fresh Produce (Pty) Ltd, which traded as "Golden Harvest." The plaintiff thereupon applied for an amendment in which it sought to substitute for its name as cited the following citation: "Golden Harvest, a business of which the sole proprietor is Norris Fresh Produce (Pty) Ltd."

This amendment was resisted on the following basis:

1. The plaintiff was seeking to introduce a new party to the proceedings by way of an amendment.
2. Because the plaintiff as cited was a non-existent entity, the summons was a nullity.

== Judgment ==
The court held that no attempt was being made to substitute one legal entity for another. There was no question of separate legal entities, but clearly an incorrect description of the original plaintiff, which mistake could be cured by the proposed amendment to the description of the plaintiff. The incorrect description had not rendered the summons invalid, and the proposed amendment would not involve the substitution of one persona for another. The amendment had to be granted accordingly.

== See also ==
- South African law of partnerships and trusts
