= McRae v Commonwealth Disposals Commission =

1951 Australian contract law case

- Court: High Court of Australia
- Citations: [1951] HCA 79, (1951) 84 CLR 377

Case history
- Appealed from: High Court Webb J

Court membership
- Judges sitting: McTiernan, Dixon and Fullagar JJ.

Keywords
- Frustration

McRae v Commonwealth Disposals Commission, is an Australian contract law case, relevant for English contract law, concerning the common mistake about the possibility of performing an agreement.

== Facts ==
The Commonwealth Disposals Commission sold McRae a shipwreck of a tanker on the "Jourmand Reef", near Samarai supposedly containing oil. The McRae brothers went to Samarai and found no tanker, and that there was no such place as the Jourmand Reef. It later became clear that the Commission officer had made a 'reckless and irresponsible' mistake in thinking that they had a tanker to sell (the Court found that they had relied on mere gossip). The McRae brothers incurred considerable expense in fitting out a salvage operation.

The McRae brothers commenced an action claiming damages against the Commission. First they claimed damages for breach of contract to sell a tanker at the location specified. Second, they claimed damages for fraudulent misrepresentation that there was a tanker. Third, they claimed damages for a negligent failure to disclose that there was no tanker at the place specified after the fact became known to the Commissioner. CDC argued there was no liability for breach of contract because it was void given the subject matter did not exist.

Furthermore, in relation to the expenditure incurred by McRae, the CDC argued that “Non constat [It is not clear or evident] that the expenditure incurred by the plaintiffs would not have been equally wasted. If the promise that there was a tanker in situe had been performed, she might still have been found worthless or not susceptible of profitable salvage operations or of any salvage operations at all. How, then… can the plaintiffs say that their expenditure was wasted because there was no tanker in existence?"

== Judgment ==
The High Court of Australia held that McRae succeeded in damages for breach of contract. They rejected the contract was void because CDC had promised the tanker did exist. Courturier v Hastie was distinguished because there the parties had both shared the assumption the corn existed, but here CDC had actually promised the tanker existed and therefore had assumed the risk that it did not.

A general ruling that can be gleaned from the court's judgment is that in circumstances where parties have equal knowledge as to the existence of the subject matter, and it turned out to be false, then it would justify the implication of a condition precedent. In that case, the contract would be void for the failure of the condition precedent, and parties would be restored to their original position. However, in a case where only one party has knowledge of the subject matter (such as the present circumstances), and the other simply relies on what the first party intimates, then there could be no condition precedent. The first party promises or guarantees the existence of the subject matter and will be in breach if it does not exist.

The High Court considered the measure of damages, as this was not a simple case of nondelivery of goods. In opposition to CDC’s argument that McRae’s expenditure was not wasted, Dixon and Fullagar JJ stated: “They [McRae] can say: (1) this expense was incurred; (2) it was incurred because you promised us that there was a tanker; (3) the fact that there was no tanker made it certain that this expense would be wasted. The plaintiffs have in this way a starting-point. They make a prima-facie case. The fact that the expense was wasted flowed prima facie from the fact that there was no tanker; and the first fact is damage, and the second fact is breach of contract."

== See also ==
- English contract law
- Frustration in English law
- Cooper v Phibbs [1867] UKHL 1, (1867) LR 2 HL 149, House of Lords (UK)
