= Amalgamated Investment and Property Co Ltd v John Walker & Sons Ltd =

English contract law case

Amalgamated Investment and Property Co Ltd v John Walker & Sons Lt
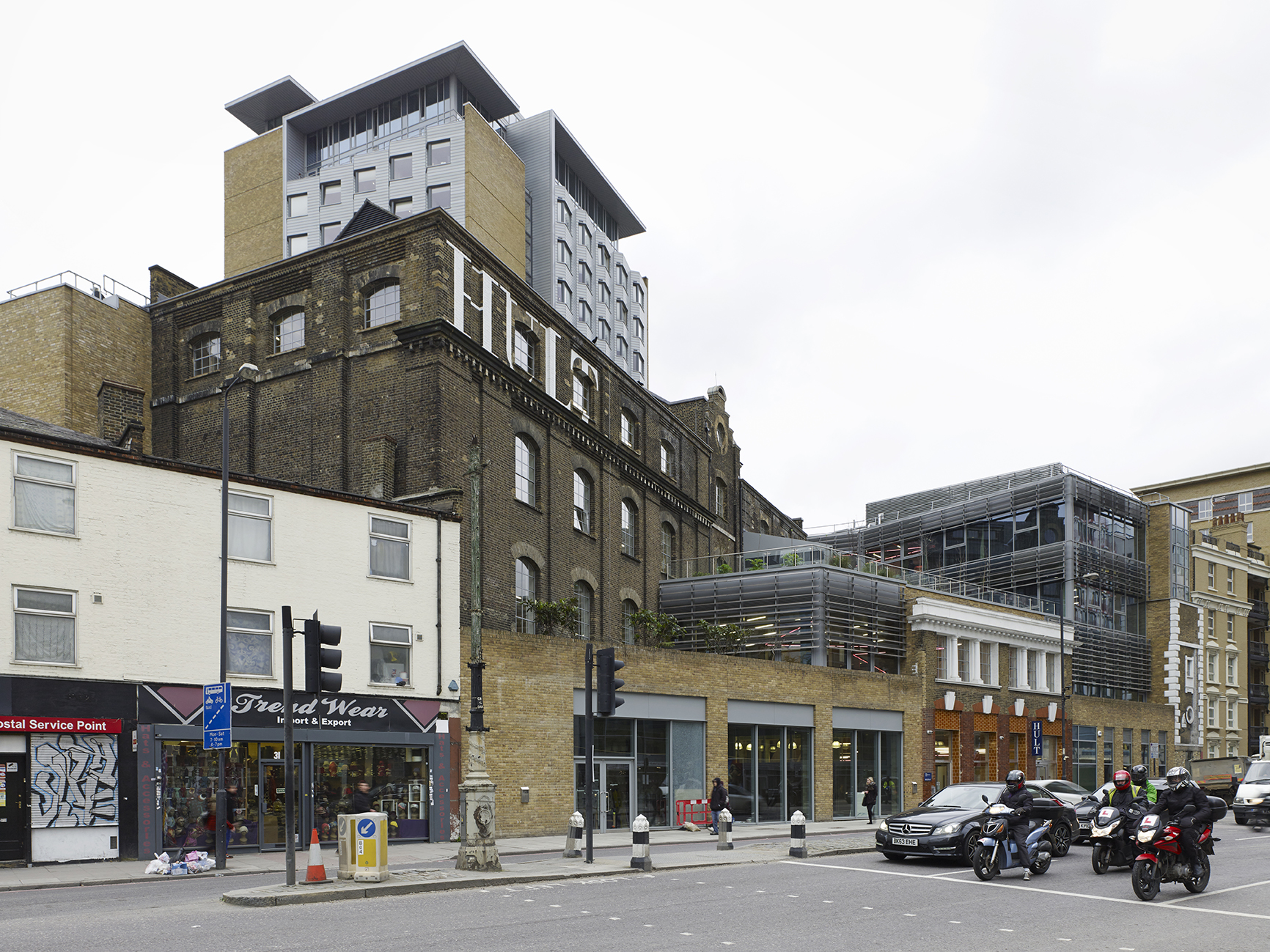
- 33 Commercial Rd, Stepney, London E1 1LD
- Court: Court of Appeal
- Citation: [1977] 1 WLR 164, [1976] 3 All ER 509,[1976] 2 EGLR 153, 239 Estates Gazette 277

Case opinions
- Buckley LJ

Keywords
- Frustration, common mistake

Amalgamated Investment and Property Co Ltd v John Walker & Sons Ltd [1977] 1 WLR 164 is an English contract law case, concerning common mistake and the frustration of an agreement.

== Facts ==
On the 19th of July 1973, John Walker Ltd accepted an offer for £1,710,000 (subject to contract) from Amalgamated Investment Co Ltd for a bonded warehouse and bottling factory, for the purposes of redevelopment.

Amalgamated asked whether the building was designated (or was in the process of being designated) as having historic or of architectural interest (since when buildings are listed, developments are much more complicated, or in some cases impossible). John Walker confirmed (on the 14th of August 1973) that the building was not designated in this way, nor were they aware of any ongoing designation process.

Unfortunately, on the 22nd August the Department of Environment proposed listing the property, but only informed John Walker of this proposal on the 26th of September, and on the 27th of September officially listed the building.

The contract was signed on 25 September, with a completion date of the 28th of December 1973. One of the conditions within the contract was that neither buyer nor seller should be compelled to buy/sell the property if it differed substantially to what had been agreed to be sold/bought (whether by quantity, quality, tenure or otherwise).

The property value dropped to £200,000 (because a listed property which one cannot easily develop is often worth less money). Therefore, on the 12th of December, Amalgamated asked for the contract to be set aside for common mistake, or for frustration, depending on whether the listing took effect before or after 25 September. On 14 December, John Walker asked for specific performance of the contract (compelling Amalgamated to comply with the contract and buy the property), or alternatively a declaration of wrongful repudiation of the contract by Amalgamated (leading to Amalgamated forfeiting their deposit, and having to pay damages).

At the High Court, the judge (Anthony Plowman) held that there was no common mistake, since when the parties had entered into the contract on the 25th of September, the building had not actually been listed (because crucially, listing itself only occurred on the 27th of September). He therefore rejected Amalgamated's claim, and ordered completion of the contract at the full price. Amalgamated appealed the verdict.

== Judgment ==
The Court of Appeal said the listing took effect on 27 September, when the Secretary of State signed the listing papers (and thus common mistake did not apply, since when the contract was signed on the 25th of September, the building was not listed).

However the contract was not frustrated either. It held that Amalgamated had taken on the risk that the building could be listed. This was shown by the nature of their pre-contractual enquiries, and the nature of buying real estate includes the inherent risk of properties being listed. Crucially, there was no term in the contract stating that the purchase was subject to the buyers acquiring planning permission for redevelopment, and as such the listing did not make the contract something radically different from that contemplated by the parties, and so frustration did not apply.

== Subsequent Developments ==
Following the case's verdict, the building was not redeveloped. it was subsequently used by the rag trade, and was also squatted in. Another proposed development in 2006 similarly failed to gain approval. As of 2025, it remains listed, and is part of the London branch of the Hult International Business School.

== See also ==
- English contract law
- Frustration in English law
