= Contractual Mistakes Act 1977 =

Act of Parliament in New Zealand

Contractual Mistakes Act [1977]

New Zealand Parliament
- Long title: An Act to reform the law relating to the effects of mistakes on contracts
- Royal assent: 21 November 1977
- Commenced: 21 November 1977
- Administered by: Ministry of Justice
- Status: Repealed

The Contractual Mistakes Act 1977 was an Act of Parliament in New Zealand that codified into law the remedies for mistake previously available under common law. It was repealed by the Contract and Commercial Law Act 2017.

== Cases ==
- Conlon v Ozolins
- Dennis Friedman (Earthmovers) Ltd v Rodney County Council
- King v Wilkinson
- Mechenex Pacific Services Ltd v TCA Airconditioning (New Zealand) Ltd
- Phillips v Phillips
- Realty Services Holdings Ltd v Slater
- Shotter v Westpac Banking Corp
- Tri-Star Customs and Forwarding Ltd v Denning
- Ware v Johnson
