= Great Peace Shipping Ltd v Tsavliris (International) Ltd =

English contract law case

The Great Peace
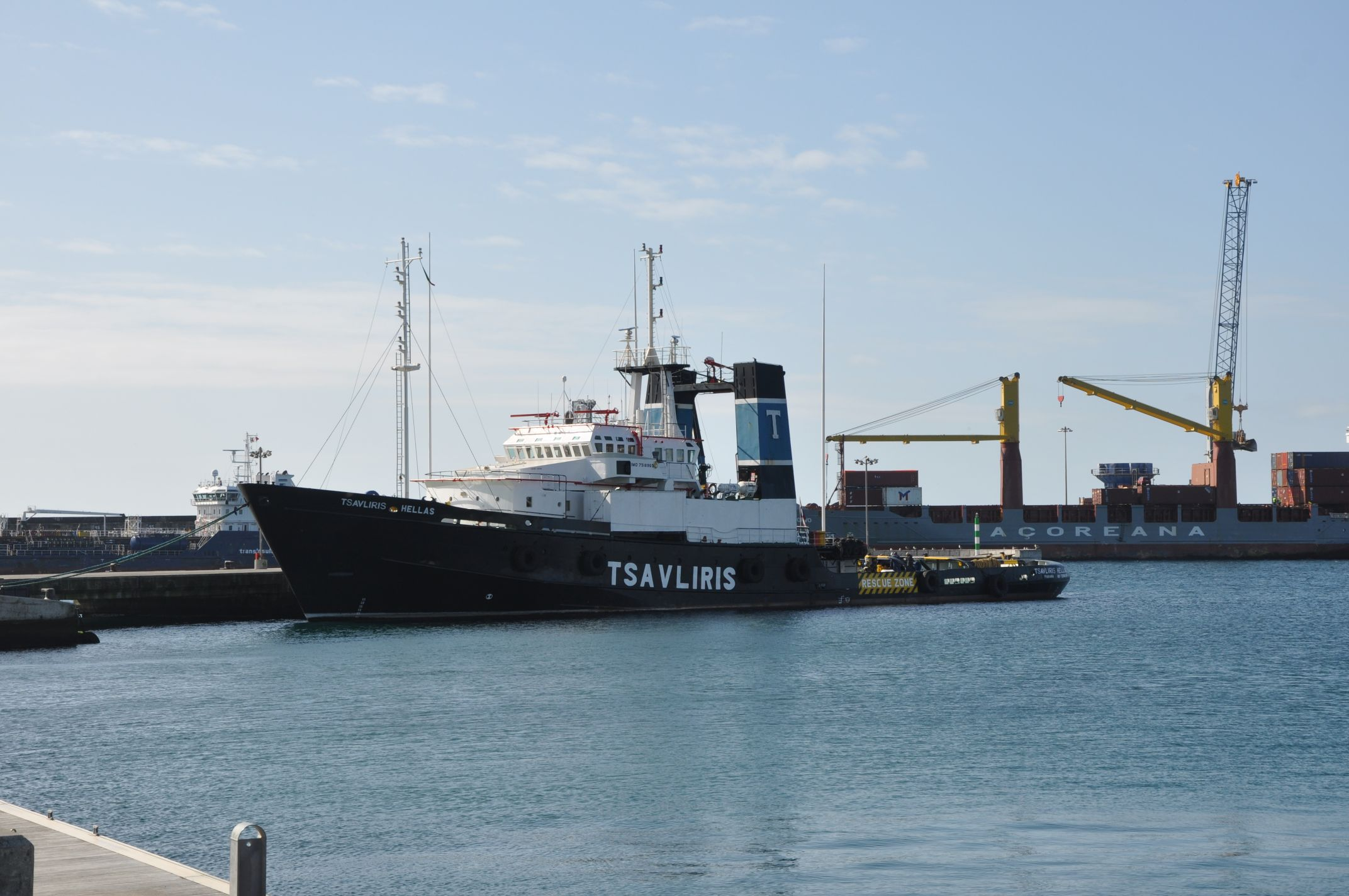
- Court: Court of Appeal
- Full case name: Great Peace Shipping Ltd v Tsavliris (International) Ltd
- Decided: 2002
- Citations: [2002] EWCA Civ 1407, [2003] QB 679

Case opinions
- Lord Phillips of Worth Matravers MR

Keywords
- Frustration and common mistake

Great Peace Shipping Ltd v Tsavliris (International) Ltd [2002] EWCA Civ 1407 (also known as The Great Peace) is a case in English contract law which investigates when a common mistake within a contractual agreement will render it void.

It is notable for its "disapproval" of Solle v Butcher, a 1950 Court of Appeal case in which Lord Denning had established a doctrine of "equitable mistake". Great Peace ruled that the thinking underlying Solle v. Butcher "could not stand in the face of the earlier decision of the House of Lords in Bell v. Lever Bros."

== Facts ==
The defendants, Tsavliris, were professional salvors in the business of maritime salvage and rendering aid to ships in difficulty in the South Indian Ocean. Learning that a vessel named Cape Providence was in trouble, Tsavliris entered into a salvage agreement with the owners on LOF terms. Tsavliris used the Ocean Routes service to try to locate the nearest rescue vessel, and were told that there was one about 35 miles (56 km) away called the Great Peace. Using London brokers called Marint, Tsavliris contacted the Great Peace's owners, and agreement was made to hire the tug for a minimum of five days. It then became apparent that the Great Peace was not 35 miles from the Cape Providence, but 410 miles (660 km) away. Tsavliris then found a closer tug and terminated the contract with Great Peace Ltd, who responded by suing for gross breach of contract. Tsavliris argued it was a common mistake as to the location of the stricken vessel and this invalidated the contract.

== Judgment ==
Lord Phillips of Worth Matravers MR (Note: Lord Phillips was a maritime lawyer who had served his National Service in the Royal Navy, during which time he had been paid a share of a salvage award.) held that the mistake was not sufficiently fundamental to void the contract. The Great Peace would have taken 22 hours to cover 410 miles, but that delay was insufficient to make performance of the contract "essentially different from [the services] the parties envisaged when the contract was concluded".

In the course of the judgment, McRae v Commonwealth Disposals Commission was approved, and Solle v Butcher was disapproved:

76 ... the following elements are necessary before a common mistake will void a contract, through analogy to frustration, from the case, Blakeley v Muller & Co 19 TLR 186, per Lord Alverstone CJ,

(i) there must be a common assumption as to the existence of a state of affairs
(ii) there must be no warranty by either party that that state of affairs exists
(iii) the non-existence of the state of affairs must not be attributable to the fault of either party
(iv) the non-existence of the state of affairs must render performance of the contract impossible
(v) the state of affairs may be the existence, or a vital attribute, of the consideration to be provided or circumstances which must subsist if performance of the contractual adventure is to be possible ...

...

82 ... while we do not consider that the doctrine of common mistake can be satisfactorily explained by an implied term, an allegation that a contract is void for common mistake will often raise important issues of construction. Where it is possible to perform the letter of the contract, but it is alleged that there was a common mistake in relation to a fundamental assumption which renders performance of the essence of the obligation impossible, it will be necessary, by construing the contract in the light of all the material circumstances, to decide whether this is indeed the case…’

...

84 Once the court determines that unforeseen circumstances have, indeed, resulted in the contract being impossible of performance, it is next necessary to determine whether, on true construction of the contract, one or other party has undertaken responsibility for the subsistence of the assumed state of affairs… [or] has undertaken the risk that it may not prove possible to perform…

85 Circumstances where a contract is void as a result of common mistake are likely to be less common than instances of frustration. Supervening events which defeat the contractual adventure will frequently not be the responsibility of either party. Where, however, the parties agree that something shall be done which is impossible at the time of making the agreement, it is much more likely that, on true construction of the agreement, one or other will have undertaken responsibility for the mistaken state of affairs....

...

165 ... the fact that the vessels were considerably further apart than the defendants had believed did not mean that the services that the Great Peace was in a position to provide were essentially different from those which the parties had envisaged when the contract was concluded.

== Comparison with the law on frustration ==
Lord Phillips observed that

Just as the doctrine of frustration only applies if the contract contains no provision that covers the situation, the same should be true of common mistake,

and applied this principle in his ruling. He commented further that

Just as the Law Reform (Frustrated Contracts) Act 1943 was needed to temper the effect of the common law doctrine of frustration, so there is scope for legislation to give greater flexibility to our law of mistake than the common law allows.

== See also ==
- English contract law
- Frustration in English law
- Cooper v Phibbs [1867] UKHL 1, (1867) LR 2 HL 149
