= Raffles v Wichelhaus =

Case of mutual mistake in English contract law

The Peerless
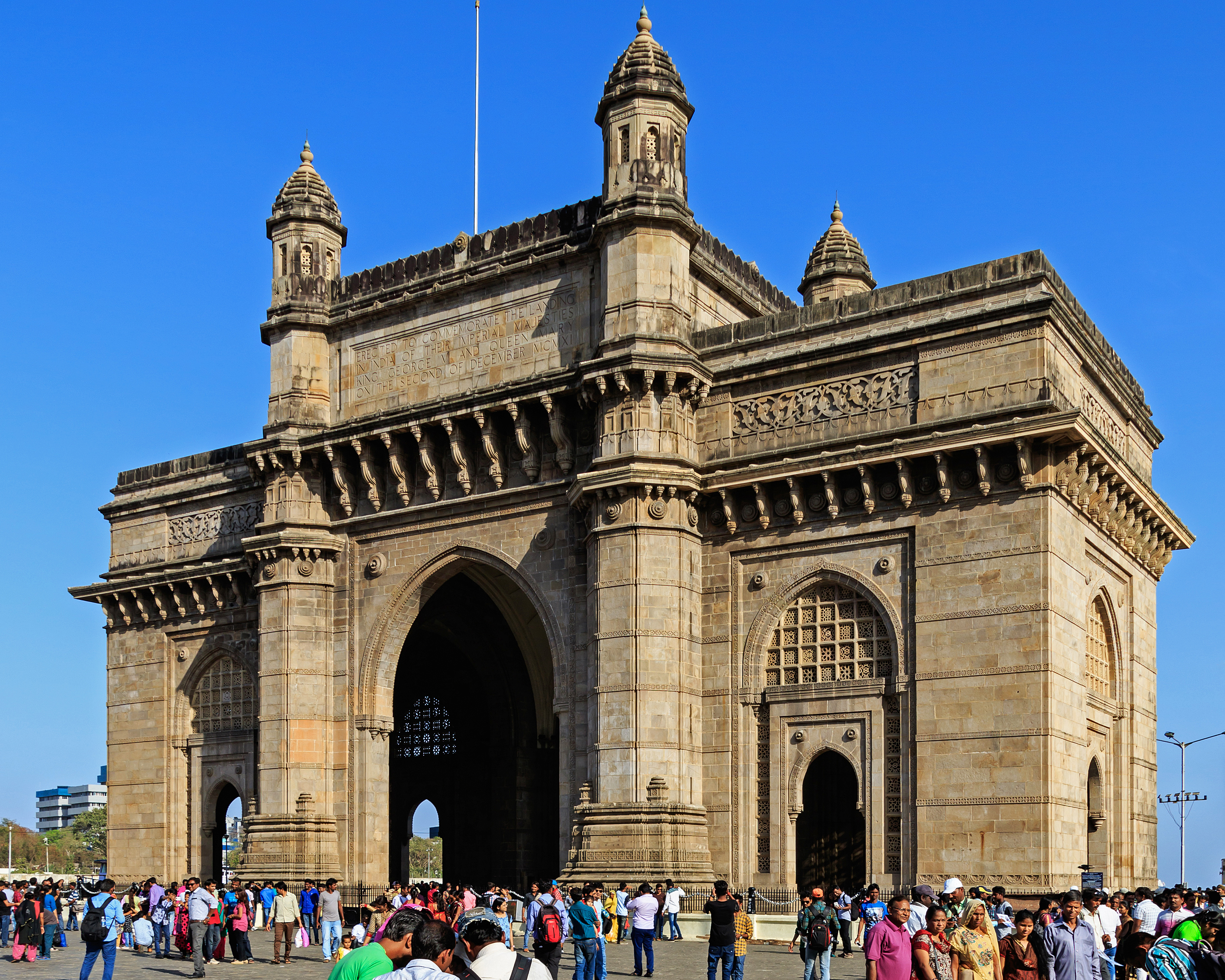
- The Gateway of India, Bombay
- Court: Court of Exchequer
- Decided: 20 January 1864
- Citations: [1864] EWHC Exch J19, (1864) 2 Hurl & C 906

Court membership
- Judges sitting: Pollock CB, Martin B and Pigott B

Keywords
- Mutual mistake

Raffles v Wichelhaus [1864] EWHC Exch J19, often called "The Peerless" case, is a leading case on mutual mistake in English contract law. Parties to an agreement for the sale of cotton coming aboard a ship named Peerless later realized that they intended different vessels. Despite the rule that courts will pursue a reasonable interpretation of ambiguous contractual terms based on their context, this agreement was held to lack the meeting of the minds necessary for formation of an enforceable contract.

== Background ==
Plaintiff Raffles entered into a contract to sell 125 bales of Surat cotton at fair market price to the defendant, Wichelhaus, at the rate of 17 1/4 d. per pound. The contract specified that the cotton would be arriving in Liverpool on the ship Peerless from Bombay ("to arrive ex Peerless from Bombay").

Unbeknownst to either party, there were two ships named Peerless arriving in Liverpool from Bombay, one departing in October and another in December. The defendant thought the contract was for cotton on the October ship, while the claimant intended the December ship. When the December Peerless arrived, Raffles tried to deliver it, but Wichelhaus repudiated the agreement by claiming that their contract was for the cotton on the October Peerless, prompting a suit for breach of contract.

== Judgment ==
While Raffles' counsel tried arguing that the date of delivery was irrelevant to the contract, such that the ship was only named to communicate that the seller assumed the financial risk of the goods being lost at sea, the judges were unreceptive. Finding that there was no meeting of the minds, the Exchequer of Pleas held that the parties never reached the necessary agreement for contract formation due to their mutual mistake as to the meaning of "Peerless" in their contract. Accordingly, the judges granted the defendant's demurrer to have the case dismissed.

== Legacy ==
Raffles is typically used in countries following English common law to explain the doctrine of mutual mistake. This prominence has been criticized since Wichelhaus never claimed that the time of delivery was a material aspect of the contract. Since they would have therefore accepted their allegedly intended ship arriving at the same time as the other Peerless, it appears that the defendant was only repudiating because cotton prices had sharply dropped by the time the later ship arrived in Liverpool.

== See also ==
- Mistakes in English law
- Interpreting contracts in English law
