= Couturier v Hastie =

1856 English contract law case

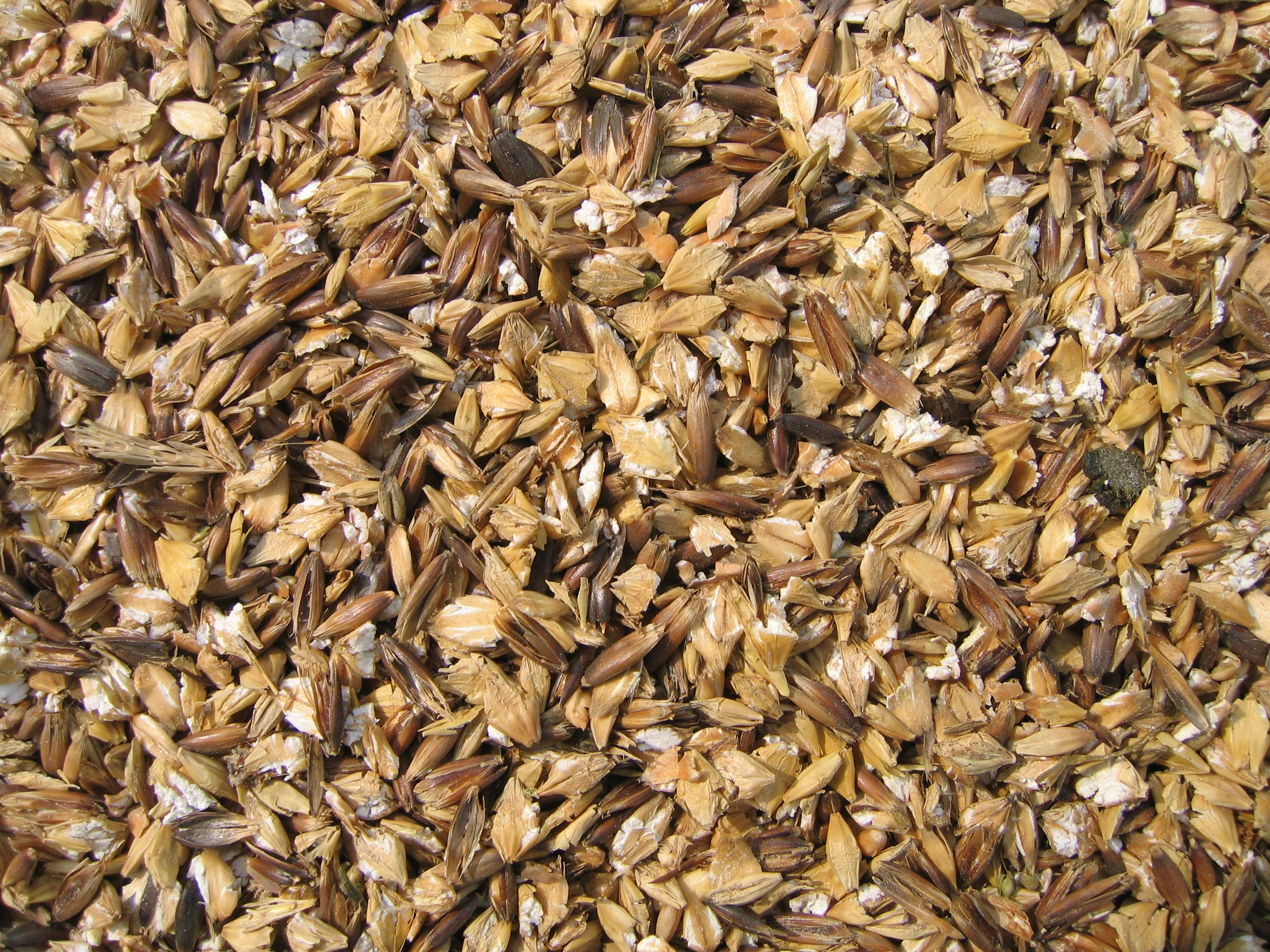
- Court: House of Lords
- Full case name: Gustavus Couturier & others v Robert Hastie & another
- Citations: [1856] UKHL J3, (1856) 5 HLC 673

Court membership
- Judges sitting: Baron Alderson, Justice Wightman, Justice Creswell, Justice Erle, Justice Williams, Baron Martin, Justice Crompton, Justice Willes, Baron Bramwell

Keywords
- Frustration, common mistake

Couturier v Hastie [1856] UKHL J3 is an English contract law case, concerning common mistake between two contracting parties about the possibility of performance of an agreement.

== Facts ==
Couturier agreed with Hastie to deliver some corn. They thought it was in transit between Salonica (now Thessaloniki) and the UK. But the corn had already decayed. The shipmaster had sold it. Couturier argued that Hastie was liable for the corn because Hastie had already bought an "interest in the adventure", or rights under the shipping documents.

== Judgment ==
The House of Lords held that because the corn effectively did not exist at the time of the contract, there was presence consideration and the buyers were not liable to pay the price. Lord Cranworth LC said:

The whole question turns upon the construction of the contract ... Looking to the contract ... alone it appears to me clearly that what the parties contemplated ... was that there was an existing something to be sold and bought.

== See also ==
- English contract law
- Frustration in English law
- Sale of Goods Act 1979 s 6
- McRae v Commonwealth Disposals Commission [1951] HCA 79, (1951) 84 CLR 377, High Court (Australia).
