= Tri-Star Customs and Forwarding Ltd v Denning =

Court case

- Court: Court of Appeal of New Zealand
- Full case name: Tri-Star Customs and Forwarding Ltd v Denning
- Decided: 2 July 1998
- Citation: [1999] 1 NZLR 33

Court membership
- Judges sitting: Richardson P, Henry, Thomas, Keith, and Tipping JJ

Tri-Star Customs and Forwarding Ltd v Denning [1999] 1 NZLR 33 is a cited case in New Zealand regarding unilateral mistakes under the Contractual Mistakes Act 1977.

== Background ==
The Dennings leased a commercial building to Tristar. A condition of the lease agreement, gave Tristar the right to purchase the building for $720,000. An option that Tristar later accepted.

However, whilst the lease agreement clearly stated that the rentals were GST exclusive, the purchase price of $720,000 was silent regarding whether it was exclusive or inclusive of GST.

This was unfortunate for the Dennings, as under NZ tax law, it was deemed that it was GST inclusive, although they successfully obtained relief in the High Court.

Tristar appealed.

== Held ==
A bench of five of the Court Appeal ruled that the Contractual Mistakes Act 1977 requires that Tristar had actual knowledge of the mistake at the time, and not merely "ought to of known" of the mistake as was the old common law standard. Henry J stated "It may of course be proper for the Court to infer actual knowledge from proved circumstances, even if the person in question denies having that knowledge".
