= Cundy v Lindsay =

English contract law case

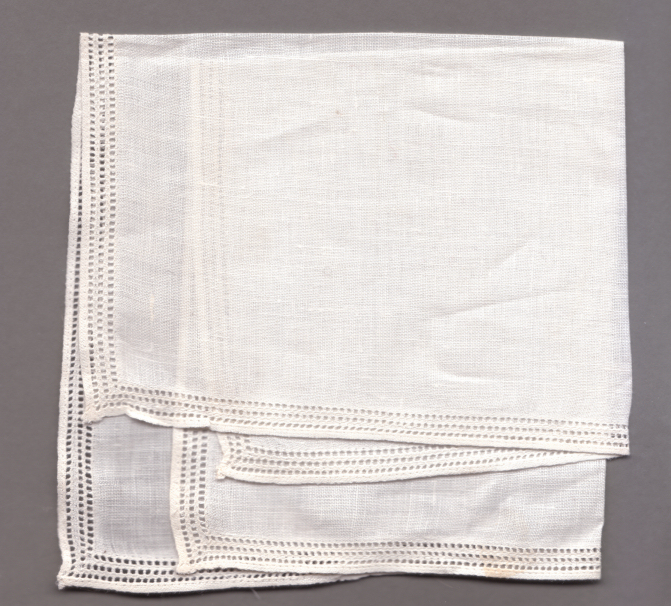
- Did a contract for the sale of linen handkerchiefs exist when one party had mistaken the identity of the other?
- Court: House of Lords
- Decided: 4 March 1878
- Citation: (1877-78) LR 3 App Cas 459; [1874-80] All ER Rep 1149

Keywords
- Mistake as to identity, void

Cundy v Lindsay (1877–78) LR 3 App Cas 459 is an English contract law case on the subject of mistake, introducing the concept that contracts could be automatically void for mistake as to identity, where it is of crucial importance. Some lawyers argue that such a rule is at odds with subsequent cases of mistake as to identity, such as Phillips v Brooks, where parties contracting face to face are merely voidable for fraud, protecting a third party buyer. However, the ultimate question is whether the identity of the other contracting party was crucial to the contract. The problem for the courts was essentially which of the two innocent parties should bear the loss of the goods.

== Facts ==
Lindsay & Co sued Cundy to return handkerchiefs, after it had been defrauded by a 'rogue' that sold them onto Cundy. Lindsay & Co were manufacturers of linen handkerchiefs, amongst other things. They received correspondence from a man named Blenkarn. He had rented a room at 37 Wood Street, Cheapside, but purported to be 'Blenkiron & Co'. Lindsay & Co knew of a reputable business of this name which resided at 123 Wood Street. Believing the correspondence to be from this company, Lindsay & Co delivered to Blenkarn a large order of handkerchiefs. Blenkarn then sold the goods – 250 dozen linen handkerchiefs – to an innocent third party, Cundy. When Blenkarn failed to pay, Lindsay & Co sued Cundy for the goods.

== Judgment ==
=== Divisional Court ===
The Divisional Court held that Lindsay could not recover the handkerchiefs from Cundy. Blackburn J, giving judgment, held the following.

The rule of law has been thoroughly established—the cases are numerous, and I need not cite them—that where a contract is voidable on the ground of fraud, you may avoid it, so long as the goods remain in the man's hands who is guilty of the fraud, or in the hands of anybody who takes them from him with notice; but where a person has bonâ fide acquired an interest in the goods, you cannot, as against that person, avoid the contract. Where the goods have come into the hands of a bonâ fide purchaser you cannot take them back. The case is very closely analogous to the old common-law rule, in the case of felony or trespass. If goods are stolen or taken away by trespass, no title whatever is conferred, in general, upon a purchaser from the person who took them, however bonâ fide the purchase may have been; but if the sale be in market overt to a person who has no knowledge of the felony or trespass, then the purchaser acquires the property, notwithstanding the goods had been taken from the owner by felony or trespass.

Mellor J and Lush J agreed.

=== Court of Appeal ===
The Court of Appeal, with Mellish LJ, Brett J and Amphlett JA overturned the Divisional Court, holding that Lindsay could recover the handkerchiefs, since the mistake about the identity of the rogue voided the contract from the start. Cundy appealed.

=== House of Lords ===
The House of Lords held that Lindsay & Co had meant to deal only with Blenkiron & Co. There could therefore have been no agreement or contract between them and the rogue. Accordingly, title did not pass to the rogue, and could not have passed to Cundy. He therefore had to return the goods.

Lord Cairns explained the mistake as to identity, and the consequences:

Now, my Lords, stating the matter shortly in that way, I ask the question, how is it possible to imagine that in that state of things any contract could have arisen between the Respondents and Blenkarn, the dishonest man? Of him they knew nothing, and of him they never thought. With him they never intended to deal. Their minds never, even for an instant of time rested upon him, and as between him and them there was no consensus of mind which could lead to any agreement or any contract whatever. As between him and them there was merely the one side to a contract, where, in order to produce a contract, two sides would be required. With the firm of Blenkiron & Co. of course there was no contract, for as to them the matter was entirely unknown, and therefore the pretence of a contract was a failure.

== Developments ==
The contract was held void, rather than voidable. This has introduced a distinction from cases such as Phillips v Brooks, where parties dealing face to face are presumed to contract with each other. Despite still being good law, commentators, as well as the courts, have been critical of this distinction. In Shogun Finance Ltd v Hudson Lord Nicholls, dissenting, stated it to be an "eroded" principle of law.

The distinction in outcome thus drawn between these two kinds of fraudulent misrepresentation, one as to 'attributes' and the other as to 'identity', is unconvincing. It has been described as a reproach to the law. To a considerable extent the distinction has now been eroded. Cundy v Lindsay was decided over a century ago, and since then there have been significant developments in this area of case law. Unfortunately these developments have left the law in a state of disarray. The question before the House on this appeal is whether this distinction, so far as it remains, should still be regarded as good law.

== See also ==
- King's Norton Metal Co v Edridge Merrett & Co
- Mistake in English law
