= Dennis Friedman (Earthmovers) Ltd v Rodney County Council =

Dennis Freidman (Earthmovers) Ltd v Rodney County Council
- Court: High Court of New Zealand
- Full case name: Dennis Friedman (Earthmovers) Ltd v Rodney County Council
- Decided: 18 August 1987
- Citation: [1988] 1 NZLR 184

Court membership
- Judge sitting: Smellie J

Dennis Friedman (Earthmovers) Ltd v Rodney County Council [1988] 1 NZLR 184 is a cited case in New Zealand regarding where both parties enter into contract due to a mistake covered under the Contractual Mistakes Act 1977, that under section 6(1)(c), the risk must not have been assumed by the parties when the contract was entered into.

== Background ==
Dennis Friedman Earthmovers, won a tender from the Rodney County Council to excavate 19,000 cubic metres of materials for a new reservoir near Orewa, and deposit and compact these materials on nearby land. Part of the tender conditions, was that the placed the risk of the soil conditions on the tenderer.

Once the earthworks had started, the excavated materials were discovered to have a higher water content than stated in the tender documents.

As a result, DFA sought an increase in the contract for $26,500, which the council refused to pay.

The matter was referred to arbitration, which DFA lost, and they appealed to the High Court, seeking relief for mistake.

== Held ==
The court ruled the council not liable, as the tender document put all such risk on DFA.
