= Legal nullity =

Entity that lacks legal significance

Legal nullity refers to any entity which theoretically is, or might be, of some legal significance, but in fact lacks any identity or distinct structure of its own.

== Institutional bodies ==
The usual examples are counties (or equivalent sub-regional groupings) which are wholly subsumed by the municipal government within their boundaries.

Some entities which fit this description are Philadelphia County, a legal nullity because it is entirely coterminous with the city of Philadelphia, Pennsylvania, and New York County, which is similarly coterminous with the Borough of Manhattan, in New York City (as each of the five Boroughs of New York City is coterminous with a county). Similarly, the eight counties of Connecticut have only a shadow existence: virtually all of their governmental functions were abolished in 1960, the rest in 2000. Their historic boundaries are used only to organize certain state level police and judicial districts.

These areas are of relatively little legal import, since there is a generally agreed overarching legal coverage. The issue is of greater significance when a significant power is technically under the overarching body's power but has been external from that control for so long that it is generally accepted as to have little consequence. Kosovo is one particular case, as from many countries' viewpoints, it doesn't exist as a country. However it has a well-established legal system without any other party effectively stating control over the region (and no likelihood of that changing in the anticipated future). For the 80 countries that don't recognise its independence, but wish to participate with the country (trade, security etc.), then functioning with Kosovo's legal system is necessary. This means functionally ignoring a legal system of significance, from their point of view. The same can be said of several other long-disputed "de facto" States, where necessity drives rejecting the participation of a legally significant legal system.

== Jurisdiction ==
Legal nullity is also a court decision made without jurisdiction or authority. Such a decision does not have to be vacated or appealed, it is void from inception.

== See also ==
- Void (law)
