= Pottier =

Pottier is a surname. Notable people with the surname include:

- Edmond Pottier (1855–1934), German-born French art historian and archaeologist
- Édouard Pottier (1839–1903), French admiral
- Eugène Edine Pottier (1816–1887), French revolutionary, anarchist, poet, freemason, and transport worker
- Philippe Pottier (1938–1985), Swiss footballer
- René Pottier (1879–1907), French racing cyclist
- Richard Pottier (1906–1994), Austrian-born French film director

== See also ==
- Potier
- Potter (surname)
