= Potier =

Potier is a surname, meaning potter. Notable people with the surname include:

- Alfred Potier (1840–1905), French polymath
- Benoît Potier (born 1957), French businessman
- Charles Potier (1806–1870), French actor and playwright
- Dominique Potier (born 1954), French politician
- Edgard Potier (1903–1944), Belgian military officer
- Jérôme Potier (born 1962), French former tennis player
- Joseph Potier (1768—1830), French privateer
- Paul Potier (born 1954), Canadian professional pool player
- Pierre Potier (1934–2006), French pharmacist
- Pierre-Philippe Potier (1708–1781), Belgian Jesuit priest and lexicographer
- Suki Potier (1947–1981), English model

== See also ==
- Pottier
- Potter (name)
- House of Potier
