= Cooper v Phibbs =

1867 UK contract law case

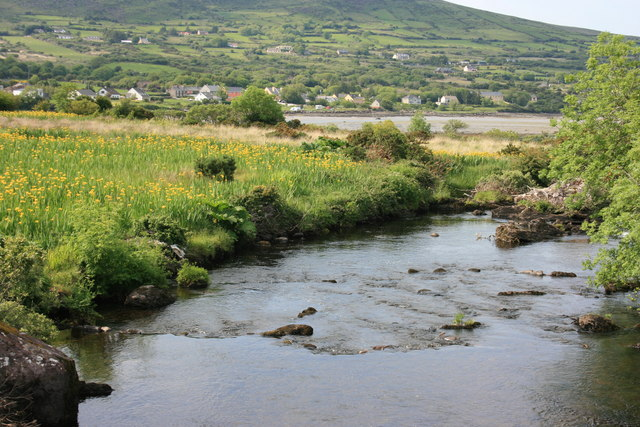
- Owenmore River at Ballysadare, Ireland, near Cooper's salmon fishery
- Court: House of Lords
- Decided: 31 May 1867
- Citations: [1867] UKHL 1, (1867) LR 2 HL 149

Keywords
- Contract, mistake

Cooper v Phibbs [1867] UKHL 1 is an English contract law case, concerning the doctrine of mistake.

== Facts ==
Cooper's uncle, not intending to misrepresent anything, but being in fact in error, told Cooper that he (the uncle) was entitled to a fishery. Cooper, after his uncle's death, acting in the belief of the truth of what his uncle had told him, entered into an agreement to rent the fishery from the uncle's daughters. However, the fishery actually belonged to Cooper himself. After the uncle died, the lease was renewed through Cooper's aunt, via her three daughters, Cooper's cousins, and Mr Phibbs acting as their agent. The aunt, three sisters, and Cooper, had all assumed that they were entitled to the land through a right of inheritance. In fact, Cooper was truly entitled to an equitable residual interest, because the uncle in his will had granted Cooper a life tenancy. When the sisters asked for the next rental payment, this had transpired and Cooper sought a declaration that he was the owner and that the lease was not enforceable.

== Judgment ==
The House of Lords held that the contract was voidable at Mr Cooper’s instance, on the basis of a mistake that it was possible for the aunt and sisters to lease the land to Mr Cooper. Since Mr Cooper was the true beneficial owner, in equity, it was impossible for a lease to be granted to him in law.

Lord Cranworth said the following.

The consequence was, that the present Appellant, when, after the death of his uncle, he entered into the agreement to take a lease of this property, entered into an agreement to take a lease of what was, in truth, his own property – for, in truth, this fishery was bound by the covenant, and belonged to him, just as much as did the lands of Ballysadare; therefore, he says, I entered into the agreement under a common mistake, and I am entitled to be relieved from the consequence of it.

In support of that proposition he relied upon a case which was decided in the time of Lord Hardwicke, not by Lord Hardwicke himself, but by the then Master of the Rolls, Bingham v. Bingham, where that relief was expressly administered. I believe that the doctrine there acted upon was perfectly correct doctrine; but even if it had not been, that will not at all shew that this Appellant is not entitled to this relief, because in this case the Appellant was led into the mistake by the misinformation given to him by his uncle, who is now represented by the Respondents. It is stated by him in his Cause Petition, which is verified, and to which there is no contradiction, and in all probability it seems to be the truth, that his uncle told him, not intending to misrepresent anything, but being in fact in error, that he was entitled to this fishery as his own fee simple property; and the Appellant, his nephew, after his death acting on the belief of the truth of what his uncle had so told him, entered into the agreement in question. It appears to me, therefore, that it is impossible to say that he is not entitled to the relief which he asks, namely, to have the agreement delivered up and the rent repaid. That being so, he would be entitled to relief, but he is only entitled to this relief on certain terms ...

...

... what are the terms upon which this relief is to be given? Now, the Respondents allege that their father, Edward Joshua, in making the canals and other works necessary for establishing the fishery, and also in purchasing up fishery rights in the bay, expended very large sums of money.

First of all he was at the expense of obtaining the Act of Parliament. ... He was at great expense in purchasing up the rights of fishery of different proprietors on the banks, and he was at very large expense in making cuts and removing obstructions, so as to make the fishery available. That, at least, is the allegation of the Respondents. Now, if that is so, the question is, upon what terms ought this relief to be granted? It is impossible to decide the merits of this claim in the absence of the persons entitled to the corpus of the estate. ... justice would not be done to them if we were to give relief to the Appellant by simply setting aside the agreement on which they claim a lien. They have a right to have that question disposed of. I submit to your Lordships, therefore, that all that we can do is to remit the case to the Court of Chancery in Ireland, with declarations which shall enable the parties to have this question properly decided.

Lord Westbury agreed, and expressed the issues as follows:

The result, therefore, is, that at the time of the agreement for the lease which it is the object of this Petition to set aside, the parties dealt with one another under a mutual mistake as to their respective rights. The Petitioner did not suppose that he was, what in truth he was, tenant for life of the fishery. The other parties acted upon the impression given to them by their father, that he (their father) was the owner of the fishery, and that the fishery had descended to them. In such a state of things there can be no doubt of the rule of a Court of Equity with regard to the dealing with that agreement. It is said, "" but in that maxim the word "jus" is used in the sense of denoting general law, the ordinary law of the country. But when the word "jus" is used in the sense of denoting a private right, that maxim has no application. Private right of ownership is a matter of fact; it may be the result also of matter of law; but if parties contract under a mutual mistake and misapprehension as to their relative and respective rights, the result is, that that agreement is liable to be set aside as having proceeded upon a common mistake. Now, that was the case with these parties – the Respondents believed themselves to be entitled to the property, the Petitioner believed that he was a stranger to it, the mistake is discovered, and the agreement cannot stand. But then, when the Appellant comes here to set aside the agreement, an obligation lies upon him so to constitute his suit as to enable a Court of Equity to deal with the whole of the subject-matter, and once for all to dispose of the rights and interests of the parties in the settlement. Now although the agreement was inoperative for the purpose of giving to the Petitioner a valid lease of the property, yet it might operate to this extent, that so far as the Respondents had in equity a lien upon the property, their estates and interests in respect of that lien might be affected by the agreement. And there is another particular also which must be noticed, which for the moment, I think, in the preparation of these minutes, has escaped our attention, namely, that unquestionably the Respondents were entitled to the cottage and to the piece of land, upon which no rent has been paid. But, during the time that has elapsed, I understand the fact to be, that the Petitioner has had the possession and enjoyment of that cottage and of that piece of land. In respect of those particulars, therefore, a proper occupation rent ought to be paid by him.

Lord Colonsay concurred.

== Significance ==
The case has been seen as an example of how a contract will be unenforceable if there is a mistake by both parties about the possibility, in law, to perform a contract. This doctrine of mistake in equity was expanded upon by Denning LJ in Solle v Butcher, which emphasised that mistakes in equity would render a contract voidable (at the instance of the claimant), rather than void. However, mistake in equity was held to have been abolished in The Great Peace. This remains a point of controversy.
