= Paulger v Butland Industries Ltd =

New Zealand law case

- Court: Court of Appeal of New Zealand
- Full case name: Morris John Paulger v Butland Industries Limited
- Decided: 25 October 1989
- Citation: [1989] 3 NZLR 549
- Transcript: Court of Appeal judgment

Court membership
- Judges sitting: Somers P, Hardie Boys, Wylie J

Paulger v Butland Industries Ltd [1989] 3 NZLR 549 is a cited case in New Zealand regarding mutual mistake.

== Background ==
Dingwall and Paulger Ltd ran a wholesale grocery business in New Zealand under the Foodland, Keystore, and Price Cutter brands.

Paulger retired as director of Dingwall and Paulger in 1980, but in 1982 came out of retirement to help the company out of the financial difficulties it had subsequently found itself in.

To resolve this, the company agreed to sell part of the company to Magnum Corporation, and to placate its creditors until the sale proceeds were received, Paulger sent the following letter to all its creditors:

TO ALL CREDITORS OF DINGWALL AND PAULGER LIMITED

This letter serves as advice of intention to make payments to all creditors of the Company as soon as possible.

As you may be aware Magnum Corporation have purchased the Grocery interests of our Company and until finalised, we are unable to release payments.

We ask your tolerance whilst we execute this matter and advise we will make good all outstanding matters within 90 days.

The writer personally guarantees that all due payments will be made. Thank you for your consideration in this matter.

Yours Sincerely, Dingwall and Paulger Limited,

(Signed) M.J. Paulger

CHIEF EXECUTIVE"

Butland Industries were owed $10,922.98 and waited the 90 days, refraining from legal action in enforcing payment. Unfortunately, things did not go to plan, as the firm was placed into receivership, with the sale proceeds being diverted to the secured creditors, leaving the unsecured creditors unpaid.

Butland sued Paulger personally, claiming his letter made him personally liable. Paulger argued that he did not intend his letter to make him personally liable for all $7 million of the company debts, and claimed it was a common mistake.

== Held ==
The Court of Appeal ruled that there was no common mistake here, making Paulger personally liable.
