= Void (law) =

Absence of legal effect

In law, void means of no legal effect. An action, document, or transaction which is void is of no legal effect whatsoever: an absolute nullity—the law treats it as if it had never existed or happened. The term void ab initio, which means "to be treated as invalid from the outset", comes from adding the Latin phrase ab initio (from the beginning) as a qualifier. For example, in many jurisdictions where a person signs a contract under duress, that contract is treated as being void ab initio. The frequent combination "null and void" is a legal doublet.

The term is frequently used in contradistinction to the term "voidable" and "unenforceable".

== Definitions ==
Black's Law Dictionary defines 'void' as "[n]ull; ineffectual; nugatory; having no legal force or binding effect...." In the case of a contract, this means there is no legal obligation, therefore there can be no breach of contract since the contract is null, but there may be an implied contract which requires the recipient of goods or services provided to pay their reasonable value.

A contract that is void is no longer legally enforceable. A contract may be voidable if there are grounds upon which a party to the contract may avoid or disaffirm their duties of performance, but does not become void until that option is exercised. A contract is void ab initio, or from the beginning, if it is for an illegal purpose or if it offends public policy, and such a contract may not be enforced through the courts.

== Significance ==
The significance of this usually lies in the possibility of third party rights being acquired in good faith. For example, in Cundy v Lindsay (1878), a fraudster using the name Blenkarn posed as a retailer and induced Lindsay & Co to deliver 250 dozen linen handkerchiefs to him. Blenkarn then sold the handkerchiefs on to an innocent third party, Cundy, but Lindsay was never paid. Lindsay, claiming ownership of the handkerchiefs, sued Cundy for their return. If the contract of sale to Blenkarn was held to be voidable for fraud, then Lindsay & Co would only have recourse against the insolvent Blenkarn. However, if (as was held) the contract of sale was void ab initio, then the title did not pass from Lindsay to Blenkarn in the first place, and Lindsay could claim back the handkerchiefs from Cundy as their property. Cundy was left with only a claim against the insolvent Blenkarn.

In every case, third parties involved with bad faith in void or voidable contracts not only are affected by nullity, but may also be liable for statutory damages.

However, the right to avoid a voidable transaction can be lost (usually lost by delay). These are sometimes referred to as "bars to rescission". Such considerations do not apply to matters affected by absolute nullity, or void ab initio.

== See also ==
- Legal nullity
