= Voidable =

Valid but may be annulled by a party to the transaction

Voidable, in law, is a transaction or action that is valid but may be annulled by one of the parties to the transaction. Voidable is usually used in distinction to void ab initio (or void from the outset) and unenforceable.

== Definition ==
The act of invalidating the contract by the party exercising its rights to annul the voidable contract is usually referred to either as voiding the contract (in the United States and Canada) or avoiding the contract (in the United Kingdom, Australia and other common law countries).

Black's Law Dictionary (relevant to US law) defines voidable as follows:

Voidable. That which may be avoided, or declared void; not absolutely void, or void in itself. It imports a valid act which may be avoided rather than an invalid act which may be ratified. United States v Price, D.C. Iowa, 514 F.Supp. 477,480

== Right to rescind ==
Generally speaking, one party will have the right to elect whether to annul the transaction or to affirm it. The avoiding of a voidable transaction amounts to the rescinding it or exercising a power of rescission and as such, it is subject to the general law in that regard.

The right to rescind can be lost. In common law, there are generally said to be four "bars" to rescission, any one of which will cause the agreement to no longer be considered voidable:

1. delay
2. affirmation (or ratification)
3. restitutio in integrum being impossible
4. third party rights

Although the law varies from country to country, most disputes relating to whether a transaction is void or voidable turn on the ability to transfer title to goods. In many jurisdictions, if a transaction is valid, but voidable, title to good still passes under the transaction, and the recipient may sell them with good title. If the transaction is void, no title passes, and the original seller may reclaim the goods.

== See also ==
- Per minas
- Voidable marriage
- Voidable contract
- Void (law)
