= Mistake (contract law) =

Concept in contract law

In contract law, a mistake is an erroneous belief, at contracting, that certain facts are true. It can be argued as a defense, and if raised successfully, can lead to the agreement in question being found void ab initio or voidable, or alternatively, an equitable remedy may be provided by the courts. Common law has identified three different types of mistake in contract: the 'unilateral mistake', the 'mutual mistake', and the 'common mistake'. The distinction between the 'common mistake' and the 'mutual mistake' is important.

Another breakdown in contract law divides mistakes into four traditional categories: unilateral mistake, mutual mistake, mistranscription, and misunderstanding.

The law of mistake in any given contract is governed by the law governing the contract. The law from country to country can differ significantly. For instance, contracts entered into under a relevant mistake have not been voidable in English law since Great Peace Shipping Ltd v Tsavliris (International) Ltd (2002).

== Examples ==
Mistake can be mistake of law, or mistake of fact.

=== Mistake of law ===
Mistake of law is when a party enters into a contract without the knowledge of the law in the country. The contract is affected by such mistakes, but it is not void. The reason here is that ignorance of law is not an excuse. However, if a party is induced to enter into a contract by the mistake of law then such a contract is not valid.

For example, Harjoth and Danny make a contract grounded on the erroneous belief that a particular debt is barred by the Indian law of Limitation; the contract is not voidable.

=== Mistake of fact ===
Mistake of fact is when both parties enter into agreement under a mistake as to a matter of fact essential to the agreement. This renders the agreement voidable.

An erroneous opinion as to the value of the thing which forms the subject matter of the agreement is not to be deemed a mistake as to a matter of fact. For example, a woman finds a stone and sells it as a topaz. It was a raw uncut diamond worth hundreds of times the selling price. The contract is not voidable. There was no mistake because neither party knew what the stone was. Conversely, in a case where a person sells a cow for $80 because they think it is infertile and the cow turns out to be pregnant and worth $1000, the contract would be void.

== Unilateral mistakes ==
A unilateral mistake is where only one party to a contract is mistaken about the terms or subject-matter contained in a contract. This kind of mistake is more common than other types of mistake. One must first distinguish between mechanical calculations and business errors when looking at unilateral mistake.

Ordinarily, unilateral mistake does not make a contract void. Traditionally this is caveat emptor (let the buyer beware), and under common law caveat venditor (let the seller beware).

=== Exceptions ===
A contract might be voidable from unilateral mistake for any of the following:

1. One party relied on a statement of the other about a material fact that the second party knew or should have known was mistaken by the first party.
2. "clerical error that did not result in gross negligence"
  - For mechanical calculations, a party may be able to set aside the contract on these grounds provided that the other party does not try to take advantage of the mistake, or 'snatch up' the offer (involving a bargain that one did not intend to make, betrayed by an error in arithmetic, etc.). This will be seen by an objective standard, or if a reasonable person would be able to know that the mistake would not make sense to one of the parties. Unless one of the parties 'snatched up' the one-sided offer, courts will otherwise uphold the contract.
3. The mistake was "unconscionable", i.e., so serious and unreasonable to be outrageous.

== Mutual mistake ==
A mutual mistake occurs when the parties to a contract are both mistaken about the same material fact within their contract. They are at cross purposes. There is a meeting of the minds, but the parties are mistaken. Hence the contract is voidable. Collateral mistakes will not afford the right of rescission. A collateral mistake is one that "does not go to the heart" of the contract. For a mutual mistake to render a contract void, then the item the parties are mistaken about must be material (emphasis added). When there is a material mistake about a material aspect of the contract, the essential purpose of the contract, there is the question of the assumption of the risk. This risk may be determined contractually or according to custom. In American law, the Restatement (Second) of Contracts Sec. 154 deals with this scenario.

This is easily confused with mutual assent cases such as Raffles v Wichelhaus. In Raffles, there was an agreement to ship goods on a vessel named Peerless, but each party was referring to a different vessel. Therefore, each party had a different understanding that they did not communicate about when the goods would be shipped.

In this case, both parties believed there was a "meeting of the minds", but discovered that they were each mistaken about the other party's different meaning. This represents not a mutual mistake but a failure of mutual assent. In this situation, no contract has been formed, since mutual assent is required in the formation stage of contract. In American law, the Restatement (Second) Contracts Sec. 20 deals with this scenario.

== Common mistake ==
A common mistake is where both parties hold the same mistaken belief of the facts.

The House of Lords case of Bell v Lever Brothers Ltd. established that common mistake can void a contract only if the mistake of the subject matter was sufficiently fundamental to render its identity different from what was contracted, making the performance of the contract impossible.

Later in Solle v Butcher, Lord Denning added requirements for common mistake in equity, which loosened the requirements to show common mistake. However, since that time, the case has been heavily criticized in cases such as Great Peace Shipping Ltd v Tsavliris (International) Ltd. For Australian application of Great Peace Shipping (other than in Queensland), see Svanosio v McNamara. For Queensland, see Australian Estates v Cairns City Council.

Those categories of mistake in the United States exist as well, but it is often necessary to identify whether the error was a "decisional mistake", which is a mistake as a matter of law (faced with two known choices, making the wrong one), or an "ignorant mistake", unaware of the true state of affairs.

The difference is in the extent to which an innocent in the information chain, passing along or using or processing incorrect information, becomes liable. There is a principle that an entity or person cannot be made more liable merely by being in the information chain and passing along information taken in good faith in the belief that it was true, or at least without knowledge of the likelihood of falsity or inaccuracy.

=== Roswell State Bank v. Lawrence Walker Cotton Co. ===
Under New Mexico law a bank, title company, document processing firm, or the like is not liable for false information provided to it, any more than a bank was liable for false information from a trusted customer turned embezzler who drew an unauthorized cashier's check:

A thing is done "in good faith" within the meaning of this act, when it is in fact done honestly, whether it be done negligently or not.

...

... [A] transferee is not bound to inquire whether the fiduciary is committing a breach of his obligation as fiduciary in transferring the instrument, and is not chargeable with notice that the fiduciary is committing a breach of his obligation as fiduciary unless he takes the instrument with actual knowledge of such breach or with knowledge of such facts that his action in taking the instrument amounts to bad faith.

56 N.M. at 112–113 (quoting from the Uniform Fiduciaries Act).

=== Davis v. Pennsylvania Co. 337 Pa. 456 ===
Roswell was the case of first impression on this issue in the state of New Mexico, and drew on cases in other jurisdictions interpreting the same language, most notably Davis v. Pennsylvania Co. 337 Pa. 456, which on similar facts to Roswell came to the same conclusion and exonerated the innocent actor in favor of shifting any responsibility for the loss to tortfeasors and those who enabled them to act by giving them unjustified authority.

The Davis case leads into another good analysis, in a case relied upon by Davis:

At what point does negligence cease and bad faith begin? The distinction between them is that bad faith, or dishonesty, is, unlike negligence, wilful. The mere failure to make inquiry, even though there be suspicious circumstances, does not constitute bad faith, unless said failure is due to the deliberate desire to evade knowledge because of a belief or fear that inquiry would disclose a vice or defect in the transaction, – that is to say, where there is an intentional closing of the eyes or stopping of the ears.

=== French Bank of California v. First National Bank of Louisville ===
In Kentucky, it was held in French Bank of California v. First National Bank of Louisville that money received by mistake does not have to be returned if there is an irrevocable change in position. It held that mistakes do not need to be rectified except by court order or indemnities being issued.

=== Union Bank & Trust Co. v. Girard Trust Co. ===
In Union Bank & Trust Co.v. Girard Trust Co., a firm processing information in order to transfer title using the information provided by customers lacked the intent to commit illegal or improper acts when the information furnished to it was wrong. It was not part of its job description to know better, and it did not know better and charged only a nominal fee for the clerical work, clearly not including any investigation. Further, it could not be in a conspiracy with another party or several parties who knew the information was wrong but failed to inform the title firm. The title firm could not unknowingly become part of a conspiracy of which it was never informed, and from which it could derive no benefit. The attempt to enhance liability or shift blame by filtering data through an innocent party has been tried before, but where the conduit providing document preparation does not know more than its informants and was not hired or paid to investigate, it is not liable in their place for using their bad facts without guilty knowledge.

=== Hynix Semiconductor America, Inc. v. United States ===
The U.S. Court of International Trade has gathered the law governing record-keeping mistakes and how they are corrected in Hynix Semiconductor America, Inc. v. United States, in which the Court was faced with the application of a tariff that had been calculated at the wrong rate by a customs clerk. To enforce "anti-dumping" legislation against foreign-made goods, a regulatory scheme was implemented under which such imports were charged a "liquidation duty" at a rate to be found on a schedule. The schedule had been made up by a panel of experts using standards for adjusting the price differential in overseas goods. The custom clerk used the wrong category of goods and overcharged the duty, and by the time Hynix figured out what had happened, part of a very short statute of limitations on protest had expired. Hynix nevertheless prevailed and received the correction in its tariff rate by showing that such an error "was correctable under 19 U.S.C. § 1520(c) as a mistake of fact or clerical error not amounting to an error in the construction of a law and because the failure to file a protest within ninety days of the liquidation of the entries is without legal consequence in this context".

The Hynix court explains the difference between a mistake of law "where the facts are known, but the legal consequences are not, or are believed to be different than they really are" (Century Importers, Inc. v. United States, 205 F.3d 1308, 1313 (Fed. Cir. 2000)), and a mistake of fact, "where either (1) the facts exist, but are unknown, or (2) the facts do not exist as they are believed to [exist]" (Hynix, 414 F. Supp. 2d. at 1325, quoting Hambro Auto. Corp. v. United States, 66 C.C.P.A. 113, 118, C.A.D. 1231, 603 F.2d 850, 853 (1979): "A mistake of fact is any mistake except a mistake of law.").

Hynix, in reviewing the tariff application to the facts, also provided a guided tour of the different kinds of mistake and how they are treated in the federal court system. The key distinction is between "decisional mistakes" and "ignorant mistakes".

‘Decisional mistakes are mistakes of law and occur when "a party [makes] the wrong choice between two known, alternative sets of facts". Universal Cooperatives, (citation partly omitted), 715 F. Supp. at 1114. On the other hand, an ignorant mistake occurs where "a party is unaware of the existence of the correct alternative set of facts". Id. "In order for the goods to be reliquidated under 1520 (c) (1), the alleged mistake of fact must be an ignorant mistake." Prosegur (citation partly omitted), 140 F. Supp. 2d at 1378. Hynix at 1326.

Hynix provided one more criterion, and that is "materiality", citing to extensive development of that requirement in Degussa Canada Ltd. v. United States, 87 F.3d 1301, 1304 (Fed. Cir. 1996), and Xerox Corp. v. United States, 2004 C.I.T. (Sept. 8, 2004) ("[A] mistake of fact ... is a factual error that, if the correct fact had been known, would have resulted in a different classification.") The error must be "material" in order to be corrected without consequence.

== See also ==
- Mistake in English contract law
- Vitiating factors in the law of contract
