= List of judgments of the Supreme Court of the United Kingdom delivered in 2015 =

This is a list of the judgments given by the Supreme Court of the United Kingdom in the year 2015 as of 8 August. So far 57 cases have been decided and these are ordered by neutral citation.

In 2015, Lord Neuberger of Abbotsbury was the President of the Supreme Court; Lady Hale of Richmond was the Deputy President.

The table lists judgments made by the court and the opinions of the judges in each case. Judges are treated as having concurred in another's judgment when they either formally attach themselves to the judgment of another or speak only to acknowledge their concurrence with one or more judges. Any judgment which reaches a conclusion which differs from the majority on one or more major points of the appeal has been treated as dissent.

All dates are for 2015 unless expressly stated otherwise.

== 2015 case summaries ==
Unless otherwise noted, cases were heard by a panel of 5 judges.

Cases involving Scots law are highlighted in orange. Cases involving Northern Irish law are highlighted in green.

Case name	Citation	Date	Legal subject	Summary of decision
McGraddie v McGraddie (Costs)	[2015] UKSC 1	28 January 2015	After-the-event insurance	
Michael v The Chief Constable of South Wales Police	[2015] UKSC 2	28 January 2015	Negligence; Article 2, ECHR	
Recovery of Medical Costs for Asbestos Diseases (Wales) Bill – Reference by the Counsel General for Wales	[2015] UKSC 3	9 February 2015	Welsh devolution	
Sustainable Shetland v The Scottish Ministers	[2015] UKSC 4	9 February 2015	Planning law	
Jackson v Murray	[2015] UKSC 5	18 February 2015	Contributory negligence	
R (Rotherham Metropolitan Borough Council) v Secretary of State for Business, Innovation and Skills	[2015] UKSC 6	25 February 2015	Judicial review; European Structural Funds	
R (Newhaven Port & Properties Ltd) v East Sussex County Council	[2015] UKSC 7	25 February 2015	Village green	
R (Jamar Brown (Jamaica)) v The Secretary of State for the Home Department	[2015] UKSC 8	4 March 2015	Immigration law	
R (Catt) v Commissioner of Police of the Metropolis	[2015] UKSC 9	4 March 2015	Data Protection Act 1998; Article 8, ECHR	
Sea Shepherd UK v Fish & Fish Ltd	[2015] UKSC 10	4 March 2015	Tort	
Montgomery v Lanarkshire Health Board	[2015] UKSC 11	11 March 2015	Medical law	
Tael One Partners Ltd v Morgan Stanley & Co International PLC	[2015] UKSC 12	11 March 2015	Contractual conditions	
Carlyle v Royal Bank of Scotland PLC	[2015] UKSC 13	11 March 2015	Scottish contract law	
Wyatt v Vince	[2015] UKSC 14	11 March 2015	Divorce law	
Akerman-Livingstone v Aster Communities Ltd (formerly Flourish Homes Ltd)	[2015] UKSC 15	11 March 2015	Equality Act 2010; Article 8, ECHR	
R (SG) v Secretary of State for Work and Pensions	[2015] UKSC 16	18 March 2015	Welfare Reform Act 2012; Article 14, ECHR	
Braganza v BP Shipping Ltd	[2015] UKSC 17	18 March 2015	Fatal Accidents Act 1976	
R (Trail Riders Fellowship) v Dorset County Council	[2015] UKSC 18	18 March 2015	Public rights of way	
Pham v Secretary of State for the Home Department	[2015] UKSC 19	25 March 2015	Immigration law	
Re S (A Child)	[2015] UKSC 20	25 March 2015	Costs	
R (Evans) v Attorney General	[2015] UKSC 21	26 March 2015	Freedom of Information Act 2000	
Nzolameso v City of Westminster	[2015] UKSC 22	2 April 2015	Homelessness	
Jetivia SA v Bilta (UK) Ltd	[2015] UKSC 23	22 April 2015	Insolvency law	
R v GH	[2015] UKSC 24	22 April 2015	Proceeds of Crime Act 2002	
R (Hemming) v Westminster City Council	[2015] UKSC 25	29 April 2015	Licensed sex shop	
University and College Union v The University of Stirling	[2015] UKSC 26	29 April 2015	Redundancy law	
Trustees of the Olympic Airlines SA Pension and Life Assurance Scheme v Olympic Airlines SA	[2015] UKSC 27	29 April 2015	Pension Protection Fund	
R (ClientEarth) v Secretary of State for the Environment, Food and Rural Affairs	[2015] UKSC 28	29 April 2015	Environmental law	
Gaughran v Chief Constable of the Police Service of Northern Ireland	[2015] UKSC 29	13 May 2015	DNA database; Article 8, ECHR	
Hotak v London Borough of Southwark	[2015] UKSC 30	13 May 2015	Homelessness	
Starbucks (HK) Ltd v British Sky Broadcasting Group plc	[2015] UKSC 31	13 May 2015	Passing off	
Rhodes v OPO	[2015] UKSC 32	20 May 2015	Freedom of expression	
Zurich Insurance PLC UK Branch v International Energy Group Ltd	[2015] UKSC 33	20 May 2015	Mesothelioma	
Haile v London Borough of Waltham Forest	[2015] UKSC 34	20 May 2015	Homelessness	
AR v RN	[2015] UKSC 35	22 May 2015	Hague Convention on the Civil Aspects of International Child Abduction	
Arnold v Britton	[2015] UKSC 36	10 June 2015	Contract law	
Commissioners for Her Majesty's Revenue and Customs v Pendragon plc	[2015] UKSC 37	10 June 2015	VAT	
Aspect Contracts (Asbestos) Ltd v Higgins Construction Plc	[2015] UKSC 38	17 June 2015	Contract law	
BPE Solicitors v Gabriel	[2015] UKSC 39	17 June 2015	Costs	
TN and MA (Afghanistan) v Secretary of State for the Home Department	[2015] UKSC 40	24 June 2015	Immigration law	
R (Lumsdon) v Legal Services Board	[2015] UKSC 41	24 June 2015	Judicial review	
In re JR38	[2015] UKSC 42	1 July 2015	Article 8, ECHR	
Bunge SA v Nidera BV	[2015] UKSC 43	1 July 2015	Contract law	
Anson v Commissioners for Her Majesty's Revenue and Customs	[2015] UKSC 44	1 July 2015	Tax law	
Edenred (UK Group) Ltd v HM Treasury	[2015] UKSC 45	1 July 2015	Public procurement	
R (Cornwall Council) v Somerset County Council	[2015] UKSC 46	8 July 2015	National Assistance Act 1948	
Mathieson v Secretary of State for Work and Pensions	[2015] UKSC 47	8 July 2015	Disability Living Allowance, EU law	
Commissioners for Her Majesty's Revenue and Customs v The Rank Group PLC	[2015] UKSC 48	8 July 2015	VAT	
Beghal v DPP	[2015] UKSC 49	22 July 2015	Terrorism Act 2000	
Coventry v Lawrence (No. 3)	[2015] UKSC 50	22 July 2015	Costs; Article 6, ECHR	
Hunt v North Somerset Council	[2015] UKSC 51	22 July 2015	Judicial review	
R (Champion) v North Norfolk District Council	[2015] UKSC 52	22 July 2015	Planning law; Habitats Directive	
Woolway v Mazars	[2015] UKSC 53	29 July 2015	Hereditament	
R (Bourgass) v Secretary of State for Justice	[2015] UKSC 54	29 July 2015	Prison	
Secretary of State for Work and Pensions v Tolley	[2015] UKSC 55	29 July 2015	Disability Living Allowance	
John Mander Pension Scheme Trustees Ltd v Commissioners for Her Majesty's Revenue and Customs	[2015] UKSC 56	29 July 2015	Pension schemes	
R (Tigere) v Secretary of State for Business, Innovation and Skills	[2015] UKSC 57	29 July 2015	Student loans	
Shahid v Scottish Ministers	[2015] UKSC 58	14 October 2015	Article 3, ECHR; Article 8, ECHR	
Mandalia v Secretary of State for the Home Department	[2015] UKSC 59	14 October 2015	Immigration law	
Sharland v Sharland	[2015] UKSC 60	14 October 2015	Divorce law	
Gohil v Gohil	[2015] UKSC 61	14 October 2015	Divorce law	
R v McGeough	[2015] UKSC 62	21 October 2015	Evidence	
The United States of America v Nolan	[2015] UKSC 63	21 October 2015	Trade Union and Labour Relations (Consolidation) Act 1992	
JSC BTA Bank v Ablyazov	[2015] UKSC 64	21 October 2015	Asset freezing	
British American Tobacco Denmark A/S v Kazemier Transport BV	[2015] UKSC 65	28 October 2015	Jurisdiction	
Bank of Cyprus UK Ltd. v Menelaou	[2015] UKSC 66	4 November 2015	Unjust enrichment	
Cavendish Square Holding BV v Talal El Makdessi	[2015] UKSC 67	4 November 2015	Contract law	
R (on the application of Ali) v Secretary of State for the Home Department	[2015] UKSC 68	18 November 2015	Immigration law	
Keyu v Secretary of State for Foreign and Commonwealth Affairs	[2015] UKSC 69	25 November 2015	Judicial review	
In the matter of J (a child)	[2015] UKSC 70	25 November 2015	Hague Convention on Parental Responsibility and Protection of Children; Jurisdiction	
Eclairs Group Ltd v JKX Oil & Gas plc	[2015] UKSC 71	2 December 2015	Companies Act 2006	
Marks and Spencer plc v BNP Paribas Securities Services Trust Company (Jersey) Ltd	[2015] UKSC 72	2 December 2015	Contract law	
R v Harvey	[2015] UKSC 73	16 December 2015	Proceeds of Crime Act 2002	
Trump International Golf Club Scotland Ltd v The Scottish Ministers	[2015] UKSC 74	16 December 2015	Planning law	
Société Cooperative De Production Seafrance SA v The Competition and Markets Authority	[2015] UKSC 75	16 December 2015	Mergers and acquisitions	
R (on the application of Wang Yam) v Central Criminal Court	[2015] UKSC 76	16 December 2015	Evidence	
Macklin v HM Advocate	[2015] UKSC 77	16 December 2015	Scottish criminal law	
Thevarajah v Riordan	[2015] UKSC 78	16 December 2015	Debarment	
R (on the application of Roberts) v Commissioner of Police of the Metropolis	[2015] UKSC 79	17 December 2015	Stop and search	

== 2015 opinions ==
Delivered a judgment (majority)	Concurred in the judgment of another justice (majority)	Delivered a judgment (dissenting)	Concurred in the judgment of another justice (dissent)	Did not participate in the decision

Case name	Citation	Argued	Decided	Neuberger of Abbotsbury	Hale of Richmond	Mance	Kerr of Tonaghmore	Clarke of Stone-cum-Ebony	Wilson of Culworth	Sumption	Reed	Carnwath of Notting Hill	Hughes of Ombersley	Toulson	Hodge
McGraddie v McGraddie (Costs)	[2015] UKSC 1	10 July 2013	28 January
Michael v The Chief Constable of South Wales Police	[2015] UKSC 2	28–29 July 2014	28 January
Recovery of Medical Costs for Asbestos Diseases (Wales) Bill: Reference by the Counsel General for Wales	[2015] UKSC 3	14–15 May 2014	9 February
Sustainable Shetland v The Scottish Ministers	[2015] UKSC 4	18 December 2014	9 February
Jackson v Murray	[2015] UKSC 5	20 October 2014	18 February
R (Rotherham Metropolitan Borough Council) v Secretary of State for Business, Innovation and Skills	[2015] UKSC 6	22–23 October 2014	25 February
R (Newhaven Port and Properties Ltd) v East Sussex County Council	[2015] UKSC 7	3–4 November 2014	25 February
R (Jamar Brown (Jamaica)) v The Secretary of State for the Home Department	[2015] UKSC 8	26 November 2014	4 March
R (Catt) v Commissioner of Police of the Metropolis	[2015] UKSC 9	2–4 December 2014	4 March
Sea Shepherd UK v Fish & Fish Ltd	[2015] UKSC 10	8 December 2014	4 March
Montgomery v Lanarkshire Health Board	[2015] UKSC 11	22–23 July 2014	11 March
Tael One Partners Ltd v Morgan Stanley & Co International PLC	[2015] UKSC 12	17 November 2014	11 March
Carlyle v Royal Bank of Scotland Plc	[2015] UKSC 13	20 November 2014	11 March
Wyatt v Vince	[2015] UKSC 14	8–9 December 2014	11 March
Akerman-Livingstone v Aster Communities Ltd (formerly Flourish Homes Limited)	[2015] UKSC 15	10 December 2014	11 March
R (SG) v Secretary of State for Work and Pensions	[2015] UKSC 16	29–30 April 2014	18 March
Braganza v BP Shipping Ltd	[2015] UKSC 17	10 November 2014	18 March
R (Trail Riders Fellowship) v Dorset County Council	[2015] UKSC 18	15 January	18 March
Pham v Secretary of State for the Home Department	[2015] UKSC 19	18–19 November 2014	25 March
Re S (A Child)	[2015] UKSC 20	28 January	25 March
R (Evans) v Attorney General	[2015] UKSC 21	24–25 November 2014	26 March
Nzolameso v City of Westminster	[2015] UKSC 22	17 March	2 April
Jetivita SA v Bilta (UK) Ltd	[2015] UKSC 23	14–15 October 2014	22 April
R v GH	[2015] UKSC 24	24 February	2 April
R (Hemming) v Westminster City Council	[2015] UKSC 25	13 January	29 April
University and College Union v The University of Sterling	[2015] UKSC 26	21 January	29 April
Trustees of the Olympic Airlines SA Pension and Life Assurance Scheme v Olympic Airlines SA	[2015] UKSC 27	2–3 February	29 April
R (ClientEarth) v Secretary of State for the Environment, Food and Rural Affairs	[2015] UKSC 28	16 April	29 April
Gaughran v Chief Constable of the Police Service of Northern Ireland	[2015] UKSC 29	16 October 2014	13 May
Hotak v London Borough of Southwark	[2015] UKSC 30	15, 16, 17 December 2014	13 May
Starbucks (HK) Ltd v British Sky Broadcasting Group plc	[2015] UKSC 31	25, 26 March	13 May
Rhodes v OPO	[2015] UKSC 32	19, 20 January	20 May
Zurich Insurance PLC UK Branch v International Energy Group Ltd	[2015] UKSC 33	15–16 July 2014; 27–28 July	20 May
Haile v London Borough of Waltham Forest	[2015] UKSC 34	29 January	20 May
AR v RN	[2015] UKSC 35	13 May	22 May
Arnold v Britton	[2015] UKSC 36	26 January	10 June
Commissioners for Her Majesty's Revenue and Customs v Pendragon plc	[2015] UKSC 37	11, 12 March	10 June
Aspect Contracts (Asbestos) Ltd v Higgins Construction Plc	[2015] UKSC 38	14, 15 April	17 June
BPE Solicitors v Gabriel	[2015] UKSC 39	20 April	17 June
TN and MA (Afghanistan) v Secretary of State for the Home Department	[2015] UKSC 40	2–3 March	24 June
R (Lumsdon) v Legal Services Board	[2015] UKSC 41	16 March	24 June
Re an application by JR38 for Judicial Review	[2015] UKSC 42	6 November 2014	1 July
Bunge SA v Nidera BV	[2015] UKSC 43	27–28 April	1 July
Anson v Commissioners for Her Majesty's Revenue and Customs	[2015] UKSC 44	27–28 October 2014 & 30 April	1 July
Edenred (UK Group) Ltd v HM Treasury	[2015] UKSC 45	13–14 May	1 July
R (Cornwall Council) v Secretary of State for Health	[2015] UKSC 46	18–19 March	8 July
Mathieson v Secretary of State for Work and Pensions	[2015] UKSC 47	26 March	8 July
Commissioners for Her Majesty's Revenue and Customs v The Rank Group PLC	[2015] UKSC 48	21 April	8 July
Beghal v DPP	[2015] UKSC 49	12–13 November 2014	22 July
Coventry v Lawrence (No. 3)	[2015] UKSC 50	9–10 & 12 February	22 July
Hunt v North Somerset Council	[2015] UKSC 51	29 April	22 July
R (Champion) v North Norfolk District Council	[2015] UKSC 52	23 June	22 July
Woolway v Mazars	[2015] UKSC 53	11 February	29 July
R (Bourgass) v Secretary of State for Justice	[2015] UKSC 54	16–17 February	29 July
Secretary of State for Work and Pensions v Tolley	[2015] UKSC 55	5–6 May	29 July
John Mander Pension Scheme Trustees Ltd v Commissioners for Her Majesty's Revenue and Customs	[2015] UKSC 56	16 June	29 July
R (Tigere) v Secretary of State for Business, Innovation and Skills	[2015] UKSC 57	24–25 June	29 July
Shahid v Scottish Ministers	[2015] UKSC 58	18 February	14 October
Mandalia v Secretary of State for the Home Department	[2015] UKSC 59	7 May	14 October
Sharland v Sharland	[2015] UKSC 60	8–10 June	14 October
Gohil v Gohil	[2015] UKSC 61	8–10 June	14 October
R v McGeough	[2015] UKSC 62	9 July	21 October
The United States of America v Nolan	[2015] UKSC 63	15–16 July	21 October
JSC BTA Bank v Ablyazov	[2015] UKSC 64	28 July	21 October
British American Tobacco Denmark A/S v Kazemier Transport BV	[2015] UKSC 65	29 June	28 October
Bank of Cyprus UK Ltd. v Menelaou	[2015] UKSC 66	17–18 June	4 November
Cavendish Square Holding BV v Talal El Makdessi	[2015] UKSC 67	21–23 July	4 November
R (on the application of Ali) v Secretary of State for the Home Department	[2015] UKSC 68	25–26 February	18 November
Keyu v Secretary of State for Foreign and Commonwealth Affairs	[2015] UKSC 69	22–23 April	25 November
In the matter of J (a child)	[2015] UKSC 70	17 November	25 November
Eclairs Group Ltd v JKX Oil & Gas plc	[2015] UKSC 71	18–19 May	2 December
Marks and Spencer plc v BNP Paribas Securities Services Trust Co. Ltd	[2015] UKSC 72	7 October	2 December
R v Harvey	[2015] UKSC 73	24 March	16 December
Trump International Golf Club Scotland Ltd v The Scottish Ministers	[2015] UKSC 74	8 October	16 December
Société Cooperative De Production Seafrance SA v The Competition and Markets Authority	[2015] UKSC 75	14–15 October	16 December
R (on the application of Wang Yam) v Central Criminal Court	[2015] UKSC 76	2 November	16 December
Macklin v HM Advocate	[2015] UKSC 77	4 November	16 December
Thevarajah v Riordan	[2015] UKSC 78	17 November	16 December
R (on the application of Roberts) v Commissioner of Police of the Metropolis	[2015] UKSC 79	20–21 October	17 December
