= Arnold v Britton =

UK Supreme Court case from 2015 on implied terms

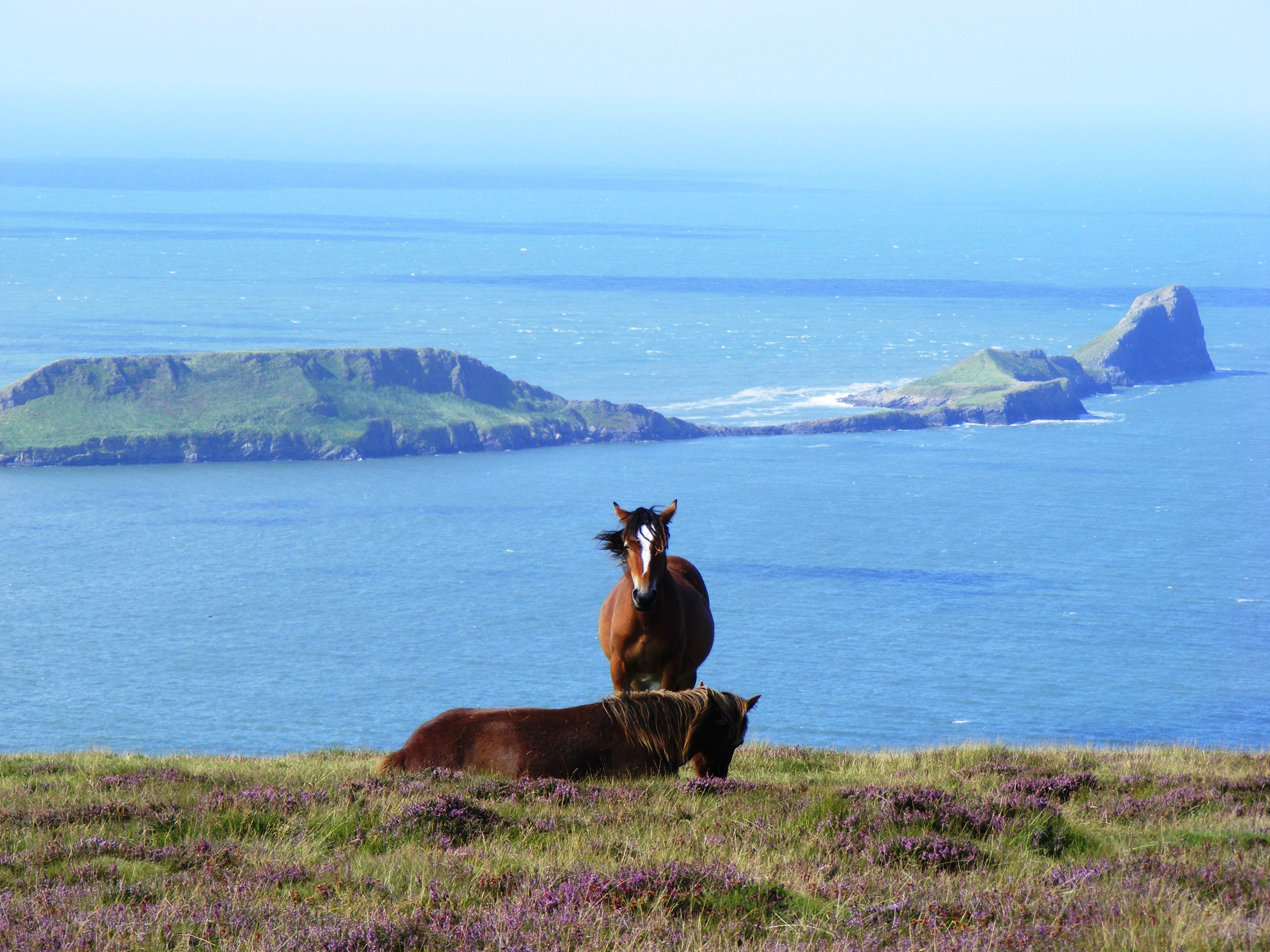
- Bay near Oxwich, Gower
- Court: UK Supreme Court
- Citations: [2015] UKSC 36, [2015] WLR(D) 247, [2015] AC 1619, [2016] 1 All ER 1, [2015] 2 WLR 1593, [2015] HLR 31
- Transcript: [2015] UKSC 36

Case history
- Prior action: On appeal from: [2013] EWCA Civ 902

Court membership
- Judges sitting: Lord Neuberger, (President) Lord Sumption, Lord Carnwath, Lord Hughes, Lord Hodge

Keywords
- Implied terms, absurdity, wretchedly conceived clauses

Arnold v Britton [2015] UKSC 36 is an English contract law case concerned with implied terms. The case was the subject of an Appeal Court ruling in 2013 and a Supreme Court decision in 2015. In the latter, the Supreme Court warned judges handling commercial disputes against excessive reliance on business common sense and commercial context when interpreting a contract, if this was not in line with the actual language used in a contract.

== Facts ==
Paddy Arnold, landlord of Oxwich Leisure Park, near Swansea, claimed Britton, the tenant with 42 others, should pay service repairs at 10% increases every year, as their contract expressly stated. Britton and others had leases for holiday chalets for 99 years from 1974. The total number of properties concerned being 25 (The lessee may be one or more persons).

5. Twenty-five of the chalets are said by the respondent, the current owner of the Leisure Park and the landlord under the leases, to be subject to leases containing a service charge provision in clause 3(2), which requires the lessee to pay for the first year of the term a fixed sum of £90 per annum, and for each ensuing year a fixed sum representing a 10% increase on the previous year – ie an initial annual service charge of £90, which increases at a compound rate of 10% in each succeeding year. The issue on this appeal is whether the respondent’s interpretation of clause 3(2) in those 25 leases is correct.

== Evidence ==
8. To complicate matters a little further, the service charge clause in four of these 21 leases (being three of the seven which did not include the words in bold in the preceding quotation), had the word “for” before “the yearly sum of Ninety Pounds”. These four leases also included a proviso to the effect that, so long as “the term hereby created is vested in the [original lessees] or the survivor of them”, clause 3(2) would be treated as being in the form set out in para 6 above. This proviso has ceased to have effect as these four leases are no longer vested in the original lessees.

9. Finally, the service charge clause in four of the 70 leases referred to in para 6 above were varied pursuant to deeds of variation executed between October 1998 and August 2002 so as to be identical to that set out in para 7 above, including the words in bold. [...]

The evidence

11. Apart from the documents themselves and the published Retail Price Index (RPI) for each of the years 1970-2010, there is no evidence as to the surrounding circumstances in which the 21 leases were executed, other than the fact that the four leases referred to in para 8 above were granted to individuals connected with the lessor. Following a request from the court, we were also told that three of the four deeds of variation referred to in para 9 above were entered into with the lessor's daughter as lessee.

Each lease said it was granted ‘upon terms similar in all respects’ to other leases, and clause 3 said tenants should repair the chalets, for each other's benefit. Clause 4(8) put a covenant on the lessors that covenants were the same. For a first group of leases, clause 3(2) said a lessee should pay ‘a proportionate part of the expenses’ for repairs and services, at £90 a year, increasing at a three-year compound rate of 10%. But in a second group, it said the repair rate should be increased by 10% every year. Those tenants claimed in 2011 that, with the annual service charge over £2,700 (compared to the first group that was still paying £282 a year), (Note: Their escalating service charges would mean they would be liable for over £1 million a year by 2074.) their clause 3(2) should be reinterpreted as requiring a variable sum in fair proportion to the cost of the services, and a specified sum no more than a capped maximum. Arnold brought proceedings under CPR Part 8 to declare clause 3(2) required what it said.

The County Court judge accepted the tenants’ claim.

The High Court held that on a natural reading, it was what it said and he could not rewrite the bargain. Given the high levels of inflation when the deals were signed, it could not be said that the 10% annual rate lacked commercial purpose.

The Court of Appeal affirmed High Court that the tenants were bound to pay the charge.

== Judgment ==
The majority of the Supreme Court (Lord Neuberger, Lord Sumption, Lord Hughes, Lord Hodge) dismissed the appeal and affirmed that Britton and others were bound to pay the escalating repair costs. The less clear the words, the more the court could depart from natural meaning, but it was not to try and exploit bad drafting. The purpose of interpretation was to identify what the parties had agreed, not what the court thinks they should have agreed. The court's function was not to relieve parties of the consequences of imprudence or poor advice. In clause 3(2) the natural meaning was clear. So the landlord was entitled to the declaration that the contract was binding. Lord Neuberger said the following.

14. Over the past 45 years, the House of Lords and Supreme Court have discussed the correct approach to be adopted to the interpretation, or construction, of contracts in a number of cases starting with Prenn v Simmonds [1971] 1 WLR 1381 and culminating in Rainy Sky SA v Kookmin Bank [2011] UKSC 50; [2011] 1 WLR 2900.

15. When interpreting a written contract, the court is concerned to identify the intention of the parties by reference to "what a reasonable person having all the background knowledge which would have been available to the parties would have understood them to be using the language in the contract to mean", to quote Lord Hoffmann in Chartbrook Ltd v Persimmon Homes Ltd [2009] UKHL 38, [2009] 1 AC 1101, para 14. And it does so by focussing on the meaning of the relevant words, in this case clause 3(2) of each of the 25 leases, in their documentary, factual and commercial context. That meaning has to be assessed in the light of (i) the natural and ordinary meaning of the clause, (ii) any other relevant provisions of the lease, (iii) the overall purpose of the clause and the lease, (iv) the facts and circumstances known or assumed by the parties at the time that the document was executed, and (v) commercial common sense, but (vi) disregarding subjective evidence of any party's intentions. In this connection, see Prenn at pp 1384-1386 and Reardon Smith Line Ltd v Yngvar Hansen-Tangen (trading as HE Hansen-Tangen) [1976] 1 WLR 989, 995-997 per Lord Wilberforce, Bank of Credit and Commerce International SA (in liquidation) v Ali [2002] 1 AC 251, para 8, per Lord Bingham, and the survey of more recent authorities in Rainy Sky, per Lord Clarke at paras 21-30.

16. For present purposes, I think it is important to emphasise seven factors.

17. First, the reliance placed in some cases on commercial common sense and surrounding circumstances (eg in Chartbrook, paras 16-26) should not be invoked to undervalue the importance of the language of the provision which is to be construed. The exercise of interpreting a provision involves identifying what the parties meant through the eyes of a reasonable reader, and, save perhaps in a very unusual case, that meaning is most obviously to be gleaned from the language of the provision. Unlike commercial common sense and the surrounding circumstances, the parties have control over the language they use in a contract. And, again save perhaps in a very unusual case, the parties must have been specifically focussing on the issue covered by the provision when agreeing the wording of that provision.

18. Secondly, when it comes to considering the centrally relevant words to be interpreted, I accept that the less clear they are, or, to put it another way, the worse their drafting, the more ready the court can properly be to depart from their natural meaning. That is simply the obverse of the sensible proposition that the clearer the natural meaning the more difficult it is to justify departing from it. However, that does not justify the court embarking on an exercise of searching for, let alone constructing, drafting infelicities in order to facilitate a departure from the natural meaning. If there is a specific error in the drafting, it may often have no relevance to the issue of interpretation which the court has to resolve.

19. The third point I should mention is that commercial common sense is not to be invoked retrospectively. The mere fact that a contractual arrangement, if interpreted according to its natural language, has worked out badly, or even disastrously, for one of the parties is not a reason for departing from the natural language. Commercial common sense is only relevant to the extent of how matters would or could have been perceived by the parties, or by reasonable people in the position of the parties, as at the date that the contract was made. Judicial observations such as those of Lord Reid in Wickman Machine Tools Sales Ltd v L Schuler AG [1974] AC 235, 251 and Lord Diplock in Antaios Cia Naviera SA v Salen Rederierna AB (The Antaios) [1985] AC 191, 201, quoted by Lord Carnwath at para 110, have to be read and applied bearing that important point in mind.

20. Fourthly, while commercial common sense is a very important factor to take into account when interpreting a contract, a court should be very slow to reject the natural meaning of a provision as correct simply because it appears to be a very imprudent term for one of the parties to have agreed, even ignoring the benefit of wisdom of hindsight. The purpose of interpretation is to identify what the parties have agreed, not what the court thinks that they should have agreed. Experience shows that it is by no means unknown for people to enter into arrangements which are ill-advised, even ignoring the benefit of wisdom of hindsight, and it is not the function of a court when interpreting an agreement to relieve a party from the consequences of his imprudence or poor advice. Accordingly, when interpreting a contract a judge should avoid re-writing it in an attempt to assist an unwise party or to penalise an astute party.

21. The fifth point concerns the facts known to the parties. When interpreting a contractual provision, one can only take into account facts or circumstances which existed at the time that the contract was made, and which were known or reasonably available to both parties. Given that a contract is a bilateral, or synallagmatic, arrangement involving both parties, it cannot be right, when interpreting a contractual provision, to take into account a fact or circumstance known only to one of the parties.

22. Sixthly, in some cases, an event subsequently occurs which was plainly not intended or contemplated by the parties, judging from the language of their contract. In such a case, if it is clear what the parties would have intended, the court will give effect to that intention. An example of such a case is Aberdeen City Council v Stewart Milne Group Ltd [2011] UKSC 56, 2012 SCLR 114, where the court concluded that "any … approach" other than that which was adopted "would defeat the parties' clear objectives", but the conclusion was based on what the parties "had in mind when they entered into" the contract (see paras 17 and 22).

23. Seventhly, reference was made in argument to service charge clauses being construed "restrictively". I am unconvinced by the notion that service charge clauses are to be subject to any special rule of interpretation. Even if (which it is unnecessary to decide) a landlord may have simpler remedies than a tenant to enforce service charge provisions, that is not relevant to the issue of how one interprets the contractual machinery for assessing the tenant's contribution. The origin of the adverb was in a judgment of Rix LJ in McHale v Earl Cadogan [2010] EWCA Civ 14, [2010] 1 EGLR 51, para 17. What he was saying, quite correctly, was that the court should not "bring within the general words of a service charge clause anything which does not clearly belong there". However, that does not help resolve the sort of issue of interpretation raised in this case.

[...]

35. Quite apart from the fact that the effect of clause 3(2) appears clear in each lease as a matter of language, I am far from convinced by the commercially-based argument that it is inconceivable that a lessee would have agreed a service charge provision which had the effect for which the respondents contend, at least in the 1970s and much of the 1980s. Although I would have expected most solicitors to have advised against it, and imprudent though it undoubtedly has turned out to be (at least so far), a lessee could have taken the view that a fixed rate of increase of 10% per annum on a fixed initial service charge, at a time when annual inflation had been running at a higher rate for a number of years (well over 10% per annum between 1974 and 1981, indeed over 15% per annum for six of those eight years; although it was less than 10% per annum after 1981), was attractive or at least acceptable.

36. If inflation is running at, say 10% per annum, it is, of course, very risky for both the payer and the payee, under a contract which is to last around 90 years, to agree that a fixed annual sum would increase automatically by 10% a year. They are taking a gamble on inflation, but at least it is a bilateral gamble: if inflation is higher than 10% per annum, the lessee benefits; if it is lower, the lessor benefits. On the interpretation offered by the appellants, it is a one way gamble: the lessee cannot lose because, at worst, he will pay the cost of the services, but, if inflation runs at more than 10% per annum, the lessor loses out.

Lord Hodge gave a concurring judgment.

Lord Carnwath dissented.

90. By sections 18-19 of the Landlord and Tenant Act 1985, a "service charge" (as defined) payable by a tenant of a "dwelling", is limited to an amount which reflects the costs "reasonably incurred" in the provision of services. The controls originally applied only to "flats" but were extended by amendment in 1987 to include "dwellings" as defined (Landlord and Tenant Act 1987 section 60). It is not in dispute, in these proceedings at least, that the chalets are "dwellings" for this purpose. The issue is whether the charges are "service charges" as defined by section 18(1):

"'service charge' means an amount payable by the tenant of a dwelling as part of or in addition to the rent –

(a) which is payable, directly or indirectly, for services, repairs, maintenance, improvements or insurance or the landlord's costs of management, and
(b) the whole or part of which varies or may vary according to the relevant costs."

91. The lessees submit that properly interpreted the clause imposes an obligation to pay a "proportionate part" of the costs incurred, subject only to an upper limit or cap determined by reference to the formula in the second part of the clause. On this footing it is an amount which "varies or may vary according to the relevant costs" (section 18(1)(b)). The respondent submits that charge is outside the statutory definition because the annual amount is fixed by that formula, without any reference to the costs actually incurred by the lessor. If the lessees are right, the amount of the charge is limited to the amounts reasonably incurred. If the lessor is right, there is no statutory limit or other control.

92. Other safeguards for lessees were introduced by the 1987 Act, but none covers the present situation. Thus it introduced a new right for any party to a long lease (not only the lessee) of a "flat" to apply to the court (now the first-tier tribunal) for an order varying a lease on the grounds that it "fails to make satisfactory provision" in respect of various matters, one being the computation of service charges, but this did not apply to other forms of dwelling such as in this case. There is a more general provision, for application by "a majority of parties" for variation of a number of leases under a single lessor (section 75), but again it applies only to flats. On the other hand, section 40, which allows similar applications for variation of insurance provisions, applies to "dwellings" in general. It is difficult to detect any legislative purposes for these distinctions. The present case illustrates the potentially unfortunate consequences for parties to those rare forms of residential lease which for no apparent reason fall outside any of the protections given by the legislative scheme.

93. For completeness, I note also that no issue arises in the present proceedings as to the possible application of other more general protections relating to unfair contractual terms. Sections 2 to 4 of the Unfair Contract Terms Act 1977 do not in any event apply to contracts relating to the creation or transfer of interests in land (Schedule 1, paragraph 1(b)). No such limitation appears in the Unfair Terms in Consumer Contracts Regulations 1999 (SI 1999/2083), which give effect in this country to EC Directive 93/13/EEC of 5 April 1993 on unfair terms in consumer contracts. The Directive was first transposed in 1994 Regulations (SI 1994/3159) which were later replaced by the 1999 Regulations. The 1994 Regulations came into effect on 1 July 1995, and therefore would not it seems apply to contracts concluded before that date (regulation 1; Chitty on Contracts para 37-087). Accordingly, it could be relevant if at all only to version 5 (2000).

[...]

Approach to interpretation

108. In an unusual case such as this, little direct help is to be gained from authorities on other contracts in other contexts. As Tolstoy said of unhappy families, every ill-drafted contract is ill-drafted "in its own way". However, the authorities provide guidance as to the interpretative tools available for the task. The general principles are now authoritatively drawn together in an important passage in the judgment of Lord Clarke JSC in Rainy Sky SA v Kookmin Bank [2011] 1 WLR 2900, paras 14-30. As that passage shows, there is often a tension between, on the one hand, the principle that the parties' common intentions should be derived from the words they used, and on the other the need if possible to avoid a nonsensical result.

109. The former is evident, as Lord Clarke emphasised, in the rule that "where the parties have used unambiguous language, the court must apply it" (para 23). However, in view of the importance attached by others to the so-called "natural meaning" of clause 3(2), it is important to note that Lord Clarke (paras 20-23) specifically rejected Patten LJ's proposition that -

"… unless the most natural meaning of the words produces a result so extreme as to suggest that it was unintended, the court must give effect to that meaning."

In Lord Clarke's view it was only if the words used by the parties were "unambiguous" that the court had no choice in the matter.

110. He illustrated the other side of the coin by quotations from Lord Reid in Wickman Machine Tools Sales Ltd v L Schuler AG [1974] AC 235, 251:

"The fact that a particular construction leads to a very unreasonable result must be a relevant consideration. The more unreasonable the result, the more unlikely it is that the parties can have intended it, and if they do intend it the more necessary it is that they shall make that intention abundantly clear."

and Lord Diplock in Antaios Cia Naviera SA v Salen Rederierna AB (The Antaios) [1985] AC 191, 201:

"If detailed and syntactical analysis of words in a commercial contract is going to lead to a conclusion that flouts business common sense it must yield to business common sense."

As a rider to the last quotation, Lord Clarke cited the cautionary words of Hoffmann LJ (Co-operative Wholesale Society Ltd v National Westminster Bank plc [1995] 1 EGLR 97, 99):

"This robust declaration does not, however, mean that one can rewrite the language which the parties have used in order to make the contract conform to business common sense. But language is a very flexible instrument and, if it is capable of more than one construction, one chooses that which seems most likely to give effect to the commercial purpose of the agreement."

[...]

124. Against that general background, I come to consider the construction of clause 3(2) in its various versions. At first sight, the main principles seem reasonably clear:

i) The intention was that all the leases should be on terms as "similar … as the circumstances permit", and that it was the lessors' responsibility to achieve such equivalence (necessarily, since only they would be party to all of them) (preamble (2); clause 4(8))
ii) The commercial purpose of clause 3(2) was to enable the lessor to recover from the lessees the costs incurred by him in maintaining the estate on their behalf, the payment by each lessee being intended to represent a "proportionate" part of the expenses so incurred.
iii) Although there was a general description of the services which the lessor was contractually obliged to provide, the extent of those services was not precisely defined by the lessors' covenants (clause 4), which left to them a large measure of discretion as to the amounts to be spent in practice.

In themselves, these features are typical and uncontroversial. It is at the next stage, in giving effect to those principles, that the clause becomes problematic.

125. It is clear to my mind that something has gone wrong with the drafting, at least in the original wording, as it appeared in the 1974 version, and (apart from the change of inflation formula) was repeated in 1985 and 1988. The clause imposes an obligation to pay, but contains two different descriptions of the payable amount: by reference, first, to a "proportionate part of the expenses and outgoings incurred by the Lessor in the repair maintenance renewal and the provision of services …", and secondly, to a "yearly sum" determined by reference to a fixed formula. There are two linguistic problems. First, there is no grammatical connection to show the relationship between the two descriptions. Secondly, they are mutually inconsistent. A figure can be determined as a proportionate part of some other variable amount, or it can be a yearly sum, fixed by a predetermined formula; but it cannot be both. There is an inherent ambiguity which needs to be resolved.

[...]

The five versions in context

Version 1 (October 1974 - July 1980)

132. It is impossible to do more than guess at the common intentions of the parties to the first lease in relation to this part of clause 3(2). It is hard at first sight to see any rational basis for selecting a rate of 10% every three years, at a time when annual inflation was running at around twice that rate. At little over 3% per year, it was a little low even by reference to the inflation of the two previous decades, although it was in line with the historic long term average.

133. In such inflationary conditions, there is no difficulty in understanding why it was acceptable to the lessees. It is the lessor’s thinking which needs explaining. We know nothing of the first lessors (the Lewises). They may perhaps have been builders, themselves involved in the development of the estate, and so more able to absorb the initial costs of maintenance in their other expenditure. If so, to make the estate attractive to purchasers, they may have gambled on being able to bear the price increases during the early years, in the expectation of inflation falling to more reasonable levels in the near future. (Comparable optimism seems to have been reflected in their view of ground rent, which was to be increased by only 50% every 21 years.)

[...]

150. Since these variations were agreed only 15 years ago, and since by this time the respondent, Mrs Arnold, was herself directly involved, it might have been thought that she at least would be able to throw some light on these extraordinary transactions. After the hearing, the parties were put on notice of the court’s concern on this point, and invited to comment. It has emerged that three out of the four variations were agreed between Mrs Arnold and her daughter, Mrs Fraser (signed under a power of attorney by Mrs Arnold’s son). The fourth was a Mrs Pace, of whom no information has been provided, save that she is apparently still the owner of the chalet, and she is named as one of the defendants in these proceedings.

151. If there was in Mrs Arnold’s thinking a rational explanation for these particular variations, she has not taken the opportunity to disclose it. Instead of such direct evidence, Mr Daiches remarkably asks us to imagine a series of “inferences” drawn by the parties (including his client and her daughter) and the reasonable observer. They would have inferred, he says, that version 1 lessees were paying less than the rates required by inflation and that there were in consequence “historic shortfalls” in the lessor’s service charge income; and that the multiplier was to be increased, not only to take account of actual inflation since 1974, and to reflect the fact that it might once again rise to levels above that implied by the triennial formula, but also to compensate the lessor both for past shortfalls, and for the risk that he or she might not be able to persuade other lessees to agree to similar increases in the future.

152. With respect to Mr Daiches I have to say that, even in this extraordinary case, I find these submissions quite astonishing. Given that his client and her daughter were the principal parties to these transactions, why on earth should the court be expected to draw “inferences” as to what was in their minds? Why should we speculate as to the extent of any “historic shortfalls”, when she presumably has access to the actual accounts, and has resisted the lessees’ requests for disclosure?

What evidence is there that by 2000 anyone was seriously concerned about an imminent risk of return to double-digit inflation? Finally, what possible reason would these lessees have had for wishing to “compensate” the lessor for the past or future financial consequences of imperfections in leases for which they were not responsible?

153. With regard to the only independent party, Mrs Pace, Mr Daiches asks us to note that her variation was agreed shortly after the sale of the lease to her by the respondent herself. It should not be difficult, he says, to “infer that the purchase price paid by her to the respondent reflected her agreement to increase the multiplier”. Although she is apparently one of the appellants represented by Mr Morshead, he has not volunteered any specific explanation on her behalf. He merely points to the difficulty of imagining any price reduction or other inducement sufficient to compensate her for “the devastating implications” of the multiplier if it operates as Mrs Arnold contends.

154. In the absence of further evidence from either side, it is impossible to draw any clear conclusions about the purpose of these curious transactions. It is enough to observe that, viewed objectively, they are at least consistent with an interpretation which limits the lessees’ future exposure to actual inflation, within a defined limit. On the lessors’ interpretation, as with version 4, they make no sense at all.

Conclusion

155. The true explanation for these wretchedly conceived clauses may be lost in history, but the problems for the parties are all too present and deeply regrettable. No doubt in recognition of such considerations, Mr Daiches, on behalf of Mrs Arnold, indicated that his client "fully understands the appellants' predicament and is sympathetic to it", and that if the appeal fails there would have to be a re-negotiation of the leases "for pragmatic if not for legal reasons". She wished it to be stated openly that –

"… she is willing for the appellants' leases to be renegotiated on terms that would, among other things, involve the leases being varied by substituting an adjustment linked to the Consumer Price Inflation index instead of the current fixed adjustment of 10% per annum."

[...]

157. Whatever the strict legal position, the other lessees may perhaps be persuaded that they have a common interest in the good management of the estate, and at least a moral obligation to contribute their fair share of its costs. A long-running dispute of this kind can hardly be conducive to the atmosphere appropriate to a holiday location, even for those not directly involved. It is to be hoped that some way can be found of bringing them into the discussions. On any view, the case seems to cry out for expert mediation, if it has not been attempted before, preferably not confined to the present parties. If thought appropriate, one possibility might be an application by consent to the President of the First-Tier Tribunal (Property Chamber – Residential Property) to appoint as mediator a senior judge of that tribunal, with the benefit of that tribunal's experience of dealing with service charge issues under statute. However, that must be a matter for the parties not this court.

158. It is necessary therefore to return to the essential question: what in the view of a reasonable observer did clause 3(2) mean? It will be apparent from my detailed analysis that I regard the consequences of the lessor's interpretation as so commercially improbable that only the clearest words would justify the court in adopting it. I agree with HH Judge Jarman QC that the limited addition proposed by the lessees does not do such violence to the contractual language as to justify a result which is commercial nonsense.

== See also ==
- Rainy Sky SA v Kookmin Bank
- Chartbrook Ltd v Persimmon Homes Ltd
- Investors Compensation Scheme Ltd v West Bromwich Building Society
