= The United States of America v Nolan =

- Court: Supreme Court of the United Kingdom
- Full case name: The United States of America (Appellant) v Nolan (Respondent)
- Argued: 15 & 16 July 2015
- Decided: 21 October 2015
- Neutral citation: [2015] UKSC 63

Case history
- Prior history: [2014] EWCA Civ 71

Holding
- The Trade Union and Labour Relations (Consolidation) Act 1992 applies to employment in a public administrative establishment. The secretary of state did not exceed his powers when making the Collective Redundancies and Transfer of Undertakings (Protection of Employment) (Amendment) Regulations 1995 by going further than EU law requires.

Case opinions
- Majority: Lord Neuberger, Lady Hale, Lord Mance and Lord Reed
- Dissent: Lord Carnwath

Area of law
- Labour law; European Union law

The United States of America v Nolan [2015] UKSC 63 was a 2015 judgment of the Supreme Court of the United Kingdom concerning the application of the Trade Union and Labour Relations (Consolidation) Act 1992 to public administrative establishments.

== Facts ==
Mrs Nolan worked at a watercraft repair centre in Hythe, Hampshire operated by the United States Army. In 2006 the base was closed down and Mrs Nolan was dismissed for redundancy on the day before it closed. Mrs Nolan brought a case based on the failure of the United States to consult with an employee representative when proposing to dismiss her.

== Judgment ==
=== Employment Tribunals ===
Both the Employment Tribunal and Employment Appeal Tribunal found in favour of Mrs Nolan and granted an order for remuneration for a one-month period.

=== Court of Appeal ===
Under the preliminary ruling procedure the Court of Appeal asked the Court of Justice of the European Union whether the duty to consult with an employee representative arose on a 'proposal' or a 'decision' to close the base. The European Court declined jurisdiction over the issue.

=== Supreme Court ===
The United States appealed to the Supreme Court on two key grounds. Firstly that the Trade Union and Labour Relations (Consolidation) Act 1992 should not apply to public administrative establishments and secondly that the Secretary of State had exceeded the powers conferred by section 2 of the European Communities Act 1972 by going further than EU law required. These appeals were dismissed on the basis that just because legislation does not contain a clear exemption does not mean that the courts should read any such exemption into the legislation. On the second ground it was held that because the Trade Union and Labour Relations (Consolidation) Act 1992 had established a unified domestic regime the Secretary of State had not exceeded his powers when making the 1995 regulations.

Lord Carnwath dissented on this point and noted the importance of limiting the ministerial power to legislate outside of the normal parliamentary process.

== Significance ==
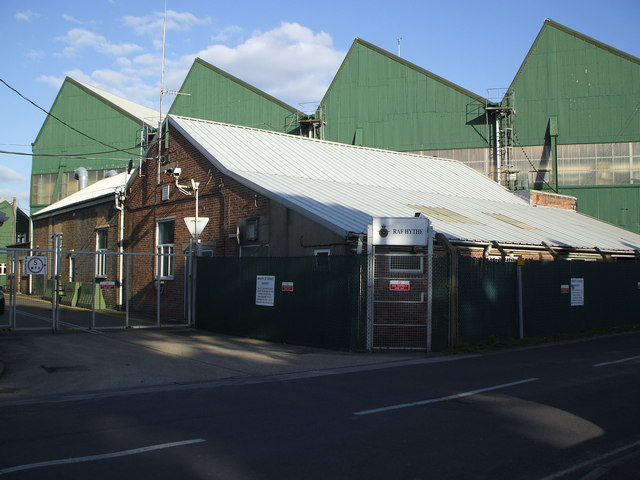
A building at the RAF Hythe base where Mrs Nolan worked

The case will now return to the Court of Appeal where it will be decided whether the duty to consult arises when there is a proposal to make a business decision that will lead to redundancies or when that decision has been made. On this point it has been argued that:

The former would extend information and consultation rights backwards into commercial decision-making, while the latter might be seen as pointlessly late – how can you consult meaningfully about reducing the number of redundancies where the decision which makes them inevitable has already been taken?

== See also ==
- United Kingdom labour law
- Redundancy in United Kingdom law
- 2015 Judgments of the Supreme Court of the United Kingdom
- European Union law
