= Trump International Golf Club Scotland Ltd v The Scottish Ministers =

UK legal case

Trump Golf Club Ltd v Scotland
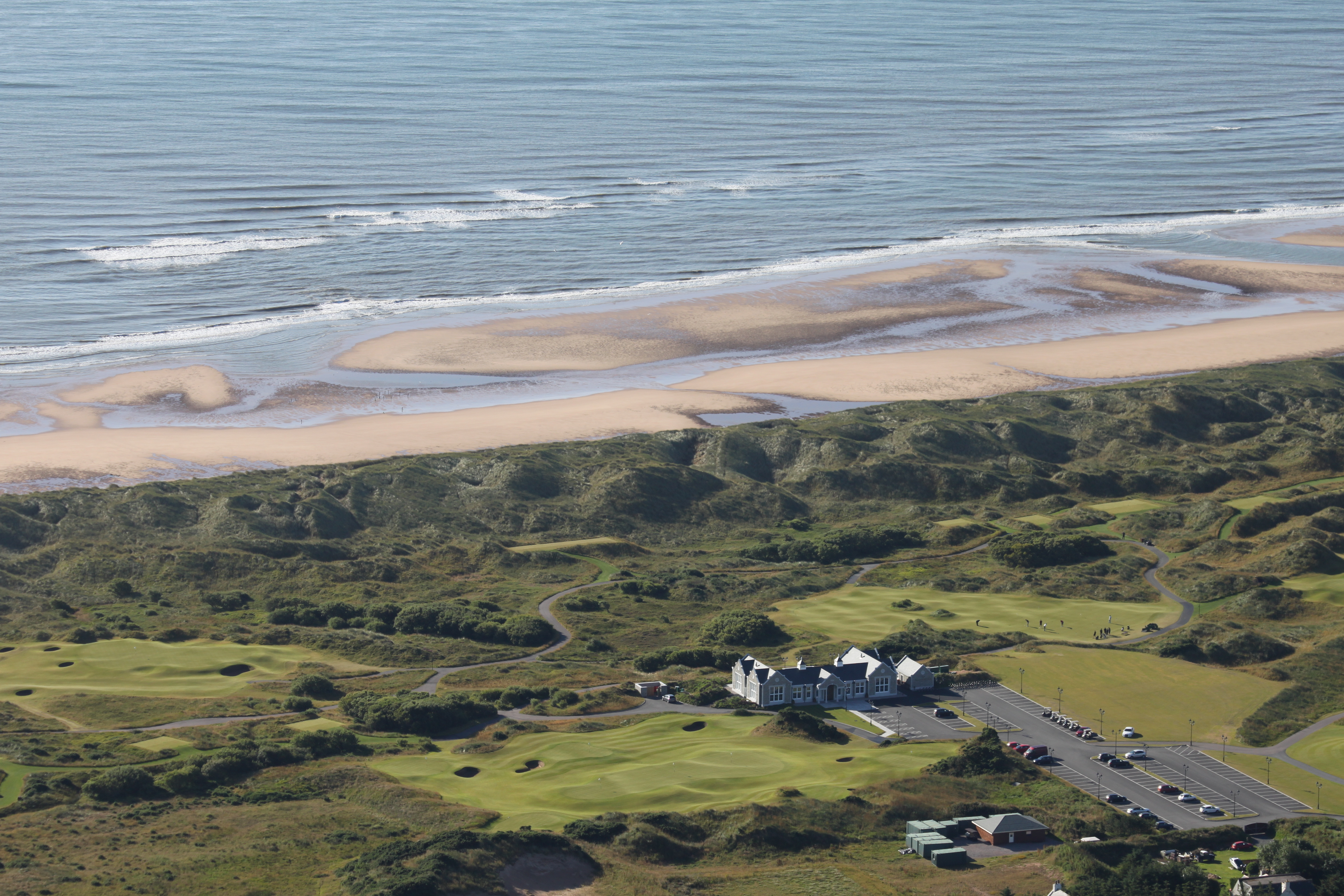
- Trump International Golf Links
- Court: Supreme Court of the United Kingdom
- Full case name: Trump International Golf Club Scotland Ltd v The Scottish Ministers (Scotland)
- Argued: 8 October 2015
- Decided: 16 December 2015
- Neutral citation: [2015] UKSC 74
- Transcript: Decision

Case history
- Prior history: [2015] CSIH 46

Holding
- Appeal dismissed. Section 36 of the Electricity Act 1989 does not allow Scottish Ministers to modify the way in which a wind farm is constructed and operated and does not enable alterations to the nature of an approved development by Scottish Ministers.

Court membership
- Judges sitting: Neuberger, Mance, Reed, Carnwath and Hodge

Case opinions
- Majority: Hodge, joined by unanimous

Area of law
- Scottish land use and planning policy Utilities - electricity generation

Trump International Golf Club Scotland Ltd v Scotland [2015] UKSC 74 is a 2015 judgment of the Supreme Court of the United Kingdom on the authority of the Scottish government to allow windfarm applications, under the Electricity Act 1989. It is relevant for UK enterprise law and the regulation of UK wind power.

== Facts ==
An offshore wind farm near the Energy Futures Centre was initially proposed by the Aberdeen Renewable Energy Group (AREG) in 2003. The original plan was for 20 two-megawatt turbines in an eight kilometres long row about 1 kilometre offshore.

American developer and future United States President Donald Trump purchased a large part of the Menie estate near the village of Balmedie in 2006. He proposed to build a golf course called Trump International Golf Links, Scotland, with a hotel, holiday homes and a residential village. He expressed his concerns about the wind farm in April 2006 stating that "I want to see the ocean, I do not want to see windmills."

In 2006 RSPB Scotland expressed concern about the effect the wind farm and Donald Trump's golf course would have on the wildlife on the Aberdeenshire coast. Scottish First Minister Alex Salmond helped Trump through local land disputes to enable the golf resort.

In 2011, Aberdeen Offshore Wind Farm Ltd applied to construct and operate the Aberdeen Bay Wind Farm (European Offshore Wind Deployment Centre) with 11 turbines, about 3.5 km from the resort. The proposed windfarm would be visible from the resort and several other golf courses, like Newburgh On Ythan, Murcar Links, Royal Aberdeen and others, some of which also have nearby turbines.

In September 2011 the Trump Organization filed an objection to the planning application.

Donald Trump also wrote to Salmond objecting to the turbines calling them "environmentally irresponsible". In a follow-up letter in the same month, he went on to describe the wind turbines as "ugly", and that he was "fighting for the benefit of Scotland."

In January 2012, Donald Trump halted work developing the golf resort pending a decision on the wind farm by Scottish ministers. In March 2012, Trump sent another letter to Alex Salmond warning the first minister that he would become "known for centuries" as "the man who destroyed Scotland". Appearing before the Scottish Parliament's economy, energy and tourism committee in April 2012, he claimed that he had been "lured" into building the golf resort upon assurances by the former and current first ministers, Jack McConnell and Alex Salmond, that the wind farm would not be built. Jack McConnell and Alex Salmond denied the claims. Trump stated that his golf course was due to open in July, but his plans for a hotel and hundreds of homes on the site had been put on hold. In September 2012, complaints were upheld by the Advertising Standards Authority about newspaper adverts commissioned by The Trump Organization which gave "a misleading impression of the possible consequences of the Scottish government's plans to use wind turbines." In October 2012, Trump attacked RSPB Scotland for dropping opposition to the wind farm claiming that "their name should be changed to RSKB - Royal Society for the Killing of Birds." Later that month, his lawyers called for a public inquiry into the wind farm. In December 2012, an advertisement sanctioned by The Trump Organization appeared in print which claimed that "tourism will suffer and the beauty of your country is in jeopardy". The advert was later ruled "misleading" by the Advertising Standards Authority.

When planning consent was granted by the Scottish government in March 2013, Trump vowed to "spend whatever monies are necessary to see to it that these huge and unsightly industrial wind turbines are never constructed."

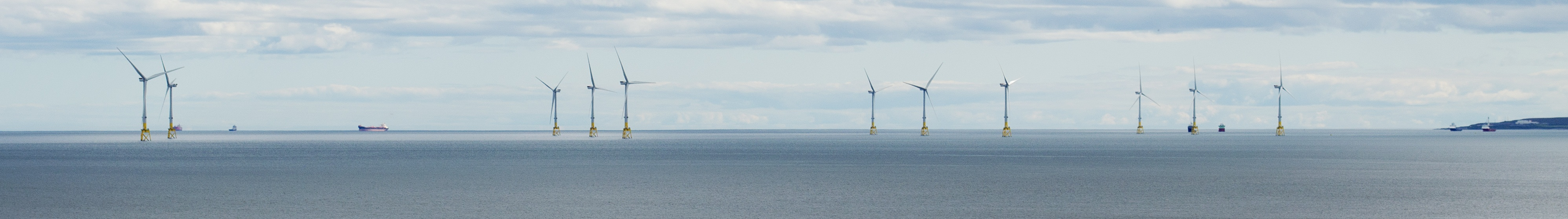
All eleven turbines of the completed wind farm

=== Court case ===
In May 2013, Trump launched a legal challenge against the Scottish government's decision to grant planning permission for the wind farm. The appellants, Trump International Golf Club Scotland Ltd, opposed consent for the development. It was challenged on two grounds. First, it was claimed that the Scottish Minister's consent under the Electricity Act 1989 section 36 to build a wind farm was ultra vires. Trump Ltd argued Sch 9, para 3 gave rise to a necessary implication that only holders of licences to generate electricity, or exempt persons, could get section 36 consent. This meant the Scottish Ministers were not persons able to give consent, under sections 5 or 6 of the Electricity Act 1989. Second, Trump claimed that because condition 14 of the consent required submission and approval of a design statement, condition 14 was void for uncertainty. The hearing began at the Court of Session in November 2013, but was rejected in February 2014. An appeal against the decision was heard at the Court of Session in January 2015, but Trump lost the appeal in June 2015. After the decision Trump said he would appeal before both the Supreme Court of the UK and the European Courts. The UK Supreme Court ruled unanimously against this appeal in December 2015.

== Judgment ==
=== Court of Session ===
On the first ground, the Lord President stated "The scheme of the legislation is that the granting of a consent under section 36 and the granting of a licence or an exemption under sections 6 and 5 respectively, are two separate processes". On the second ground, he stated, "If a design statement is not satisfactory to the Ministers, there will be no approval of the construction method statement without which the development cannot begin. There is no ambiguity when condition 14 is read in that way". The other two judges who sat on the case concurred with this reasoning.

=== Supreme Court ===
The Supreme Court unanimously held that the planning permission was sound. The nature of the Electricity Act 1989 did not support the appellant's argument. The Act sought to liberalise the electricity market in Britain, and it is not necessary for those who build generating stations to be those generating the electricity. Even if condition 14 was unenforceable, that would not be enough to invalidate the consent.

Lord Hodge gave the first speech (Lord Neuberger and Lord Reed agreeing). He held under the Electricity Act 1989 section 36, consent to build a wind farm was available to anyone, before getting a licence under s 6 or a s 5 exemption. Condition 14 promoted important environmental benefits.

Lord Mance agreed, adding that he ‘would not encourage advocates or courts to adopt too rigid or sequential an approach to the processes of consideration of the express terms and of consideration of the possibility of an implication.’ Both Lord Neuberger and Lord Clarke recognised in M&S that both express and implied terms are part of the process of construction as a whole.

Lord Carnwath agreed, adding that implication of terms in planning cases should follow the same basic principles of implication as elsewhere in the law, disapproving Sevenoaks DC [2004] EWHC 771 (Admin).

== Significance ==
Alex Salmond, the former Scottish First Minister stated that Donald Trump was "three times a loser". A spokesperson for the Trump Organization responded to this by saying: "Does anyone care what this man thinks? He’s a hasbeen and totally irrelevant."

The director of WWF Scotland stated, "This result is great news for Scotland and for all those interested in tackling climate change and creating jobs".

Vattenfall decided to proceed with 11 turbines in the 92 MW wind farm in July 2016.

In November 2016, President-elect Donald Trump encouraged Nigel Farage to campaign in opposition to wind farms. It was unclear if he would "use the power of the presidency to advance his business interests."

== See also ==
- Donald Trump and wind energy
- UK enterprise law
- Town and country planning in the United Kingdom
- Scottish legal system
- Electricity Act 1989
- 2015 Judgments of the Supreme Court of the United Kingdom
