= Investors Compensation Scheme Ltd v West Bromwich Building Society =

English contract law case

ICS Ltd v West Bromwich BS
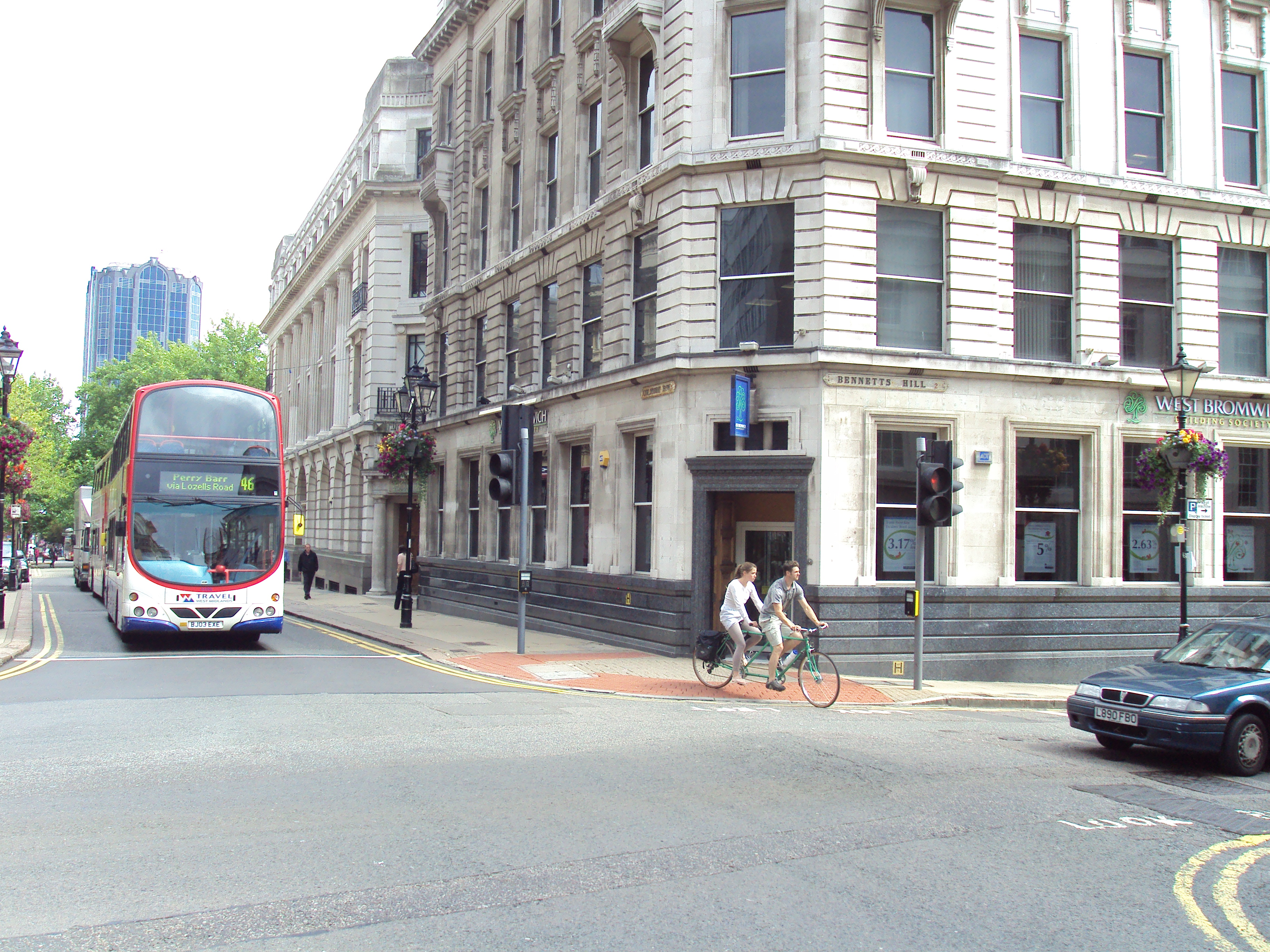
- Court: House of Lords
- Full case name: Investors Compensation Scheme Ltd v West Bromwich Building Society
- Citations: [1997] UKHL 28, [1998] 1 WLR 896, [1998] 1 All ER 98

Court membership
- Judges sitting: Lord Goff of Chieveley, Lord Lloyd of Berwick, Lord Hoffmann, Lord Hope of Craighead, Lord Clyde

Case opinions
- Lord Hoffmann, Lord Lloyd (dissenting)

Keywords
- Construction, interpretation, context

Investors Compensation Scheme Ltd. v West Bromwich Building Society [1997] UKHL 28 is a frequently-cited English contract law case which laid down that a contextual approach must be taken to the interpretation of contracts.

Lord Hoffmann set out five principles, so that contract should be construed according to:

1. what a reasonable person having all the background knowledge would have understood
2. where the background includes anything in the 'matrix of fact' that could affect the language's meaning
3. but excluding prior negotiations, for the policy of reducing litigation
4. where meaning of words is not to be deduced literally, but contextually
5. on the presumption that people do not easily make linguistic mistakes

== Facts ==
Investors received negligent advice from their financial advisers, solicitors and building societies, including West Bromwich Building Society ('West Bromwich BS'). They had claims in tort and for breach of statutory duty. The investors had been encouraged by financiers to enter "Home Income Plans", which meant mortgaging their properties to get cash that they would put into equity linked bonds. They lost money when house prices and stocks fell. Under the Financial Services Act 1986 section 54 the Securities and Investments Board started the Investors Compensation Scheme Ltd, where investors could be directly compensated for their losses, and ICS would try recoup the cost by suing the building societies on everyone’s behalf. Accordingly, to get the compensation investors signed a contract to assign their claims to ICS. But in section 3(b) of the claim form the assignment excluded ‘Any claim (whether sounding in rescission for undue influence or otherwise) that you have or may have against the West Bromwich Building Society’, so that investors could still sue on some claims individually. While ICS Ltd was suing, West Bromwich BS argued that ‘or otherwise’ meant that claims for damages, as well as rescission, had not been assigned. ICS Ltd argued that the clause actually meant that claims for damages had been assigned, because ‘or otherwise’ referred to rescission based claims other than undue influence, but not damages.

Evans-Lombe J held that the right to claim rescission had been retained but the right to claim damages had been assigned. Leggatt LJ overturned the High Court, and ICS Ltd appealed.

== Judgment ==
The House of Lords held by a majority that the right to claim rescission was retained by the investors, but the right to claim for damages had indeed been assigned. Construed in its context, the words ‘Any claim (whether sounding in rescission for undue influence or otherwise) that you have or may have against the West Bromwich Building Society’ in effect had meant 'Any claim sounding in rescission (whether for undue influence or otherwise)'. It followed that ICS Ltd could sue West Bromwich BS, and other building societies, to vindicate the investors' claims. Lord Lloyd dissented.

Lord Hoffmann stated the following.

In the Court of Appeal, Leggatt L.J. said that the judge's interpretation was "not an available meaning of the words." "Any claim (whether sounding in rescission for undue influence or otherwise)" could not mean "Any claim sounding in rescission (whether for undue influence or otherwise)" and that was that. He was unimpressed by the alleged commercial nonsense of the alternative construction.

My Lords, I will say at once that I prefer the approach of the learned judge. But I think I should preface my explanation of my reasons with some general remarks about the principles by which contractual documents are nowadays construed. I do not think that the fundamental change which has overtaken this branch of the law, particularly as a result of the speeches of Lord Wilberforce in Prenn v Simmonds [1971] 1 WLR 1381, 1384-1386 and Reardon Smith Line Ltd v Yngvar Hansen-Tangen [1976] 1 WLR 989, is always sufficiently appreciated. The result has been, subject to one important exception, to assimilate the way in which such documents are interpreted by judges to the common sense principles by which any serious utterance would be interpreted in ordinary life. Almost all the old intellectual baggage of "legal" interpretation has been discarded. The principles may be summarised as follows:

(1) Interpretation is the ascertainment of the meaning which the document would convey to a reasonable person having all the background knowledge which would reasonably have been available to the parties in the situation in which they were at the time of the contract.

(2) The background was famously referred to by Lord Wilberforce as the "matrix of fact," but this phrase is, if anything, an understated description of what the background may include. Subject to the requirement that it should have been reasonably available to the parties and to the exception to be mentioned next, it includes absolutely anything which would have affected the way in which the language of the document would have been understood by a reasonable man.

(3) The law excludes from the admissible background the previous negotiations of the parties and their declarations of subjective intent. They are admissible only in an action for rectification. The law makes this distinction for reasons of practical policy and, in this respect only, legal interpretation differs from the way we would interpret utterances in ordinary life. The boundaries of this exception are in some respects unclear. But this is not the occasion on which to explore them.

(4) The meaning which a document (or any other utterance) would convey to a reasonable man is not the same thing as the meaning of its words. The meaning of words is a matter of dictionaries and grammars; the meaning of the document is what the parties using those words against the relevant background would reasonably have been understood to mean. The background may not merely enable the reasonable man to choose between the possible meanings of words which are ambiguous but even (as occasionally happens in ordinary life) to conclude that the parties must, for whatever reason, have used the wrong words or syntax. (see Mannai Investments Co Ltd v Eagle Star Life Assurance Co Ltd [1997] 2 WLR 945

(5) The "rule" that words should be given their "natural and ordinary meaning" reflects the common sense proposition that we do not easily accept that people have made linguistic mistakes, particularly in formal documents. On the other hand, if one would nevertheless conclude from the background that something must have gone wrong with the language, the law does not require judges to attribute to the parties an intention which they plainly could not have had. Lord Diplock made this point more vigorously when he said in The Antaios Compania Neviera SA v Salen Rederierna AB [1985] 1 AC 191, 201:

"... if detailed semantic and syntactical analysis of words in a commercial contract is going to lead to a conclusion that flouts business commonsense, it must be made to yield to business commonsense."

If one applies these principles, it seems to me that the judge must be right and, as we are dealing with one badly drafted clause which is happily no longer in use, there is little advantage in my repeating his reasons at greater length. The only remark of his which I would respectfully question is when he said that he was "doing violence" to the natural meaning of the words. This is an over-energetic way to describe the process of interpretation. Many people, including politicians, celebrities and Mrs. Malaprop, mangle meanings and syntax but nevertheless communicate tolerably clearly what they are using the words to mean. If anyone is doing violence to natural meanings, it is they rather than their listeners.

[...]

Finally, on this part of the case, I must make some comments upon the judgment of the Court of Appeal. Leggatt L.J. said that his construction was "the natural and ordinary meaning of the words used." I do not think that the concept of natural and ordinary meaning is very helpful when, on any view, the words have not been used in a natural and ordinary way. In a case like this, the court is inevitably engaged in choosing between competing unnatural meanings. Secondly, Leggatt L.J. said that the judge's construction was not an "available meaning" of the words. If this means that judges cannot, short of rectification, decide that the parties must have made mistakes of meaning or syntax, I respectfully think he was wrong. The proposition is not, I would suggest, borne out by his citation from Alice Through the Looking Glass. Alice and Humpty Dumpty were agreed that the word "glory" did not mean "a nice knock-down argument." Anyone with a dictionary could see that. Humpty Dumpty's point was that "a nice knock-down argument" was what he meant by using the word "glory." He very fairly acknowledged that Alice, as a reasonable young woman, could not have realised this until he told her, but once he had told her, or if, without being expressly told, she could have inferred it from the background, she would have had no difficulty in understanding what he meant.

Lord Goff, Lord Hope and Lord Clyde concurred.

== See also ==
- Rearden Smith Lines Ltd v Hansen Tangan [1976] 1 WLR 989
- Principles of European Contract Law Article 5-102 (a) preliminary negotiations are relevant to interpretation and so is (g) good faith and fair dealing.
- Hollier v Rambler Motors (AMC) Ltd [1972] 1 All ER 399
- Gillespie Bros v Roy Bowles Ltd [1973] 1 QB 400, 415, Lord Denning, ‘judges have… time after time, sanctioned a departure from the ordinary meaning. They have done it under the guise of ‘construing’ the clause. They assume that the party cannot have intended anything so unreasonable. So they construe the clause ‘strictly’. They cut down the ordinary meaning of the words and reduce them to reasonable proportions. They use all their skill and art to that end.’
- Rainy Sky SA v Kookmin Bank [2011] UKSC 50
- Chartbrook Ltd v Persimmon Homes Ltd [2009] UKHL 38
