= Howard Smith Ltd v Ampol Petroleum Ltd =

1974 United Kingdom company case law

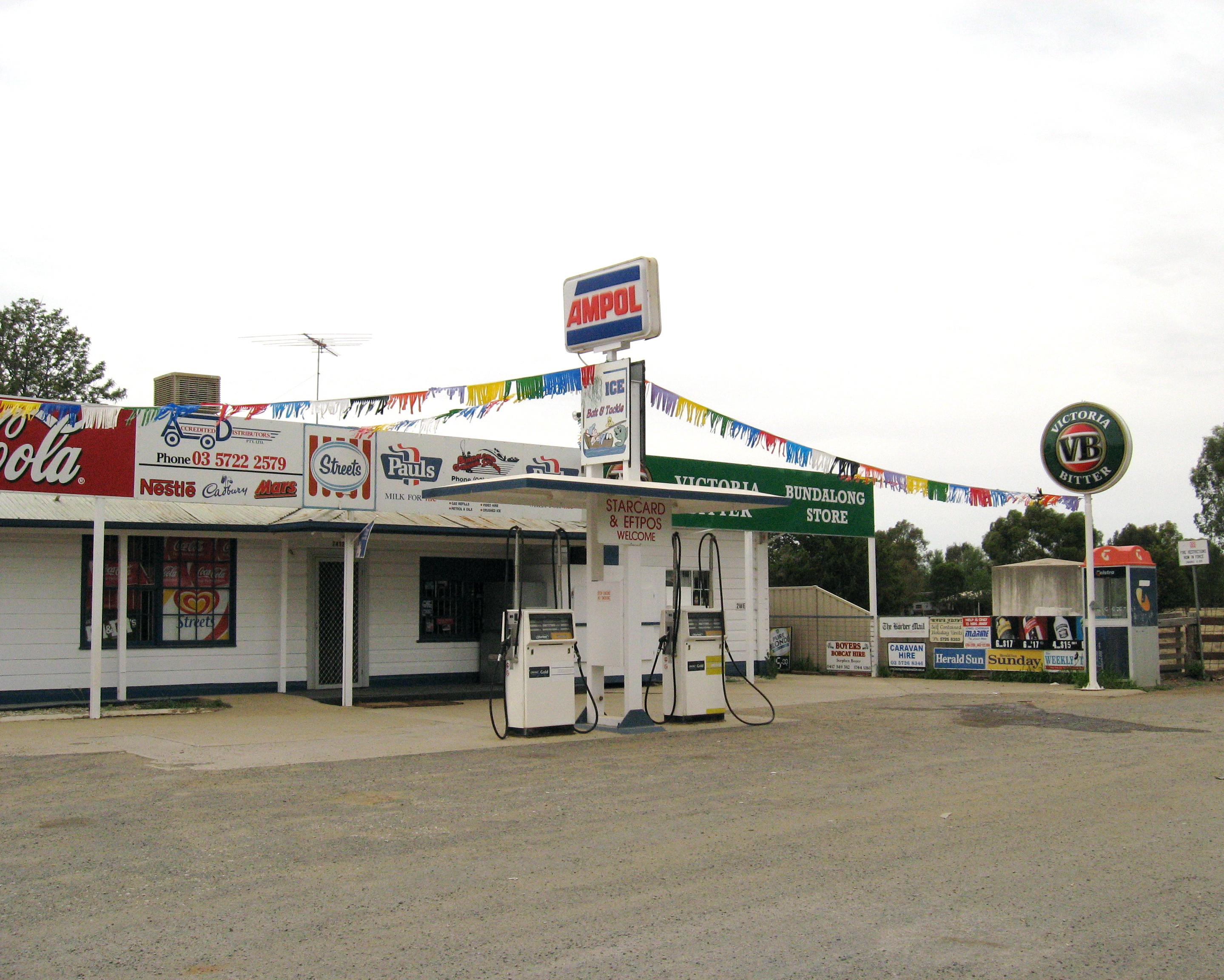
- Court: Judicial Committee of the Privy Council
- Decided: 14 February 1974
- Citations: [1974] UKPC 3, [1974] AC 821; [1975] 1 NSWLR 68

Case history
- Prior action: Howard Smith Ltd v Ampol Petroleum Ltd [1972] 2 NSWLR 850

Court membership
- Judges sitting: Lord Wilberforce, Lord Diplock, Lord Simon of Glaisdale, Lord Cross of Chelsea, Lord Kilbrandon

Keywords
- Directors' duties, improper purpose, hostile takeover

Howard Smith Ltd v Ampol Petroleum Ltd [1974] UKPC 3 is a leading company law case, concerning the duty of directors to act only for "proper purposes". This duty has been codified into the Companies Act 2006 section 171, and arises particularly in cases involving takeover bids.

== Facts ==
RW Miller was embroiled in a hostile takeover bid, by a large petrol company called Ampol. Ampol already controlled (with an associated company) 55% of the shares. The directors did not want Ampol to buy the shares of RW Miller as Howard Smith had bettered terms for take over by offering employment to the directors even in the future. So the directors of RW Miller issued $10m of new shares. They said it was to finance the completion of two tankers. The shares were given to Howard Smith Ltd who were going to take over RW Miller, and that blocked Ampol’s rival bid. Without the issue, Howard Smith Ltd had no hope of succeeding in taking over the company. But with the new issue, Ampol could not complete its acquisition. Ampol commenced proceedings in the Supreme Court of NSW.

Street CJ in Eq said that the argument of the directors that the tanker purchase was the dominant purpose was ‘unreal and unconvincing’. The issue of shares to Howard Smith was held to be invalid. Howard Smith sought and obtained conditional leave to appeal to the Privy Council. 1

== Judgment ==
The Privy Council dismissed the appeal.

Lord Wilberforce held that the issue of shares was within power but that it was exercised for an improper purpose. ‘To define in advance [what that means is] impossible.’ It must be adjudged ‘in the light of modern conditions’, and referred back to Hogg v Cramphorn Ltd. His judgment continued.

The extreme argument on one side is that, for validity, what is required is bona fide exercise of the power in the interests of the company: that once it is found that the directors were not motivated by self-interest—i.e. by a desire to retain their control of the company or their positions on the board—the matter is concluded in their favour and that the court will not inquire into the validity of their reasons for making the issue...

It can be accepted, as one would only expect, that the majority of cases in which issues of shares are challenged in the courts are cases in which the vitiating element is the self-interest of the directors, or at least the purpose of the directors to preserve their own control of the management.

Further it is correct to say that where the self-interest of the directors is involved, they will not be permitted to assert that their action was bona fide thought to be, or was, in the interest of the company; pleas to this effect have invariably been rejected... just as trustees who buy trust property are not permitted to assert that they paid a good price.

But it does not follow from this, as the appellants assert, that the absence of any element of self-interest is enough to make an issue valid. Self-interest is only one, though no doubt the commonest, instance of improper motive: and, before one can say that a fiduciary power has been exercised for the purpose for which it was conferred, a wider investigation may have to be made...

It would be wrong for the court to substitute its opinion for that of the management, or indeed to question the correctness of the management’s decision, on such a question, if bona fide arrived at. There is no appeal on merits from management decisions to courts of law: nor will courts of law assume to act as a kind of supervisory board over decisions within the powers of management honestly arrived at.

== See also ==
- Eclairs Group Ltd v JKX Oil & Gas plc
