= Eclairs Group Ltd v JKX Oil & Gas plc =

UK legal case

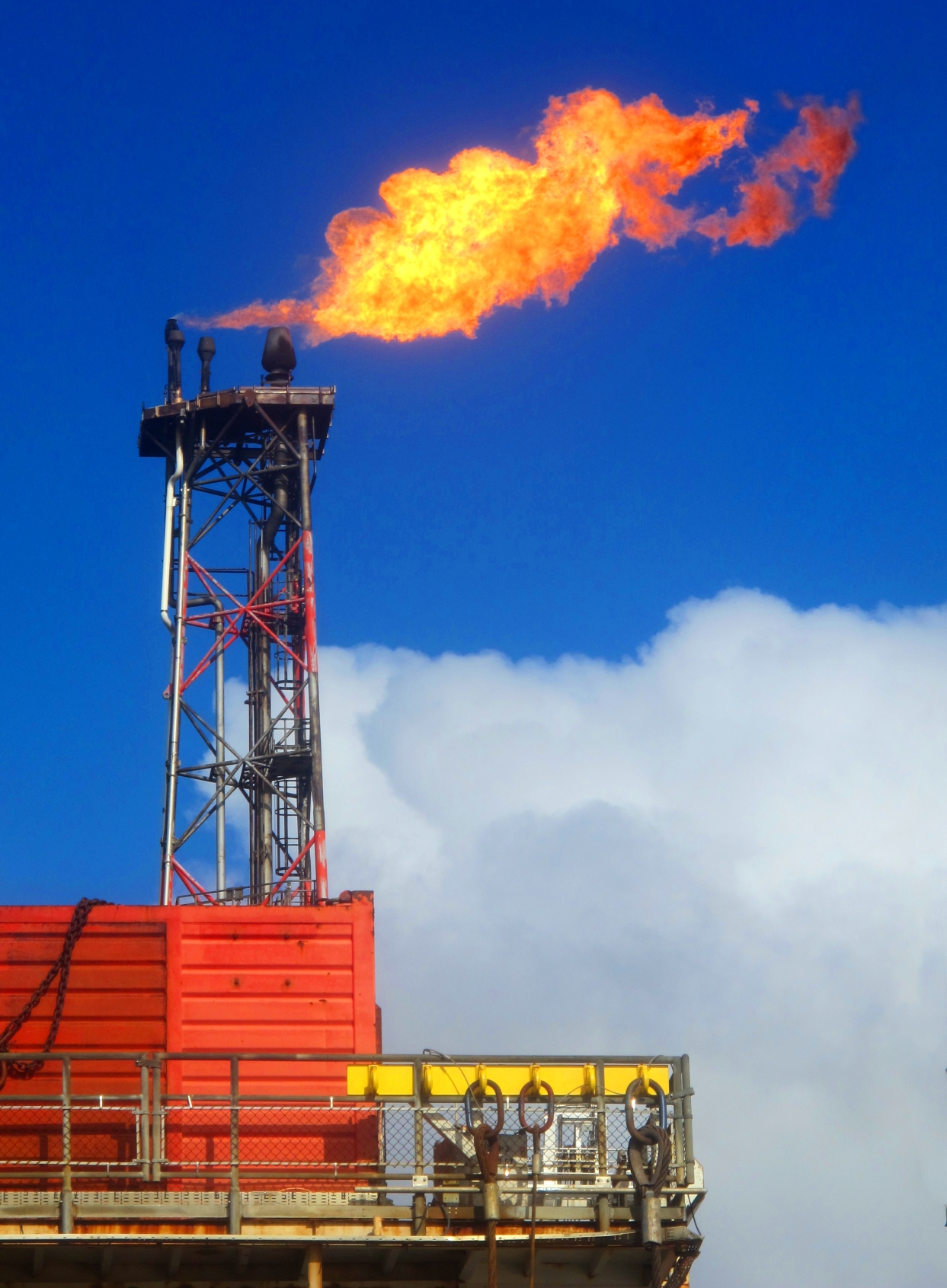
- Court: Supreme Court
- Full case name: Eclairs Group Ltd v JKX Oil & Gas plc, Glengary Overseas Ltd v JKX Oil & Gas plc
- Decided: 2 December 2015
- Citation: [2015] UKSC 71

Case history
- Appealed from: [2014] EWCA Civ 640

Court membership
- Judges sitting: Lord Neuberger; Lord Mance; Lord Clarke; Lord Sumption; Lord Hodge

Eclairs Group Ltd v JKX Oil & Gas plc [2015] UKSC 71 (2 December 2015) was a decision of the United Kingdom Supreme Court relating to the exercise of directors' powers for a proper purpose under English company law.

The Supreme Court's decision was slightly unusual in that a minority (Lord Sumption and Lord Hodge) proposed refining the law in relation to the requirements for causation in relation to actions of the directors where the board had multiple purposes, some of which were improper and some of which were not. However the majority, after initially supporting their position, then declined to express an opinion in the absence of oral argument on that particular point. Accordingly, the legal position in relation to what degree of causation is needed with respect to the improper purpose and the taking of the corporate action is left in a somewhat nebulous state.

== Facts ==
JKX Oil & Gas Plc (referred to in the judgment as "JKX") was an English company whose shares were listed on the London Stock Exchange. It was the parent company in a group whose main business consisted of development and exploitation of oil and gas reserves, primarily in Russia and Ukraine. The company had been struggling, and its difficulties were reflected by its share price falling to historically low levels.

In 2013, the directors of JKX perceived that it had become the target of a so-called "corporate raid" by two minority shareholders, Eclairs Group Ltd (controlled by trusts associated with Igor Kolomoisky and by Gennadiy Bogolyubov) and Glengary Overseas Ltd (controlled by Alexander Zhukov and Mr Ratskevyich).

The articles of association of JKX provided that the company had power to issue a disclosure notice calling for information about persons interested in its shares, and empowering the board to restrict the exercise of rights attaching to shares in the event of non-compliance. The court noted that this power was largely similar to that now found in sections 793–797 of the Companies Act 2006, save that under the statute the power is vested in the courts whereas under the articles of JKX the power was vested in the board.

JKX issued disclosure notices between 20 and 26 March 2013 and on 13 May, requesting information from Eclairs, Glengary and Messrs. Kolomoisky, Bogolyubov, Zhukov, and Ratskevyich about the number of shares held, their beneficial ownership, and any agreements or arrangements between the persons interested in them. The responses admitted the existence of interests in the shares but denied that there was any agreement or arrangement. On 23 May 2013, Eclairs publicly invited shareholders to oppose the resolutions proposed at the forthcoming annual general meeting on 5 June 2013, including resolutions for the re-election of certain directors.

At a meeting on 30 May, the JKX board considered that there were agreements or arrangements between the addressees of the disclosure notices which had not been disclosed in the responses. It resolved to exercise the powers under the company's articles to issue restriction notices in relation to the shares held by Eclairs and Glengary, suspending their right to vote at general meetings and restricting the right of transfer.

Eclairs and Glengary challenged the restriction notices, relying on the proper purpose rule at section 171(b) of the Companies Act 2006 (a director must "only exercise powers for the purposes for which they are conferred”). They were successful at first instance, but the decision of Mann J was overturned on appeal. Eclairs and Glengary then appealed to the Supreme Court.

== Judgment ==
The core question according to Lord Sumption, could be phrased as follows:

in bald summary, what are the proper purposes for which the board may restrict the exercise of rights attaching to shares, and in what circumstances can the restrictions be challenged on the ground that they were imposed for a collateral purpose?

=== History of the rule ===
Lord Sumption noted that the proper purpose rule has its origin in the equitable doctrine which is known - misleadingly - as the doctrine of "fraud on a power". For a number of different purposes, the early Court of Chancery in England attached the consequences of fraud to acts which were not actually fraudulent at all, but despite being honest and unexceptional were treated as unconscionable according to equitable principles. Most relevantly, the Court would set aside dispositions under powers conferred by trust deeds if they were outside the purpose for which it was conferred (even if they fell within the strict words of the power itself). Lord Sumption noted that the reported cases relating to the doctrine date back to the mid-1700s in Lane v Page and Aleyn v Belchier.

Lord Sumption endorsed the comments of Lord Parker in Vatcher v Paull where he said the doctrine "does not necessarily denote any conduct on the part of the appointor amounting to fraud in the common law meaning of the term or any conduct which could be properly termed dishonest or immoral. It merely means that the power has been exercised for a purpose, or with an intention, beyond the scope of or not justified by the instrument creating the power."

The Supreme Court noted that a company director differs from an express trustee, but confirmed that a director is unquestionably a fiduciary with respect to his powers, and that accordingly the exercise of those powers is limited to the purpose for which they were conferred.

=== Application of the rule ===
The Supreme Court held that the proper purpose rule is concerned with abuse of power: a company director must not, subjectively, act for an improper reason. Under article 42 of the company's articles of association, the power to restrict the rights attaching to shares is ancillary to the statutory power to call for information under section 793 of the Companies Act. Article 42 has three closely related purposes:

1. to induce a shareholder to comply with a disclosure notice;
2. to protect the company and its shareholders against having to make decisions about their respective interests in ignorance of relevant information; and
3. as a punitive sanction for a failure to comply with a disclosure notice.

Seeking to influence the outcome of shareholders' resolutions or the company's general meetings is no part of those proper purposes. The proper purpose rule applies to article 42. It was irrelevant whether Eclairs and Glengary could have averted the imposition of restrictions on their rights as shareholders by giving different answers to the questions. The proper purpose rule is the principal means by which equity enforces directors' proper conduct, and is fundamental to the constitutional distinction between board and shareholder.

A battle for control of the company is probably the context where the proper purpose rule has the most valuable part to play. Lord Sumption and Lord Hodge considered that where the directors have multiple concurrent purposes, the relevant purpose or purposes are those without which the decision would not have been made. If that purpose or those purposes are improper, the decision is ineffective. Mann J had found as a fact that four of the six directors were concerned only with the effect of the restriction notices on the outcome of the general meeting, and accordingly, they had acted for an improper purpose.

=== Multiple purposes ===
Lord Sumption was concerned about the position where: "there are multiple purposes, all influential in different degrees but some proper and others not". His preferred solution (with which Lord Hodge agreed) was that a causation based "but for" test should be applied to whether the improper purpose caused the exercise of the power. In his view "if there were proper reasons for exercising the power and it would still have been exercised for those reasons even in the absence of improper ones, it is difficult to see why justice should require the decision to be set aside." He cited with approval the Australian High Court's test that the improper purpose must be "causative". He also drew support from obiter dictum of Lord Wilberforce in the leading case of Howard Smith Ltd v Ampol Petroleum Ltd.

Lord Neuberger, Lord Mance and Lord Clarke all agreed that the appeals should be allowed, but decline to express a concluded view on the application of a "but for" test to the proper purpose rule proposed by Lord Sumption and supported by Lodge Hodge. They felt that the previous settled law that the court should look to the "primary purpose". This was not a matter on which the court should rule without the benefit of argument. Lord Mance was particularly concerned that after the Supreme Court had circulated its draft judgment to the parties, the appellants responded by stating that they had argued their case on the basis that the "principal purpose" test was not being challenged by the respondents, and the respondents had responded by arguing the proposed test on causation was a "new development in the law" and so the appeals should not be allowed and/or that there should be a further hearing on the issue of causation.

Lord Sumption noted their reservations, but pointed out that whilst oral argument had not been heard on that specific point, it had been canvassed in the parties' written submissions. In the event all five members of the Court agreed to allow the appeal, and Lord Sumption and Lord Mance have made clear their views on that particular point of law.

=== Obiter comments ===
Lord Sumption commented that generally held (but not commonly stated) view that the shareholders do not owe a duty of loyalty to each other or to the company.

Directors owe a duty of loyalty to the company, but shareholders owe no loyalty either to the company or its board. Within broad limits, derived for the most part from Part 30 of the Companies Act 2006 (Protection of Members against Unfair Prejudice) and the City Code on Takeovers and Mergers, they are entitled to exercise their rights in their own interest as they see it and to challenge the existing management for good reasons or bad.

== Commentary ==
One commentator noted that the case offers "valuable guidance" in relation to the proper purpose rule, and another the case casts "considerable light" on the key legal considerations, including in particular discerning the proper purpose in relation to any particular matter, and the proper way for the courts to examine such board decisions.

However, at least one commentator thought that "for corporate advisers and directors, the decision may present some difficulties."

== See also ==
- United Kingdom company law
