= Beghal v DPP =

2015 judgment of the Supreme Court of the United Kingdom

- Court: Supreme Court of the United Kingdom
- Full case name: Beghal (Appellant) v Director of Public Prosecutions (Respondent)
- Argued: 12–13 November 2014
- Decided: 22 July 2015
- Neutral citation: [2015] UKSC 49

Case history
- Prior history: [2013] EWHC 2573 (Admin)

Holding
- Appeal dismissed, the powers under the Terrorism Act 2000 are proportionate.

Case opinions
- Majority: Lords Neuberger, Dyson, Hughes and Hodge
- Dissent: Lord Kerr

Area of law
- Article 5, ECHR; Article 6, ECHR; Article 8, ECHR; Terrorism Act 2000

Beghal v DPP was a 2015 judgment of the Supreme Court of the United Kingdom concerning powers of the police in England and Wales.

== Facts ==
Sylvie Beghal is the wife of Djamel Beghal. In January 2011 she was returning from visiting her husband in Paris when the police stopped her as she was passing through East Midlands Airport. They questioned her under Schedule 7, Paragraph 2 of the Terrorism Act 2000 whereby no reasonable suspicion of past or future offences is required, documents can be copied and retained and individuals can be detained for a maximum of six hours.

Beghal refused to answer most of the questions and was charged with willfully failing to comply with the requirement to answer questions under Schedule 7, Paragraph 18 of the Terrorism Act 2000 (Schedule 7).

Although Beghal pleaded guilty to this offence and received a conditional discharge she brought proceedings arguing that the police powers under Schedule 7 breached her rights under Articles 5 (right to liberty), 6 (right to a fair trial) and 8 (right to privacy) of the European Convention on Human Rights (Convention).

== Judgment ==
=== Magistrates' Court ===
Beghal pleaded guilty to the offence under Schedule 7, Paragraph 18(1)(a) before District Judge Temperley at Leicester Magistrates' Court on 12 December 2011. She appealed to the High Court by way of Case Stated.

=== High Court ===
Beghal's appeal under articles 5, 6 and 8 were all dismissed. However Lord Justice Gross did conclude that:

146. It is one thing to conclude that the Schedule 7 powers of examination neither engage nor violate a defendant’s Art. 6 rights; it is another to conclude that there is no room for improvement. For our part, we would urge those concerned to consider a legislative amendment, introducing a statutory bar to the introduction of Schedule 7 admissions in a subsequent criminal trial. The terms of any such legislation would require careful reflection, having regard to the legitimate interests of all parties but, given the sensitivities to which the Schedule 7 powers give rise, there would be at least apparent attraction in clarifying legislation putting the matter beyond doubt.

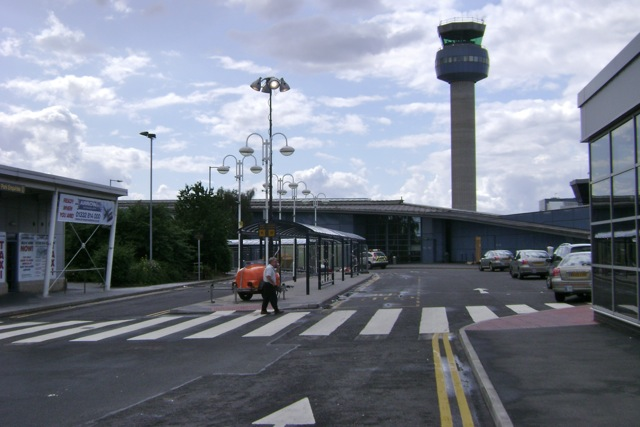
Mrs Beghal was questioned at East Midlands Airport.

=== Supreme Court ===
The Supreme Court dismissed Beghal's appeal by a majority of 4-1. Lord Hughes delivered the leading judgment and dealt with the three Convention articles in turn.

==== Article 5 (Right to Liberty) ====
It was held that although the power to detain a person for six hours falls within the scope of Article 5(1)(b) of the Convention this "was for no longer than was necessary for the completion of the process. There was no requirement to attend a police station. Accordingly, there was in this case no breach of article 5."

==== Article 6 (Right to a fair trial) ====
Article 6 was found to have no application in this case because answers given under a Schedule 7 interview would be inadmissible as per section 78 of the Police and Criminal Evidence Act.

==== Article 8 (Right to Privacy) ====
While it was held that there was an interference with Beghal's right to privacy this was found to be justified in accordance with Article 8(2). Lord Hughes concluded:

51. Overall, the level of intrusion into the privacy of the individual is, for the reasons which have been explained above, comparatively light and not beyond the Page 23 reasonable expectations of those who travel across the UK’s international borders. Given the safeguards set out above, it is not an unreasonable burden to expect citizens to bear in the interests of improving the prospects of preventing or detecting terrorist outrages. In those circumstances, the port questioning and associated search powers represent a fair balance between the rights of the individual and the interests of the community at large and are thus not an unlawful breach of article 8.

==== Lord Kerr's dissent ====
Lord Kerr would have found the Schedule 7 provisions to be incompatible with Articles 5, 6 and 8 for the following reasons:

1. The powers are not 'in accordance with the law' given the potential for their arbitrary use.
2. The powers go beyond what is necessary to accomplish the aim of combatting terrorism.
3. There is not a proper balance between the rights of the individual and the interests of the wider community.

== Reaction and aftermath ==
Lawyers for Mrs Beghal indicated that although she was disappointed with the ruling she welcomed Lord Kerr's "blistering" dissent and indicated that they would pursue the case at the European Court of Human Rights.

On 28 February 2019, the European Court of Human Rights disagreed with much of the Supreme Court's majority analysis and unanimously found that a violation of Article 8 (right to respect for private and family life) had occurred. The Court "considered that there was no need to examine the applicant's complaint under Article 5 as it was based on the same facts as her Article 8 complaint." The Court's central complaint was that there were "insufficient safeguards" to Schedule 7 such that, "considered together with the absence of any requirement of “reasonable suspicion”, the Court found that at the time the applicant had been stopped the Schedule 7 powers had not been “in accordance with the law”.

As of March 2019, the UK remains in breach of the Convention and has yet to amend the offending legislation.

== See also ==
- European Convention on Human Rights
- Anti-terrorism legislation
- Djamel Beghal
- Human rights in the United Kingdom
