= R (Tigere) v Secretary of State for Business, Innovation and Skills =

- Court: Supreme Court of the United Kingdom
- Full case name: R (on the application of Tigere) (Appellant) v Secretary of State for Business, Innovation and Skills (Respondent)
- Argued: 24–25 June 2015
- Decided: 29 July 2015
- Neutral citation: [2015] UKSC 57

Case history
- Prior history: [2014] EWCA Civ 1216; [2014] EWHC 2452 (Admin)

Holding
- Appeal allowed, the settlement criterion is a breach of Article 14, ECHR when read with Article 2, Protocol 1.

Case opinions
- Majority: Lady Hale, Lord Kerr, Lord Hughes
- Dissent: Lord Sumption, Lord Reed

Area of law
- Right to education; Student loans; Immigration law

R (Tigere) v Secretary of State for Business, Innovation and Skills was a 2015 judgment of the Supreme Court of the United Kingdom concerning student loans in the United Kingdom.

== Facts ==
Beaurish Tigere arrived in the UK from Zambia at the age of six. She came as a dependent of her father who had a student visa. The father left in 2003 but Tigere remained with her mother who over-stayed. The UK Border Agency became aware of this situation in 2010 and granted them temporary permission to remain which became discretionary leave to remain in 2012. Tigere would have been entitled to apply for indefinite leave to remain in 2018 but until that time she was unable to apply for a student loan despite achieving three A-Levels and a place at Northumbria University to study International Business Management.

The case was brought on behalf of Tigere by Public Interest Lawyers who argued that the policy was an infringement of Tigere's right to education under Article 2 of the First Protocol of the European Convention on Human Rights. This provision reads "[n]o person shall be denied the right to education" and the negative formulation does mean that there is no automatic entitlement to public support. However Tigere argued that this ought to be read in line with Article 14 of the Convention that states her rights "shall be secured without discrimination on any ground" (in this case her immigration status).

== Judgment ==
=== High Court ===
The High Court found in favour of Tigere and held that the blanket ban on her eligibility for a student loan based on her immigration status was a disproportionate interference on her right to education and also constituted discrimination under Article 14.

=== Court of Appeal ===
The Secretary of State appealed the decision to the Court of Appeal which held that the case concerned an area of "national strategic policy for the distribution of scarce resources in a field of great social importance" and therefore a wide margin of appreciation should be afforded to government policy. With this in mind the appeal was allowed.

=== Supreme Court ===
The Supreme Court allowed Ms. Tigere's appeal by a majority of three to two. Lady Hale (with whom Lord Kerr agreed) gave the leading judgment and concluded:

41. Any short-term savings to the public purse by denying these students finance, by way of loans, not grants, are just that, as most of them will eventually qualify for loans, and in the meantime the benefit their enhanced qualifications will bring to the exchequer and the economy have been lost.

Lord Hughes offered a concurring judgment but slightly disagreed with Lady Hale by suggesting that any future rules drawn up by the Secretary of State would not necessarily have to include an 'exceptional case' discretion. In particular he noted:

68. Since it is for the Secretary of State to devise a rule which does not thus infringe, it is of course open to him to adopt one which incorporates an elastic “exceptional case” discretion. But for my part I am wholly satisfied that if he should elect not to include such a discretion, that decision could not result in any infringement of Convention rights.

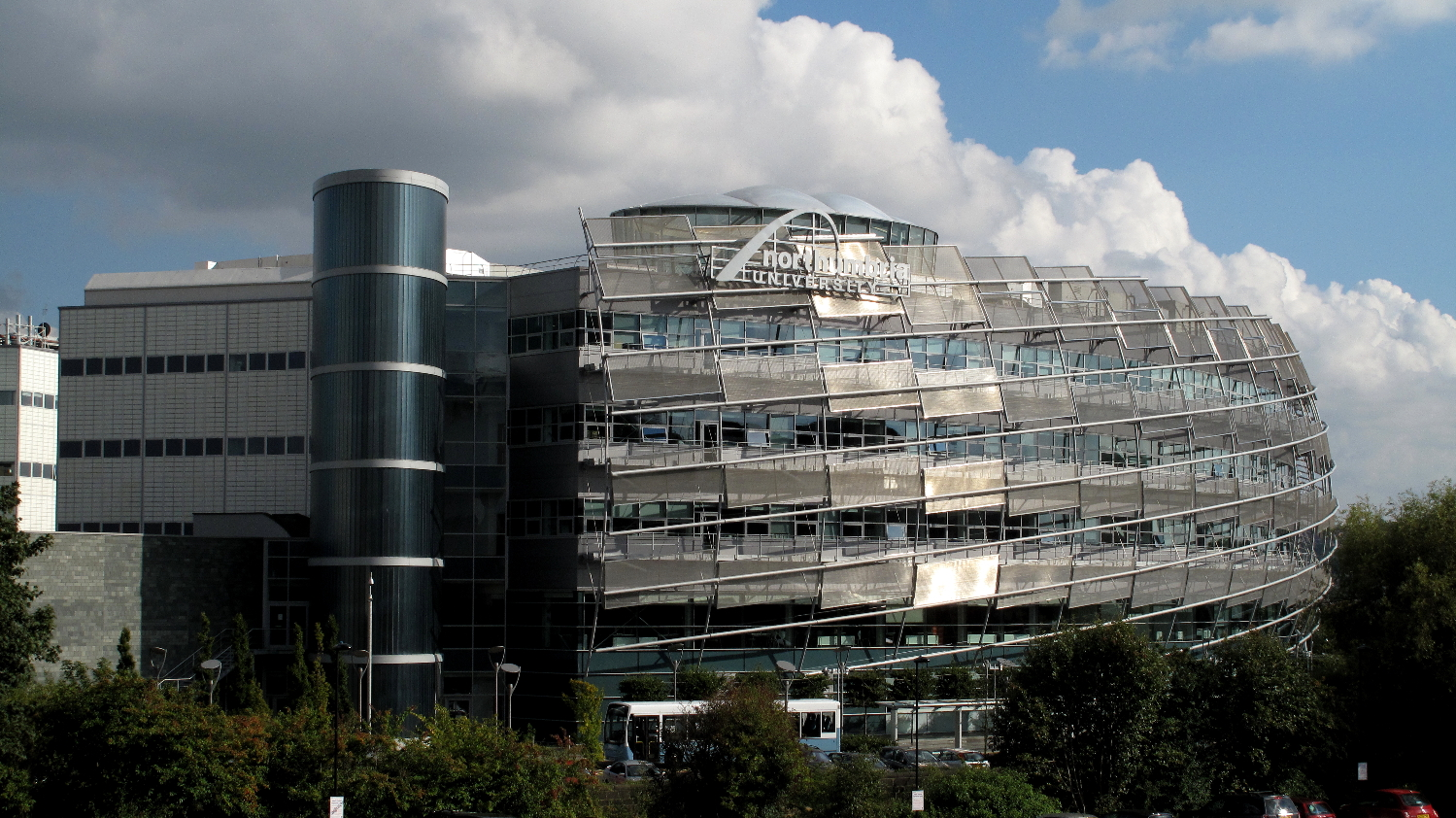
Ms. Tigere's four A-Levels earned her a place at Northumbria University.

The joint minority judgment handed down by Lords Reed and Sumption argued that the appropriate test is whether the scheme is 'manifestly without foundation' and concluded that:

100. In a case where a range of rational and proportionate policy options is open to the decision-maker, the decision which provides the best allocation of scarce resources is a question of social and economic evaluation. These are matters of political and administrative judgment, which the law leaves to those who are answerable to Parliament. They are not questions for a court of law. It is enough to justify the Secretary of State’s choice in this case that discrimination on the basis of residence and settlement are not “manifestly without foundation”.

== Impact ==
Solicitor Paul Heron, of Public Interest Lawyers, said:

“My client is a talented and brave individual and is a credit to the comprehensive school system in Britain.

She has worked hard to obtain excellent grades. Yet she had been denied her opportunity to go to university for the past two years. She has faced this government down.

The regulations which were introduced by the last Tory/Liberal government made absolutely no economic sense and appear to have been dreamed up in a Daily Mail think tank.”

The Coram Children’s Legal Centre provided evidence for the hearing. Their solicitor, Alison East, said:

“These young people have worked hard to do well at school and at college, and aspire to achieve the best they can. Seeing their friends and peers go to university when they cannot and being aware of being held back for as long as 10 years in pursuing qualifications that are essential in a competitive job market inevitably causes these young people to feel marginalised, which is why we are thrilled with the supreme court ruling in this instance.”

Just for Kids Law intervened in the case and estimated that between 600-1,000 students were affected by the restrictions each year. Their director Shauneen Lambe responded to the judgment by saying:

This ruling is wonderful news for many ambitious and academically successful young people, who would otherwise be blocked from ever entering professions which require a degree. We look forward to working with government to make sure their ability to get a loan is restored in time for this year’s A-level results day on 13 August, so that students who have achieved their grades have the chance to take up their university places in the autumn.

The Daily Express noted that the judgment came "as figures revealed that students from the European Union have dodged paying back £43million in taxpayer-funded loans."

== See also ==
- Department of Business, Innovation and Skills
- Student loans in the United Kingdom
- Right to education
- European Convention on Human Rights
- 2015 Judgments of the Supreme Court of the United Kingdom
