= Hotak v London Borough of Southwark =

Hotak v London Borough of Southwark is a 2015 judgment of the Supreme Court of the United Kingdom. It is a landmark judgment concerning homelessness law and concerned the meaning of vulnerability under s.189(1)(c) of Part VII of the Housing Act. Hotak overturned the R. v Camden LBC, ex p. Pereira case which introduced the so-called Pereira Test of vulnerability whereby it was judged against the ordinary homeless person.

== See also ==
- Gatekeeping (UK housing term)
