= Coventry v Lawrence (No. 3) =

- Court: Supreme Court of the United Kingdom
- Full case name: Coventry and others (Respondents) v Lawrence and another (Appellants)
- Argued: 9-10 & 12 February 2015
- Decided: 22 July 2015
- Neutral citation: [2015] UKSC 50

Case history
- Prior history: [2012] EWCA Civ 26

Holding
- The Access to Justice Act 1999 scheme is compatible with Article 6, ECHR.

Case opinions
- Majority: Lords Neuberger, Mance, Dyson, Sumption and Carnwath
- Dissent: Lady Hale and Lord Clarke

Area of law
- Costs in English law; Right to a fair trial

Coventry v Lawrence (No. 3) was a 2015 judgment of the Supreme Court of the United Kingdom concerning the compatibility of the Access to Justice Act 1999 with the European Convention on Human Rights.

== Facts ==
The case is a follow up to Coventry v Lawrence and Coventry v Lawrence (No. 2) and originally began as a claim in nuisance against the operators of a local speedway stadium by two local residents.

The residents' lawyers acted under a conditional fee agreement also more commonly known as 'no win no fee'. They eventually won the case and the stadium owner was ordered to pay 60% of the other sides costs. This included not only their base costs but also a success fee and an After-the-Event (ATE) insurance premium. In this case the stadium owner did not challenge his liability to pay the base costs but argued that his liability for both the success fee and ATE premium would infringe his article 6 (right to a fair trial) and/or article 1 of the first protocol (right to the peaceful enjoyment of one's possessions) rights.

== Judgment ==
=== Supreme Court ===
In Callery v Gray [2002] UKHL 28 Lord Bingham noted that the Access to Justice Act 1999 has three principal aims:

1. To contain the rising cost of legal aid.
2. To improve access to the courts for claimant with meritorious claims.
3. To discourage weak claims.

In spite of this the European Court of Human Rights held in MGN Ltd v UK (2011) 53 EHRR 5 that the scheme had a number of flaws that made it incompatible with Article 10 of the European Convention on Human Rights.

Lord Neuberger gave the leading judgment of the court and held that the present case is not about the flaws of the Access to Justice Act 1999 but rather whether it is a proportionate way of achieving the aims set out by Lord Bingham. With this in mind Neuberger held that:

64. In our judgment, there is a powerful argument that the 1999 Act scheme is compatible with the Convention for the simple reason that it is a general measure which was (i) justified by the need to widen access to justice to litigants following the withdrawal of legal aid; (ii) made following wide consultation and (iii) fell within the wide area of discretionary judgment of the legislature and rule-makers to make.

It was noted that there is no scheme that will perfectly provide access to justice in the wake of the withdrawal of legal aid from most civil cases yet the European Court of Human Rights acknowledges that any such scheme may still be compatible with the European Convention on Human Rights even where it operates harshly in certain individual cases. Overall the Access to Justice Act 1999 provides a "rational and coherent scheme for providing access to justice" that is compatible with the convention.

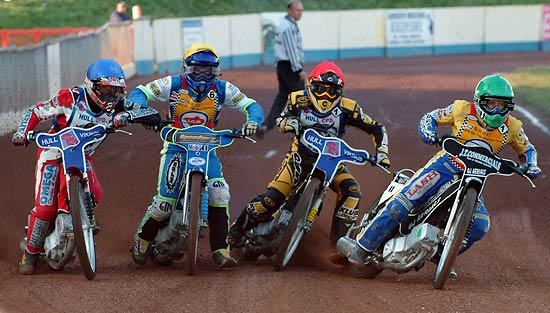
The case began because of the noise caused by a local speedway stadium.

==== Dissenting judgment ====
Lord Clarke (with whom Lady Hale agreed) gave a dissenting judgment that suggested the Access to Justice Act 1999 was not compatible with the Convention because it discriminated between defendants and imposed heavy liabilities on some but not others.

== Reaction ==
Reacting to the judgment David Greene said:

As a claimant lawyer I welcomed the finding but I felt disappointed that after all this time and angst the court said “no change”, notwithstanding that it was the Supreme Court that seemed to start this hare running. The judgment is fascinating reading but the whole process has been somewhat of a damp squib.

Others have considered the potential impact if the minority judgment had been successful:

It is salutary to note that two members of the Supreme Court would have struck down a regime on which a significant section of the legal sector had relied and would have held that there was no legitimate expectation that that regime would continue to obtain. That would, in turn, have led to the extreme repercussions discussed in my previous columns, effectively putting many firms in the very vulnerable position of relying on success in a class action against the government.

It has also been suggested that the case may be taken to the European Court of Human Rights.

== See also ==
- European Convention on Human Rights
- Human rights in the United Kingdom
- 2015 Judgments of the Supreme Court of the United Kingdom
- Costs in English law
