= Pereira v Camden Council =

Pereira v Camden Council was a 1998 Court of Appeal case in England and an important case law authority in housing law. It established the 'Pereira Test' which states that a person is vulnerable (for the purposes of surmounting the homelessness test in the Housing Act 1996) "if their circumstances are such that they would suffer more when homeless than ‘the ordinary homeless person’ and would suffer an injury or other detriment that the ordinary homeless person would not". In reality this often proved an impossibly difficult hurdle for some people to surmount.
