= R (Evans) v Attorney General =

Supreme Court Decision

- Court: Supreme Court of the United Kingdom
- Full case name: Regina (Evans) v Attorney General (Campaign for Freedom of Information intervening)
- Decided: 26 March 2015
- Citations: [2015] UKSC 21, [2015] 1 AC 1787

Case history
- Appealed from: R (Evans) v Attorney General, 2014, Court of Appeal
- Related actions: R (Evans) v Attorney General, 2013, High Court; Evans v Information Commissioner, 2012, Upper Tribunal

Court membership
- Judges sitting: Lord Neuberger of Abbotsbury PSC; Baroness Hale of Richmond DPSC; Lord Mance JSC; Lord Kerr of Tonaghmore JSC; Lord Wilson JSC; Lord Reed JSC; Lord Hughes JSC

R (Evans) v Attorney General (Campaign for Freedom of Information intervening) is a 2015 decision of the Supreme Court of the United Kingdom. It concerned a request for disclosure of communications passing between Charles, Prince of Wales and various government departments.

== Procedural history ==
The case began with an application under the Freedom of Information Act 2000 by journalist Rob Evans. The government departments admitted that they had relevant letters, but "refused to disclose them on the ground that they considered the letters were exempt from disclosure under sections 37, 40 and/or 41". On appeal, the Upper Tribunal determined that "many of the letters, which they referred to as 'advocacy correspondence', should be disclosed".

Rather than appealing the decision of the Upper Tribunal, the Attorney General issued a certificate under section 53(2) of the Freedom of Information Act, effectively overriding the decision of the Upper Tribunal. Evans sought judicial review of the Attorney General's decision to issue the certificate in the High Court.

A divisional court (Lord Judge LCJ, Davis LJ and Globe J) dismissed Evans' claim for judicial review. Evans successfully appealed to the Court of Appeal (Lord Dyson MR, Richards and Pitchford LJJ), which set aside the section 53(2) certificate. The Attorney General then appealed to the Supreme Court, which dismissed the appeal by 5–2 majority (Lord Wilson and Lord Hughes JJSC dissenting).

== Commentary ==
Richard Ekins commented that the majority in Evans was "deliberately misinterpreting Parliament’s enactments to mean something that Parliament clearly did not intend" and called for Parliament to reverse the decision by amending the Freedom of Information Act 2000 to restore the ministerial veto.

== See also ==
- Freedom of Information Act 2000
