= Rainy Sky SA v Kookmin Bank =

Rainy Sky SA and others v Kookmin Bank
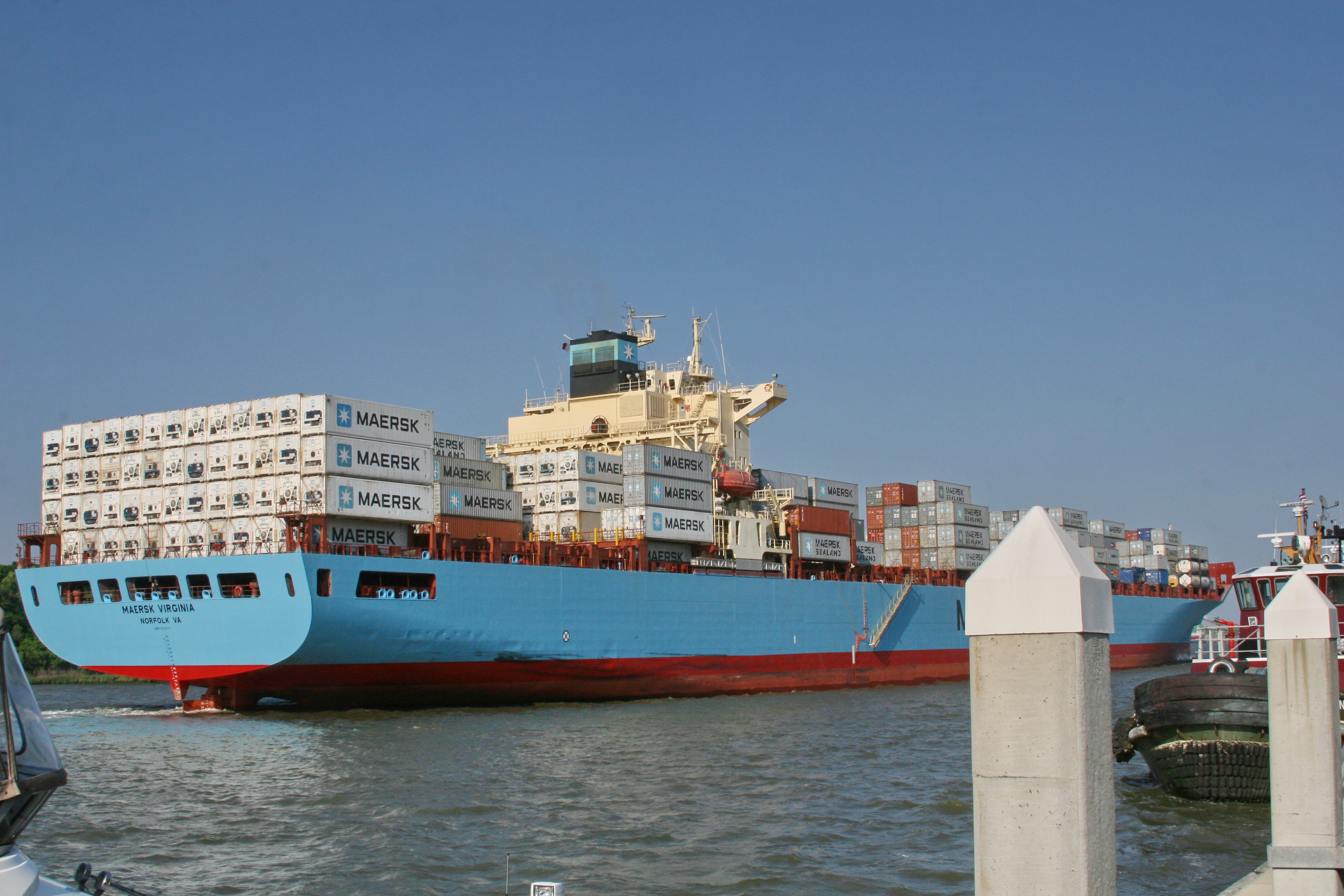
- Court: United Kingdom Supreme Court
- Decided: 2 November 2011
- Citations: [2011] UKSC 50, [2011] CILL 3105, [2011] 1 WLR 2900, 138 Con LR 1, [2012] 1 All ER (Comm) 1

Case history
- Prior action: [2010] EWCA 582

Court membership
- Judges sitting: Lord Phillips, Lord Mance, Lord Kerr, Lord Clarke, Lord Wilson

Case opinions
- Lord Clarke, Patten LJ, Sir Simon Tuckey

Keywords
- Interpretation, business common sense

Rainy Sky SA and others v Kookmin Bank is an English contract law case concerning interpretation of contracts. The Supreme Court confirmed the principle laid down in The Antaios and ICS v West Bromwich Building Society that, if the words of a contract have ambiguous meanings, the court will interpret it in a manner that most accords with "business common sense". There is no requirement for a party to prove that the alternative interpretation is entirely unreasonable.

== Facts ==
Rainy Sky was one of five ship-owning firms that ordered vessels from Jinse Shipbuilding Co, a South Korean shipbuilder, at a cost of US$33,300,000 per ship. The payment was to be made in five equal installments. The contract between Rainy Sky and Jinse permitted Rainy Sky to rescind the contract if various events occurred (such as late delivery or inadequate performance of the vessel, or loss of the vessel before delivery). It also obliged Jinse to refund the payments if it became insolvent, although, in this case, the contract would not automatically be rescinded. Jinse were required to provide the buyers with a performance bond, guaranteeing the repayment of the buyer's money. Jinse obtained such a bond from Kookmin Bank - however, the terms of the bond did not match exactly the terms of the contract, and the central issue in the court case was the interpretation of the bond.

The bond stated (inter alia):

[2] Pursuant to the terms of the Contract, you [Rainy Sky] are entitled, upon your rejection of the Vessel in accordance with the terms of the Contract, your termination, cancellation or rescission of the Contract or upon a Total Loss of the Vessel, to repayment of the pre-delivery instalments..." "[3] ...we hereby ... undertake to pay to you ... all such sums due to you under the Contract..."

Rainy Sky had made two of the required payments when Jinse encountered financial difficulties and entered into an insolvency process. This triggered the requirement for it to repay the money, and, as it could not do this, Rainy Sky called on Kookmin Bank to honour the guarantee. Kookmin, however, claimed that it was under no obligation to make the payment, as the bond only covered "rejection of the vessel" and "termination, cancellation or rescission of the contract", not the insolvency of Jinse.

== Judgment ==
=== High Court ===
In the Commercial Court, Simon J, in a summary judgment, ruled that the bond did cover Jinse's obligation to repay on insolvency. He emphasised "all such sums" in paragraph 3, and stated that Kookmin's construction "has the surprising and uncommercial result that the Buyers would not be able to call on the Bond on the happening of the event which would be most likely to require the first class security."

=== Court of Appeal ===
Kookmin appealed, and in the Court of Appeal, Patten LJ (with whom Thorpe LJ agreed) supported their interpretation. Patten LJ ruled that the word "such" in paragraph 3 could not be ignored, and that, while it was possible that it referred only to the "pre-delivery installments" mentioned in paragraph 2, as a matter of grammar, it was more likely ("[not] in any way evenly balanced") that it referred to the sums defined in paragraph 2 as a whole (namely, those due on rejection, termination, cancellation, rescission, or total loss). He stated that the alternative interpretation "robs paragraph 2 of any purpose or effect." The critical issue was therefore whether or not Kookmin's interpretation was commercially unreasonable. After citing earlier authorities (Wickman v Schuler [1974] AC 235, The Antaios [1984] AC 191 and Chartbrook v Persimmon [2009] UKHL 38), he ruled that, because Kookmin's interpretation was not "absurd or irrational" or "so extreme as to suggest that it was unintended", merely unfavourable to Rainy Sky, it should be accepted. The alternative course would "put us in real danger of substituting our own judgment of the commerciality of the transaction for that of those who were actually party to it."

However, Sir Simon Tuckey delivered a dissenting judgement, in which he stated that Simon J's first-instance view that Kookmin's interpretation was "surprising and uncommercial" was a legitimate reason for rejecting that interpretation, and that the judgement therefore should not be overturned.

=== Supreme Court ===
The Supreme Court allowed Rainy Sky's appeal. Lord Clarke delivered the judgement. Citing the case of Co-operative Wholesale Society Ltd v National Westminster Bank plc [1995] 1 EGLR 97, he accepted the principle that "where the parties have used unambiguous language, the court must apply it", no matter how commercially unreasonable the result. However, in cases of ambiguity, the court should choose the interpretation that is "most consistent with business common sense" - there is no obligation on the party contesting the interpretation to prove that it is so extreme that the parties could not have intended it in any circumstances, as Patten LJ's test would imply.

Referring to Barclays Bank plc v HHY Luxembourg SARL [2010] EWCA Civ 1248, he held that the correct test was stated by Longmore LJ in that case:

"If a clause is capable of two meanings, as on any view this clause is, it is quite possible that neither meaning will flout common sense. In such circumstances, it is much more appropriate to adopt the more, rather than the less, commercial construction."

== Significance ==
Various commentators, such as Oliver Gayner and Cathryn Hopkins of Olswang's and Thomas G. Heintzman of McCarthy Tétrault have suggested that parties to such cases may, as a result of this ruling, seek to introduce expert evidence on the precise degree of "commercial reasonableness" that a particular interpretation of a contract would imply.

== See also ==
- English contract law
