= The Diana Prosperity =

UK legal case

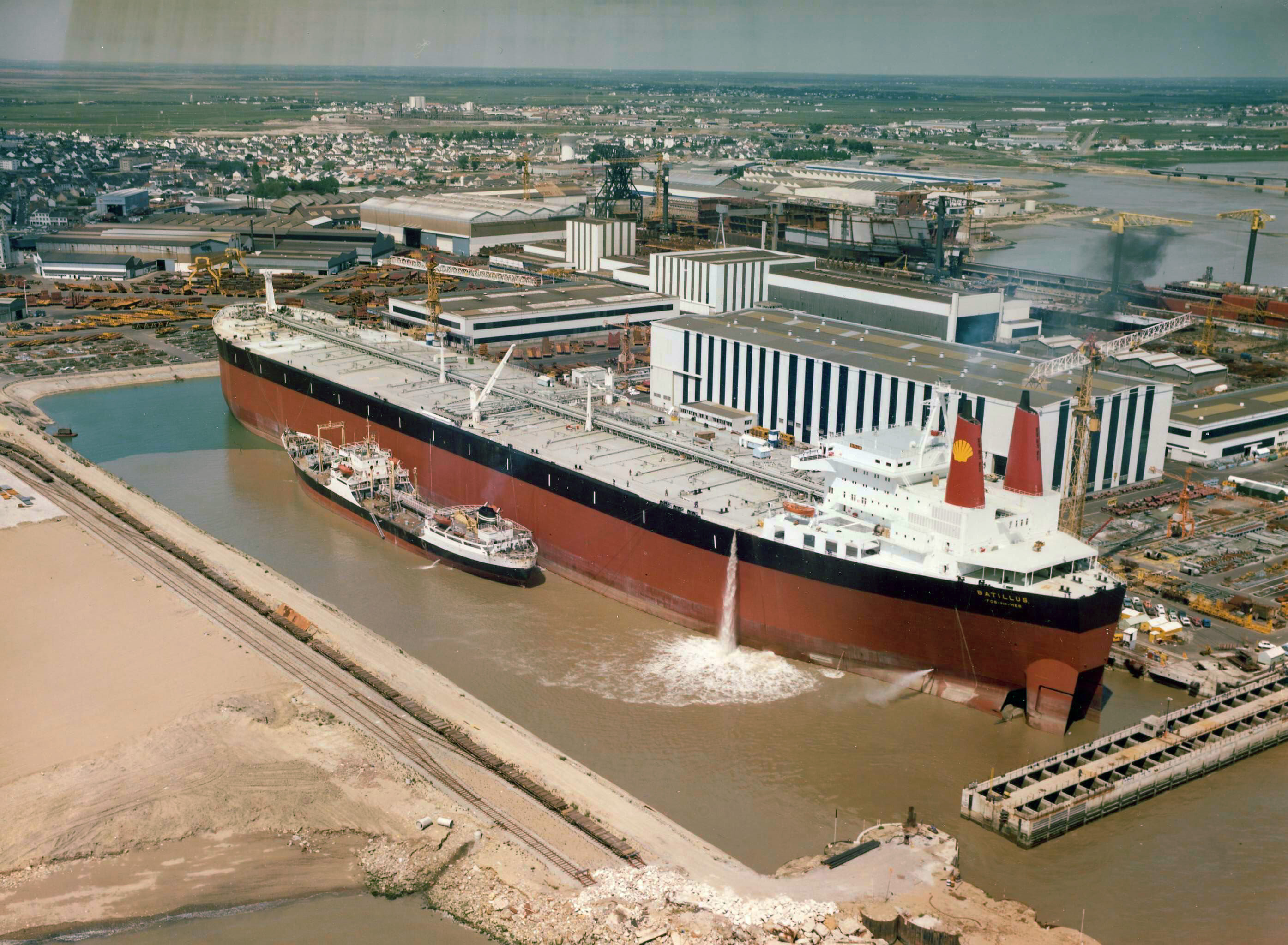
- Court: House of Lords
- Full case name: Reardon Smith Line Ltd v Yngvar Hansen-Tangen and Sanko SS & Co Ltd
- Citations: [1976] 1 WLR 989 [1976] 2 Lloyd's Rep 621

Case opinions
- Lord Wilberforce

Keywords
- Factual matrix, construction, termination

The Diana Prosperity or Reardon Smith Line Ltd v Yngvar Hansen-Tangen and Sanko SS & Co Ltd [1976] 1 WLR 989 is a landmark English contract law case. It heralded a new contextual approach to the interpretation of contracts.

== Facts ==
A charterparty described the ship to be chartered as "called Yard no 354 at Osaka". Osaka was the name of the yard responsible for building the ship, although the building was subcontracted to another yard, Oshima. The Osaka yard could not handle a tankship of that size. Both parties knew this. But the buyers, wanting to get out of the contract for another reason, argued that the ship did not correspond with the description under s 13 of the Sale of Goods Act 1979.

== Judgment ==
The House of Lords held that the words used did not fall under s 13, because they were merely labelling which vessel was involved. In the course of the decision, Lord Wilberforce stated that in construing a contract, the Court must,

place itself in thought in the same factual matrix as that in which the parties were.

The hull number and yard had no particular significance. The description needs to focus on the goods not excessively technical arguments.

== See also ==
- Investors Compensation Scheme Ltd v West Bromwich Building Society [1998] 1 All ER 98
