= RAF Hythe =

RAF Hythe
- Near Hythe, Hampshire in England
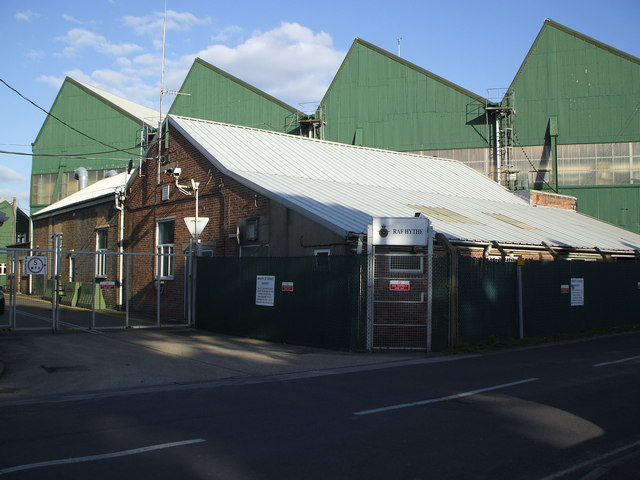
- Disused RAF building, March 2007

Site information
- Type: Royal Air Force station
- Owner: Ministry of Defence
- Operator: Royal Air Force; United States Army

Location
- Shown within Hampshire RAF Hythe (the United Kingdom)
- Coordinates: 50.8667°N 1.3924°W

Site history
- Built: 1924
- In use: 1925–2006

Royal Air Force Hythe or more simply RAF Hythe was a Royal Air Force station situated in Hythe, Hampshire, 10 miles (16 km) south of Southampton on the western side of Southampton Water.

Hangars were first erected here by May-Harden-May Ltd and acquired by Supermarine in 1925. The site was used for the final assembly of marine aircraft. The site again changed hands in 1937, being acquired by Imperial Airways (later BOAC) who used the site for flying boat maintenance until November 1950. Later, from 1967, the facilities were used by the US Field Army Support Brigade/Combat Equipment Battalion-Hythe, mainly for small boat repairs. At this time, the base became known as RAF Hythe.

The station, the last U.S. Army installation in the United Kingdom, closed on 30 September 2006 after the American Army left following a cost-cutting exercise. The site was acquired by the South East England Development Agency in October 2007, and has since been developed into the Hythe Marine Park, home to a number of maritime and marine production facilities.
