= JSC BTA Bank v Ablyazov =

JSC BTA Bank v Ablyazov (full name: JSC BTA Bank v Ablyazov & Ors) is a 2009 high-profile case before the High Court of England & Wales. JSC BTA Bank v Ablyazov and its related complaints, judgements and appeals involve JSC BTA Bank in Kazakhstan and its former chairman Mukhtar Ablyazov, whom the bank accuses of mismanaging and embezzling up to $8 billion to $12 billion of BTA capital.
