= Jackson v Murray =

- Court: UK Supreme Court
- Citation: [2015] UKSC 5

Jackson v Murray [2015] UKSC 5 is an English tort law case, concerning breach of duty.

== Facts ==
School minibus let two children off in winter in 2004, on A98 near Banff and Fraserburgh. One 13-year-old child crossed the road behind, and a car hit her, driving too fast to take account of the bus stopping - but 50 mph in 60 mph zone. He saw the bus but not thought about children. Severe injury. It was 40 minutes after sunset, lights fading.

The Judge held the child was contributorily negligent, 90%. The Court of Session Inner House reduced it to 70%.

== Judgment ==
The UK Supreme Court held that the claimant was contributorily negligent, but reduced damages by less. Lord Reed said that he would award 50% of the agreed damages to the pursuer.

41. ... As they pointed out, she was only 13 at the time, and a 13 year old will not necessarily have the same level of judgment and self-control as an adult.

Lady Hale and Lord Carnwath agreed.

Lord Hodge and Lord Wilson dissented.

== See also ==
- English tort law
