= Nzolameso v City of Westminster =

- Court: Supreme Court of the United Kingdom
- Full case name: Nzolameso v City of Westminster
- Argued: 17 March 2015
- Decided: 2 April 2015
- Neutral citation: [2015] UKSC 22

Case history
- Prior history: [2014] EWCA Civ 1383

Holding
- Appeal allowed, decision by the council quashed

Case opinions
- Majority: Lady Hale, Lords Clarke, Reed, Hughes and Toulson

Area of law
- Housing

Nzolameso v City of Westminster was a 2015 judgment by the Supreme Court of the United Kingdom that considered the way that local councils fulfil their duty to house the homeless. Section 208(1) of the Housing Act 1996 requires all local housing authorities to secure accommodation within their own district "so far as reasonably practicable".

== Facts ==
In November 2012, Titina Nzolameso, a single mother of five children was evicted from her home in Westminster. She applied to Westminster City Council under the relevant homelessness provisions and in January 2013 the council offered her a house in Bletchley (approximately 50 miles away). Ms. Nzolameso turned this offer down on the basis that she was settled in Westminster, had ongoing health concerns and did not want her children to have to change schools. Given that the offer of housing had been refused, Westminster City Council then served notice that their housing duty had come to an end. Ms. Nzolameso then sought to review the decision under s.202 of the Housing Act 1996.

== Judgment ==
=== Supreme Court ===
The decision by Westminster City Council that their housing duty had come to an end was quashed.

Handing down the leading judgment Lady Hale stated that because the authority had not explained and evidenced the reasons for their decision as required (Note: Para 32. "an obligation to give reasons for a decision is imposed so that the persons affected by the decision may know why they have won or lost and, in particular, may be able to judge whether the decision is valid and therefore unchallengeable or invalid and therefore open to challenge: see R v City of Westminster, Ex p Ermakov (1996) 28 HLR 819, at 826-827")

It follows that the authority cannot show that their offer of the property in Bletchley was sufficient to discharge their legal obligations towards the appellant under the 1996 Act. Moreover, their notification to the appellant that their duty towards her had come to an end was purportedly given in circumstances where she did not know, and had no means of knowing, what, if any, consideration had been given to providing accommodation in or nearer to the borough, apart from the general standard paragraph in the letter offering her the Bletchley accommodation the previous day.
