= Richard Wilberforce, Baron Wilberforce =

British judge (1907–2003)

The Right Honourable The Lord Wilberforce CMG OBE PC

Lord of Appeal in Ordinary
- In office 1964 – 10 March 1982
- Monarch: Elizabeth II
- Preceded by: The Lord Devlin
- Succeeded by: The Lord Brightman

Justice of the High Court
- In office 9 January 1961 – 1 October 1964
- Preceded by: Sir Harold Danckwerts
- Succeeded by: Sir Blanshard Stamp

Member of the House of Lords
- Lord Temporal
- Lord of Appeal in Ordinary; 1 October 1964 – 15 February 2003

Personal details
- Born: 11 March 1907 Jullundur, British India
- Died: 15 February 2003 (aged 95) Chelsea, London
- Children: 2
- Education: New College, Oxford

Richard Orme Wilberforce, Baron Wilberforce, CMG, OBE, PC (11 March 1907 – 15 February 2003) was a British judge. He was a Lord of Appeal in Ordinary from 1964 to 1982.

== Early life and career ==
Born in Jalandhar, India, Richard Wilberforce was the son of Samuel Wilberforce, ICS, later a judge of the Lahore High Court, and of Katherine Wilberforce, daughter of John Sheepshanks, Bishop of Norwich. His grandfather was Reginald Wilberforce, who helped restore British order in Delhi, after the Indian Rebellion of 1857. His great-grandfather was Samuel Wilberforce, Bishop of Winchester, and his great-great-grandfather was the abolitionist William Wilberforce, a connection which had much influence upon him.

Wilberforce spent the first seven years of his life in India, before being sent to England in 1914 on the outbreak of the First World War. He attended five preparatory schools, the last being Sandroyd School. From Sandroyd he went to Winchester College in 1920 where Monty Rendall, the headmaster, convinced him to drop Mathematics, in which he excelled, in favour of Classics, to broaden his career options. Wilberforce excelled in his new subject, winning all four top college prizes.

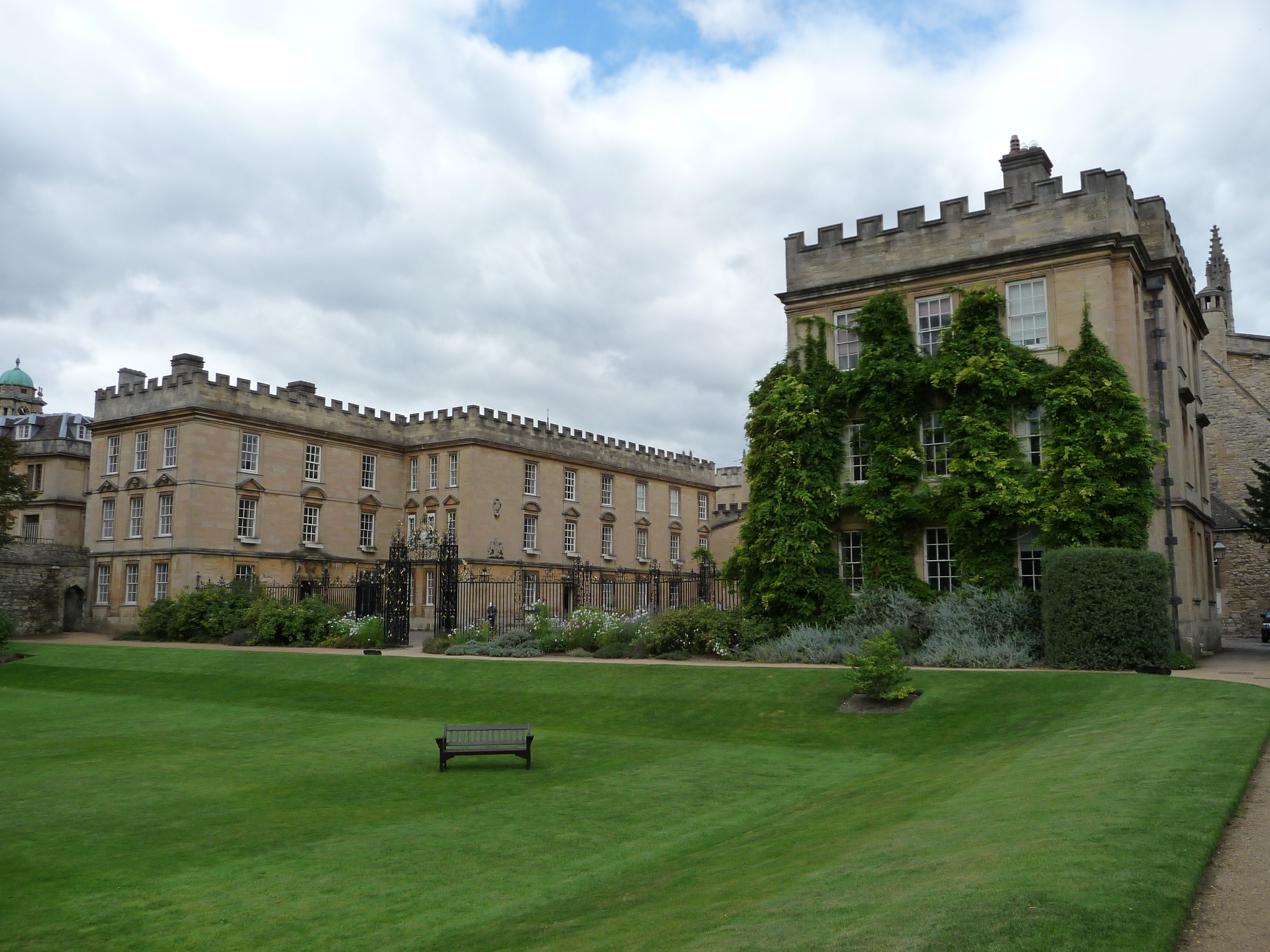
New College, Oxford

From Winchester, Wilberforce entered New College, Oxford, where he was a scholar, obtaining First Class Honours in both Classical Moderations (1928) and Literae humaniores (1930). He won the Craven, Hertford and Ireland scholarships in Classics, as well as the Eldon Law Scholarship. In 1932, on his third attempt, Wilberforce was elected a prize fellow of All Souls College; the two other successful candidates that year were Isaiah Berlin and Patrick Reilly. Wilberforce remained a fellow of the college until his death seventy years later.

Moving to London, Wilberforce was called to the Bar by the Middle Temple in 1932. He was the pupil of the renowned Chancery junior Wilfrid Hunt; a fellow pupil was H. L. A. Hart. Wilberforce joined the chambers of Andrew Clark (today called Wilberforce Chambers) and practised at the Chancery Bar but, lacking family connections, his earnings were meagre, although they began to increase toward the end of the decade.

=== Wartime service ===
Fearing that war was inevitable, Wilberforce joined the Army reserves after the Munich Agreement in 1938. At the outbreak of the Second World War in 1939, Wilberforce volunteered for service in the British Army, though he was advised against it, and was commissioned into the Royal Artillery. In 1940 he was aide-de-camp to Major-General Bernard Paget, who led the British expeditionary force during the Norwegian Campaign.

After Norway, Wilberforce held various staff appointments before being posted to the War Office where, as a lieutenant colonel, he was put in charge of Army entertainments. In 1944 he was attached to the Supreme Headquarters Allied Expeditionary Force. In 1945 he drafted the German Instrument of Surrender which Field Marshal Wilhelm Keitel and others signed in Berlin on 8 May.

After the German surrender, Wilberforce, by then a brigadier, headed the British legal section of the Allied Control Council. In 1946–7 he returned to London to serve as Under-Secretary at the Control Office for Germany and Austria. For his wartime service, Wilberforce was appointed an OBE and received the American Bronze Star. He retained the rank of honorary brigadier.

While in Berlin, Wilberforce met Yvette Marie Lenoan, a captain in the French Army and the daughter of Roger Lenoan, a judge of the Cour de Cassation posted to Berlin. They married in 1947.

=== Return to the Bar ===
Wilberforce returned to the Bar in 1947 when the Control Office for Germany and Austria was abolished. His old chambers had disappeared, forcing him to find new accommodation. His practice was at first very small, and he considered leaving the Bar. He acted for Prince Ernest Augustus of Hanover to be recognized as a British subject under the Sophia Naturalization Act 1705. He became a member of the Bar Council in 1951 and was appointed a Queen's Counsel in 1954.

He participated in several Foreign Office cases, including Corfu Channel case and the Norwegian Fisheries case in the International Court of Justice. He was also appointed as the British legal member of the International Civil Aviation Organization. He was appointed a Companion of the Order of St Michael and St George for services in relation to the Warsaw Convention in 1956.

In the 1950 election, he stood for Kingston upon Hull Central as the Conservative candidate, in the city formerly represented by his ancestor William Wilberforce, but lost to the incumbent Labour MP Mark Hewitson.

== Judicial career ==
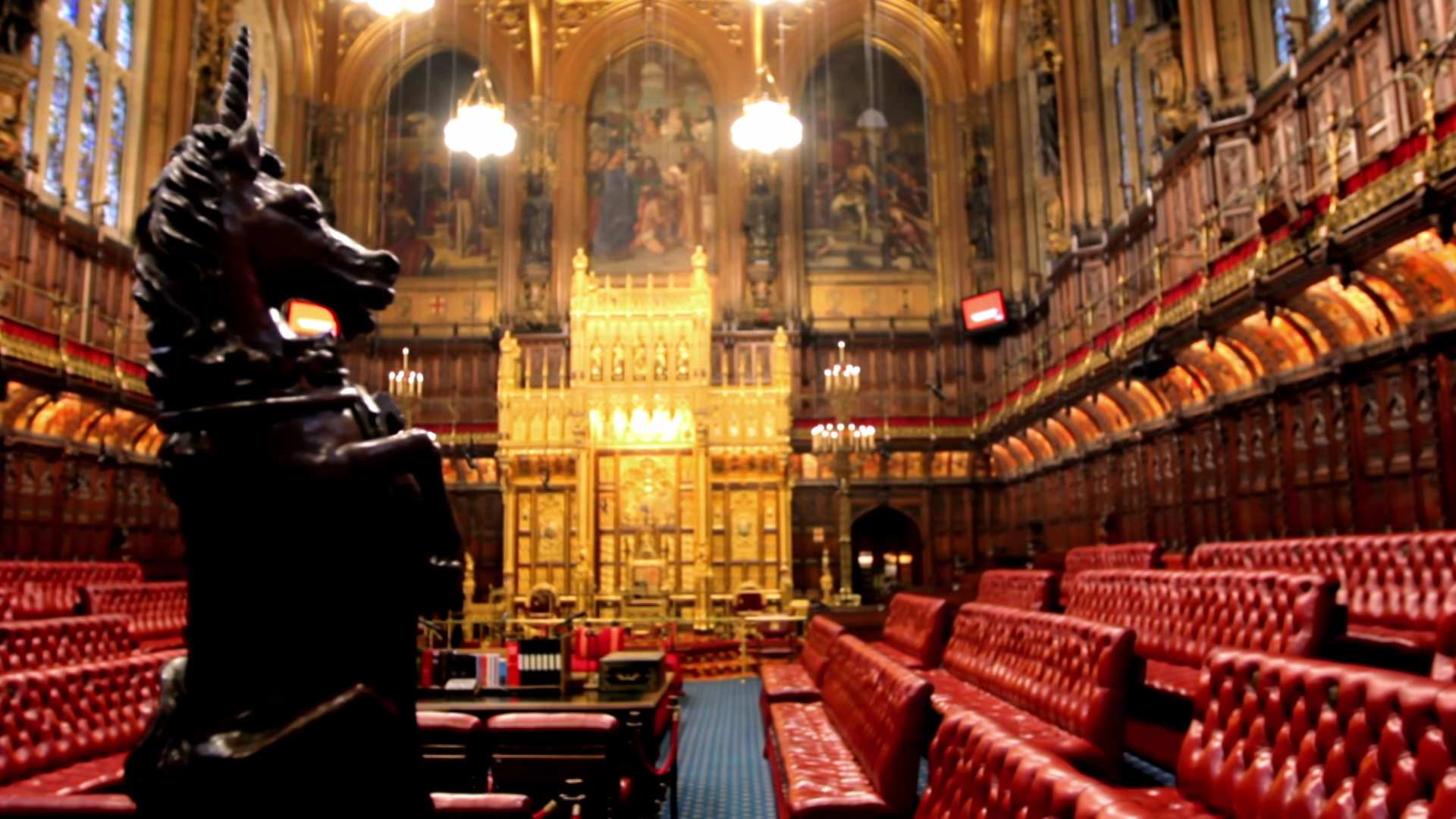
The House of Lords, where Lord Wilberforce presided as Law Lord.

Wilberforce was appointed to the High Court in 1961 and assigned to the Chancery Division, receiving the customary knighthood. On 1 October 1964, after only three years' service, he was elevated to the House of Lords as a Lord of Appeal in Ordinary, and was made a life peer as Baron Wilberforce, of the City and County of Kingston-upon-Hull; he was also sworn of the Privy Council. He is the only English judge in recent times to have been appointed to the House of Lords directly from the High Court, without having prior served in the Court of Appeal.

Wilberforce served as a Law Lord for 18 years, during which he heard 465 appeals, often giving the leading judgment. He was the Senior Law Lord from 1975 until his retirement in 1982. His decisions were highly regarded and covered multiple areas of the law.

He was president of the Anti-Slavery Society from 1971.

In the early 1970s he chaired two inquiries. The first was into power workers' pay in 1971, and found in the workers' favour. The second was set up during the miners' strike of 1972; owing to Wilberforce's exceptional effort, it was reported within a week, and recommended pay increases of between £4.50 and £6 to the miners.

Wilberforce was Chancellor of the University of Hull between 1978 and 1994, High Steward of the University of Oxford from 1967 to 1990, Visitor of Wolfson College from 1974 to 1990 and Visitor of Linacre College from 1983 to 1990.

== Famous judgments ==
Wilberforce gave many important and prescient judgments, including in the following cases:

=== High Court ===
- Eastham v Newcastle United FC [1964] Ch 413
- Boardman v Phipps [1964] 1 WLR 993 — duty of loyalty and conflict of interest

=== House of Lords and Privy Council ===
- National Provincial Bank Ltd v Ainsworth [1965] AC 1175
- Barclays Bank Ltd v Quistclose Investments Ltd [1970] AC 567 – The original consolidation of the 'Quistclose' trust
- Boys v Chaplin [1971] AC 356 — conflict of laws
- McPhail v Doulton [1971] AC 424 – certainty of objects in trusts
- Prenn v Simmonds [1971] 1 WLR 1381 – admissibility of extrinsic evidence in interpretation of contractual terms
- British Railways Board v Herrington [1972] AC 877 – common law occupier's liability
- Ebrahimi v Westbourne Galleries Ltd [1973] AC 360
- Howard Smith Ltd v Ampol Petroleum Ltd [1974] AC 821
- DPP for Northern Ireland v Lynch [1975] AC 653 — defence of duress
- The Diana Prosperity [1976] 1 WLR 989 — interpretation of contracts
- Anns v Merton London Borough Council [1978] AC 728
- Johnson v Agnew [1979] 1 All ER 883 — assessment of damages
- Photo Production Ltd v Securicor Transport Ltd [1980] AC 827 – doctrine of 'fundamental breach' and exclusion clauses
- Midland Bank Trust Co Ltd v Green (No 1) [1980] UKHL 7 (11 December 1980)
- College of Nursing of the United Kingdom v Department of Health and Social Security (1981)
- Williams & Glyn's Bank v Boland [1981] AC 487 — overriding interest
- Ramsay v IRC [1982] AC 300 — the Ramsay principle
- MPC v Caldwell [1982] AC 341 – test of recklessness
- Brinkibon Ltd v Stahag Stahl und Stahlwarenhandelsgesellschaft mbH [1983] 2 AC 34 – contract formation by telex
- McLoughlin v O'Brian [1983] 1 AC 410 — recovery of damages from nervous shock
- Frazer v Walker and Radomski
- R v Inland Revenue Commissioners, ex parte National Federation of Self-Employed & Small Business Ltd

== Publications ==
- with Alan Campbell and Neil Elles, The Law of Restrictive Practices and Monopolies (2nd edn London, Sweet and Maxwell 1966) LCCN 66-70116
- Law and economics: Being the presidential address of the Rt. Hon. Lord Wilberforce (Holdsworth Club 1966)
- ' ' Reflections on my Life' ' (Private publication, edited an published by his son Sam Wilberforce 2003)

== Arms ==
Coat of arms of Richard Wilberforce, Baron Wilberforce

Escutcheon
Argent an eagle displayed Sable armed Gules.
