= Interpreting contracts in English law =

Interpreting contracts in English law is an area of English contract law, which concerns how the courts decide what an agreement means. It is settled law that the process is based on the objective view of a reasonable person, given the context in which the contracting parties made their agreement. This approach marks a break with previous a more rigid modes of interpretation before the 1970s, where courts paid closer attention to the formal expression of the parties' intentions and took more of a literal view of what they had said.

The process of interpretation was often skewed by courts who tried to construe contracts in a way that was fair. Before the Unfair Contract Terms Act 1977, the courts had not developed a jurisdiction to strike down unfair terms. When faced with harsh exclusion clauses they would often "interpret their way out" of the plain meaning of the clause through a process of strict construction against the party relying on a clause (in Latin, contra proferentem). This would often run contrary to the common sense meaning of a contractual document, and embodied a strained approach.

== Interpretation ==
=== Objectivity ===
For some time it had been orthodox to take an objective view of interpretation, best demonstrated by Smith v Hughes. Where Mr Smith thought, after testing a sample, he was buying old oats but in fact was buying green oats, he was not able to assert that he was unbound by his agreement. Blackburn J said:

If, whatever a man's real intention may be, he so conducts himself that a reasonable man would believe that he was assenting to the terms proposed by the other party, and that other party upon that belief enters into the contract with him, the man thus conducting himself would be equally bound as if he had intended to agree to the other party’s terms.

A remarkable example of the objective approach to interpreting a contract is found in Thake v Maurice. A couple were assured by a private doctor that Mr Thake's vasectomy would work. They were not explicitly informed there was a small risk of it not working. They had a healthy child. They sued Dr Maurice (and his clinic) for damages to pay for bringing up the child, arguing that his failure to properly perform the operation was a breach of contract which had resulted in great financial burden for them. But the Court of Appeal held that there was no entitlement to damages because a reasonable person knows that there is inherent risk in medical operations, and the chance it could go wrong (now compare Chester v Afshar in tort law). A reasonable person knows that people providing services contract to provide the service, but do not necessarily guarantee the outcome of the service will be fool proof.

- Proforce Recruit Ltd v The Rugby Group Ltd [2006] EWCA Civ 69
- Chartbrook Ltd v Persimmon Homes Ltd [2008] EWCA Civ 183
- Attorney General of Belize v Belize Telecom Ltd [2009] UKPC 11

=== Purpose and context ===
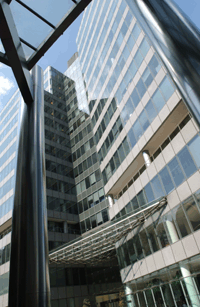
ICS Ltd v West Bromwich BS is the leading case on the "contextual" approach to interpretation. It revolved around what is now the FSA's Financial Services Compensation Scheme

The move to a contextual, or purposive approach to construing contracts is a recent feature of English contract law. For instance in 1911, in Lovell & Christmas Ltd v Wall Lord Cozens-Hardy MR stated,

it is the duty of the court… to construe the document according to the ordinary grammatical meaning of the words used therein.

Notably the move away from a literal approach came only after the courts pronounced that in interpreting statutes, they had moved from a literal to a purposive approach (see Pepper v Hart). Now, the leading statement of interpreting contracts is found in Lord Hoffmann's decision in Investors Compensation Scheme Ltd v West Bromwich Building Society. He referred to changes in approach led by Lord Wilberforce in cases such as Rearden Smith Lines Ltd v Hansen Tangan and said the courts should follow five general principles. When interpreting contracts courts ask,

- what the document conveys to a reasonable person
- with regard to all relevant background circumstances, or the "matrix of fact"
- except prior negotiations
- that the meaning of words is not their literal, dictionary meaning, but one that would be understood from the context
- that the meaning construed should not run contrary to a common sense viewpoint.

In ICS Ltd v West Bromwich BS itself, a group of investors had been given negligent advice by various building societies (including West Bromwich BS), financial advisers and solicitors, and so had potential claims for breach of statutory duty. Under the government's Investors Compensation Scheme, the investor could simply get money from the Scheme directly, and the Scheme would carry through the expense of litigation on their behalf. However, in the contract to assign the claims, it said there was an exclusion for,

"Any claim (whether sounding in rescission for undue influence or otherwise)"

Taking a literal approach, this could mean - and the building societies were trying to argue - that any claim to rescind a contract (i.e. have it made void) would not be assigned by investors to the Scheme, whether it was for rescission based on a claim in undue influence, or any other claim. The building societies were trying to argue this, because if there was no valid assignment, then ICS would not be empowered to sue them. ICS Ltd was arguing that in fact (probably through unclear drafting) the clause was really intended to mean that claims for rescission based on undue influence would not be assigned. But others would. Lord Hoffmann and the House of Lords unanimously accepted this interpretation, since it was the correct one given the context in which the contract was signed.

- Staffordshire Area Health Authority v South Staffordshire Waterworks Co [1978] 3 All ER 769, per Lord Denning MR
- Rainy Sky v Kookmin Bank [2011] UKSC 50

==== Negotiations? ====
One point of controversy was Lord Hoffmann's acceptance that the courts would not look at negotiations prior to the contract as an aid to interpretation. Professor G McMeel has argued that, "The best way forward is for the matter to be one of weight rather than admissibility." In other words, that evidence of negotiations may not necessarily weigh very heavily in the face of contradictory evidence in a contract itself, but it should not be barred entirely. Declarations of subjective intent, prior negotiations and subsequent conduct should not be ruled out as irrelevant where they could be a valuable aid to interpretation. Lord Nicholls has also been supportive of this view, and has argued that in fact evidence of prior negotiations and conduct subsequent to the conclusion of a contract are already admissible for cases on rectification (e.g. The Karen Oltman [1976] 2 Lloyd’s Rep 708). He argues the courts are well accustomed to determining what weight should be place on admissible evidence. Finally, the absolute bar on admissibility on prior negotiations also stands at odds with art 5-102(a), Principles of European Contract Law. This document, which draws on principles found across most European Union member states that preliminary negotiations are relevant to interpretation. The exclusion may also be seen to be at odds with the leading case on statutory interpretation, Pepper v Hart, in which the House of Lords held that it would have recourse to authoritative statements of purpose by ministers or promoters of Bills in Hansard when ascertaining the meaning of a statute.

- Chartbrook Ltd v Persimmon Homes Ltd [2009] UKHL 38

=== Mistake and rectification ===
The general rule in English law is that if one party to the contract is mistaken about the terms of the contract, this is not an excuse to fail to perform, the classic case being Smith v Hughes. There has been debate about whether at any point courts do in fact have regard to the subjective intentions of the parties. In Scriven Bros & Co v Hindley & Co Scriven Bros made a bid at an auction (the auctioneer was trading as Hindley & Co) for bales of hemp and tow. The auction catalogue suggested that one of the batches contained both hemp and tow. But it only contained tow. When the auctioneer tried to enforce the high bid by Scriven Bros, Lawrence J held he could not, because the sale had been procured by the auctioneer's own negligence. Guenter Treitel has argued that the case is best explained on the basis that the court will have regard to the subjective intentions of the parties - that in fact hemp and tow was being contracted for. But Ewan McKendrick argues that this case is still explicable through taking an objective approach to the parties expressed wishes: a reasonable person in Hindley's position would not have thought there was a contract with someone misled by their negligently prepared auction catalogue.

A mistake about the contract's terms will also entitle a party to the contract to escape when the other side may have unfairly "snapped up" an offer. In Hartog v Colin & Shields Colin & Shields mistakenly advertised Argentine hare skins for 10d per pound, instead of per piece (i.e. they had made them much cheaper). In the trade, such skins were always sold by the piece. So when a Belgian called Hartog ordered the skins, Singleton J held that Colin & Shields did not need to deliver. A reasonable person could not have believed the price was not mistaken.

=== Rectification ===
It may however be that a contractual document has failed to adequately reflect the intentions of the parties, in which case they can ask the court to "rectify" the agreement (i.e. pretend the words written down were different and give an order accordingly). Asking a court to rectify a document does not mean asking for the contract to be changed. It just asks for the recording of the document to be changed. Rectification is an equitable discretionary remedy, and therefore unavailable to claimants who delay excessively and it has no effect against a bona fide purchaser for value without notice. There is a fine line between interpretation and rectification, since evidence assisting in interpretation is also evidence which can give rise to rectification. Claimants can ask for both.

But the order for rectification is rare. The reason for this is the necessity of promoting certainty. In The Olympic Pride Mustill LJ remarked,

The Court is reluctant to allow a party of full capacity who has signed a document with opportunity of inspection, to say afterwards that it is not what he meant. Otherwise, certainty and ready enforceability would be hindered by constant attempts to cloud the issue by reference to pre-contractual negotiations. These considerations apply with particular force in the field of commerce, where certainty is so important. Various expressions have been employed in the reported cases to describe the standard of proof required of the person who seeks rectification. Counsel in the present case were agreed that the standard can adequately be stated by saying that the Court must be "sure" of the mistake, and of the existence of a prior agreement or common intention before granting the remedy.

Generally, a unilateral mistake by itself is not enough to win an order. An exception, however, is made where it is proven beyond reasonable doubt that one party is aware of the other's mistake and idly stands by as the wrong details are recorded. The conduct must be unconscionable, perhaps by diverting one's attention with false and misleading leading statements, but not amounting to a mistake caused by misrepresentation. So for instance, in George Wimpey UK (Ltd) v VI Construction Ltd a land buyer misunderstood the formula for assessing extra payments if the sale price of flats exceeded a particular figure. But it was not shown that any dishonesty was involved on the part of the seller, and so no rectification was granted.

- Frederick E Rose (London) Ltd v William H Pim Junior & Co Ltd [1953] 2 QB 450
- Joscelyne v Nissen [1970] 2 QB 86, a father agreed with his daughter that she would buy his business and in return pay his home gas, electricity and coal bills. The contract did not express this ‘continuing common intention’. Russell, Sachs and Phillimore LJJ held that there could be rectification, because there was ‘convincing proof’ (98) of the intention.

== Exclusion clauses ==
In order to tackle the unfairness that can result from the use of exclusion clauses, courts have a variety of tools at their disposal. They can,

1. choose to not incorporate a term, e.g. Thornton v Shoe Lane Parking Ltd
2. interpret a clause restrictively, e.g. Hollier v Rambler Motors Ltd
3. restrict its effect through construction with an implied term, e.g. Johnstone v Bloomsbury Health Authority
4. apply the Unfair Contract Terms Act 1977
5. apply the Unfair Terms in Consumer Contracts Regulations 1999

But before 1977, legislation to directly regulate unfair terms did not exist, and jurisprudence on implied terms was underdeveloped. Even now, with one notable exception, the courts have not accepted that they have any inherent jurisdiction to control unfair terms. It is only under legislation that authority appears to exist. This meant that modes of interpretation were much more important to control unfair terms. In Gillespie Bros v Roy Bowles Ltd Lord Denning remarked,

judges have… time after time, sanctioned a departure from the ordinary meaning. They have done it under the guise of ‘construing’ the clause. They assume that the party cannot have intended anything so unreasonable. So they construe the clause ‘strictly’. They cut down the ordinary meaning of the words and reduce them to reasonable proportions. They use all their skill and art to that end.

But apart from Lord Denning, courts are still unwilling to reserve for themselves an explicit role to regulate contractual terms that could result in manifest unfairness. They have left the job to Parliament.

=== Contra proferentem ===
Shylock: My deeds upon my head! I crave the law, The penalty and forfeit of my bond...

Portia: ... prepare thee to cut off the flesh. Shed thou no blood; nor cut thou less nor more, But just a pound of flesh: if thou tak’st more, Or less, than a just pound, be it but so much As makes it light or heavy in the substance, Or the division of the twentieth part Of one poor scruple; nay, if the scale do turn But in the estimation of a hair, Thou diest, and all thy goods are confiscate.

— W Shakespeare, The Merchant of Venice, Act IV, scene i

Contra proferentem means an exclusion clause is interpreted strictly against the party seeking to rely on it, so any ambiguity is resolved against them. As a mode of interpretation it is used particularly against exclusion clauses for negligence on the basis that the courts regard it as inherently unlikely that one party will agree to allow the other contracting party to exclude liability for his own negligence. However, since the enactment of UCTA 1977, the extent to which courts have employed the contra proferentem rule has waned. There has not been such a need to "interpret the contract out" of unfairness.

- Wallis, Son and Wells v Pratt and Haynes [1911] AC 394

A seed sale contract clause said the sellers gave ‘no warranty express or implied’ as to the seeds’ description. The seeds did not match the description. Held, that the clause only applied to a warranty, and the description was actually a condition of the contract.

- Andrews Bros (Bournemouth) Ltd v Singer and Co Ltd [1934] 1 KB 17

In a contract for ‘new Singer cars’ the clause was ‘all conditions, warranties and liabilities implied by statute, common law or otherwise are excluded.’ One car delivered was used. Greer LJ noted they were probably trying to avoid Wallis but the defendants had forgotten about express terms. Here an express term was broken.

- BCCI SA v Ali [2001] UKHL 8, Lord Hoffmann [60] (dissenting), the doctrine ‘is a desperate remedy, to be invoked only if it is necessary to remedy a widespread injunstice.’ So contra proferentum should only operate where there is real ambiguity.
- Alderslade v Hendon Laundry Ltd [1945] KB 189

Ten large handkerchiefs were lost by the laundry. ‘The maximum amount allowed for lost or damaged articles is twenty times the charge made for laundering.’ That was 11s 5d. The cost of the handkerchiefs was £5. Lord Greene MR held the limitation clause did apply, because although negligence was not mentioned, the defendants could only have been liable for the handkerchiefs if they had been negligent.

- Canada Steamship Lines Ltd v The King [1952] AC 192

Clause 8 said the Crown would keep a freight shed in repair, where Canada Steamship’s goods were being stored. This was at St. Gabriel Basin, on a wharf of the inner harbour of Montreal. Unfortunately, while trying to keep the shed in repair with an oxy-acetylene torch, an employee started a fire and burned down the shed. He should have used a hand drill because sparks flew and lit some cotton bales. $533,584 of goods were destroyed, $40,714 belonging to Canada Steamship. Clause 7 said ‘the lessee shall not have any claim… for… damage… to… goods… being… in the said shed.’ Clause 17 said “the lessee shall at all times indemnify ... the lessor from and against all claims ... by whomsoever made ... in any manner based upon, occasioned by or attributable to the execution of these presents, or any action taken or things done ... by virtue hereof, or the exercise in any manner of rights arising hereunder.” Lord Morton of Henryton for the Privy Council said that clause 7 did not exclude negligence liability in clear enough terms and clause 17 was ambiguous and would be construed against the Crown. The Crown could realistically be said to have been strictly liable for damage to the goods (e.g. by breach of obligation to keep the shed in repair) and were therefore negligence should not be covered. He set out these principles. (1) if a clause expressly excludes liability for negligence (or an appropriate synonym ) then effect is given to that. If not, (2) ask whether the words are wide enough to exclude negligence and if there is doubt that is resolved against the one relying on the clause. If that is satisfied then (3) ask whether the clause could cover some alternative liability other than for negligence, and if it can it covers that.

- Hollier v Rambler Motors (AMC) Ltd [1972] 1 All ER 399
- The Raphael [1982] 2 Lloyd’s Rep 42, the above three rules are merely aids to identify the parties’ intentions. You cannot pick ‘fanciful or remote’ alternatives to negligence. Stephenson LJ said if the alternative was sufficiently realistic for the parties to intend the clause to apply that was enough. Lord Donaldson MR and May LJ said the question was ultimately one of construction.
- Dorset CC v Southern Felt Roofing Ltd (1989) 48 Build LR 96, an example of passing the second rule only to fall foul of the third. McKendrick, 230, says the rules put conflicting demands on draftsmen because (2) requires a widely drafted clause but (3) says the wider it is drafted the more likely it will exclude something other than negligence.
- Schenker & Co (Aust) Pty Ltd v Malpas Equipment and Services Pty Ltd [1990] VR 834, 846, McGarvie J said the rules were contrary to ordinary rules of construction from Darlington Futures.
- EE Caledonia Ltd v Orbit Valve Co Europe [1993] 4 All ER 165, 173, Hobhouse J asserted the rules should be applied because draftspeople expect courts to follow established principles, and they can always change their drafting.
- These rules on interpretation are like exclusion clauses themselves. The courts send out one message with general principles of construction, and then surreptitiously add another. Fighting fire with fire just fans the flames of confusion. It would be preferable to be forthright and say unreasonable clauses will be struck down, while applying ordinary principles of construction.
- Rules also endorsed in The Fiona [1994] 2 Lloyd’s Rep 506 and Shell Chemicals UK Ltd v P&O Roadtanks Ltd [1995] 1 Lloyd’s Rep 297, 301.
- McKendrick, 231, suggests that the rules frustrate the intention of parties, especially when they want a clause to cover negligence and something else (e.g. late delivery) and should not be applied, or ‘quietly laid to rest’ (233).
- Ailsa Craig Fishing Co Ltd v Malvern Fishing Co Ltd [1983] 1 WLR 964: Securicor was watching the Aberdeen fishing fleet's boats in harbour. Clause 2(f) of the contract limited liability to £1000 ‘in respect of any one claim arising from any duty assumed by the company’ and to £10,000 ‘in respect of all and any incidents arising during any consecutive period of twelve months’. A vessel belonging to Ailsa Craig Fishing (ACF) was sunk on New Year’s Eve, 1971, after another boat crashed into it. The judge held Securicor’s negligence caused that and awarded £55,000 in damages. The Court of Appeal reduced it to £1000. Lord Wilberforce held the limitation clause did apply. It is ‘a question of construction of that clause in the context of the contract as a whole.’ Exclusions for negligence are contra proferentum, but a strained construction is no good, the ‘relevant words must be given, if possible, their natural, plain meaning.’

‘Clauses of limitation are not regarded by the courts with the same hostility as clauses of exclusion: this is because they must be related to other contractual terms, in particular to the risks to which the defending party may be exposed, the remuneration which he receives, and possibly also the opportunity of the other party to insure.’ Lord Fraser, the Canada Steamship ‘principles are not applicable in their full rigour when considering the effect of clauses merely limiting liability.’ They are read contra proferentum and must be clear, but that is it. The purpose of the rules for excluding liability is ‘the inherent improbability that the other party… intended to release the proferens from a liability that would otherwise fall upon him. But there is no such high degree of improbability’ for limitations.

- Darlington Futures Ltd v Delco Australia Pty Ltd (1987) 61 ALJR 76, refused to differentiate between exclusions and limitations; but it was affirmed by Lord Bridge in George Mitchell Ltd v Finney Lock Seeds Ltd
- HIH Casualty and General Insurance Ltd v Chase Manhattan Bank [2003] UKHL 6: Chase Manhattan was acted as leader of a loan syndicate funding five films. An insurance contract between HIH and Chase Manhattan had a ‘truth of statement’ clause. But there was a general exclusion for misrepresentation. It was held not to exclude liability for fraudulent misrepresentation or non-disclosure. But obiter, negligent misrepresentation and non-disclosure were excluded effectively (even though Canada would say it is not, given liability for innocent misrepresentation and non-disclosure was also a possibility).

The paramount task of the court is to give effect to the parties’ intentions, Lord Bingham [6], Lord Hoffmann [61-3], Lord Hobhouse [95] and Lord Scott [116]. But the rules will be retained where they give effect to the parties’ intentions. Lord Bingham [11], ‘There can be no doubting the general authority of [Lord Morton’s principles], which have been applied in many cases, and the approach indicated is sound. The courts should not ordinarily infer that a contracting party has given up rights which the law confers upon him to an extent greater than the contract terms indicate he has chosen to do.’

=== Fundamental breach ===
The courts tried to control and strike down very extreme exclusion clauses, those which excluded liability for very serious breaches of contract. The simple rule now, is that it is a matter of construction whether an exclusion clause covers a fundamental breach which occurred. Lord Denning wanted a ‘rule of law’ approach so that liability for some fundamental breaches of contract could never be excluded no matter how widely the clause was drafted. But Suisse Atlantique Societe d’Armament Maritime SA v NV Rotterdamsche Kolen Centrale [1967] 1 AC 361 held that the preferable ‘rule of construction’ approach was to interpret the clause against the party relying on it. In Harbutt's Plasticine Ltd v Wayne Tank Pump Co Ltd [1970] 1 QB 477, Lord Denning MR seized on the judgments ambiguities and resurrected his own rule. But that was stopped at last in…

- Photo Production Ltd v Securicor Transport Ltd [1980] AC 827
- Clauses which exempt someone from a serious breach, such as for a term going to the contract’s root (Karsales (Harrow) Ltd v Wallis [1956] 1 WLR 936) or a deliberate refusal to perform (Sze Hai Tong Bank Ltd v Rambler Cycle Co Ltd [1959] AC 576) must be very expressly excluded.
- Curtis v Chemical Cleaning and Dyeing Co Ltd [1951] 1 KB 805, a party cannot rely on an exclusion clause if he has misrepresented its effect.
- Couchman v Hill [1947] KB 554, a written exclusion clause can be overridden by express and inconsistent undertakings at the time of the contract.

There is no general power to strike down unreasonable exclusion clauses.

== Exclusion of remedies ==
Any language purporting to exclude a remedy for breach of contract available under common law or as an extra-contractual remedy is subject to a requirement for clear words to this effect. Lord Diplock established authority for this requirement in the case of Gilbert-Ash (Northern) Ltd. v Modern Engineering (Bristol) Ltd. in 1974:

In construing such a contract one starts with the presumption that neither party intends to abandon any remedies for its breach arising by operation of law, and clear express words must be used in order to rebut this presumption.

== See also ==
- Contractual terms in English law
- Unfair terms in English law
- English contract law
- Law Commission, Unfair Terms in Contracts (Report No. 292, 2005) produced an Unfair Contract Terms Bill
