= George Mitchell (Chesterhall) Ltd v Finney Lock Seeds Ltd =

1983 British court case

George Mitchell Ltd v Finney Lock Seeds Ltd
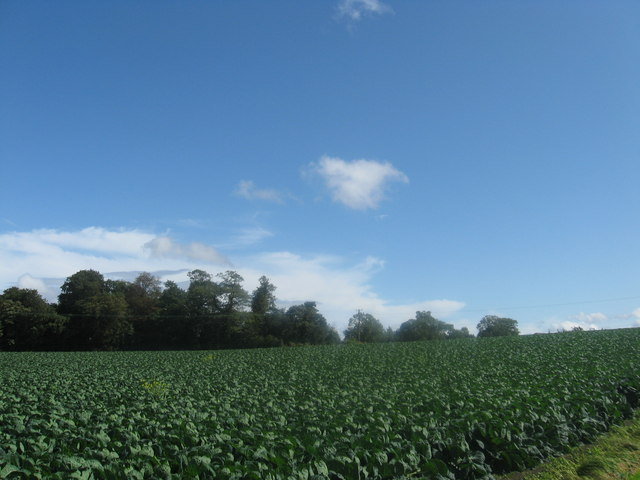
- Cabbage field at Chesterhall, East Lothian
- Court: House of Lords
- Full case name: George Mitchell (Chesterhall) Ltd v Finney Lock Seeds Ltd
- Decided: 30 June 1983
- Citation: [1983] 2 AC 803

Case history
- Prior actions: [1981] 1 Lloyd's Rep 476; [1982] EWCA Civ 5, [1983] QB 284

Case opinions
- Lord Bridge and Lord Diplock

Keywords
- Unfair terms, interpretation, exclusion clauses

George Mitchell (Chesterhall) Ltd v Finney Lock Seeds Ltd is a case concerning the sale of goods and exclusion clauses. It was decided under the Unfair Contract Terms Act 1977 and the Sale of Goods Act 1979.

== Facts ==
Finney Lock Seeds Ltd agreed to supply George Mitchell (Chesterhall) Ltd with 30 lb of Dutch winter cabbage seed for £201.60. An invoice sent with the delivery was considered part of the contract and limited liability to replacing "any seeds or plants sold" if defective (clause 1) and excluding all liability for loss or damage or consequential loss or damage from use of the seed (clause 2). 63 acres (250,000 m^{2}) of crops failed, and £61,513 was claimed for loss of production.

The two main issues in the case were whether the limitation clause should be interpreted to cover the seeds actually sold, given that the seeds were wholly defective and so did not do a seed's job at all and whether, under the Unfair Contract Terms Act 1977, s 2(2) the limitation was reasonable (s 11).

== Judgments ==
=== High Court ===
Judge Parker held that the goods sold were not "seeds" at all and he did not look at the statute. On the basis that clause 1 said "any seeds or plants sold", he held that what was sold could not be considered seeds (because they simply did not work) and therefore the exclusion in clause 2, which was attached to what was sold in clause 1, had no effect.

=== Court of Appeal ===
The majority, Lord Justices Oliver and Kerr, held that the limitation clause did not apply because, like Judge Parker, they held that what was sold was not seed. However, Master of the Rolls Lord Denning dissented from the majority's reasoning and argued the clause applied to limit liability for the seeds sold even if the seeds were defective. Ultimately, all agreed that the clause was invalid under the Supply of Goods (Implied Terms) Act 1973 (see now s 55 Sale of Goods Act 1979 and Unfair Contract Terms Act 1977) because it was unreasonable.

In a memorable passage and his last-ever judgment, Lord Denning MR outlined the problem of the case in this way.

The heyday of freedom of contract

None of you nowadays will remember the trouble we had – when I was called to the Bar – with exemption clauses. They were printed in small print on the back of tickets and order forms and invoices. They were contained in catalogues or timetables. They were held to be binding on any person who took them without objection. No one ever did object. He never read them or knew what was in them. No matter how unreasonable they were, he was bound. All this was done in the name of "freedom of contract." But the freedom was all on the side of the big concern which had the use of the printing press. No freedom for the little man who took the ticket or order form or invoice. The big concern said, "Take it or leave it." The little man had no option but to take it. The big concern could and did exempt itself from liability in its own interest without regard to the little man. It got away with it time after time. When the courts said to the big concern, "You must put it in clear words," the big concern had no hesitation in doing so. It knew well that the little man would never read the exemption clauses or understand them.

It was a bleak winter for our law of contract. It is illustrated by two cases, Thompson v London, Midland and Scottish Railway Co. (in which there was exemption from liability, not on the ticket, but only in small print at the back of the timetable, and the company were held not liable) and L'Estrange v F Graucob (in which there was complete exemption in small print at the bottom of the order form, and the company were held not liable).

The secret weapon

Faced with this abuse of power – by the strong against the weak – by the use of the small print of the conditions – the judges did what they could to put a curb upon it. They still had before them the idol, "freedom of contract." They still knelt down and worshipped it, but they concealed under their cloaks a secret weapon. They used it to stab the idol in the back. This weapon was called "the true construction of the contract". They used it with great skill and ingenuity. They used it so as to depart from the natural meaning of the words of the exemption clause and to put upon them a strained and unnatural construction. In case after case, they said that the words were not strong enough to give the big concern exemption from liability; or that in the circumstances the big concern was not entitled to rely on the exemption clause. If a ship deviated from the contractual voyage, the owner could not rely on the exemption clause. If a warehouseman stored the goods in the wrong warehouse, he could not pray in aid the limitation clause. If the seller supplied goods different in kind from those contracted for, he could not rely on any exemption from liability. If a shipowner delivered goods to a person without production of the bill of lading, he could not escape responsibility by reference to an exemption clause. In short, whenever the wide words – in their natural meaning – would give rise to an unreasonable result, the judges either rejected them as repugnant to the main purpose of the contract, or else cut them down to size in order to produce a reasonable result. This is illustrated by these cases in the House of Lords: Glynn v Margetson & Co.; London and North Western Railway Co. v Neilson; Cunard Steamship Co. Ltd. v Buerger; and by Canada Steamship Lines Ltd v The King and Sze Hai Tong Bank Ltd. v Rambler Cycle Co. Ltd. in the Privy Council; and innumerable cases in the Court of Appeal, culminating in Levison v Patent Steam Carpet Cleaning Co. Ltd. But when the clause was itself reasonable and gave rise to a reasonable result, the judges upheld it; at any rate, when the clause did not exclude liability entirely but only limited it to a reasonable amount. So where goods were deposited in a cloakroom or sent to a laundry for cleaning, it was quite reasonable for the company to limit their liability to a reasonable amount, having regard to the small charge made for the service. These are illustrated by Gibaud v Great Eastern Railway Co., Alderslade v Hendon Laundry Ltd., and Gillespie Bros & Co Ltd v Roy Bowles Transport Ltd.

=== House of Lords ===
The House of Lords unanimously upheld the judgment of Lord Denning that the limitation of liability to the cost of the seeds was not effective, because given the relative positions and capability of insurance, it failed the reasonableness test. Lord Diplock gave the first judgment.

My Lords, I have had the advantage of reading in advance the speech to be delivered by my noble and learned friend, Lord Bridge of Harwich, in favour of dismissing this appeal upon grounds which reflect the reasoning although not the inimitable style of Lord Denning M.R.'s judgment in the Court of Appeal.

I agree entirely with Lord Bridge's speech and there is nothing that I could usefully add to it; but I cannot refrain from noting with regret, which is, I am sure, shared by all members of the Appellate Committee of this House, that Lord Denning M.R.'s judgment in the instant case, which was delivered on September 29, 1982, is probably the last in which your Lordships will have the opportunity of enjoying his eminently readable style of exposition and his stimulating and percipient approach to the continuing development of the common law to which he has himself in his judicial lifetime made so outstanding a contribution.

Lord Bridge gave the leading judgment. He agreed with Lord Denning MR that clause 2 applied to the seeds in question, and that it was a "strained construction" (following Lord Diplock's dicta in Photo Production Ltd v Securicor Transport Ltd to say otherwise. At page 810 he said,

the passing of ... the Unfair Contract Terms Act 1977, had removed from judges the temptation to resort to the device of ascribing to words appearing in exemption clauses a tortured meaning so as to avoid giving effect to an exclusion or limitation of liability when the judge thought that in the circumstances to do so would be unfair.

On the question of the term's fairness, Lord Bridge held,

the court must entertain a whole range of considerations, put them in the scales on one side or the other, and decide at the end of the day on which side the balance comes down. There will sometimes be room for a legitimate difference of judicial opinion as to what the answer should be, where it will be impossible to say that one view is demonstrably wrong and the other demonstrably right. It must follow, in my view, that, when asked to review such a decision on appeal, the appellate court should treat the original decision with the utmost respect and refrain from interference with it unless satisfied that it proceeded upon some erroneous principle or was plainly and obviously wrong.

On the question of fairness, the decisive evidence was that witnesses (for the seedsmen) had said the industry's practice had always been to negotiate damages claims if they seemed genuine and justified. That was clear recognition that the relevant condition would not be fair or reasonable.

Lord Scarman, Lord Roskill and Lord Brightman concurred.

In the House of Lords, Leonard Hoffmann QC and Patrick Twigg made submissions for George Mitchell and Mark Waller QC made submissions for Finney Lock Seeds.

== Significance ==
George Mitchell was Lord Denning's last judgment in the Court of Appeal before he retired. His dissenting opinion, which was upheld by the House of Lords, was partly a riposte to the last century of common law, dating back at least to Printing and Numerical Registering Co v Sampson where Master of the Rolls Lord Jessel had propounded freedom of contract as a core public policy.

By contrast, Lord Denning thought that the ability of the courts to control unfair terms, now granted through legislation, had made it possible to apply sensible principles when construing contracts. There was no need to twist the meaning of words to reach a fair result, if unfair contract terms could be scrapped on the ground that one party had unequal bargaining power.

However, the contra proferentem rule still forms part of the European Community's consumer protection law as imposed in the Unfair Consumer Contract Terms Directive and retained in UK law by s. 69 of the Consumer Rights Act 2015.

== See also ==
- English contract law
