= Chartbrook Ltd v Persimmon Homes Ltd =

English contract law case

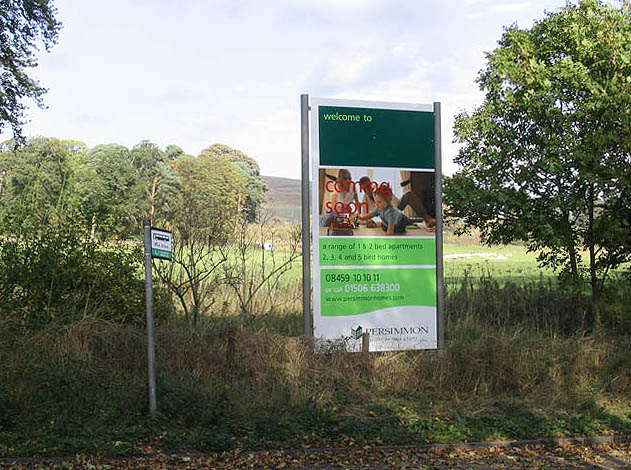
- A Persimmon Homes construction sign
- Court: House of Lords
- Citations: [2009] UKHL 38, [2009] 1 AC 1101, [2009] 3 WLR 267, [2009] 4 All ER 677, 125 ConLR 1, [2009] 3 EGLR 119, [2010] 1 LRC 639

Case history
- Prior actions: [2008] EWCA Civ 183, [2008] 2 All E.R. (Comm) 387

Case opinions
- Lord Hope, Lord Hoffmann, Lord Rodger, Lord Walker and Baroness Hale

Keywords
- Interpretation

Chartbrook Ltd v Persimmon Homes Ltd [2009] UKHL 38 is an English contract law case concerned with the interpretation of contracts. It creates a so-called "red ink" rule, meaning that there is no limit to verbal rearrangement that the court may deploy to give a commercial sensible meaning when construing a contract in its bargaining context. It also, importantly, reaffirmed the rule of English law that pre-contractual negotiations were ordinarily inadmissible when construing a contract.

== Facts ==
Persimmon agreed to get planning permission, build some residences on Chartbrook’s land at 1 to 9 Hardwicks Way, Wandsworth, and then sell the properties. Chartbrook would pay for it, subject to a balancing payment or "additional residential payment" (ARP) defined as "23.4% of the price achieved for each residential unit in excess of the minimum guaranteed residential unit value less the costs and incentives". This would be paid by Persimmon to Chartbrook. Chartbrook calculated this to mean £4,484,862 but Persimmon said on a proper construction the amount was £897,051. Persimmon argued that even if they were wrong on construction of the document, rectification should be granted, and if not their pre-contractual negotiations should be taken into account. Chartbrook argued that the pre-contractual negotiations were inadmissible.

The High Court and Court of Appeal agreed with Chartbrook's interpretation. Persimmon Ltd appealed on the interpretation given and argued that if they failed on those grounds, the contract should be construed in light of previous negotiations, or that the court should allow for the document to be rectified, because it was clear that the intentions of the parties was different from that found. Accordingly, it contended that the rule in Prenn v Simmonds that pre-contractual negotiations should be ignored, was an illogical rule and should be overturned.

== Judgment ==
The House of Lords held that Persimmon’s interpretation was right, and the amount due was £897,051. There was no limit to the ‘red ink’ that the court could use to correct the verbiage when it was clear that in its commercial context, an agreement could not make sense. The only requirement was that it should be clear to a reasonable person what was meant. It was rejected that pre-contractual negotiations should be taken into account. If they had not so held, they would have granted rectification. Lord Hoffmann said the following.

15. It clearly requires a strong case to persuade the court that something must have gone wrong with the language and the judge and the majority of the Court of Appeal did not think that such a case had been made out. On the other hand, Lawrence Collins LJ thought it had. It is, I am afraid, not unusual that an interpretation which does not strike one person as sufficiently irrational to justify a conclusion that there has been a linguistic mistake will seem commercially absurd to another: compare the Kirin-Amgen case. Such a division of opinion occurred in the Investors Compensation Scheme case itself. The subtleties of language are such that no judicial guidelines or statements of principle can prevent it from sometimes happening. It is fortunately rare because most draftsmen of formal documents think about what they are saying and use language with care. But this appears to be an exceptional case in which the drafting was careless and no one noticed.

16. I agree with the dissenting opinion of Lawrence Collins LJ because I think that to interpret the definition of ARP in accordance with ordinary rules of syntax makes no commercial sense.

[...]

27. If your Lordships agree with this conclusion about the construction of the contract, the appeal must be allowed. There is no need to say anything more. But Persimmon advanced two alternative arguments of very considerable general importance and I think it is appropriate that your Lordships should deal with them. The first was that (contrary to the unanimous opinion of the judge and the Court of Appeal) the House should take into account the pre-contractual negotiations, which in the opinion of Lawrence Collins LJ (at paragraph 132), were determinative confirmation of Persimmon’s argument on construction. The second was that the judge and the Court of Appeal had misunderstood the principles upon which rectification may be decreed and that if Persimmon had failed on construction, the agreement should have been rectified.

28. The rule that pre-contractual negotiations are inadmissible was clearly reaffirmed by this House in Prenn v Simmonds [1971] 1 WLR 1381...

30. To allow evidence of pre-contractual negotiations to be used in aid of construction would therefore require the House to depart from a long and consistent line of authority, the binding force of which has frequently been acknowledged: see Bank of Scotland v Dunedin Property Investment Co Ltd 1998 SC 657, 665 (“well-established and salutary", per Lord President Rodger; Alexiou v Campbell [2007] UKPC 11 (“vouched by…compelling authorities", per Lord Bingham of Cornhill.) The House is nevertheless invited to do so, on the ground that the rule is illogical and prevents a court from, as the Lord Justice Clerk in Inglis v John Buttery & Co (1878) 3 App Cas 552 said, putting itself in the position of the parties and ascertaining their true intent.

31. In Prenn v Simmonds [1971] 1 WLR 1381, 1384 Lord Wilberforce said by way of justification of the rule:

The reason for not admitting evidence of these exchanges is not a technical one or even mainly one of convenience, (though the attempt to admit it did greatly prolong the case and add to its expense). It is simply that such evidence is unhelpful. By the nature of things, where negotiations are difficult, the parties’ positions, with each passing letter, are changing and until the final agreement, though converging, still divergent. It is only the final document which records a consensus.... In a limited sense this is true: the commercial, or business object, of the transaction, objectively ascertained, may be a surrounding fact. Cardozo J. thought so in the Utica Bank case. And if it can be shown that one interpretation completely frustrates that object, to the extent of rendering the contract futile, that may be a strong argument for an alternative interpretation, if that can reasonably be found....

32. Critics of the rule, such as Thomas J in New Zealand (Yoshimoto v Canterbury Golf International Ltd [2001] 1 NZLR 523, 538-549) Professor David McLauchlan (“Contract Interpretation: What is it About?” (2009) 31:5 Sydney Law Review 5-51) and Lord Nicholls of Birkenhead (“My Kingdom for a Horse: The Meaning of Words” (2005) 121 LQR 577-591) point out that although all this may usually be true, in some cases it will not. Among the dirt of aspirations, proposals and counter-proposals there may gleam the gold of a genuine consensus on some aspect of the transaction expressed in terms which would influence an objective observer in construing the language used by the parties in their final agreement. Why should court deny itself the assistance of this material in deciding what the parties must be taken to have meant? Mr Christopher Nugee QC, who appeared for Persimmon, went so far as to say that in saying that such evidence was unhelpful, Lord Wilberforce was not only providing a justification for the rule but delimiting its extent. It should apply only in cases in which the pre-contractual negotiations are actually irrelevant. If they do assist a court in deciding what an objective observer would have construed the contract to mean, they should be admitted. I cannot accept this submission. It is clear from what Lord Wilberforce said and the authorities upon which he relied that the exclusionary rule is not qualified in this way. There is no need for a special rule to exclude irrelevant evidence.

33. I do however accept that it would not be inconsistent with the English objective theory of contractual interpretation to admit evidence of previous communications between the parties as part of the background which may throw light upon what they meant by the language they used. The general rule, as I said in Bank of Credit and Commerce International SA v Ali [2002] 1 AC 251, 269, is that there are no conceptual limits to what can properly be regarded as background. Prima facie, therefore, the negotiations are potentially relevant background. They may be inadmissible simply because they are irrelevant to the question which the court has to decide, namely, what the parties would reasonably be taken to have meant by the language which they finally adopted to express their agreement. For the reasons given by Lord Wilberforce, that will usually be the case. But not always. In exceptional cases, as Lord Nicholls has forcibly argued, a rule that prior negotiations are always inadmissible will prevent the court from giving effect to what a reasonable man in the position of the parties would have taken them to have meant. Of course judges may disagree over whether in a particular case such evidence is helpful or not. In Yoshimoto v Canterbury Golf International Ltd [2001] 1 NZLR 523. Thomas J thought he had found gold in the negotiations but the Privy Council said it was only dirt. As I have said, there is nothing unusual or surprising about such differences of opinion. In principle, however, I would accept that previous negotiations may be relevant.

34. It therefore follows that while it is true that, as Lord Wilberforce said, inadmissibility is normally based in irrelevance, there will be cases in which it can be justified only on pragmatic grounds. I must consider these grounds, which have been explored in detail in the literature and on the whole rejected by academic writers but supported by some practitioners.

35. The first is that the admission of pre-contractual negotiations would create greater uncertainty of outcome in disputes over interpretation and add to the cost of advice, litigation or arbitration. Everyone engaged in the exercise would have to read the correspondence and statements would have to be taken from those who took part in oral negotiations. Not only would this be time-consuming and expensive but the scope for disagreement over whether the material affected the construction of the agreement (as in the Yoshimoto case) would be considerably increased. As against this, it is said that when a dispute over construction is litigated, evidence of the pre-contractual negotiations is almost invariably tendered in support of an alternative claim for rectification (as in Prenn v Simmonds and in this case) or an argument based on estoppel by convention or some alleged exception to the exclusionary rule. Even if such an alternative claim does not succeed, the judge will have read and possibly been influenced by the evidence. The rule therefore achieves little in saving costs and its abolition would restore some intellectual honesty to the judicial approach to interpretation.

36. There is certainly a view in the profession that the less one has to resort to any form of background in aid of interpretation, the better. The document should so far as possible speak for itself. As Popham CJ said in the Countess of Rutland’s Case (1604) 5 Co Rep 25, 25b, 26a:

it would be inconvenient, that matters in writing made by advice and on consideration, and which finally import the certain truth of the agreement of the parties should be controlled by averment of the parties to be proved by the uncertain testimony of slippery memory.

[...]

38. I rather doubt whether the ICS case produced a dramatic increase in the amount of material produced by way of background for the purposes of contractual interpretation. But pre-contractual negotiations seem to me capable of raising practical questions different from those created by other forms of background. Whereas the surrounding circumstances are, by definition, objective facts, which will usually be uncontroversial, statements in the course of pre-contractual negotiations will be drenched in subjectivity and may, if oral, be very much in dispute. It is often not easy to distinguish between those statements which (if they were made at all) merely reflect the aspirations of one or other of the parties and those which embody at least a provisional consensus which may throw light on the meaning of the contract which was eventually concluded. But the imprecision of the line between negotiation and provisional agreement is the very reason why in every case of dispute over interpretation, one or other of the parties is likely to require a court or arbitrator to take the course of negotiations into account. Your Lordships’ experience in the analogous case of resort to statements in Hansard under the rule in Pepper v Hart [1993] AC 593 suggests that such evidence will be produced in any case in which there is the remotest chance that it may be accepted and that even these cases will be only the tip of a mountain of discarded but expensive investigation. Pepper v Hart has also encouraged ministers and others to make statements in the hope of influencing the construction which the courts will give to a statute and it is possible that negotiating parties will be encouraged to improve the bundle of correspondence with similar statements.

39. Supporters of the admissibility of pre-contractual negotiations draw attention to the fact that Continental legal systems seem to have little difficulty in taking them into account. Both the Unidroit Principles of International Commercial Contracts (1994 and 2004 revision) and the Principles of European Contract Law (1999) provide that in ascertaining the “common intention of the parties", regard shall be had to prior negotiations: articles 4.3 and 5.102 respectively. The same is true of the United Nations Convention on Contracts for the International Sale of Goods (1980). But these instruments reflect the French philosophy of contractual interpretation, which is altogether different from that of English law. As Professor Catherine Valcke explains in an illuminating article (“On Comparing French and English Contract Law: Insights from Social Contract Theory”) (16 January 2009), French law regards the intentions of the parties as a pure question of subjective fact, their volonté psychologique, uninfluenced by any rules of law. It follows that any evidence of what they said or did, whether to each other or to third parties, may be relevant to establishing what their intentions actually were. There is in French law a sharp distinction between the ascertainment of their intentions and the application of legal rules which may, in the interests of fairness to other parties or otherwise, limit the extent to which those intentions are given effect. English law, on the other hand, mixes up the ascertainment of intention with the rules of law by depersonalising the contracting parties and asking, not what their intentions actually were, but what a reasonable outside observer would have taken them to be. One cannot in my opinion simply transpose rules based on one philosophy of contractual interpretation to another, or assume that the practical effect of admitting such evidence under the English system of civil procedure will be the same as that under a Continental system.

40. In his judgment in the present case, Briggs J thought that the most powerful argument against admitting evidence of pre-contractual negotiations was that it would be unfair to a third party who took an assignment of the contract or advanced money on its security. Such a person would not have been privy to the negotiations and may have taken the terms of the contract at face value. There is clearly strength in this argument, but it is fair to say that the same point can be made (and has been made, notably by Saville LJ in National Bank of Sharjah v Dellborg [1997] EWCA Civ 2070, which is unreported, but the relevant passage is cited in Lord Bingham’s paper in the Edinburgh Law Review) in respect of the admissibility of any form of background.

41. The conclusion I would reach is that there is no clearly established case for departing from the exclusionary rule. The rule may well mean, as Lord Nicholls has argued, that parties are sometimes held bound by a contract in terms which, upon a full investigation of the course of negotiations, a reasonable observer would not have taken them to have intended. But a system which sometimes allows this to happen may be justified in the more general interest of economy and predictability in obtaining advice and adjudicating disputes. It is, after all, usually possible to avoid surprises by carefully reading the documents before signing them and there are the safety nets of rectification and estoppel by convention. Your Lordships do not have the material on which to form a view. It is possible that empirical study (for example, by the Law Commission) may show that the alleged disadvantages of admissibility are not in practice very significant or that they are outweighed by the advantages of doing more precise justice in exceptional cases or falling into line with international conventions. But the determination of where the balance of advantage lies is not in my opinion suitable for judicial decision. Your Lordships are being asked to depart from a rule which has been in existence for many years and several times affirmed by the House. There is power to do so under the Practice Statement (Judicial Precedent) [1966] 1 WLR 1234. But that power was intended, as Lord Reid said in R v National Insurance Comrs, Ex p Hudson [1972] AC 944, 966, to be applied only in a small number of cases in which previous decisions of the House were “thought to be impeding the proper development of the law or to have led to results which were unjust or contrary to public policy". I do not think that anyone can be confident that this is true of the exclusionary rule.

42. The rule excludes evidence of what was said or done during the course of negotiating the agreement for the purpose of drawing inferences about what the contract meant. It does not exclude the use of such evidence for other purposes: for example, to establish that a fact which may be relevant as background was known to the parties, or to support a claim for rectification or estoppel. These are not exceptions to the rule. They operate outside it.

[...]

47. On its facts, the Karen Oltmann was in my opinion an illegitimate extension of the “private dictionary” principle which, taken to its logical conclusion, would destroy the exclusionary rule and any practical advantages which it may have. There are two legitimate safety devices which will in most cases prevent the exclusionary rule from causing injustice. But they have to be specifically pleaded and clearly established. One is rectification. The other is estoppel by convention, which has been developed since the decision in the Karen Oltmann: see Amalgamated Investment & Property Co Ltd v Texas Commerce International Bank Ltd [1982] QB 84. If the parties have negotiated an agreement upon some common assumption, which may include an assumption that certain words will bear a certain meaning, they may be estopped from contending that the words should be given a different meaning. Both of these remedies lie outside the exclusionary rule, since they start from the premise that, as a matter of construction, the agreement does not have the meaning for which the party seeking rectification or raising an estoppel contends.

Lord Hope, Lord Rodger, and Lord Walker agreed.

Baroness Hale agreed with the result, but also said the following:

99. But I have to confess that I would not have found it quite so easy to reach this conclusion had we not been made aware of the agreement which the parties had reached on this aspect of their bargain during the negotiations which led up to the formal contract. On any objective view, that made the matter crystal clear. This, to me, increased the attractions of accepting counsel’s eloquent invitation to reconsider the rule in Prenn v Simmonds [1971] 1 WLR 1381, the pot so gently but effectively stirred by Lord Nicholls of Birkenhead in his Chancery Bar Association lecture of 2005 ([2005] 121 LQR 577). My experience at the Law Commission has shown me how difficult it is to achieve flexible and nuanced reform to a rule of the common law by way of legislation. In the end abolition may be the only workable legislative solution, as eventually happened with the hearsay rule (Law Com No 216 (1993), BAILII: [1993] EWLC 216), The Hearsay Rule in Civil Proceedings). Even that can prove difficult if, on analysis, the view is taken that the rule has no real content, as with the parol evidence rule (Law Com No 154 (1986, BAILII: [1986] EWLC 154), The Parol Evidence Rule). The courts, on the other hand, are able to achieve step-by-step changes which can distinguish cases in which such evidence is "helpful" from cases in which it is not. 100. However, the approach to rectification adopted by Lord Hoffmann would go a long way towards providing a solution. If the test of the parties’ continuing common intentions is an objective one, then the court is looking to see whether there was such a prior consensus and if so what it was. Negotiations where there was no such consensus are indeed “unhelpful". But negotiations where consensus was reached are very helpful indeed. If the language in the eventual contract does not reflect that consensus, then unless there has been a later variation of it, the formal contract should be rectified to reflect it. It makes little sense if the test for construing their prior consensus is different from the objective test for construing their eventual contract. This situation is, and should be, quite different from the situation where one party is mistaken as to its meaning and the other party knows this - the latter should not be permitted to take advantage of the former.

== See also ==
- English contract law
