= WN Hillas & Co Ltd v Arcos Ltd =

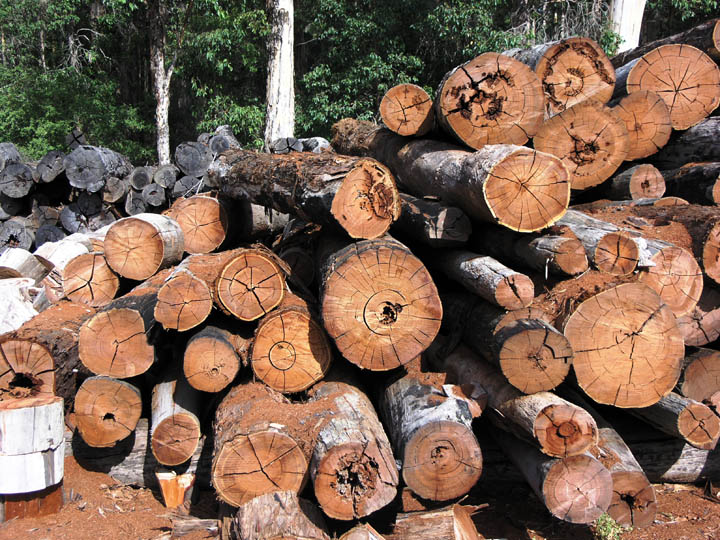
- Court: House of Lords
- Citation: [1932] UKHL 2, (1932) 147 LT 503 (HL)
- Transcript: Full text of decision

Case history
- Prior action: (1932) 40 Lloyd’s Rep (CA)

Court membership
- Judges sitting: Lord Tomlin, Lord Warrington of Clyffe, Lord Thankerton, Lord Macmillan, Lord Wright

WN Hillas & Co Ltd v Arcos Ltd [1932] UKHL 2 is a landmark House of Lords case on English contract law where the court first began to move away from a strict, literal interpretation of the terms of a contract, and instead interpreted it with a view to preserve the bargain. The court ruled that judges may imply terms into a contract based on the past dealings of the parties rather than void the agreement.

Lord Wright stated in this case that people who give good consideration can bind themselves to a duty to negotiate in good faith, but this view was controversially rejected in a later House of Lords case, Walford v Miles (1992).

Hillas & Company were merchants purchasing timber from Arcos. Hillas and Arcos reached an agreement to purchase 22,000 standards of timber, under the specific condition that they should also have the option of entering into a contract with Arcos to purchase 100,000 standards the following year with a 5% reduction on price. Arcos refused to sell them the 100,000 standards the following year. Hillas was successful at trial, which Arcos appealed successfully to the Court of Appeal.

== See also ==
- G Scammell & Nephew Ltd v Ouston [1941] 1 AC 251
- Smith v Hughes (1871) LR 6 QB 597
- Hartog v Colin & Shields [1939] 3 All ER 566
- Frederick E Rose (London) Ltd v William H Pim Junior & Co Ltd [1953] 2 QB 450
