= Fiona Raitt =

Prof Fiona Raitt
- Born: May 9, 1956, Perth, Scotland
- Died: February 8, 2025 (aged 68)
- Education: University of Edinburgh (LLB)
- Occupations: Lawyer, Professor of Evidence and Social Justice
- Years active: 1983-2014
- Employer: University of Dundee
- Known for: Victim's rights and justice reform
- Notable work: Raitt, F (2013). Evidence: Principles, Policy and Practice (2nd ed).; Raitt, F (2009). Independent Legal Representation for Complainers in Sexual Offence Trials. Rape Crisis Scotland.

Fiona Raitt LLB (9 May 1956 – 8 February 2025) was a Scottish lawyer and academic. Her practice was centred in social justice and she campaigned to improve victim's rights in Scottish sexual offences trials. She wrote a landmark report for Rape Crisis Scotland and authored seminal legal textbooks. She was Professor of Evidence and Social Justice at the University of Dundee until she retired in 2014.

== Early life and education ==
Fiona Elizabeth Raitt was born in Perth, Scotland on 9 May 1956. Her mother, Elizabeth Craig Morrin, instilled in her daughter a sense of justice from an early age. Raitt graduated from the University of Edinburgh with a Bachelor of Laws (LLB) in 1978.

== Career ==
Raitt co-founded a feminist law firm, Wilson & Raitt, in Dundee with partner Liz Wilson in 1983. The practice closed in 1993, when Wilson was appointed Chair of the Child Support Appeal Tribunal. Raitt took on an academic role with the University of Dundee.

As an academic, Raitt authored a number of seminal legal texts and academic papers on topics including family law, domestic violence, and rape trials. She was promoted to chair in 2005 and chose the title Professor of Evidence and Social Justice. Her teaching was recognised with the Chancellor's Award for Outstanding Contribution for Teaching.

With David Field, she co-authored the second edition of The Law of Evidence in Scotland (1996), followed by a third edition as sole author in 2001, known as Field on Evidence, which was replaced in 2008 with Evidence: Principles, Policy and Practice.

In 2009, she authored a landmark report for Rape Crisis Scotland.which called for independent legal representation for complainants in sexual offences trials. It also argued that victims' sexual histories were not relevant. This report influenced the Victims, Witnesses and Justice Reform (Scotland) Act 2025 which was enacted by the Scottish Parliament.

She was on the managing committee of the Dundee Rape Crisis Centre, and volunteered with Women's Aid and the Legal Advice Network.

== Publications ==
=== Books ===
Field, D and Raitt, F (1996). The Law of Evidence in Scotland (2nd ed). W Green.

Hackman, L; Raitt, F; Black, S (2019). The Expert Witness, Forensic Science and the Criminal Justice Systems of the UK. CRC Press, USA.

Raitt, F (1997). Careers in Scots Law: Choosing a Law Degree and a Career. Green's Careers for Law Graduates.

Raitt, F and Zeedyk, S (2000). The Implicit Relation of Psychology and Law. Psychology Press.

Raitt, F (2001). The Law of Evidence in Scotland (3rd ed). W Green.

Raitt, F (2008). Evidence: Principles, Policy and Practice. W Green.

Raitt, F (2013). Evidence: Principles, Policy and Practice (2nd ed). W Green.

=== Papers ===
Raitt, F. and Ferguson, P. (2006). Re-Configuring Scots Criminal Procedure - Seismic Shifts?’ Edinburgh Law Review 10: 102.

== Later life and death ==
Throughout her life, Raitt was an outdoor enthusiast and climbed many Munros, which she preferred to call 'Jessicas' after the 19th century women who had climbed the mountains in long skirts. She also owned three horses which she rode cross-country.

She took early retirement from the University of Dundee in 2014. She died on 8 February 2025 after a long illness.
