= Hollier v Rambler Motors (AMC) Ltd =

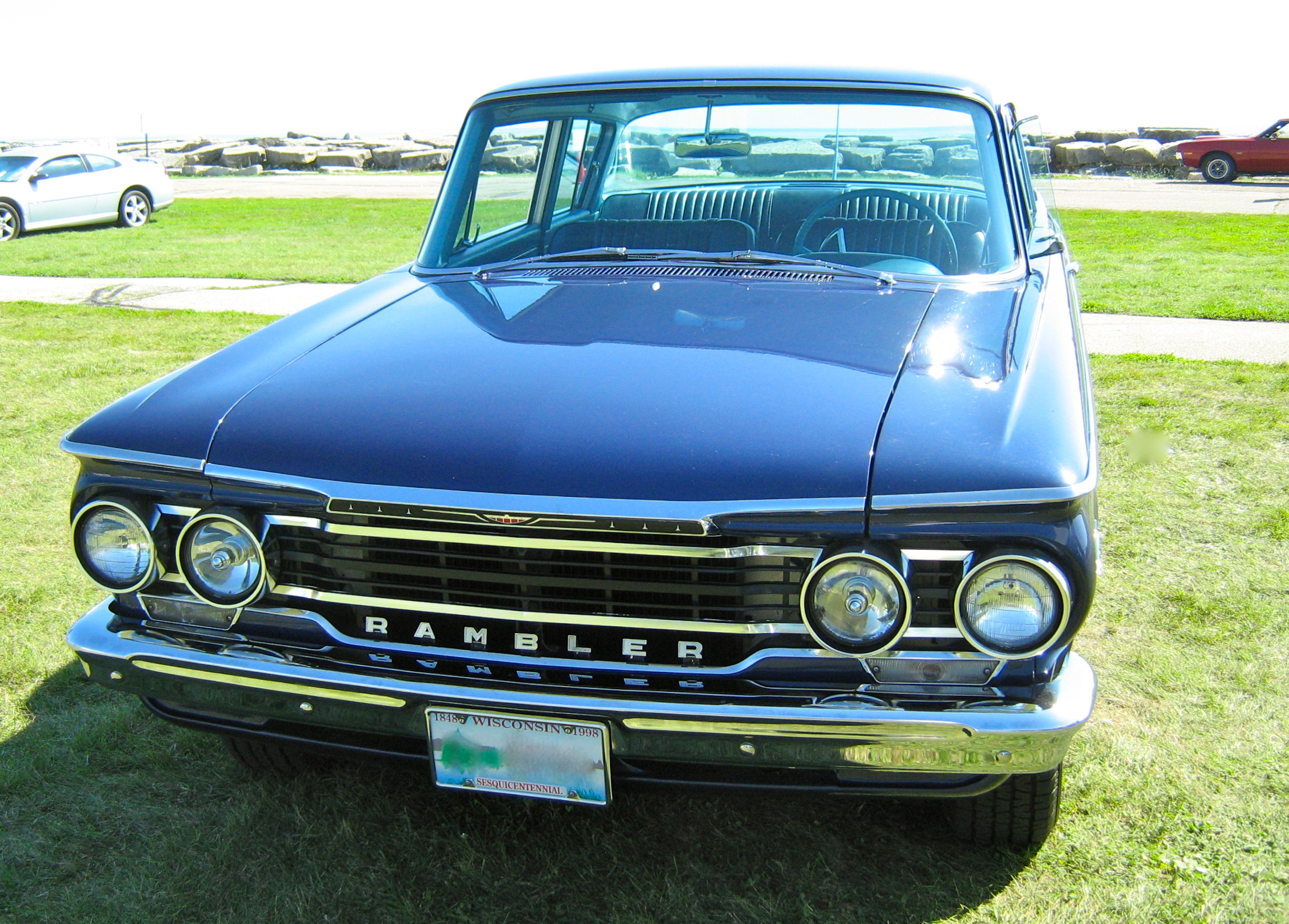
- Court: Court of Appeal
- Decided: 19 November 1971
- Citations: [1971] EWCA Civ 12, [1972] 2 QB 71, [1972] 2 WLR 401, [1972] 1 All ER 399

Court membership
- Judges sitting: Salmon LJ, Stampe LJ, and Latey J

Keywords
- Exclusion clause, interpretation

Hollier v Rambler Motors (AMC) Ltd [1971] EWCA Civ 12 is an English contract law case, concerning the incorporation of terms into a contract and the contra proferentum rule of interpretation. It shows an example of a very hostile interpretation of exclusion clauses.

== Facts ==
Walter Hollier took his Rambler car to an automobile repair shop, Rambler Motors. He had been to this garage on three or four occasions in the past five years before, and he had usually signed an invoice which said the

"company is not responsible for damage caused by fire to customers’ cars on the premises."

He did not sign the form on this occasion. Unfortunately, some wiring in the garage was faulty. Rambler Motors had negligently failed to inspect or maintain the wiring in the shop. A fire broke out and burnt down the garage, with Hollier's car in it. Hollier sued Rambler Motors for the cost of his car.

== Judgment ==
The Court of Appeal held that a previous course of dealing did not incorporate the term, because there was neither a regular nor consistent course of dealings. It went on to ask what would have happened were it incorporated, and held that the exclusion clause would still not have been effective to save Rambler Motors Ltd for liability, because it should be construed against the person relying on it (contra proferentum) and this clause covered more than negligence. A reasonable person would think liability for other things beyond the garage's own control would be excluded, but not the garage's own fault. Salmon LJ observed the following:

No doubt merchants, tradesmen, garage proprietors and the like are a little shy of writing in an exclusion clause quite so bluntly... Clearly it would not tend to attract customers, and might even put many off… in order for the clause to be effective the language should be so plain that it clearly bears that meaning. I do not think that defendants should be allowed to shelter behind language which might lull the customer into a false sense of security…

He refers to Scrutton LJ in Rutter v Palmer [1922] 2 KB 87 saying a clear clause excluding negligence liability "will more readily operate to exempt him." Also, in Alderslade v Hendon Laundry Ltd [1945] KB 189, Lord Greene MR was not seeking to extend the law, and here was quite different, because the reasonable person would see a number of other causes of fire. It would surprise an ordinary person if it applied to a fire caused by the garage’s own negligence (rather than an external cause). If they wanted to make exclusions for their own negligence 'they ought to have done so in far plainer language'.

== Significance ==
The case "illustrates the courts' reluctance to permit the exclusion of liability of negligence." The court also held that "a customer could understand the clause to mean that the defendants were not liable for a fire caused without their negligence." The court also held that three or four transactions over a five-year period were not enough to incorporate an exemption clause into the consumer contract.

== See also ==
- English contract law
- Canada Steamship Lines Ltd v The King [1952] AC 192
- Photo Production Ltd v Securicor Transport Ltd [1980] AC 827
