= Fergus Morton, Baron Morton of Henryton =

British judge (1887–1973)

The Right Honourable The Lord Morton of Henryton MC PC
- Portrait by Harry Maude Jonas

Lord of Appeal in Ordinary
- In office 18 April 1947 – 5 April 1959
- Succeeded by: The Lord Jenkins

Lord Justice of Appeal
- In office 11 October 1944 – 18 April 1947
- Preceded by: Sir Fairfax Luxmoore

Justice of the High Court
- In office 5 January 1938 – 11 October 1944
- Preceded by: Sir Albert Clauson
- Succeeded by: Sir Charles Romer

Personal details
- Born: Fergus Dunlop Morton; 17 October 1887 Kelvinside, Glasgow
- Died: 18 July 1973 (aged 85) Cookham, Berkshire
- Spouse: Margaret Greenlees (m. 1914)
- Education: St John's College, Cambridge

Fergus Dunlop Morton, Baron Morton of Henryton, MC, PC (17 October 1887 – 18 July 1973) was a British barrister and judge who was a Lord of Appeal in Ordinary from 1947 to 1959. The son of a Scottish stockbroker, Morton was educated in Scotland and England, before being called to the English bar. After serving with the British Army in the First World War, during which he won the Military Cross, he developed a successful Chancery practice. He was appointed to the High Court in 1938, promoted to the Court of Appeal in 1944, and to the House of Lords in 1947, retiring from judicial service in 1959.

== Background and education ==
Born in Glasgow, Morton was the youngest child and one of three sons of George Morton and Janet, née Wilson. His father, from a farming family, left school aged thirteen and acquired a considerable fortune as a stockbroker. He was educated at Kelvinside Academy and then went to St John's College, Cambridge with an open scholarship in classics. Morton narrowly missed first class honours in part one of the classical tripos in 1909 owing to illness, before taking first class honours in part two of the law tripos in 1910, topping the class list.

== Legal career ==
After a year with a firm of solicitors, Morton was called to the English bar by the Inner Temple in 1912, also joining Lincoln's Inn in 1914. He was first the pupil of the conveyancer A. L. Ellis, then of leading Chancery junior Dighton Pollock.

On the outbreak of the First World War in 1914, he was commissioned as lieutenant into the Highland Light Infantry. He saw action in German East Africa, and was promoted to captain in 1915. In July 1918, he was awarded the Military Cross. Both of his brothers were killed in the war.

From 1918–19, Morton was attached to the War Office, before resuming his career at the Chancery bar. His practice grew rapidly, and he became a King's Counsel in 1929. In 1932 he was elected a bencher of Lincoln's Inn (serving as treasurer in 1953).

== Judicial career ==
Morton was appointed to the High Court of Justice in 1938, receiving the customary knighthood, and was assigned to the Chancery Division. From 1941, he chaired the Black List Committee for the following five years. He was appointed a Lord Justice of Appeal in 1944 and on this occasion was sworn of the Privy Council. Three years thereafter the number of the Lords of Appeal in Ordinary was increased to nine and one of the new seats was assigned to Morton. He obtained the traditional life peerage, taking the title Baron Morton of Henryton, of Henryton, in the County of Ayr.

Morton joined the Council of Legal Education in 1949, which he left after four years. In 1950 he sat on the Committee on the Law of Intestate Succession (named the Morton Committee) and in the subsequent year he became chairman of the Royal Commission on Marriage and Divorce (named the Morton Commission). Lincoln's Inn selected him its treasurer in 1953. He retired as Lord of Appeal in 1959.

== Honours ==
In 1940, he was nominated an honorary fellow by his former college and in 1951 received Honorary Doctorates of Law by the University of Cambridge as well as the University of Glasgow. Cambridge's Senate elected Morton a Deputy High Steward in 1954. Two years later, the University of St Andrews and in 1957 the University of Sydney conferred additional doctorates upon him. Both the American Bar Association and the Canadian Bar Association made Morton honorary members. He became also an honorary member of the Faculty of Advocates.

== Notable decisions ==
- Margarine Reference [1951] AC 179 – Canadian federalism
- Paris v Stepney Borough Council [1951] AC 367 – standard of care
- Canada Steamship Lines Ltd v R [1952] AC 192 – unfair terms contra proferentem
- Lister v Romford Ice and Cold Storage Co Ltd [1957] AC 555 – vicarious liability

== Family ==
Morton married Margaret Greenlees, elder daughter of James Begg; they had a daughter. He died aged 85 in 1973.

== Arms ==
Coat of arms of Fergus Morton, Baron Morton of Henryton
Crest An Eagle wings addorsed Sable gorged with a Collar flory-counterflory and resting the dexter claw on a Mill-Rind Or Escutcheon Argent on a Chevron engrailed Azure between three Roses Gules barbed and seeded proper as many Mill-Rinds Or Motto Mort on se reveille
