= Gordon v Selico =

English contract law case (1986)

Gordon v Selico Ltd
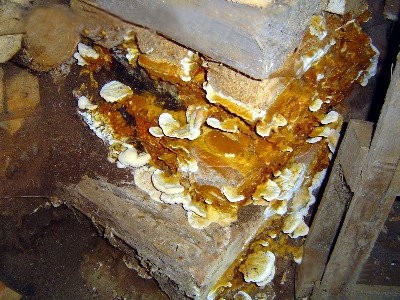
- Court: Court of Appeal
- Citation: (1986) 18 HLR 219, [1986] 1 EGLR 71

Keywords
- Fraudulent misrepresentation, misrepresentation through action

Gordon v Selico (1986) 18 H.L.R. 219 is an English contract law on the subject of misrepresentation by action. It was held that positive actions - in this case, the concealment of dry rot - could amount to operative misrepresentations.

== Facts ==
Mr Gordon and Mrs Teixeira, contracted in November 1978 to purchase a 99-year lease of a flat owned by the defendant, Selico Ltd. The flat was in poor condition, as was the block that contained it, with some evidence of dry rot. Prior to the first inspection by the plaintiffs in about November 1978, the second defendants had instructed some painters to conceal patches of dry rot from view, by painting them. The plaintiffs obtained a detailed survey of the flat in February 1979, which concluded that no dry rot had been found (although only one floorboard had been lifted, and it could not be guaranteed that it did not exist elsewhere in the flat). The plaintiffs moved into their flat on 1 January 1980 and subsequently discovered extensive dry rot in the front bedroom, bathroom and lavatory.

== Judgment ==
Ordinarily, a misrepresentation is made by a statement of supposed fact, or otherwise a statement of intent. It was held by the Court of Appeal that the painting of dry rot to conceal it amounted to a misrepresentation. The court distinguished the set of facts from other cases, where it was held that reliance on an independent surveyor's findings defeated a claim of misrepresentation:

Furthermore, he observed, the plaintiffs and their surveyor had ample opportunity to inspect the flat, an opportunity of which they availed themselves. In these circumstances, decisions such as Horsfall v Thomas and Smith v Hughes, precluded the plaintiffs from complaining of any misrepresentation. Both these two cases, however, are distinguishable from the present on their facts. In the former, not only was the defect in the gun patent and discoverable on inspection, but the purchaser took no steps to inspect it, so that he did in fact not rely on any misrepresentation as to its condition which might have been made. In the latter case, the vendor did nothing to disguise the character of the oats sold. In the present case, on the learned judge's relevant findings of fact, with which we see no reason to disagree, not only was a fraudulent misrepresentation made, which was intended to mislead prospective purchasers of a lease of the property; the misrepresentation did mislead the purchasers and they acted on it to their detriment. In these circumstances, it is in our judgment no answer in law to the claim in deceit for the defendants to say that the plaintiffs or their surveyor could have discovered the dry rot on a closer inspection of Flat C or were content to purchase without any warranty as to the condition of the property; they and their surveyor were in fact misled by the cover-up operation, as they were intended to be. The general principle caveat emptor has no application where a purchaser has been induced to enter the contract of purchase by fraud. Nor can clause 4(2)(a) of the Law Society's Conditions of Sale avail a vendor in these circumstances. These subsidiary submissions made by way of defence to the claim based on deceit are not in our judgment well founded.

== See also ==
- English contract law
- Misrepresentation in English law
