= Saambou v Friedman =

South African legal case

Saambou-Nasionale Bouvereniging v Friedman 1979 (3) SA 978 (AD), sometimes called Saambou v Friedman, was a landmark decision in the Appellate Division of the Supreme Court of South Africa, with crucial implications for contract in that country, as Jansen JA accepted the reliance theory into South African law, citing Smith v Hughes.
