= Bank of Credit and Commerce International SA v Ali =

English contract law case

BCCI v Ali
- Court: UK House of Lords
- Full case name: Bank of Credit and Commerce International SA v. Munawar Ali, Sultana Runi Khan and Others
- Decided: 1 March 2001
- Citation: [2001] UKHL 8; [2001] 1 All ER 961; [2001] 2 WLR 735

Court membership
- Judges sitting: Lord Bingham of Cornhill; Lord Browne-Wilkinson; Lord Nicholls of Birkenhead; Lord Hoffmann; Lord Clyde

Keywords
- Contractual terms, contra proferentem

Bank of Credit and Commerce International SA v Ali [2001] UKHL 8 is an English contract law case in the House of Lords on the limits of freedom of contract, and the contra proferentem principle.

== Facts ==
In 1990, BCCI underwent restructuring, leading to the redundancy of several employees, including Munawar Ali. As part of the redundancy process, Ali signed a COT3 agreement mediated by the Advisory, Conciliation and Arbitration Service (ACAS). The agreement included a clause releasing BCCI SA from "all or any claims whether under statute, Common Law or in Equity of whatsoever nature that exist or may exist." Ali received an ex gratia payment in exchange.

After BCCI's insolvency and the revelation of its corrupt practices, former employees, including Ali, brought claims for stigma damages, arguing the bank breached an implied duty of trust by operating dishonestly. BCCI's liquidators contended the COT3 agreement barred such claims.

== Judgment ==
The House of Lords ruled in favor of Munawar Ali, determining that the general release in the COT3 agreement did not bar his claim for stigma damages. Delivering the leading judgment, Lord Bingham emphasized a contextual interpretation of the settlement agreement, noting its primary purpose was to resolve known employment-related disputes such as redundancy payments and unfair dismissal. At the time of signing, neither party could have foreseen claims arising from BCCI’s concealed corruption, as the bank’s fraudulent practices were deliberately hidden from employees. The court held that general wording in a release, absent explicit language, could not be construed to extinguish claims beyond the parties’ contemplation. Lord Bingham further underscored equitable principles, deeming it unconscionable to enforce the release against employees unaware of BCCI’s wrongdoing, while the bank itself was privy to its misconduct. The ruling reinforced the necessity for clarity in drafting releases and affirmed protections for employees against unknowingly waiving rights to unforeseen claims.

== See also ==
- English contract law
