= Government of the Republic of South Africa v Fibrespinners & Weavers =

South African legal case

Government of the Republic of South Africa v Fibrespinners & Weavers (Pty) Ltd is an important case in South African contract law. It was heard in the Appellate Division by Wessels ACJ, Trollip JA, Hofmeyr JA, Miller JA and Trengove AJA on 15 February 1978, with judgment handed down on 21 March.

== Facts ==
The appellant government of South Africa had instituted action in a Local Division against the respondent, Fibrespinners & Weavers, for damages for the loss of certain grainbags which had been stored by the respondent for reward in terms of a contract of deposit. In terms of a letter written by the government, replacing the terms of the original contract, Fibrespinners was, in consideration for arranging and maintaining, inter alia, an all-risks insurance policy covering the grainbags, "absolved from all responsibility for loss of or damage howsoever arising in respect of" the grainbags "whilst in the care of your company and in or upon any premises owned or used by your company."

Over a period of time a quantity of the grainbags had been stolen by three persons, one of whom was Fibrespinners' chief security officer. The government averred that Fibrespinners was liable on the following alternative grounds:

1. by reason of its breach of contract in failing, upon demand, to deliver to the government the grainbags in question;
2. by reason of gross negligence;
3. by reason of negligence; or
4. by reason of vicarious responsibility for the theft committed by its servant.

Fibrespinners successfully excepted to the claim on the grounds that the averments in the particulars were insufficient to sustain the cause of action.

== Arguments ==
In an appeal, the government contended

1. that the exemption clause in the letter, which did not in terms refer to negligence, had to be construed in accordance with the contra proferentem rule as not relating to liability for loss or damage caused by negligence, but only to liability which arose from some other cause, such as breach of contract, and that the exemption clause applied only where compensation was claimed on a contractual basis, not a delictual basis; and
2. that the exemption clause ought to be so construed as not to apply to responsibility for loss or damage caused by the bailee's gross negligence.

== Judgment ==
The court held that the intention of the parties in regard to the exemption clause was to substitute in the government's favour a right of recourse against the insurance company in the place of such rights of recourse as appellant had against Fibrespinners as bailee; the insurance policy in question covered the government for loss of the grainbags as a result of theft or Fibrespinners' negligence or that of its employees.

The court held further that in law Fibrespinners was liable to compensate the government if the loss or damage was caused

1. by its own wilful wrongdoing or negligent conduct; or
2. possibly by the wilful wrongdoing (i.e. theft) or negligent conduct on the part of its servants, acting in the scope, and within the course, of their employment as such.

The words of the exemption were, the court found, prima facie sufficiently comprehensive in their ordinary meaning to bring under the protective umbrella of the exemption the liability for the loss or damage in 1. or 2. above.

As to the government's contention that the possibility that negligent conduct on the part of the bailee might give rise to alternative causes of action, the one based on contract and the other on delict, the court ruled that this could not render the exemption clause ambiguous and thereby necessitate the use of aids to interpretation. Fibrespinners only required, and could only be granted, exemption from liability for any loss or damage caused by unintentional unlawful conduct: that is, for any loss or damage caused by its breach of contract or by negligence on its part or the part of its employees. It was that exemption which the widely worded clause sought to achieve and those risks that the stipulated insurance sought to cover.

As to the government's contention that there was no justification for so restricting the plain meaning of the words of the exemption clause as contended for, the court determined that there was also no reason of public policy why it should be held that, in so far as the clause referred to loss or damage caused by Fibrespinners' gross negligence, it was not enforceable.

The decision in the Durban and Coast Local Division, in Government of the Republic of South Africa (Department of Industries) v Fibre Spinners & Weavers (Pty) Ltd was thus confirmed.

== See also ==
- South African contract law
