= McCann v Halpin =

Irish Supreme Court case

McCann v Halpin [2016] IESC 11
- Coat of arms of Ireland
- Court: Supreme Court of Ireland
- Full case name: McCann v Halpin
- Decided: 11th of March 2016
- Citation: https://www.bailii.org/ie/cases/IESC/2016/S11.html

Case history
- Appealed from: High Court
- Appealed to: Supreme Court

Court membership
- Judges sitting: Laffoy J., Dunne J., Charleton J.

Case opinions
- The High Court judge ruled that the phrase "close of business" meant 4 p.m. and that IBRC shut down every day at 4 p.m. The court also agreed that the receiver had to wait a while before they could carry out their task, dismissing the appellants' appeal against the Possession Order.
- Decision by: Justice Laffoy

Keywords
- Constitution

McCann v Halpin [2016] IESC 11, is a reported Irish Supreme Court case decision concerning the close of business hours. It was decided that 10am to 4pm means "close of business." It was also decided that the rule of construction does not apply because there is no uncertainty. This case, defined the close of business hours and made it clear that the rule of construction should be used in letters of demands or contracts.

== Background ==
Before the receiver was chosen, the Irish Bank Resolution Corporation (IBRC) sent a letter of demand that said payment could be made through an electronic transfer or a bank draft to the right bank account. The letter of demand said:

If payment is not made by the end of business on February 17, 2012, we reserve the right to enforce any security given to us to secure the facilities made available under the Offer Letters, to take all actions allowed by the said security (including, but not limited to, appointing a receiver), and to take any other steps we are legally allowed to take to recover all money owed to us.

The deed of appointment of the receiver was on February 17, 2012, at 4 p.m.

=== High Court ===
In the High Court, the receiver said that the person who had borrowed the money never seemed likely to be able to pay it back. This included meeting with the people who had borrowed the money earlier in the day and making it clear that they could not pay it back. However, the borrower said that the letter of demand was only extended until 4 p.m., which was not when the business day for this company ended. This means that the wrong person was put in charge. The ruling High Court judge said that when the relationship between the bank and the customer was set up, the meaning of the term "close of business" was not left open to interpretation, and that the borrower in this case was in the wrong. "Close of business" in this case meant that the bank was closed. From 10 am to 4 pm, the bank was open. In his statement about this issue, the judge said that the term "close of business" should be taken to mean the end of the business day for banks. The judge also said that expert evidence is not needed to know that banks are usually open from 10 am to 4 pm. If money needs to be at the bank by the end of the day, that could mean no later than 4 p.m.

== Holding of the Supreme Court ==
The borrower's only ground to appeal was based on whether or not the receiver was legitimately appointed to the case. The first thing the borrowers said was that "close of business" had to do with bank hours and that a bank was always open from 10 to 4. It was also argued that since the letter of demand said the money was due at the end of business, it wasn't due at or before the time that was thought to be the end of business. This meant that the receiver couldn't be chosen until after 4 p.m. Lawyers for the appellants also said that, according to contra proferentem rules of construction, the letter of demand should be interpreted against the person who received it if it wasn't clear what it said.

The court decided that the phrase "close of business" was used correctly and meant 4 o'clock. They said that the borrowers couldn't disagree with this issue by referencing a law. So, the court took the phrase to mean what the receiver meant it to mean. People also thought that IBRC shut down every day at 4 p.m. and that all of their customers knew this. Since the appellant used this business, it made sense for the court to think this was what both sides agreed to. The court agreed with the appellant that, since the receiver in this case said they would be appointed when the account closed, they couldn't act right away after the account closed and had to wait a while before they could carry out their task.

As the court already dismissed the Appellants' appeal against the order made in the Section 316 proceedings and found that the Receiver was validly appointed as Receiver over Elektron Holdings Limited's assets, it was decided that this appeal against the Possession Order was dismissed.
