= Hotchkiss v. National City Bank of New York =

1911 U.S. Federal Court case regarding contracts

Hotchkiss v. National City Bank of N.Y.
- Court: United States District Court for the Southern District of New York
- Full case name: Hotchkiss v. National City Bank of N.Y.
- Decided: 1911
- Citation: 200 F. 287 (S.D.N.Y. 1911)

Court membership
- Judge sitting: Judge Learned Hand

Case opinions
- Opinion by Judge Learned Hand
- Decision by: Judge Learned Hand

Keywords
- Contract law; Objective Theory of Contracts; Promise; Intent; Learned Hand

Hotchkiss v. National City Bank of N.Y., 200 F. 287, 293 (S.D.N.Y. 1911) was a landmark case in contract law articulating the Objective Theory of Contracts and dealing with the meaning of a promise in a contract. To wit, Judge Learned Hand opined: "A contract has, strictly speaking, nothing to do with the personal, or individual, intent of the parties. A contract is an obligation attached by the mere force of law to certain acts of the parties, usually words, which ordinarily accompany and represent a known intent. If, however, it were proved by twenty bishops that either party when he used the words intended something else than the usual meaning which the law imposes on them, he would still be held, unless there were mutual mistake or something else of the sort."

== See also ==
- Lucy v. Zehmer
- Judge Learned Hand
- Contracts
- Smith v. Hughes

== External links and sources ==
- WordPress.com: Briefs for Contracts with JJ White
