= Freedom of contract =

Process by which parties form agreements

Freedom of contract is the principle according to which individuals and groups may form contracts without government restrictions. This is opposed to government regulations such as minimum-wage laws, competition laws, economic sanctions, restrictions on price fixing, or restrictions on contracting with undocumented workers. Freedom to contract underpins laissez-faire economics and is a cornerstone of free-market libertarianism. The proponents of the concept believe that through "freedom of contract", individuals possess a general freedom to choose with whom to contract, whether to contract or not, and on which terms to contract.

== History ==
English law professor Patrick Atiyah argues that the idea that contracts could be based on consent was almost entirely absent in legal circles before 1770. Atiyah dates the "rise" of the concept to the period after 1770, he calls that period from 1770 to 1870 "the age of Freedom of Contract", and he sees its "decline and fall" occurring from 1870 onwards.

Henry James Sumner Maine proposed that social structures evolve from roles derived from social status to those based on contractual freedom. A status system establishes obligations and relationships by birth, but a contract presumes that the individuals are free and equal. Modern libertarianism, such as that advanced by Robert Nozick, sees freedom of contract as the expression of the independent decisions of separate individuals pursuing their own interests under a "minimal state."

== United States ==
In the United States, the right to make and enforce contracts is embedded in Title 42 of the US Code. The term "make and enforce contracts" includes "the making, performance, modification, and termination of contracts, and the enjoyment of all benefits, privileges, terms, and conditions of the contractual relationship".

=== Lochner v. New York ===
In 1902, a New York baker named Joseph Lochner was fined for violating a state law limiting the number of hours his employees could work. He sued the state on the grounds that he was denied his right to due process. Lochner claimed that he had the right to freely contract with his employees and that the state had unfairly interfered with this. In 1905, the Supreme Court ruled that the New York state statute imposing a limit on hours of work violated the United States Constitution's Due Process Clause. Rufus Wheeler Peckham wrote for the majority: "Under that provision no state shall deprive any person of life, liberty, or property without due process of law. The right to purchase or to sell labor is part of the liberty protected by this amendment."

Writing in dissent, Oliver Wendell Holmes Jr. accused the majority of basing its decision on laissez-faire ideology. He believed that it was making law based on economics rather than interpreting the constitution. He believed that "Liberty of Contract" did not exist and that it was not intended in the Constitution.

=== Afterward ===
In his "Liberty of Contract" (1909), Roscoe Pound critiqued freedom-of-contract laws by laying out case after case in which labor rights were struck down by state and federal Supreme Courts. Pound argued the courts' rulings were "simply wrong" from the standpoint of common law and "even from that of a sane individualism" (482). Pound further compared the situation of labor legislation in his time to common opinion of usury and that the two were "of the same type" (484). Pound lamented that the legacy of such "academic" and "artificial" judicial rulings for liberty of contract engendered a "lost respect for the courts" but predicted a "bright" future for labor legislation (486–487).

The Supreme Court applied the liberty of contract doctrine sporadically over the next three decades but generally upheld reformist legislation as being within the states' police power. In 1937 the Court reversed its view in the case West Coast Hotel Co. v. Parrish. In that case the court upheld a Washington state law setting a minimum wage.

== United Kingdom ==
In the late 19th century, the English judiciary espoused "freedom of contract" as a generally applicable feature of public policy, best expressed in Printing and Numerical Registering Co v Sampson by Sir George Jessel MR. In the later 20th century, the view of the common law had changed completely. In George Mitchell (Chesterhall) Ltd v Finney Lock Seeds Ltd, Lord Denning MR compared "freedom of contract" with oppression of the weak, as he outlined the development the law had undergone.

The heyday of freedom of contract

None of you nowadays will remember the trouble we had – when I was called to the Bar – with exemption clauses. They were printed in small print on the back of tickets and order forms and invoices. They were contained in catalogues or timetables. They were held to be binding on any person who took them without objection. No one ever did object. He never read them or knew what was in them. No matter how unreasonable they were, he was bound. All this was done in the name of "freedom of contract". But the freedom was all on the side of the big concern which had the use of the printing press. No freedom for the little man who took the ticket or order form or invoice. The big concern said, "Take it or leave it." The little man had no option but to take it. The big concern could and did exempt itself from liability in its own interest without regard to the little man. It got away with it time after time. When the courts said to the big concern, "You must put it in clear words", the big concern had no hesitation in doing so. It knew well that the little man would never read the exemption clauses or understand them.

It was a bleak winter for our law of contract. It is illustrated by two cases, Thompson v. London, Midland and Scottish Railway Co. [1930] 1 K.B. 41 (in which there was exemption from liability, not on the ticket, but only in small print at the back of the timetable, and the company were held not liable) and L'Estrange v. F. Graucob Ltd. [1934] 2 K.B. 394 (in which there was complete exemption in small print at the bottom of the order form, and the company were held not liable).

The secret weapon

Faced with this abuse of power – by the strong against the weak – by the use of the small print of the conditions – the judges did what they could to put a curb upon it. They still had before them the idol, "freedom of contract". They still knelt down and worshipped it, but they concealed under their cloaks a secret weapon. They used it to stab the idol in the back. This weapon was called "the true construction of the contract". They used it with great skill and ingenuity. They used it so as to depart from the natural meaning of the words of the exemption clause and to put upon them a strained and unnatural construction. In case after case, they said that the words were not strong enough to give the big concern exemption from liability; or that in the circumstances the big concern was not entitled to rely on the exemption clause. If a ship deviated from the contractual voyage, the owner could not rely on the exemption clause. If a warehouseman stored the goods in the wrong warehouse, he could not pray in aid the limitation clause. If the seller supplied goods different in kind from those contracted for, he could not rely on any exemption from liability. If a shipowner delivered goods to a person without production of the bill of lading, he could not escape responsibility by reference to an exemption clause. In short, whenever the wide words – in their natural meaning – would give rise to an unreasonable result, the judges either rejected them as repugnant to the main purpose of the contract, or else cut them down to size in order to produce a reasonable result. This is illustrated by these cases in the House of Lords: Glynn v. Margetson & Co. [1893] A.C. 351; London and North Western Railway Co. v. Neilson [1922] 2 A.C. 263; Cunard Steamship Co. Ltd. v. Buerger [1927] A.C. 1; and by Canada Steamship Lines Ltd v The King [1952] A.C. 192 and Sze Hai Tong Bank Ltd. v. Rambler Cycle Co. Ltd. [1959] A.C. 576 in the Privy Council; and innumerable cases in the Court of Appeal, culminating in Levison v. Patent Steam Carpet Cleaning Co. Ltd. [1978] Q.B. 69. But when the clause was itself reasonable and gave rise to a reasonable result, the judges upheld it; at any rate, when the clause did not exclude liability entirely but only limited it to a reasonable amount. So where goods were deposited in a cloakroom or sent to a laundry for cleaning, it was quite reasonable for the company to limit their liability to a reasonable amount, having regard to the small charge made for the service. These are illustrated by Gibaud v. Great Eastern Railway Co. [1921] 2 K.B. 426; Alderslade v Hendon Laundry Ltd [1945] K.B. 189 and Gillespie Bros. & Co. Ltd. v Roy Bowles Transport Ltd. [1973] Q.B. 400.

== Australia ==
In Australia, the principle of "Freedom of Contract" is integral to its legal system, mirroring the autonomy found in contract laws globally. Central to this is the Australian Consumer Law, which safeguards fair dealings and transparent terms in contractual agreements. This law ensures a balance between the freedom of parties to negotiate and enter into contracts, and the protection of consumers from unfair or deceptive practices. It highlights the importance of equitable contract terms, particularly in safeguarding the interests of consumers and small businesses, in line with Australia's commitment to fair trading and consumer rights. The history of "Freedom of Contract" in Australia has evolved significantly over time. Initially, this principle was heavily influenced by English common law, emphasizing the importance of autonomy and mutual agreement in contract formation. Over the years, the Australian legal system has refined and adapted these concepts to address local needs and circumstances, particularly focusing on consumer protection and fair trading practices. This evolution reflects Australia's commitment to balancing individual freedoms in contract negotiations with the protection of societal interests, especially in terms of consumer rights and equitable dealings.

== Georgia ==
In Georgia, 319th Article of Civil Code of Georgia states, that "Subjects of private law shall be free to enter into contracts and determine their contents within the scope of the law. They may also conclude contracts that are not prescribed by law but do not contravene it. If, for the protection of the essential interests of society or a person, the validity of a contract depends upon the permission of the state, then a separate law shall govern the matter."

== Law and economics ==
In economics, the freedom of contract has been studied in the field of contract theory. According to the Coase Theorem, the freedom of contract is beneficial in the absence of transaction costs. When two rational parties voluntarily enter into a contract, they must be (at least weakly) better off than in the absence of the contract. The parties will agree on a contract that maximizes the total surplus that they can generate. Hence, restrictions on the class of enforceable contracts can only reduce the total surplus. Yet, prohibiting certain contracts can be beneficial when there are transaction costs. For example, Spier and Whinston (1995) have shown that not enforcing a contract between two parties can be desirable when the contract has negative external effects on a third party (which does not participate in the contract due to transaction costs). It has also been argued that the presence of asymmetric information can make restrictions on the freedom of contract desirable, since such restrictions can prevent inefficient distortions due to signalling and screening.^{,} Similarly, when there are transaction costs due to moral hazard problems, restrictions on the freedom of contract can be welfare-enhancing. Furthermore, it can be desirable not to enforce certain contracts when agents are susceptible to cognitive biases. Finally, an important problem is whether contractual parties should have the freedom to restrict their own freedom to modify their contract in the future. Schmitz (2005) and Davis (2006) argue that it can be beneficial not to enforce non-renegotiation clauses in contracts.^{,}

== See also ==
- Bargaining
- Bargaining power
- Coercive monopoly
- English contract law
- Free contract
- Inequality of bargaining power
- Information asymmetry
- Just price
- Laesio enormis
- Lochner era
- Market power
- Monopoly
- Monopsony
- Patriarchal bargain
- United States contract law
