= Free contract =

In economics, free contract is the concept that people may decide what agreements they want to enter into.

A contract may be described as free when it is free from force or fraud.

== See also ==
- Freedom of contract
