= Fairfax Luxmoore =

British barrister, judge & English rugby union player

The Right Honourable Sir Fairfax Luxmoore
- Luxmoore, in 1935

Lord Justice of Appeal
- In office 11 October 1938 – 25 September 1944
- Preceded by: None
- Succeeded by: Sir Fergus Morton

Justice of the High Court
- In office 11 February 1929 – 11 October 1938
- Preceded by: Sir Thomas Tomlin

Personal details
- Born: Arthur Fairfax Charles Coryndon Luxmoore; 27 February 1876 Kilburn, London
- Died: 28 September 1944 (aged 68) Hammersmith, London
- Children: 5
- Education: Jesus College, Cambridge

Sir Arthur Fairfax Charles Coryndon Luxmoore (27 February 1876 – 25 September 1944) was a British barrister and judge who sat as a Lord Justice of Appeal

== Life ==
Luxmoore was born on 27 February 1876 to Arthur Coryndon Hansler Luxmoore, an artist, and his wife Katherine. After studying at The King's School, Canterbury he matriculated to Jesus College, Cambridge, which he represented in rugby and cricket. Called to the bar by Lincoln's Inn in 1899, he took a place in the chambers of George Cave after graduation in 1900.

After playing for the England national rugby union team against both Scotland and Wales he threw himself into his work as a barrister, and built up a successful practice. In 1919, he applied to become a King's Counsel, and was accepted. He became a Bencher of Lincoln's Inn in 1922. In 1924 he contested Isle of Thanet as a Liberal candidate. He was sworn in as JP for Kent in 1927.

In February 1929 was knighted and made a judge of the Chancery Division of the High Court of Justice. A well-respected and hard working judge as well as the senior puisne Chancery judge, Luxmoore was promoted to the Court of Appeal in October 1938 on the creation of a third division of the Court of Appeal, and made a privy councillor.

Although not normally delivering the leading judgment, his secondary judgments and dissenting judgments proved valuable, and dissenting judgments were several times upheld by the House of Lords.

In 1943, he was made Treasurer of Lincoln's Inn, but in March was taken ill suffering from overwork. He returned to the Bench, but suffered a heart attack on 25 September 1944 and died.
