= Frederick E Rose (London) Ltd v William H Pim Junior & Co Ltd =

Rose v Pim
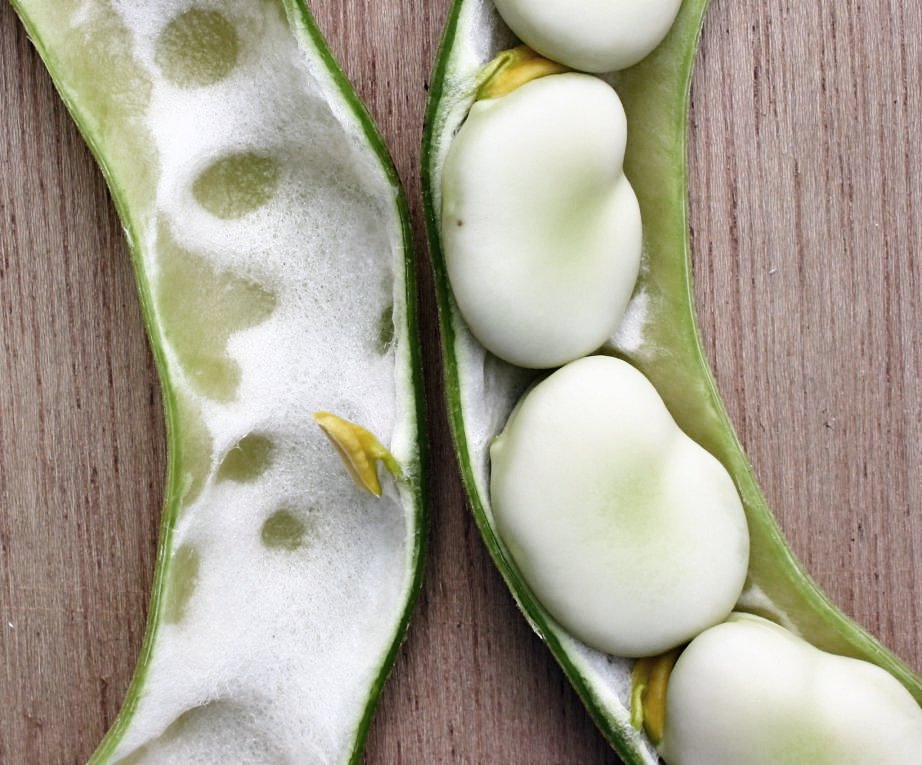
- Court: Court of Appeal
- Decided: 6 March 1953
- Citations: [1953] 2 QB 450 [1951] 2 All ER 739

Court membership
- Judges sitting: Denning LJ, Singleton LJ and Morris LJ

Keywords
- Rectification

Frederick E Rose (London) Ltd v William H Pim Junior & Co Ltd [1953] 2 QB 450 is an English contract law case concerning the rectification of contractual documents and the interpretation of contracts in English law.

== Facts ==
On October 26, 1950, Frederick E Rose Ltd was asked to supply "up to five hundred tons of Moroccan horsebeans described here as feveroles" to their associated company based in Egypt. A representative from Rose asked a representative from the Algerian supplier, William H Pim Junior & Co Ltd, what feveroles were. The representative replied that "feveroles meant horsebeans." They contracted for the supply of "horsebeans" with both parties believing that horsebeans was a literal translation of "feveroles". However, there were, in fact, three sizes of beans grown in North Africa: feves (the largest), feveroles (medium sized) and fevettes (the smallest). The English term "horsebeans" covered all three sizes. Rose was supplied with feves, which are larger and cheaper than feveroles. The Egyptian buyers brought a claim of damages, since the wrong type of beans were delivered, and Rose in turn brought a claim against Pim. Rose sought to rectify the contract to replace "horsebean" with "feverole.

== Judgment ==
Denning LJ, Singleton LJ and Morris LJ held that, because both parties had agreed on horsebeans, and the contract was not void for mistake, the contractual document could not be rectified in this instance. Denning LJ said that this was not a claim for rectification, because "rectification is concerned with contracts and documents, not with intentions." In order to get rectification, it is necessary to show that the parties were in complete agreement on the terms of their contract, but by error wrote them down incorrectly. He said that there might have been a case for misrepresentation or mistake, but that case was not pleaded and was very different from rectification. He added that they probably should not have dropped the claim for collateral warranty that the beans would comply with a demand for feveroles. Since the contract could not be rectified, Rose (and their Egyptian buyer) could not, thus, claim that the wrong beans had been delivered and thus claim damages.

== See also ==
- Interpreting contracts in English law
- Hartog v Colin & Shields [1939] 3 All ER 566
