= Thake v Maurice =

- Court: Queen's Bench Division (High Court)
- Citation: [1986] QB 644

Keywords
- Implied term, objectivity, interpretation

Thake v Maurice [1986] QB 644 is an English contract law case, concerning the standard of care that must be exercised by surgeons in performing operations.

== Facts ==
Mr Thake was a railway guard and they were not financially comfortable with five children already (two grown up), living in a three-bedroom council house. Mrs Thake wanted to be sterilised, but the NHS waiting list was long and they could not afford to go private.

Their doctor suggested Mr Thake have a vasectomy and arranged for them to see Mr Maurice. He did not advise Mrs Thake that there was a small chance that after a vasectomy there could be recanalisation and Mr Thake would become fertile again.

Mrs Thake ignored the signs of pregnancy because she thought it had worked, and then only realised when she was five months pregnant. She wanted an abortion, but it was too late, and a healthy child was born, Samantha. They sued in contract and tort for damages.

== Judgment ==
The Court of Appeal held that a normal, reasonable person knows that medical operations are not always successful, and that simply by promising to do an operation, there is no promise for success. Speaking about what an ordinary person would think, Nourse LJ said "it does seem to me to be reasonable to credit him with the more general knowledge that in medical science all things, or nearly all things are uncertain." All agreed that as a matter of tort, failure to warn about a small risk of failure amounted to a breach of the duty of care between surgeon and patient. The measure of tort damages were less than potential contract damages of £2500, being only £1500 to take account of the fact that she did not have the pain of an abortion. But there would be no damages for breach of contract, to put the patient in the position as if the contract had been successful, or in other words, to reimburse for the expenses of bringing up the child.

Kerr LJ concluded his judgment as follows. He referred to Lord Denning MR in Greaves & Co (Contractors) Ltd v Baynham Meikle & Partners when he said, “The surgeon does not warrant that he will cure the patient.”

That was said in the context of treatment or an operation designed to cure, not in the context of anything in the nature of an amputation. The facts of the present case are obviously extremely unusual, but I do not see why the judge's and my conclusion on these unusual facts should be viewed by surgeons with alarm, as mentioned by the judge. If the defendant had given his usual warning, the objective analysis of what he conveyed would have been quite different, and it is also to be noted that in the second consent form referred to by French J in his judgment in Eyre v Measday (unreported), 3 July 1984, the wording included the following

The purpose of the operation is to render me sterile and, although it is nearly 100 per cent. successful, I appreciate that this cannot be guaranteed. It may not be possible to reverse the operation.

Accordingly, I would uphold the judge’s conclusion that the plaintiffs succeed in their claim that the revival of Mr. Thake’s fertility gave rise to a breach of contract on the part of the defendant.

Neill LJ said,

It is the common experience of mankind that the results of medical treatment are to some extent unpredictable and that any treatment may be affected by the special characteristics of the particular patient. It has been well said that “the dynamics of the human body of each individual are themselves individual.”… The reasonable man would have expected the defendant to exercise all the proper skill and care of a surgeon in that speciality; he would not in my view have expected the defendant to give a guarantee of 100 per cent. success.

So stressing that the operation was ‘irreversible’ did not amount to giving a guarantee that it would work, no binding promise.

== See also ==
- Interpreting contracts in English law
