= Printing and Numerical Registering Co v Sampson =

English contract law and patent case

- Court: Court of Appeal
- Citation: (1875) 19 Eq 462

Keywords
- Freedom of contract

Printing and Numerical Registering Co v Sampson (1875) 19 Eq 462 is an English contract law and patent case. It is most notable for strong advocacy of the principle of freedom of contract put forward by Sir George Jessel MR. The strict principles expressed were mostly abandoned over the 20th century, as summarised by Lord Denning MR in George Mitchell (Chesterhall) Ltd v Finney Lock Seeds Ltd.

== Facts ==
The Printing and Numerical Registering Co sued Sampson for breaching a patent agreement. Sampson and other shareholders in the company had made a contract to sell "all future patent rights" to the company. Sampson began using the information covered by the patent in his own business. The company sued. Sampson argued his agreement should be void and be considered as being contrary to public policy because it lasted for so long.

== Judgment ==
Sir George Jessel MR held that the contract was valid and remarked,

Now, it was said on the part of the Defendant, that such a contract as that which I have mentioned, a contract by which an inventor agrees to sell what he may invent, or acquire a patent for before he has invented it, is against public policy, and it was said to be against public policy, because it would discourage inventions; that if a man knows that he cannot obtain any pecuniary benefit from his invention, having already received the price for it, he will not invent, or if he does invent will keep it secret, and will not take out a patent. It must not be forgotten that you are not to extend arbitrarily those rules which say that a given contract is void as being against public policy, because if there is one thing which more than another public policy requires it is that men of full age and competent understanding shall have the utmost liberty of contracting, and that their contracts when entered into freely and voluntarily shall be held sacred and shall be enforced by Courts of justice. Therefore, you have this paramount public policy to consider—that you are not lightly to interfere with this freedom of contract. Now, there is no doubt public policy may say that a contract to commit a crime, or a contract to give a reward to another to commit a crime, is necessarily void. The decisions have gone further, and contracts to commit an immoral offence, or to give money or reward to another to commit an immoral offence, or to induce another to do something against the general rules of morality, though far more indefinite than the previous class, have always been held to be void. I should be sorry to extend the doctrine much further. I do not say there are no other cases to which it does apply; but I should be sorry to extend it much further. However, I am satisfied there is no reason for so extending it in this case. In the first place, it is assumed that a man will not invent without pecuniary reward. Experience shews us that that must not be taken as an absolute truth. Some of the greatest inventions, which have been of the most benefit to mankind, have been invented by persons who have given their inventions freely to the world. Again it is supposed that a man who has obtained money for the future products of his brain will not be ready to produce these products. That must not be assumed. Nothing is more common in intellectual pursuits than for men to sell beforehand the future intellectual product before it is made, or even conceived. Does any one imagine that it is against public policy for an artist to sell the picture which he has never painted or designed, or for the sculptor to sell the statue, the subject of which is to be hereafter given to him, or for the author to sell the copyright of the book, the title of which is even as yet unknown, or, more than that, that a contributor to a periodical may agree that he will devote himself to the exclusive service of a certain periodical for a given period, for a given reward? These examples are, to my mind, entirely repugnant to the argument that there is any public policy in prohibiting such contracts. On the contrary, public policy is the other way. It encourages the poor, needy, and struggling author or artist. It enables him to pursue his avocations, because people rely upon his honour and good faith, and the ordinary practice of mankind; and it will provide for him the means beforehand which, if the law prohibited such a contract, he could not otherwise obtain. This appears to me to apply as much to a patent invention as to any other subject which the intellect can produce. A man who is a needy and struggling inventor may well agree either for a present payment in money down, or for an annual payment, to put his intellectual gifts at the service of a purchaser. I see, therefore, not only no rule of public policy against it, but a rule of public policy for it, because it may enable such a man in comparative ease and affluence to devote his attention to scientific research, whereas, if such a contract were prohibited he would be compelled to apply himself to some menial or mechanical or lower calling, in order to gain a livelihood. I think, therefore, if the question were to be debated solely on those considerations, such a contract as this could not be deemed against public policy, and I say that because this argument is one which is frequently used, and when it is brought forward deserves, as it has received from me on the present occasion, the most attentive consideration.

== See also ==
- English contract law
