= Lucy v. Zehmer =

1954 Virginia Supreme Court case regarding contract language

- Court: Supreme Court of Virginia
- Full case name: W. O. Lucy and J. C. Lucy v. A. H. Zehmer and Ida S. Zehmer
- Decided: November 22, 1954
- Citation: 196 Va. 493; 84 S.E.2d 516; 1954 Va. LEXIS 244

Case history
- Prior actions: Appeal from a decree of the Circuit Court of Dinwiddie County. Hon J. G. Jefferson, Jr., judge presiding.

Holding
- A person cannot set up that he was merely jesting when his conduct and words would warrant a reasonable person in believing that he intended a real agreement.

Court membership
- Chief judge: John W. Eggleston
- Associate judges: Kennon C. Whittle, Willis D. Miller, Lemuel F. Smith, Archibald C. Buchanan

Case opinions
- Majority: Buchanan, joined by unanimous

Lucy v. Zehmer, 196 Va. 493; 84 S.E.2d 516 (1954) was a court case in the Supreme Court of Virginia about the enforceability of a contract based on outward appearance of the agreement. It is commonly taught in first-year contract law classes at American law schools.

== Facts ==
Defendant A. H. Zehmer and his wife, Ida S. Zehmer, owned a tract of land of 471.6 acres (190.8 ha) in Dinwiddie County, Virginia, known as the Ferguson Farm. Plaintiff W. O. Lucy had known Zehmer for many years and had previously expressed interest in purchasing the farm. Some years prior to the case, Zehmer had orally agreed to sell the farm to Lucy, but later reconsidered and declined to complete the sale.

On December 20, 1952, Lucy entered the restaurant owned by Zehmer with a bottle of whiskey in his hand. Lucy and Zehmer consumed a significant quantity of the whiskey and discussed the possible sale of the farm. Zehmer wrote on the back of the restaurant's receipt stating, "We hereby agree to sell to W. O. Lucy the Ferguson Farm complete for $50,000.00, title satisfactory to buyer". The note was signed by Zehmer and his wife.

Zehmer later alleged that his wife had initially balked at his request that she sign the instrument, but she relented when Zehmer assured her that his intent to sell the farm was merely in jest.

The next day, Lucy spoke to his brother, J. C. Lucy, about the purchase, and he hired an attorney to examine the title. After the attorney assured Lucy that the title was clear, he wrote a letter to Zehmer asking when he intended to close the deal. In his reply, Zehmer insisted that he had never intended to sell the farm and that the note signed by him and his wife was written in jest, consistent with the jovial atmosphere and drunken camaraderie the parties were sharing that evening.

Zehmer claimed on the witness stand that the circumstances were such that Lucy should have known he was too inebriated to agree to the sale. Depositions were taken, and the decree appealed from was entered. It held that the complainants had failed to establish their right to specific performance, and it dismissed their bill.

== Decision ==
Archibald C. Buchanan, who served on the Supreme Court of Virginia since 1946, wrote for the unanimous court decision, holding that the record suggested that Zehmer was not intoxicated to the point of being unable to comprehend the nature and consequences of the instrument he executed. The circumstances surrounding the transaction were such that Lucy was justified in believing that it was a serious business transaction, rather than a mere jest. On the latter point, Buchanan quoted from the Restatement (First) of Contracts:

The mental assent of the parties is not requisite for the formation of a contract. If the words or other acts of one of the parties have but one reasonable meaning, his undisclosed intention is immaterial except when an unreasonable meaning which he attaches to his manifestations is known to the other party.

Buchanan further held that specific performance was the proper remedy for the plaintiff.

== Criticism ==
Because the court's opinion relied on the external acts of the parties and not their intentions, the opinion followed the objective theory of contract formation. Although the case is a mainstay of American legal education, the facts and the accuracy of this theory have been challenged by academic legal commentators. Specifically, commentators argue that the court failed to take into account the history of shady deals that Lucy had left in his wake in an effort to buy properties rich in natural resources at unfairly low prices and then sell them for extremely high profit.

Additionally, the objective method overlooked the fact that Lucy was one of many aggressive middlemen working for Virginia's pulp-and-paper industry. Analysis of the historical record of the transaction raises substantial questions about the objective method's ability to capture relevant factual and contextual background.
