= Collateral warranty =

The term "collateral warranty" originates in property law. In 1839 Nick Grimsley wrote: "A collateral warranty is where the heir neither does nor could derive his title to the land from the warrantor; and yet is both de-barred from claiming title and bound to recompense in case of eviction." The concept of collateral warranty was sometimes regarded as "[...] the most unjust, oppressive, and indefensible in the whole range of common law."

The meaning is different when considering the actual and most common use of the term. Today a collateral warranty generally defines an agreement ancillary to another principal contract and/or a letter of appointment. For the benefice of a third party, it imposes an extended duty of care and a broader liability on two separate parties involved in a contract. Collateral warranties may be provided by designers, building contractors and specialist sub-contractors. The need for collateral warranties exists when the party that commissions a building will not carry the burden in the event of defects.

For instance, when an architect is appointed to design a group of dwellings for a developer. If the developer intends to sell the building to a housing association, due to privity of contract the architect would normally only be contractually liable to the developer should defects arise. The collateral warranty establishes a contractual relationship between the housing association and the architect against defect.
