= Yoshimoto v Canterbury Golf International Ltd =

New Zealand legal case appealed to Privy Council

- Court: Privy Council
- Full case name: Hideo Yoshimoto v Canterbury Golf International Ltd
- Decided: 16 July 2002
- Citation: [2004] 1 NZLR 1
- Transcript: Privy Councul judgment

Case history
- Subsequent action: Court of Appeal judgment

Court membership
- Judges sitting: Lord Slynn of Hadley, Lord Nicholls of Birkenhead, Lord Hoffmann, Lord Scott of Foscote, The Rt. Hon. Justice Tipping

Keywords
- Contract construction

Yoshimoto v Canterbury Golf International Ltd [2004] 1 NZLR 1 is a frequently cited case in NZ regarding contract construction.
