= Canada Steamship Lines Ltd v R =

1952 Canadian contract law case

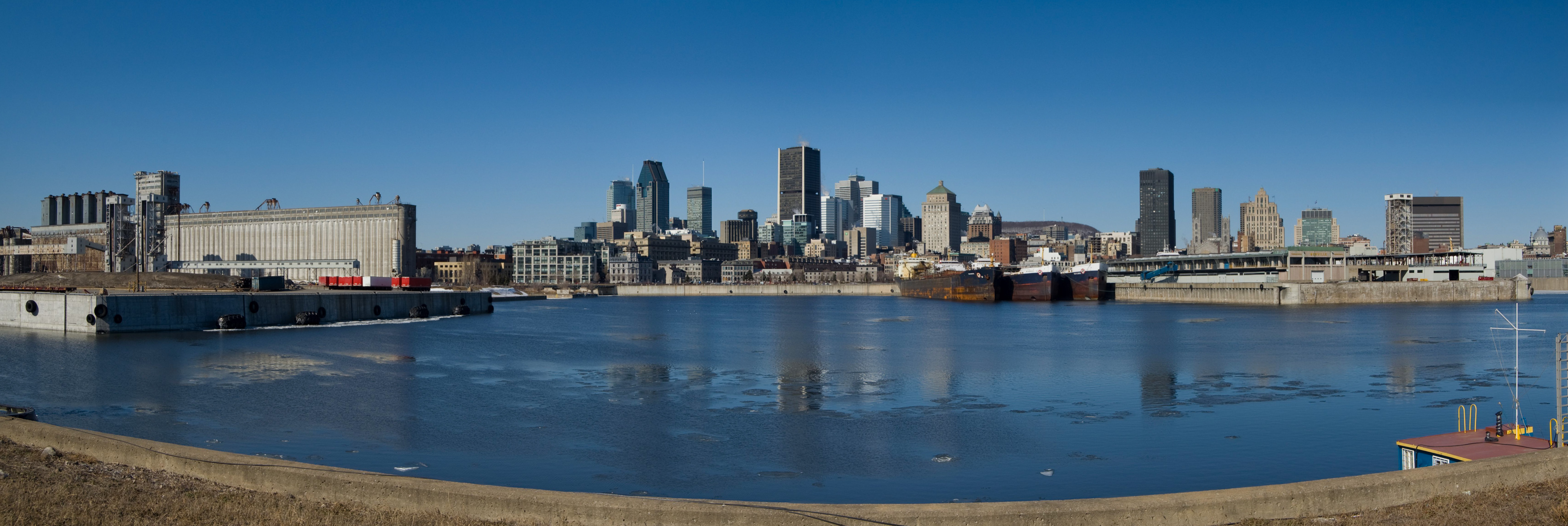
- Old Port of Montreal
- Court: Judicial Committee of the Privy Council
- Decided: 21 January 1952
- Citations: [1952] UKPC 1, [1952] AC 192

Case history
- Appealed from: The King v. Canada SS. Lines, 1950 CanLII 40, [1950] SCR 532 (23 June 1950), Supreme Court (Canada), reversing judgments of Angers J in the Exchequer Court of Canada, [1948] ExCR 635

Court membership
- Judges sitting: Lord Porter; Lord Normand; Lord Morton of Henryton; Lord Asquith of Bishopstone; Lord Cohen

Case opinions
- Decision by: Lord Morton of Henryton

Keywords
- Unfair terms, contra proferentum

Canada Steamship Lines Ltd v R [1952] UKPC 1, also referred to as Canada Steamship Lines Ltd v The King, is a Canadian contract law case, also relevant for English contract law, concerning the interpretation of unfair terms contra proferentem. The case was decided by the Judicial Committee of the Privy Council on appeal from the Supreme Court of Canada, as the cause for appeal arose before the abolition of such appeals in 1949. Although arising in civil law under the Civil Code of Lower Canada, it has been influential in similar cases under English law, but is now recognised as providing "guidelines" rather than an "automatic solution".

== Facts ==
In November 1940, Canada Steamship Lines Ltd (CSL) entered into a Crown lease for a twelve-year term, in which it became a tenant of certain dock property on which was situated a freight shed, on St Gabriel Basin on the Lachine Canal, part of the Port of Montreal. The lease contained the following clauses:

- Clause 7 said "the lessee (ie, CSL) shall not have any claim… for… damage… to… goods… being… in the said shed."
- Clause 8 said the lessor (ie, the Crown) would maintain the said shed at its own cost and expense.
- Clause 17 said "the lessee shall at all times indemnify ... the lessor from and against all claims ... by whomsoever made ... in any manner based upon, occasioned by or attributable to the execution of these presents, or any action taken or things done ... by virtue hereof, or the exercise in any manner of rights arising hereunder."

In May 1944, while trying to keep the shed in repair with an oxy-acetylene torch, an employee started a fire and burned down the shed. According to proper practice he was negligent and should have used a hand drill because sparks flew and lit some cotton bales. $533,584 of goods were destroyed, of which $40,714 belonging to Canada Steamship Lines. The Crown argued that CSL could not sue because clause 7 excluded liability.

== Court rulings ==
=== Exchequer Court of Canada ===
At the Exchequer Court of Canada, Angers J held that the Crown's employees had been negligent and that clause 7 could not be invoked as their negligence amounted to faute lourde (roughly equivalent to gross negligence in common law). For the same reason, he dismissed the third party proceedings instituted by the Crown under clause 17.

=== Supreme Court of Canada ===
On appeal to the Supreme Court of Canada, the Court declared that the finding of negligence by the trial judge could not be disturbed. The Court ruled:

- The intention of the parties to be gathered from the whole of the document was that, as between the lessor and the lessee, the lessor should be exempt under both clauses 7 and 17 from liability founded on negligence (Locke J dissenting as to clause 7).
- The conduct of the Crown's employees did not amount to faute lourde.

CSL appealed the ruling to the Privy Council.

=== Privy Council ===
Appeal was allowed against the SCC judgment. Lord Morton of Henryton said that clause 7 did not exclude negligence liability in clear enough terms and clause 17 was ambiguous and would be construed against the Crown. The Crown could realistically be said to have been strictly liable for damage to the goods (e.g. by breach of obligation to keep the shed in repair) and therefore negligence should not be covered. In that regard, he set out the following principles for courts to use in considering such clauses:

1. if a clause expressly excludes liability for negligence (or an appropriate synonym ) then effect is given to that. If not,
2. one should ask whether the words are wide enough to exclude negligence and if there is doubt, that is resolved against the one relying on the clause. If that is satisfied, then
3. one should ask whether the clause could cover some alternative liability other than for negligence, and if it can, it covers that.

In this case, another form of liability for damage was strict liability, and so the exclusion clause did not work to cover negligence.

== See also ==
- English contract law
- Unfair Contract Terms Act 1977
- Unfair Contract Terms Bill
- Interpreting contracts in English law
- Hollier v Rambler Motors (AMC) Ltd [1972] 1 All ER 399
