= Gillespie Bros & Co Ltd v Roy Bowles Transport Ltd =

1973 English contract law case

Gillespie Bros Ltd v Roy Bowles Ltd
- Court: Court of Appeal
- Citation: [1973] 1 QB 400

Keywords
- Contract

Gillespie Bros & Co Ltd v Roy Bowles Transport Ltd [1973] 1 QB 400 is an English contract law case, concerning the interpretation of unfair contract terms.

== Facts ==
Rennie Hogg Ltd hired a van and driver from Roy Bowles (the ‘carrier’) on a monthly basis under the Road Haulage Association’s Conditions of Carriage 1967. Clause 3(4) said Rennie Hogg would ‘keep the carrier indemnified against all claims or demands whatsoever by whomsoever made in excess of the liability of the carrier under these conditions’ and clause 12 limited the liability to the value of one consignment. Gillespie Bros had three gold watched transported by Rennie Hogg, but they were stolen at Heathrow, on the way between Switzerland and Jamaica, out the back of the van while the driver was signing for it in the warehouse. Gillespie Bros brought a claim against Roy Bowles.

Browne J awarded £1008 in damages, finding that Roy Bowles employee was negligent. Roy Bowles brought proceedings to be indemnified under clause 3(4) but it was held that the exemption clause could not cover their own negligence.

== Judgment ==
Court of Appeal held that ‘all claims or demands’ and the reference to ‘whatsoever’ should mean that the exemption was applicable between the parties. The clause should be construed as suggested in Canada Steamship, but here the words were wide enough to cover negligence. Lord Denning MR said the following.

judges have… time after time, sanctioned a departure from the ordinary meaning. They have done it under the guise of ‘construing’ the clause. They assume that the party cannot have intended anything so unreasonable. So they construe the clause ‘strictly’. They cut down the ordinary meaning of the words and reduce them to reasonable proportions. They use all their skill and art to that end.

Buckley LJ added the following.

It is, however, a fundamental consideration in the construction of contracts of this kind that it is inherently improbable that one party to the contract should intend to absolve the other party from the consequences of the latter's own negligence. The intention to do so must therefore be made perfectly clear, for otherwise the court will conclude that the exempted party was only to be free from liability in respect of damage occasioned by causes other than negligence for which he is answerable.

Orr LJ concurred.

== See also ==
- English contract law
