= Edinburgh Law Review =

- Discipline: Law
- Language: English

Publication details
- History: 1996–present
- Publisher: Edinburgh University Press (Scotland)
- Frequency: Triannual

Standard abbreviations
- ISO 4: Edinb. Law Rev.

Indexing
- ISSN: 1364-9809 (print); 1755-1692 (web)

Links
- Journal homepage

Edinburgh Law Review is a triannual academic journal published by Edinburgh University Press in January, May, and September of each year. It was founded in 1996 and focuses on international as well as Scots law.
