= Smith v Hughes =

English contract law case

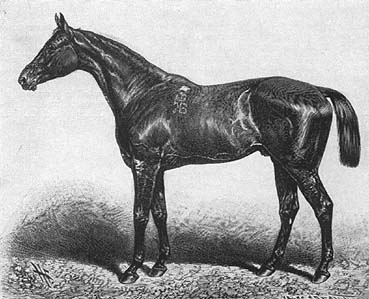
- Court: Queen's Bench
- Decided: 6 June 1871
- Citation: (1870-71) LR 6 QB 597; [1861-73] All ER Rep 632; (1871) 19 WR 1059

Case opinions
- Cockburn CJ, Blackburn J and Hannen J

Keywords
- unilateral mistake, objectivity, sale by sample, failure to assess sample

Smith v Hughes (1871) LR 6 QB 597 is an English contract law case. In it, Justice Blackburn set out his classic statement of the objective interpretation of people's conduct (acceptance by conduct) when entering into a contract. The case regarded a mistake made by Mr. Hughes, a horse trainer, who bought a quantity of oats that were the same as a sample he had been shown. However, Hughes had misidentified the kind of oats: his horse could not eat them, and he refused to pay for them. Smith, the oat supplier, sued for Hughes to complete the sale as agreed. The court sided with Smith, as he provided the oats Hughes agreed to buy. That Hughes made a mistake was his own fault, as he had not been misled by Smith. Since Smith had made no fault, there was no mutual mistake, and the sale contract was still valid.

The case stands for the narrow proposition that in a commercial sale by sample (following sample) where the goods conform to the sample shown, the court will mindful of the principle of caveat emptor ("buyer beware") look more to objective than subjective consensus ad idem ("meeting of the minds"). Its wider proposition, not directly relevant to the facts of the case, and later substantially reduced, was that a consumer buying an item, such as "a horse", without a representation or warranty (any seller's statement or special term as to its condition) making his own assessment which "turns out unsound" cannot avoid, that is seek to obtain a refund on, the contract — see for example the largely consolidatory Consumer Rights Act 2015.

== Facts ==
Mr. Hughes was a racehorse trainer. Mr. Smith, who was a farmer, brought him a sample of his oats, of which Hughes then ordered forty to fifty quarters at a fixed price. (Note: 34 shillings a quarter) Sixteen quarters were sent to start with. But when they arrived, Hughes said they were not the oats he thought they would be. He had wanted old oats (which are the only ones racehorses can eat), and he was getting new oats (also known as green oats). In fact, Smith's sample was of green oats. Hughes refused to pay and Smith sued for damages for breach of contract, for the amount of oats delivered and still to be delivered. Later questions were put in this civil matter to jury (a procedure today largely abolished).

The jury convened locally at a County Court of Surrey, at Epsom. They initially found for Mr. Hughes that there was a mistake on his part. They were directed by the judge that if Mr. Hughes was under a mistake about the oats (thinking they were old when they were green oats) and Mr. Smith had known it, they should find in Mr. Hughes' favour. They therefore did so. Mr. Smith appealed.

== Judgment ==
The Court of the Queen's Bench found that the jury had been misdirected and ordered a retrial. Leaning in Mr. Smith's favour, they held that the question was not merely whether the parties were at consensus ad idem (meeting of the minds), but what they had communicated by their conduct and words to one another. Mr. Smith was held to be under no duty to inform Mr. Hughes of his possible mistake about the kind of oats, reaffirming the old idea of caveat emptor (buyer beware). A unilateral mistake is therefore in principle no ground for rescission of a contract. (Note: Compare Hartog v Colin & Shields which distinguished this case, based on finding a usually implied term and a prior course of invitations to treat.) Cockburn CJ gave the first judgment.

Cockburn CJ presided over several other important cases, including the Alabama claims.

I take the true rule to be, that where a specific article is offered for sale, without express warranty, or without circumstances from which the law will imply a warranty—as where, for instance, an article is ordered for a specific purpose—and the buyer has full opportunity of inspecting and forming his own judgment, if he chooses to act on his own judgment, the rule caveat emptor applies. If he gets the article he contracted to buy, and that article corresponds with what it was sold as, he gets all he is entitled to, and is bound by the contract. Here the defendant agreed to buy a specific parcel of oats. The oats were what they were sold as, namely, good oats according to the sample. The buyer persuaded himself they were old oats, when they were not so; but the seller neither said nor did anything to contribute to his deception. He has himself to blame. The question is not what a man of scrupulous morality or nice honour would do under such circumstances. The case put of the purchase of an estate, in which there is a mine under the surface, but the fact is unknown to the seller, is one in which a man of tender conscience or high honour would be unwilling to take advantage of the ignorance of the seller; but there can be no doubt that the contract for the sale of the estate would be binding.

It only remains to deal with an argument which was pressed upon us, that the defendant in the present case intended to buy old oats, and the plaintiff to sell new, so the two minds were not ad idem; and that consequently there was no contract. This argument proceeds on the fallacy of confounding what was merely a motive operating on the buyer to induce him to buy with one of the essential conditions of the contract. Both parties were agreed as to the sale and purchase of this particular parcel of oats. The defendant believed the oats to be old, and was thus induced to agree to buy them, but he omitted to make their age a condition of the contract. All that can be said is, that the two minds were not ad idem as to the age of the oats; they certainly were ad idem as to the sale and purchase of them. Suppose a person to buy a horse without a warranty, believing him to be sound, and the horse turns out unsound, could it be contended that it would be open to him to say that, as he had intended to buy a sound horse, and the seller to sell an unsound one, the contract was void, because the seller must have known from the price the buyer was willing to give, or from his general habits as a buyer of horses, that he thought the horse was sound? The cases are exactly parallel.

Then, Blackburn J, who came to be known as one of the great 19th century judges, agreeing, gave his decision on the issue.

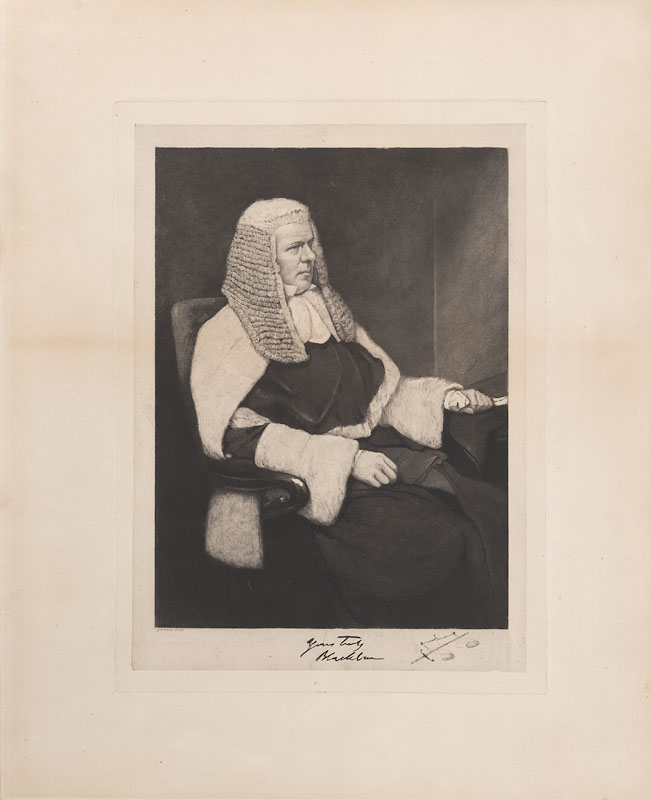
Blackburn J also decided the leading case on acceptance of an offer by conduct, Brogden v Metropolitan Railway Company

In this case I agree that on the sale of a specific article, unless there be a warranty making it part of the bargain that it possesses some particular quality, the purchaser must take the article he has bought though it does not possess that quality. And I agree that even if the vendor was aware that the purchaser thought that the article possessed that quality, and would not have entered into the contract unless he had so thought, still the purchaser is bound, unless the vendor was guilty of some fraud or deceit upon him, and that a mere abstinence from disabusing the purchaser of that impression is not fraud or deceit; for, whatever may be the case in a court of morals, there is no legal obligation on the vendor to inform the purchaser that he is under a mistake, not induced by the act of the vendor. And I also agree that where a specific lot of goods are sold by a sample, which the purchaser inspects instead of the bulk, the law is exactly the same, if the sample truly represents the bulk; though, as it is more probable that the purchaser in such a case would ask for some further warranty, slighter evidence would suffice to prove that, in fact, it was intended there should be such a warranty. On this part of the case I have nothing to add to what the Lord Chief Justice has stated.

But I have more difficulty about the second point raised in the case. I apprehend that if one of the parties intends to make a contract on one set of terms, and the other intends to make a contract on another set of terms, or, as it is sometimes expressed, if the parties are not ad idem, there is no contract, unless the circumstances are such as to preclude one of the parties from denying that he has agreed to the terms of the other. The rule of law is that stated in Freeman v Cooke. If, whatever a man's real intention may be, he so conducts himself that a reasonable man would believe that he was assenting to the terms proposed by the other party, and that other party upon that belief enters into the contract with him, the man thus conducting himself would be equally bound as if he had intended to agree to the other party's terms.

The jury were directed that, if they believed the word “old” was used, they should find for the defendant—and this was right; for if that was the case, it is obvious that neither did the defendant intend to enter into a contract on the plaintiff's terms, that is, to buy this parcel of oats without any stipulation as to their quality; nor could the plaintiff have been led to believe he was intending to do so.

But the second direction raises the difficulty. I think that, if from that direction the jury would understand that they were first to consider whether they were satisfied that the defendant intended to buy this parcel of oats on the terms that it was part of his contract with the plaintiff that they were old oats, so as to have the warranty of the plaintiff to that effect, they were properly told that, if that was so, the defendant could not be bound to a contract without any such warranty unless the plaintiff was misled. But I doubt whether the direction would bring to the minds of the jury the distinction between agreeing to take the oats under the belief that they were old, and agreeing to take the oats under the belief that the plaintiff contracted that they were old.

The difference is the same as that between buying a horse believed to be sound, and buying one believed to be warranted sound; but I doubt if it was made obvious to the jury, and I doubt this the more because I do not see much evidence to justify a finding for the defendant on this latter ground if the word “old” was not used. There may have been more evidence than is stated in the case; and the demeanour of the witnesses may have strengthened the impression produced by the evidence there was; but it does not seem a very satisfactory verdict if it proceeded on this latter ground. I agree, therefore, in the result that there should be a new trial.

Hannen J delivered a concurring judgment.

== See also ==
- Investors' Compensation Scheme Ltd v West Bromwich Building Society [1997] UKHL 28
- Hotchkiss v National City Bank of New York, 200 F 287, 293 (SD NY 1911), per Judge Learned Hand, "A contract has, strictly speaking, nothing to do with the personal, or individual, intent of the parties. A contract is an obligation attached by the mere force of law to certain acts of the parties, usually words, which ordinarily accompany and represent a known intent. If, however, it were proved by twenty bishops that either party, when he used the words, intended something else than the usual meaning that the law imposes upon them, he would still be held, unless there were some mutual mistake or something else of the sort."
- Hillas & Co Ltd v Arcos Ltd [1932] UKHL 2
- Hartog v Colin & Shields [1939] 3 All ER 566
- Frederick E Rose (London) Ltd v William H Pim Junior & Co Ltd [1953] 2 QB 45;References
