= Hartog v Colin & Shields =

English contract law case

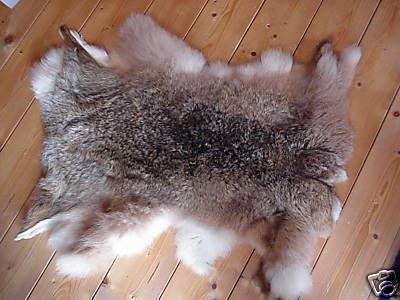
- Court: High Court
- Decided: 27 June 1939
- Citation: [1939] 3 All ER 566

Case opinions
- Singleton J

Keywords
- Mistake - Price of subject-matter of transaction - Goods offered at certain prices per pound instead of per piece - Offeree's knowledge of mistake - Whether acceptance of such offer a binding contract.

Hartog v Colin & Shields [1939] 3 All ER 566 is an important English contract law case regarding unilateral mistake. It holds that when it is obvious that someone has made a mistake in the terms of an offer, one may not simply "snap up" the offer and be able to enforce the agreement.

== Facts ==
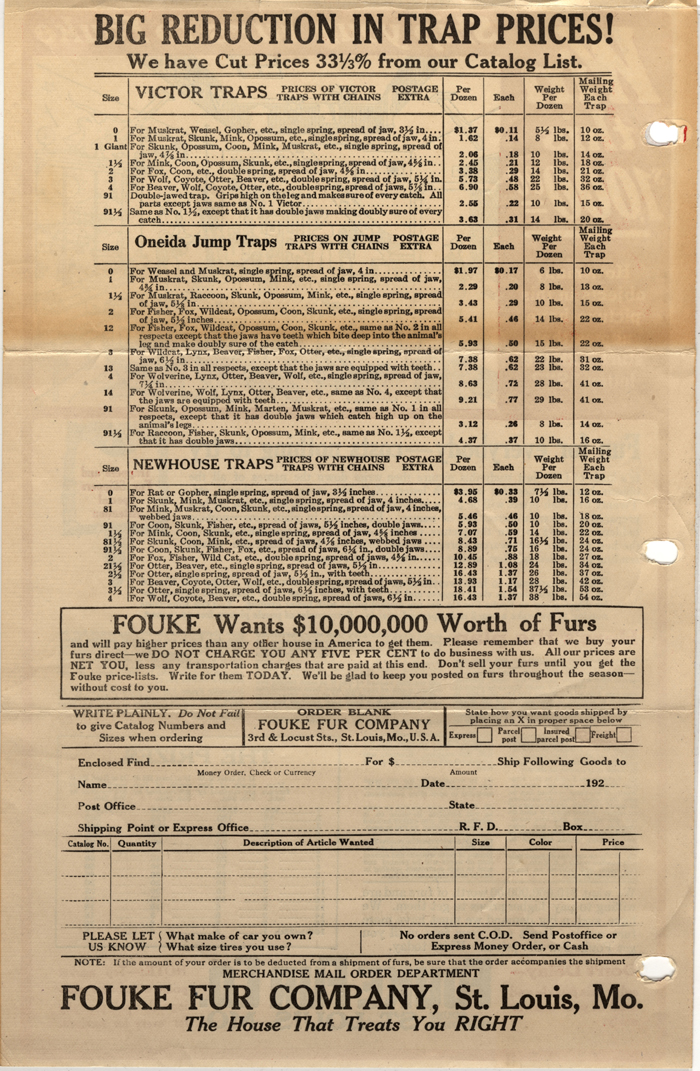
Contemporary example of price list, albeit for trade and public acceptance rather than a private offer to one potential buyer as in this case. Prices were expressed per piece, sometimes price lists added the average weight of each piece.

The defendants, Colin & Shields, were London hide merchants. Mr Louis-Levie Hartog was a Belgian furrier, living in Brussels. Colin & Shields discussed and verbally agreed to sell 30,000 Argentinian hare skins at “10d per skin” (which would have come to £1,250) to Mr Hartog. When the firm made the final offer in writing it mistakenly wrote “10,000 skins at 10d per lb” and the other 20,000 lesser skins similarly per lb (imperial pound), not in the standard unit in the industry of per unit (per piece, that is per skin or half skin). As hare skins average around 5oz, this was 5/16ths of the price discussed and orally agreed upon.

Mr Hartog tried to hold them to this very good written offer. He claimed loss of profit, or, in the alternative, the difference between the contract price and the market price at the time of the breach. Colin & Shields pleaded that their offer was by mistake wrongly expressed. They plead that they had still intended to offer the goods per piece, and not per (imperial) pound. They argued Hartog was well aware of this mistake and fraudulently accepted an offer which he well knew that the defendants had never intended to make. In the circumstances, they denied that any binding contract was entered into, and, if there was, would counterclaim against its enforcement, for its rescission.

== Judgment ==
The judge found in Colin & Shields’ favour on the grounds that the plaintiff must have realised the defendants’ error, which, as it concerned a term of the contract, rendered the contract void. Singleton J read the following judgment.

In this case, the plaintiff, a Belgian subject, claims damages against the defendants because he says they broke a contract into which they entered with him for the sale of Argentine hare skins. The defendants' answer to that claim is:

"There really was no contract, because you knew that the document which went forward to you, in the form of an offer, contained a material mistake. You realised that, and you sought to take advantage of it."

Counsel for the defendants took upon himself the onus of satisfying me that the plaintiff knew that there was a mistake and sought to take advantage of that mistake. In other words, realising that there was a mistake, the plaintiff did that which James LJ, in Tamplin v James, at p 221, described as "snapping up the offer." It is important, I think, to realise that in the verbal negotiations which took place in this country, and in all the discussions there had ever been, the prices of Argentine hare skins had been discussed per piece, and later, when correspondence took place, the matter was always discussed at the price per piece, and never at a price per pound. Those witnesses who were called on behalf of the plaintiff have had comparatively little experience of dealing in Argentine hare skins. Even the expert witness who was called had had very little. One witness, Mr Caytan, I think, had had no dealings in them for some years, though before that he had had some, no doubt. On the whole, I think that the evidence of Mr Wilcox, on behalf of the defendants, is the more likely to be right--namely, that the way in which Argentine hare skins are bought and sold is generally per piece. That is shown by the discussions which took place between the parties in this country, and by the correspondence. Then on 23 November came the offer upon which the plaintiff relies. It was an offer of 10,000 Argentine hares, winters (100 skins equalling 16 kilos), at 10d per lb; 10,000 half hares at 6d per lb; 10,000 summer hares at 5d per lb. Those prices correspond, roughly, in the case of the winter hares, to 3d per piece, half hares 2d per piece, and summer hares 1d per piece. The last offer prior to this, in which prices were mentioned, was on 3 November from the defendants, and the price then quoted for winter hares was 10d per piece. Even allowing that the market was bound to fall a little, I find it difficult to believe that anyone could receive an offer for a large quantity of Argentine hares at a price so low as 3d per piece without having the gravest doubts of it.

I mention merely the price of the winter hares, because Mr Wilcox told me and I accept his evidence, that at some time the price of Argentine winter hares fell to 9d. I am satisfied, however, from the evidence given to me, that the plaintiff must have realised, and did in fact know, that a mistake had occurred. What did he do? Mr Hartog put it forward as being a bona fide act on his part that he at once went to Mr Caytan and entered into a contract with him. I am not sure that it points to a bona fide act at all. Mr Caytan, who was called before me, apparently entered into an arrangement with him on that same day, 23 November, to buy Argentine winter hares at 11d per lb, so that the price, if there had been a contract at 10d per lb, has risen on the sale of the goods to Mr Caytan to 11d per lb. That is [10%] up, which is a considerable increase, and much greater than that which he had been offering to pay in the letters which passed earlier. It is a much greater increase.

I cannot help thinking that, when this quotation in pence per pound reached Mr Hartog, the plaintiff, he must have realised, and that Mr Caytan, too, must have realised, that there was a mistake. Otherwise I cannot understand the quotation. There was an absolute difference from anything which had gone before--a difference in the manner of quotation, in that the skins are offered per pound instead of per piece.

I am satisfied that it was a mistake on the part of the defendants or their servants which caused the offer to go forward in that way, and I am satisfied that anyone with any knowledge of the trade must have realised that there was a mistake. I find it difficult to understand why, when Mr Caytan bought in this way at 11d per lb, he could not tell me what the total purchase price was, and I cannot help thinking that there was an arrangement of some sort, amounting rather to a division of the spoil. That is the view I formed, having heard the witnesses. I do not form it lightly. I have seen the witnesses and heard them, and in this case can form no other view than that there was an accident. The offer was wrongly expressed, and the defendants by their evidence, and by the correspondence, have satisfied me that the plaintiff could not reasonably have supposed that that offer contained the offerers' real intention. Indeed, I am satisfied to the contrary. That means that there must be judgment for the defendants.

== See also ==
- Tamplin v James (1880) 15 Ch D 215, applied in that specific performance would not be available given this would amount to clear "injustice"
- Smith v Hughes (1871) LT 6 QB 597, distinguished
- The Moorcock (1889) 14 PD 64, applied in that the law will imply (contract) such terms as are "obvious and necessary" (not those merely "desirable and reasonable") such as always included or implicit in a particular course of trade.
