= Alderslade v Hendon Laundry Ltd =

- Court: Court of Appeal of England and Wales
- Citation: [1945] KB 189

Keywords
- Construction, contra proferentem

Alderslade v Hendon Laundry Ltd [1945] KB 189 is an English contract law case, concerning the construction of exemption clauses, and the contra proferentem principle.

== Facts ==
Ten large handkerchiefs were lost by the laundry. It argued that its liability was limited by a clause in the contract which read: ‘The maximum amount allowed for lost or damaged articles is twenty times the charge made for laundering.’ That was 11s 5d, about one tenth of the cost of the handkerchiefs at £5.

The judge held that the claim succeeded, and Hendon Laundry Ltd appealed.

== Judgment ==
The Court of Appeal of England and Wales held the limitation clause did apply, because although negligence was not mentioned, the defendants could only have been liable for the handkerchiefs if they had been negligent. A common carrier, for example, must make clear that negligence is excluded, and if that is not done in clear terms, only liability for a strict duty will be excluded. But here, the only other duty was the absolute, primary obligation to perform the contract itself.

Lord Greene MR said the following.

[...] where the head of damage in respect of which limitation of liability is sought to be imposed by such a clause is one which rests on negligence and nothing else, the clause must be construed as extending to that head of damage because it would otherwise lack subject-matter. Where, on the other hand, the head of damage may be based on some other ground than that of negligence, the general principle is that the clause must be confined in its application to loss occurring through that other cause, to the exclusion of loss arising through negligence.

[...]

The only way in which the defendants could be made liable for the loss of articles awaiting their turn to be washed would, I think, quite clearly be if it could be shown that they had been guilty of negligence in performing their duty of care of the goods.

== See also ==
- English contract law
