= Contra proferentem =

Doctrine of contractual interpretation

Contra proferentem (Latin: "against [the] offeror"), also known as "interpretation against the draftsman", is a doctrine of contractual interpretation providing that, where a promise, agreement or term is ambiguous, the preferred meaning should be the one that works against the interests of the party who provided the wording.

== Overview ==
The doctrine is often applied to situations involving standardized contracts or where the parties are of unequal bargaining power, but is applicable to other cases. The doctrine is not, however, directly applicable to situations where the language at issue is mandated by law, as is often the case with insurance contracts and bills of lading.

The reasoning behind this rule is to encourage the drafter of a contract to be as clear and explicit as possible and to take into account as many foreseeable situations as it can. Eric Posner claimed: "The contra proferentem rule, for example, might encourage the drafter to be more explicit and to provide more details about obligations. This may reduce the chance that the other party will misunderstand the contract; it also may facilitate judicial interpretation of the contract." Uri Weiss claimed: "The Contra Proferentem rule motivates the less risk-averse drafter to refrain from manipulating the other side by making the contract unclear. Thus, the two parties can agree that the less risk-averse side will formulate the contract, thus reducing the cost of the transaction. Without this rule, there might be a moral hazard problem".

Additionally, the rule reflects the court's inherent dislike of standard-form take-it-or-leave-it contracts also known as contracts of adhesion (e.g., standard form insurance contracts for individual consumers, residential leases, airline contracts of carriage, etc.). The court perceives such contracts to be the product of bargaining between parties in unfair or uneven positions. To mitigate this perceived unfairness, legal systems apply the doctrine of contra proferentem; giving the benefit of any doubt in favor of the party that did not provide the contract.

Contra proferentem also places the cost of losses on the party who was in the best position to avoid the harm. This is generally the person who drafted the contract. An example of this is the insurance contract mentioned above, which is a good example of an adhesion contract. There, the insurance company is the party completely in control of the terms of the contract and is generally in a better position, for example, to avoid contractual forfeiture.

== Codification ==
The principle is codified in international instruments such as the UNIDROIT Principles and the Principles of European Contract Law, and in some examples of national law:

- in United Kingdom law, with respect to consumer contracts, under Section 69 of the Consumer Rights Act 2015, which states "If a term in a consumer contract, or a consumer notice, could have different meanings, the meaning that is most favourable to the consumer is to prevail".
- in the Brazilian Civil Code, which states that any legal transaction should be interpreted in a way that benefits the party who did not write the terms (article 113, § 1º, IV).
- California Civil Code §1654, enacted in 1872, states "In cases of uncertainty ... the language of a contract should be interpreted most strongly against the party who caused the uncertainty to exist")
- South Korea's ACT ON THE REGULATION OF TERMS AND CONDITIONS §5 states "If the meaning of terms and conditions is not clear, it shall be construed in favor of customers."

== See also ==
- Rule of lenity – For criminal law
