= List of cases involving Lord Denning =

This is a partial list of legal cases involving Lord Denning, who during his career delivered around 2000 reported judgments. After serving as a barrister, Lord Denning served as a judge for nearly 40 years, from 1944 to 1982. He often played a decisive role in developing the law and was influential around the Commonwealth and common law world.

== Counsel ==
- L'Estrange v F Graucob Ltd [1934] 2 KB 394, establishes the doctrine of incorporation by signature
- Regal (Hastings) Ltd v Gulliver [1942] UKHL 1; 1942 1 All ER 378; [1967] 2 AC 134, trustees cannot make profit from office even when the opportunity is not available to their beneficiaries

== High Court ==
- Fletcher v Fletcher [1945] 1 All ER 582, 61 TLR 354: Denning approved the divorce of a husband who deserted his wife by withdrawing sexual intercourse and joining a religious community.
- Central London Property Trust Ltd v High Trees House Ltd [1947] KB 130: Denning resurrected the lost doctrine of promissory estoppel while only a judge in the High Court.

== Court of Appeal ==
- Olley v Marlborough Court Hotel [1949] 1 KB 532: on incorporation of exclusion clauses in contract law.
- Metropolitan Borough and the Town Clerk of Lewisham v Roberts [1949] 2 K.B. 608 (C.A.): dissenting, an executive body should not be allowed to gain title to land if only possession was required for their purpose.
- Solle v Butcher [1950] 1 KB 671: introduced equitable rescission for common mistake, whereby a contract may be voidable if both parties have made a common mistake as to a "fundamental" element of the contract.
- Leaf v International Galleries [1950] 2 KB 86: where significant time has lapsed between the making of the contract and the decision to rescind, the party wishing to rescind is barred from doing so ("laches").
- Curtis v Chemical Cleaning & Dyeing Co [1951] 1 KB 805: established that the rule that a party is bound by the terms of a document which the party has signed will not apply where the signature was induced by misrepresentation, fraud, or in some cases of mistake.
- Candler v Crane, Christmas & Co [1951] 2 KB 164: on negligent misstatement, later adopted by the House of Lords in Hedley Byrne v Heller.
- Errington v Wood (1951) KB: created the equitable doctrine of part performance to save an incomplete contract.
- Combe v Combe (1952): elaborated the stance on promissory estoppel, calling it a "shield", not a "sword".
- Hoenig v Isaacs [1952] EWCA Civ 6 i
- Frederick E Rose (London) Ltd v William H Pim Junior & Co Ltd [1953] 2 QB 450: denied rectification for common mistake about the quality of horebeans under a contract of sale.
- Roe v Minister of Health [1954] 2 All ER 131
- Ladd v Marshall [1954] EWCA Civ 1
- Entores Ltd v Miles Far East Corporation [1955] 2 All ER 493: decided that the "moment of acceptance" in a contract using a telex happens on the receiver's side.
- J Spurling Ltd v Bradshaw [1956] 1 WLR 461

== House of Lords ==
- Scottish Co-operative Wholesale Society Ltd v Meyer [1959] AC 324: on the predecessor to unfair prejudice in UK company law.
- Scruttons Ltd v Midland Silicones Ltd [1962] AC 446: dissenting over the privity of contract doctrine.
- Fairweather v St Marylebone Property Co Ltd [1963] AC 510 (decided 16 April 1962, his last case in the House of Lords): concerned adverse possession

== Master of the Rolls ==
- In re Smith or Barclays Bank Ltd v Mercantile Bank Ltd [1962] 1 WLR 763, decided on 1 May 1962, reversed the decision of Wilberforce J that a trust requiring trustees to give money to "hospitals" could be construed as "non-profit" hospitals, so was not void for uncertainty.
- Boulting v Association of Cinematograph, Television and Allied Technicians [1963] 2 QB 606, dissenting over a closed shop agreement and managers refusing to pay union fees
- Roles v Nathan [1963] 1 WLR 1117, an occupiers' liability case on chimney sweeps.
- Letang v Cooper [1964] 2 All ER 292
- D & C Builders Ltd v Rees [1965] 2 QB 617, where there is an agreement for part payment of a debt in satisfaction of the whole, promissory estoppel does not apply if the agreement was brought by the duress of the party claiming estoppel
- Beswick v Beswick [1966] Ch 538, Denning allows a poor widow to reclaim the assets of her late husband when it was taken from her husband's nephew (disapproved in [1968] AC 58).
- Morris v CW Martin & Sons Ltd [1966] 1 QB 716
- Wheat v E Lacon & Co Ltd [1966] 1 All ER 582; defines "occupier" for the purposes of Occupiers' Liability Act 1957.
- Boardman v Phipps [1966] Ch 992, on the strict application of the no conflict of interest rule for trustees, affirmed by the House of Lords.
- Anglo Continental Holidays Ltd v Typaldos Lines (London) Ltd [1967] 2 Lloyd's Rep 61, ruled that a steamship line could not cite a clause in its passage contract to radically alter the substance and intent of the contract.
- Saunders v Anglia Building Society [1968] 2 All ER 322, established a high threshold for the plea of non est factum and established that the burden of proof lies with the plaintiff to prove that he has not acted negligently
- Torquay Hotel Co Ltd v Cousins [1969] 2 Ch 106, on the new economic tort of "interference with a contract"
- Gould v Gould [1970] 1 QB 275, dissenting on the idea that a husband's promise to help out his wife "as long as [he is] able" should be enforceable.
- Merritt v Merritt [1970] EWCA Civ 6, on the intention to create legal relations between a Husband and wife.
- Hinz v Berry [1970] 2 QB 40, on the recoverability of damages for nervous shock. Denning's judgment began with the words, "It happened on April 19, 1964. It was bluebell time in Kent."
- Lewis v Averay (1971), a contract concluded in-person and under a unilateral mistake of identity was voidable, not void, and thus title in the sold goods passed to the purchaser and to subsequent third parties
- Thornton v Shoe Lane Parking Ltd [1971] 2 QB 163, a case about the incorporation of terms by notice, famous for the opening line of Lord Denning MR's judgment: "Mr Thornton was a freelance trumpeter of the highest quality"
- Broome v Cassell & Co Ltd [1971] 2 QB 354, compensatory damages. Led to strong rebuke by Lord Hailsham in the House of Lords.
- Nettleship v Weston [1971] 3 All ER 581, a learner driver must exercise the skill of an experienced driver to avoid liability in negligence. Want of skill is not a defence to the breach of a duty of care.
- W. J. Alan & Co. v El Nasr Export & Import Co [1972] 2 QB 189, on the principles of waiver and promissory estoppel
- Fuller v Fuller [1973] 1 WLR 730, changed divorce law. Married couples are only cohabiting if they are living with each other as husband and wife.
- Spartan Steel & Alloys Ltd v Martin & Co (Contractors) Ltd [1973] 1 QB 27, concerning the recovery of pure economic loss in negligence.
- Jarvis v Swans Tours Ltd [1973] QB 233, recovery of damages for loss of amenity and mental distress is possible in certain cases
- Lloyds Bank Ltd v Bundy (1975) QB, the equitable doctrine of unconscionable bargain can prevent transactions where a weaker party was exploited
- Courtney and Fairbairn Ltd v Tolaini Brothers (Hotels) Ltd [1975] 1 All ER 716, a contract cannot have terms that are to be negotiated at a later point.
- British Crane Hire Corporation Ltd v Ipswich Plant Hire Ltd [1975] QB 303
- Liverpool City Council v Irwin [1976] UKHL 1
- Anton Piller KG v Manufacturing Processes Limited [1976] Ch 55
- Rose v Plenty [1976] 1 WLR 141, decided the test for "in the course of employment" for an employer's vicarious liability
- Cehave v Bremer, The Hansa Nord [1976] QB 44: Denning demonstrated mastery of Admiralty court law
- Esso Petroleum Co Ltd v Mardon [1976] QB 801, representations made by parties with expert knowledge and experience are warranties in a contract.
- R v Secretary of State for the Home Department, ex parte, Hosenball [1977] 1 W.L.R. 766; [1977] 3 All E.R. 452
- BBC v Hearn [1977] ICR 686
- Miller v Jackson [1977] QB 966, playing cricket in the stadium was in the public interest and stray cricket balls flying onto the road were not a nuisance.
- British Railways Board v Customs and Excise Comrs [1977] STC 221, [1977] 2 All ER 873, zero rating for VAT purposes is a question of law not fact.
- Gouriet v Union of Post Office Workers and Others [1977] CA, "Be ye never so high, the law is above you."
- Parsons (Livestock) Ltd v Uttley Ingham & Co Ltd [1978] QB 791
- Butler Machine Tool Co Ltd v Ex-Cell-O Corp Ltd [1979] 1 All ER, battle of the forms case, where Denning argued the mirror image rule for offer and acceptance is outdated and the courts should be willing to look at the entirety of the parties' communications to ascertain the formation of a contract.
- Quennell v Maltby [1979] WLR 318, asserted that equity conferred a wide, previously unrecognised, discretion to restrain the mortgagee from exercising the right to possession for purposes other than the protection or enforcement of his security.
- Science Research Council v. Nasse [1979] QB 144, comparison of Commission for Racial Equality to inquisition
- Photo Productions v Securicor Ltd [1980] All ER 556
- Ahmad v United Kingdom (1982) 4 EHRR 126
- Attorney General of New Zealand v Ortiz [1982] 3 WLR 570; [1982] 3 All ER 432, beautiful scene setting description of the Maori treasure at the heart of this case.
- Mandla v Dowell-Lee [1983] QB 1, saying that Sikhs were not a racial group under the Race Relations Act 1976, overturned by the House of Lords
- George Mitchell (Chesterhall) Ltd v Finney Lock Seeds Ltd [1982] 3 WLR 1036, classic opener with a quote from Lewis Carroll, later on is his famous speech on the worship of the idol of "freedom of contract". Seed merchants could not rely on damage limitation clause to just the cost of the seeds. This was Lord Denning's last published decision, delivered on 29 September 1982.

== See also ==
- English contract law
- English tort law
- English property law
- English trusts law
