= Ticket cases =

In contract law, the ticket cases are a series of cases that stand for the proposition that if you are handed a ticket or another document with terms, and you retain the ticket or document, then you are bound by those terms. Whether you have read the terms or not is irrelevant, and in a sense, using the ticket is analogous to signing the document. This issue is an important one due to the proliferation of exclusion clauses that accompany tickets in everyday transactions.

This particular framing of the concept is chiefly associated with English contract law but is also used in related legal systems including those of Australia, South Africa, and Scotland.

The case of Parker v. The South Eastern Railway Co (1877) 2 CPD 416 illustrates restrictions on the general rule of the ticket cases:

- Knowledge of writing and of terms: If the recipient of the ticket knew that there was writing on the ticket and also knew that the ticket contained terms, then the recipient is bound by the terms of the contract.
- Reasonable person: If the recipient did not know of the existence of the terms, then the court will consider whether a reasonable person would have known that the ticket contained terms. If that is so, then the ticket-holder is bound by those terms; if not, then the court will return to the general test of whether reasonable notice of the terms was given.

The test of whether a document such as a ticket fits within the description of a contract is an objective test, that is, whether a reasonable person in the position of the ticket-holder would perceive it to be contractual in nature. For instance, if exclusion clauses accompany a docket, it may be held that it is not contractual in nature since it is just a receipt. In Thornton v. Shoe Lane Parking [1971] 1 All ER 686, the Court of Appeal held that the ticket cases did not apply in a situation where the terms were presented only after the transaction was complete.

Interfoto Picture Library Ltd v Stiletto Visual Programmes Ltd [1989] 1 QB 433 held that if a party wishes to incorporate onerous terms into a document that is to be just accepted by the other party, reasonable notice must be given to make it a term of the contract.

== See also ==
- L'Estrange v Graucob [1934] 2 KB 394
- Olley v Marlborough Court [1949] 1 KB 532
- Schroeder Music Publishing Co Ltd v Macaulay, a decision relating to restraint of trade, in which Lord Diplock referred to the ticket cases of the nineteenth century.
