= Incorporation of terms in English law =

Incorporation of terms in English law is the inclusion of terms in contracts formed under English law in such a way that the courts recognise them as valid. For a term to be considered incorporated it must fulfil three requirements. Firstly, notice of the terms should be given before or during the agreement of the contract. Secondly, the terms must be found in a document intended to be contractual. Thirdly, "reasonable steps" must be taken by the party who forms the term to bring it to the attention of the other party. The rules on incorporating terms in English law are almost all at a common law level.

== Incorporation ==
For a written term to be considered incorporated by the courts, it must fulfil three requirements. Firstly, notice of the terms should be given before or during the agreement of the contract. Secondly, the terms must be found in a document intended to be contractual. Thirdly, "reasonable steps" must be taken by the party who forms the term to bring it to the attention of the other party.

=== Notice ===
For a term to be considered incorporated into a contract, notice of that term must be given before or during the time of contracting, something established by Olley v Marlborough Court Hotel [1949] 1 KB 532. The claimant booked a room in a hotel owned by the defendant. Inside the door of her room was a notice stating that the hotel was not liable for anything lost or stolen unless the item had been given to the management to look after. When the fur coat of the claimant was stolen from her room, she sued the defendant for damages. It was held that because the contract had been made at the reception desk before the parties got to the room, and because notice of the term was only given after the formation of the contract, it was not an incorporated term and the claimant could sue the defendant for damages.

An exception to the rule on notice is past dealings. If the parties have had similar dealings in the past, the courts have previously found that notice is not necessarily required if their past dealings represent a "consistent course of action". In McCutcheon v David MacBrayne Ltd [1964] 1 WLR 125 the House of Lords said that the course of dealing must be both "regular and consistent". This has never been more closely defined, however - in Henry Kendall Ltd v William Lillico Ltd [1969] 2 AC 31 the House of Lords held that 100 similar contracts over three years were a "regular and consistent" course of dealing, but in Hollier v Rambler Motors (AMC) Ltd [1972] 2 QB 71 the Court of Appeal held that four contracts over five years was not a course of dealing.

=== Contractual document ===
The second rule required for clauses to be considered incorporated is that they must be found in a document intended to be contractually binding. In Chapelton v Barry Urban District Council [1940] 1 KB 532 the claimant hired a deckchair from Barry Urban District Council to use on a beach in Cold Knap. The claimant took two receipts from the beach attendant, on the back of which were the words "the council will not be liable for any accident or damage arising from the hire of the chair". The chair was defective and broke, injuring the claimant. He sued the council, who relied on the clause on the receipts to protect them from liability. The Court of Appeal held that the clause could not protect the council, as the receipt was not a document that one would expect to contain contractual terms.

If one signs a contractual document it is automatically considered to be binding, even if the party has not read the terms. In L'Estrange v F Graucob Ltd [1934] 2 KB 394 the Court of Appeal held that a written document was contractually binding even though the claimant had not read the document and the clause was in "regrettably small print".

=== Attention of the other party ===
The third rule required for clauses to be considered incorporated is that "reasonable steps" must be taken by the party who forms the term to bring it to the attention of the other party. This is demonstrated by Parker v South Eastern Railway Company [1877] 2 CPD 416, where it was established that it does not matter if one party actually reads a set of terms, only that the other party takes "reasonable steps" to bring them to their attention.

If a notice of the term is displayed on the contractual document, this is normally sufficient. In Thompson v London, Midland and Scottish Railway Co Ltd [1930] 1 KB 41 the claimant asked her niece to buy a railway ticket for her. The ticket said "see back" on it, with the back of the ticket informing the reader that the full terms and conditions could be found in the company timetables. Even though the claimant was illiterate and could not read the ticket, the Court of Appeal held that the clause was still valid because "reasonable steps" had been taken to bring it to the claimant's attention. This does not necessarily apply if the other party is aware of any disabilities - in Richardson, Spence & Co v Rowntree [1894] AC 217 the courts made the opposite decision because the term was in small print, and because of a known condition of the claimant he could not have been expected to read it.

A rule is that the more exceptional or unusual a term is, the more that must be done to bring it to the attention of the other party. In J Spurling Ltd v Bradshaw [1956] 1 WLR 461 Lord Denning said that "the more unreasonable a clause is, the greater the notice which must be given of it. Some clauses which I have seen would need to be printed in red ink on the face of the document with a red hand pointing to it before the notice could be held to be sufficient", establishing the "red hand rule".

== Bibliography ==
- Furmston, Michael (2007). Cheshire, Fifoot & Furmston's Law of Contract (15th ed.). Oxford University Press. ISBN 978-0-19-928756-7.
- McKendrick, Ewan (2007). Contract Law (7th ed.). Palgrave Macmillan. ISBN 0-230-01883-1.
- Peel, Edwin (2007). Treitel - The Law Of Contract (12th ed.). Sweet & Maxwell. ISBN 978-0-421-94840-2.
- Turner, Chris (2007). Jacqueline Martin (ed.). Unlocking Contract Law (2nd ed.). Hodder Arnold. ISBN 9780340941966.
