= O'Brien v MGN Ltd =

English contract law case

- Court: Court of Appeal of England and Wales
- Full case name: Lee Headley O'Brien v MGN Limited
- Decided: August 1, 2001
- Citation: [2001] EWCA Civ 1279

Court membership
- Judges sitting: Potter LJ, Hale LJ, Anthony Evans

Keywords
- Reasonable notice, incorporation

O'Brien v MGN Ltd [2001] EWCA Civ 1279 is an English contract law case, concerning incorporation of terms through reasonable notice.

== Facts ==
The defendant put scratchcards with its newspapers-- Daily Mirror, Sunday Mirror and The People. If the card came up with money, players called a premium rate number to see if the amount matched a mystery bonus cash amount. Mr O'Brien on 3 July 1995 got two sums of £50,000. 1472 other people did as well, because MGN had distributed too many by mistake. MGN had only intended to have one prize of £50,000. MGN held a draw among the 1472. MGN pointed to "Rule 5", which said there would be a draw where more prizes were claimed than available. Rule 5, however, although published in some editions, was not to be found in the 3 July 1995 edition. This only said "Normal Mirror Group rules apply". Mr O'Brien had seen that. The question was whether Rule 5 was incorporated into the scratchcard agreement.

== Judgment ==
Hale LJ held that Rule 5 was incorporated. She noted that Rule 5 was no great burden on the claimant, as in Interfoto, nor excluding liability for injury like Thornton, but simply deprived a windfall. She also noted that in the test for incorporation, the words "onerous or unusual" are not "terms of art". Potter LJ concurred with Hale LJ. Sir Anthony Evans was doubtful that judge's reasons were right and thought the rule was onerous enough to require more notice, but he agreed, nevertheless, that the appeal should be dismissed.

== See also ==
- Parker v South Eastern Railway Co (1877) 2 CPD 416
- Chapelton v Barry UDC [1940] 1 KB 532
- Olley v Marlborough Court Ltd [1949] 1 KB 532
- J Spurling Ltd v Bradshaw [1956] 1 WLR 461
- Thornton v Shoe Lane Parking Ltd [1971] 2 QB 163.
