= Thornton v Shoe Lane Parking Ltd =

English contract law case

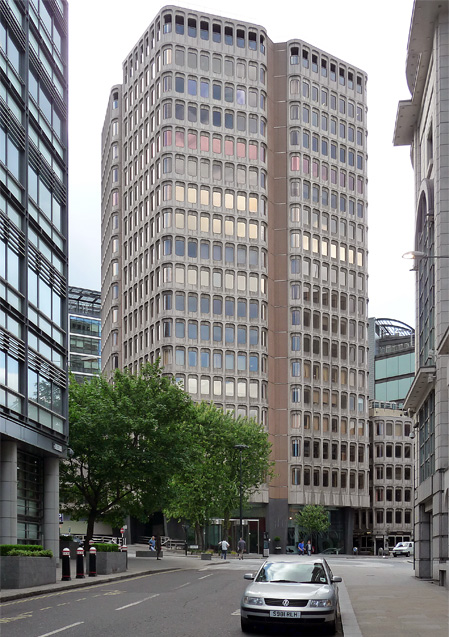
- International Press Centre, Shoe Lane
- Court: Court of Appeal
- Full case name: FRANCIS CHARLES WILLIAM THORNTON Plaintiff Respondent and SHOE LANE PARKING LIMITED Defendants Appellants
- Decided: 18 December 1970
- Citation: [1971] 2 QB 163; [1971] 1 All ER 686; [1970] EWCA Civ 2

Court membership
- Judges sitting: Lord Denning MR, Megaw LJ and Sir Gordon Willmer

Keywords
- Incorporation; offer and acceptance

Thornton v Shoe Lane Parking Ltd [1970] EWCA Civ 2 is a leading English contract law case. It provides a good example of the rule that a clause cannot be incorporated after a contract has been concluded, without reasonable notice before. Also, it was held that an automatic ticket machine was an offer, rather than an invitation to treat, that the insertion of money was an acceptance, therefore, specifically, any (additional) conditions on the ticket were post-acceptance and invalid.

Although the case is important for these two propositions, today any exclusion of negligence liability for personal injury by businesses is prohibited by the Unfair Contract Terms Act 1977 s 2(1) and the Unfair Terms in Consumer Contracts Regulations 1999 Sch 2, para(a).

== Facts ==
Francis Thornton, "a free lance trumpeter of the highest quality", drove to the entrance of the multi-storey car park on Shoe Lane, before attending a performance at Farringdon Hall with the BBC. (Note: The car park was situated below the International Press Centre on Shoe Lane in central London. Both the car park and the International Press Centre were demolished during 2014.) He took a ticket from the ticket machine and parked his car. It said

This ticket is issued subject to the conditions of issue as displayed on the premises.

On the car park pillars near the paying office there was a list, one excluding liability for

injury to the Customer ... howsoever that loss, misdelivery, damage or injury shall be caused.

Three hours later he had an accident before getting into his car. The car park operator argued that the judge should have held the matter regulated by this contract, not tort.

== Judgment ==
Lord Denning MR held that the more onerous the clause, the better notice of it needed to be given. Moreover, the contract was already concluded when the ticket came out of the machine, and so any condition on it could not be incorporated in the contract.

The important thing to notice is that the company seek by this condition to exempt themselves from liability, not only for damage to the car, but also for injury to the customer howsoever caused. The condition talks about insurance. It is well known that the customer is usually insured against damage to the car. But he is not insured against damage to himself. If the condition is incorporated into the contract of parking, it means that Mr. Thornton will be unable to recover any damages for his personal injuries which were caused by the negligence of the company.

We have been referred to the ticket cases of former times from Parker v South Eastern Railway Co (1877) 2 CPD 416 to McCutcheon v David MacBrayne Ltd [1964] 1 WLR 125. They were concerned with railways, steamships and cloakrooms where booking clerks issued tickets to customers who took them away without reading them. In those cases the issue of the ticket was regarded as an offer by the company. If the customer took it and retained it without objection, his act was regarded as an acceptance of the offer: see Watkins v Rymill (1833) 10 QBD 178, 188 and Thompson v London, Midland and Scottish Railway Co [1930] 1 KB 41, 47. These cases were based on the theory that the customer, on being handed the ticket, could refuse it and decline to enter into a contract on those terms. He could ask for his money back. That theory was, of course, a fiction. No customer in a thousand ever read the conditions. If he had stopped to do so, he would have missed the train or the boat.

None of those cases has any application to a ticket which is issued by an automatic machine. The customer pays his money and gets a ticket. He cannot refuse it. He cannot get his money back. He may protest to the machine, even swear at it. But it will remain unmoved. He is committed beyond recall. He was committed at the very moment when he put his money into the machine. The contract was concluded at that time. It can be translated into offer and acceptance in this way: the offer is made when the proprietor of the machine holds it out as being ready to receive the money. The acceptance takes place when the customer puts his money into the slot. The terms of the offer are contained in the notice placed on or near the machine stating what is offered for the money. The customer is bound by those terms as long as they are sufficiently brought to his notice before-hand, but not otherwise. He is not bound by the terms printed on the ticket if they differ from the notice, because the ticket comes too late. The contract has already been made: see Olley v Marlborough Court Ltd [1949] 1 KB 532. The ticket is no more than a voucher or receipt for the money that has been paid (as in the deckchair case, Chapelton v Barry Urban District Council [1940] 1 KB 532) on terms which have been offered and accepted before the ticket is issued.

In the present case the offer was contained in the notice at the entrance giving the charges for garaging and saying "at owner's risk," i.e., at the risk of the owner so far as damage to the car was concerned. The offer was accepted when Mr Thornton drove up to the entrance and, by the movement of his car, turned the light from red to green, and the ticket was thrust at him. The contract was then concluded, and it could not be altered by any words printed on the ticket itself. In particular, it could not be altered so as to exempt the company from liability for personal injury due to their negligence.

Assuming, however, that an automatic machine is a booking clerk in disguise – so that the old fashioned ticket cases still apply to it. We then have to go back to the three questions put by Mellish LJ in Parker v South Eastern Railway Co, 2 CPD 416, 423, subject to this qualification: Mellish LJ used the word "conditions" in the plural, whereas it would be more apt to use the word "condition" in the singular, as indeed the lord justice himself did on the next page. After all, the only condition that matters for this purpose is the exempting condition. It is no use telling the customer that the ticket is issued subject to some "conditions" or other, without more: for he may reasonably regard "conditions" in general as merely regulatory, and not as taking away his rights, unless the exempting condition is drawn specifically to his attention. (Alternatively, if the plural "conditions" is used, it would be better prefaced with the word "exempting," because the exempting conditions are the only conditions that matter for this purpose.) Telescoping the three questions, they come to this: the customer is bound by the exempting condition if he knows that the ticket is issued subject to it; or, if the company did what was reasonably sufficient to give him notice of it.

Mr. Machin admitted here that the company did not do what was reasonably sufficient to give Mr. Thornton notice of the exempting condition. That admission was properly made. I do not pause to inquire whether the exempting condition is void for unreasonableness. All I say is that it is so wide and so destructive of rights that the court should not hold any man bound by it unless it is drawn to his attention in the most explicit way. It is an instance of what I had in mind in J Spurling Ltd v Bradshaw [1956] 1 WLR 461, 466. In order to give sufficient notice, it would need to be printed in red ink with a red hand pointing to it – or something equally startling.

But, although reasonable notice of it was not given, Mr. Machin said that this case came within the second question propounded by Mellish LJ, namely that Mr. Thornton "knew or believed that the writing contained conditions." There was no finding to that effect. The burden was on the company to prove it, and they did not do so. Certainly there was no evidence that Mr. Thornton knew of this exempting condition. He is not, therefore, bound by it.

Mr. Machin relied on a case in this court last year – Mendelssohn v Normand Ltd. [1970] 1 QB 177. Mr. Mendelssohn parked his car in the Cumberland Garage at Marble Arch, and was given a ticket which contained an exempting condition. There was no discussion as to whether the condition formed part of the contract. It was conceded that it did. That is shown by the report in the Law Reports at p. 180. Yet the garage company were not entitled to rely on the exempting condition for the reasons there given.

That case does not touch the present, where the whole question is whether the exempting condition formed part of the contract. I do not think it did. Mr. Thornton did not know of the condition, and the company did not do what was reasonably sufficient to give him notice of it.

I do not think the garage company can escape liability by reason of the exemption condition. I would, therefore, dismiss the appeal.

Megaw LJ and Sir Gordon Willmer agreed with the onerous point, but reserved their opinions on where the contract was concluded. Furthermore, Sir Gordon – similarly to Denning – distinguished this case from the other ticket cases based upon the fact that a human clerk proffered the ticket and the buyer therefore would have had the opportunity to disagree with the conditions, hand the ticket back and have their money refunded.

== See also ==
- Parker v South Eastern Railway Company (1877) 2 CPD 416
- Chapelton v Barry UDC [1940] 1 KB 532
- Olley v Marlborough Court Hotel [1949] 1 KB 532
- J Spurling Ltd v Bradshaw [1956] 1 WLR 461
- Interfoto Picture Library Ltd v Stiletto Visual Programmes Ltd [1989] QB 433
- George Mitchell v Finney Lock Seeds Ltd [1983] QB 284
