= Richards v Murgatroyd =

- Court: Court of Appeal of New Zealand
- Full case name: Richards v Murgatroyd
- Decided: 21 August 2000

Richards v Murgatroyd is a cited case in New Zealand regarding the enforceability of exclusion clauses.
