= Weinberg v Olivier =

1942 South African contract law case

Weinberg v Olivier is an important case in South African contract law, especially in the area of exemption clauses. It was heard in the Appellate Division on 20 October 1942, with judgment handed down on 26 November. De Wet CJ, Watermeyer JA, Tindall JA, Centlivres JA and Feetham JA were the judges.

== Facts ==
The plaintiff, under an arrangement with the defendant, left his car at the latter's garage each day at a monthly charge. The defendant undertook to dust the car each day and polish it once a month. Inside the garage was a notice—"Cars garaged at owner's risk"—of which the plaintiff was aware. The car having been removed from the garage by a person employed by the defendant to look after the cars in the garage, and having been severely damaged in a collision with a building, the plaintiff claimed damages for breach of the defendant's obligation to keep the car safe in the garage.

A Provincial Division, on appeal from a magistrate's court, awarded damages, and the defendant appealed.

== Arguments ==
The point was taken for the first time in the litigation that the plaintiff was not the owner of the car, and that he had therefore failed to prove he had suffered damage.

== Judgment ==
The court held that, under the circumstances, the defendant was under a contractual obligation to keep the car under his control in the garage. Having delegated the performance of that obligation to his servant, who had not performed such obligation, the defendant was liable in damages unless the condition as to owner's risk modified that position.

The only risks which the plaintiff undertook to bear were risks attendant on the garaging of the car, not risks to which the car might be exposed if, in breach of the contract between the parties, it was taken out of the garage and into the public streets. Inasmuch as the plaintiff's locus standi had not been challenged in either of the courts below, and as the defendant himself in his plea had referred to the car as the plaintiff's car, it was far too late for the defendant to be raising such issue.

The decision of the Cape Provincial Division, in Oliver v Weinberg, was thus confirmed.

== See also ==
- Contract
- South African contract law
