= Schroeder Music Publishing Co Ltd v Macaulay =

Macaulay v Schroeder Music Publishing Co Ltd
- Court: House of Lords
- Citation: [1974] 1 WLR 1308

Case opinions
- Lord Diplock

Keywords
- Restraint of trade, unequal bargaining power

Macaulay v Schroeder Music Publishing Co Ltd [1974] 1 WLR 1308 is an English contract law decision of the House of Lords relating to restraint of trade.

== Facts ==
Macaulay, a novice songwriter aged 21, entered into a standard form agreement with Schroeder Music, whereby they would have the exclusive benefit of his compositions. The global copyright was assigned to another party in return for a fixed percentage of any royalties. This was to last five years and could be automatically extended for five years if the royalties went above £5000. Schroeder Music could terminate or assign the contract, but Macaulay could not, and Schroeder was under no obligation to publish or promote anything. Macaulay claimed the agreement was contrary to public policy.

== Judgment ==
The House of Lords held the standard form agreement could not be justified as being purely moulded through negotiation, competition and public opinion. Macaulay had no bargaining power. The defendants purported to be able to arbitrarily decline to exploit the plaintiff's work, in which event the plaintiff's remuneration under the agreement would be limited to a £50 advance payable thereunder during the five-year period. The defendants' power to assign precluded the argument that the restrictions would not be enforced oppressively. The defendants had failed to justify restrictions which appeared unnecessary and capable of oppressive enforcement.

Lord Diplock said the following.

The same presumption, however, does not apply to the other kind of standard form of contract. This is of comparatively modern origin. It is the result of the concentration of particular kinds of business in relatively few hands. The ticket cases in the 19th century provide what are probably the first examples. The terms of this kind of standard form of contract have not been the subject of negotiation between the parties to it, or approved by any organisation representing the interests of the weaker party. They have been dictated by that party whose bargaining power, either exercised alone or in conjunction with others providing similar goods or services, enables him to say: "If you want these goods or services at all, these are the only terms on which they are obtainable. Take it or leave it." To be in a position to adopt this attitude towards a party desirous of entering into a contract to obtain goods or services provides a classic instance of superior bargaining power. It is not without significance that on the evidence in the present case music publishers in negotiating with song writers whose success has been already established do not insist upon adhering to a contract in the standard form they offered to the respondent. The fact that the appellants' bargaining power vis-a-vis the respondent was strong enough to enable them to adopt this take-it-or-leave-it attitude raises no presumption that they used it to drive an unconscionable bargain with him, but in the field of restraint of trade it calls for vigilance on the part of the court to see that they did not.

Lord Reid, Viscount Dilhorne, Lord Kilbrandon and Lord Simon also sat on the case.

== See also ==
- English contract law
- Esso Petroleum Co Ltd v Harper's Garage (Stourport) Ltd [1968] A.C. 269
