= Cold Knap =

- District of Barry
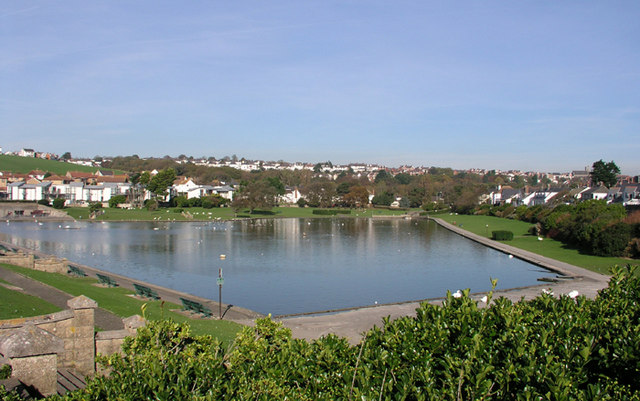
- Cold Knap lake

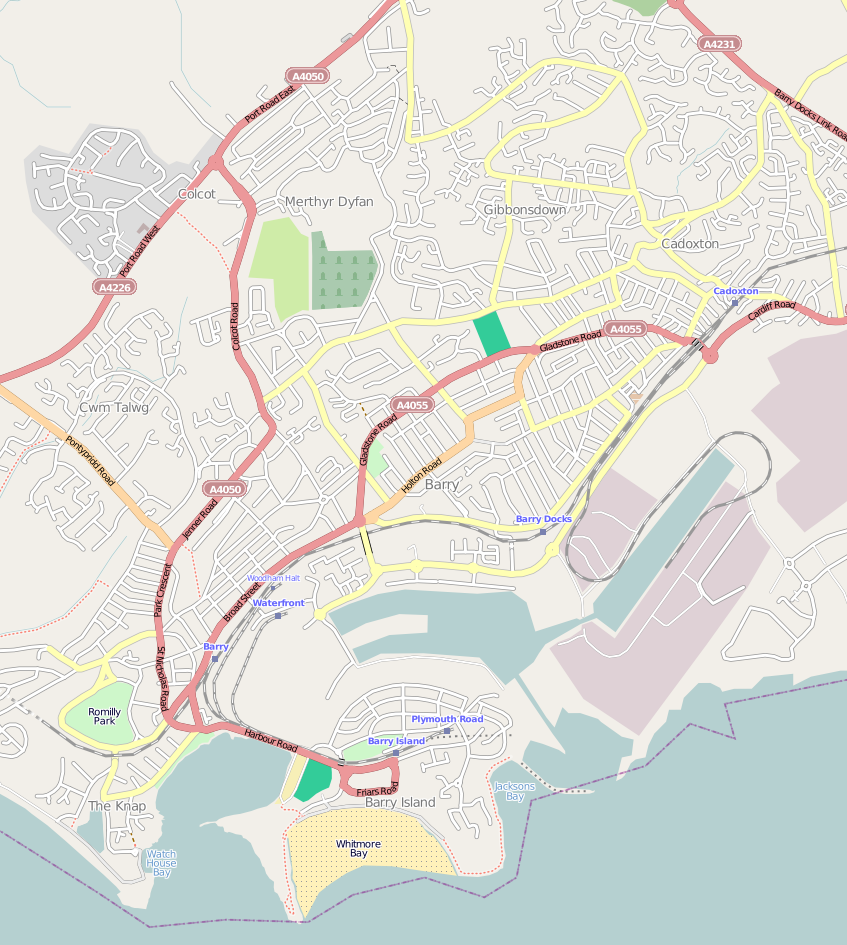
- Location in Barry
- Coordinates: 51°23′14″N 3°17′25″W
- Country: United Kingdom
- Region: Wales
- County: Vale of Glamorgan
- Town: Barry
- Time zone: UTC+0 (GMT)

Cold Knap is a district of Barry in South Wales.

== Amenities ==
Cold Knap is a coastal pebble beach (with some sand at low tide), approximately a mile west of the sandy beach at Barry Island, which attracts visitors during the summer months. It extends generally westwards towards Porthkerry from Cold Knap Point. It was founded by the Romans who used it as a port, and the remains of a Roman building here are now a scheduled monument.

Attractions include a lake shaped like a Welsh harp and the Richard Taylor Memorial Skatepark. There was previously an outdoor swimming pool, but this has now been closed and filled in, and the area turned into a tourist trail. There was a campaign to have the lido rebuilt during 2014 but an enthusiastic online campaign (including a Facebook campaign group ("Rebuild the Knap Lido") has not been successful, despite a number of celebrity endorsements (including local BBC weatherman Derek Brockway).

Cold Knap Lake is the title and subject of a poem by Gillian Clarke, which has been included in an English literature GCSE syllabus in England. Cold Knap Point is the site of a sewage pumping station serving Barry. It was also the location of a case in English contract law - Chapelton v. Barry UDC [1940] 1 KB 532 - where a man's deckchair collapsed.

The park is listed at Grade II on the Cadw/ICOMOS Register of Parks and Gardens of Special Historic Interest in Wales.
