= J Spurling Ltd v Bradshaw =

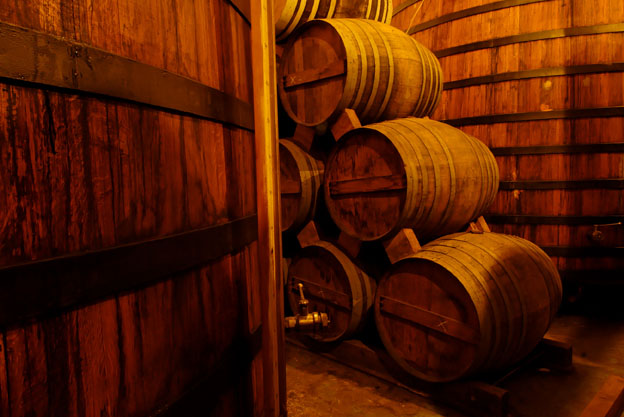
- Court: Court of Appeal
- Decided: 26 March 1956
- Citations: [1956] EWCA Civ 3 (Bailii) [1956] 1 WLR 461 [1956] 2 All ER 121 [1956] 1 Lloyd's Rep 392

Court membership
- Judges sitting: Denning LJ, Morris LJ, Parker LJ

J Spurling Ltd v Bradshaw [1956] EWCA Civ 3 is an English contract law and English property law case on exclusion clauses and bailment. It is best known for Denning LJ's "red hand rule" comment, where he said,

I quite agree that the more unreasonable a clause is, the greater the notice which must be given of it. Some clauses which I have seen would need to be printed in red ink on the face of the document with a red hand pointing to it before the notice could be held to be sufficient.

== Facts ==
J Spurling Ltd had a warehouse in East London. Mr Andrew Bradshaw had seven barrels of orange juice. He asked Spurling Ltd to store them. In the contract was the "London lighterage clause" which exempted warehousemen from liability due to their negligence. When the barrels were collected, they were damaged. When Bradshaw refused to pay Spurling Ltd, the company sued for the cost. Bradshaw counterclaimed for damages for breach of an implied term of a contract of bailment to take reasonable care.

== Judgment ==
Denning LJ, Morris LJ and Parker LJ held that although the warehouse employees were negligent, the clause effectively exempted them.

Denning LJ's judgment went as follows. Note that his reference to the concept of a fundamental breach precluding an exclusion of liability was rejected by the House of Lords some years later in Photo Production Ltd v Securicor Transport Ltd [1980] AC 827.

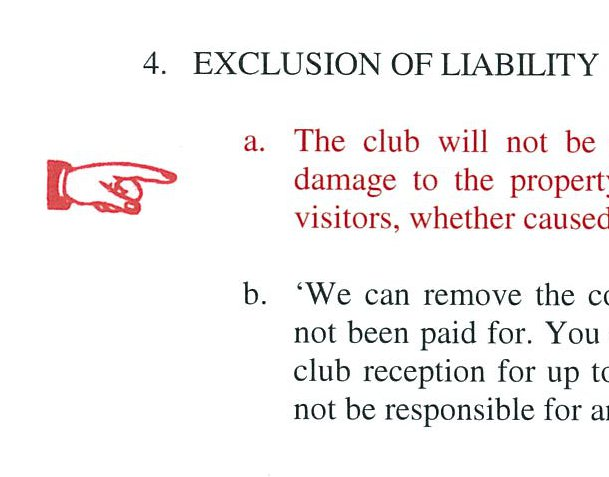
Lord Denning's Red Hand Rule in action: A red hand points to an unfair contract term, printed in red ink.

If the clause is taken literally, it is wide enough to exempt the company from any obligation to redeliver the goods. It would mean that if the managing director sold the orange juice to somebody else, or used it up for the company's purposes, maybe by mistake or even dishonestly, the company would not be liable; or if some discontented storeman took the bung out of a barrel and let the orange juice escape, the company still would not be liable. If the clause went to those lengths, it would be very unreasonable and might for that reason be invalid on the lines which Baron Bramwell indicated in Parker v. South Eastern Railway Company (1877) 2 C.P.D. 416, at p. 428; but I do not think this clause is to be construed as widely as that. These exempting clauses are nowadays all held to be subject to the overriding proviso that they only avail to exempt a party when he is carrying out his contract, not when he is deviating from it or is guilty of a breach which goes to the root of it. Just as a party who is guilty of a radical breach is disentitled from insisting on the further performance by the other, so also he is disentitled from relying on an exempting clause. For instance, if a carrier by land agrees to collect goods and deliver them forthwith, and in breach of that contract he leaves them unattended for an hour instead of carrying them to their destination, with the result that they are stolen, he is disentitled from relying on the exempting clause. That was decided in 1944 by this Court in the case of Bontex Knitting Works, Ltd. v. St. John's Garage (1944) 60 T.L.R. 253, expressly approving the judgment of Mr. Justice Lewis in the same volume at p. 44; or if a bailee by mistake sells the goods or stores them in the wrong place, he is not covered by the exempting clause: see the decision of Mr. Justice McNair in Woolmer v. Delmer Price, Ltd. [1955] 1 Q.B. 291.

The essence of the contract by a warehouseman is that he will store the goods in the contractual place and deliver them on demand to the bailor or his order. If he stores them in a different place, or if he consumes or destroys them instead of storing them, or if he sells them, or delivers them without excuse to somebody else, he is guilty of a breach which goes to the root of the contract and he cannot rely on the exempting clause. But if he should happen to damage them by some momentary piece of inadvertence, then he is able to rely on the exempting clause: because negligence by itself, without more, is not a breach which goes to the root of the contract (see Swan, Hunter, and Wigham Richardson, Ltd. v. France Fenwick Tyne and Wear Company, Ltd. [1953] 2 Lloyd's Rep. 82, at p. 88), any more than non-payment by itself is such a breach: see Mersey Steel and Iron Company, Ltd. v. Naylor, Benzon & Co. (1884) 9 App. Cas. 434, at p. 443. I would not like to say, however, that negligence can never go to the root of the contract. If a warehouseman were to handle the goods so roughly as to warrant the inference that he was reckless and indifferent to their safety, he would, I think, be guilty of a breach going to the root of the contract and could not rely on the exempting clause. He cannot be allowed to escape from his obligation by saying to himself: "I am not going to trouble about these goods because I am covered by an exempting clause."

Another thing to remember about these exempting clauses is that in the ordinary way the burden is on the bailee to bring himself within the exception. A bailor, by pleading and presenting his case properly, can always put on the bailee the burden of proof.

In the case of non-delivery, for instance, all he need plead is the contract and a failure to deliver on demand. That puts on the bailee the burden of proving either loss without his fault—which, of course, would be a complete answer at common law—or, if it was due to his fault, it was a fault from which he is excused by the exempting clause: see Cunard Steamship Company, Ltd. v Buerger [1927] A.C. 1; (1926) 25 Ll.L.Rep. 215, and Woolmer v. Delmer Price, Ltd. [1955] 1 Q.B. 291. I do not think that the Court of Appeal in Alderslade v. Hendon Laundry, Ltd. [1945] K.B. 189, had the burden of proof in mind at all.

Likewise with goods that are returned by the bailee in a damaged condition, the burden is on him to show that the damage was done without his fault: or that, if fault there was, it was excused by the exempting clause. Nothing else will suffice.

But, where the only charge made in the pleadings—or the only reasonable inference on the facts—is that the damage was due to negligence and nothing more, then the bailee can rely on the exempting clause without more ado. That was, I think, the case here. As I read the pleadings, and the way the case was put to the Judge, Mr. Bradshaw was complaining of negligence and nothing more. The clause therefore avails to exempt the warehousemen, provided always that it was part of the contract.

This brings me to the question whether this clause was part of the contract. Mr. Sofer urged us to hold that the warehousemen did not do what was reasonably sufficient to give notice of the conditions within Parker v South Eastern Railway Company. I quite agree that the more unreasonable a clause is, the greater the notice which must be given of it. Some clauses I have seen would need to be printed in red ink on the face of the document with a red hand pointing to it before the notice could be held to be sufficient. The clause in this case, however, in my judgment, does not call for such exceptional treatment, especially when it is construed, as it should be, subject to the proviso that it only applies when the warehouseman is carrying out his contract and not when he is deviating from it or breaking it in a radical respect. So construed, the Judge was, I think, entitled to find that sufficient notice was given. It is to be noticed that the landing account on its face bold Mr. Bradshaw that the goods would be insured if he gave instructions; otherwise they were not insured. The invoice, on its face, told him they were warehoused "at owner's risk." The printed conditions, when read subject to the proviso which I have mentioned, added little or nothing to those explicit statements taken together.

Next it was said that the landing account and invoice were issued after the goods had been received and could not therefore be part of the contract of bailment: but Mr. Bradshaw admitted that he had received many landing accounts before. True he had not troubled to read them. On receiving this account, he took no objection to it, left the goods there, and went on paying the warehouse rent for months afterwards. It seems to me that by the course of business and conduct of the parties, these conditions were part of the contract.

In these circumstances, the warehousemen were entitled to rely on this exempting condition. I think, therefore, that the counterclaim was properly dismissed, and this appeal also should be dismissed.

== Reception ==
Denning's "red hand" phrasing—and the idea that particularly onerous clauses (including but not limited to exclusion clauses) need sufficient notice if not incorporated by signature (or other means) has been widely referred to in a number of significant English cases subsequently including Thornton v Shoe Lane Parking Ltd, and Interfoto Picture Library Ltd v Stiletto Visual Programmes Ltd. The Court of Appeal questioned the wide applicability of it in the case of AEG (UK) Ltd v Logic Resource Ltd (in part as the Unfair Contract Terms Act 1977 provided a statutory relief from unfair terms), but it was cited with approval in Lacey's Footwear v Bowler International.
