= Voidable contract =

Contract which a party may invalidate

A voidable contract, unlike a void contract, is a valid contract which may be either affirmed or rejected at the option of one of the parties. At most, one party to the contract is bound. The unbound party may repudiate (reject) the contract, at which time the contract becomes void.

Typical grounds for a contract being voidable include coercion, undue influence, mental incompetence, intoxication, misrepresentation or fraud. A contract made by a minor is often voidable, but a minor can only avoid a contract during their minority status and for a reasonable time after reaching the age of majority. After a reasonable period of time, the contract is deemed to be ratified and cannot be avoided. Other examples would be real estate contracts, lawyer contracts, etc.

When a contract is entered into without the free consent of the party, it is considered a voidable contract. The definition of the act states that a voidable contract is enforceable by law at the option of one or more parties but not at option of the other parties. A voidable contract may be considered valid if it is not cancelled by the aggrieved party within a reasonable time.

== See also ==
- voidable generally
- void contract
- unenforceable
