= L'Estrange v F Graucob Ltd =

1934 English legal case

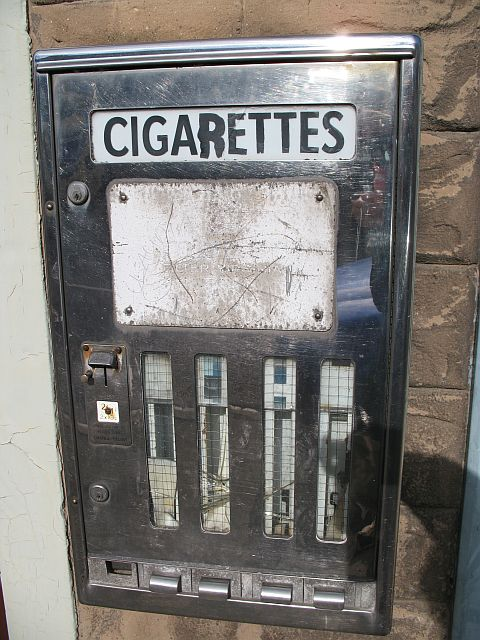
- Court: Court of Appeal
- Citation: [1934] 2 KB 394

Case opinions
- Maugham LJ and Scrutton LJ

L'Estrange v F Graucob Ltd [1934] 2 KB 394 is a leading English contract law case on the incorporation of terms into a contract by signature. There are exceptions to the rule that a person is bound by his or her signature, including fraud, misrepresentation and non est factum.

Lord Denning, as a young barrister, represented the company in this action, but later - for instance, speaking in Parliament in 1977 - made clear that he regarded the decision as wrong.

== Facts ==
Miss Harriet Mary L'Estrange had a cafe in Great Ormes Road, Llandudno. Two travelling salesmen, Mr Page and Mr Berse, representing Mr Graucob's slot machine business in City Road, London, came to visit her. She was persuaded to purchase a cigarette machine and signed a document entitled 'Sales Agreement', which stated:

"Please forward me as soon as possible: One Six Column Junior Ilam Automatic Machine ... which I agree to purchase from you on the terms stated below...."

Further along, in small print, an exclusion clause was stated:

"This agreement contains all the terms and conditions under which I agree to purchase the machine specified above, and any express or implied condition, statement, or warranty, statutory or otherwise not stated herein is hereby excluded. H. M. L'Estrange."

She did not read the document. She was supposed to pay for the machine in instalments. But after machine was delivered it got jammed and did not work, despite mechanics coming to fix it. Miss L'Estrange thus refused to continue paying her installments and brought an action in the Carnarvonshire County Court at Llandudno for the sums already paid, arguing the machine was not fit for purpose. Mr Graucob contended that any warranties for fitness were expressly excluded by the contractual agreement she signed.

== Judgment ==
=== County Court ===
The judge held, following Lord Herschell LC in Richardson, Spence & Co v Rowntree, that Mr Graucob was not entitled to rely on the exclusion clause. Lord Herschell had asked three questions: (1) Did the plaintiff know that there was writing or printing on the document? (2) Did she know that the writing or printing contained conditions relating to the terms of the contract? (3) Did the defendants do what was reasonably sufficient to give the plaintiff notice of the conditions? The judge held that question (3) was not satisfied.

Mr Graucob appealed. Alfred Thompson Denning, at that time a barrister, represented F Graucob Ltd. Fifty years later, as Master of the Rolls, Denning described the case as emblematic of a "bleak winter for our law of contract" in his judgment on George Mitchell (Chesterhall) Ltd v Finney Lock Seeds Ltd.

=== Court of Appeal ===
Scrutton LJ found that the exclusion clause formed part of the contract. It was immaterial that L'Estrange had not read the clause. The fact that she signed it meant that she was bound by it. She is deemed to have read and agreed to the terms of the contract.

The present case is not a ticket case, and it is distinguishable from the ticket cases. In Parker v. South Eastern Ry. Co. Mellish LJ laid down in a few sentences the law which is applicable to this case. He there said:

"In an ordinary case, where an action is brought on a written agreement which is signed by the defendant, the agreement is proved by proving his signature, and, in the absence of fraud, it is wholly immaterial that he has not read the agreement and does not know its contents."

Having said that, he goes on to deal with the ticket cases, where there is no signature to the contractual document, the document being simply handed by the one party to the other:

"The parties may, however, reduce their agreement into writing, so that the writing constitutes the sole evidence of the agreement, without signing it; but in that case there must be evidence independently of the agreement itself to prove that the defendant has assented to it. In that case, also, if it is proved that the defendant has assented to the writing constituting the agreement between the parties, it is, in the absence of fraud, immaterial that the defendant had not read the agreement and did not know its contents."

In cases in which the contract is contained in a railway ticket or other unsigned document, it is necessary to prove that an alleged party was aware, or ought to have been aware, of its terms and conditions. These cases have no application when the document has been signed. When a document containing contractual terms is signed, then, in the absence of fraud, or, I will add, misrepresentation, the party signing it is bound, and it is wholly immaterial whether he has read the document or not.

Maugham LJ concurred, though expressing his regret at the result. He held he was bound to do so. He said the only two possibilities were that the document was signed non est factum, or that the document was induced to be signed by a misrepresentation.

There can be no dispute as to the soundness in law of the statement of Mellish LJ in Parker v South Eastern Ry Co, which has been read by my learned brother, to the effect that where a party has signed a written agreement it is immaterial to the question of his liability under it that he has not read it and does not know its contents. That is true in any case in which the agreement is held to be an agreement in writing.

[...]

In this case it is, in my view, an irrelevant circumstance that the plaintiff did not read, or hear of, the parts of the sales document which are in small print, and that document should have effect according to its terms. I may add, however, that I could wish that the contract had been in a simpler and more usual form. It is unfortunate that the important clause excluding conditions and warranties is in such small print.

== Significance ==
The case still holds significance, not because it would be decided the same today in relation to a consumer, but because it establishes the basic principle that one is bound by their signature, as a general starting point. This is particularly important among businesses. If the same facts arose again today, the case would be regulated by unfair terms legislation, and Miss L'Estrange would have won, despite having signed. The Sale of Goods Act 1979 section 14(3) implies that goods for sale have a warranty from the seller as to their fitness. Between two businesses dealing as commercial parties of equal bargaining strength, this term could be excluded. But when one party is a consumer, the Unfair Contract Terms Act 1977 section 6(2)(a) stipulates that the warranty about fitness cannot be excluded. So Graucob would have been in breach of contract for providing a faulty machine in any event.

In any event, one commentator, Spencer, argued that Graucob's representatives knew Miss L’Estrange was making a mistake, and therefore should not have won. He argued refusal to apply the law on unilateral mistake where there is a signature comes from misunderstanding the parol evidence rule and non est factum rules.

In the Canadian case, Tilden Rent-A-Car Co. v. Clendenning, the Ontario Court of Appeal held the signature would only bind if it was reasonable for the party relying on the signed document to believe the signer assented to onerous terms (i.e. unlike Grogan, where the document is intended to have contractual effect). By contrast, in 2004 in Toll (FGCT) Pty Ltd v Alphapharm Pty Ltd, the High Court of Australia challenged the Clendenning decision robustly and affirmed L'Estrange. In the UK, in Peekay Intermark Ltd v Australia and New Zealand Banking Group Ltd, Moore-Bick LJ was at pains to emphasise that L’Estrange set out 'an important principle of English law which underpins the whole of commercial life; any erosion of it would have serious repercussions'.

Lord Denning talked about this case in his memoirs, in the context of legal reporting in that era. Denning wrote: "The reporter of L’Estrange v Graucob did not think much of the decision. He didn’t record it in the law reports. But my company had it privately printed: and I went around the County Courts of England winning case after case most unrighteously for the Company."

== See also ==
- George Mitchell (Chesterhall) Ltd v Finney Lock Seeds Ltd
- Autoclenz Ltd v Belcher [2011] UKSC 41
