= Deckchair =

Portable folding leisure chair

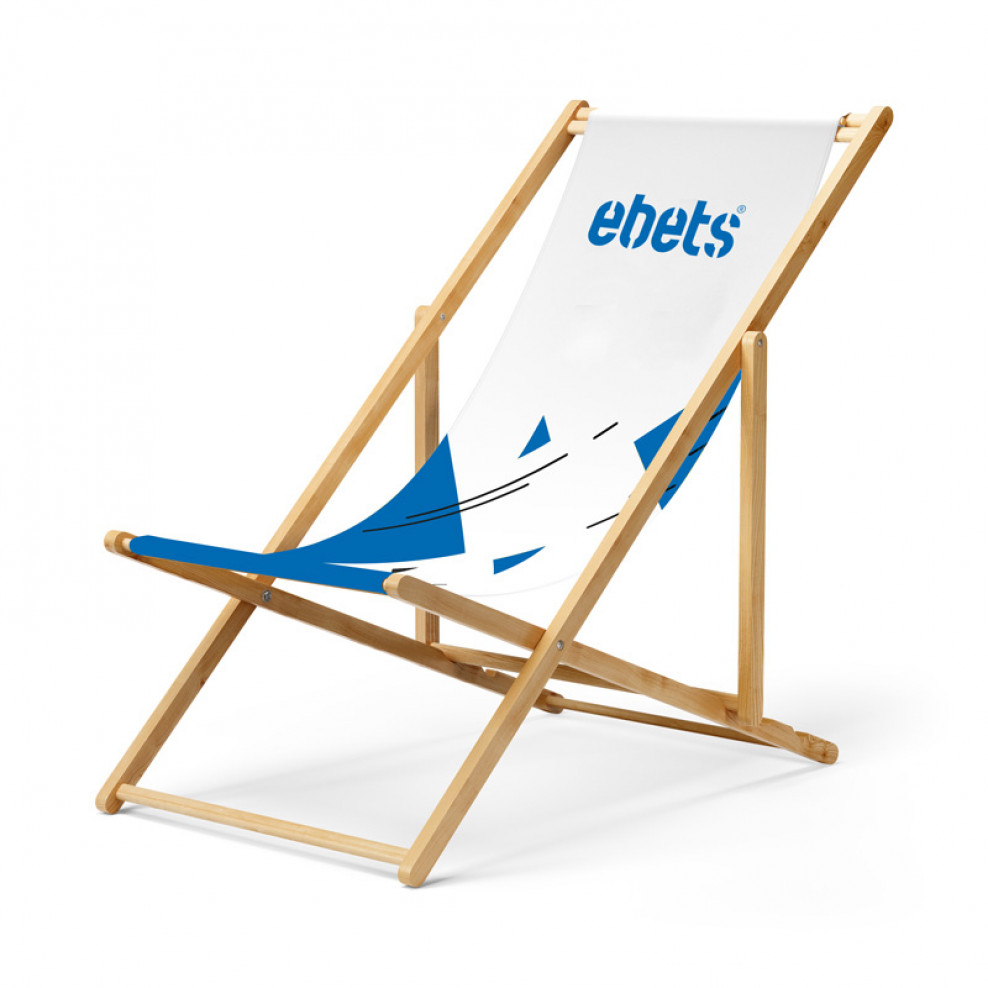
A deckchair

A deckchair (or deck chair) is a simple folding chair, usually with a folding frame and a single strip of canvas as the seat and back(backrest). Deckchairs are usually used on a ship deck, on the beach, or in the garden.

The term may now denote, sometimes, a portable folding chair, with a single strip of fabric or vinyl. Different versions may have an extended seat, meant to be used as a leg rest, whose height may be adjustable; and may also have arm rests.

== History and usage ==
In Northern Europe, the remains of folding chairs have been found dating back to the Bronze Age. Foldable chairs were also used in Ancient Egypt, Greece and Rome. During the Middle Ages, the folding chair was widely used as a liturgical furniture piece – part of the standing of a bishop was his cathedra (official chair or throne), which was housed in his cathedral (church which housed his throne) – but, since his duties inevitably meant him travelling around his diocese from time to time, an easily transportable version of his cathedra was a standard part of his luggage. Often this took the form of a folding stool (virtually identical to those used by ancient Roman generals and administrators), but several folding or dismantle-able armchairs were devised - of which the Glastonbury chair is the most famous. Its rediscovery in the early 19th century was possibly influential in the development of many folding chairs in the 19th century (despite the fact it is actually not a folding chair as such), certainly many reproduction copies of it were made..

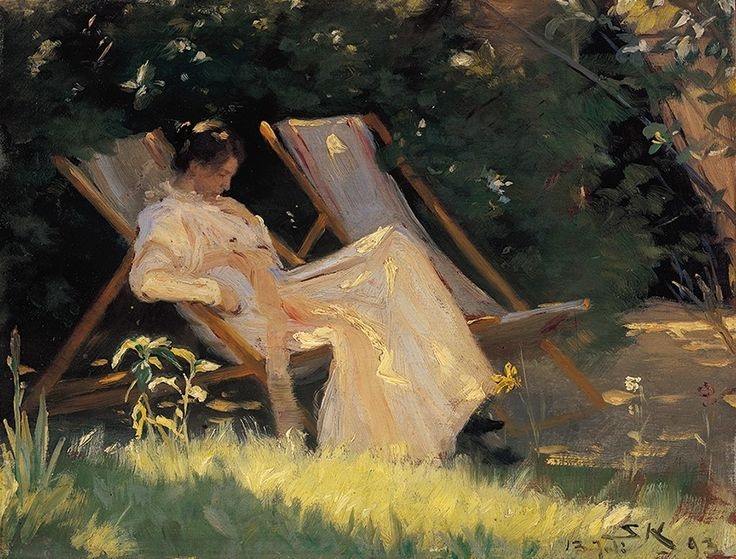
Deckchairs in 1894

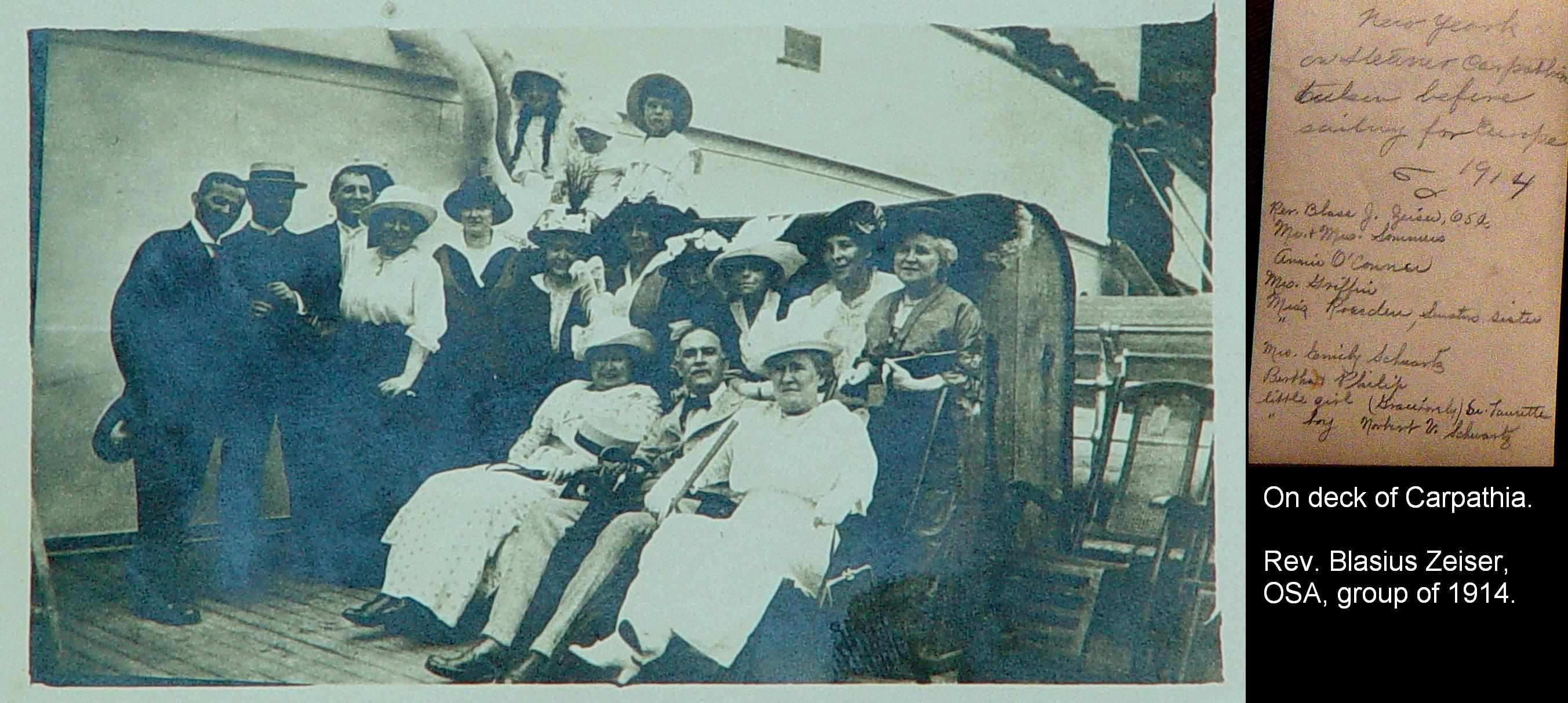
On-deck image of passengers on RMS Carpathia during a 1914 overseas tour led by Father Blasius Zeiser

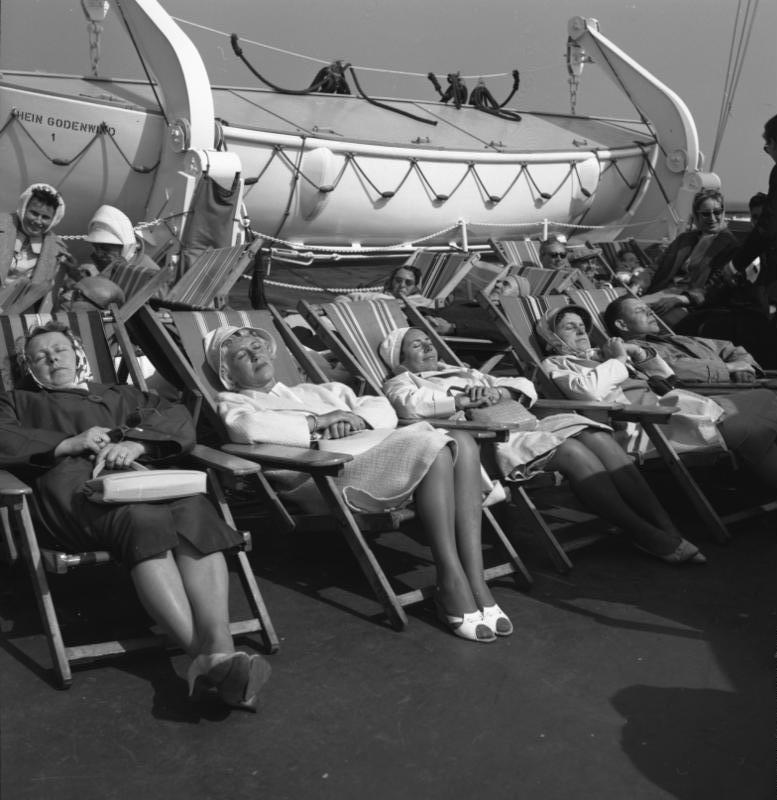
Traditional deckchairs in 1961. Its traditional use. Passengers relaxing on deckchairs on board a German ship

In the United States, an early patent for a folding chair was by John Cham in 1855. Folding wooden chairs with woven or cane seats and backs, of the type now known in the UK as "steamer chairs", began to be used on ocean liner decks from about the 1860s, and were known at the time as "deck chairs". It is unclear whether they were first made in the US or Britain. In England, John Thomas Moore (1864-1929) took out a patent for adjustable and portable folding chairs in 1886, and started manufacturing them in Macclesfield. Moore made two types: the Waverley, described as "the best ship or lawn tennis chair", and the Hygienic, which was a rocking chair "valuable for those with sluggish and constipated bowels".

Early versions of the deck chair were made of two rectangular wooden frames hinged together, with a third rectangle to maintain it upright. A rectangular piece of canvas, of the type used in hammocks, was attached to two of the wooden rectangles to provide a seat and support. The use of a single broad strip of canvas, originally olive green in colour but later usually of brightly coloured stripes, has been credited to a British inventor named Atkins in the late 19th century, although advertisements of 1882 for a similar design refer to it as "The Yankee Hammock Chair", implying an American origin. Other sources refer to it as the "Brighton beach chair" or "chaise transatlantique" ("chaise transat"). The term 'deck' chair was used in the novels of Edith Nesbit in the 1880s, and passengers on P&O liners in the 1890s were encouraged to take their own on board. The classic deckchair can only be locked in one position. Later, the strips of wood going toward the back were lengthened and equipped with supports so that there were several possible sitting positions. A removable footrest can also add to the comfort of the user.

Folding deckchairs became widely popular in the late 19th and early 20th centuries. During the golden age of ocean liner travel, the deckchairs upon ships' decks were sometimes reserved for particular passengers for whom crew would attach a paperboard name tag to the wicker seat-back. Such a tag is visible on an empty deckchair near the center in a famous 1912 photo showing survivors of the RMS Titanic disaster after rescue while they rest on the deck of RMS Carpathia. The same system was in use aboard Carpathia two years later; a reservation tag is visible on the empty deckchair in the lower right of a 1914 photo. The deckchairs shown on some of those photographs are of the more solid "steamer chair" type, rather than the portable canvas-seated chairs. The Titanic carried 600 such wooden chairs; six were known to survive, of which one was sold in 2001 for £35,000.

The hiring out of deckchairs, on an hourly or daily basis, became established in British seaside resorts, often for use on piers and promenades, in the early 20th century. They were also often used in large public parks such as Hyde Park, and for spectators at informal sporting events such as local cricket matches. With the widespread availability of lighter and even more portable forms of seating later in the century, the use of deckchairs declined. In one of the largest English resorts, Blackpool, 68,000 deckchairs were rented out in 2003, at £1.50 a day, but tourism officers suggested that they should be phased out, except on the piers themselves, because they were a reminder of the era of "cloth caps", and had "had their time in the 50s and 60s".

== Use ==
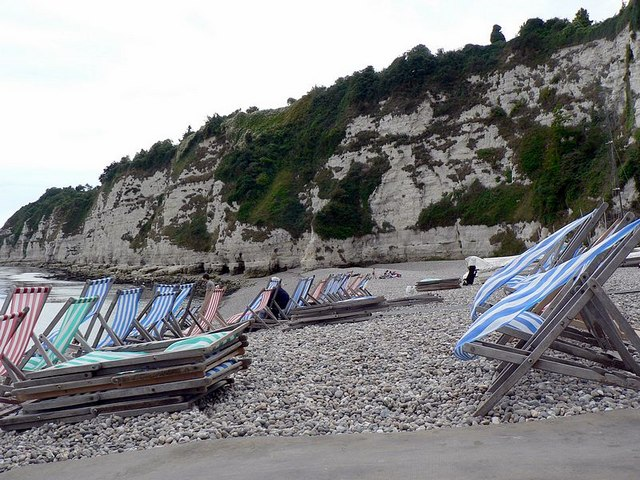
Deckchairs on beach at Beer, Devon, England, both open and stacked, in 2007

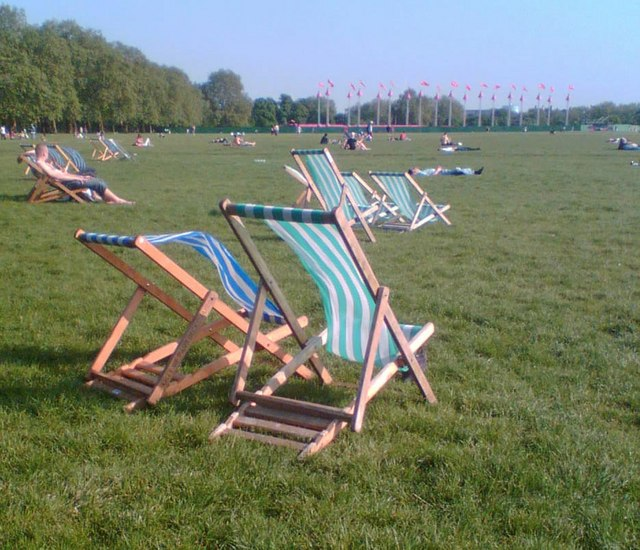
Deckchairs in Hyde Park, London, in 2008

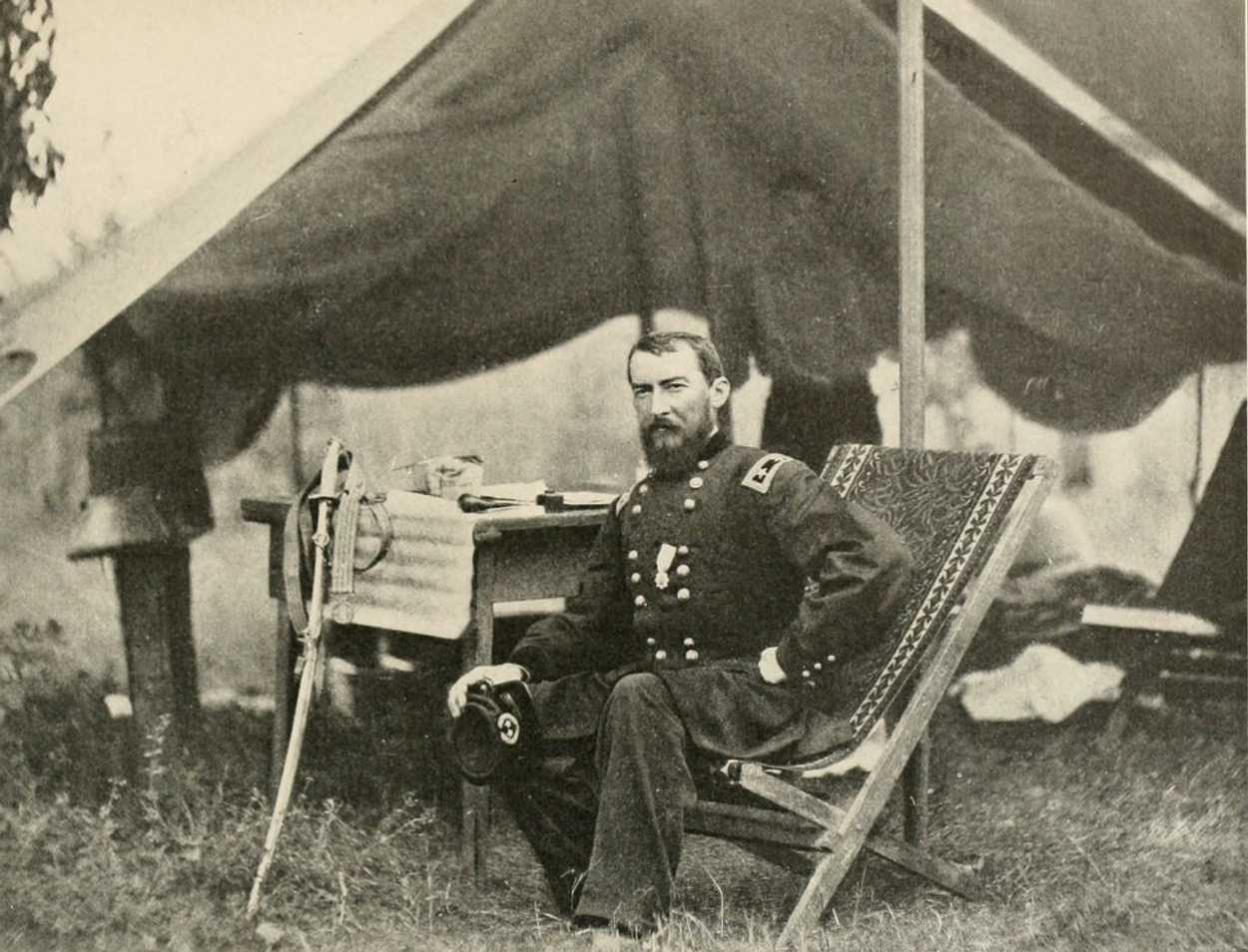
U.S. Civil War Union Cavalry General Philip Sheridan on campaign

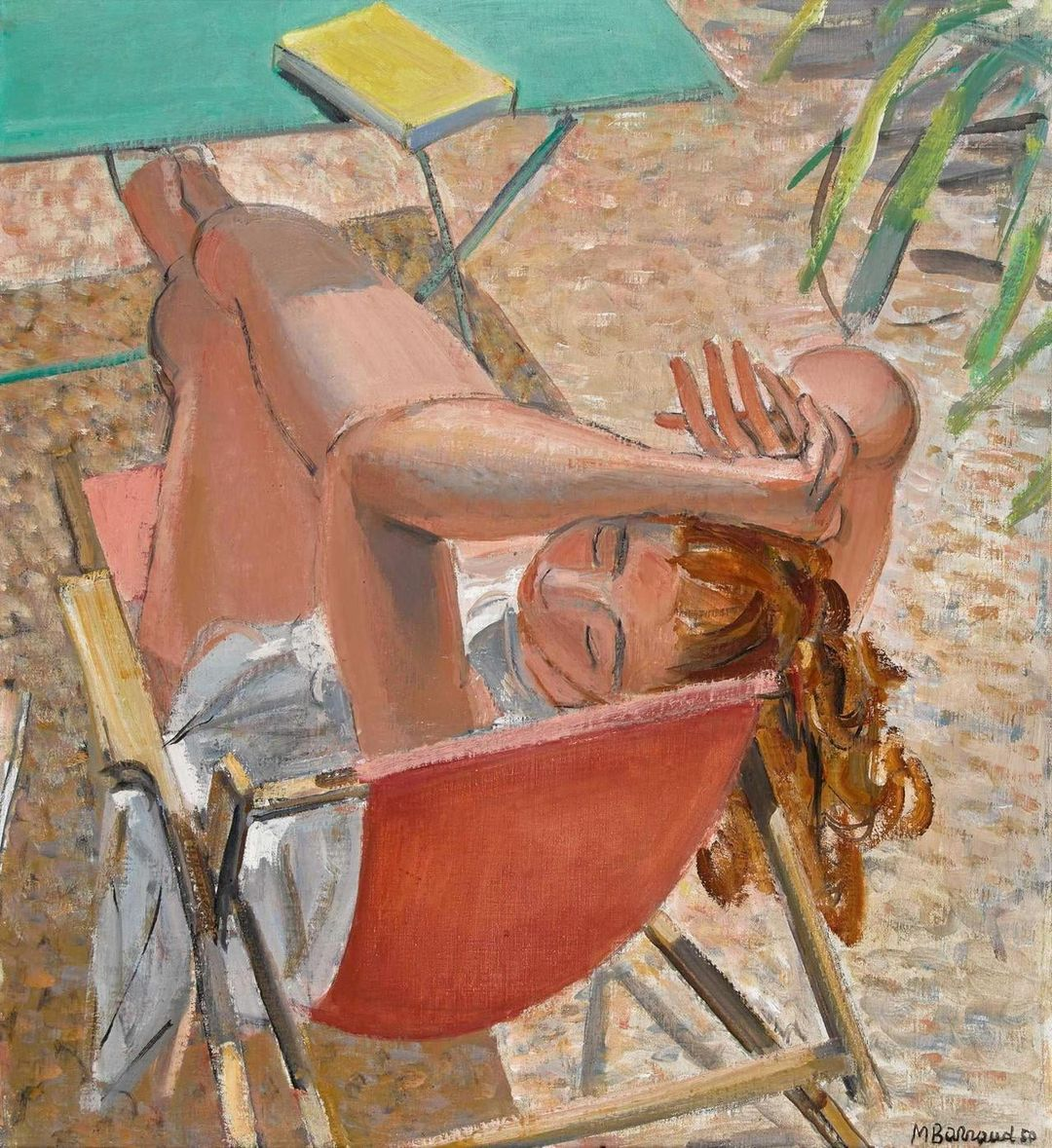
Siesta

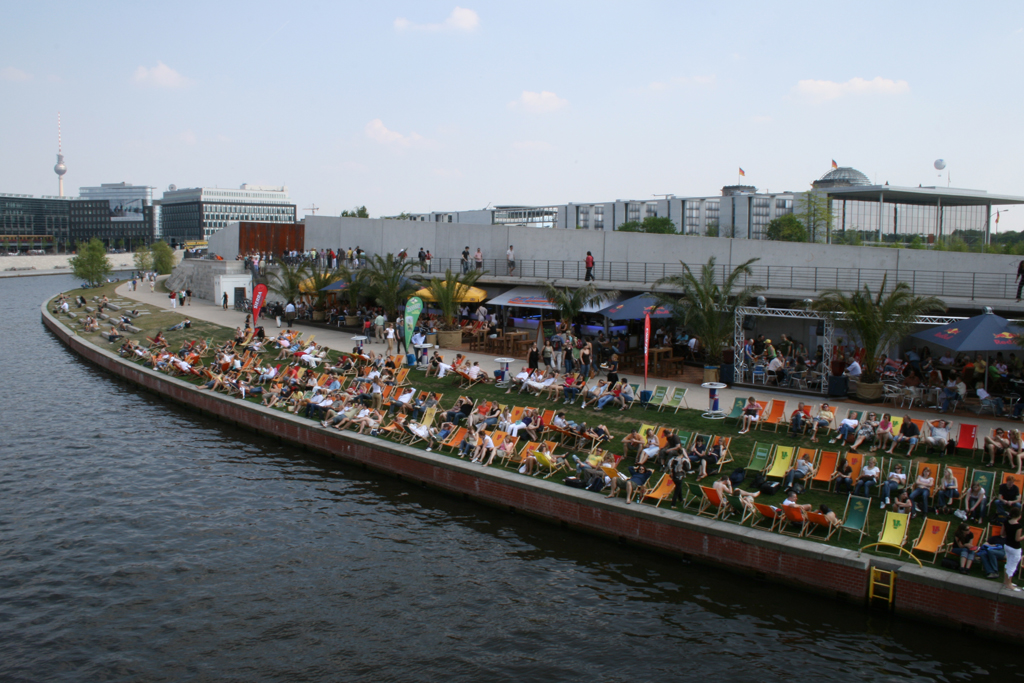
People relaxing on deckchairs at the River Spree near Berlin Hauptbahnhof, Berlin 2007

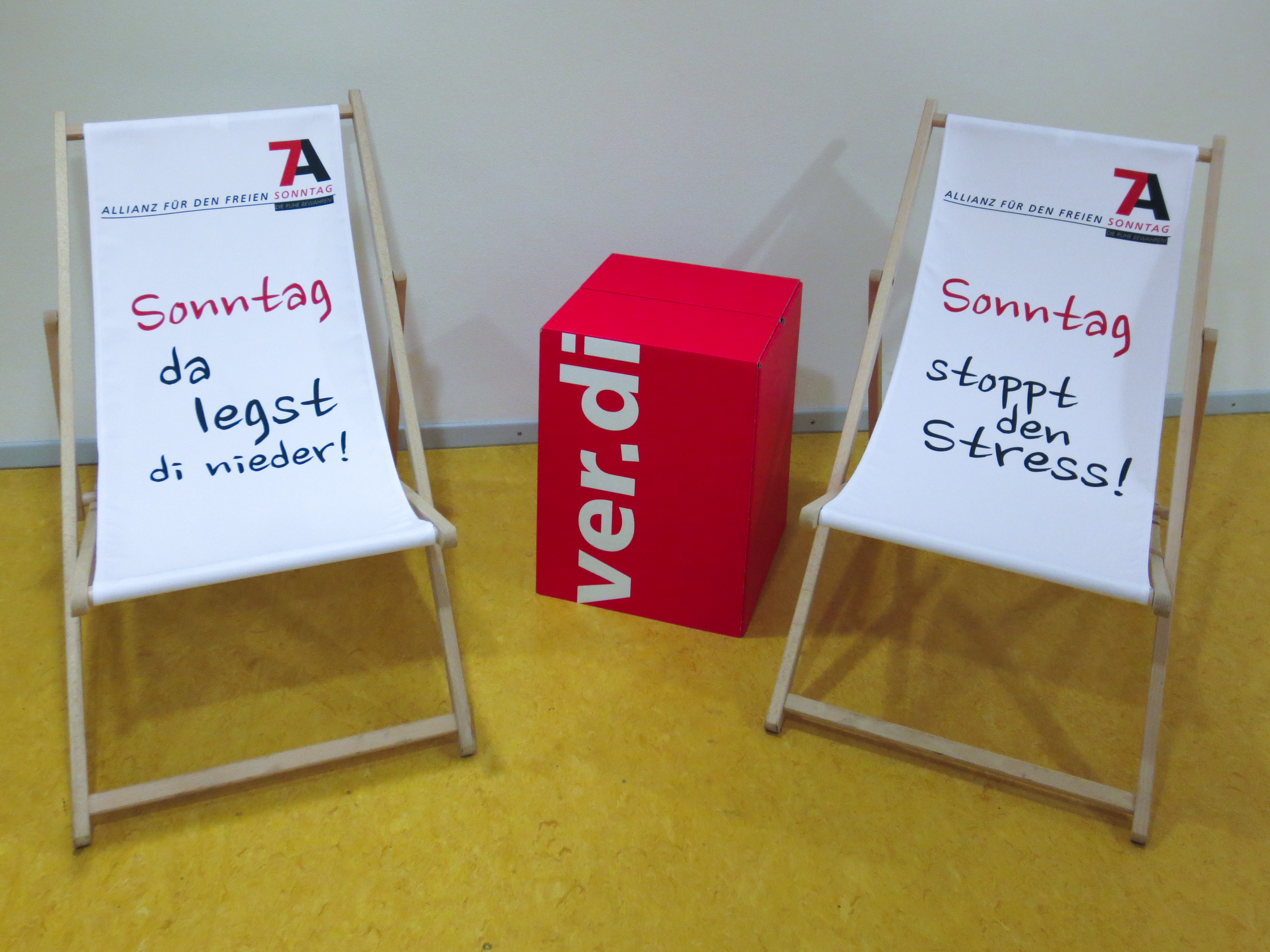
Deckchairs used to show messages

== Versions ==
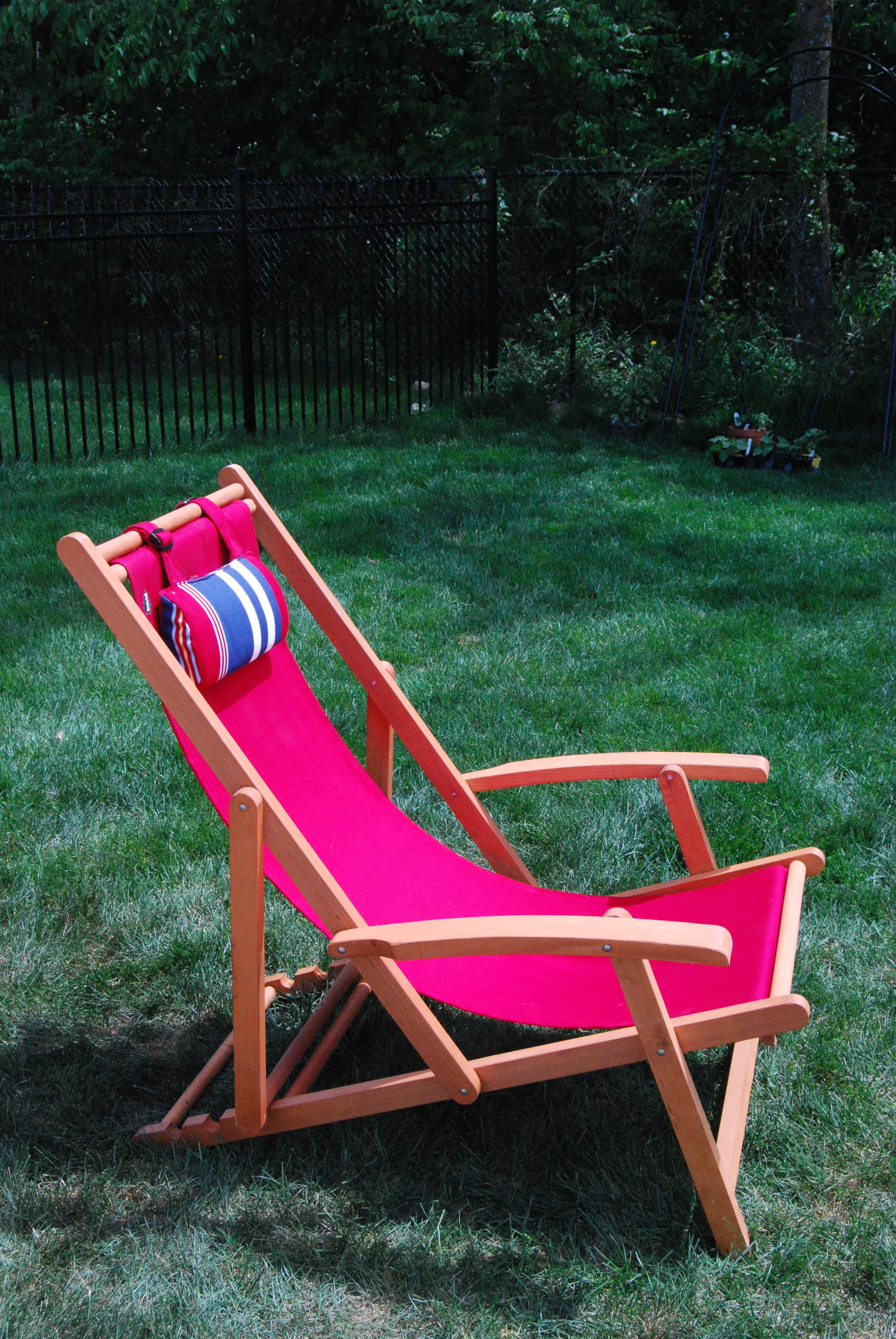
Deckchair with armrests and padded head rest

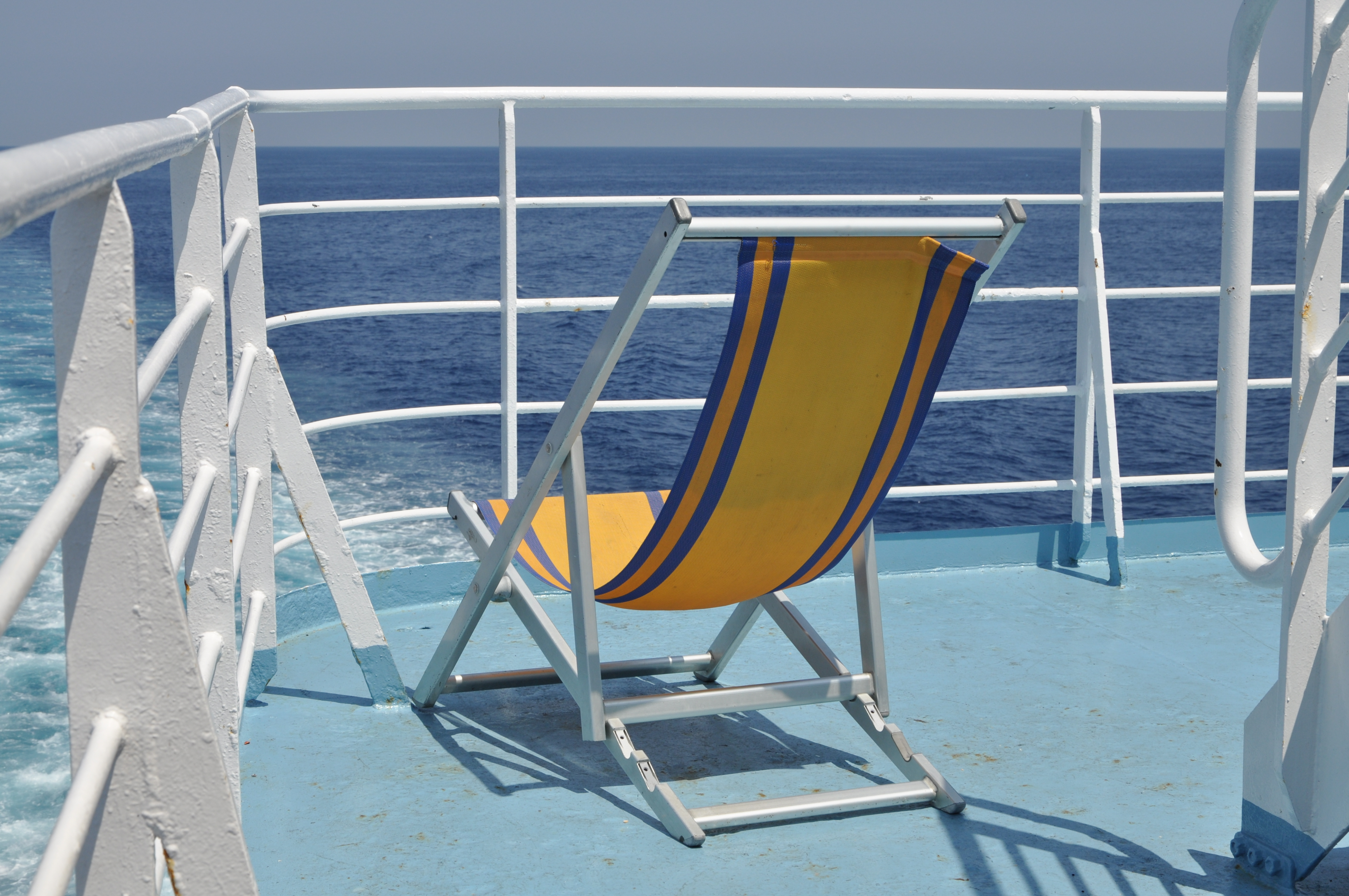
Aluminium frame

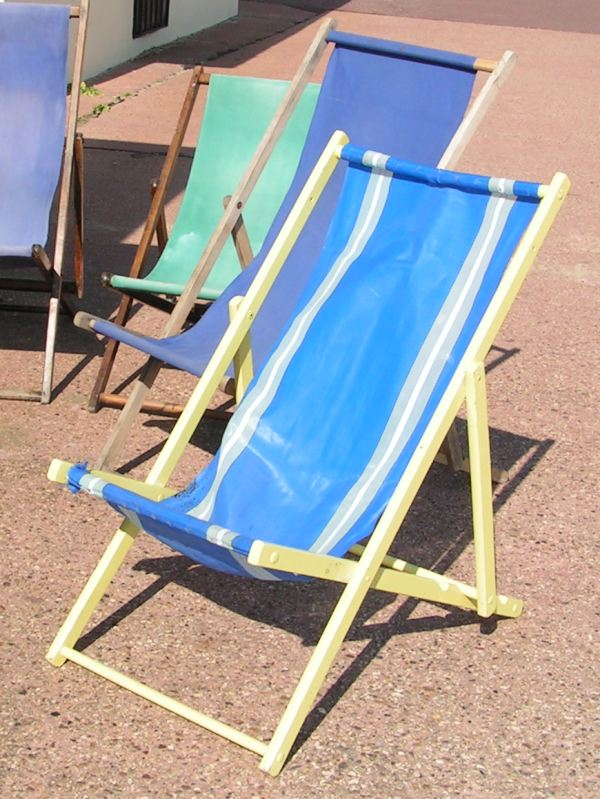
Different colors

=== Sunlounger ===
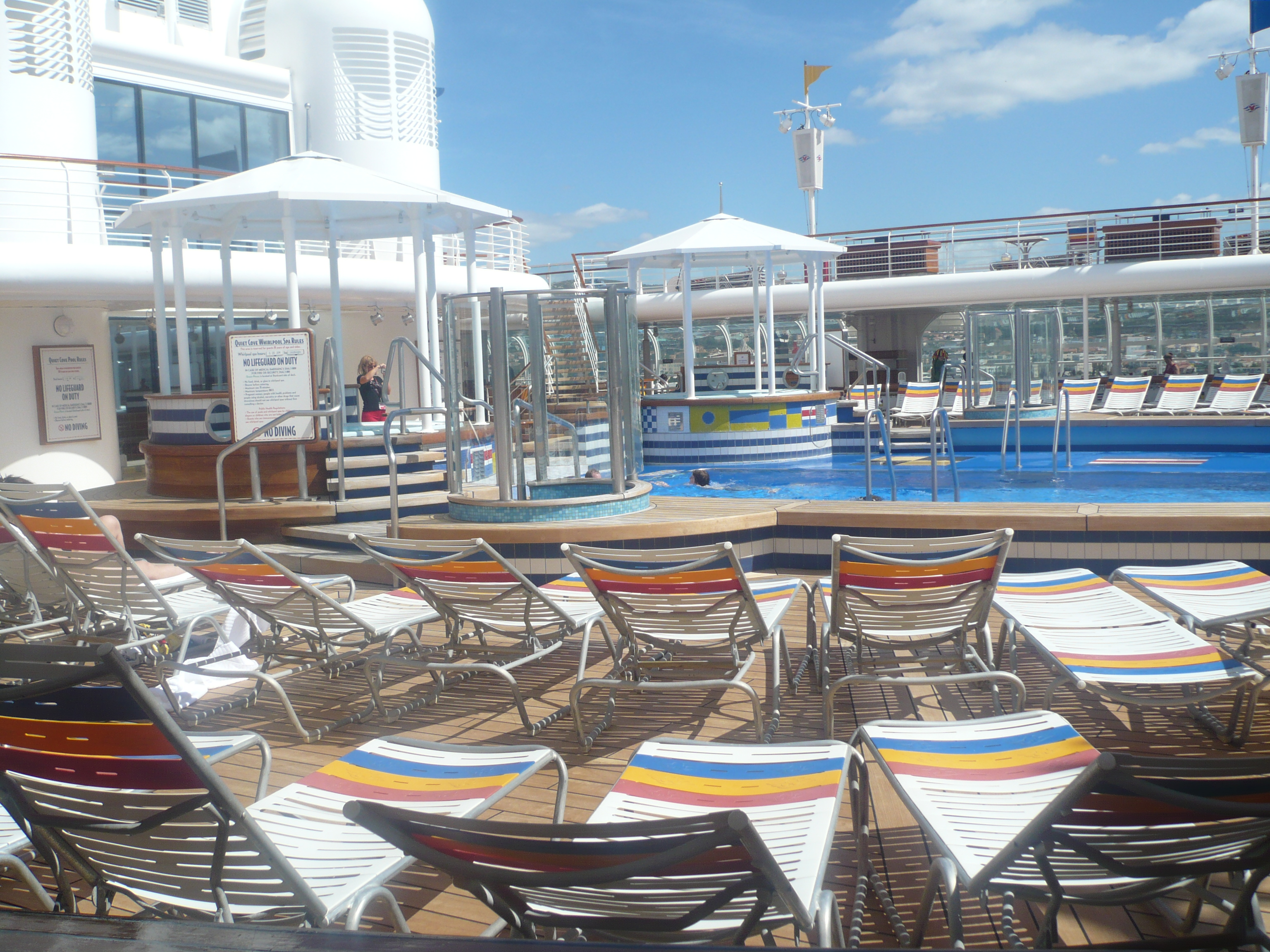
Sunloungers by a swimming pool

A sunlounger is somewhat like a deckchair, and bed-like in nature. The rear surface can be tilted up to allow the user to sit up and read, or it can be reclined to a flat surface to allow sleeping in the horizontal position.

== See also ==
- Chapelton v Barry Urban District Council
- Folding chair
- List of chairs
