= George Mellish =

English barrister and judge (1814–1877)

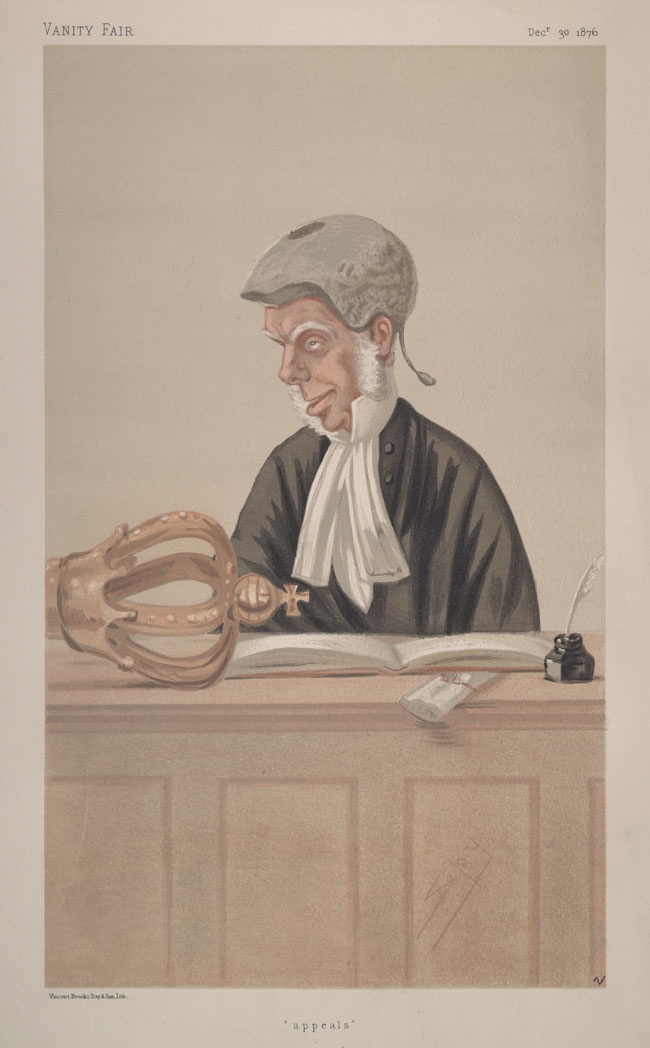
George Mellish, caricature by "Spy" in Vanity Fair, 30 December 1876

Sir George Mellish, PC (19 December 1814 – 15 June 1877) was an English barrister, judge of the Court of Appeal in Chancery, and member of the Judicial Committee of the Privy Council.

== Early life ==
Born at East Tuddenham, Norfolk, Mellish was the second son of the Very Rev. Edward Mellish, DD, Rector of the parish, who afterwards became Dean of Hereford, by his marriage to Elizabeth Jane Leigh, the daughter of the Rev. William Leigh, an earlier Dean of Hereford. His mother was a cousin of George Canning, who stood as godfather to Mellish. His paternal grandfather was William Mellish, of Blyth Hall and Hodsock Priory, Nottinghamshire.

Mellish attended Eton, where he fagged for William Gladstone, participated in the Debating Society and was a "wet bob", a sculler on the river. He then went up to University College, Oxford, where he was a debater in the Oxford Union. In 1836, he earned a BA with a second class in classical honours.

== Legal career ==
After Oxford, Mellish joined Lincoln's Inn and served his pupillage to a variety of notable lawyers. He practised as a special pleader for several years. In 1848, he was called to the bar and began practising on the Northern Circuit. In 1860 he was appointed Queen's Counsel.

On 4 August 1870, Mellish was appointed as Lord Justice of the Court of Appeal in Chancery. The appointment was recommended by Prime Minister Gladstone, who had been Mellish's fag-master at Eton, although Gladstone had apparently forgotten the connection by the time of the appointment. Mellish's appointment to the Chancery Court of Appeal was somewhat unusual, as he had practised almost entirely in the common law courts, not in equity. On 12 August 1870, he was sworn of the Privy Council and was afterwards knighted. His appointment to the Privy Council entitled him to sit as a member of the Judicial Committee of the Privy Council, at that time the court of last resort for the British Empire beyond the seas.

He was one of the judges in the 1877 case Parker v South Eastern Rly Co.

== Illness and death ==
Mellish was a lifelong sufferer from serious gout. One of the judges before whom he appeared later wrote "I have seen him arguing a difficult case before us while he was absolutely writhing with pain". The illness compelled him on occasion to take absences from the bench.

Mellish died at his residence in Lowndes Square, Westminster, on 15 June 1877, aged 62. There is a memorial to him in the parish church of St Mary and St Martin, Blyth, Nottinghamshire.

He had outlived his elder brother, William Leigh Mellish (1813–1864), who became a British Army officer and retired as Lieutenant Colonel of the Sherwood Foresters, having married Margaret Ann, a daughter of Sir Samuel Cunard, Bart.
