= Thompson v London, Midland and Scottish Rly Co =

Thompson v London, Midland and Scottish Rly Co Ltd
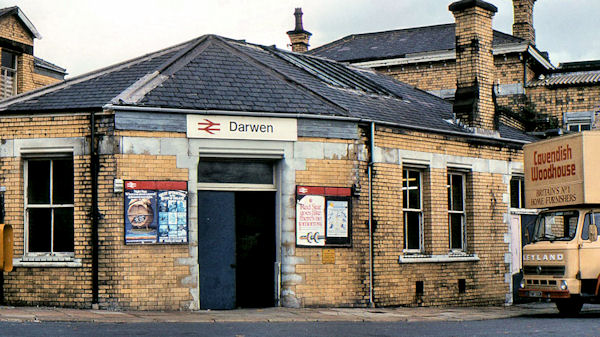
- Court: Court of Appeal

Keywords
- Contract, exclusion clause

Thompson v London, Midland and Scottish Railway Co Ltd [1930] 1 KB 41 is an English contract law case, concerning the exclusion of liability. It was described by Lord Denning MR in George Mitchell (Chesterhall) Ltd v Finney Lock Seeds Ltd as part of "a bleak winter for our law of contract." Although the same decision would not be reached today because of the application of the Unfair Contract Terms Act 1977, English courts continue to assess on an objective basis whether reasonable notice has been given of terms and conditions so as to incorporate them in the contract.

== Facts ==
Mrs Thompson slipped on a ramp while disembarking a train operated by London, Midland and Scottish Railway at 10pm, from Manchester to Darwen, and was injured. The train had pulled up just past the platform, and so the ramp she stepped out on was slippery. A special jury found the railway to have been negligent, and so Mrs Thompson sought damages for personal injury. She had been given an excursion ticket by her niece, which said "Excursion. For conditions see back" which in turn referred to the Railway's timetables and excursion bills. The timetables could be bought for sixpence said the tickets were issued on condition that holders "shall have no rights of action against the company ... in respect of ... injury (fatal or otherwise) ... however caused." A jury found that the company had not taken reasonable steps to bring the conditions to the notice of Mrs Thompson and awarded damages. But then the judge, as a matter of law, held that when the ticket was accepted the contract was complete, and so the jury was not entitled to find as they did. Mrs Thompson could not read.

== Judgment ==
Lord Harnworth MR held that, regardless of whether Mrs Thompson could read, she was bound by the contract, and the indication of further conditions by reference was sufficient notice. He said "we feel no difficulty in coming to a conclusion."

Lawrence LJ and Sankey LJ concurred.

== See also ==
- English contract law
