= Interfoto Picture Library Ltd v Stiletto Visual Programmes Ltd =

English contract law case

Interfoto Ltd v Stiletto Ltd
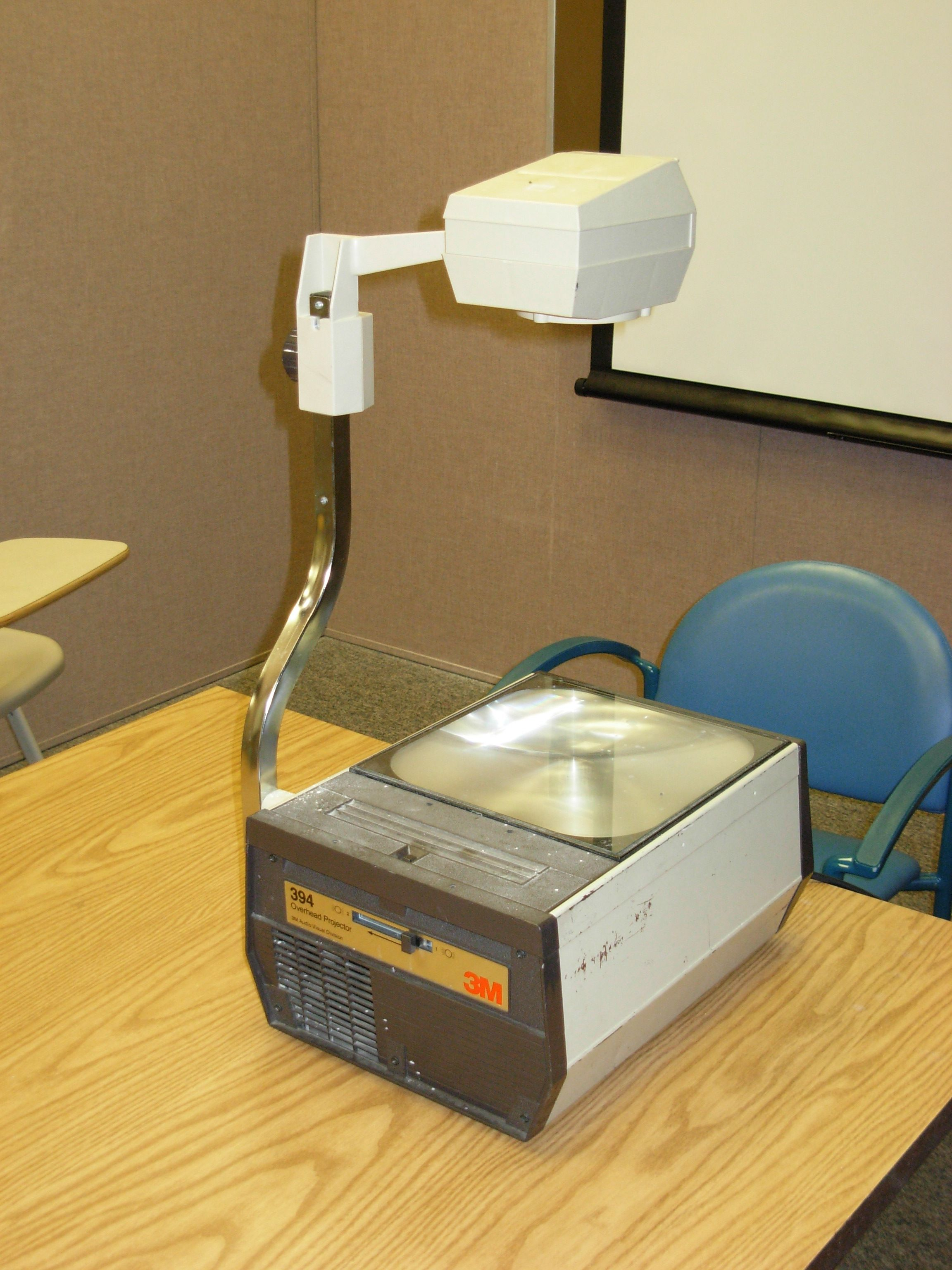
- Court: Court of Appeal
- Full case name: Interfoto Picture Library Ltd v Stiletto Visual Programmes Ltd
- Citations: [1987] EWCA Civ 6, [1989] QB 433

Case opinions
- Dillon LJ, Bingham LJ

Interfoto Picture Library Ltd v Stiletto Visual Programmes Ltd [1987] EWCA Civ 6 is an English contract law case on onerous clauses and the rule of common law that reasonable notice of them must be given to a contracting party in order that they be effective. It also addressed, but did not decide, the position of onerous clauses as disguised penalties (which are ineffective under common law).

== Facts ==
Interfoto delivered 47 photographic transparencies to Stiletto in a jiffy bag. Stiletto was planning to use them for a presentation, but in the event it did not. It never opened the transparency bag or read Interfoto's standard terms and conditions, which were inside the bag. Condition 2 said there was a holding fee of £5 per transparency for each day over fourteen days. After around a month, Interfoto sent a bill for £3,783.50.

== Judgment ==
The Court of Appeal held that the holding fee was ineffective. Dillon LJ said that a "particularly onerous or unusual" term must have special notice. However, Interfoto was entitled to a small restitutory charge of £3.50 per transparency per week for their holding.

Bingham LJ held that the clause was not valid. It was "a venial period of delay [for] an inordinate liability". The issue was, he said,

whether it would in all the circumstances be fair (or reasonable) to hold a party bound by any conditions ... of an unusual and stringent nature ... The defendants are not to be relieved of that liability because they did not read the condition, although doubtless they did not; but in my judgment they are to be relieved because the plaintiffs did not do what was necessary to draw this unreasonable and extortionate clause fairly to their attention.

He advocated embracing good faith - "showing up your cards", "fair dealing", and so on. On penalty clauses, Bingham LJ noted at the end of his decision,

In reaching the conclusion I have expressed I would not wish to be taken as deciding that condition 2 was not challengeable as a disguised penalty clause. This point was not argued before the judge nor raised in the notice of appeal. It was accordingly not argued before us. I have accordingly felt bound to assume, somewhat reluctantly, that condition 2 would be enforceable if fully and fairly brought to the defendants' attention.

== See also ==
- O'Brien v MGN Ltd [2002] CLC 33, [23], where Hale LJ said that the words "onerous or unusual" are not "terms of art"
- OFT v Abbey [2008] EWHC 875 (Comm)
- Bates & Others v Post Office Ltd (Judgment No 3), [2019] EWHC 606 (QB): where the judgment on "common issues" made several references to Interfoto
