= Exclusion clause =

Exclusion clauses and limitation clauses are terms in a contract which seek to restrict the rights of the parties to the contract.

Traditionally, the district courts have sought to limit the operation of exclusion clauses. In addition to numerous common law rules limiting their operation, in England and Wales Consumer Contracts Regulations 1999. The Unfair Contract Terms Act 1977 applies to all contracts, but the Unfair Terms in Consumer Contracts Regulations 1999, unlike the common law rules, do differentiate between contracts between businesses and contracts between business and consumer, so the law seems to explicitly recognize the greater possibility of exploitation of the consumer by businesses.

== Types of exclusion clause ==
There are various methods by which a party may seek to exclude or mitigate liability by use of a contractual term:

- True exclusion clause: The clause recognizes a potential breach of contract, and then excuses liability for the breach. Alternatively, the clause is constructed in such a way it only includes reasonable care to perform duties on one of the parties.
- Limitation clause: The clause places a limit on the amount that can be claimed for a breach of contract, regardless of the actual loss.
- Time limitation: The clause states that an action for a claim must be commenced within a certain period of time or the cause of action becomes extinguished.

Ewan McKendrick notes that exclusion clauses and their interpretation fall into two classes: those which define a party's obligations, specifically identifying when a certain obligation will not arise, and those which provide a defence for a party who has failed to perform an obligation. Traditionally, he says, the courts have adopted a defensive interpretation rather than a defining one.

== Term must be incorporated ==
The courts have traditionally held that exclusion clauses only operate if they are actually part of the contract. There seem to be three methods of incorporation:

- Incorporation by signature: according to L'Estrange v Graucob, if the clause is written on a document which has been signed by all parties, then it is part of the contract. If a document has not been signed, any exception clause which it contains will only be incorporated if the party relying on the clause (the 'proferens') can show that he took reasonable steps to bring it to the attention of the other party before the contract was made. In somewhat of a contradiction, that is not to say that the proferens actually has to show that the other person read the clause or understood it (except where the clause is particularly unusual or onerous). It is not even necessary to show that the attention of that particular person was actually drawn to it. It is somewhat like the 'reasonable man' test in tort: the party trying to rely on the clause needs to take reasonable steps to bring it to the attention of the reasonable person.
- Incorporation by notice: the general rule, as provided in Parker v SE Railway, is that an exclusion clause will have been incorporated into the contract if the person relying on it took reasonable steps to draw it to the other party's attention. Thornton v Shoe Lane Parking seems to indicate that the wider the clause, the more the party relying on it will have had to have done to bring it to the other party's attention. The notice must be given before formation of the contract as illustrated in Olley v Marlborough Court Ltd.
- Incorporation by previous course of dealings: according to McCutcheon v David MacBrayne Ltd, terms (including exclusion clauses) may be incorporated into a contract if course of dealings between the parties were "regular and consistent". What this means usually depends on the facts, however, the courts have indicated that equality of bargaining power between the parties may be taken into account.

== Judicial control of exclusion clauses ==
=== Strict literal interpretation ===
For an exclusion clause to operate, it must cover the breach (assuming there actually is a breach of contract). If there is, then the type of liability arising is also important. Generally, there are two varieties of liability: strict liability (liability arising due to a state of affairs without the party at breach necessarily being at fault) and liability for negligence (liability arising due to fault).

The courts have a tendency to require the party relying on the clause to have drafted it properly so that it exempts them from the liability arising, and if any ambiguity is present, the courts usually interpret it strictly against the party relying on the clause.

As espoused in Darlington Futures Ltd v Delco Australia Pty Ltd., an Australian High Court case, the meaning of an exclusion clause is construed in its ordinary and natural meaning in the context. Although a court will construe the meaning much like any other ordinary clause in the contract, it needs to examine the clause in light of the contract as a whole. Exclusion clauses should not be subject to a strained construction in order to reduce the ambit of their operation. The judge in R&B Customs Brokers Co Ltd v United Dominions Trust Ltd refused to allow an exemption clause, of which did cover the nature of the implied term, on the grounds that it did not make specific and explicit reference to that term. (Note: The term in question was the implied term as to fitness for purpose pursuant to the Sale of Goods Act 1979 s14(3).)

=== Reasonableness ===
The terms of a cap on liability must be reasonable. In Ampleforth Abbey Trust v Turner & Townsend Project Management Ltd.' (2012) the High Court found that a cap at "the lower of" either the project management fees paid or a potential damage limitation of £1,000,000 was "unreasonable", particularly as the terms of their appointment required Turner & Townsend to maintain professional liability insurance, presumable costed into their fee, which would cover more of the loss suffered by the client than simply the fees they had paid.

=== Contra proferentem ===
If, after attempting to construe an exclusion clause (or indeed any other contractual term) in accord with its ordinary and natural meaning of the words, there is still ambiguity then (if the clause was imposed by one party upon the other without negotiation) the contra proferentem rule applies. Essentially this means that the clause will be construed against the interests of the person who proposed its inclusion. that is to say, contra (against) the proferens (proposer).

In terms of negligence, the courts have taken the approach that it is unlikely that someone would enter into a contract that allows the other party to evade fault based liability. As a result, if a party wishes exempt his liability for negligence, he must make sure that the other parties understand that. The decision in Canada SS Lines Ltd v. The King held that:

- If the exclusion clauses mention "negligence" explicitly, then liability for negligence is excluded.
- If "negligence" is not mentioned, then liability for negligence is excluded only if the words used in the exclusion clause are wide enough to exclude liability for negligence. If there is any ambiguity, then the contra proferentem rule applies.
- If a claim on another basis can be made other than that of negligence, then it covers that basis instead.

==== Contra proferentem in Australian contract law ====
In Australia, the four corners rule has been adopted in preference to the idea of a "fundamental breach". The court will presume that parties to a contract will not exclude liability for losses arising from acts not authorised under the contract. However, if acts of negligence occur during authorised acts, then the exclusion clauses will still apply.

If the contract is for the carriage of goods, if the path is deviated from what was agreed, any exclusion clauses no longer apply.

In Australia, exclusion clauses have been recognised as valid by the High Court. They do not apply in cases of deliberate breach.

== Statutory control ==
Even if terms included in a contract are deemed to be exclusion or exemption clauses, various jurisdictions have enacted statutory controls, to limit their effect. Under the Australian Consumer Law, section 64 limits exclusion clauses from rendering them from being ineffective against the guarantees of the same act. In the United Kingdom, the Unfair Contract Terms Act 1977 renders many exemption clauses ineffective. The Unfair Terms in Consumer Contracts Regulations 1999 provide further protection for consumers.
