= Chapelton v Barry UDC =

English contract law case

- Court: Court of Appeal
- Full case name: David Chapelton v Barry Urban District Council
- Citation: [1940] 1 KB 532, [1940] 1 All ER 356

Case history
- Prior action: A judgment in favour of Barry UDC

Court membership
- Judges sitting: Slesser LJ; Mackinnon LJ; Goddard LJ

Case opinions
- All three Lords Justices of Appeal

Keywords
- Offer and acceptance, incorporation of express terms, ticket, receipt

Chapelton v Barry Urban District Council [1940] 1 KB 532, the "deckchair case", is an English contract law case on offer and acceptance and exclusion clauses. It stands for the proposition that a display of goods can be an offer and a whole offer, rather than an invitation to treat, and serves as an example for how onerous exclusion clauses can be deemed to not be incorporated in a contract.

== Facts ==
David Chapelton went to a beach with his friend, Miss Andrews, at Cold Knap, a district of Barry in south Wales. There was a pile of deckchairs. A notice next to them said,

"Barry Urban District Council. Cold Knap. Hire of chairs 2d. per session of 3 hours."

It also said tickets should be obtained from attendants. Mr Chapelton took two chairs from an attendant, paid the money and received two tickets. He put them in his pocket. On the tickets was written,

"Available for three hours. Time expires where indicated by cut-off and should be retained and shown on request. The council will not be liable for any accident or damage arising from the hire of the chair."

When Mr Chapelton sat on the chair it gave way, the canvas tearing from the top of the chair. He was injured. The county court judge held the council would have been negligent but that liability was exempted by the ticket. Mr Chapelton appealed.

== Judgment ==
The Court of Appeal upheld Mr Chapelton's claim, overturning the judgment at first instance; it held that there was a valid offer when the chairs were on display, accepted when picked up the chairs from the defendant. Therefore, the ticket was merely a receipt of the contract, and the exclusion clause could not be incorporated as a term, because it was too late. Slesser LJ read the facts and gave his judgment first.

As I read the learned county court judge's judgment (and we have had the advantage of a note taken by Mr. Carey Evans in addition to the summary reasons which the learned county court judge gives for his decision), he said that the plaintiff had sufficient notice of the special contract printed on the ticket and was, accordingly, bound thereby – that is to say, as I understand it, that the learned county court judge has treated this case as a case similar to the many cases which have been tried in reference to conditions printed on tickets, and more particularly, on railway tickets – and he came to the conclusion that the local authority made an offer to hire out this chair to Mr. Chapelton only on certain conditions, which appear on the ticket, namely, that they, the council, would not be responsible for any accident which arose from the use of the chair, and they say that Mr. Chapelton hired the chair on the basis that that was one of the terms of the contract between him and themselves, the local authority.

Questions of this sort are always questions of difficulty and are very often largely questions of fact. In the class of case where it is said that there is a term in the contract freeing railway companies, or other providers of facilities, from liabilities which they would otherwise incur at common law, it is a question as to how far that condition has been made a term of the contract and whether it has been sufficiently brought to the notice of the person entering into the contract with the railway company, or other body, and there is a large number of authorities on that point. In my view, however, the present case does not come within that category at all. I think that the contract here, as appears from a consideration of all the circumstances, was this: The local authority offered to hire chairs to persons to sit upon on the beach, and there was a pile of chairs there standing ready for use by any one who wished to use them, and the conditions on which they offered persons the use of those chairs were stated in the notice which was put up by the pile of chairs, namely, that the sum charged for the hire of a chair was 2d. per session of three hours. I think that was the whole of the offer which the local authority made in this case. They said, in effect: "We offer to provide you with a chair, and if you accept that offer and sit in the chair, you will have to pay for that privilege 2d. per session of three hours."

I think that Mr. Chapelton, in common with other persons who used these chairs, when he took the chair from the pile (which happened to be handed to him by an attendant, but which, I suppose, he might have taken from the pile of chairs himself if the attendant had been going on his rounds collecting money, or was otherwise away) simply thought that he was liable to pay 2d. for the use of the chair. No suggestion of any restriction of the council's liability appeared in the notice which was near the pile of chairs. That, I think, is the proper view to take of the nature of the contract in this case. Then the notice contained these further words: "The public are respectfully requested to obtain tickets properly issued from the automatic punch in their presence from the Chair Attendants." The very language of that "respectful request" shows clearly, to my mind, that for the convenience of the local authority the public were asked to obtain from the chair attendants tickets, which were mere vouchers or receipts showing how long a person hiring a chair is entitled to use that chair. It is wrong, I think, to look at the circumstance that the plaintiff obtained his receipt at the same time as he took his chair as being in any way a modification of the contract which I have indicated. This was a general offer to the general public, and I think it is right to say that one must take into account here that there was no reason why anybody taking one of these chairs should necessarily obtain a receipt at the moment he took his chair – and, indeed, the notice is inconsistent with that, because it "respectfully requests" the public to obtain receipts for their money. It may be that somebody might sit in one of these chairs for one hour, or two hours, or, if the holiday resort was a very popular one, for a longer time, before the attendant came round for his money, or it may be that the attendant would not come to him at all for payment for the chair, in which case I take it there would be an obligation upon the person who used the chair to search out the attendant, like a debtor searching for his creditor, in order to pay him the sum of 2d. for the use of the chair and to obtain a receipt for the 2d. paid.

I think the learned county court judge has misunderstood the nature of this agreement. I do not think that the notice excluding liability was a term of the contract at all, and I find it unnecessary to refer to the different authorities which were cited to us, save that I would mention a passage in the judgment of Mellish L.J. in Parker v. South Eastern Ry. Co., where he points out that it may be that a receipt or ticket may not contain terms of the contract at all, but may be a mere voucher, where he says: "For instance, if a person driving through a turnpike-gate received a ticket upon paying the toll, he might reasonably assume that the object of the ticket was that by producing it he might be free from paying toll at some other turnpike-gate, and might put it in his pocket unread." I think the object of the giving and the taking of this ticket was that the person taking it might have evidence at hand by which he could show that the obligation he was under to pay 2d. for the use of the chair for three hours had been duly discharged, and I think it is altogether inconsistent, in the absence of any qualification of liability in the notice put up near the pile of chairs, to attempt to read into it the qualification contended for. In my opinion, this ticket is no more than a receipt, and is quite different from a railway ticket which contains upon it the terms upon which a railway company agrees to carry the passenger. This, therefore, is not, I think, as Mr. Ryder Richardson has argued, a question of fact for the learned county court judge. I think the learned county court judge as a matter of law has misconstrued this contract, and looking at all the circumstances of the case, has assumed that this condition on the ticket, or the terms upon which the ticket was issued, has disentitled the plaintiff to recover. The class of case which Sankey L.J. dealt with in Thompson v. London, Midland and Scottish Ry. Co., which seems to have influenced the learned county court judge in his decision, is entirely different from that which we have to consider in the present appeal.

This appeal should be allowed.

MacKinnon LJ

I agree that this appeal should be allowed. The learned county court judge decided this case relying upon a dictum of Sankey L.J. when he was speaking of a transaction which was totally different to this one. If a man does an act which constitutes the making of a contract, such as taking a railway ticket, or depositing his bag in a cloak-room, he will be bound by the terms of the document handed to him by the servant of the carriers or bailees; but if he merely pays money for something and receives a receipt for it, or does something which clearly only amounts to that, he cannot be deemed to have entered into a contract in the terms of the words that his creditor has chosen to print on the back of the receipt, unless, of course, the creditor has taken reasonable steps to bring the terms of the proposed contract to the mind of the man. In this case there was no evidence upon which the learned county court judge could find that the defendants had taken any steps to bring the terms of their proposed contract to the mind of the plaintiff. In those circumstances, I am satisfied that the defendants could not rely upon the words on the back of the ticket issued to the plaintiff, and, having admittedly been negligent in regard to the condition of the chair, they had no defence to the plaintiff's cause of action.

Goddard LJ

I agree. In my view the cases which deal with railway tickets, cloak-room tickets, or documents issued by bailees when they take charge of goods, have no analogy to this case. In this case the appellant paid 2d. in order to have the right to sit on a chair on the beach, and he was asked to take a ticket in the form of a receipt for that purpose, and was given a document which shows nothing on the face of it, except that the man had the right to sit in the chair until 7.30 P.M. on the day when the accident occurred and the fact that the ticket was not transferable. I cannot imagine that anybody paying 2d. under those circumstances for the privilege of sitting in a chair on the beach would think for one moment that some conditions were being imposed upon him which would limit his ordinary rights, or that the document he received when paying his 2d. was a contractual document in any shape or form. I think the ticket he received was nothing but a receipt for his 2d. – a receipt which showed him how long he might use the chair. I think the learned judge below was wrong in thinking that the case of Thompson v. London, Midland and Scottish Ry. Co., upon which he seems to have relied, had any bearing on the present case. One must have regard to the facts of the case and the general circumstances of the case. In my opinion, [Thomson] has no bearing at all on this case.

== See also ==
- Pharmaceutical Society of Great Britain v. Boots Cash Chemists (Southern) Ltd.
