= Olley v Marlborough Court Ltd =

1949 English contract law case

Olley v Marlborough Court Hotel
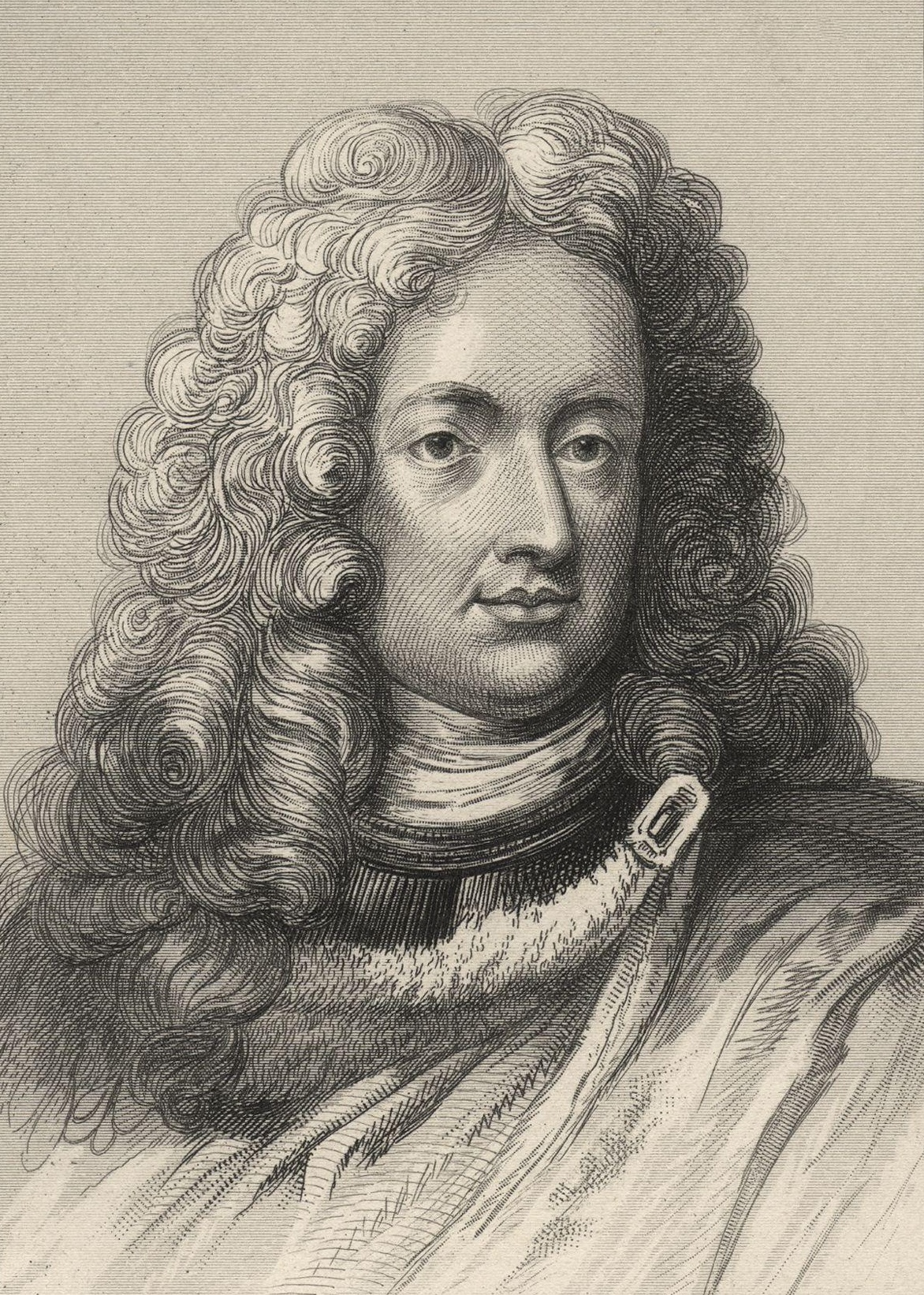
- Court: Court of Appeal
- Citation: [1949] 1 KB 532

Court membership
- Judges sitting: Denning LJ, Singleton LJ and Bucknill LJ

Keywords
- Incorporation, exclusion clause

Olley v Marlborough Court Hotel [1949] 1 KB 532 is an English contract law case on exclusion clauses in contract law. The case stood for the proposition that a representation made by one party cannot become a term of a contract if made after the agreement was made. The representation can only be binding where it was made at the time the contract was formed.

== Facts ==
Mrs Olley was a long-staying resident of the Marlborough Court Hotel, Lancaster Gate, London. As usual she left her room key on a rack behind the reception one day, but when she came back it was gone. Inside her room, her fur coat had been stolen.

A witness called Colonel Crerer, who was sitting in the lounge, saw a person go in and come out again with a parcel fifteen minutes later. The porter had apparently been cleaning a bust of the Duke of Marlborough and failed to notice.

Mrs Olley asked to be repaid for the cost of the coat. The hotel pointed to an exclusion clause on a notice behind a door in the bedroom leading to a washbasin, which said,

"The proprietors will not hold themselves responsible for articles lost or stolen, unless handed to the manageress for safe custody."

Mrs Olley argued that the clause was not incorporated into the contract.

== Judgment ==
Denning LJ, Singleton LJ and Bucknill LJ found, firstly, that the hotel had failed to take reasonable care as they were required to do contractually and under Innkeepers' Liability Act 1863, section 1.

Secondly, the disclaimer was not part of the contract and the hotel could not rely upon it. The contract for the storage of the coat was formed at the reception desk. There was no way that Mrs Olley could have been aware of the disclaimer at that point and so it could not be part of the contract.

The only other point in the case is whether the hotel company are protected by the notice which they put in the bedrooms, "The proprietors will not hold themselves responsible for articles lost or stolen, unless handed to the manageress for safe custody." The first question is whether that notice formed part of the contract. Now people who rely on a contract to exempt themselves from their common law liability must prove that contract strictly. Not only must the terms of the contract be clearly proved, but also the intention to create legal relations – the intention to be legally bound – must also be clearly proved. The best way of proving it is by a written document signed by the party to be bound. Another way is by handing him before or at the time of the contract a written notice specifying its terms and making it clear to him that the contract is on those terms. A prominent public notice which is plain for him to see when he makes the contract or an express oral stipulation would, no doubt, have the same effect. But nothing short of one of these three ways will suffice. It has been held that mere notices put on receipts for money do not make a contract. (See Chapelton v. Barry Urban District Council) So, also, in my opinion, notices put up in bedrooms do not of themselves make a contract. As a rule, the guest does not see them until after he has been accepted as a guest. The hotel company no doubt hope that the guest will be held bound by them, but the hope is vain unless they clearly show that he agreed to be bound by them, which is rarely the case. Assuming, however, that Mrs. Olley did agree to be bound by the terms of this notice, there remains the question whether on its true interpretation it exempted the hotel company from liability for their own negligence. It is said, and, indeed, with some support from the authorities, that this depends on whether the hotel was a common inn with the liability at common law of an insurer, or a private hotel with liability only for negligence. I confess that I do not think it should depend on that question. It should depend on the words of the contract. In order to exempt a person from liability for negligence, the exemption should be clear on the face of the contract. It should not depend on what view the courts may ultimately take on the question of whether the house is a common inn or a private hotel. In cases where it is clearly a common inn or, indeed, where it is uncertain whether it is a common inn or a private hotel, I am of opinion that a notice in these terms would not exempt the hotel company from liability for negligence but only from any liability as insurers. Indeed, even if it were clearly not a common inn but only a private hotel, I should be of the same opinion. Ample content can be given to the notice by construing it as a warning that the hotel company is not liable, in the absence of negligence. As such it serves a useful purpose. It is a warning to the guest that he must do his part to take care of his things himself, and, if need be, insure them. It is unnecessary to go further and to construe the notice as a contractual exemption of the hotel company from their common law liability for negligence. I agree that the appeal should be dismissed.

== See also ==
- Parker v South Eastern Railway Company
