= Parker v South Eastern Rly Co =

Parker v South Eastern Railway
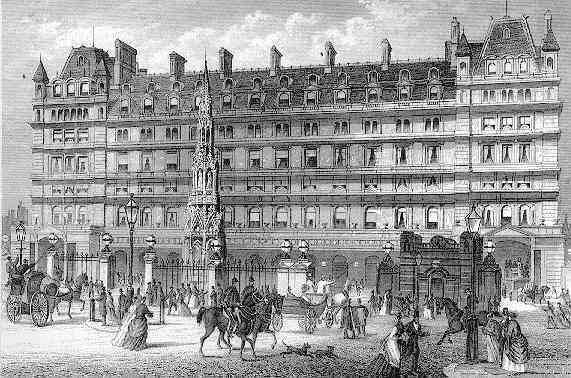
- Court: Court of Appeal
- Citation: [1877] 2 CPD 416

Case history
- Subsequent action: (1875-76) LR 1 CPD 618

Court membership
- Judges sitting: Mellish LJ, Baggallay LJ, Bramwell LJ

Parker v South Eastern Railway [1877] 2 CPD 416 is a famous English contract law case on exclusion clauses where the court held that an individual cannot escape a contractual term by failing to read the contract but that a party wanting to rely on an exclusion clause must take reasonable steps to bring it to the attention of the customer.

== Facts ==
Mr Parker left a bag in the cloakroom of Charing Cross railway station, run by the South Eastern Railway Company. On depositing his bag and paying two pence he received a ticket. On the front it said "see back". On its back, it stated that the railway was excluded from liability for items worth £10 or more. Mr Parker failed to read the clause as he thought the ticket was only a receipt of payment. However, he admitted that he knew the ticket contained writing. Mr Parker's bag, which was worth more than £10, was lost. He sued the company. The question of law put to the court was whether the clause applied to Mr Parker. At trial the jury found for Mr Parker as it was reasonable for him not to read the ticket.

== Judgment ==
=== Divisional Court ===
Lord Coleridge CJ, Brett J and Lindley J decided in favour of Mr Parker, upholding the jury award. Lindley J remarked,

On the finding of the jury, I think we cannot say that the defendants did not accept the article, to be taken care of by them, without any special terms. Henderson v Stevenson, therefore, is undistinguishable from this case, except for the words “see back,” which did not appear on the face of the ticket in that case. But the findings here make that distinction immaterial. After the conclusions of fact which the jury have drawn, it is, upon the authority of that case, quite immaterial whether the special terms relied on were on the front or on the back of the ticket.

=== Court of Appeal ===
The majority of the Court of Appeal held there should be a retrial. They said that if Mr Parker knew of the conditions he would be bound. If he did not know, he would still be bound if he was given the ticket in such a way as amounted to "reasonable notice". Mellish LJ said the following.

I am of opinion, therefore, that the proper direction to leave to the jury in these cases is, that if the person receiving the ticket did not see or know that there was any writing on the ticket, he is not bound by the conditions; that if he knew there was writing, and knew or believed that the writing contained conditions, then he is bound by the conditions; that if he knew there was writing on the ticket, but did not know or believe that the writing contained conditions, nevertheless he would be bound, if the delivering of the ticket to him in such a manner that he could see there was writing upon it, was, in the opinion of the jury, reasonable notice that the writing contained conditions.

Baggallay LJ concurred, and predicted that the same result would be reached by the jury (in Mr Parker's favour). Bramwell LJ dissented, holding that reasonable notice should be a question of law, and that held decided in favour of the railway company.

== See also ==
- Chapelton v Barry UDC [1940]
- Olley v Marlborough Court Hotel (1949) another famous exclusion case
- Thornton v Shoe Lane Parking Ltd
- George Mitchell v Finney Lock Seeds Ltd
