= Contractual terms in English law =

Contractual terms in English law is a topic which deals with four main issues.

- which terms are incorporated into the contract
- how are the terms of the contract to be interpreted
- whether terms are implied into the contract
- what controls are placed on unfair terms

The terms of a contract are the essence of a contract, and tell the reader what the contract will do. For instance, the price of a good, the time of its promised delivery and the description of the good will all be terms of the contract.

== What are terms ==
A contractual "[a]ny provision forming part of a contract" Each term gives rise to a contractual obligation, breach of which can give rise to litigation. Not all terms are stated expressly and some terms carry less legal gravity as they are peripheral to the objectives of the contract.

- Condition or Warranty. Conditions are terms which go to the very root of a contract. Breach of these terms repudiate the contract, allowing the other party to discharge the contract. A warranty is not so imperative so the contract will subsist after a breach. Breach of either will give rise to damages.

It is an objective matter of fact whether a term goes to the root of a contract. By way of illustration, an actress' obligation to perform the opening night of a theatrical production is a condition, whereas a singers obligation to perform during the first three days of rehearsal is a warranty.

Statute may also declare a term or nature of term to be a condition or warranty; for example the Sale of Goods Act 1979 s15A provides that terms as to title, description, quality and sample (as described in the Act) are conditions save in certain defined circumstances.

- Innominate term. Lord Diplock, in Hong Kong Fir Shipping Co Ltd v Kawasaki Kisen Kaisha Ltd, created the concept of an innominate term, breach of which may or not go to the root of the contract depending upon the nature of the breach. breach of these terms, as with all terms, will give rise to damages. Whether or not it repudiates the contract depends upon whether legal benefit of the contract has been removed from the innocent party. Megaw LJ, in 1970, preferred the use of the classic categorising into condition or warranty due to legal certainty. This was interpreted by the House of Lords as merely restricting its application in Reardon Smith Line Ltd v Hansen-Tangen.

=== Status as a term ===
Status as a term is important as a party can only take legal action for the non fulfillment of a term as opposed to representations or mere puffs. Legally speaking, only statements that amount to a term create contractual obligations. Statements can be split into the following types:

- Puff (sales talk): If no reasonable person hearing this statement would take it seriously, it is a puff, and no action in contract is available if the statement proves to be wrong. It may also be referred to as "puffery". This is common in television commercials.
- Representation: A representation is a statement of fact which does not amount to a term of the contract but it is one that the maker of the statement does not guarantee its truth. This gives rise to no contractual obligation but may amount to a tort, for example misrepresentation.
- Term: A term is similar to a representation, but the truth of the statement is guaranteed by the person who made the statement therefore giving rise to a contractual obligation. For the purposes of Breach of Contract a term may further be categories as a condition, warranty or innominate term.

There are various factors that a court may take into account in determining the nature of a statement. These include:

- Timing: If the contract was concluded soon after the statement was made, this is a strong indication that the statement induced the person to enter into the contract. Lapse of a week within the negotiations of a car sale was held to amount only to a representation in Routledge v McKay
- Content of statement: It is necessary to consider what was said in the given context, which has nothing to do with the importance of a statement.
- Knowledge and expertise: In Oscar Chess Ltd v Williams, a person selling a car to a second-hand car dealer stated that it was a 1948 Morris, when in fact it was a 1939 model car. It was held that the statement did not become a term because a reasonable person in the position of the car dealer would not have thought that an inexperienced person would have guaranteed the truth of the statement.
- Reduction into Writing: Where the contract is consolidated into writing, previous spoken terms, omitted from the consolidation, will probably be relegated to representations. The old case of Birch v Paramount Estates Ltd provided that a very important spoken term may persist even if omitted from the written consolidation; this case concerned the quality of a residential house.

The parol evidence rule limits what things can be taken into account when trying to interpret a contract. This rule has practically ceased operation under UK law, but remains functional in Australian Law.

== Implied terms ==
A term may either be expressed or implied. An express term is one stated by the parties during negotiation or written in a contractual document. Implied terms are not stated but nevertheless form a provision of the contract.

=== Terms implied in fact ===
The Privy Council established a five stage test in BP Refinery (Westernport) Pty Ltd v Shire of Hastings:

1. Reasonableness and equitableness: The implied term must be reasonable and equitable.
2. Business efficacy: The implied term must be necessary for the business efficacy of the contract. For instance, if the term simply causes the contract to operate better, that does not fit this criterion. This is the principle laid out in The Moorcock. The presiding judge created a quaint concept of an officious bystander; if the officious bystander were to propose a term and both the parties would be likely to reply "oh, of course", the term is implied.
3. Obviousness: The term is so obvious that it goes without saying. Furthermore, there must be one and only one thing that would be implied by the parties. For example, in Codelfa Construction Pty Ltd v State Rail Authority of New South Wales, a term regarding the inability of construction company to work three shifts a day could not be implied because it was unclear what form it would have taken. In English Law, This principle was established in the case of Spring v NASDS, in the context of a Trade Union membership contract.
4. Clear expression: The term must be capable of clear expression. No specific technical knowledge should be required.
5. Consistency: The implied term may not contradict an express term.

In Australia, the High Court has ruled that the test in BP Refinery applies only to formal contracts, while the test in Byrne and Frew v Australian Airlines Ltd shall apply to informal contracts:

- Necessity: The term must be necessary to ensure reasonable or effective operation of a contract of the nature before the court.
- Consistency: The implied term may not contradict an express term (same as for formal contracts).
- Clear expression: The term must be capable of clear expression (same as for formal contracts).
- Obvious: McHugh and Gummow JJ have stated that it must also be obvious.

=== Terms implied in law ===
These are terms that have been implied into standardised relationships.

Common law.

- Liverpool City Council v Irwin established a term to be implied into all contracts between tenant and landlord that the landlord is obliged to keep the common areas in a reasonable state of repair.
- Wong Mee Wan v Kwan Kin Travel Services Ltd established that when a tour operator contracts to for the sale of goods. The most important legislation under United Kingdom law is the Sale of Goods Act 1979, the Consumer Protection (Distance Selling) Regulations 2000 and the Supply of Goods and Services Act 1982 which imply terms into all contracts whereby goods are sold or services provided.

These terms will be implied into all contracts of the same nature as a matter of law.

Statutory.

The rules by which many contracts are governed are provided in specialized statutes that deal with particular subjects. Most countries, for example, have statutes which deal directly with sale of goods, lease transactions, and trade practices. For example, each American state except Louisiana has adopted Article 2 of the Uniform Commercial Code, which regulates contracts for the sale of goods. The most important legislation implying terms under United Kingdom law are the Sale of Goods Act 1979, the Consumer Protection (Distance Selling) Regulations 2000 and the Supply of Goods and Services Act 1982 which imply terms into all contracts whereby goods are sold or services provided.

=== Terms implied by custom or trade ===
One is generally bound by the custom of the industry that one is in. To imply a term due to custom or trade, one must prove the existence of the custom, which must be notorious, certain, legal and reasonable.

=== Course of dealing ===
If two parties have regularly conduct business on certain terms, the terms may be assumed to be same for each contract made, if not expressly agreed to the contrary. The parties must have dealt on numerous occasions and been aware of the term purported to be implied. In Hollier v Rambler Motors Ltd, four occasions over five years was held to be sufficient. In British Crane Hire Corp Ltd v Ipswich Plant Hire Ltd, written terms were held to have been implied into an oral contract in which there was no mention of written terms.

=== Good faith ===
It is common for lengthy negotiations to be written into a heads of agreement document that includes a clause to the effect that the rest of the agreement is to be negotiated. Although these cases may appear to fall into the category of agreement to agree, Australian courts will imply an obligation to negotiate in good faith provided that certain conditions are satisfied

- Negotiations were well-advanced and the large proportion of terms have been worked out; and
- There exists some mechanism to resolve disputes if the negotiations broke down.

The test of whether one has acted in good faith is a subjective one; the cases suggest honesty, and possibly also reasonably. There is no general obligation to act in good faith term under English contract law: an attempt was made by Lord Denning in a series of case during the 70s and 80s but they are no longer considered 'good law'. European legislation imposes this duty, but only in certain circumstances. For the circumstances when an obligation of good faith may in certain circumstances be implied see Yam Seng PTE Ltd v International Trade Corporation Ltd.

The Unfair Terms in Consumer Contracts Regulations 1999 reg 8 will render ineffective any 'unfair' contractual term if made between a seller or supplier and a consumer. Regulation 5 of the Statutory Instrument further elaborates upon the concept of 'unfair', which is rather novel to English law. 'Unfair' is a term that was not individually negotiated (i.e. standard form) that "causes a significant imbalance in the parties' rights and obligations arising under the contract to the detriment of the consumer". This is not possible if the term is not contrary to 'good faith'; such as in Director General of Fair Trading v First National Bank, wherein the lack of a seemingly unfair interest term would leave the bank open to a very poor deal whereby no interest could be charged.

== "Subject to" contracts ==
If a contract specifies "subject to contract", it may fall into one of three categories:

1. The parties are immediately bound to the bargain, but they intend to restate the deal in a formalised contract that will not have a different effect; or
2. The parties have completely agreed to the terms, but have made the execution of some terms in the contract conditional on the creation of a formalised contract; or
3. It is merely an agreement to agree, and the deal will not be concluded until the formalised contract has been drawn up.

Subsequent authorities have been willing to recognize a fourth category in addition to those stated in Masters v Cameron.

4. The parties intend to immediately bound by the terms agreed upon and expect to create a further contract as a replacement for the initial contract which will contain additional terms (if agreed upon).

If a contract specifies "subject to finance", it imposes obligations on the purchaser:

- The purchaser must seek finance; and
- When offers of finance arrive, the purchaser must make a decision as to whether the offers of finance are suitable.

This may also refer to contingent conditions, which come under two categories: condition precedent and condition subsequent. Conditions precedent are conditions that have to be complied with before performance of a contract. With conditions subsequent, parties have to perform until the condition is not met. Failure of a condition repudiates the contract this is not to necessarily discharge it. Repudiation will always gives rise to an action for damages.
