= Marks and Spencer plc v BNP Paribas Securities Services Trust Company (Jersey) Ltd =

2015 UK Supreme Court contract law case

M&S plc v BNP Paribas Ltd
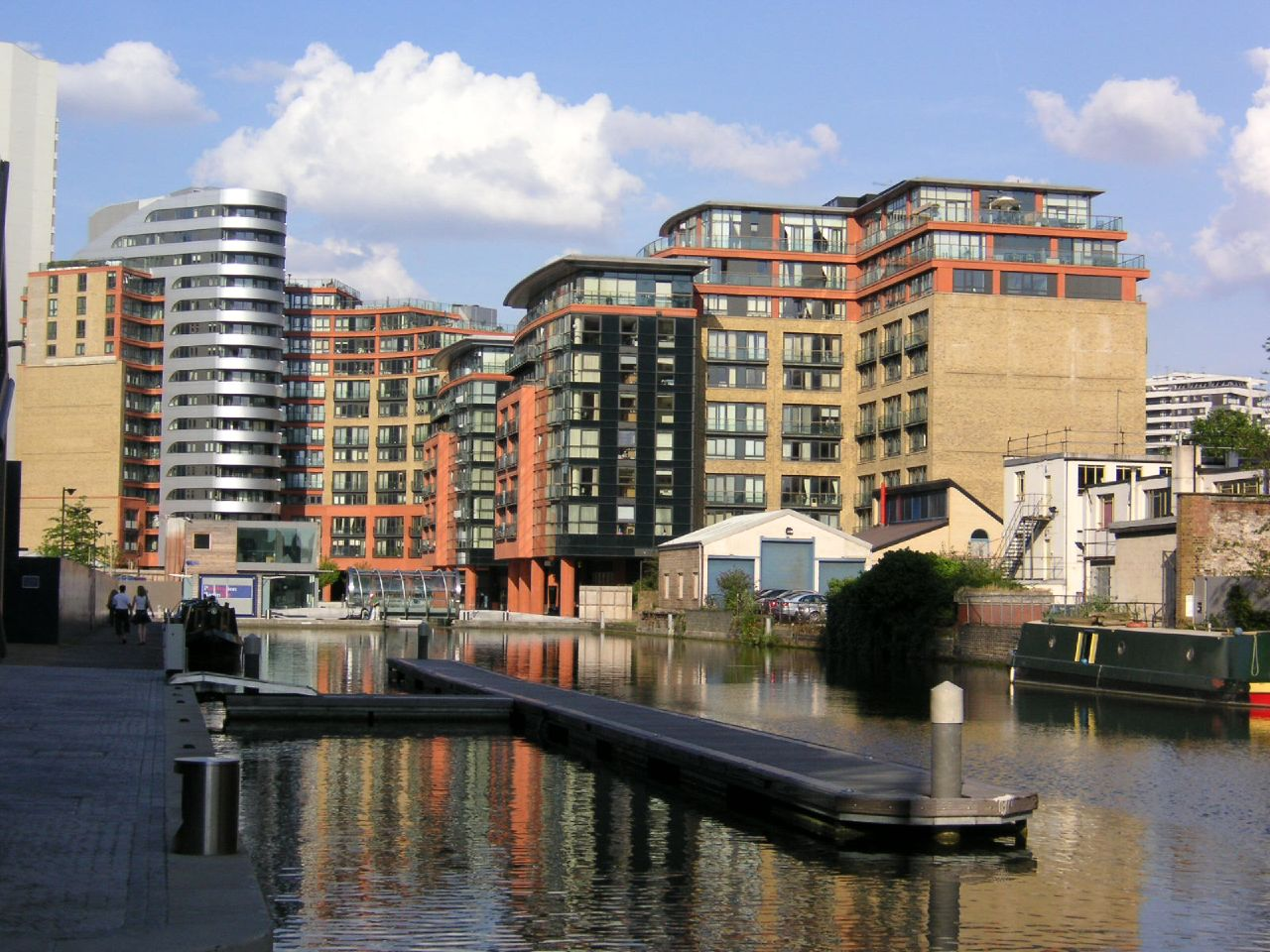
- Paddington Basin
- Court: Supreme Court
- Decided: 2 December 2015
- Citation: [2015] UKSC 72

Court membership
- Judges sitting: Lord Neuberger, Lord Clarke, Lord Sumption, Lord Carnwath, Lord Hodge

Keywords
- Implied terms

Marks and Spencer plc v BNP Paribas Securities Services Trust Company (Jersey) Ltd [2015] UKSC 72 is an English contract law case, concerning the implication of terms in commercial contracts, and business tenancies agreed between multinational corporations.

== Facts ==
Marks & Spencer, which was subleasing ‘The Point’ in Paddington Basin, W2 from BNP Paribas, claimed there should be an implied right to recover money that it had paid under its lease when it exercised the right to terminate. The basic rent was £1.23m a year, plus a premium of £919,800 plus VAT, service charge, and a car park licence fee. The rent had to be paid by the quarter. The landlord could recover by rent a ‘fair proportion’ of building insurance costs and building service charges. Clause 8 allowed M&S to end the lease on 24 January 2012 with 6 months advance notice if there were no arrears in rent, and this meant the rent needed to be paid up to the end of the quarter, which was longer than the time M&S occupied the property. M&S did so, and then claimed it should get back the rent from 25 January to 24 March 2012. The default law on apportionability would have suggested the rent could not be recovered, under the Apportionment Act 1870, but it was argued that it was an implication of the contract that it should be.

== Judgment ==
The Supreme Court held that the term in the lease to recover the extra portion of the rent should not be implied. The Court downplayed the significance of Lord Hoffmann’s judgment in Belize Telecom.

Lord Neuberger (with whom Lord Sumption and Lord Hodge concurred) said the following.

18. In the Privy Council case of BP Refinery (Westernport) Pty Ltd v Shire of Hastings (1977) 52 ALJR 20, [1977] UKPC 13, 26, Lord Simon (speaking for the majority, which included Viscount Dilhorne and Lord Keith) said that:

"[F]or a term to be implied, the following conditions (which may overlap) must be satisfied: (1) it must be reasonable and equitable; (2) it must be necessary to give business efficacy to the contract, so that no term will be implied if the contract is effective without it; (3) it must be so obvious that 'it goes without saying'; (4) it must be capable of clear expression; (5) it must not contradict any express term of the contract."

19. In Philips Electronique Grand Public SA v British Sky Broadcasting Ltd [1995] EMLR 472, 481, Sir Thomas Bingham MR set out Lord Simon's formulation, and described it as a summary which "distil[led] the essence of much learning on implied terms" but whose "simplicity could be almost misleading". Sir Thomas then explained that it was "difficult to infer with confidence what the parties must have intended when they have entered into a lengthy and carefully-drafted contract but have omitted to make provision for the matter in issue", because "it may well be doubtful whether the omission was the result of the parties' oversight or of their deliberate decision", or indeed the parties might suspect that "they are unlikely to agree on what is to happen in a certain ... eventuality" and "may well choose to leave the matter uncovered in their contract in the hope that the eventuality will not occur". Sir Thomas went on to say this at p 482:

"The question of whether a term should be implied, and if so what, almost inevitably arises after a crisis has been reached in the performance of the contract. So the court comes to the task of implication with the benefit of hindsight, and it is tempting for the court then to fashion a term which will reflect the merits of the situation as they then appear. Tempting, but wrong. [He then quoted the observations of Scrutton LJ in Reigate, and continued] [I]t is not enough to show that had the parties foreseen the eventuality which in fact occurred they would have wished to make provision for it, unless it can also be shown either that there was only one contractual solution or that one of several possible solutions would without doubt have been preferred ..."

20. Sir Thomas's approach in Philips was consistent with his reasoning, as Bingham LJ in the earlier case The APJ Priti [1987] 2 Lloyd's Rep 37, 42, where he rejected the argument that a warranty, to the effect that the port declared was prospectively safe, could be implied into a voyage charter-party. His reasons for rejecting the implication were "because the omission of an express warranty may well have been deliberate, because such an implied term is not necessary for the business efficacy of the charter and because such an implied term would at best lie uneasily beside the express terms of the charter".

21. In my judgment, the judicial observations so far considered represent a clear, consistent and principled approach. It could be dangerous to reformulate the principles, but I would add six comments on the summary given by Lord Simon in BP Refinery as extended by Sir Thomas Bingham in Philips and exemplified in The APJ Priti. First, in Equitable Life Assurance Society v Hyman [2002] 1 AC 408, 459, Lord Steyn rightly observed that the implication of a term was "not critically dependent on proof of an actual intention of the parties" when negotiating the contract. If one approaches the question by reference to what the parties would have agreed, one is not strictly concerned with the hypothetical answer of the actual parties, but with that of notional reasonable people in the position of the parties at the time at which they were contracting. Secondly, a term should not be implied into a detailed commercial contract merely because it appears fair or merely because one considers that the parties would have agreed it if it had been suggested to them. Those are necessary but not sufficient grounds for including a term. However, and thirdly, it is questionable whether Lord Simon's first requirement, reasonableness and equitableness, will usually, if ever, add anything: if a term satisfies the other requirements, it is hard to think that it would not be reasonable and equitable. Fourthly, as Lord Hoffmann I think suggested in Attorney General of Belize v Belize Telecom Ltd [2009] 1 WLR 1988, para 27, although Lord Simon's requirements are otherwise cumulative, I would accept that business necessity and obviousness, his second and third requirements, can be alternatives in the sense that only one of them needs to be satisfied, although I suspect that in practice it would be a rare case where only one of those two requirements would be satisfied. Fifthly, if one approaches the issue by reference to the officious bystander, it is "vital to formulate the question to be posed by [him] with the utmost care", to quote from Lewison, The Interpretation of Contracts 5th ed (2011), para 6.09. Sixthly, necessity for business efficacy involves a value judgment. It is rightly common ground on this appeal that the test is not one of "absolute necessity", not least because the necessity is judged by reference to business efficacy. It may well be that a more helpful way of putting Lord Simon's second requirement is, as suggested by Lord Sumption in argument, that a term can only be implied if, without the term, the contract would lack commercial or practical coherence.

22. Before leaving this issue of general principle, it is appropriate to refer a little further to Belize Telecom, where Lord Hoffmann suggested that the process of implying terms into a contract was part of the exercise of the construction, or interpretation, of the contract. In summary, he said at para 21 that "[t]here is only one question: is that what the instrument, read as a whole against the relevant background, would reasonably be understood to mean?". There are two points to be made about that observation.

23. First, the notion that a term will be implied if a reasonable reader of the contract, knowing all its provisions and the surrounding circumstances, would understand it to be implied is quite acceptable, provided that (i) the reasonable reader is treated as reading the contract at the time it was made and (ii) he would consider the term to be so obvious as to go without saying or to be necessary for business efficacy. (The difference between what the reasonable reader would understand and what the parties, acting reasonably, would agree, appears to me to be a notional distinction without a practical difference.) The first proviso emphasises that the question whether a term is implied is to be judged at the date the contract is made. The second proviso is important because otherwise Lord Hoffmann's formulation may be interpreted as suggesting that reasonableness is a sufficient ground for implying a term. (For the same reason, it would be wrong to treat Lord Steyn's statement in Equitable Life Assurance Society v Hyman [2002] 1 AC 408, 459 that a term will be implied if it is "essential to give effect to the reasonable expectations of the parties" as diluting the test of necessity. That is clear from what Lord Steyn said earlier on the same page, namely that "[t]he legal test for the implication of ... a term is ... strict necessity", which he described as a "stringent test".)

24. It is necessary to emphasise that there has been no dilution of the requirements which have to be satisfied before a term will be implied, because it is apparent that Belize Telecom has been interpreted by both academic lawyers and judges as having changed the law. Examples of academic articles include C Peters The implication of terms in fact [2009] CLJ 513, P Davies, Recent developments in the Law of Implied Terms [2010] LMCLQ 140, J McCaughran Implied terms: the journey of the man on the Clapham Omnibus [2011] CLJ 607, and JW Carter and W Courtney, Belize Telecom: a reply to Professor McLauchlan [2015] LMCLQ 245). And in Foo Jong Peng v Phua Kiah Mai [2012] 4 SLR 1267, paras 34-36, the Singapore Court of Appeal refused to follow the reasoning in Belize at least in so far as "it suggest[ed] that the traditional 'business efficacy' and 'officious bystander' tests are not central to the implication of terms" (reasoning which was followed in Sembcorp Marine Ltd v PPL Holdings Pte Ltd [2013] SGCA 43). The Singapore Court of Appeal were in my view right to hold that the law governing the circumstances in which a term will be implied into a contract remains unchanged following Belize Telecom.

25. The second point to be made about what was said in Belize Telecom concerns the suggestion that the process of implying a term is part of the exercise of interpretation. Although some support may arguably be found for such a view in Trollope at p 609, the first clear expression of that view to which we were referred was in Banque Bruxelles Lambert SA v Eagle Star Insurance Co Ltd [1997] AC 191, 212, where Lord Hoffmann suggested that the issue of whether to imply a term into a contract was "one of construction of the agreement as a whole in its commercial setting". Lord Steyn quoted this passage with approval in Equitable Life at p 459, and, as just mentioned, Lord Hoffmann took this proposition further in Belize Telecom, paras 17-27. Thus, at para 18, he said that "the implication of the term is not an addition to the instrument. It only spells out what the instrument means"; and at para 23, he referred to "The danger ... in detaching the phrase 'necessary to give business efficacy' from the basic process of construction". Whether or not one agrees with that approach as a matter of principle must depend on what precisely one understands by the word "construction".

26. I accept that both (i) construing the words which the parties have used in their contract and (ii) implying terms into the contract, involve determining the scope and meaning of the contract. However, Lord Hoffmann's analysis in Belize Telecom could obscure the fact that construing the words used and implying additional words are different processes governed by different rules.

27. Of course, it is fair to say that the factors to be taken into account on an issue of construction, namely the words used in the contract, the surrounding circumstances known to both parties at the time of the contract, commercial common sense, and the reasonable reader or reasonable parties, are also taken into account on an issue of implication. However, that does not mean that the exercise of implication should be properly classified as part of the exercise of interpretation, let alone that it should be carried out at the same time as interpretation. When one is implying a term or a phrase, one is not construing words, as the words to be implied are ex hypothesi not there to be construed; and to speak of construing the contract as a whole, including the implied terms, is not helpful, not least because it begs the question as to what construction actually means in this context.

28. In most, possibly all, disputes about whether a term should be implied into a contract, it is only after the process of construing the express words is complete that the issue of an implied term falls to be considered. Until one has decided what the parties have expressly agreed, it is difficult to see how one can set about deciding whether a term should be implied and if so what term. This appeal is just such a case. Further, given that it is a cardinal rule that no term can be implied into a contract if it contradicts an express term, it would seem logically to follow that, until the express terms of a contract have been construed, it is, at least normally, not sensibly possible to decide whether a further term should be implied. Having said that, I accept Lord Carnwath's point in para 71 to the extent that in some cases it could conceivably be appropriate to reconsider the interpretation of the express terms of a contract once one has decided whether to imply a term, but, even if that is right, it does not alter the fact that the express terms of a contract must be interpreted before one can consider any question of implication.

29. In any event, the process of implication involves a rather different exercise from that of construction. As Sir Thomas Bingham trenchantly explained in Philips at p 481:

"The courts' usual role in contractual interpretation is, by resolving ambiguities or reconciling apparent inconsistencies, to attribute the true meaning to the language in which the parties themselves have expressed their contract. The implication of contract terms involves a different and altogether more ambitious undertaking: the interpolation of terms to deal with matters for which, ex hypothesi, the parties themselves have made no provision. It is because the implication of terms is so potentially intrusive that the law imposes strict constraints on the exercise of this extraordinary power."

30. It is of some interest to see how implication was dealt with in the recent case in this court of Aberdeen City Council v Stewart Milne Group Ltd 2012 SLT 205. At para 20, Lord Hope described the implication of a term into the contract in that case as "the product of the way I would interpret this contract". And at para 33, Lord Clarke said that the point at issue should be resolved "by holding that such a term should be implied rather than by a process of interpretation". He added that "[t]he result is of course the same".

31. It is true that Belize Telecom was a unanimous decision of the Judicial Committee of the Privy Council and that the judgment was given by Lord Hoffmann, whose contributions in so many areas of law have been outstanding. However, it is apparent that Lord Hoffmann's observations in Belize Telecom, paras 17-27 are open to more than one interpretation on the two points identified in paras 23-24 and 25-30 above, and that some of those interpretations are wrong in law. In those circumstances, the right course for us to take is to say that those observations should henceforth be treated as a characteristically inspired discussion rather than authoritative guidance on the law of implied terms.

[...]

43. It has long been well established that rent, whether payable in arrear or advance, is not apportionable in time in common law. Accordingly, if a lease under which the rent is payable in arrear was forfeited or came to an end prematurely for some other reason, the landlord loses the right to recover the rent due on the rent day following that determination, at least according to the common law - see eg William Clun's Case (1613) 10 Co Rep 127a . Parliament sought to remedy this initially in a limited way through the now repealed section 15 of the Distress for Rent Act 1737 and the Apportionment Act 1834, and then more comprehensively through the Apportionment Act 1870, which is still in force. Section 2 of the 1870 Act prospectively provides that "All rents, annuities, dividends, and other periodical payments in the nature of income" should "like interest on money lent, be considered as accruing from day to day, and shall be apportionable in respect of time accordingly".

[...]

46. It follows from this conclusion that neither the common law nor statute apportions rent in advance on a time basis. And this was, correctly, generally understood to be the position when the Deed and the Lease were negotiated and executed. The claimant's argument, by contrast, is that a term should be implied into the Lease that the Basic Rent payable in advance on 25 December 2011 should effectively be apportioned on a time basis. The fact that the Lease was negotiated against the background of a clear, general (and correct) understanding that rent payable in advance was not apportionable in time, raises a real problem for the argument that a term can be implied into the Lease that it should be effectively apportionable if the Lease is prematurely determined in accordance with its terms.

[...]

49. If one concentrates on the factors identified in paras 33-35 above, there appears to be a strong case for the implied term for which Mr Fetherstonhaugh QC powerfully argued on behalf of the claimant. The point made in para 33 supports the contention that, not merely would an implied term be fair, but that clause 8 could be said to work rather unfairly without the implied term. The point made in para 35, supported by what is said in para 34, provides real support for the proposition that, without the implied term, clause 8 would operate in a rather capricious way. On the other hand, as Mr Dowding QC rightly said on behalf of the defendants, the factors identified in paras 38-40 above chime with the warnings given by Sir Thomas Bingham in Philips and his reasons for rejecting an implied warranty in APJ Priti. The Lease is a very full and carefully considered contract, which includes express obligations of the same nature as the proposed implied term, namely financial liabilities in connection with the tenant's right to break, and that term would lie somewhat uneasily with some of those provisions.

50. There is little point in resolving the hypothetical question whether, in the absence of the points discussed in paras 43-49 above, I would have concluded that a term should be implied as the claimant contends. Even if I would have reached that conclusion, I consider that it could not have stood once one faced up to the clear and consistent line of judicial decisions which formed the backcloth against which the terms of the Lease, and in particular the provisions of clause 8, were agreed. Save in a very clear case indeed, it would be wrong to attribute to a landlord and a tenant, particularly when they have entered into a full and professionally drafted lease, an intention that the tenant should receive an apportioned part of the rent payable and paid in advance, when the non-apportionability of such rent has been so long and clearly established. Given that it is so clear that the effect of the case-law is that rent payable and paid in advance can be retained by the landlord, save in very exceptional circumstances (eg where the contract could not work or would lead to an absurdity) express words would be needed before it would be right to imply a term to the contrary.

51. I accept that refusing to accede to the proposed implied term in this case can lead to the operation of clause 8 having the somewhat curious effect discussed in para 35 above. However, while the difference in result between the tenant paying the £919,800 plus VAT before or after 25 December 2011 can fairly be said to be capricious or anomalous, it does not begin to justify a suggestion that the contract is unworkable. Indeed, the result cannot be said to be commercially or otherwise absurd, particularly as it is entirely up to the tenant as to when that sum is paid. Further, the fact that rent payable in advance is not apportionable can always lead to potential unfairness. For instance, a landlord with a right to forfeit on 23 March for a continuing breach of covenant could wait for three days to re-enter, in order to be able to receive the whole of the rent due in respect of the quarter to 24 June....

Lord Carnwath concurred, saying that he did not see a substantive difference between Lord Neuberger's approach and Lord Hoffmann's approach in AG of Belize.

57. I agree that the appeal should be dismissed for the reasons given by Lord Neuberger so far as addressed to the issues between the parties. I add some brief comments only on the issue of implied terms, and in particular Lord Neuberger's comments on the status of the Privy Council judgment in the Belize case.

58. Unlike him, I would have been content to take my starting point not in the 19th century cases (such as The Moorcock), but in the most modern treatment at the highest level. That is undoubtedly to be found in the judgment of the Privy Council in the Belize case (Attorney General of Belize v Belize Telecom Ltd [2009] 1 WLR 1988). It is important to remember that this was not an expression of the views of Lord Hoffmann alone, as is implied in some commentaries, but was the considered and unanimous judgment of the Board as a whole (including Lady Hale, and Lord Rodger, Lord Carswell, Lord Brown, none of them known for lack of independent thought). In the leading textbook on the subject (Lewison, Interpretation of Contracts 5th ed (2014)), the judgment is realistically taken to "represent the current state of the law of England and Wales" (p 284, para 6.03).

[...]

71. In the same way the passages cited from Aberdeen City Council do not appear to support a sharp distinction between interpretation and implication, still less for the necessity of a sequential approach. No one thought it necessary to refer to Belize. Lord Clarke preferred implication, but acknowledged that the two processes achieved the same result. There is no indication that he had changed his view since Mediterranean Salvage. He seems to have treated them as two sides of the same coin. Lord Hope who gave the lead speech (which also had majority support) clearly saw them as part of a single exercise: the implied term was the "product" of interpretation. The case seems if anything to illustrate an "iterative", rather than sequential, process (see Lord Grabiner, The iterative process of contractual interpretation (2012) 128 LQR 41). The results of different interpretative techniques were considered and compared, in the light of the language used and its business context, to achieve a result which best represented the assumed intentions of the parties.

72. On the second point, in so far as there is a difference from the Singapore court, I prefer the approach of Lord Neuberger which seems to me entirely consistent with Belize. As he says (para 21), one is concerned not with "the hypothetical answer of the actual parties", but with that of "notional reasonable people in the position of the parties at the time at which they were contracting", or in other words of Lord Hoffmann's "reasonable addressee" (Belize, para 18).

Lord Clarke gave a concurring judgment.

76. As Lord Carnwath says at para 62, I did not doubt Lord Hoffmann's observation that "the implication of a term is an exercise in the construction of the contract as a whole". I recognise, however, in the light of Lord Neuberger's judgment, especially at paras 22 to 31, that Lord Hoffmann's view involves giving a wide meaning to "construction" because, as Lord Neuberger says at para 27, when one is implying a word or phrase, one is not construing words in the contract because the words to be implied are ex hypothesi and not there to be construed. However, like Lord Neuberger (at para 26) I accept that both (i) construing the words which the parties have used in their contract and (ii) implying terms into the contract, involve determining the scope and meaning of the contract. On that basis it can properly be said that both processes are part of construction of the contract in a broad sense. 77. I agree with Lord Neuberger and Lord Carnwath that the critical point is that in Belize the Judicial Committee was not watering down the traditional test of necessity. I adhere to the view I expressed at para 15 of my judgment in the Mediterranean Salvage & Towage case (which is quoted by Lord Carnwath at para 62) that in Belize, although Lord Hoffmann emphasised that the process of implication was part of the process of construction of the contract, he was not resiling from the often stated proposition that it must be necessary to imply the term and that it is not sufficient that it would be reasonable to do so. Another way of putting the test of necessity is to ask whether it is necessary to do so in order to make the contract work: see the detailed discussion by Lord Wilberforce in Liverpool City Council v Irwin [1977] AC 239, 253-254.

== See also ==
- English contract law
