= Implied terms in English law =

In English law, implied terms are default rules for contracts on points where the terms which contracting parties expressly choose are silent, or mandatory rules which operate to override terms that the parties may have themselves chosen. The purpose of implied terms is often to supplement a contractual agreement in the interest of making the deal effective for the purpose of business, to achieve fairness between the parties or to relieve hardship.

Terms may be implied into contract through statutes, custom or by the courts. When implied by statute, Parliament may well make certain terms compulsory. The examples are numerous. For instance, the National Minimum Wage Act 1998 provides that in a contract between a worker and their employer, the worker must be paid according to a minimum wage set by the government in annual regulations (£11.44 per hour for workers aged 23 or over as of April 2024).

Another example is that under the Unfair Contract Terms Act 1977, liability can only be excluded when reasonable in contracts among businesses. When terms are implied by courts, the general rule is that they can be excluded by express provision in any agreement. The courts have developed an apparent distinction between terms implied "in fact" and those implied "in law". Terms implied "in fact" are said to arise when they are "strictly necessary" to give effect to the "reasonable expectations of the parties". Terms implied "in law" are confined to particular categories of contract, particularly employment contracts or contracts between landlords and tenants, as necessary incidents of the relationship. For instance, in every employment contract, there is an implied term of mutual trust and confidence, supporting the notion that workplace relations depend on partnership.

There is also an ongoing debate whether the rules of remoteness and frustration or common mistake are best characterised as implied terms. Remoteness places a limit on the compensatory award given for breach of contract, so if unlikely losses result or losses are not something that one would generally expect compensation for, compensation is not payable. Recent (2008) judicial support for its status as an "internal" rule and as an implied term derives from the judgment of Lord Hoffmann in The Achilleas. Frustration is a rule which brings contracts to an end in the event of some unforeseen event subsequent to the agreement which would make performance of obligations radically different from that envisaged, for instance because a car for sale is destroyed before it is delivered. Common mistake, as a doctrine, following The Great Peace, analogous to frustration, can similarly be said to imply a term that a contract will be extinguished if entered into on the false pretence that performance would be possible.

== Implication by statute ==
Statute can imply terms into contracts. Consumer protection law (such as the Consumer Rights Act 2015) implies terms into contracts for the supply of goods to consumers that the supplied goods are fit for purpose, durable, and of satisfactory quality. Other examples include:

- The Sale of Goods Act 1979, section 12 states the following general rules:
  - In a contract of sale, the seller has the right to sell the goods
  - In an agreement to sell at a later date, the seller will have such a right at the time when the property is to pass
  - After the sale, the buyer will have and enjoy quiet possession of the goods
  - After the sale, the goods will be free from any charge or encumbrance in favour of any third party unless this has been made known to the buyer beforehand.
- Section 14(1) limits the implication of terms about quality or fitness to those terms actually contained within the Act.
- Sale of Goods Act 1979, ss 12–15 and s 55 "may (subject to the Unfair Contract Terms Act 1977) be negatived or varied by express agreement or by the course of dealing between the parties, or by such usage as binds both parties to the contract."
- Unfair Contract Terms Act 1977 s 6 makes s 12 non-excludable and ss 13–15 non-excludable in consumer sales.
- The Supply of Goods and Services Act 1982, sections 13 to 15 state the following general rules:
  - "Where the supplier is acting in the course of a business, there is an implied term that the supplier will carry out the service with reasonable care and skill" (section 13)
  - "Where ... the time for the service to be carried out is not fixed by the contract, left to be fixed in a manner agreed by the contract or determined by the course of dealing between the parties, there is an implied term that the supplier will carry out the service within a reasonable time" (section 14)
  - "Where ... the consideration for the service is not determined by the contract, left to be determined in a manner agreed by the contract or determined by the course of dealing between the parties, there is an implied term that the party contracting with the supplier will pay a reasonable charge" (section 15).

== Implication by custom ==
Terms can be implied into contracts according to the custom of the market in which the contracting parties are operating. The general rule, according to Ungoed Thomas J in Cunliffe-Owen v Teather & Greenwood, is that the custom must be:

certain, notorious, reasonable, recognised as legally binding and consistent with the express terms

One of the older cases illustrating this is the 1836 case Hutton v Warren. Mr Warren, a landlord, leased his farm to Mr Hutton. The tenant complained that it was the countryside's custom that landlords would keep the land arable and give a reasonable allowance for seeds and labour in return for leaving manure to be purchased. Parke B held there was such a custom and that

in commercial transactions, extrinsic evidence of custome and usage is admissible to annex incidents to written contracts matters with respect to which they are silent.

Like all terms implied by courts, customs can be excluded by express terms or if they are inconsistent with a contract's nature. Lord Devlin in Kum v Wah Tat Bank Ltd. summed up the policy of the law:

Universality, as a requirement of custom, raises not a question of law but a question of fact. There must be proof in the first place that the custom is generally accepted by those who habitually do business in the trade or market concerned. Moreover, the custom must be so generally known that an outsider who makes reasonable enquiries could not fail to be made aware of it. The size of the market or the extent of the trade affected is neither here nor there.

== Implied terms in employment contracts ==
The following terms may be implied into contracts of employment:

=== Employees' duties ===
- Duty to serve
- Duty to exercise reasonable skill
- Duty to obey reasonable and lawful orders
- Duty of confidentiality
- Duty of fidelity
- Duty to follow the employer's directions relating to health and safety (see Health and Safety at Work etc. Act 1974)

=== Employers' duties ===
- Duty to pay wages, including sick pay. The entitlement to statutory sick pay lasts for 28 weeks. For contractual sick pay, the general presumption is that an employer's obligation to pay lasts for "a reasonable amount of time"; if a contract of employment provides for pay during sickness absence, but does not specify how long it should be paid for, then a court or tribunal may decide for how long it shall be payable.
- Duty to provide work (but this may be explicitly disclaimed, as with zero-hours contracts)
- Duty to ensure safe working conditions

An employer is also under an implied duty not to terminate a sick employee's contract of employment on the grounds of sickness (this relates to the loss of, or loss of access to, private health insurance benefits). See the 2018 Employment Appeal Tribunal case of Awan v ICTS UK Ltd.

=== Mutual duty ===
- Duty of mutual trust and confidence
- The employer's duty to deal with employees' grievances promptly and properly may be seen as derived from the employer's duty of trust and confidence.

== Implied terms in software licencing ==
It may be necessary to imply terms into a software licence if the party who developed the software and the party who has purchased or uses it have not agreed all relevant terms. Nine propositions were set out by Lightman J in the case of Robin Ray v Classic FM (1998), which build on the law governing the implication of terms set out by the Privy Council in BP Refinery (Westernport) Pty Ltd v The President Councillors and Ratepayers of the Shire of Hastings (1977). These propositions allow that the software developer retains copyright unless there is an express or implied term to the contrary, which may be stated in the contract, and that commissioning the software does not in itself allow the customer to acquire copyright. In Clearsprings Management Limited v Businesslinx (2006) the court found it necessary to imply that the purchaser had "a non-exclusive personal licence under the copyright in the ... system with no right to sub-licence", and that the software developer, who had designed the system around the purchaser's operating procedures, was subject to a restriction on its use of information about the purchaser's operating procedures outside its role in developing the software.

== Implication in fact ==
- The Moorcock (1889) 14 PD 64 (terms may be implied only if they are "necessary and obvious ... to give business efficacy", not merely because they appear "desirable and reasonable")
- Shirlaw v Southern Foundries Ltd [1939] 2 KB 206, 207 (terms shall be implied only when necessary "to give effect to the reasonable expectations of the parties" as interpreted by a neutral, reasonable third party – the "officious bystander" test)
- BP Refinery (Westernport) Pty Ltd v Shire of Hastings [1977] UKPC 13, (1977) 52 ALJR 20, 26, a leading judgment of the Privy Council on the test for whether a term should implied 'in fact' into a contract, to give effect to the intentions of the contracting parties.
- Equitable Life Assurance Society v Hyman [2002] 1 AC 408 (a term was implied into an insurance contract that restrained the company's directors' freedom of action in order to uphold the parties' legitimate expectations in making the contract)
- Paragon Finance plc v Nash [2001] EWCA Civ 1466 (a contractual power to vary interest rates was ruled to be subject to an implied term to exercise that power in a rational and honest way)
- Attorney General of Belize v Belize Telecom Ltd [2009] UKPC 10 (the process of implying a term is objective and holistic, i.e. the contract means what a reasonable person thinks it means, even if that is not what the parties intended, and all available factors must be taken into account in its interpretation)

== Implication in law ==
- Liverpool City Council v Irwin [1976] UKHL 1
- Shell UK Ltd v Lostock Garage Ltd [1976] WLR 1187
- Scally v Southern Health and Social Services Board [1992] 1 AC 294,
- Johnstone v Bloomsbury Health Authority [1991] 2 All ER 293
- Mahmud and Malik v Bank of Credit and Commerce International SA [1998] AC 20
- Crossley v Faithful & Gould Holdings Ltd [2004] EWCA Civ 293
- Byrne v Australian Airlines [1995] HCA 24, (1995) 185 CLR 410

== Links with other doctrines ==
=== Remoteness ===
- The Achilleas or Transfield Shipping Inc v Mercator Shipping Inc [2008] UKHL 48

=== Frustration ===
Historically, the test for frustration was deemed to be one of implied terms. Judge Blackburn in Taylor v Caldwell deemed a contract for the hire of a music hall frustrated – where it had been destroyed – on the grounds that there was an implied term it would continue to exist.

Such an idea has been rejected in later cases, with the ideas of Krell v Henry and Davis Contractors v Fareham UDC being preferred. This is that a contract should be found frustrated where the principal purpose for contracting becomes radically different from the original purpose, as explained by Lord Reid:

The question is whether the contract which they did make is, on its true construction, wide enough to apply to the new situation: if it is not, then it is at an end.

=== Common mistake ===
- Great Peace Shipping Ltd v Tsavliris Salvage (International) Ltd [2003] QB 679
- Bell v Lever Bros [1932] AC 161
- Associated Japanese Bank (International) Ltd v Credit du Nord [1989] 1 WLR 255
- Brennan v Bolt Burdon [2004] 3 WLR 1321

== See also ==
- English contract law
- Contractual terms in English law
- expressum facit cessare tacitum or expressio unius est exclusio alterius
