= Contractual term =

Any provision forming part of a contract

A contractual term is "any provision forming part of a contract". Each term gives rise to a contractual obligation, the breach of which may give rise to litigation. An express term is a term stated by the parties during negotiation or written in a contractual document, but not all terms are stated expressly, and some terms carry less legal gravity as they are peripheral to the objectives of the contract.

The terms of a contract are the essence of a contract, and state what the contract will do. For instance, the price of a good, the time of its promised delivery and the description of the good will all be terms of the contract.

"Terms" and "conditions", although slightly different in their significance, are often treated together in phrases such as "standard terms and conditions", or "standard T&C".

== Classification of term ==
=== Condition or Warranty ===
Conditions are major provision terms that go to the very root of a contract breach of which means there has been substantial failure to perform a basic element in the agreement. Breach of a condition will entitle the innocent party to terminate the contract. A warranty is less imperative than a condition, so the contract will survive a breach. Breach of either a condition or a warranty will give rise to damages.

It is an objective matter of fact whether a term goes to the root of a contract. By way of illustration, an actress's obligation to perform the opening night of a theatrical production is a condition, whereas a singer's obligation to perform during the first three days of rehearsal is a warranty.

Statute may also declare a term or nature of term to be a condition or warranty. For example, the Sale of Goods Act 1979 (UK) s15A provides that terms as to title, description, quality, and sample (as described in the Act) are conditions save in certain defined circumstances.

=== Innominate term ===
Lord Diplock, in Hong Kong Fir Shipping Co Ltd v Kawasaki Kisen Kaisha Ltd, created the concept of an innominate term, breach of which may or may not go to the root of the contract depending upon the nature of the breach. Breach of these terms, as with all terms, will give rise to damages. Whether or not it repudiates the contract depends upon whether legal benefit of the contract has been removed from the innocent party. Megaw LJ, in 1970, preferred the use of the classic categorizing into condition or warranty due to legal certainty. This was interpreted by the House of Lords as merely restricting its application in Reardon Smith Line Ltd. v Hansen-Tangen.

== Enforceability ==
In general, parties can only sue for enforcement of valid contractual terms as opposed to representations or mere puffs.

=== Statements ===
Only certain statements create contractual obligations. Statements can be split into the following types:

- Puff (sales talk): If no reasonable person hearing this statement would take it seriously, it is a puff, and no action in contract is available if the statement proves to be wrong. It may also be referred to as "puffery". This is common in television commercials.
- Representation: A representation is a statement of fact which does not amount to a term of the contract but it is one that the maker of the statement does not guarantee the truth of. This gives rise to no contractual obligation but may amount to a tort, for example misrepresentation.
- Term: A term is similar to a representation, but the truth of the statement is guaranteed by the person who made the statement therefore giving rise to a contractual obligation. For the purposes of Breach of Contract, a term may further be categorized as a condition, warranty or innominate term.

=== Determination of nature of a statement ===
There are various factors that a court may take into account in determining the nature of a statement. These include:

- Timing: If the contract was concluded soon after the statement was made, this is a strong indication that the statement induced the person to enter into the contract. Lapse of a week within the negotiations of a car sale was held to amount only to a representation in Routledge v McKay
- Content of statement: It is necessary to consider what was said in the given context, which has nothing to do with the importance of a statement.
- Knowledge and expertise: In Oscar Chess Ltd v Williams, a person selling a car to a second-hand car dealer stated, as per a document received when he bought it, that it was a 1948 Morris, when it transpired it was a 1939 model car. It was held that the statement did not become a term because a reasonable person in the position of the car dealer would not have thought that an inexperienced person would have guaranteed the truth of the statement. In Dick Bentley Productions Ltd v Harold Smith (Motors) Ltd a dealer sold a car stating it had done 20,000 miles since an engine refit; the true figure was about 100,000. It was held this was a term. The dealer "was in a position to know, or at least to find out, the history of the car. He could get it by writing to the makers. He did not do so. Indeed it was done later. When the history of this car was examined, his statement turned out to be quite wrong. He ought to have known better. There was no reasonable foundation for it."
- Reduction into Writing: Where the contract is consolidated into writing, previous spoken terms, omitted from the consolidation, will probably be relegated to representations. The case of Birch v Paramount Estates Ltd. (1956) provided that a very important spoken term may persist even if omitted from the written consolidation; this case concerned the quality of workmanship in the construction of a house.

The parol evidence rule limits what things can be taken into account when trying to interpret a contract. This rule has practically ceased operation under UK law, but remains functional in Australian Law.

== Implied terms ==
A term may either be expressed or implied. An express term is stated by the parties during negotiation or written in a contractual document. Implied terms are not stated but nevertheless form a provision of the contract.

=== Terms implied in fact ===
The Privy Council established a five-stage test in BP Refinery (Westernport) Pty Ltd v Shire of Hastings. However, the English Court of Appeal sounded a note of caution with regard to the BP case in Philips Electronique Grand Public SA v British Sky Broadcasting Ltd in which the Master of the Rolls described the test as "almost misleading" in its simplicity.

1. Reasonableness and equitableness: The implied term must be reasonable and equitable. In Biotechnology Australia Pty Ltd v Pace, it was held a term that imposes a significant detriment or burden on the other party is unlikely to be equitable.
2. Business efficacy: The implied term must be necessary for the business efficacy of the contract. For instance, if the term simply causes the contract to operate better, that does not fit this criterion. This is the principle laid out in The Moorcock. The presiding judge created a quaint concept of an officious bystander; if the officious bystander were to propose a term and both the parties would be likely to reply with a testy "oh, of course", the term is implied.
3. Obviousness: The term is so obvious that it goes without saying. Furthermore, there must be one and only one thing that would be implied by the parties. For example, in Codelfa Construction Pty Ltd v State Rail Authority of NSW, a term regarding the inability of construction company to work three shifts a day could not be implied because it was unclear what form it would have taken. In English law, this principle was established in the case of Spring v NASDS, in the context of a trade union membership contract.
4. Clear expression: The term must be capable of clear expression. No specific technical knowledge should be required.
5. Consistency: The implied term may not contradict an express term.

The High Court of Australia has ruled that the test in BP applies only to formal contracts. In the case of an informal contract, where the parties have not attempted to stipulate the full terms, the courts should imply a term upon referring to the imputed intention of the parties, provided that the particular term is necessary for the effective operation of the contract. In implying terms in an informal contract, the High Court has suggested that a flexible approach is required. In a case where it is apparent that the parties have not attempted to spell out the full terms of their contract, the court should imply a term by reference to the imputed intentions of the parties if, but only if, it can be seen that the implication of the particular term is necessary for the reasonable or effective operation of a contract of that nature in the circumstances of the case. Obviousness also remains an important element in implying a term in an informal contract.

=== Terms implied in law ===
These are terms that have been implied into standardized relationships.

==== Common law ====
- Liverpool City Council v Irwin established a term to be implied into all contracts between tenant and landlord that the landlord is obliged to keep the common areas in a reasonable state of repair.
- Wong Mee Wan v Kwan Kin Travel Services Ltd established that when a tour operator contracts to provide services, a term is implied that those services will be performed with reasonable duty and care.

==== Statutory ====
The rules by which many contracts are governed are provided in specialized statutes that deal with particular subjects. Most countries, for example, have statutes which deal directly with sale of goods, lease transactions, and trade practices. For example, each American state except Louisiana has adopted Article 2 of the Uniform Commercial Code, which regulates contracts for the sale of goods. The most important legislation implying terms under United Kingdom law are the Sale of Goods Act 1979, the Consumer Protection (Distance Selling) Regulations 2000 and the Supply of Goods and Services Act 1982 which imply terms into all contracts whereby goods are sold or services provided.

=== Terms implied by custom or trade ===
One is generally bound by the custom of the industry that one is in. To imply a term due to custom or trade, one must prove the existence of the custom, which must be notorious, certain, legal and reasonable.

=== Terms made available on request ===
In England and Wales, an appeal court ruling in 2010 confirmed that the phrase "terms and conditions available on request" could create a binding obligation to comply with the terms. In Rooney v CSE Bournemouth Ltd., an aircraft-owner whose plane was covered by a maintenance work order issued using this terminology, argued that wording was not sufficient to incorporate the company's standard terms and conditions. The High Court initially agreed with this position but the Appeal Court overruled this, arguing that a "reasonable person" would have interpreted this phrase as intended to incorporate the terms.

=== Course of dealing ===
If two parties have regularly conducted business on certain terms, the terms may be assumed to be same for each contract made, if not expressly agreed to the contrary. The parties must have dealt on numerous occasions and been aware of the term purported to be implied. In Hollier v Rambler Motors Ltd four occasions over five years was held to be sufficient. In British Crane Hire Corp Ltd v Ipswich Plant Hire Ltd written terms were held to have been implied into an oral contract in which there was no mention of written terms.

=== Good faith ===
It is common for lengthy negotiations to be written into a heads of agreement document (sometimes unsigned, and sometimes labelled 'subject to contract') that includes a clause to the effect that the rest of the agreement is to be negotiated. Although these cases may appear to fall into the category of agreement to agree, Australian courts will imply an obligation to negotiate in good faith provided that certain conditions are satisfied:

- Negotiations were well-advanced and the large proportion of terms have been worked out; and
- There exists some mechanism to resolve disputes if the negotiations broke down.

The test of whether one has acted in good faith is a subjective one; the cases suggest honesty, and possibly also reasonableness. There is no such implied term under UK common law: an attempt was made by Lord Denning in a series of case during the 1970s and 1980s but they are no longer considered 'good law'. European legislation imposes this duty, but only in certain circumstances.

The Unfair Terms in Consumer Contracts Regulations 1999 reg 8 renders ineffective any 'unfair' contractual term if made between a seller or supplier and a consumer. Regulation 5 of the statutory instrument further elaborates upon the concept of 'unfair', which is rather novel to English law. 'Unfair' is a term in standard form (specifically that was not individually negotiated) that "causes a significant imbalance in the parties' rights and obligations arising under the contract to the detriment of the consumer". It must also be shown the term lacks 'good faith'; the claim failed in Director General of Fair Trading v First National Bank plc, as striking down a relatively high interest rate (falling short of extortionary rates) would mean borrower could have safely ignored the interest rates in its loan agreements (see UK requirements for consumer financial advice/advice waivers in major consumer loan agreements) and that high-rate lenders would receive no interest.

== "Subject to" contracts ==
If a contract specifies that it is "subject to contract", it may fall into one of three categories as identified in Masters v Cameron:

1. The parties are immediately bound to the bargain, but they intend to restate the deal in a more formalized contract that will not have a different effect; or
2. The parties have completely agreed to the terms, but have made the execution of some terms in the contract conditional on the creation of a formal contract; or
3. It is merely an agreement to agree lacking the requisite intention to create legal relations, and the deal will only be binding unless and until the formalized contract has been drawn up.

Subsequent authorities have been willing to recognize a fourth category in addition to those stated in Masters v Cameron.

4. The parties intend to immediately bound by the terms agreed upon and expect to create a further contract as a replacement for the initial contract which will contain additional terms (if agreed upon).

=== Contingent condition ===
If a contract specifies "subject to finance", it may impose certain obligations on the purchaser:

If the contract is silent on the level of effort required by the finance seeker (usually purchaser) to obtain finance, the finance seeker may come under an implied duty to cooperate. Furthermore, whether the finance seeker may validly claim non-fulfillment of a contingent condition, despite being genuinely satisfied with finance he or she obtained before the expiration of the contingent condition, was not decided in Meehan v Jones.

"Subject to finance" provisions may be also referred to as contingent conditions, which come under two categories: condition precedent and condition subsequent. Conditions precedent are conditions that have to be complied with before performance of a contract is required by both parties. With conditions subsequent, parties do not need to perform the contract if a condition is not yet (such as official certification to practice in a particular course of business). The non-fulfillment of a contingent condition means that the parties are not required to perform their side of the respective bargain.
