= Liverpool City Council v Irwin =

English contract law case

- Court: House of Lords
- Citations: [1976] UKHL 1, [1977] AC 239

Case history
- Prior action: [1976] QB 319

Court membership
- Judges sitting: Lord Wilberforce, Lord Cross of Chelsea, Lord Salmon, Lord Edmund-Davies, Lord Fraser of Tullybelton

Keywords
- Implied terms

Liverpool City Council v Irwin [1976] UKHL 1 is a leading English contract law case concerning the basis on which courts may imply terms into contracts; in particular in relation to all types of tenancies (including leases of land), a term may be implied if required for a particular relationship, such as for the landlord to keep the stairwells clear in a tower block. The tenants also had a duty of reasonable care which some among them had been repeatedly breached and led to a continuing breach in matters of damage about which they complained so they were not entitled to withhold rent on the facts.

== Facts ==
Three 15-storey tower blocks were built in Everton, Liverpool in 1966. Each had 70 units, a stairwell, two lifts, and a rubbish chute. Mr and Mrs Irwin were tenants from July 1966. The common parts were vandalised, the lifts did not work, the stair lights failed, the chute was blocked, lavatory cisterns blocked and overflowed. The blocks became nicknamed "The Piggeries". The tenants, conducting a rent strike, refused to pay rent. In an action by the Council to eject them, they counterclaimed that the Council was in breach of a duty to keep the common parts of the estates in decent repair.

== Judgment ==
=== Court of Appeal ===
Lord Denning MR dissented from Roskill LJ and Ormrod LJ and argued that a contractual term can be implied when it is 'reasonable'. After The Moorcock, Reigate and Shirlaw, he mentioned the 'stacks' of cases where terms are implied.

=== House of Lords ===
The House of Lords held that there was an implied term that the landlord should take care of the common parts of a building. This duty was implied on the basis that it was necessary to do so. But on the facts it was not breached because the council was not responsible for the damage done. The tenants also had a duty of reasonable care, and so they were not entitled to withhold rent on the facts.

Lord Wilberforce held it was a necessary term of living on an estate that landlords keep stairwells in order. However tenants also had a duty of reasonable care and on the facts the council was not in breach of its obligations. Applying the business efficacy or the officious bystander test would not result in the term’s implication, but asking what the relationship required would.

== See also ==
- English contract law
- Implied terms in English law

Implication in fact

- The Moorcock (1889) 14 PD 64
- Shirlaw v Southern Foundries Ltd [1939] 2 KB 206, 207
- Equitable Life Assurance Society v Hyman [2002] 1 AC 408
- Paragon Finance plc v Nash [2001] EWCA Civ 1466

Implication in law

- Shell UK Ltd v Lostock Garage Ltd [1976] WLR 1187
- Scally v Southern Health and Social Services Board [1992] 1 AC 294,
- Johnstone v Bloomsbury Health Authority [1991] 2 All ER 293
- Mahmud and Malik v Bank of Credit and Commerce International SA [1998] AC 20
- Crossley v Faithful & Gould Holdings Ltd [2004] EWCA Civ 293
