= Routledge v McKay =

1954 English contract law case

Routledge v McKay is a 1954 English contract law case, concerning the difference between a term and a representation.

== Facts ==
The claimant bought a 1936 Douglas motorcycle outfit in a part-exchange deal which required him to pay a balance of £30. The registration documents falsely stated that it was a 1942 model, as a previous owner had earlier modified the bike and had wrongly registered it as a 1960. The current seller had, during negotiations, mentioned the 1942 date, but the actual deal only took place several days later.

== Judgment ==
Even though the logbook clearly stated the bike's year as 1960, that statement was a mere representation and not a contractual term; nor was there any misrepresentation in this transaction. Furthermore, neither the owner who had made the false registration nor any of the intervening owners were liable to the current owner. The delay between the negotiations and the contract was a contributing factor to the decision.

== Analysis ==
A term is an integral part of an agreement, whereas a representation is a pre-contractual statement which remains non-contractual unless and until it is adopted as a term. During negotiations, in the process of offer and acceptance, a representation may take the form of (i) an invitation to treat, (ii) a request for information, or (iii) a statement of intention; but once a valid contract is formed these distinctions serve no further purpose.

== See also ==
- English contract law
- Oscar Chess Ltd v Williams EWCA Civ 5
- Dick Bentley Productions Ltd v Harold Smith (Motors) Ltd [1965] EWCA Civ 2
- Interpreting contracts in English law
