= ELCI =

ELCI may refer to:

- Equipment Leakage Circuit Interrupter, a type of residual-current device
- Employers' Liability Compulsory Insurance
