= Scally v Southern Health and Social Services Board =

Scally v Southern Health and Social Services Board and others
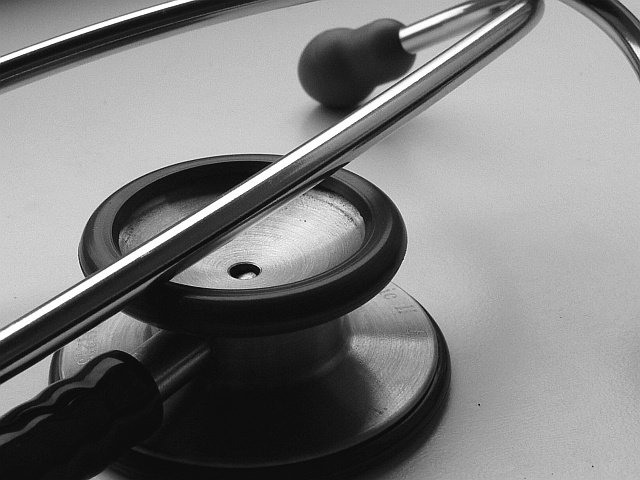
- Court: House of Lords
- Citation: [1992] 1 AC 294

Case opinions
- Lord Bridge

Keywords
- Pensions, implied terms

Scally v Southern Health and Social Services Board [1992] 1 AC 294 is an English contract law case, relevant for pensions and UK labour law, concerning implied terms.

== Facts ==
Dr Gabriel Scally and three other doctors were employees of either the Southern or Eastern Health and Social Services Boards in Northern Ireland. In consequence of the long duration of undergraduate medical training, six years, they would not have been in paid employment for the requisite 40 years before retirement to get full superannuation (or pension) benefits by the time they reached 60 years of age. But by law they could "top up" their superannuation by a lump sum purchase of added years of superannuation entitlement within twelve months of beginning their first period of employment in the Health and Social Services. Their employer did not inform them of this option within the twelve month time limit and therefore they were not in a position to take advantage of the enhancement.

Reynold QC, counsel for the employees, argued a ‘necessary’ term of employment was information about exercising rights under the superannuation scheme.

== Judgment ==
The House of Lords held that the employers had breached a contractual duty, implied into the employment contracts, to properly inform their employees about their rights.

Lord Bridge, distinguished terms implied ‘in fact’ to reflect the parties’ unexpressed common intentions and those implied ‘in law’. He went on as follows.

A clear distinction is drawn in the speeches of Viscount Simonds in Lister v Romford Ice and Cold Storage Co Ltd [1957] AC 555 and Lord Wilberforce in Liverpool City Council v Irwin [1977] AC 239 between the search for an implied term necessary to give business efficacy to a particular contract and the search, based on wider considerations, for a term which the law will imply as a necessary incident of a definable category of contractual relationship. If any implication is appropriate here, it is, I think, of this latter type. Carswell J. accepted the submission that any formulation of an implied term of this kind which would be effective to sustain the plaintiffs' claims in this case must necessarily be too wide in its ambit to be acceptable as of general application. I believe however that this difficulty is surmounted if the category of contractual relationship in which the implication will arise is defined with sufficient precision. I would define it as the relationship of employer and employee where the following circumstances obtain: (1) the terms of the contract of employment have not been negotiated with the individual employee but result from negotiation with a representative body or are otherwise incorporated by reference; (2) a particular term of the contract makes available to the employee a valuable right contingent upon action being taken by him to avail himself of its benefit; (3) the employee cannot, in all the circumstances, reasonably be expected to be aware of the term unless it is drawn to his attention. I fully appreciate that the criterion to justify an implication of this kind is necessity, not reasonableness. But I take the view that it is not merely reasonable, but necessary, in the circumstances postulated, to imply an obligation on the employer to take reasonable steps to bring the term of the contract in question to the employee’s attention, so that he may be in a position to enjoy its benefit. Accordingly I would hold that there was an implied term in each of the plaintiffs’ contracts of employment of which the boards were in each case in breach.

Lord Roskill, Lord Goff, Lord Jauncey and Lord Lowry concurred.

== See also ==
- Equitable Life Assurance Society v Hyman [2002] 1 AC 408
- Crossley v Faithful & Gould Holdings Ltd [2004] EWCA Civ 293
- Attorney General of Belize v Belize Telecom Ltd
