= Attorney General of Belize v Belize Telecom Ltd =

AG of Belize v Belize Telecom Ltd
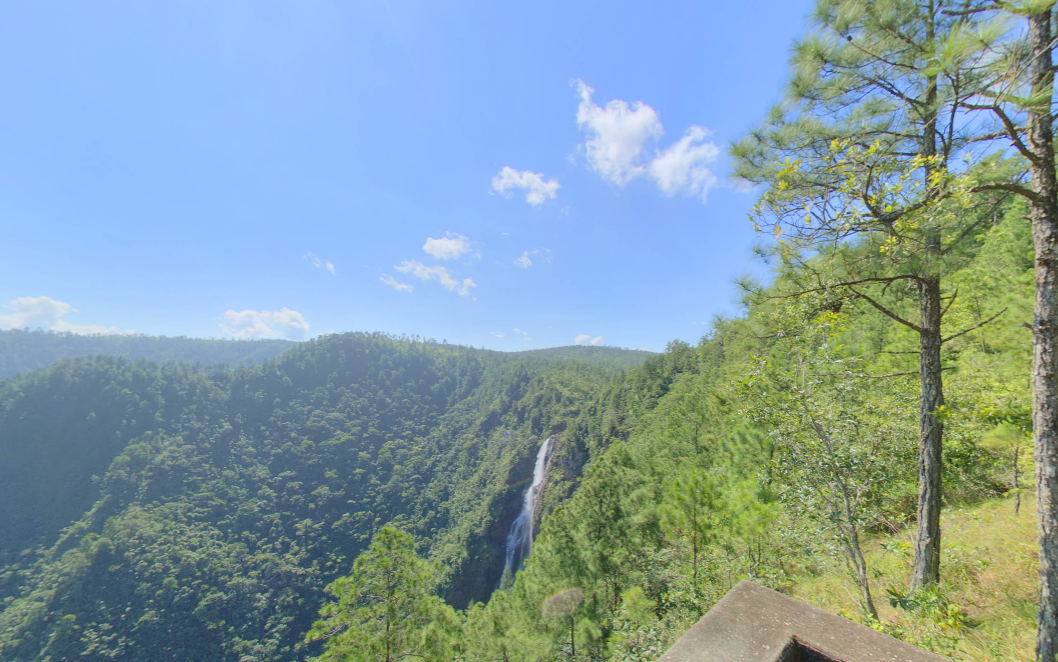
- Court: Privy Council
- Full case name: Attorney General of Belize, ECOM Limited and Belize Telecommunications Limited v Belize Telecom Ltd and Innovative Communication Company LLC
- Decided: 18 March 2009
- Citation: [2009] UKPC 10

Court membership
- Judges sitting: Lord Hoffmann, Lord Rodger of Earlsferry, Baroness Hale of Richmond, Lord Carswell, Lord Brown of Eaton-under-Heywood

Keywords
- Implied terms, construction, interpretation, company, articles of association

Attorney General of Belize v Belize Telecom Ltd [2009] UKPC 10 is a judicial decision of the Privy Council in relation to contract law, company law and constitutional law. It concerns the correct method for interpretation and implication of terms into a company's articles of association.

It was approved by the UK Supreme Court in Société Générale, London Branch v Geys and Marks and Spencer plc v BNP Paribas Securities Services Trust Company (Jersey) Ltd.

== Facts ==
In 1989 Belize privatised its telecommunications network. Established the year after independence in 1974, the Belize Telecommunications Authority's business and assets were transferred to a corporation called Belize Telecommunications Ltd (renamed Belize Telemedia in 2007). The government was to gradually sell off its shares, but in the process retain a "special share" (often called a golden share). According to the company's constitution, among various rights over important transactions, the special shareholder could appoint two of the eight directors. Class "B" shareholders (which were all private investors, such as British Telecom) could appoint two directors and class "C" shareholders could together appoint four directors. The government owned class "C" shares, and there was a further provision that if the special shareholder still had over 37.5% of the total share capital, it would be entitled to appoint two of those four "C" directors.

In 2003 the government decided to complete the privatisation process. Legislation was passed to try to let competition into the telecoms market. In 2004 Belize Telecom bought the special share from the government. It also bought the "C" shares the government still owned. But to finance this, it took out a loan from the government. In other words, the government converted its shares in Belize Telecommunications Ltd to debt. For security until the debt was repaid, the government obtained a pledge on the shares it had just sold (but not the special share). Immediately Belize Telecom appointed new directors, replacing the government appointees. But unfortunately on 9 February 2005, Belize Telecom defaulted on its loan repayments. The government enforced its pledge, and now once again had over 37.5% of the "C" shares, but without the special share. The question was whether the two directors that were subject to appointment by the person who held the special share and over 37.5% of the "C" shares could be removed. As it stood, nobody held both the special share and 37.5% of the "C" shares. The company's constitution did not have any provisions about this situation.

In 2008, after the United Democratic Party was elected on a platform of anti-corruption and honesty, this action was brought to change the board. Belize Telecom argued that those two directors were not removable. The Attorney General, for the government, argued this would be absurd and the articles should be construed as providing that a director should leave office if the specified shareholding which brought him there ceased to exist. Conteh CJ in the Belize Supreme Court agreed with the government and said that a term allowing the government with its 37.5% stake should be allowed to remove those two directors and appoint new ones. But Carey JA in the Court of Appeal held that there was no "necessity" in reading in such words. Morrison JA emphasised that art 90(D)(ii) provided for appointment and removal of directors, but nothing for tenure of office, and that therefore Conteh CJ's interpretation could not be "derived from the language of the articles". The Attorney General appealed.

== Advice ==
Giving the advice of the Privy Council, Lord Hoffmann set out the principles for interpretation of a company's articles such as this. He stated that the same principles of interpretation apply whether it is a company's constitution, a contract or an Act of Parliament. A court should search for the meaning of any such document with all relevant contextual facts in mind, and consider the meaning it would convey to a reasonable person. He emphasised it was not relevant, in cases where a gap was left, what the parties hypothetically "would have" concluded, a hypothetical inquiry which he referred to as "barren". The important point was to ask what interpretation, and implication would be consistent with the scheme of the company constitution (or contract or Act of Parliament). For this reason, Lord Hoffmann agreed with Conteh CJ that the directors could be removed. The scheme of the privatisation programme was to balance the interests of the government and private investors according to their economic interest. As such, it would have been absurd that just because the special share and the possession of 37.5% of ordinary shares had become disjointed that the incumbent directors would be irremovable. So given the gap in the articles, it was consistent with the scheme of the company's articles that the two directors in question would be appointable by the government. Lord Hoffmann's advice on the law read as follows.

16. Before discussing in greater detail the reasoning of the Court of Appeal, the Board will make some general observations about the process of implication. The court has no power to improve upon the instrument which it is called upon to construe, whether it be a contract, a statute or articles of association. It cannot introduce terms to make it fairer or more reasonable. It is concerned only to discover what the instrument means. However, that meaning is not necessarily or always what the authors or parties to the document would have intended. It is the meaning which the instrument would convey to a reasonable person having all the background knowledge which would reasonably be available to the audience to whom the instrument is addressed: see Investors Compensation Scheme Ltd v West Bromwich Building Society [1998] 1 WLR 896, 912-913. It is this objective meaning which is conventionally called the intention of the parties, or the intention of Parliament, or the intention of whatever person or body was or is deemed to have been the author of the instrument.

17. The question of implication arises when the instrument does not expressly provide for what is to happen when some event occurs. The most usual inference in such a case is that nothing is to happen. If the parties had intended something to happen, the instrument would have said so. Otherwise, the express provisions of the instrument are to continue to operate undisturbed. If the event has caused loss to one or other of the parties, the loss lies where it falls.

18. In some cases, however, the reasonable addressee would understand the instrument to mean something else. He would consider that the only meaning consistent with the other provisions of the instrument, read against the relevant background, is that something is to happen. The event in question is to affect the rights of the parties. The instrument may not have expressly said so, but this is what it must mean. In such a case, it is said that the court implies a term as to what will happen if the event in question occurs. But the implication of the term is not an addition to the instrument. It only spells out what the instrument means.

19. The proposition that the implication of a term is an exercise in the construction of the instrument as a whole is not only a matter of logic (since a court has no power to alter what the instrument means) but also well supported by authority. In Trollope & Colls Ltd v North West Metropolitan Regional Hospital Board [1973] 1 WLR 601, 609 Lord Pearson, with whom Lord Guest and Lord Diplock agreed, said:

"[T]he court does not make a contract for the parties. The court will not even improve the contract which the parties have made for themselves, however desirable the improvement might be. The court's function is to interpret and apply the contract which the parties have made for themselves. If the express terms are perfectly clear and free from ambiguity, there is no choice to be made between different possible meanings: the clear terms must be applied even if the court thinks some other terms would have been more suitable. An unexpressed term can be implied if and only if the court finds that the parties must have intended that term to form part of their contract: it is not enough for the court to find that such a term would have been adopted by the parties as reasonable men if it had been suggested to them: it must have been a term that went without saying, a term necessary to give business efficacy to the contract, a term which, though tacit, formed part of the contract which the parties made for themselves."

20. More recently, in Equitable Life Assurance Society v Hyman [2002] 1 AC 408, 459, Lord Steyn said:

"If a term is to be implied, it could only be a term implied from the language of [the instrument] read in its commercial setting."

21. It follows that in every case in which it is said that some provision ought to be implied in an instrument, the question for the court is whether such a provision would spell out in express words what the instrument, read against the relevant background, would reasonably be understood to mean. It will be noticed from Lord Pearson's speech that this question can be reformulated in various ways which a court may find helpful in providing an answer – the implied term must "go without saying", it must be "necessary to give business efficacy to the contract" and so on – but these are not in the Board's opinion to be treated as different or additional tests. There is only one question: is that what the instrument, read as a whole against the relevant background, would reasonably be understood to mean?

22. There are dangers in treating these alternative formulations of the question as if they had a life of their own. Take, for example, the question of whether the implied term is "necessary to give business efficacy" to the contract. That formulation serves to underline two important points. The first, conveyed by the use of the word "business", is that in considering what the instrument would have meant to a reasonable person who had knowledge of the relevant background, one assumes the notional reader will take into account the practical consequences of deciding that it means one thing or the other. In the case of an instrument such as a commercial contract, he will consider whether a different construction would frustrate the apparent business purpose of the parties. That was the basis upon which Equitable Life Assurance Society v Hyman [2002] 1 AC 408 was decided. The second, conveyed by the use of the word "necessary", is that it is not enough for a court to consider that the implied term expresses what it would have been reasonable for the parties to agree to. It must be satisfied that it is what the contract actually means.

23. The danger lies, however, in detaching the phrase "necessary to give business efficacy" from the basic process of construction of the instrument. It is frequently the case that a contract may work perfectly well in the sense that both parties can perform their express obligations, but the consequences would contradict what a reasonable person would understand the contract to mean. Lord Steyn made this point in the Equitable Life case (at p 459) when he said that in that case an implication was necessary "to give effect to the reasonable expectations of the parties."

24. The same point had been made many years earlier by Bowen LJ in his well known formulation in The Moorcock (1889) 14 PD 64, 68:

"In business transactions such as this, what the law desires to effect by the implication is to give such business efficacy to the transaction as must have been intended at all events by both parties who are business men"

25. Likewise, the requirement that the implied term must "go without saying" is no more than another way of saying that, although the instrument does not expressly say so, that is what a reasonable person would understand it to mean. Any attempt to make more of this requirement runs the risk of diverting attention from the objectivity which informs the whole process of construction into speculation about what the actual parties to the contract or authors (or supposed authors) of the instrument would have thought about the proposed implication. The imaginary conversation with an officious bystander in Shirlaw v Southern Foundries (1926) Ltd [1939] 2 KB 206, 227 is celebrated throughout the common law world. Like the phrase "necessary to give business efficacy", it vividly emphasises the need for the court to be satisfied that the proposed implication spells out what the contact would reasonably be understood to mean. But it carries the danger of barren argument over how the actual parties would have reacted to the proposed amendment. That, in the Board's opinion, is irrelevant. Likewise, it is not necessary that the need for the implied term should be obvious in the sense of being immediately apparent, even upon a superficial consideration of the terms of the contract and the relevant background. The need for an implied term not infrequently arises when the draftsman of a complicated instrument has omitted to make express provision for some event because he has not fully thought through the contingencies which might arise, even though it is obvious after a careful consideration of the express terms and the background that only one answer would be consistent with the rest of the instrument. In such circumstances, the fact that the actual parties might have said to the officious bystander "Could you please explain that again?" does not matter.

26. In BP Refinery (Westernport) Pty Ltd v Shire of Hastings (1977) 180 CLR 266, 282-283 Lord Simon of Glaisdale, giving the advice of the majority of the Board, said that it was "not... necessary to review exhaustively the authorities on the implication of a term in a contract" but that the following conditions ("which may overlap") must be satisfied:

"(1) it must be reasonable and equitable; (2) it must be necessary to give business efficacy to the contract, so that no term will be implied if the contract is effective without it; (3) it must be so obvious that 'it goes without saying' (4) it must be capable of clear expression; (5) it must not contradict any express term of the contract".

27. The Board considers that this list is best regarded, not as series of independent tests which must each be surmounted, but rather as a collection of different ways in which judges have tried to express the central idea that the proposed implied term must spell out what the contract actually means, or in which they have explained why they did not think that it did so. The Board has already discussed the significance of "necessary to give business efficacy" and "goes without saying". As for the other formulations, the fact that the proposed implied term would be inequitable or unreasonable, or contradict what the parties have expressly said, or is incapable of clear expression, are all good reasons for saying that a reasonable man would not have understood that to be what the instrument meant.

28. The Board therefore turns to consider the question raised by the articles of association. Two things are immediately apparent. The first is that the board has been constructed so that its membership will reflect the interests of the various participants in the company: the political interest of the Government, represented through its special share; the economic interest (if any) of the Government, represented by its holding of C shares; the economic interests of the ordinary B and C shareholders. The second is that the powers which the articles confer upon the Government (or its successor as special shareholder acting upon its written instructions: see article 11(A)) are carefully graduated according to its economic interest in the company at the relevant time. Thus, the power to block certain board resolutions in article 113 is exercisable "at any time at which the holder of the special share is the holder of C Ordinary shares amounting to 25% or more of the issued ordinary share capital". The power to block certain shareholder resolutions in article 8 is likewise exercisable "at any time" when the special shareholder has a 25% or more holding. And the power to appoint and remove special C directors is exercisable "at any time" when the special shareholder has a 37.5% or more holding.

29. In the case of board and shareholder resolutions, the relevant time for determining whether a blocking power exists is of course the time at which the resolution is proposed. In the case of appointments to the board, the draftsman appears to have assumed that it would be the time at which the appointment was made or the director was to be removed. In some cases, that would be sufficient to ensure that the board at any given time reflected the appropriate shareholder interests. For example, articles 90(B) and (C) give a majority of B shareholders the right to appoint and remove two directors. This is enough to ensure that the B directors will at any given time represent the interests of a majority of the B shareholders. If the majority lose confidence in their directors, or if there is a transfer of B shares which results in a different majority, it will always be open to the majority to remove the directors in office and appoint others. The same is true of the ordinary C directors appointed and removable by a majority of C shareholders under articles 90(D)(i) and 90(E).

30. The situation with which the articles do not expressly deal is where a change in shareholding results in the board no longer reflecting the appropriate shareholder interests, but without enabling this to be corrected by exercise of the power to remove directors. Assume, for example, that the special shareholder exercises its power under article 11(E) to require redemption of the special share. What then happens to the Government Appointed Directors appointed under article 88(A)? They cannot be removed from office because there is no longer a special shareholder who has power to do so. Does that mean that they remain in office indefinitely? The Board considers that, if one considers the role of the Government Appointed Directors and the policy of giving the Government the power to require redemption of the special share, namely, to enable it to relinquish its influence over the conduct of the company's business, the articles cannot reasonably mean that the Government Appointed Directors should remain in office after the special share has ceased to exist. They must be read as providing by implication that when the special share goes, the Government Appointed Directors go with it. In the opinion of the Board it is no answer to say that the special shareholder could have thought of the problem in advance and removed the Government Appointed Directors before redemption. No doubt he could, but the question is what the articles mean in the situation in which he has not done so. Nor is it relevant that the articles could be amended. They must be construed as they stand.

31. If, as the Board thinks, it would plainly be necessary to imply such a term in relation to the Government Appointed Directors, it must follow that upon the redemption of the special share, the special C directors will also cease to hold office. They are also there by virtue of the special share and when there is no longer a special share, there will again be no one who has power under the articles to remove them. That means that the whole basis upon which they are distinguished from ordinary C directors appointed by the majority of the C shareholders under article 90(D)(i) has ceased to exist. It is true that article 90(E) says that C directors shall hold office "subject only to article 112", but that cannot in the Board's opinion be construed as contradicting the proposed implied term, to which the draftsman plainly did not address his mind. In any case, the words "subject only" cannot be read literally because, for example, the provisions for retirement by rotation in article 94 are expressly applied to C directors (other than special C directors.)

32. If implication is necessary to prevent what would otherwise be absurd consequences following from redemption of the special share, the Board considers that there is no difficulty about applying the same principle to the case in which the special shareholder continues to exist but no longer has the 37.5% holding which would entitle him to appoint and remove special C directors. In such a case too, the implication is required to avoid defeating what appears to have been the overriding purpose of the machinery of appointment and removal of directors, namely to ensure that the board reflects the appropriate shareholder interests in accordance with the scheme laid out in the articles.

33. The Court of Appeal felt unable on the authorities to read the articles as having such a meaning. Morrison JA referred to Holmes v Keys [1959] Ch 199, 215, where Jenkins LJ said:

"I think that the articles of association of the company should be regarded as a business document and should be construed so as to give them reasonable business efficacy, where a construction tending to that result is admissible on the language of the articles, in preference to a result which would or might prove unworkable."

34. Both Carey JA and Morrison JA thought that the meaning which the Chief Justice had adopted was not "admissible on the language of the articles" ("requires remarkable mental gymnastics", said Carey JA). It should be noted, however, that Holmes v Keys was not a case about an implied term. It was a dispute over the meaning of a particular phrase in the articles, namely, whether, in an article which required a director to acquire qualifying shares "within two months after election", the date of "election" meant the date of the general meeting or the date on which the result of the election was declared. In a case such as that, in which it is argued that language should be given a certain meaning, it is usually essential (unless there has been an obvious mistake) that the language should, according to ordinary conventional usage, be capable of bearing that meaning. In the case of an implied term, however, the question is not what any particular language in the instrument means but whether, without it having been expressly stated, that is the meaning of the instrument.

35. The other case to which Morrison JA referred was Bratton Seymour Service Co Ltd v Oxborough [1992] BCLC 693. This was a case about the extent of the background which is admissible in construing articles of association. The company was set up to acquire and manage a property divided into flats which also included "amenity areas" (tennis courts, swimming pool, gardens). It was argued that there should be implied into the articles of association an obligation on the part of each flat owner/member to contribute to the expenses of maintaining the amenity areas. The implication was said to be derived from the circumstances in which the property was acquired and the terms of the conveyance to the company.

36. The decision of the Court of Appeal was that these background facts were not admissible to construe the meaning of the articles. Without them, there was not the slightest basis for implying such an obligation. Because the articles are required to be registered, addressed to anyone who wishes to inspect them, the admissible background for the purposes of construction must be limited to what any reader would reasonably be supposed to know. It cannot include extrinsic facts which were known only to some of the people involved in the formation of the company.

37. The Board does not consider that this principle has any application in the present case. The implication as to the composition of the board is not based upon extrinsic evidence of which only a limited number of people would have known but upon the scheme of the articles themselves and, to a very limited extent, such background as was apparent from the memorandum of association and everyone in Belize would have known, namely that telecommunications had been a state monopoly and that the company was part of a scheme of privatisation.

38. For these reasons the Board will humbly advise Her Majesty that the appeal should be allowed with costs before the Board and in the Court of Appeal and the declarations made by the Chief Justice restored.

== Significance ==
The case of AG of Belize v Belize Telecom Ltd has been widely cited as the new and all encompassing statement on implied terms. In Mediterranean Salvage & Towage Ltd v Seamar Trading & Commerce Inc, Lord Clarke MR said the following:

8 The correct approach to the question when to imply a term into a contract or other instrument, including therefore a charterparty, has recently been considered by Lord Hoffmann, giving the judgment of the Judicial Committee of the Privy Council, which also comprised Lord Rodger, Baroness Hale, Lord Carswell and Lord Brown, in Attorney General of Belize v Belize Telecom Ltd [2009] UKPC 10. I predict that his analysis will soon be as much referred to as his approach to the construction of contracts in Investors Compensation Scheme v West Bromwich Building Society [1997] CLC 1243 at 1257–8; [1998] 1 WLR 896 at 912–3. His analysis in the Belize case is extensive: see [16] to [27]. 9 It repays detailed study but for present purposes it is I think sufficient to say that the implication of a term is an exercise in the construction of the contract as a whole: see Trollope & Colls Ltd v North West Metropolitan Hospital Board [1973] 1 WLR 601, 609 per Lord Pearson, with whom Lord Guest and Lord Diplock agreed and Equitable Life Assurance Society v Hyman [2002] 1 AC 408, 459, where Lord Steyn said: ‘If a term is to be implied, it could only be a term implied from the language of [the instrument] read in its commercial setting.’ See Belize at [19] and [20].

== See also ==
- English contract law
- Imperial Hydropathic Hotel Co, Blackpool v Hampson (1883) 23 Ch D 1
- Chartbrook Ltd v Persimmon Homes Ltd [2009] UKHL 38
- The Achilleas
- Liverpool CC v Irwin
- Pepper v Hart
- Rayfield v Hands [1960] Ch 1

United States

- United States v. American Trucking Associations 310 US 534, 543 (1940) when the plain meaning of a statute is inconsistent with legislative history, then a literal reading need not be taken
- INS v. Cardoza-Fonseca 480 US 421, 432 (1987)
- AL Corbin, Corbin on Contracts (2nd edn 1964) and Restatement (Second) of Contracts (1979), where the idea of implied terms being part of the broader process of construction originates
