= Crossley v Faithful & Gould Holdings Ltd =

- Court: Court of Appeal
- Citation: [2004] EWCA Civ 293

Keywords
- Insurance, implied terms

Crossley v Faithful & Gould Holdings Ltd [2004] EWCA Civ 293 is an English contract law case, concerning implied terms in employment contracts.

== Facts ==
Crossley was a long-standing employee and director of Faithful & Gould Holdings Ltd. He fell sick and was unable to work. As a member of the firm’s disability insurance scheme he was entitled to benefits while he remained employed by the company. He was advised by his doctor to seek early retirement on health grounds as he was not expected to recover from his illness. After discussions with his employer he tendered his resignation in terms suggested by the company. The resignation resulted in the loss of entitlement to benefits and the scheme insurer stopped payments after one year. Crossley sought a ruling that an implied term of his contract of employment was that the employer would take reasonable care for his economic well-being and that by not drawing his attention to the loss of benefits had failed in this duty of care.

== Judgment ==
The court rejected Crossley's claim. Firstly it held that his resignation had been at his own instigation and secondly that, as a senior employee and director, it was reasonable to expect him to have reviewed the terms of the scheme or taken advice before resigning.

== See also ==
- Scally v Southern Health and Social Services Board [1992] 1 AC 294
- Equitable Life Assurance Society v Hyman [2002] 1 AC 408
- Attorney General of Belize v Belize Telecom Ltd
