= Heilbut, Symons & Co v Buckleton =

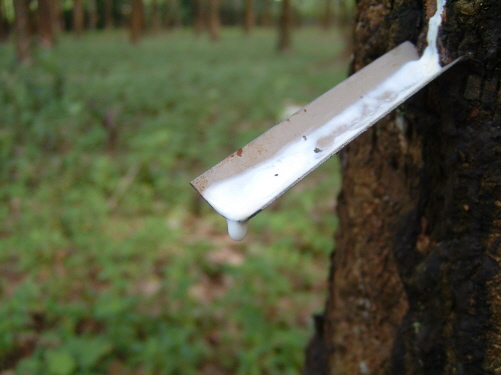
- Court: House of Lords
- Full case name: Heilbut, Symons & Co v Buckleton
- Decided: November 11, 1912
- Citation: [1913] AC 30, [1912] UKHL 2

Court membership
- Judges sitting: Viscount Haldane, Lord Atkinson, Lord Moulton

Keywords
- Shares, misrepresentation, contract terms, intention

Heilbut, Symons & Co v Buckleton [1912] UKHL 2 is an English contract law case, given by the House of Lords on misrepresentation and contractual terms. It held that a non-fraudulent misrepresentation gave no right to damages. This was decided decades before Hedley Byrne v Heller, where damages for negligent misrepresentation were introduced in English law, and, thus, it would today be regarded as wrongly decided under the tort of negligent misrepresentation.

== Facts ==
During an economic boom in the rubber trade 1910 (at the end of the Amazon rubber boom), Heilbut, Symons & Co were merchants who were underwriting shares of what they claimed was a rubber business, called the Filisola Rubber and Produce Estates, Limited in Mexico. Buckleton called up a manager at Heilbut to inquire about the shares. In response to the questions, the manager confirmed that they were "bringing out a rubber company". Based on this statement, Buckleton purchased a large number of shares. The company turned out to have far fewer rubber trees than expected. The shares performed very poorly. Buckleton sued for breach of warranty.

At trial the court found that Heilbut made misrepresentation but was not done fraudulently. Nevertheless, at trial it was found that there was a warranty in the statement regarding the rubber company. The claimant, Buckleton, did not succeed at trial.

== Judgment ==
The House of Lords held that no damages could be payable because it was not a fraudulent misrepresentation. Lord Moulton identified two ways that the action could be successful. First, if the plaintiff could show fraudulent misrepresentation "or what is equivalent thereto, must be made recklessly, not caring whether it be true or not." Second, if there was intent (animus contrahendi) to be held to a promise then there may be a collateral contract, that would bind Heilbut to their representation. However, Lord Moulton stated that such collateral contracts would be rare, and on the facts none was found. Lord Moulton said,

It is, my Lords, of the greatest importance, in my opinion, that this House should maintain in its full integrity the principle that a person is not liable in damages for an innocent misrepresentation, no matter in what way or under what form the attack is made. In the present case the statement was made in answer to an inquiry for information. There is nothing which can by any possibility be taken as evidence of an intention on the part of either or both of the parties that there should be a contractual liability in respect of the accuracy of the statement. It is a representation as to a specific thing and nothing more.

== Significance ==
Although Heilbut, Symons & Co would today be counted as having made at least a negligent misrepresentation, the case still has relevance for the general principle that representations become part of the contract if (as a very general principle) this is "intended". In Oscar Chess Ltd v Williams the Court of Appeal further clarified that the balance of information between a buyer and seller is relevant to determine what was actually intended, giving preference for the intentions of non-commercial parties who rely on others.

== See also ==
- UK company law
- English contract law
- Misrepresentation in English law
