= Employers' Liability (Compulsory Insurance) Act 1969 =

Act of the Parliament of the United Kingdom

Employers' Liability (Compulsory Insurance) Act 1969 (Note: Section 7(1).)
- Act of Parliament
- Parliament of the United Kingdom
- Long title: An Act to require employers to insure against their liability for personal injury to their employees; and for purposes connected with the matter aforesaid.
- Citation: 1969 c. 57
- Territorial extent: England and Wales; Scotland; (Note: Section 7(2).)

Dates
- Royal assent: 22 October 1969
- Commencement: 1 January 1972 (Note: Section 7(3). The Employers' Liability (Compulsory Insurance) Act 1969 (Commencement) Order 1971.)

Other legislation
- Amended by: Local Government Act 1972; Criminal Procedure (Scotland) Act 1975; Criminal Justice Act 1982; Local Government Act 1985; Norfolk and Suffolk Broads Act 1988; Education Reform Act 1988; National Health Service and Community Care Act 1990; Local Government (Wales) Act 1994; Local Government etc. (Scotland) Act 1994; Environment Act 1995; Criminal Procedure (Consequential Provisions) (Scotland) Act 1995; Health Act 1999 (Supplementary, Consequential etc. Provisions) Order 2000; Financial Services and Markets Act 2000 (Consequential Amendments and Repeals) Order 2001; National Health Service Reform and Health Care Professions Act 2002; Civil Partnership Act 2004; Equality Act 2006; National Health Service (Consequential Provisions) Act 2006; Police Reform and Social Responsibility Act 2011; Health and Social Care Act 2012; Financial Services Act 2012; Police and Fire Reform (Scotland) Act 2012 (Consequential Provisions and Modifications) Order 2013; Deregulation Act 2015; Policing and Crime Act 2017; Health and Care Act 2022; Levelling-up and Regeneration Act 2023

Status: Amended

Text of statute as originally enacted

Revised text of statute as amended

Text of the Employers' Liability (Compulsory Insurance) Act 1969 as in force today (including any amendments) within the United Kingdom, from legislation.gov.uk.

The Employers' Liability (Compulsory Insurance) Act 1969 (c. 57) is an act of the Parliament of the United Kingdom which requires that employers carry insurance against the personal injury of their employees.

== Content ==
The insurance that employers must take out is referred to as Employer's Liability Compulsory Insurance (sometimes referred to as "ELCI"). As well as being insured, employers must post details of the insurance for staff to see. This requirement applies to most companies; exemptions include public organisations and certain micro companies.

Under section 5, offenders can be sentenced, on summary conviction in a magistrates' court, to a fine of up to level 4 on the standard scale (£2,500).

== Employers' Liability Tracing Office ==
The Employers' Liability Tracing Office (ELTO) is an independent UK agency set up to provide insurance claimants and their representatives with online access to a database of Employers' Liability Insurance policies, so that people suffering from a disease/injury caused at work with a former employer can identify who provides their insurance. It is organised as an independent, not-for-profit company limited by guarantee and funded by a levy. It was established in 2011 and is based in Milton Keynes. ELTO replaced a previous voluntary Employers' Liability Code of Practice (ELCOP) tracing service, which had been in place since 1999.

In February 2011, the Financial Services Authority published regulations concerning the way that insurers and intermediaries record employers' liability policy data.

== Working abroad ==
The act does not require compulsory insurance against illness and injury suffered by employees working abroad. Reid v Rush and Tompkins Group Plc (1989) established that there is no requirement to advise employees to obtain insurance for themselves:

In a number of contexts, Parliament has legislated to protect people in this country from the risks of uncompensated injury. Compulsory employer's liability insurance has been imposed. Save for certain limited exceptions that duty does not apply to employment out of this country. Even in the limited and modest terms of a duty to warn it might be difficult to impose by judicial decision a duty on employers in respect of their servants working abroad, which relates to loss through injuries suffered where the employer is not responsible, having regard to the fact that Parliament has not imposed an obligation to ensure even in respect of injuries for which the employer would be liable. (Note: But contrast Scally v Southern Health and Social Services Board [1992] 1 AC 294)

== See also ==
- UK labour law
- English tort law
