= Shell UK Ltd v Lostock Garages Ltd =

- Decided: 30 June 1976
- Citation: [1976] 1 WLR 1187

Shell UK Ltd v Lostock Garages Ltd [1976] 1 WLR 1187 is an English contract law and UK competition law case concerning implied terms and restraint of trade.

== Facts ==
Lostock and Shell had a written contract that Shell would supply petrol and oil to Lostock, in return for Lostock buying its goods from Shell exclusively. In a price war, Shell reduced its petrol prices for some nearby petrol stations. Customers went there, and Lostock had no choice but to trade at a loss. Lostock sought another supplier and Shell sued Lostock for breach of contract.

== Judgment ==
The Court of Appeal, by a majority, held that no term could be implied that Shell should not "abnormally discriminate" against Lostock. It was held that Shell would not have agreed to the term and that the implied term would be too vague.
