= Corbin on Contracts =

Textbook on US contract law by Arthur Linton Corbin

Corbin on Contracts was a leading American textbook on US contract law written by Arthur Linton Corbin. It was influential in the development of contract theory and practice in the 50 American states, and throughout the common law world. Many of the views were cardinal to the development of the Uniform Commercial Code and the Restatement (Second) of Contracts.
