= Equitable Life Assurance Society v Hyman =

English contract law case

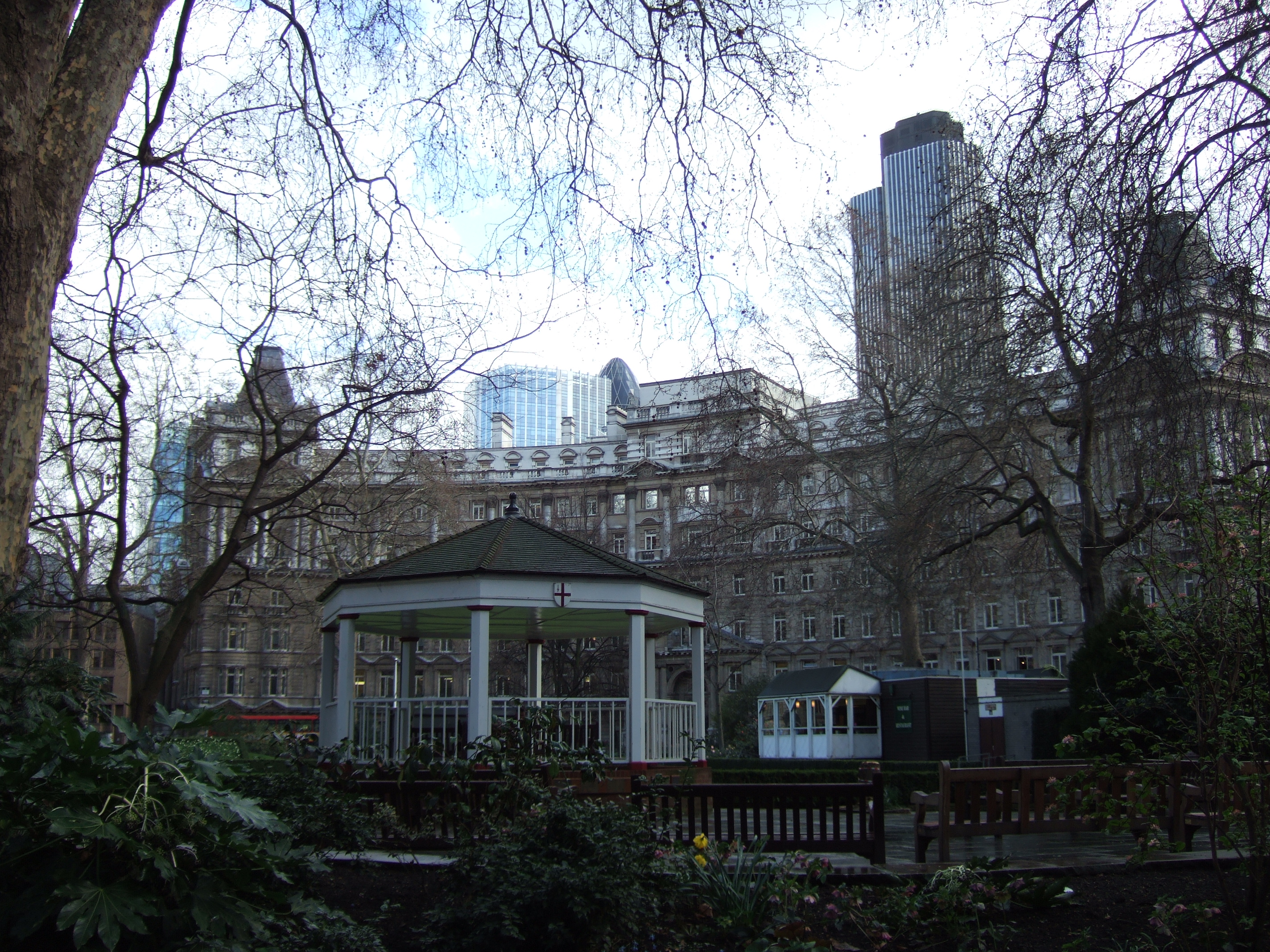
- Equitable Life's early offices were in Coleman Street
- Court: House of Lords
- Citations: [2000] UKHL 39, [2002] 1 AC 408

Keywords
- Life insurance, implied terms

Equitable Life Assurance Society v Hyman [2000] UKHL 39 is an English contract law case, concerning implied terms.

== Facts ==
Equitable Life (est 1762) issued 'with profits' life assurance policies, which are a way of saving for retirement. If policy holders took benefits as a taxable annuity (i.e. with a payment annually), then they got tax exemptions on the premiums (and bonuses at the end of the year). They could choose to have their annuity at a "guaranteed annual rate" ("GAR") that would be fixed, or a "current annuity rate" ("CAR") that would fluctuate according to the market. The choice did not affect the premium. From 1993 the current annuity fell below the guaranteed one. Article 65 of the Equitable Life's Articles of Association said the directors could, at their discretion, vary bonuses and the company had relied on this since its foundation.

The directors of Equitable Life decided they would reduce the level of terminal bonuses for GAR policyholders, from the higher figure shown on the GAR policyholders' annual bonus notices, to a lower figure (if necessary to zero) so as to equalise the benefits so far as possible i.e. the policy proceeds with the higher terminal bonus times the CAR rate equalled the policy proceeds with lower terminal bonus times the GAR rate (the Differential Terminal Bonus Policy - DTBP). The Equitable's Annual Regulatory Returns, submitted each year to the regulatory authorities (the Department of Trade and Industry - DTI) had set out this practice since the 1993 (when the current annuity rate first fell below the guaranteed annuity rate). The Equitable's Annual Regulatory Returns had been scrutinized each year by the regulatory authorities and nothing adverse had been said by the regulatory authorities about the Equitable's Differential Terminal Bonus Policy (which had been introduced in 1993).

In 1998, because the GAR policyholders received a lower terminal bonus than they expected (they expected the higher terminal bonus and, in addition, the GAR rate) certain GAR policyholders complained. Mr Hyman was a representative policyholder. At no point, however, were the GAR policyholders ever paid less per annum (and nor was there ever any intention by the directors of Equitable Life to pay them less) than their guaranteed fund (i.e. excluding the non-contractual terminal bonus) times guaranteed annuity rate.

== Judgment ==
The House of Lords unanimously agreed that there was an implied term in the Articles of Association such that the directors of Equitable Life could not exercise their discretion in the way they had because it defeated the reasonable expectations of the GAR policyholders as exemplified by Equitable having quoted the higher terminal bonus on each GAR policyholders' annual bonus notice (no other life office had quoted terminal bonus in its annual bonus notices to policyholders as terminal bonus can only be determined at policy maturity because of the volatility of financial markets). Although there was no express term in Equitable Life's constitution that constrained the discretion of the directors, it was necessary to imply such a term to uphold the policyholders' reasonable expectations. Lord Steyn gave the leading judgment.

It is necessary to distinguish between the processes of interpretation and implication. The purpose of interpretation is to assign to the language of the text the most appropriate meaning which the words can legitimately bear. The language of article 65(1) contains no relevant express restriction on the powers of the directors. It is impossible to assign to the language of article 65(1) by construction a restriction precluding the directors from overriding GARs. To this extent I would uphold the submissions made on behalf of the Society. The critical question is whether a relevant restriction may be implied into article 65(1). It is certainly not a case in which a term can be implied by law in the sense of incidents impliedly annexed to particular forms of contracts. Such standardised implied terms operate as general default rules: see Scally v Southern Health and Social Services Board [1992] 1 AC 294. If a term is to be implied, it could only be a term implied from the language of article 65 read in its particular commercial setting. Such implied terms operate as ad hoc gap fillers. In Luxor (Eastbourne) Ltd v Cooper [1941] AC 108, 137 Lord Wright explained this distinction as follows:

"The expression 'implied term' is used in different senses. Sometimes it denotes some term which does not depend on the actual intention of the parties but on a rule of law, such as the terms, warranties or conditions which, if not expressly excluded, the law imports, as for instance under the Sale of Goods Act and the Marine Insurance Act. . . . But a case like the present is different because what it is sought to imply is based on an intention imputed to the parties from their actual circumstances."

It is only an individualised term of the second kind which can arguably arise in the present case. Such a term may be imputed to parties: it is not critically dependent on proof of an actual intention of the parties. The process "is one of construction of the agreement as a whole in its commercial setting": Banque Bruxelles Lambert SA v Eagle Star Insurance Co Ltd [1997] AC 191, 212E, per Lord Hoffmann. This principle is sparingly and cautiously used and may never be employed to imply a term in conflict with the express terms of the text. The legal test for the implication of such a term is a standard of strict necessity. This is how I must approach the question whether a term is to be implied into article 65(1) which precludes the directors from adopting a principle which has the effect of overriding or undermining the GARs.

The enquiry is entirely constructional in nature: proceeding from the express terms of article 65, viewed against its objective setting, the question is whether the implication is strictly necessary. My Lords, as counsel for the GAR policyholders observed, final bonuses are not bounty. They are a significant part of the consideration for the premiums paid. And the directors' discretions as to the amount and distribution of bonuses are conferred for the benefit of policyholders. In this context the self-evident commercial object of the inclusion of guaranteed rates in the policy is to protect the policyholder against a fall in market annuity rates by ensuring that if the fall occurs he will be better off than he would have been with market rates. The choice is given to the GAR policyholder and not to the Society. It cannot be seriously doubted that the provision for guaranteed annuity rates was a good selling point in the marketing by the Society of the GAR policies. It is also obvious that it would have been a significant attraction for purchasers of GAR policies. The Society points out that no special charge was made for the inclusion in the policy of GAR provisions. So be it. This factor does not alter the reasonable expectations of the parties. The supposition of the parties must be presumed to have been that the directors would not exercise their discretion in conflict with contractual rights. These are the circumstances in which the directors of the Society resolved upon a differential policy which was designed to deprive the relevant guarantees of any substantial value. In my judgment an implication precluding the use of the directors' discretion in this way is strictly necessary. The implication is essential to give effect to the reasonable expectations of the parties. The stringent test applicable to the implication of terms is satisfied.

In substantial agreement with Lord Woolf MR I would hold that the directors were not entitled to adopt a principle of making the final bonuses of GAR policyholders dependent on how they exercised their rights under the policy. In adopting the principle of a differential policy in respect of GAR policyholders the directors acted in breach of article 65(1).

Lord Cooke added that the discretion could be struck down, no matter how broadly it was drafted, in the same way as happens in administrative law (Padfield v Minister of Agriculture) and private law (Howard Smith Ltd v Ampol Ltd). The result of the discretion would not be consistent with the purpose of the policy.

Lords Slynn, Hoffmann and Hobhouse concurred with both. £1.5b of annuities needed to be paid in full.

== Significance ==
Equitable Life almost collapsed after the case, because it was unable to meet its additional liability to GAR policyholders, and had to sell assets and close to new business. It triggered an explosion of litigation and bitter recrimination among policyholders, directors, auditors, regulators and the government.

== See also ==
- Scally v Southern Health and Social Services Board [1992] 1 AC 294
- Crossley v Faithful & Gould Holdings Ltd [2004] EWCA Civ 293
- Attorney General of Belize v Belize Telecom Ltd [2009] UKPC 10
- Equitable Life (Payments) Act 2010
