= Oscar Chess Ltd v Williams =

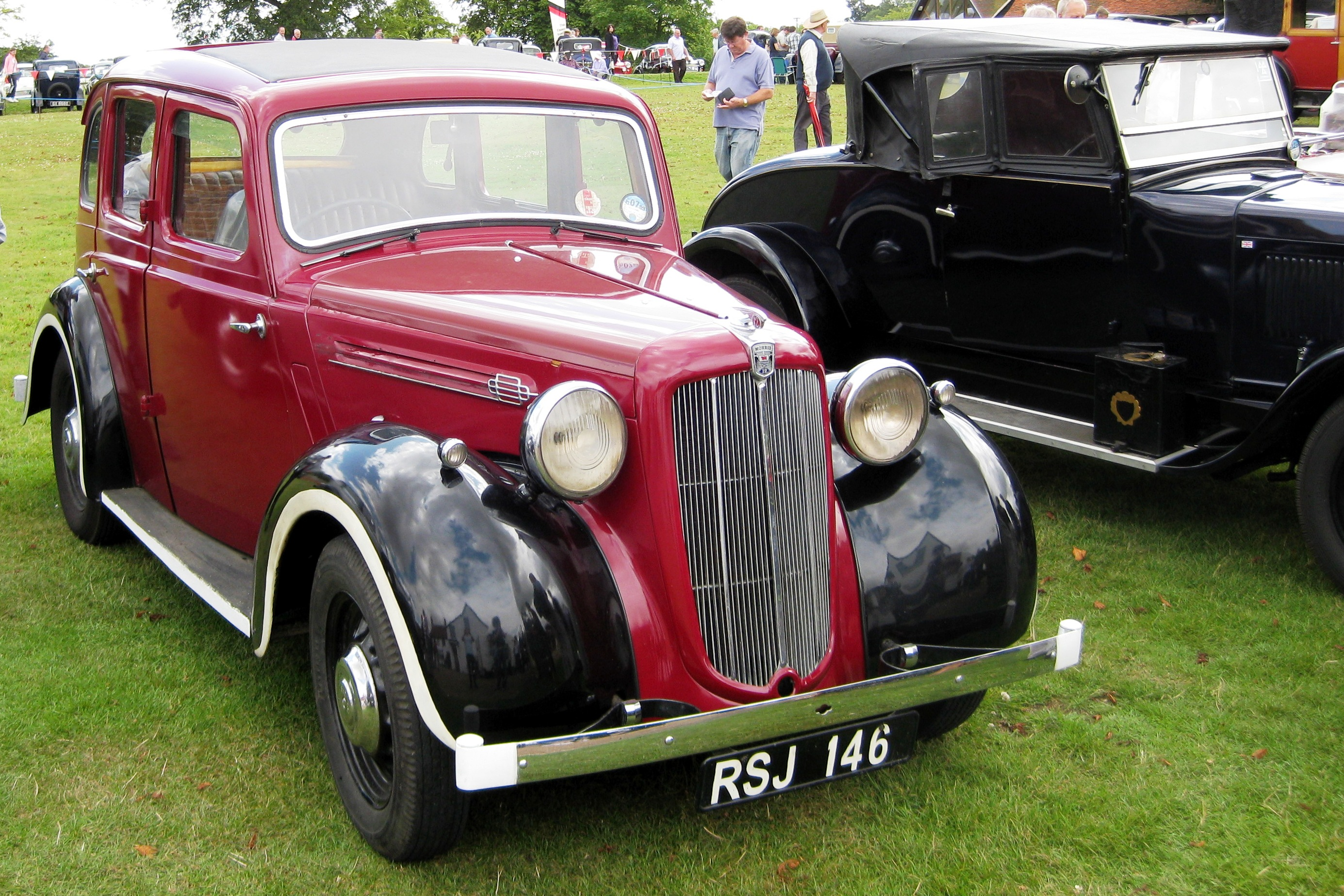
- Morris Motor, 1939 model
- Court: Court of Appeal
- Citation: [1956] EWCA Civ 5. [1957] 1 WLR 370

Case opinions
- Denning LJ

Keywords
- Term, representation, intention

Oscar Chess Ltd v Williams [1957] EWCA Civ 5 is an English contract law case, concerning the difference between a term and a representation.

== Facts ==
Williams traded-in his Morris car to Oscar Chess Ltd at the value of £290, describing the car as a 1948 Morris 10. In reality, it was a 1939 model worth only £175. Williams had declared the car's age in good faith, relying on the car's log book; but the document proved to be a forgery.

== Judgment ==
Denning LJ said the term could only possibly be a warranty, whose ordinary meaning is ‘to denote a binding promise’. In Cross v Gardner Holt CJ held that ‘An affirmation at the time of a sale is a warranty, provided it appears on evidence to be so intended.’ And this was the ordinary English meaning of a binding promise. But in Heilbut, Symons & Co v Buckleton Lord Haldane LC and Lord Moulton said ‘warranty’ in a technical sense, distinguished from a condition. The crucial point of this case was not whether the representation was a warranty or condition, but a term of the contract at all. It followed that Williams’ statement was a mere representation.

One final word… [the motor dealers only checked the log book] eight months later. They are experts, and, not having made that check at the time, I do not think they should now be allowed to recover against the innocent seller who produced to them all the evidence he had, namely, the registration book... If the rogue can be traced, he can be sued by whomsoever has suffered the loss: but if he cannot be traced, the loss must lie where it falls. It should not be inflicted on innocent sellers, who sold the car many months, perhaps many years before…’

It followed that the statement did not become a term because, using the objective test, any "reasonable car dealer" such as Oscar Chess Ltd would not have expected a person with no experience in the car market to be relied upon to guarantee the truth of the statement.

Hodson LJ concurred and Morris LJ dissented because he thought the parties did intend it to be a warranty.

== See also ==
- English contract law
- Routledge v McKay [1954] 1 WLR 615
- Dick Bentley Productions Ltd v Harold Smith (Motors) Ltd [1965] EWCA Civ 2
- Interpreting contracts in English law
