= BP Refinery (Westernport) Pty Ltd v Shire of Hastings =

Judgment of the Privy Council

- Court: Privy Council
- Full case name: BP Refinery (Westernport) Pty Ltd v President, Councillors and Ratepayers of the Shire of Hastings (Victoria)
- Decided: 27 July 1977
- Citations: [1977] UKPC 13; [1977] UKPCHCA 1, (1977) 180 CLR 266

Court membership
- Judges sitting: Lord Wilberforce; Lord Morris; Viscount Dilhorne; Lord Simon; Lord Keith

Case opinions
- (3:2) a term should be implied in the contract to permit the assignment of the rights within the BP group. — Viscount Dilhorne, Lord Simon and Lord Keith

Keywords
- General contractual principles, Construction and interpretation of contracts, Implied terms

BP Refinery (Westernport) Pty Ltd v Shire of Hastings is a leading judgment of the Privy Council which summarised the test for whether a term should implied 'in fact' into a contract, to give effect to the intentions of the contracting parties. While the formulation of the test is not without criticism, it is usually accepted as setting out the tests for the implication of a term into a contract.

== Background ==
In 1963, BP reached an agreement with the Government of Victoria for the establishment of the Westernport Refinery and construction of port facilities at Crib Point, in Western Port, Victoria ("the Refinery Agreement"). The Parliament of Victoria, on the same day it ratified the Refinery Agreement, amended the Local Government Act 1958 to allow local councils to agree on the rates payable for industrial land. In 1964 the Shire of Hastings and BP entered into a Rating Agreement, which set out the rates payable for the following 40 years, and was approved by the Governor ("the Rating Agreement").

BP decided to restructure its Australian operations and on 15 December 1969 wrote to the Shire of Hastings stating "I hope I may assume that there will be no difficulty over transferring" the rights and privileges including the Rating Agreement to BP Australia Ltd. That the Rating Agreement would transfer was apparently so obvious to BP that it did not wait to hear the position of the Shire of Hastings before transferring the assets to BP Australia Ltd. Under the Rating Agreement the rates would have been $50,000; however, the Shire of Hastings said the Rating Agreement no longer applied and assessed the rates in excess of $150,000.

=== The first set of appeals ===
An appeal against the assessment by BP to the County Court was dismissed, as was an appeal to the Supreme Court of Victoria. The Supreme Court held that under the Local Government Act the Shire of Hastings could only validly make an agreement with a particular ratepayer for specified land, and not any person who might subsequently become the ratepayer. While the Rating Agreement applied, if at all, by statutory force, it was regarded by the parties and the court as simply a contract between the parties.

BP could have sought leave to appeal the decision to the High Court of Australia or to the Privy Council, but did not do so. Instead it took steps for BP to resume its occupation of the refinery site in September 1973. The Shire of Hastings again assessed the rates as in excess of $150,000.

=== The decision of the County Court ===
BP refinery was unsuccessful in its appeal to the County Court, where the judge held:

In the end I have come to the conclusion that not only is this a personal contract, as the Supreme Court has already decided, but that there was a fundamental condition of continuing occupancy by the appellant. A reading of the whole of the agreement leads, in my opinion, to the finding that it contemplates that [BP Refinery] will continuously occupy the site and therefore be liable for rates. I am further of the view that the actions of the parties and the correspondence amounted to an agreement that the agreement was at an end or, if it did not, [BP Refinery] was in fundamental breach and the [Shire of Hastings] rescinded the contract by its letter of 9 February 1970, inelegantly expressed though it may have been.

=== The decision of the Supreme Court of Victoria ===
BP appealed to the Supreme Court of Victoria. On 5 May 1976, the Full Court dismissed the appeal, holding that

1. it was an implied condition of the rating agreement that it should continue in operation only so long as BP should be the occupier of the refinery site and rateable as such; so that on BP going out of occupation on 1 January 1970, the rating agreement came to an end;
2. if the agreement had not come to an end by the operation of such an implied term, the letter from BP and the Shire of Hastings amounted to "a mutual acquiescence between the appellant and the Shire that [the rating agreement] was to be treated as discharged"; and
3. it was unnecessary to determine the third – "wider and more difficult" – point argued on behalf of the Shire of Hastings, namely, that there had been a repudiation or fundamental breach of the rating agreement by BP, the rating agreement having allegedly imposed on BP an obligation to remain in occupation of the site and to maintain, operate and use the refinery for the purpose, inter alia, of enabling the rates to be calculated.

== The Appeal to the Privy Council ==
=== The majority decision ===
The majority of the Privy Council, Viscount Dilhorne, Lord Simon and Lord Keith, cited with approval a passage from the judgement in Prenn v Simmonds in which Lord Wilberforce said "In order for the agreement ... to be understood, it must be placed in its context. The time has long passed when agreements, even those under seal, were isolated from the matrix of facts in which they were set and interpreted purely on internal linguistic considerations."

Their Lordships do not think it necessary to review exhaustively the authorities on the implication of a term in a contract which the parties have not thought fit to express. In their view, for a term to be implied, the following conditions (which may overlap) must be satisfied:

1. it must be reasonable and equitable;
2. it must be necessary to give business efficacy to the contract, so that no term will be implied if the contract is effective without it;
3. it must be so obvious that "it goes without saying";
4. it must be capable of clear expression;
5. it must not contradict any express term of the contract.

The test for the implications of terms was not controversial, citing three well known cases for its authority

- The Moorcock
- Reigate v Union Manufacturing Co
- Shirlaw v Southern Foundries (1926) Ltd

In applying these principles, the majority took into account the surrounding circumstances, including that:

- the investment by BP was irrevocable in that once the refinery was built, it was not practical to move it.
- the Rating Agreement was set within the framework of the Refinery Agreement, not only by implication but also by express reference.
- the Refinery Agreement contained provision for assignment within the BP group in Australia.

The majority held that the term found by the Supreme Court of Victoria, that the agreement would end once BP ceased to be liable to pay rates on the property, was not necessary to give business efficacy to the Rating Agreement and that it was wholly unreasonable and inequitable to limit the ability of the BP group to make changes in its corporate structure. The identity of the particular member of the BP group could not have been of the least importance to the Shire of Hastings.

Instead they found implied an entirely different term, said to make the Rating Agreement accord with the Refinery Agreement to permit the assignment of the rights within the BP group.

The majority found that what was obvious to the County Court, the judges of the Supreme Court and indeed two of their colleagues, was wrong and that those judges had missed what should have been obvious.

=== The dissenting judgement ===
Lord Wilberforce and Lord Morris dissented. The difference of opinion was not on the question of principle, but rather on the application of those principles. Their Lordships noted that:

- The 1973 decision of the Supreme Court was not the subject of appeal;
- BP Australia paid rates on the ordinary basis;
- The argument which the majority upheld, was not put forward in either court below and was inconsistent with the decision of the Full Court in the 1973 case concerned with BP, and involved contending that that unappealed decision was wrong;
- The definition of Company adopted by the majority contradicted the definition in the Rating Agreement.

== Significance ==
The decision has been adopted and applied in numerous decisions, both in Australia and England.

=== In Australia ===
- Secured Income Real Estate (Aust) Ltd v St Martins Investments Pty Ltd Mason J accepted and applied Lord Simon's formulation, holding that "[t]he fact that such a provision would provide a greater protection for the respondent is not a sufficient reason for implying it".
- In Codelfa Construction Pty Ltd v State Rail Authority of NSW, implication of a term in fact in a contract, by reference to what is necessary to give it business efficacy, was described as raising issues "as to the meaning and effect of the contract". Implication is not "an orthodox exercise in the interpretation of the language of a contract, that is, assigning a meaning to a particular provision". It is nevertheless an "exercise in interpretation, though not an orthodox instance". Brennan J also applied the test formulated by Lord Simon. His Honour was circumspect with regards to the application of the test in BP Refinery, holding that if the majority judgment had sought to derive the implication of a term from the matrix of facts in which the contract was made then it did not accord with sound principle.
- In Hospital Products Ltd v US Surgical Corporation, Deane J noted that the test formulated by Lord Simon was "concerned with the question whether a term should be implied in a formal contract which was complete upon its face and care should be taken to avoid an over-rigid application of the cumulative criteria which they specify to a case such as the present where the contract is oral or partly oral and where the parties have never attempted to reduce it to complete written form."
- Byrne v Australian Airlines Ltd held that the implication of a term in fact is based upon the presumed or imputed intention of the parties. It is necessary to arrive at some conclusion as to the actual intention of the parties before considering any presumed or imputed intention. That the inclusion of a term of an award as a term of the contract would, if it were breached, support an action for damages by the employee was not a ground for saying that the term was necessary for the reasonable or effective operation of the contract. That is the proposed term went to remedies for breach and not to the question of obligations.

=== In England ===
- In Philips Electronique Grand Public SA v British Sky Broadcasting Ltd, Sir Thomas Bingham MR described Lord Simon's formulation as a summary which "distil[led] the essence of much learning on implied terms" but whose "simplicity could be almost misleading". Sir Thomas then explained that it was "difficult to infer with confidence what the parties must have intended when they have entered into a lengthy and carefully-drafted contract but have omitted to make provision for the matter in issue", because "it may well be doubtful whether the omission was the result of the parties' oversight or of their deliberate decision", or indeed the parties might suspect that "they are unlikely to agree on what is to happen in a certain ... eventuality" and "may well choose to leave the matter uncovered in their contract in the hope that the eventuality will not occur". Sir Thomas went on to say this at p 482:
  The question of whether a term should be implied, and if so what, almost inevitably arises after a crisis has been reached in the performance of the contract. So the court comes to the task of implication with the benefit of hindsight, and it is tempting for the court then to fashion a term which will reflect the merits of the situation as they then appear. Tempting, but wrong. [He then quoted the observations of Scrutton LJ in Reigate, and continued] [I]t is not enough to show that had the parties foreseen the eventuality which in fact occurred they would have wished to make provision for it, unless it can also be shown either that there was only one contractual solution or that one of several possible solutions would without doubt have been preferred ...
- Attorney General of Belize v Belize Telecom Ltd, a case decided by the Privy Council, Lord Hoffmann said:
  22. ... [I]t is not enough for a court to consider that the implied term expresses what it would have been reasonable for the parties to agree to. It must be satisfied that it is what the contract actually means.
  27. The Board considers that this list [in BP Refinery (Westernport) v Shire of Hastings] is best regarded, not as series of independent tests which must each be surmounted, but rather as a collection of different ways in which judges have tried to express the central idea that the proposed implied term must spell out what the contract actually means, or in which they have explained why they did not think that it did so.
- In Marks and Spencer plc v BNP Paribas Securities Services Trust Company (Jersey) Ltd Lord Neuberger (with whom Lord Sumption and Lord Hodge concurred) questioned whether Lord Simon's first requirement, reasonableness and equitableness, adds anything in that if a term satisfies the other requirements it is likely to be reasonable and equitable. Business necessity and obviousness could be alternatives, although it would be a rare case where only one of those two requirements would be satisfied. Lord Neuberger thought "to speak of construing the contract as a whole, including the implied terms, is not helpful, not least because it begs the question as to what construction actually means in this context."

=== Criticism of the test ===
The criterion of "necessity" has been described as "elusive" and "somewhat protean". It has been suggested that "there is much to be said for abandoning" the concept of necessity. As for the projected 40-year life of the refinery, it closed in 1985.
