= Formal contract =

A formal contract is a contract where the parties have signed under seal, while an informal contract is one not under seal. A seal can be any impression made upon the document by the parties to the contract. This was traditionally done in wax stating the intentions of the parties to be bound by the contract. Only parties to a sealed document are the people who have rights under it, thus only people party to the contract can be found liable. According to Harvey Boller, J.D. Professor of Law at Loyola University, roughly 100 percent of contracts today are informal contracts.

The legitimacy of a contract, however, does not rely upon whether a contract is formal or informal. Both are considered binding, given all other elements of a contract exist. In which both parties agree to comply with each other's wishes to a certain limit. Usually, the contract is formed by a greater authority, such as a government, or corporation.

The Twelfth Edition of Business Law: Text Cases (Clarkson, Miller & Cross), says that formal contracts are, "contracts that require a special form or method of creation to be enforceable." It uses negotiable instruments as an example of formal contracts, such as: checks, drafts, promissory notes, and certificates of deposit. These examples are all required to have special formation under the Uniform Commercial Code.
