= Nash v Paragon Finance plc =

2001 Court of Appeal concerning unfair terms in English contract law

Paragon Finance plc v Nash
- Full case name: Paragon Finance plc v Nash and Staunton
- Citations: [2001] EWCA Civ 1466, [2002] 1 WLR 685, [2002] 2 All ER 248

Keywords
- Unfair terms

Paragon Finance plc v Nash [2001] EWCA Civ 1466 is an English contract law case concerning unfair contract terms.

== Facts ==
Paragon (t/a National Home Loans Corporation plc until 1997) was claiming possession from Mr and Mrs Nash in South Norwood for late mortgage repayments. Paragon’s rate of interest was variable at its discretion. The Bank of England lowered its interest rate. Paragon did not ‘pass on’ the lower rate. Nash claimed that they were being made to pay substantially over the market rate of interest for secured loans, and were unable to find another lender because they had fallen into arrears. Mr & Mrs Nash argued that the interest rates were extortionate under the Consumer Credit Act 1974 section 138 (grossly exorbitant, grossly contravenes principles of fair trading; regard had to prevailing interest rates and risk).

== Judgment ==
Dyson LJ held that the power to vary the interest rate at its discretion had to be exercised in a rational and honest way. This implied term was ‘necessary in order to give effect to the reasonable expectations of the parties.’ [36] and [42] However, in this case the bank was acting reasonably in protecting its interests. It was not grossly exorbitant. Nor was the term unfair under UCTA 1977 section 3(2)(b)(i), because part of the ‘contractual performance’ was the discretion and its exercise was what could be reasonably expected.

Thorpe LJ and Astill J concurred.

== Significance ==
John McFall of the Treasury Select Committee said that banks are ‘defying the laws of financial arithmetic’ by not passing on the cuts in interest rates to consumers. For instance, Barclays is still charging 14.9% on credit card repayments, while the Bank’s rate is 3%.

== See also ==
- English contract law
