= British Crane Hire Corp Ltd v Ipswich Plant Hire Ltd =

English contract law case

British Crane Hire Corporation Ltd v Ipswich Plant Hire Ltd
- Court: Court of Appeal
- Citations: [1973] EWCA Civ 6, [1975] QB 303

Case opinions
- Lord Denning MR

Keywords
- Common understanding, term incorporation, course of dealing

British Crane Hire Corporation Ltd v Ipswich Plant Hire Ltd [1973] EWCA Civ 6 is an English contract law case concerning the issue of incorporation of terms with regular business dealings.

== Facts ==
British Crane Hire Corporation Ltd and Ipswich Plant Hire Ltd carried on plant hire businesses. They had contracted with one another previously in February and October 1969, when a printed form was used. In June 1970, Ipswich Plant needed a crane urgently. Ipswich Plant’s manager had been unaware of previous dealings, but hire and transport charges were agreed by phone, and British Crane delivered. A form followed. This provided the hirers would pay for recovery expenses. Ipswich Plant did not sign it on this occasion. The crane sank into marshland and got stuck in the mud. British Crane recovered the crane with considerable cost. British Crane argued that the unsigned form was incorporated into the oral contract, given their previous dealings.

At first instance the judge held the term putting the cost of recovery on the hirer was not incorporated. British Crane appealed.

== Judgment ==
Lord Denning's ruling is known for its typically laconic opening sentence:

In June 1970, a big earth-moving machine got stuck in the mud. It sank so far as to be out of sight. It cost much money to get it out. Who is to pay the cost?

Denning held the clause was incorporated, so Ipswich Plant had to reimburse for the recovery expenses.

In Hollier v Rambler Motors [1972] 2 QB, page 76, Lord Justice Salmon said he knew of no case "in which it has been decided or even argued that a term could be implied into an oral contract on the strength of a course of dealing (if it can be so called) which consisted at the most of three or four transactions over a period of five years". That was a case of a private individual who had had his car repaired by the defendants and had signed forms with conditions on three or four occasions. The plaintiff there was not of equal bargaining power with the garage company which repaired the car. The conditions were not incorporated.

But here the parties were both in the trade and were of equal bargaining power. Each was a firm of plant hirers who hired out plant. The defendants themselves knew that firms in the plant-hiring trade always imposed conditions in regard to the hiring of plant: and that their conditions were on much the same lines. The Defendants' manager, Mr Turner (who knew the crane), was asked about it. He agreed that he had seen these conditions or similar ones in regard to the hiring of plant. He said that most of them were, to one extent or another, variations of a form which he called "the Contractors' Plant Association form". The defendants themselves (when they let out cranes) used the conditions of that form. The conditions on the plaintiffs' form were in rather different words, but nevertheless to much the same effect... [Lord Denning MR quoted from exchanges at trial]

From that evidence it is clear that both parties knew quite well that conditions were habitually imposed by the supplier of these machines: and both parties knew the substance of those conditions. In particular that, if the crane sank in soft ground, it was the hirer's job to recover it: and that there was an indemnity clause. In these circumstances, I think the conditions on the form should be regarded as Incorporated into the contract. I would not put it so much on the course of dealing, but rather on the common understanding which is to be derived from the conduct of the parties, namely, that the hiring was to be on the terms of the plaintiffs' usual conditions.

Megaw and Sachs LJJ concurred.

== See also ==
- English contract law
