= Dick Bentley Productions Ltd v Harold Smith (Motors) Ltd =

Dick Bentley Ltd v Harold Smith Ltd
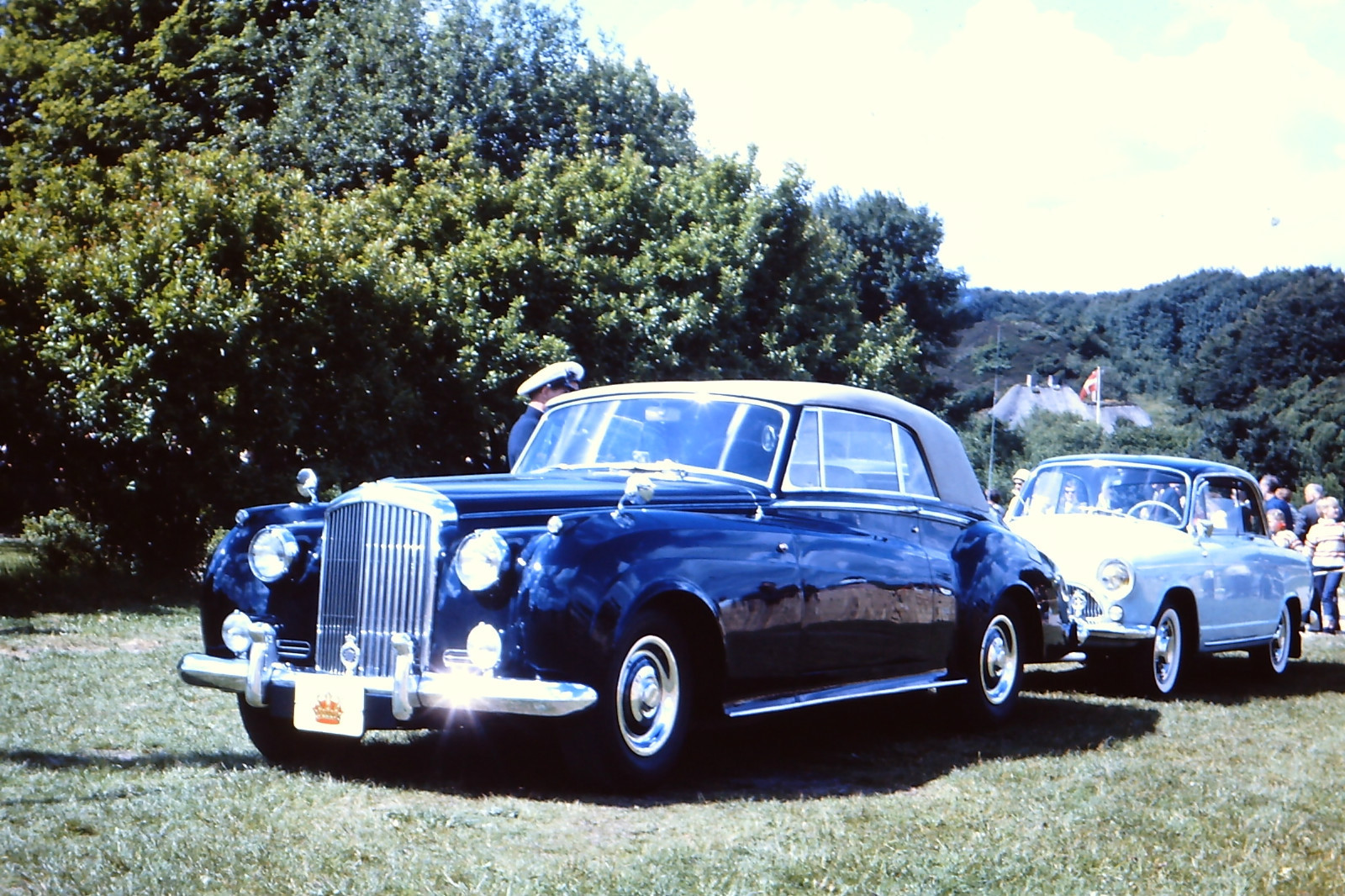
- A Bentley Motor
- Court: Court of Appeal
- Citations: [1965] EWCA Civ 2, [1965] 1 WLR 623

Keywords
- Contract, term

Dick Bentley Productions Ltd v Harold Smith (Motors) Ltd [1965] EWCA Civ 2 is an English contract law case, concerning the difference between a representation and a contract term. It shows that a bona fide consumer is entitled to rely on the word of a dealer (who is naturally presumed to be an expert).

== Facts ==
Dick Bentley Productions Ltd wanted a ‘well vetted’ Bentley. Harold Smith (Motors) Ltd, car dealers, found one that they said had done only 20,000 miles since a replacement engine. It later emerged that the Bentley had covered 100,000 since the engine and gearbox had been replaced. Dick Bentley sued Harold Smith for breach of warranty, and was successful before the trial judge.

== Judgment ==
The Court of Appeal held that the statement of how many miles were done was a term of the contract because the Harold Smith (Motors) Ltd were car dealers and in a better position to know than the claimant about the truth of the statement. This affects the parties' intention to incorporate a term into a contract. Lord Denning MR said the following.

The first point is whether this representation, namely that it had done 20,000 miles only since it had been fitted with a replacement engine and gearbox, was an innocent misrepresentation (which does not give rise to damages), or whether it was a warranty. It was said by Chief Justice Holt, and repeated in Heilbut, Symons & Go. -v- Buckleton, reported in 1913 Appeal Cases at page 49:

"An affirmation at the time of the sale is a warranty, provided it appear on evidence to be so intended".

But that word "intended" has given rise to difficulties. I endeavoured to explain in Oscar Chess Ltd. -v- Williams in 1957, 1 Weekly Law Reports, page 375, that the question whether a warranty was intended depends on the conduct of the parties, on their words and behaviour, rather than on their thoughts. If an intelligent bystander would reasonably infer that a warranty was intended, that will suffice. What conduct, then? What words and behaviour lead to the inference of a warranty?

Looking at the cases once more, as we have done so often, it seems to me that if a representation is made in the course of dealings for a contract for the very purpose of inducing the other party to act upon it, and actually inducing him to act upon it, by entering into the contract, that is prima facie ground for inferring that it was intended as a warranty. It is not necessary to speak of it as being collateral. Suffice it that it was intended to be acted upon and was in fact acted on. But the maker of the representation can rebut this inference if he can show that it really was an innocent misrepresentation, in that he was in fact innocent of fault in making it, and that it would not be reasonable in the circumstances for him to be bound by it. In the Oscar Chess case the inference was rebutted. There a man had bought a second-hand car and received with it a log-book which stated the year of the car, '194-8. He afterwards resold the car. When he resold it he simply repeated what was in the log-book and passed it on to the buyer. He honestly believed on reasonable grounds that it was true. He was completely innocent of any fault. There was no warranty by him but only an innocent misrepresentation.. Whereas in the present case it is very different. The inference is not rebutted. Here we have a dealer, Mr. Smith, who was in a position to know, or at least to find out, the history of the car. He could get it by writing to the makers. He did not do so. Indeed it was done later. When the history of this car was examined, his statement turned out to be quite wrong. He ought to have known better. There was no reasonable foundation for it.

Salmon LJ and Danckwerts LJ agreed.

== See also ==
- English contract law
- Oscar Chess Ltd v Williams
