= The Moorcock =

English contract law case

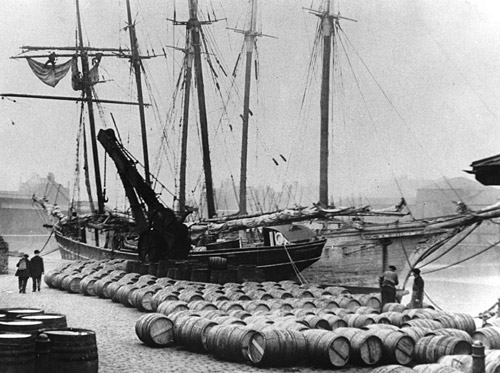
- Court: Court of Appeal
- Citation: (1889) 14 PD 64

Court membership
- Judge sitting: Bowen LJ

Keywords
- Implied term, business efficacy

The Moorcock (1889) 14 PD 64 is a leading English contract law case which created an important test for identifying the main terms that the law will imply in commercial, or non-consumer, agreements, especially terms that are "necessary and obvious...to give business efficacy". Terms shall not be implied merely because they appear "desirable and reasonable". The case has been widely cited in later cases and is narrowly distinguished.

== Facts ==
The owners of the ship called The Moorcock contracted for space at a wharf owner's jetty in order to unload The Moorcock's cargo. While docked, the tide went down to a point where the hull of the ship hit a ridge, causing damage to the ship. The plaintiff argued that the wharfingers were responsible to ensure that his vessel would remain safe while docked. The wharf owners, in their defence, claimed that there were no provisions in the contract to ensure the vessel's safety and that they could not have foreseen the damage caused to the vessel. The issue before the Court was whether there can be any implied warranty given the circumstances. The trial court found that there was an implied warranty.

== Judgment ==
The Court held for the ship owner, ruling that there was an implied term that the wharfingers had taken reasonable steps to ascertain the state of the riverbed adjacent to the jetty (not, as often stated, an implied term that the jetty would be a safe place to dock). If the wharfingers had taken such responsibility, then they would have discovered the ridge of rock and would have been under the duty to warn the shipowners of the potential hazard. Failure to warn would have been actionable in tort. Therefore, this very restricted term was sufficient to provide protection to the shipowners as it would have been necessary to give the contracted business efficacy. Bowen LJ stated that any implied warranties must be based on the presumed intentions of the parties. An implied warranty may be read into a contract for reasons of "business efficacy", and in order to maintain the presumed intention of the parties. As Bowen LJ said:

In business transactions such as this, what the law desires to effect by the implication is to give such business efficacy to the transaction as must have been intended at all events by both parties who are business men; not to impose on one side all perils of the transaction, or to emancipate one side from all the chances of failure, but to make each party promise in law as much, at all events as it must have been in the contemplation of both parties that he should be responsible for in respect to those perils or chances.

Bowen LJ looked at the presumed risks of the agreement and who was expected to bear them. The wharfingers were in such a position that they could have discovered there was a risk of damage to the ship, and would have been in the best position to judge the safety of the vessel.

== See also ==
- English contract law
- Implied terms in English law
