= List of Scottish legal cases =

Landmark or leading Scottish legal cases include:

== Constitutional and Public Law ==
- Burmah Oil Co. v Lord Advocate [1965] AC 75
- MacCormick v Lord Advocate 1953 SC 396
- Bannatyne v Overtoun [1904] AC 515
- West v Secretary of State for Scotland 1992 SC 385
- R (Miller) v The Prime Minister and Cherry v Advocate General for Scotland [2019] CSIH 49, then [2019] UKSC 41

== Contract ==
- Boyd & Forest v Glasgow & South-Western Railway Co. 1912 SC(HL) 93
- Dumbarton Steamboat Co. Ltd. v MacFarlane (1899) 1 F 993
- Hunter v General Accident, Fire and Life Assurance Corpn. 1909 SC(HL) 30
- Jacobsen, Sons & Co. v E Underwood & Son Ltd. (1894) 21 R 654
- Morrisson v Robertson 1908 SC 332
- Morton's Trustees v Aged Christian Friend Society of Scotland (1899) 2 F 82
- Philip & Co. v Knoblauch 1907 SC 994
- Wolf and Wolf v Forfar Potato Co 1984 SLT 100
- Smith v Bank of Scotland 1997 SC(HL) 111

== Criminal ==
- Brennan v HM Advocate 1977 JC 38
- Cadder v HM Advocate 2010 UKSC 43
- Cawthorne v HM Advocate 1968 JC 32
- Cinci v HM Advocate 2004
- Crawford v HM Advocate 1950 JC 67
- Drury v HM Advocate 2001 SCCR 583
- HM Advocate v Ross 1991 JC 210
- Jamieson v HM Advocate 1994 SLT 537
- Khaliq v HM Advocate 1984 JC 23
- McKearney v HM Advocate 2004
- HM Advocate v Sheridan and Sheridan 2010
- Smart v HM Advocate 1975 JC 30
- Smith v Donnelly 2001 SLT 1007
- Sutherland v HM Advocate 1994 SLT 634

== Delict ==
- Bourhill v Young [1943] AC 92
- Donoghue v Stevenson 1932 SC(HL) 31
- Hughes v Lord Advocate
- Kay's Tutor v Ayrshire & Arran Health Board
- Titchener v British Railways Board

== Enrichment ==
- Morgan Guaranty Trust Company of New York v Lothian Regional Council 1995 SC 151
- Shilliday v Smith 1998 SC 725
- Dollar Land (Cumbernauld) Ltd v CIN Properties Ltd 1998 SC(HL) 90

== Property ==
- MacLeod v Kerr 1965 SC 253
- Sharp v Thomson 1997 SC(HL) 66
- The Douglas Case ca 1745 (see Lord Monboddo)

== Trusts ==
- McCaig v University of Glasgow 1907 SC 231
