= Power of acceptance =

Concept in contract law

Power of acceptance is a concept of contract law. It refers to the power vested in the offeree by the offeror through the offer being made. It is used to determine whether the acceptance of an offer is valid.

== Contract formation ==
Generally speaking, a contract is created by an offer and the corresponding acceptance. An offeree exercises the power of acceptance in order to trigger the offeror's obligation of performance with reference to the terms of the offer. Disputes may arise as to whether the power of acceptance is valid at the time the acceptance is made, therefore challenging the very existence of the contract.

In the English case Gibson v Manchester City Council, Lord Diplock recognised that the conventional offer and acceptance analysis may not be suitable for every single type of contract, as there may not be any expressive offer and acceptance. In another English case RTS Flexible Systems Ltd v Molkerei Alois Müller GmbH & Co KG, Lord Clarke reconfirmed that contract formation had to be examined objectively, that is, not taking into account the subjective state of mind of the parties.

In contract law, there are established rules and principles for various issues concerning contract formation, such as cross offers, awareness of offer, notification of acceptance, timing of acceptance, and postal rule. Power of acceptance is part of the contract formation analysis, and which concerns the validity of acceptance. Such rules and principles can be used for examining objectively those contracts which do not manifest an exchange of articulated offer and acceptance.

== Exercise of power of acceptance ==
The type of an offer determines how the power of acceptance is to be exercised for creating a binding contract.

=== Bilateral offer ===
A bilateral offer is a promise inviting for a promise. The offeree exercises the power of acceptance by way of giving a second promise to the offeror that the obligations under the first promise will be performed. A bilateral contract is created when there is an exchange of promises between at least two parties. Under the mirror image rule, the terms of the final contract are those stated in the offer, that is, the first promise. The offeree must accept the offer as a whole without any variation, otherwise the acceptance will become invalid.

In the English case Hyde v Wrench, the defendant offered to sell a property to the plaintiff for £1,200. The plaintiff rejected the offer. The defendant made a second offer to sell the property to the plaintiff for £1,000. The plaintiff then wrote back and offered to buy the property for £950. The defendant rejected the offer. The plaintiff then tried to accept the second offer. However, the defendant refused to sell. It was held that the second offer of £1,000 was terminated when the counter offer of £950 was made, and that the second offer could not be revived just because the counter offer was rejected. An offer must therefore be accepted unconditionally for creating a valid binding contract.

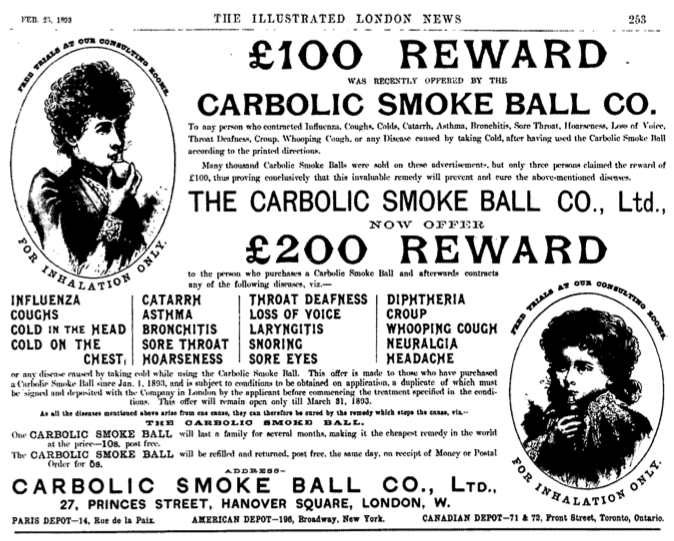
Advertisement by Carbolic Smoke Ball Co

=== Unilateral offer ===
A unilateral offer is a promise inviting for an act. The promisee exercises the power of acceptance by way of action without the need to communicate acceptance to the promisor. The promisor assumes the obligation under the promise at the moment the promisee has performed the act which fully satisfies the conditions stated in the promise.

In the English case Carlill v Carbolic Smoke Ball Co, the defendant company made an advertisement that it promised to pay £100 to anyone who was infected with influenza even after using its smoke ball. The advertisement stated the specified time period and manner in which the smoke ball was to be used. The defendant also said that it had deposited £1,000 in a bank for any claims. The plaintiff consumer used the smoke ball in reliance on the advertisement but still caught the influenza. She then sued the defendant for the promised £100. It was held that the promise was a unilateral offer which was liable to anyone who performed the stipulated conditions on the faith of the advertisement.

== Termination of power of acceptance ==
The power of acceptance can be terminated in a number of ways, either by the offeror, the offeree, or operation of law.

=== Expiration or lapse of offer ===
==== General rule ====
If there is a date or event specified in the offer before which the offer must be accepted, then the power of acceptance remains valid until that particular date or the occurrence of that particular event.

==== Reasonable time ====
If there is nothing being specified in the offer, then the power of acceptance will lapse at the end of a reasonable time. What constitutes a "reasonable time" depends on the case circumstances, such as the nature of the subject matter. In the English case Ramsgate Victoria Hotel Co v Montefiore, the defendant applied for shares in June but did not hear the result until November. During those five months, the respondent did not withdraw the application. When the allotment was finally made, the defendant refused to pay. The plaintiff brought an action for specific performance of the contract. It was held that the allotment must be made within a reasonable period of time. Taking into consideration the nature of shares (price fluctuation), a period of five months was too long that the defendant's offer to purchase shares had lapsed. The defendant was therefore not bound to accept the allotment.

==== Delayed acceptance ====
In a case where a reasonable time has lapsed, but the offeree does in good faith believe the length of time so passed is reasonable, there may still be a chance a contract is created, despite the delay of acceptance. In the American case Phillips v. Moor, it was held that if a reasonable time had passed, and the offeror decided to retract the offer, he had a duty to inform the offeree that the acceptance was too late. If the offeror failed to do so, he would be bound by such a late acceptance as a matter of fairness.

==== Conversation rule ====
In the US, the comment to section 41 of Restatement (Second) of Contracts stipulates the conversation rule that if the parties negotiate face to face or over the telephone, the offer must be accepted by the end of that conversation, or the offer will lapse automatically, unless intention shows otherwise. In the American case Textron, Inc. v. Froelich, the plaintiff steel fabricator made a verbal offer to the defendant steel broker to sell steel at a specified price. The broker did not accept the offer by the end of the conservation, and said that he need to check with his clients. Five weeks later, the broker called the fabricator to confirm the order. However, he refused to take the delivery of steel at the end, and argued that under the conservation rule, his power of acceptance was no longer valid. It was held that the jury was entitled to find the verbal offer did extend beyond the end of the conservation, as it was normal for a steel broker to confirm with his clients before accepting an offer.

=== Revocation of offer ===
==== General rule ====
If an offer is not irrevocable, then the offeror may revoke the offer at any time before acceptance, provided that such revocation is effectively communicated to the offeree.

==== Indirect revocation ====
The intention of revoking the offer must be communicated to the offeree, and that can be done either by the offeror or through a reliable third-party source. In the English case Dickinson v Dodds, the defendant offered to sell a property to the plaintiff. The plaintiff later learnt from a third person that the defendant had changed his mind, but nevertheless tried to accept the offer. The defendant refused to go through the transaction, as he had already sold the property to someone else. The plaintiff brought an action against the defendant for breach of contract. It was held that the acquisition of knowledge regarding the revocation of offer from a reliable third party would suffice. An effective communication does not necessarily need to come from the offeror.

==== Firm offer rule ====
A bilateral offer can be revoked by the offeror at any time before acceptance. Under the firm offer rule, the fact that the offeror has promised the offeree to keep the offer open for acceptance for a certain period of time does not render such an offer irrevocable. It is because a promise without consideration is unenforceable in contract law. However, if the offeree provides consideration to the offeror for the purpose of keeping the offer open, then the offer becomes irrevocable. This is called an option. If the offer is irrevocable and the offeror revokes the offer, then the offeror is liable for expectation damages for revoking the offer before acceptance.

In the US, section 87(1)(a) of Restatement (Second) of Contracts provides an exception to the firm-offer rule. If an offer includes the details of consideration, and is signed by the offeror, for the purpose of exchange of promises within a reasonable time, then the offer is enforceable, provided that there is nominal consideration. Here, nominal consideration can be as little as one dollar.

==== Unilateral offer ====
Once an offeree has begun the performance in reliance on the unilateral offer, an implied obligation may apply to the offeror that the promise cannot be revoked. In the English case Errington v Wood, a father bought a house for his son and daughter-in-law to live in. He paid one-third of the price, and said to his son and daughter-in-law that if they paid the regular mortgage instalments for the remaining two-thirds of the price until the mortgage was paid off, then he would transfer the title of the house to them. Subsequently, the father died, and the mother claimed possession of the house. It was held that the father's promise to convey the title to the son and daughter-in-law was irrevocable once they had begun paying the regular mortgage instalments. No order of possession was therefore granted.

However, there are situations where the court views the implied obligation as unjustified. In the English case Luxor (Eastbourne) Ltd v Cooper, the plaintiff property agent introduced a prospective buyer to the defendant property owner. But the defendant then changed his mind and decided not to complete the transaction. It was held that the defendant was free to call off the transaction without being liable to pay commission to the plaintiff. The plaintiff ran his own risk of not having the deal completed.

In the US, section 45 of Restatement (First) of Contracts recognises the performance of the invited act stated in the offer by the offeree as part of the consideration, and the offeror's obligation to perform his promise in the offer is conditional upon the completion of that invited act. The commencement of performance by the offeree is therefore regarded as an option.

=== Rejection, counter offer and conditional acceptance ===
==== Rejection rule ====
If an offer is rejected by the offeree, then the offer as well as the power of acceptance which comes with it are terminated at once.

==== Counter offer rule ====
A counter offer is an offer which concerns the same subject matter but with different terms than the original offer. If a counter-offer is made by the offeree to the offeror, then the original offer is deemed rejected, and the power of acceptance included in the original offer is terminated.

==== Conditional acceptance rule ====
A conditional or partial acceptance is essentially amending the terms of the original offer, and is considered as a counter-offer.

==== Asking for further information ====
During contract formation, parties may exchange communications regarding the offer, and such communications do not necessarily constitute a rejection or counter-offer. In the English case Stevenson, Jacques & Co v Mclean, the defendant offered to sell iron to the claimant, and the plaintiff telegraphed the defendant if payment could be made over two months. The defendant ignored the telegraph and sold the iron to a third party. At the end, the plaintiff accepted the offer before deadline, but the defendant refused to assume the obligation under the offer. It was held that the plaintiff's enquiry about the payment terms did not kill the offer, and the defendant was bound to honour the offer.

In the US, section 38(2) of Restatement (Second) of Contracts provides an exception to the counter offer rule. If the offeree makes a counter offer to the offeror, together with a statement that the original offer is being taken under further advisement, then the counter-offer will not terminate the original offer.

Moreover, the comment to section 59 of Restatement (Second) of Contracts stipulates that if the offeree includes some conditions in the acceptance, and such conditions are implied in the offer, then the acceptance is not considered as conditional. In the American case Panhandle Eastern Pipe Line Co. v. Smith, the plaintiff company dismissed the defendant employee, but the plaintiff made an offer by means of a letter to withdraw the dismissal if the defendant would agree to comply with certain terms and conditions. The defendant signed the letter, and added a condition that he would be able to see his personnel record.

=== Death ===
==== General rule ====
If an offer is revocable, and the offeror's death occurs before acceptance, then the offeree's power of acceptance may or may not be terminated, depending on whether the offeree has notice of the offeror's death at the time of acceptance.

Historically, in the English case of Bradbury v Morgan (1862) it was found that an offer could be accepted, provided that the offeree had no notice of the offeror's death at the material time, whereas in Coulthart v Clemenston (1879) it was held that the offeree could not accept the offer after being notified of the offeror's death. In the latter case, "the notice, and not the mere fact of death" was the key factor.

==== Reliance ====
Reasonable reliance on an offer by the offeree, even without the notice of the offeror's death, will not make the offeror's estate liable. In the American case Browne v. McDonald, a man sent his niece to the plaintiff school. Before he died, he promised the plaintiff that he would pay the expenses so incurred. The niece stayed in the school for two years, during which the plaintiff learnt that the man had died. The defendant who was the man's estate refused to pay. The plaintiff then sued the defendant for payment. It was held that liability was terminated upon the offeror's death. It was irrelevant to consider whether the plaintiff had no notice of the offeror's death and had substantial, reasonable reliance.

==== Individual capacity ====
If the subject matter of the offer is personal in nature, then the offer will lapse upon the offeror's death. It is because the offer concerns the offeror's individual capacity that whose performance of duties is unique. It is therefore unlikely that the deceased's estate would be able to find substitute performance in the open market.

==== Survivability ====
An offer will not survive the offeror's death, despite there is an express intention by the offeror for that to happen. In the American case In re Estate of Severtson, a woman put in writing that her neighbours would be able to purchase her property for $100,000 after her death. Upon the woman's death, the neighbours exercised the option. But the deceased's estate refused to go through the transaction. It was held that the offer would not survive the offeror's death, as the offeror's assent was required for contract formation.

== Efficient reliance ==
=== Value maximisation ===
The economic theory of efficient reliance can be used to understand the reasoning of the case law concerning the duration of the power of acceptance. It is suggested that when a court decides a dispute about contract formation, it has two options. The first option focuses on the transaction value that the court will pick the set of rules which are likely to maximise such value for most parties. The second option emphasises on the overall efficiency that the court will adopt the set of rules which can be put together in a formula for easy administration. However, as far as the contractual parties are concerned, the concept of reliance refers to any action by one party due to the expectation that the other party will perform the contract. https://en.wikipedia.org/w/index.php?title=Power_of_acceptance&action=submit For example, party A is a beverage supplier, and party B is a bottle supplier. In order to cope with the increasing market demand, party A contracts to buy two times more bottles from party B, and such bottles are unique in the market. For the same purpose, party A also contracts to buy one more tailor-made bottling machine which only fits those unique bottles from another party at the same time. If party B performs the contract, party A will enjoy a higher value, as it will be able to utilise the extra bottling machine. But if party B does not perform, party A will suffer a greater harm, as it will not be able to make use of the machine. In this scenario, the investment in the machine is likely to qualify as reliance. The efficiency level of reliance is the calculation of potential gains and losses of the parties, and the net of which is the maximum transaction value.

One of the situations where power of acceptance is terminated is that the offer in question is not accepted within a "reasonable time", and what constitutes a "reasonable time" depends on the case circumstances. If the offer does not specify the deadline, the court will fix the problem by either stipulating the length of time on its own, or finding out the offeror's intention as to the length of time during which the offer could be accepted on an objective basis. The latter approach requires a loss-and-gain analysis. It is noted that for cases involving a volatile market conditions, such as price fluctuations, the focus is on the hardship on the offeror. However, there are cases where it was held that an offer could have been intended to remain open for a longer time, as that was a means contemplated by the offeror to induce the offeree's reliance, which was a substantial gain for the offeror.

=== Safeguarding measures ===
There are a number of suggested self-help measures for protecting reliance and keeping flexibility at the same time in contract formation. Such measures include the option to abandon, preliminary agreements, and breakup fees. However, if there is nothing being agreed about detrimental reliance, the suffering party can sue for consequential damages.

== See also ==
- Contract
- Frustration
- Reliance damages
