= Scottish criminal law =

Scots criminal law relies far more heavily on common law than in England and Wales. Scottish criminal law includes offences against the person of murder, culpable homicide, rape and assault, offences against property such as theft and malicious mischief, and public order offences including mobbing and breach of the peace. Scottish criminal law can also be found in the statutes of the UK Parliament with some areas of criminal law, such as misuse of drugs and traffic offences appearing identical on both sides of the Border. Scottish criminal law can also be found in the statute books of the Scottish Parliament such as the Sexual Offences (Scotland) Act 2009 (2009 asp 9) and Prostitution (Public Places) (Scotland) Act 2007 (2007 asp 11) which only apply to Scotland. In fact, the Scots requirement of corroboration in criminal matters changes the practical prosecution of crimes derived from the same enactment. Corroboration is not required in England or in civil cases in Scotland. Scots law is one of the few legal systems that require corroboration.

== Crown Office and Procurator Fiscal Service ==
The Crown Office and Procurator Fiscal Service (COPFS) provides independent public prosecution of criminal offences in Scotland (as the more recent Crown Prosecution Service does in England and Wales) and has extensive responsibilities in the investigation and prosecution of crime. The Crown Office is headed by the Lord Advocate, in whose name all prosecutions are carried out, and employs Advocates Depute (for the High Court of Justiciary) and Procurators Fiscal (for the Sheriff Courts) as public prosecutors.

Private prosecutions are very rare in Scotland and these require "Criminal Letters" from the High Court of the Justiciary. Criminal Letters are unlikely to be granted without the agreement of the Lord Advocate.

== "Not proven" verdict ==
The Scots legal system was unique in having three possible verdicts for a criminal trial: "guilty", "not guilty" and "not proven". Both "not guilty" and "not proven" result in an acquittal.

The 'not proven' verdict in modern Scots criminal law can be described as an historical accident. Historically, there were no set forms for verdicts used by early juries, and their role was simply to find the guilt or innocence of the accused. The role of the jury changed when it became customary in the Justice Court to compose lengthy indictments, where facts were listed which culminated in a statement of the punishable character of such conduct in general of which the accused ought to be punished for his commission of it. In these situations the role of the jury was to deliver one of the 'special verdicts' of "proven" or "not proven" for individual factual issues one-by-one. It was then left to the judge to pronounce upon the facts found "proven" whether this was sufficient to establish guilt of the crime charged. This practice persisted until the 1728 trial of Carnegie of Finhaven, where the jury's right to return a verdict of not guilty, and essentially pronounce on innocence and guilt, was re-established. By the 19th century, the legal profession had come to view these 'special verdicts' as obsolete, and yet the "not proven" verdict continued to be used.

The 'not proven' verdict was often taken by juries and the media as meaning "we know they did it but there is not enough proof". The verdict, especially in high-profile cases, often causes controversy. A study was commissioned in September 2017) by academics at the Universities of Glasgow and Warwick, in collaboration with Ipsos Mori, to consider, among other things, the three verdict system in Scotland in order to inform future reform of the criminal justice system in Scotland.

== List of current offences ==
=== Crimes against the person ===
- Murder
- Culpable homicide (comparable to the offence of manslaughter in English law)
- Corporate homicide (Corporate Manslaughter and Corporate Homicide Act 2007)
- Assault (can be charged in an aggravated form while still being considered to be the same offence)
- Stouthrief and hamesucken (assault while trespassing within the victim's home, in the former case as part of a burglary)
- Culpable and reckless injury
- Culpable and reckless endangering of the public
- Uttering threats (MacKellar v Dickson (1898))
- Sexual offences (see Sexual Offences (Scotland) Act 2009 and Sexual offences in Scotland)
- Stalking (Criminal Justice and Licensing (Scotland) Act 2010, s. 39)

=== Crimes of dishonesty ===
- Theft, which can be aggravated
  - Theft by housebreaking
  - Theft by opening lock-fast places ("OLP") (also, opening or attempting to open a lock-fast place with intent to steal)
- Offences under the Civic Government (Scotland) Act 1982:
  - s. 57 – Being within a premises with the intention to commit theft
  - s. 58 – convicted thief in possession of articles from which an intent to steal may be inferred
- Embezzlement (or breach of trust and embezzlement)
- Robbery
- Piracy, both at common law and under the law of nations
- Hijacking
- Fraud
- Forgery, with the requirement of uttering (i.e. use as if it was genuine), see Burke v MacPhail
- Numerous statutory frauds
- Reset (possession of stolen goods) and the related statutory offences
- Extortion
- Unsolicited goods and services, see Unsolicited Goods and Services Act 1971
- Bribery (principally of a judicial officer), see Bribery Act 2010 and the Local Government (Scotland) Act 1973
- Electoral offences under the Representation of the People Act 1983
- Stouthrief

=== Crimes against property ===
- Trespass on heritable property (Trespass (Scotland) Act 1865)
- Malicious mischief, whether riotious and wilful or intentional and reckless
- Offences under the Explosive Substances Act 1883
- Vandalism (Criminal Law (Consolidation) (Scotland) Act 1995, s.52)
- Fire-raising, whether wilful or culpable and reckless
- Cruelty to animals (Animal Health and Welfare (Scotland) Act 2006)
- Sinking and destroying a ship with intent to defraud insurers (common law). Also offences under the Aviation and Maritime Security Act 1990
- Plagium (child-stealing, considered to be an aggravated form of theft)

=== Crimes relating to public order and morality ===
- Abortion
- Mobbing (previously mobbing and rioting)
- Breach of the peace, more commonly labelled as "threatening or abusive behaviour", see Criminal Justice and Licensing (Scotland) Act 2010, s.38
- Violation of sepulchres
- Public indecency
- Indecent exposure
- Sexual exposure (Sexual Offences (Scotland) Act 2009, s.8)
- Bigamy
- Perjury
- Attempt to pervert the course of justice
- Escaping from lawful custody (Police and Fire Reform (Scotland) Act 2012, s.91)
- Contempt of court

=== Miscellaneous statutory offences ===
- Road traffic offences (see Road Traffic Act 1988, Road Traffic Regulation Act 1984, among others; the Highway Code cites legislation where it mentions offences)
- Controlled and prohibited substances (Misuse of Drugs Act 1971 and Psychoactive Substances Act 2016)
- Offences relating to alcohol licensing and licensed premises (Licensing (Scotland) Act 2005)
- Police obstruction or assault (Police and Fire Reform (Scotland) Act 2012)

== Former offences ==
- Concealment of pregnancy
- Clandestine injury to women (i.e. sex with an unconscious woman)
- Lewd, indecent or libidinous practice or behaviour
- Sodomy
- Shameless indecency
- Offences under the Forgery of Foreign Bills Act 1803 (repealed)

== Defences ==
- Diminished responsibility
- Special defence

== Significant cases ==
- Bird v HM Advocate 1952 JC 23 - case establishing the "eggshell skull" rule
- Brennan v HM Advocate 1977 JC 38 – authority against automatism in cases of voluntary intoxication
- Cadder v HM Advocate [2010] UKSC 43 – not being permitted access to a solicitor while in police custody was a breach of Article 6(1) of the European Convention on Human Rights
- Cawthorne v HM Advocate 1968 JC 32
- Crawford v HM Advocate 1950 JC 67
- Drury v HM Advocate 2001 SCCR 538 – provided modern definition of murder
- Jamieson v HM Advocate 1994 SLT 537
- Khaliq v HM Advocate 1984 JC 23
- Ross v HM Advocate 1991 JC 210 – first authoritative recognition of non-insane automatism
- Smart v HM Advocate 1975 JC 30
- Sutherland v HM Advocate 1994 SLT 634
- Moorov v HM Advocate 1930 JC 68 – admissibility of similar fact evidence – established a precedent named the Moorov doctrine

== See also ==
- Corroboration in Scots law
- English criminal law
- Lord Advocate's Reference
- Stair Memorial Encyclopaedia
- Trial by jury in Scotland
