= Option contract =

Type of contractual promise

An option contract, or simply option, is defined as "a promise which meets the requirements for the formation of a contract and limits the promisor's power to revoke an offer". Option contracts are common in relation to property (see below) and in professional sports.

An option contract is a type of contract that protects an offeree from an offeror's ability to revoke their offer to engage in a contract.

Under the common law, consideration for the option contract is required as it is still a form of contract, cf. Restatement (Second) of Contracts § 87(1). Typically, an offeree can provide consideration for the option contract by paying money for the contract or by providing value in some other form such as by rendering other performance or forbearance. Courts will generally try to find consideration if there are any grounds for doing so. See consideration for more information. The Uniform Commercial Code (UCC) has eliminated a need for consideration for firm offers between merchants in some limited circumstances.

== Introduction ==
An option is the right to convey a piece of property. The person granting the option is called the optionor (or more usually, the grantor) and the person who has the benefit of the option is called the optionee (or more usually, the beneficiary).

Because options amount to dispositions of future property, in common law countries they are normally subject to the rule against perpetuities and must be exercised within the time limits prescribed by law.

In relation to certain types of asset (principally land), in many countries an option must be registered in order to be binding on a third party.

== Application of option contract in unilateral contracts ==
The option contract provides an important role in unilateral contracts. In unilateral contracts, the promisor seeks acceptance by performance from the promisee. In this scenario, the classical contract view was that a contract was not formed until the performance that the promisor seeks was completely performed. This was because the consideration for the contract was the performance of the promisee. Once the promisee performed completely, consideration was satisfied and a contract was formed and only the promisor was bound to his promise.

A problem arose with unilateral contracts because of the late formation of the contract. With classical unilateral contracts, a promisor can revoke his offer for the contract at any point prior to the promisee's complete performance. So, if a promisee provides 99% of the performance sought, the promisor could then revoke without any remedy for the promisee. The promisor had maximum protection and the promisee had maximum risk in this scenario.

The modern view of how option contracts apply now provides some security to the promisee in the above scenario. Essentially, once a promisee begins performance, an option contract is implicitly created between the promisor and the promisee. The promisor impliedly promises not to revoke the offer and the promisee impliedly promises to furnish complete performance, but as the name suggests, the promisee still retains the "option" of not completing performance. The consideration for this option contract is discussed in comment d of the above cited section. Basically, the consideration is provided by the promisee's beginning of performance.

Case law differs from jurisdiction to jurisdiction, but an option contract can either be implicitly created instantaneously at the beginning of performance (the Restatement view) or after some "substantial performance". Cook v. Coldwell Banker/Frank Laiben Realty Co., 967 S.W.2d 654 (Mo. App. 1998). Case law in England and Wales has established that in exercising an option, a grantee "must comply strictly with the conditions for its exercise".

It has been hypothesized that option contracts could help allow free market roads to be constructed without resorting to eminent domain, as the road company could make option contracts with many landowners, and eventually consummate the purchase of parcels comprising the contiguous route needed to build the road.

== Assignability ==
It is a general principle of contract law that an offer cannot be assigned by the recipient of the offer to another party. However, an option contract can be sold (unless it provides otherwise), allowing the buyer of the option to step into the shoes of the original offeree and accept the offer to which the option pertains.

== Contract theory ==
In economics, option contracts play an important role in the field of contract theory. In particular, Oliver Hart (1995, p. 90) has shown that option contracts can mitigate the hold-up problem (an underinvestment problem that occurs when the exact level of investment cannot be contractually specified). However, there is a debate in contract theory whether option contracts are still useful when the contractual parties cannot rule out future renegotiations. As has been pointed out by Tirole (1999), this debate is at the center of the discussions about the foundations of the incomplete contracts theory. In a laboratory experiment, Hoppe and Schmitz (2011) have confirmed that non-renegotiable option contracts can indeed solve the hold-up problem. Moreover, it turns out that option contracts are still useful even when renegotiation cannot be ruled out. The latter observation can be explained by Hart and Moore’s (2008) idea that an important role of contracts is to serve as reference points.

== See also ==
- Firm offer
- Offer and acceptance
