= Murder of Jodi Jones =

2003 murder in Scotland

- Photo of Jodi Jones
- Location: Dalkeith, Midlothian, Scotland
- Date: 30 June 2003; 23 years ago
- Attack type: Child murder by stabbing and slashing
- Victims: Jodi Jones, aged 14
- Verdict: Guilty
- Convictions: Murder
- Sentence: Life imprisonment with the possibility of parole after 20 years
- Convicted: Luke Mitchell
- Criminal information

The murder of Jodi Jones is a Scottish murder case from June 2003 in which a 14-year-old schoolgirl was murdered in woodland in Dalkeith, Scotland by her 14-year-old boyfriend Luke Mitchell. She was found murdered with a knife behind a wall on a path where she would invariably meet her boyfriend, having set out to meet him that afternoon.

Mitchell, who claimed to have found her almost immediately after a search party set out that evening to find the missing girl, rapidly became the prime suspect and was brought to trial in 2004. It was discovered that a knife that he regularly carried around with him and which could have been the murder weapon had mysteriously disappeared, as had his coat which he had been seen wearing that night and which could have held incriminatory forensic evidence. The suggestion was that these had been disposed of to hide evidence. Equally suspicious had been that these items were then replaced by his mother, who denied the existence of the previous items. The pouch for the missing knife was found, and Mitchell had marked on it Jodi's initials JJ with "1989 – 2003" (her birth and death), as well as a quote saying "the finest day I ever had was when tomorrow never came".

At trial Mitchell and his mother claimed he had been at home at the time, but phone records suggested otherwise and his brother admitted (as confirmed by computer records) that he had actually been watching pornography, saying he only would have done so if no one else had been at home. As a result of this, the mother was additionally charged with perjury, although this was ultimately dropped when Mitchell was found guilty of the murder in January 2005. The brother, who originally gave a different account and admitted to having agreed with his mother what to tell police when he first spoke to police, had also initially been charged with perverting the course of justice before telling the account he had given at trial.

Mitchell continues to protest his innocence, and several attempts to overturn his conviction have failed. A large amount of discredited speculation has been made about the case, including inaccurate claims that no DNA linked Mitchell to the murder and that this indicates innocence, and the family of the victim have endured online abuse and false accusations from Mitchell's supporters. Jones' family say they have always remained satisfied of Mitchell's guilt.

== Background ==
=== Luke Mitchell ===
Luke Mitchell was born on 24 July 1988, the younger of two children. His parents separated when he was 11, and he was raised by his mother, Corinne, in relatively comfortable circumstances in Newbattle. Mitchell went to St David's RC High School in Dalkeith. About a year before the murder, Mitchell had undergone several lifestyle changes. He was originally considered a well-mannered, smartly-dressed youth whose hobbies included army cadets, riding horses, and motorbikes, but he then changed to adopt the "Goth" style of dressing. He grew his hair long and wore long black clothes, as did girlfriend Jodi Jones. Mitchell had used significant amounts of cannabis for about a year up until the murder, and by the time of the killing he was smoking it every day during or after school. He also got into trouble at school often and fought with other pupils. He was known to have told a peer that he could imagine getting "stoned" and killing someone, and once showed a fellow pupil a knife while telling them that he knew the best way to slit someone's throat.

Mitchell had developed an interest in Satanism and Marilyn Manson, and teachers said that this permeated his school work. His English teacher was so concerned with the violence and interest in Satanism that was expressed in his essays and in graffiti on his school work that she referred the matter to a guidance teacher. He had written in one essay about how he questioned God's existence and added "people like you need Satanic people like me to keep the balance", while in another wrote "just because I am more violent than others and cut myself, does that justify some pompous git of a teacher to refer me to a psychiatrist? Just because I have chosen to follow the teachings of Satan doesn't mean I need psychiatric help".

Mitchell was in the same school year as Jodi Jones. He, Jones and various other pupils used to smoke cannabis on the school premises. The two began a relationship in around February 2003, when both were 14 years old, with Mitchell being Jones's first serious boyfriend. Jones soon became smitten with Mitchell, and their relationship soon became sexual. One entry in Jones's diary dating from the spring or early summer of 2003 reads: "'I think I am actually in love with Luke. Not in a stupid way, I mean real love. God, I think I would die if he finished with me ... If I am crying, he hugs me and strokes my face. He is just so sweet. No matter what he says I believe him." However, unbeknown to Jones, Mitchell was actually also in a secretive relationship with another young woman. This girl believed that she was Mitchell's girlfriend at the time of the murder, only finding out he had been cheating on her when she heard in the news of Jones' death and how Jones was Mitchell's girlfriend.

Mitchell was also known to have a close and unusually physical relationship with his mother, sharing a bedroom with her.

=== Jodi Jones ===
Jodi Jones was born in 1989 in Easthouses, the youngest of three children born to James and Judy Jones. She was born into a working class family, with both of her parents working for the Royal Mail. Jones has been described as a bright, "level-headed" and headstrong child who displayed a flair for painting and poetry and who was particularly close with her older sister, Janine. She was affectionately known by her mother as her "wee mentor".

In 1998, Jones's father took his own life. His death caused great distress to the family and Jones's mother gave up her work in order to care for her three children. Jones's older sister briefly relocated to Mayfield to live with her grandmother to distance herself from the trauma, but soon returned to her family home.

As a teenager, Jones developed a streak of rebellion; she is known to have frequently adjusted her image and to have alternately dyed her hair colours such as pink or green, to have developed an interest in heavy metal bands such as Metallica and, by age 14, to have experimented with marijuana and alcohol. When she entered into a relationship with Mitchell, she initially kept the relationship a secret from her family, confiding only in her sister, Janine. Shortly thereafter, Janine (then 19) informed her mother of her younger sister's boyfriend. In May 2003, Mitchell met the Jones family for the first time.

It was known that Jones often self-harmed.

Jones and Mitchell frequently met via one traversing through a stretch of woodland to meet the other. A section of this woodland is known as Roan's Dyke Path.

In the weeks immediately before she was murdered, Jones's social life—which largely revolved around Mitchell—was curtailed by her mother after she discovered her daughter had begun taking drugs. The restriction on her meeting her boyfriend was lifted on 30 June, the day of the murder.

== Discovery ==
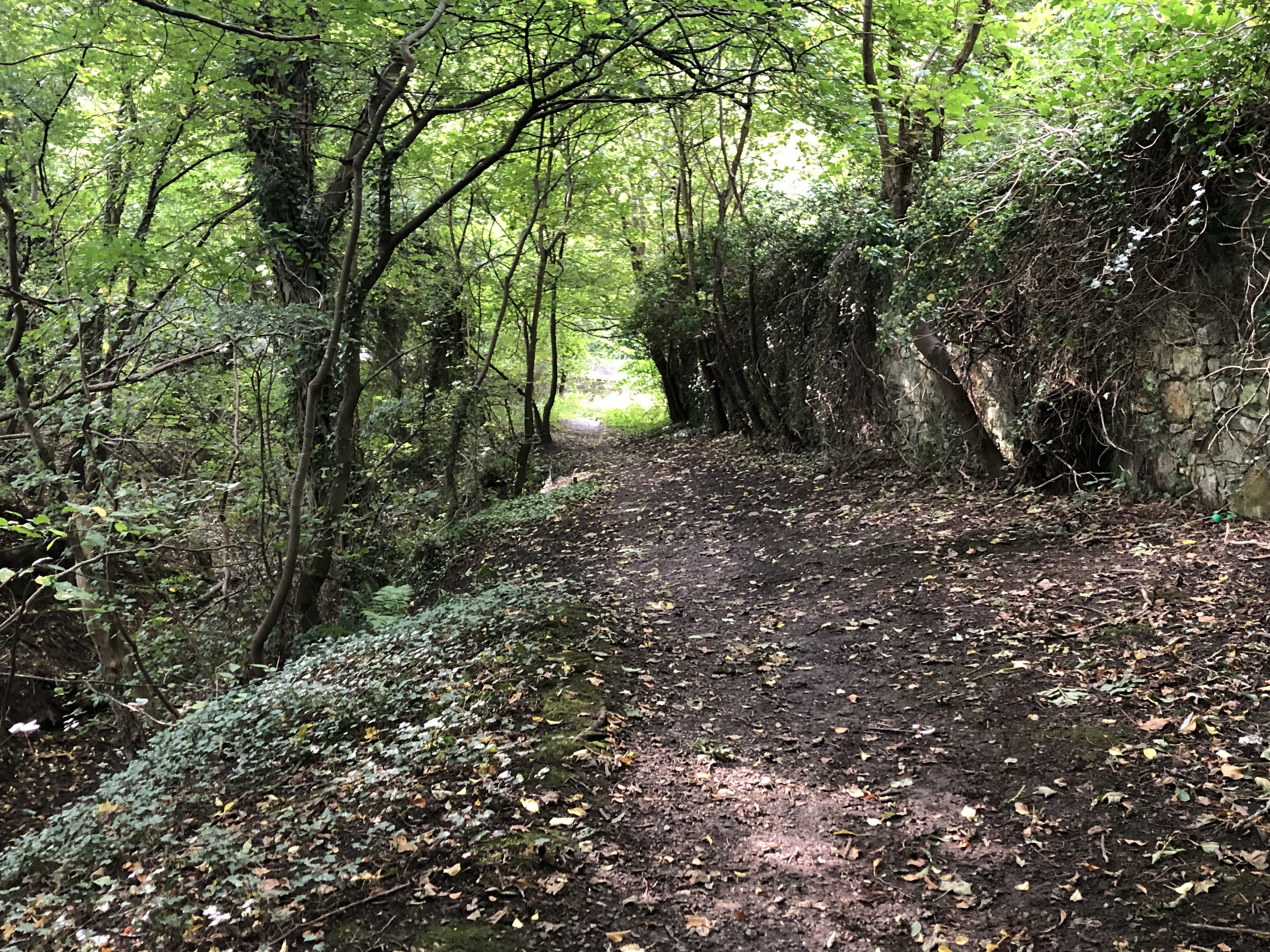
The end of Roan's Dyke Path, next to which the body of Jones was found. When a search party was sent out to find Jones, Mitchell led the party straight to a gap in the wall on the right of the image, and after climbing over said he had found her body. The ease in which he found the body was later used at court to suggest guilt.

At about 5 pm on 30 June 2003, Jones left her home, informing her family she was going to see Mitchell. Her body was found several hours later on the route she invariably took to meet her boyfriend; she had been bound and murdered. Jones had already texted Mitchell before leaving and he was known to have been aware that she was on her way to meet him, as a relative of Jones had told him so on the phone.

Jones's body was located in a wooded area behind a high wall along Roan's Dyke Path. As the murder trial opened at the High Court in Edinburgh yesterday, it was claimed that Luke Mitchell repeatedly struck Jodi on the head and body, strangled her until she collapsed and then tied her arms together and cut her throat with a knife.

He then stabbed her over and over again, with what is believed to have been a knife, on her face, ears, mouth, breast and abdomen. His frenzied assault, between 5pm and 5.45pm, continued even after she was dead, it is claimed. . Mitchell claimed to find the body, and the ease in which he was able to find it was later used in court to suggest guilt. A search party had been arranged at around 10pm by the family of Jodi Jones, and when Mitchell met up with them he went straight to a gap in the wall bordering Roan Dyke's Path, climbed through it and immediately found the body of the deceased at around 10.30 pm, suggesting that he knew the body was there all along. It had also been noted how Mitchell did not appear to show any emotion or surprise when finding the body, whilst the other members of the search party were hysterical and upset at the finding. Mitchell claimed that his dog, which was being trained to track, had stopped at the V-shaped notch where Mitchell climbed through. However, this account was disputed by other members of the search party, who said that he went straight to the V-shaped notch without being notified or led there by the dog at all.

Reports upon the discovery of the body said that it indicated that the killer was likely to have been in a "disturbed and extremely angry state". Police said that Jones had died from "a vicious and frenzied attack involving a knife or a similar weapon". Forensic psychologist Ian Stephen advised that the attack indicated "an eruption of anger", adding:

"It sounds like an argument has taken place, either someone who was extremely upset has come across Jodi or someone was there with her and there has been a violent dispute. The severity of the killing suggests the motive may have been more personal, but whoever carried this out was angry, upset and disturbed. At the time of the attack the person would have been frenzied and very worked up - they would not have been in control, would have completely lost control. With its frenzied nature it could easily be a spur of the moment reaction, an eruption of anger."

Police said that the site of the attack indicated that the person responsible likely had local knowledge, and that they were "likely to be in their teens or 20s". Within ten days of the murder investigation, 1,400 people had been spoken to, 250 homes and businesses had been visited, 570 people had been spoken to in door-to-door inquiries and 839 motorists had been stopped.

The injuries sustained by Jones closely resembled those of actress Elizabeth Short, who was murdered in 1947 and was popularly referred to by media as the Black Dahlia. The initials LM and JJ had been carved into a tree near the crime scene. The Jones family made it known that Mitchell was not welcome at the funeral.

=== Suspicion falls on Mitchell ===
School authorities cited concern about Mitchell's safety in unsuccessfully attempting to prevent his return to school; two months after the murder he was suspended after objecting to being separated from other pupils.

After the discovery of the body, Mitchell was initially questioned as a witness; he quickly became the main focus of the investigation. Ten months later he was arrested and charged with the crime. He was also charged with the possession of a knife or knives in public places, including St David's High School, and of supplying cannabis. Police were later criticised for infringing his human rights by questioning him without a solicitor present, although it was also ruled that this interview had not affected the key prosecution evidence.

Suspicion was also focused on Mitchell due to his taste in music and his alleged fascination with Satanism. He had an interest in Marilyn Manson. On his school books were found messages written such as "Satan master, lead us into HELL" and "I offer my flesh, blood and soul to the dark lord of hell!", as well as references to Manson. Mitchell's schoolbooks that had such phrases written all over their covers were photographed and shown in the press.

During a search of his home, detectives found 20 bottles of urine in his bedroom and confiscated a copy of The Golden Age of Grotesque by Marilyn Manson containing the short film Doppelherz. It was purchased two days after Jones's death, and Mitchell was known to have subsequently watched it. A ten-minute excerpt from the film, as well as several paintings by Manson depicting the Black Dahlia's mutilated body, were presented as evidence during the trial. The film included images of apparently naked women being tied together and abducted. Manson had a "Golden Age of the Grotesque" exhibition on his website at the time, featuring images depicting the mutilation and murdering of actress Elizabeth Short in the Black Dahlia case.

== Trial ==
At his trial at the High Court of Justiciary in Edinburgh, Mitchell pleaded not guilty and lodged a special defence of alibi: that he was at home cooking dinner at the time of the murder. He did not testify.

=== Prosecution case ===
A key piece of evidence against Mitchell was the fact that a knife that he was known to regularly carry had suddenly gone missing after the murder, the suggestion being that this was the missing murder weapon. Although the knife couldn't be found, the pouch for it was found in Mitchell's home, and Mitchell had marked on it Jodi's initials JJ with "1989 – 2003" (Jodi's birth and death) and "The finest day I ever had was when tomorrow never came". The latter was a quote from the lead singer of Nirvana, the favourite band of victim Jones. The prosecution said that he had carved the initials into the pouch after the murder, showing he must have disposed of the knife after the killing had occurred. Another piece of evidence was the suspicious disappearance of a camouflaged coat that Mitchell had been seen regularly wearing by a number of witnesses, and on the night of the murder itself. Police could not find the jacket and witnesses such as the family's neighbour came forward to describe how they had seen Luke's mother burning things in the garden on the night of the death, potentially meaning that it was burned that night to destroy evidence. Mitchell's mother Corinne responded by claiming that she may have been burning pampas grass. The mother had then bought Luke a new coat identical to the previous one and denied the existence of his previous one. Mitchell's knife was also mysteriously replaced by his mother five months after the murder, as a Christmas present. Additionally, Mitchell failed to provide any explanation when asked for the disappearance of the coat and knife. He had been seen by witnesses returning home on the night of the murder at around 10pm, just before he set off to join the search party, and the suggestion was that he was returning from having disposed of the knife. 10pm was also the approximate time when neighbours said that smoke and an unusual smell was emanating from the Mitchell home's garden and there was evidence Mitchell's mother had been using the log burner at that point.

Mitchell was seen as having "guilty knowledge"; in finding the body, the prosecution said he had demonstrated that he already knew where it was. The prosecution cited the accounts of the other members of the search party in describing how Mitchell had taken them straight to the V-shaped gap in the wall as the search party walked along the path, then immediately looked left to where the body was when he climbed over it and apparently knew to explore in that direction, suggesting he knew the body was there. This was further indicated, it was contended, by the fact that he was able to identify the body immediately even in the darkness and in relatively thick woodland, and also as he was able to identify the type of tree Jones was found by in later police interviews even though she was found in darkness. A witness claimed to have seen two people resembling Mitchell and Jones at the Easthouses end of the path around 4.50pm with another two witnesses claiming to see Mitchell at the Newbattle end 50 minutes later. The latter two witnesses said that it appeared he had been "up to no good".

A woman testified that she had seen someone resembling Mitchell near the murder scene. The male was wearing a khaki green, hip-length, fishing-style jacket; this matched the type of coat Mitchell was known to have owned and was seen wearing on the night of the murder by witnesses, and which mysteriously disappeared after the killing. Police also discovered from phone records that Mitchell had made a call to the speaking clock service at 4:54pm. This was deemed significant since it appeared to challenge Mitchell's claimed alibi of being at home, since he would have simply been able to tell the time from a clock on the wall had he been in his house, suggesting that he was lying and instead on his way to meet Jodi at their agreed time of 5pm. Mitchell could not provide an answer for why he had made the call when questioned about it.

When asked in police interviews about why he hadn't contacted Jodi when she would have failed to meet up with him as arranged, detectives say Mitchell responded by claiming that he thought Jodi had met somebody else and had gone off with them. The prosecution challenged this, alluding to the fact that "these two youngsters had met up every night, if they could, and she had only once before failed to keep an arrangement". Along with this, the prosecution called attention to other contradictory claims Mitchell made in his police interviews, such as claiming he had assumed Jodi hadn't turned up as she'd been grounded, when he had already been told by phone by Jones' relative that she was on her way to meet him. The tree found near the murder scene with Mitchell's initials 'LM' and victim Jodi's 'JJ' was also presented as evidence at the trial.

Mitchell's brother testified that he had been viewing internet pornography in the house at the time Mitchell said he had been there; under cross-examination Mitchell's brother said he would only have done this if he thought the house to be otherwise empty, and also said that he had not seen Mitchell in the house that afternoon, thereby discrediting Mitchell's claimed alibi of being in the family home at the time of the murder. The fact that he had been viewing porn was confirmed by computer records. The brother, who had originally supported Mitchell's alibi by claiming to police in a statement that he'd seen him in the kitchen at the time of the murder, also then revealed on the stand that he had actually discussed with his mother what to tell police in the days after the murder, and that in fact his original statement was not accurate. He also admitted on oath to having gone over the details of what to say with his mother before he spoke to the police on the second occasion, when he changed the time that he said he arrived home. The brother admitted to changing his statements. Previously, the brother had been charged with perverting the course of justice before finally giving the incriminating account for the first time at trial. As a result of this testimony at trial, Mitchell's mother Corinne (who herself had conflictingly claimed that her son was at home cooking dinner at the time of the murder) was then charged with perjury for lying to provide him with an alibi. This perjury charge was later dropped when Mitchell was found guilty. The prosecution also attempted to discredit Corinne as a witness by alluding to how she had been present at Mitchell getting a tattoo of a skull with flames in October 2003, and had lied to the staff to claim he was 18 and boasted "that's really him". The prosecution alleged that this demonstrated an unhealthy relationship between Mitchell and his mother and that she was pampering him and lying for him, and that from this the jury could consider her alibi for her own son to be untrustworthy. When giving evidence about this, a number of contradictions were exposed in the mother's account with reference to independent witnesses from the tattoo parlour.

Whilst one of the witnesses couldn't be certain that the persons they had seen were Mitchell and Jones, the sighting was still deemed notable as it specifically came at the time when Jones and Mitchell had agreed to meet and at the location they usually met. The sighting was also made at what was a regular rendezvous point for the pair. This meant that the sighting did not stand alone and added credence to it as it fitted with the circumstances that Jodi had left home to meet Mitchell, and it was made at a place where such meeting would likely have occurred. This made it more likely that the sighting was indeed of the pair.

Also considered at trial was the fact that Mitchell had suspiciously mentioned when questioned seeing a distinctive hair fastening on Jones' body, when this had not in fact been readily visible. It was also heard how Mitchell had plans to go away for a fortnight with his other girlfriend, who did not know that Mitchell had been cheating on her for Jones, only days after the murder. The suggestion was that the revelation of the affair could have been a source of conflict between Jones and Mitchell on the afternoon of the murder. Mitchell apparently lied in interviews by saying he hadn't spoken to the other girl for months, when phone records showed he regularly rang her, including for some hours after he had had sex with Jones for the last time two days before her murder. Additionally, the prosecution outlined that Mitchell had made a suspicious comment to a witness on the evening of the murder that Jones would not be coming out that evening, even though Mitchell had earlier been told by Jones' family that Jodi had set off to meet him. The Crown argued that he made this comment as he knew she was already dead.

The prosecution also believed Mitchell had taken an interest in the Black Dahlia case. It was also heard how he liked horror films and occasionally read porn magazines. It was additionally stated, and confirmed by Mitchell, that his cannabis use had escalated after the murder, to a level Mitchell himself estimated to be around 600 joints a week. A detective giving evidence at the trial said that he had never heard of anyone using such large amounts of cannabis in his 19 years as a police officer. Schoolfriends told the court that they had seen both Mitchell and Jones smoke cannabis at lunchtime on the day of the murder. Mitchell's mother agreed at court that her son had a short temper and said that he had told a doctor that he had a short fuse.

=== Defence arguments ===
No genetic material from Mitchell, which could not be "innocently explained", was found on her body. Mitchell's DNA was actually found on her bra, and Jodi's DNA was found on Mitchell's trousers (although this could have occurred through an "innocent transfer"), but in an agreement between the Crown and Mitchell's defence team the issue of DNA was decided to be made irrelevant to the trial, as the pair were in an intimate relationship anyway. As part of the deal, neither the prosecution or defence were going to use DNA for their case. One hundred and twenty-two items were taken from the murder scene from which attempts to obtain DNA profiles proved unsuccessful. No forensic evidence was recovered from the incinerator. Mitchell was the subject of intense press coverage before his trial.

In response to the prosecution accusation that only prior knowledge could have explained the way Mitchell was able to discover the body lying in an area behind a wall, lawyers for Mitchell said he had been aided by his dog. To allow the jury to explore the plausibility of these claims, a mock-up wall was erected in the Laigh Hall, below Parliament Hall within Parliament House, where the trial was being heard. A visit by the jury to the murder scene was also arranged.

=== Verdict and sentence ===
On 20 January 2005, the jury began their deliberations; these deliberations concluded the following day. On 21 January, the jury found Mitchell guilty by a majority verdict of Jones's murder after a total of five hours of deliberation. He was also found guilty of supplying cannabis. Mitchell showed no emotion upon the announcement of the verdicts. The trial had taken 42 days, a record at the time for a single person upon trial in Scotland.

Upon receipt of the jury's verdict, Judge Lord Nimmo Smith informed Mitchell: "It lies beyond any skill of mine to look into the black depths of your mind; I can only look at what you have done. You have been convicted of a truly evil murder—one of the most appalling crimes that any of us can remember—and you will rightly be regarded as wicked." The trial judge opined that Mitchell's use of significant amounts of cannabis in the lead-up to the murder had blurred his understanding of fantasy and reality. Mitchell's sentencing was delayed in order for the minimum term he should serve before being considered for release could be determined. On 11 February 2005, Judge Smith informed Mitchell that he would spend a minimum of 20 years in prison before being considered for parole.

He observed that Mitchell's relationship with another girl may have been a factor in him killing Jones, saying to Mitchell: "I do not know how far in advance you decided to kill Jodi. A trigger for deciding to do it then may have been her discovery that you were also carrying on a relationship with Kimberley Thomson and had planned to see her on holiday". He also commented on Mitchell's lack of emotion during the trial, saying "it may be that a lack of emotional response made you more readily able to inflict harm on others".

Marilyn Manson spoke out to disagree with claims that his work had influenced Mitchell, instead blaming Mitchell's lifestyle, saying it was "all about" his upbringing.

=== Confirmed version of events ===
The events of the murder as determined at trial and by the forensic evidence show that the attack on Jones would have started with Mitchell punching her in the face several times and then attempting to strangle her with his hands. This would have led to her falling to her knees, at which point the evidence suggests he began to use the knife, severing a major artery in her neck, which ultimately caused her death. Her neck was then slashed another twenty times and then her clothes were removed, with her trousers used to bind her body, at which point he would have stabbed her abdomen, breast and mouth, and slit her eyelids.

== Appeals ==
In March 2006, Mitchell was granted leave to appeal against his conviction (and his length of sentence) at the High Court of Justiciary sitting as the Court of Criminal Appeal in Edinburgh, on the grounds that the trial judge should have moved the trial outside the city. The prosecution countered that Mitchell's defence team had contradicted themselves by simultaneously claiming that there had been intense press coverage nationally and not just confined to Edinburgh, yet had stated that moving the trial out of Edinburgh would have stopped the possibility of an unfair trial. The Court of Criminal Appeal in Edinburgh heard Mitchell's appeal in February 2008, and in May 2008 his original conviction was upheld by Lord Osborne, Lord Kingarth and Lord Hamilton. They ruled that there was sufficient evidence in law that Mitchell could be convicted on and rejected his other grounds of appeal, although they stated that the way police had questioned Mitchell on 14 August 2003 had been "outrageous" and was "to be deplored." However, they concluded that none of the key pieces of evidence of the Crown were affected by the conduct of this interview. Commenting after the rejecting of all six of the grounds of appeal, Lord Hamilton said:

"The absence of any signs of struggle on the path side of the wall which ran along the northern side of the Roan's Dyke Path suggests that, if Jodi Jones went through the break in the wall close to where she met her death with someone, she did so with someone she knew — such as the appellant, whom she had gone expressly to meet that evening".

Also at the 2008 appeal it was contemplated by the Crown that the reason for Mitchell attacking Jones could have been to do with Mitchell having been having the affair with the other girlfriend, who was unaware that Mitchell had been cheating on her. As heard at the 2004 trial, Mitchell had been planning to go away for two weeks with the other girlfriend days after the murder, and the Crown argued at the appeal: "it offers a possible explanation for conflict with Jodi at the time. If he was going to disappear to Kenmore to visit a girl Jodi didn't know anything about, the potential for conflict was there". Mitchell had lied to police during the investigation, telling them that he hadn't spoken to this other girlfriend for months before the murder, when phone records had shown they had called each other 79 times in the weeks and months before the murder.

The defence had requested to the public at the start of the first appeal for any witnesses who could prove Mitchell innocent to come forward, but none did.

On 2 February 2011, Mitchell's appeal against sentence was refused by a two to one majority. Lord Justice Clerk, Lord Gill, sitting with Lord Hardie and Lady Cosgrove, stated that he had the utmost sympathy for the family of the victim and that he understood entirely why this murder should have caused such public revulsion. Nevertheless, he was of the opinion that the sentencing judge should not have imposed a punishment part of the sentence of such severity on such a young offender. He stated that justice would be done in this case if the punishment part were fixed at 15 years. He did not consider that they were precluded from that disposal by anything said in the guidance given in HM Adv v Boyle and Ors (supra). He regretted, therefore, that he had to differ from his Lordship and her Ladyship.

=== Cadder appeal refused ===
On 15 April 2011, Mitchell's bid to challenge his conviction for murder following a human rights ruling by the Supreme Court in the Cadder case was rejected. His lawyer told the Appeal Court in Edinburgh that his trial was unfair because he had no access to a lawyer during an interview. Lord Osborne sitting with Lord Hamilton (Lord Justice General) and Lord Kingarth told Mitchell that the application for leave to lodge the additional ground was refused. The appellant's appeal against sentence was finally disposed of on 2 February 2011 and in such circumstances there did not exist a live appeal in respect of which leave could be granted under section 110(4).

In November 2011, Mitchell was refused leave to take his appeal to the Supreme Court of the United Kingdom, on the basis that his previous appeal had been dealt with before the Cadder ruling and could therefore not be re-opened.

=== SCCRC ===
On 20 July 2012, lawyers acting for Mitchell launched a fresh bid to have his conviction overturned when a 300-page dossier was delivered to the Scottish Criminal Cases Review Commission (SCCRC). The dossier included claims that a Mitchell lookalike may have confused eyewitnesses. The lawyers donated their services free of charge.

In July 2014, the SCCRC ruled that police officers breached Luke Mitchell's human rights when they questioned him over the murder of Jones, but determined he was not the victim of a miscarriage of justice. The SCCRC report stated that, despite Mitchell's claims that he was innocent, there are no grounds to challenge the guilty verdict. Immediately after the decision by the SCCRC, it was announced that Mitchell would take his case to the European Courts; the competency of such a move was questionable since the ECHR has a strict six-month deadline for applications. In 2017, Mitchell was reported to be working on another appeal.

In 2019, GoFundMe deleted an appeal to raise funds for Mitchell led by alternative-therapist Sandra Lean, saying it breached their terms of service. Lean had also led the failed 2014 appeal bid. Lean has been criticised by the family of Jones for spreading "misinformation" about the case and for selling campaign T-shirts with slogans on them such as "open your eyes to the lies" and "justice for Jodi and Luke".

== Aftermath ==
=== Discrediting of speculation on the case ===
There was some speculation that a used condom found near Jones' body could have suggested an alternative suspect. However, victim Jodi Jones was not sexually assaulted in any way, and though Mitchell's defence team claimed they knew the identity of the man the condom belonged to, in 2008 they dropped any claims about the man. The man had already been ruled out of any involvement by the police investigation.

There have been claims that no DNA or forensic evidence "whatsoever" was found to connect Mitchell to the murder and that this indicates his innocence, though these claims have been disproved by his DNA having been actually found on Jones' bra and hers on his trousers. Defence and prosecution agreed not to make DNA part of the case, as the pair were in a relationship and each's DNA would be expected to be found on the other, and it was agreed not to indicate either innocence or guilt. Mitchell's coat, which may have held incriminatory evidence of a struggle, had also apparently been destroyed, meaning that this possibility could not be examined. At the time of the investigation, 122 items were taken from the murder scene and analysed to attempt to obtain DNA profiles, but none were found. The fact that no DNA at all has been found that implicates anyone other than Mitchell has actually helped eliminate other potential suspects (such as Mark Kane), not help exonerate Mitchell. When a forensic scientist gave evidence at the trial, he also said that there was no evidence that the attacker would have been bloodstained after the attack.

A Freedom of Information request was sent to Police Scotland in response to media claims that a knife found at a farm in Newtongrange in 2003 had not been forensically tested, but Police Scotland confirmed it had been.

After the airing of a 2021 Channel 5 documentary about the case titled Murder in a Small Town which speculated that Mitchell was innocent, a number of criticisms were levelled at its selectiveness. Mitchell's mother Corinne was shown continuing to claim that Mitchell was at home cooking at the time of the murder, but the programme was noted to have failed to mention how his brother had contradicted this at the trial. Criticisms were also made of the fact that the programme had failed to mention how Mitchell had made the call to the speaking clock at 4:54pm that afternoon when he was supposedly at home, apparently disproving his claimed alibi, and also how Mitchell could offer no explanation of this.

The 2021 documentary also implied that members of Jones' own family were involved in a cover-up, to which the family responded with severe criticism, and its showing led to people attacking one of the family members on social media and suggesting they were involved. In response it has been confirmed that the police checking the whereabouts of all family members is routine in helping developing a timeline of what happened and is routine in all murder investigations, and that no other family members were ever considered suspects.

In April 2023, the family of Jones criticised continuing claims from Mitchell's supporters that he was innocent, with one relative saying: "These supporters are dangerously deluded. The family has always been of the view the police have the correct person for Jodi's murder... his team are just muddying the waters and confusing people with no knowledge of the legal system and how it works". The family of Jones have been subjected to a number of false accusations on social media, as well as regular abuse from "amateur sleuths" and supporters of Mitchell, which they have described as "soul-destroying".

=== Imprisonment of Mitchell ===
In June 2023, it was revealed that Mitchell had failed two random drugs tests while imprisoned at HM Prison Greenock. He had been moved to Chrisswell House in Greenock Prison in 2021 in preparation for progression to an open prison, but after failing the tests plans to allow him community visits were shelved, and his supporters claimed he could as a result face at least three more years in prison before parole is considered. A relative of Jones said: "It is everyone else's fault he has served a life sentence. They keep saying it's justice for Jodi, too. It is offensive to us they are using her name to try and free him. He takes illegal drugs but somehow that's the prison's fault?".

== Television programmes ==
In May 2007, a BBC Scotland Frontline Scotland documentary examined a theory that the murder might have been committed by a student who was alleged to have handed in an essay about killing a girl in the woods a few weeks before the murder and who allegedly had scratches on his face. The documentary also challenged the theory that Mitchell was an obsessive Marilyn Manson fan and had a keen interest in the Black Dahlia murder, stating that there is no evidence that Mitchell knew of the Dahlia case until after the murder. Professor Anthony Busuttil pointed out dissimilarities between the injuries to Jodi Jones and those to the Black Dahlia victim Elizabeth Short. However, the alleged suspect was actually cleared of any involvement by police and the lecturer to which the essay was supposedly handed confirmed in a police statement that no such essay had been written. It was also discovered that the friend who had claimed the existence of the essay had told the suspect to play along "and we will get £50,000 from the newspapers". His DNA had also been checked against every item in the murder investigation and no connection had been found. Professor Busuttil had in fact also given evidence at trial that there were "major similarities" between the Black Dahlia and Jones cases, such as the locations and the injuries inflicted.

In 2021, Channel 5 aired Murder in a Small Town, which raised the possibility that five other suspects could have been the murderer. The show, which was watched by 1.5 million people, was the subject of complaints to Ofcom, including one from a witness in the trial. Jones's family objected to the implication in the show that they were part of a cover-up. Tom Wood, who was second in command of Lothian and Borders Police at the time of the murder, called the programme "very one-sided" and pointed out that Mitchell's appeals had been unsuccessful. The "investigation" carried out in the programme was also widely criticised. Most of the people the documentary alleged could be alternative suspects were in fact questioned extensively and ruled out by police in the investigation.

In 2022, BBC Scotland aired an episode of The Trials That Shocked Scotland which focused on the case.

== See also ==
- Age of criminal responsibility
- List of solved missing person cases (2000s)

== Cited works and further reading ==
- Davis, Carol Ann (2014). Children Who Kill: Profiles of Pre-Teen and Teenage Killers. London: Allison & Busby Ltd. ISBN 978-0-749-01623-4.
- Kocsis, Richard N. (2008). Serial Murder and the Psychology of Violent Crimes. Sydney: Humana Press. pp. 64–65. ISBN 978-1-588-29685-6.
- Lean, Dr. Sandra (2018). Innocents Betrayed: A True Story of Justice Abandoned. Malaysia: NGU Books. ISBN 978-1-999-61710-3.
- Marrison, James (2010). The World's Most Bizarre Murders. London: John Blake Publishing. ISBN 978-1-843-58698-2.
