= Moorov v HM Advocate =

1930 case in Scots criminal law

Moorov v His Majesty's Advocate
- Court: High Court of Justiciary
- Decided: 18 July 1930
- Citation: [1930] ScotHC HCJAC_1, 1930 JC 68, 1930 SLT 596

Court membership
- Judges sitting: Lord Justice-General (Lord Clyde), Lord Justice-Clerk (Lord Alness), Lord Ormidale, Lord Anderson, Lord Sands, Lord Blackburn, and Lord Morison

Keywords
- admissibility, Similar fact evidence

Moorov v His Majesty's Advocate 1930 JC 68 is a Scots criminal and evidence law case that concerns admissibility of similar fact evidence. The High Court of Justiciary established the Moorov doctrine in its judgment, which is predominantly used in criminal prosecutions involving allegations of rape and sexual abuse.

The doctrine states that the prosecution of two or more separate offences, each witnessed by only one person, can be grouped together to evidence the accused's pattern of behaviour to the court and the jury.

== Case ==
Samuel Moorov was a draper and the proprietor of Samuel Moorov & Son on Argyle Street, Glasgow. In 1930, he was accused of committing 21 charges of assault and sexual assault against 19 of his female employees. In most of these instances, the only evidence available was the direct evidence provided by the victim.

For anyone to be convicted, Scots criminal law uniquely requires corroboration, that is, all crucial facts must be supported by at least two independent sources of evidence. Moorov could not be convicted for instances where the only evidence was the testimony by the victim. The prosecutors attempted to introduce "similar fact evidence", arguing that because several victims had testified similar assaults by Moorov, their testimonies could corroborate one another.

At the trial stage, the use of similar fact evidence was upheld and Moorov was convicted of seven assaults and nine indecent assaults against his female employees between 1923 and 1930. The court reasoned that Moorov had shown a certain course of conduct, which was sufficient to be used to corroborate his repeated, similar offences over the course of a short period.

On appeal, the Appeal Court upheld the use of testimonies from victims to corroborate offences against one another, noting that there was sufficient connection between the circumstances.

== Moorov doctrine ==
The Appeal Court's decision in Moorov is recognised as the Moorov doctrine in Scots criminal and evidence law. The doctrine allows the evidence of a witness to one crime to corroborate the evidence of another witness to a second crime. The doctrine applies only if the two crimes are connected in time, character, and circumstance so that they may be considered to be part of a single course of conduct. The two charges must relate to crimes that are of the same character. The period between the two crimes usually cannot be more than three years. However, the doctrine has been used for longer periods.

Although predominantly used in rape and sexual assault cases, the doctrine is not restricted to sexual offences. In 1951, Lord Carmont used the doctrine in a case where the accused had allegedly committed several distinct assaults with a shaving razors. Soon thereafter, in 1952, Joseph McCudden, a former Scots Guard and a baker from Blantyre was charged with two charges of bribing two footballers to "throw a game". He was convicted on trial and on appeal, Lord Justice General Cooper, held that the trial court had correctly used the Moorov doctrine, as the two charges were closely connected.

A court may only apply the evidence from a "greater" charge to corroborate that of a "lesser" charge, and not vice versa. For example, evidence for an indecent exposure charge cannot corroborate a rape charge. But evidence for rape may corroborate indecent exposure.

== See also ==
- Pre-trial rights of the accused in Scots law
