= Corpus delicti =

Conviction requires proof of a crime

In Western law, corpus delicti (Latin for 'body of the crime'; pl. corpora delicti), is the principle that a crime must be proven to have occurred before a person could be convicted of having committed that crime.

For example, a person cannot be tried for larceny unless it can be proven that property has been stolen. Likewise in order for a person to be tried for arson, it must be proven that a criminal act resulted in the burning of a property. Black's Law Dictionary (6th ed.) defines "corpus delicti" as: "the fact of a crime having been actually committed".

In common law systems, the concept has its outgrowth in several principles. Many jurisdictions hold as a legal rule that a defendant's out-of-court confession alone is insufficient evidence to prove the defendant's guilt beyond reasonable doubt. A corollary to this rule is that an accused cannot be convicted solely upon the testimony of an accomplice. Some jurisdictions also hold that without first showing independent corroboration that a crime has occurred, the prosecution may not introduce evidence of the defendant's statement.

== Requirements ==
In general, all corpus delicti requires at a minimum:

1. The occurrence of the specific injury; and
2. some criminal act as the source of the injury.

For example:

- Homicide: 1) An individual has died 2) as a result of action (or inaction) by another person.
- Larceny: 1) Property is missing 2) because it was stolen.

In essence corpus delicti of crimes refers to evidence that a violation of law occurred; no literal 'body' is needed.

== Murder cases ==
When a person disappears and cannot be contacted, many police agencies initiate a missing person case. If, during the course of the investigation, detectives believe that they have been murdered, then a "body" of evidentiary items, including physical, demonstrative and testimonial evidence, must be obtained to establish that the missing person has indeed died, and that their death was by homicide, before a suspect can be charged with murder. The clearest evidence in these cases is the physical body of the deceased. However, in the event that a body is not present or has not yet been discovered, it is possible to prove a crime took place if sufficient circumstantial evidence is presented to prove the matter beyond a reasonable doubt. For example, the presence at a missing person's home of spilled human blood, identifiable as that person's, in sufficient quantity to indicate exsanguination, demonstrates—even in the absence of a corpse—that the possibility that no crime has occurred, and the missing person is merely missing, is not reasonably credible.

== See also ==
- Corroboration in Scots law
- Element (criminal law)
- Murder conviction without a body
