= Mirror image rule =

Term in contract law

In the law of contracts, the mirror image rule, also referred to as an unequivocal and absolute acceptance requirement, states that an offer must be accepted exactly with no modifications. The offeror is the master of his own offer. An attempt to accept the offer on different terms instead creates a counter-offer, and this constitutes a rejection of the original offer.

== England ==
The English common law established the concepts of consensus ad idem, offer, acceptance and counter-offer. The leading case on counter-offer is Hyde v Wrench [1840]. The phrase "Mirror-Image Rule" is rarely (if at all) used by English lawyers; but the concept remains valid, as in Gibson v Manchester City Council [1979], and Butler Machine Tool v Excello.

== Australia ==
This position is adhered to in Australia (New South Wales). If a person were to accept an offer, but make a modification, then they are actually rejecting the offer presented to them and are proposing a counter-offer: Masters v Cameron (1954) 91 CLR 353. That modifying party is then the one making a new offer, and the original offeror is now the one who has to accept.

== United States ==
In the United States, this rule still exists at common law. However, the Uniform Commercial Code ("UCC") dispenses with it in § 2-207 (but it can also be argued that § 2-207(1) enforces the mirror image rule). Therefore, its applicability depends upon what law governs. Most states have adopted the UCC, which governs transactions in goods. Contracts for services or land, for example, would not be governed by the UCC.

The second Restatement of Contracts also provides that when parties have not agreed to an essential term, "a term which is reasonable in the circumstances is supplied by the court." However, it may not be possible for a reasonable term to be supplied by the court.
