= Doctrine of chances (disambiguation) =

The term doctrine of chances is any of several things:

- The doctrine of chances, a rule of evidence in law
- The Doctrine of Chances, the first textbook on the mathematical theory of probability, published in 1718;
- The theory of probability, in 18th-century English, occurring in an influential posthumously published paper of the Reverend Thomas Bayes, "An Essay Towards Solving a Problem in the Doctrine of Chances.
