= Precognition (Scots law) =

Taking witness statements before a trial

Precognition in Scots law is the practice of precognoscing a witness, that is the taking of a factual statement from witnesses by both prosecution and defence after indictment or claim but before trial. This is often undertaken by trainee lawyers or precognition officers employed by firms; anecdotal evidence suggests many of these are former police officers.

This procedure is followed in both civil and criminal causes. The subsequent statement is generally inadmissible as evidence in the trial, but it allows the procurator fiscal, advocate or solicitor in Scotland to appear before the Courts of Scotland knowing what evidence each witness is likely to present. Following the judgement of the Appeal Court in Beurskens v HM Advocate [2014] HCJAC 99 it is possible for a precognition to be considered as a statement, and thus be admissible as evidence in court.

Historically precognitions were not only a distinctive feature of Scottish criminal procedure, but vital to the defence. Before the passage of the Criminal Justice and Licensing (Scotland) Act 2010 there was limited disclosure by the prosecution to the defence. Section 121 of 2010 Act required the prosecutor to disclose all information that would "materially weaken or undermine the evidence... by the prosecution", "materially strengthen the accused's case", or "form part of the evidence to be by the prosecutor". This was in response to the 2007 review by Lord Coulsfield. Before this the accused was entitled to a copy of the indictment with all the charges laid against them, and to a list of prosecution witnesses and productions (other evidence) and to all statements taken by the prosecution and knowledge of witnesses prior criminal records.

== Types of precognition ==
There are two main types of precognition: narrative summaries (written by the precognition officer), and precognitions on oath which are verbatim records.

=== Summaries ===
A regular or conventional precognition is taken by a precognition officer who are employed by solicitors or insurance companies to evaluate the evidence that may be given by the witness whilst under oath. The precognition itself will be a narrative summary produced by the precognition officer, and will not be a verbatim account of the questions and answers, nor will it will be signed by the witness as an accurate account of their words. A summary precognition cannot be used to directly challenge the evidence given by a witness under oath. This is the kind of precognition that can be produced by a defence solicitor, but a witness is not required by law to give such a precognition (though it is Crown Office guidance that a witness should do so.)

=== Precognitions on oath ===
A Sheriff has the power under Section 194H of the Criminal Procedure (Scotland) Act 1995 to issue a citation for a witness to appear before them in chambers; refusal to attend is an offence subject to fine or imprisonment. In a precognition on oath the witness is questioned by the procurator fiscal or defence solicitor in front of the Sheriff, with a shorthand writer taking verbatim notes on the proceedings. A transcript is then made, read over, and signed by both the witness and the sheriff. Such a transcript may be used in court to challenge the evidence given by a witness, at trial, under oath. The defence may only call the complainer in cases of sexual offences when the accused is not present.

== See also ==
- Pre-trial rights of the accused in Scots law
