= Stouthrief =

Scottish crime

Stouthrief or stouthreif (Scots: stouth 'theft' + rief 'reiving, robbery') is the Scottish crime of use or threat of violence against a householder who defends themselves during a housebreaking; it is additional to any associated robbery.

It is to be distinguished from the crime of hamesucken (Old English: hám-sócn, lit. 'home-seeking') which is breaking into the home of an individual and assaulting him where that is the initial purpose. Both are crimes at common law, typically to be found in the description of the crime libelled in court relative to a single incident rather than in the usually less-detailed newspaper reports of such a trial.

Although rarely used, prosecutions for hamesucken were brought in 2011, 2015, 2021, 2022 and more recently in Inverness in 2024.
