= Similar fact evidence =

Conditions under which evidence can be admitted at trial

In the law of evidence, similar fact evidence (or the similar fact principle) establishes the conditions under which factual evidence of past misconduct of the accused can be admitted at trial for the purpose of inferring that the accused committed the misconduct at issue.

== By jurisdiction ==
=== Canada ===
In Canada, the rule was established in R. v. Handy, 164 CCC (3d) 481, 2 SCR 908 (2002):

Evidence of prior bad acts by the accused is admissible if the prosecution satisfies the judge on a balance of probabilities that, in the context of the particular case, the probative value of the evidence in relation to a specific issue outweighs its potential prejudice and thereby justifies its inclusion.

Questions arise as to how the Court is to measure the elements of this rule:

i) What constitutes a prior act of misconduct?

- Past misdeeds need not have resulted in a conviction.

ii) Why does the Court speak of evidence in relation to a 'specific issue'?

- Good measure of probity, what other issue beyond disposition or propensity evidence.

iii) How is probative value determined?

- Nature of similarity between details, distinctive features and circumstances of past and current offences
- Proximity in time between past and current offense
- Number of occurrences of the similar acts
- Any intervening event
- Any other factor tending to support or rebut the unity of past act and conduct in question (i.e. appearance of collusion)

=== England and Wales ===
The 2001 trial of Roy Whiting may have influenced the decision to change the law in England and Wales (R v Handy continues to govern the law in Canada). These changes were brought into force by the 'Bad Character' provisions of the Criminal Justice Act 2003 (sections 98 to 113). Although preceding these changes, Rosemary West's 1995 trial was cited as an example where similar fact evidence was crucial to the prosecution case.

Similar fact evidence can be used even if the original "misconduct" could not be prosecuted due to duress or the offender's youth. In a case of a Devon family imprisoned in 1998, one of the defendants appealed his conviction for raping his sister at age 16, suggesting it was unlikely that she would not complain or seek help. It was held that the evidence that his father had coerced him into sexual acts with his other sisters as a child was similar fact evidence and, in addition to the systematic long-term sexual activity and abuse within the family, sufficient to explain why he felt that he could get away with abusing her and knew she could not rely on her family for protection; his appeal failed. [R v TM, 2000, 2 Cr App 266]

=== New Zealand ===
In New Zealand, the rules regarding similar fact evidence are codified by section 43 of the Evidence Act 2006.

=== Scotland ===
Under Scots law, this is covered by the well-established use of the Moorov Doctrine.

=== United States ===
Under Rule 404 of the United States Federal Rules of Evidence, evidence of a person's character or character trait is not admissible to prove that on a particular occasion the person acted in accordance with the character or trait. Additionally, evidence of a crime, wrong, or other act is not admissible to prove a person's character in order to show that on a particular occasion the person acted in accordance with the character. This evidence may be admissible for another purpose, such as proving motive, opportunity, intent, preparation, plan, knowledge, identity, absence of mistake, or lack of accident.

== See also ==
- Doctrine of chances
