= Corroboration in Scots law =

Evidentiary requirement in Scotland

The importance of corroboration is unique to Scots criminal law. A long-standing feature of Scots law, the requirement for corroborating evidence means at least two independent sources of evidence are required in support of each crucial fact before an accused can be convicted of a crime. This means, for example, that an admission of guilt by the accused is insufficient evidence to convict in Scotland, because that evidence needs to be corroborated by another source.

== History ==
Corroboration had, in some way, already been established by the time the earliest Institutional Writers had begun to illustrate Scots criminal law. MacKenzie described the 'singularity' of witnesses, and their 'contrariety', as insufficient proof – subsequently repeated by Hume, '...no one shall in any case be convicted on the testimony of a single witness'. A similar statement appears in Alison.

Corroboration also has origins in Roman law (unus testis, nullus testis). The Code of Justinian read, 'We plainly order that the evidence of only one witness shall not be taken'. It has been suggested that at this time, the requirement was based on the distrust of juries – however, it is suggested that it was the mistrust of judges instead, which allowed corroboration to take root.

Following the case of Cadder v HM Advocate in 2010, Lord Carloway was appointed to lead a review of the corroboration rule. In this review, Lord Carloway proposed that the current requirement for corroboration in criminal cases should be abolished. However, the abolition of the rule of corroboration was resisted by those who did not at the time consider this to be prudent either because of the risk of miscarriage of justice or because it was unlikely to increase conviction rates. Doubters included the judiciary, led by Lord President Lord Gill, whose opposition in November 2013 persuaded the Scottish government of the day not for the time being to proceed with change. In April 2015, following a review by Lord Bonomy, the Scottish government decided not to proceed immediately with reform but to reconsider the issue as part of a much wider review of the law of evidence. Lord Bonomy considered that corroboration was still desirable in cases of hearsay evidence and of confession. Accordingly the then Criminal Justice (Scotland) Bill had provisions related to corroboration removed. By 2022, two thirds of Scottish judges were of the opinion when consulted that corroboration should be abolished, both for the complexity of its rules, and for the problems posed in rape or domestic abuse cases involving women or children. The minority still supported corroboration retention as an important protection.

== Corroboration in modern practice ==
Corroboration is required in Scots law as the evidence of one witness, however credible, is not sufficient to prove a charge against an accused or to establish any material or crucial fact. There are two prime facts that are deemed to be crucial; the first being that the crime was committed and the second being that it was committed by the accused. Crucial facts must be proved beyond reasonable doubt by corroborative evidence.

It is the responsibility of the police to gather all available evidence and disclose it to the Crown. The Crown will decide what evidence will be led and in which court should a trial be required. A common form of corroboration in regards to criminal offences is there are two or more witnesses to an offence. Any witness undertaking an oath in court is accepted as being a 'credible witness and as such, their statement to the court must be taken as truth (although a defence lawyer will attempt to prove this not to be the case through cross examination, undermining their character, pointing out inconsistencies, etc.). If a reporter of an offence makes a statement saying suspect X hit them and there is a witness who makes a statement that they saw this happen, this is corroboration and this is sufficiency of evidence, providing suitable grounds for the suspect to be charged by police and have their status changed to 'accused'. In a case in 2019, the Inner House ruled that sexually assaulting one victim could amount to corroboration of rape of another person. In Lord Advocate’s Reference No. 1 of 2023 it was held by the Inner House that proof of a victim's distress after an alleged rape could constitute corroboration of a lack of consent. Lord Carloway, presiding over a seven judge panel, was quoted as stating that an overly technical approach increased the risk of a miscarriage of justice. A year later, in June 2024, a nine judge panel was called to hear a further case in which a ruling was sought by the Lord Advocate, Dorothy Bain, that the prosecution could rely on statements taken shortly after an alleged rape as corroboration of other evidence and of the fact that the accused committed the crime. In practice this would allow a single witness case to satisfy the corroboration requirement.

Corroboration could include:

- CCTV – This must show footage relevant to the offence in which the suspect can be identified (usually by police officers or witnesses) – in this instance, it is not the CCTV that is the corroboration, but is it the police or witnesses identifying the suspect on CCTV that are the corroboration;
- Injuries – Again, the injury in and of itself is not sufficient. A medical statement from a trained person such as a doctor stating; "This injury was caused by blunt trauma to the back of the head, within which there are small fragments of glass" is the corroboration, not the injury;
- Forensic evidence – Fingerprints and DNA primarily, with again, the Forensic Scientist identifying those pieces of evidence as belonging to the accused being the corroboration
- Telecomms information – Where an application was submitted and approved to identify the owner of a phone number, it is this information which identifies the phone as belonging to the accused, but again, it is the police officer who corroborates this to be a true document

In instances where there is no direct corroboration, police can still accumulate sufficient indirect or circumstantial evidence to allow a prosecution to be pursued.

Circumstantial evidence can be:

- Motive – Accused was motivated to commit crime through greed, revenge, malice, etc.
- Ability – Accused had the skills or strength etc., necessary to commit crime
- Guilty intent – Accused acted with the intention of committing the crime. For example, a planned armed robbery
- Identification – Forensic evidence, DNA, fingerprints, fibres, etc.
- Conduct after the crime – Evidence that the accused has disposed of incriminating evidence, 'laid low' etc.
- Opportunity – Evidence that the accused was at or near the locus at the time, or had privileged access, etc.
- Preparation – Evidence that the accused purchased a weapon or obtained housebreaking tools in preparation to commit the crime, etc.

== Moorov doctrine ==
The Moorov doctrine is a doctrine that deals with similar fact evidence in Scots law, arising from the case of Moorov v HM Advocate in 1930. The Moorov doctrine can be used where a series of crimes have been committed and are closely linked by time, character, circumstance and place of commission as to constitute a course of conduct by the accused. The accused must be positively identified in each case. There may only be one witness to each individual crime who can identify the accused but where the offences are sufficiently similar the witness for one offence can corroborate the account of a witness for another offence.

== Howden doctrine ==
The Howden doctrine arises from Howden v HM Advocate. The doctrine is used where the accused is charged with two offences but has only been positively identified for one of the offences. The identification can be made by an eyewitness to the offence or other evidence such as forensic evidence. Where the jury is satisfied beyond reasonable doubt that the accused committed one of the offences and the other offence must have been committed by whoever committed the first offence then the accused can be convicted of both offences.

== Exceptions ==
There are some limited exceptions to the requirement for corroboration in criminal cases. Examples include some minor road traffic offences listed under section 21 of the Road Traffic Offenders Act 1988.

== See also ==
- Pre-trial rights of the accused in Scots law
- Corpus delicti
- Criminal procedure
- Evidence (law)
- Legal technicality
