= Unus testis, nullus testis =

Latin legal maxim

Unus testis, nullus testis (lit. 'one witness, no witness') is a Latin legal phrase describing a rule of the law of evidence. According to this rule, the uncorroborated testimony of one witness should be discounted because it is deemed to be too unreliable to establish a fact. The English equivalent of the phrase is "one man, no man".

The historical foundations of the unus testis-rule are various passages in the Old and New Testament and a constitution of emperor Constantine I of AD 334. While the applicability of this rule has generally been in decline, it is still present in contemporary Dutch criminal procedure and the canon law of the Catholic Church and similar to the ongoing requirement of corroboration in Scots law.

The rule has been criticized for impeding convictions for certain types of crimes (especially sexual assault) which often only have the perpetrator and the victim present.

== Legal institution ==
The unus testis-rule is part of a larger formalist conception of the law of evidence, which has been characterized as the "numerical system" by American legal scholar John Henry Wigmore. According to the numerical system, a single witness to a fact is in principle not sufficient to establish a fact as proven. While two witnesses suffice for many facts, a larger number of witnesses is required for the establishment of certain special facts (for example the Justinian requirement of five witnesses for the establishment of a legal family relationship). Additionally, specific weight is sometimes given to a witness' testimony, for example, by counting it as half or a quarter of that of a regular witness. The numerical system is a component of the civil law-legal tradition and has generally not been part of the common law (with the notable exception of the crime of treason where two witnesses are required (Note: See, for example, Article Three of the United States Constitution.)).

The reasoning behind the unus testis-rule is that while witnesses are very frequently used in judicial proceedings, their testimony is often unreliable, due to errors of perception, gaps in memory or reproduction, or even intentional falsification, among other things. Requiring more than one witness to establish a fact is therefore a way to mitigate this inherent unreliability. The rule thus aims at the disclosure of truth during trial and safeguarding the defendant by providing them with procedural guarantees against erroneous or fabricated testimony.

In 2000, Christin Coan noted that this rule has been criticized, especially in cases like rape where often only the perpetrator and the victim are present. Requiring two witnesses makes it very hard or even impossible to secure a conviction under these circumstances. In international criminal law this reasoning has resulted in Rule 96(i) (Note: Rule 96 Evidence in Cases of Sexual Assault In cases of sexual assault: (i) no corroboration of the victim's testimony shall be required;) of the Rules of Procedure and Evidence of the International Criminal Tribunal for the former Yugoslavia that explicitly precludes a requirement for corroboration in cases of sexual assault.

== History ==
=== Roman law ===
Classical Roman law, that is Roman law until the end of the second century AD, did not contain the unus testis-rule according to current scholarly understanding, even though D. 22.5.12 (Note: D. 22.5.12 Ulpianus 37 ad ed. Ubi numerus testium non adicitur, etiam duo sufficient: pluralis enim elocutio duorum numero contenta est. (transl. If the number of witnesses is not mentioned, two are enough, since the plural is satisfied by two.)) – a passage of the Digest attributed to the early 3rd century Roman jurist Ulpian – had historically been understood as evidence for the existence of such a rule during this period. The rule is now said to have been introduced into Roman law by a constitution of emperor Constantine I in AD 334, which was later codified by emperor Justinian I as CJ 4.20.9.

Iusiurandi religione testes, priusquam perhibeant testimonium, iam dudum artari praecipimus, et ut honestioribus potius fides testibus habeatur, simili more sanximus ut unius testimonium nemo iudicum in quacumque causa facile patiatur admitti. Et nunc manifeste sancimus ut unius omnino testis responsio non audiatur, etiamsi praeclarae curiae honore praefulgeat.

We have previously commanded that, before they give their testimony, witnesses shall be bound by the sanctity of an oath, and that greater trust shall be placed in witnesses of more honourable status. In a similar manner we sanctioned that no judge should easily allow the testimony of only one person to be admitted in any case whatever. We now manifestly sanction that the testimony of only one witness shall not be heard at all, even though such witness should be resplendent with the honour of the glorious council.

— CJ 4.20.9 [Imperator Constantinus A. ad Iulianum praesidem]

=== Biblical foundations ===
The rule also has biblical roots; the requirement of two or more witnesses is often attested to in the Old and New Testament. In the Old Testament, the Book of Deuteronomy (17:6 (Note: At the mouth of two witnesses, or three witnesses, shall he that is worthy of death be put to death; but at the mouth of one witness he shall not be put to death. (KJV)) and 19:15 (Note: One witness shall not rise up against a man for any iniquity, or for any sin, in any sin that he sinneth: at the mouth of two witnesses, or at the mouth of three witnesses, shall the matter be established. (KJV))), as well as the Book of Numbers (35:30 (Note: Whoso killeth any person, the murderer shall be put to death by the mouth of witnesses: but one witness shall not testify against any person to cause him to die. (KJV))) are pointed to. While in the New Testament, for example, the Gospel of Matthew (18:16 (Note: But if he will not hear thee, then take with thee one or two more, that in the mouth of two or three witnesses every word may be established. (KJV))), the Gospel of John (8:17 (Note: It is also written in your law, that the testimony of two men is true. (KJV))) and the Second Epistle to the Corinthians (13:1 (Note: This is the third time I am coming to you. In the mouth of two or three witnesses shall every word be established. (KJV))) form the basis for the rule.

=== Later use and decline ===
The unus testis-rule was part of the ius commune and the codified law of Prussia and Austria in the 18th century. The 1793 Prussian Allgemeine Gerichtsordnung für die Preußischen Staaten (General Court Order for the Prussian States) formulated in its Title 13 Section 10 Number 3 that a fact would only be established if two or more credible witnesses would testify to it from their own experience and with complete trustworthiness. (Note: §. 10. Bis zur völligen Ueberzeugung ist eine Thatsache ausgemittelt, wenn hinlängliche, glaubwürdige, und unter sich in keinem Widerspruche stehende Beweismittel vorhanden sind. Ohne das richterliche Ermessen in zu enge Schranken einzuschließen, lassen sich nur folgende Fälle auszeichnen, in welchen eine Thatsache für völlig erwiesen anzunehmen ist: [...] 3) Wenn zwei oder mehrere glaubwürdige Zeugen eine Thatsache aus eigener Wissenschaft mit völliger Zuverlässigkeit bekunden.) The 1781 Austrian Allgemeine Gerichtsordnung (General Court Rules of Austria) promulgated in its Section 137 that a fact to be proven by witnesses alone required the unanimous testimony of two unobjectionable witnesses. (Note: § 137. Zu einem vollständigen Beweise, da dieser lediglich durch Zeugen geführt werden will, wird die einstimmige Aussage zweyer unbedenklicher Zeugen erforderet; wenn jedoch auch andere obschon für sich allein nicht hinlängliche Beweismittel beygebracht worden sind, kann auch die Aussage eines unbedenklichen, oder auch eines, oder mehrerer bedenklichen Zeugen den Beweis ergänzen. Nicht minder kann auch durch mehrere bedenkliche Zeugen ein vollständiger Beweis hergestellt werden. In solchen Fällen wird der Richter die Vollständigkeit des Beweises nach genauer Ueberlegung aller Umstände zu beurtheilen haben.)

The German legal scholar Andreas Wacke has argued that the decline of the requirement for two or more witnesses for the establishment of a fact in some civil law-jurisdictions was brought on by the abolition of torture as a lawful method of judicial fact-finding. The confession of the accused was the usual basis for a conviction in the inquisitorial system. If the accused did not confess to the alleged crime and only a single witness was at hand, his confession could be forced by torture and a conviction thereby secured. After the abolition of judicial torture (which happened in Prussia in June 1740 and in Austria in January 1776), every accused, who had not confessed, was to be acquitted if only one witness was presented – even if strong suspicions of the crime existed. Because this was gradually felt to be unsatisfactory, Wacke argues that the unus testis-rule was abrogated in many jurisdictions.

== Current status ==
The unus testis-rule continues to be the law in some legal systems, for example in Catholic canon law and Dutch criminal procedure. It has also been compared to the continuing requirement of corroboration in Scots law. According to the Scottish corroboration rule two independent sources of evidence are generally needed in a criminal trial to establish a fact. In other legal systems which had contained the rule at an earlier point in time it has now been abolished. This is the case under Portuguese law, where it was enshrined as article 2512 of the 1867 Código de Seabra, but now is no longer a part of this legal system.

=== Canon law ===
A remnant of the rule can be found in the canon law of the Catholic church. Originally, the 1917 Code of Canon Law contained a strict requirement for at least two witnesses in its canon 1791. This requirement was subsequently relaxed and in the current canon 1573 of the 1983 Code of Canon law, it is stated that while in principle the deposition of one witness cannot amount to full proof two explicit exceptions are also provided for.

The testimony of one witness cannot produce full proof unless it concerns a qualified witness making a deposition concerning matters done ex officio, or unless the circumstances of things and persons suggest otherwise.

— Can. 1573

In cases to declare the nullity of marriage, the current canon 1678 furthermore explicitly provides that the testimony of one witness can establish full proof in some cases; this canon is thus even less restrictive.

=== Dutch criminal procedure ===
The unus testis-rule is codified in Article 342(2) of the Dutch Code of Criminal Procedure (the Wetboek van Strafvordering): a crime charged cannot be proven by the testimony of a sole witness.

Het bewijs dat de verdachte het telastegelegde feit heeft begaan, kan door den rechter niet uitsluitend worden aangenomen op de verklaring van één getuige.

Proof that the accused committed the crime charged cannot be assumed by the court solely on the testimony of a single witness.

— Artikel 342(2) Wetboek van Strafvordering

== See also ==
- Corroboration in Scots law
