= R v Handy =

- Supreme Court of Canada

Hearing: October 9, 2001 Judgment: June 21, 2002
- Full case name: Her Majesty The Queen v. James Handy
- Citations: [2002] 2 S.C.R. 908, 2002 SCC 56

Court membership
- Chief Justice: Beverley McLachlin; Puisne Justices: Claire L'Heureux-Dubé, Charles Gonthier, Frank Iacobucci, John C. Major, Michel Bastarache, Ian Binnie, Louise Arbour, Louis LeBel

Reasons given
- Unanimous reasons by: Binnie J.

R v Handy, [2002] 2 S.C.R. 908, 2002 SCC 56, is the leading Supreme Court of Canada decision on similar fact evidence. The Court proposed what is known as the Handy test for determining whether past occurrences that resemble the crime can be admitted as evidence.

== Background ==
The complainant went out drinking with her friends and met James Handy whom she had known for several months. They went home together and what began as consensual sex became violent.

Handy was charged with sexual assault causing bodily harm. The Crown tried to introduce evidence of Handy's history with his ex-wife which involved seven past sexual assaults on her. The trial judge allowed it.

The issue before the Supreme Court was whether Handy's history of violence with his ex-wife was admissible as evidence.

== Ruling of the Court ==
Justice Binnie, writing for the Court, used this case to restate the approach to similar fact evidence. He stated that a "principled approach" must be used where the probative value must be weighed against the prejudicial effect.

When examining probative value several factors must be considered. First, the court must examine the strength of the evidence in showing that the past events actually occurred. The credibility of the witness must be considered and if there is any motive to lie must have an effect.

Second, the court must consider whether there was any potential collusion between the witness and the claimant. If there was merely an opportunity to collude then the question is left to the jury, otherwise if there is "some evidence of collusion" then the onus is on the Crown to show on the balance of probabilities that no collusion occurred.

Third, the court must consider the scope of the issue in question. If it is a very broad issue, then the threshold for probative value will be very high. If it concerns a material issue in the trial, then it should be looked upon favourably.

Fourth, the court must consider whether the evidence supports the inference that the Crown is attempting to draw. This involves examining the similarities between the events. Factors include:

- the proximity in time between the events
- the extent to which the other events are factually similar
- the number of occurrences of the similar events
- the circumstances surrounding the events
- the distinctiveness of the events
- the existence of any intervening events

Next Binnie considered what prejudicial effects should be considered. He divided it into moral prejudice and reasoning prejudice. Moral prejudice includes evidence that will cause the jury to think that the accused is a bad person. This is particularly where the past events were acts that were more reprehensible than the current facts. The reasoning prejudice includes evidence that presents a risk of distraction, confusion, and evidence that will consume too much time.

Using this test Binnie found that the evidence put forward by the Crown was inadmissible.

== See also ==
- List of Supreme Court of Canada cases (McLachlin Court)
