= Pre-trial rights of the accused in Scots law =

Rights granted in Scottish criminal proceedings

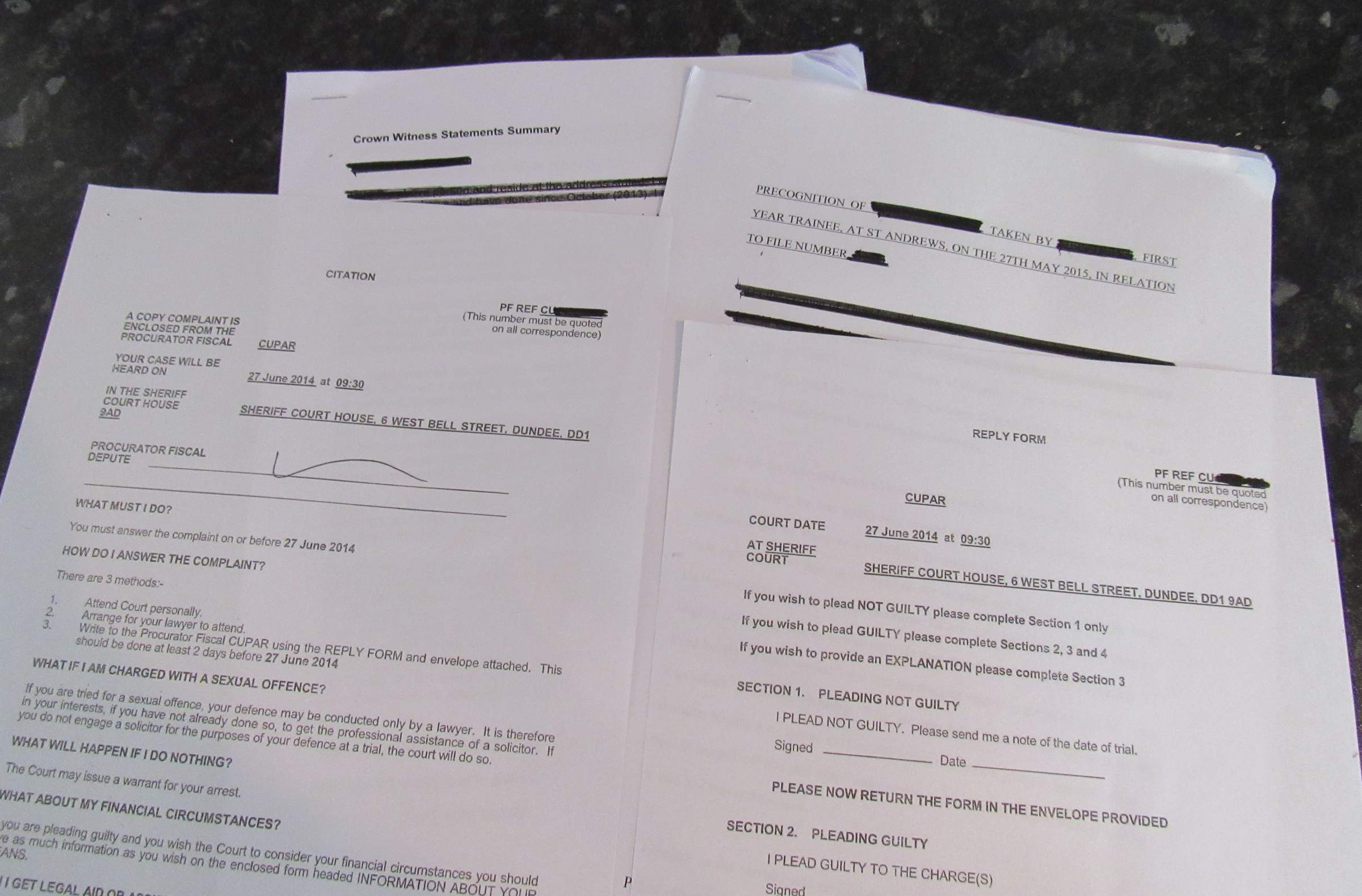
Photo of redacted citation document, Crown witness statements, and prosecution witness precognition interview report

The legal system in Scotland grants certain rights to persons accused in criminal proceedings.

== Right to retain a personal copy of the complaint document ==
At all times the accused has the right to retain a copy of the complaint document. The complaint document is marked CITATION and is sent out by the procurator fiscal, the Scottish body responsible for prosecutions.

== Right to request precognition interviews of prosecution witnesses ==
The purpose of a precognition interview is to establish what a witness will say in response to prosecution and defence questions at trial. The accused may ask for Police Scotland officers to be precognosced.

== Right to request precognition of defence witnesses ==
People who would be helpful for the defence of trial may be requested to provide a precognition interview via the defence solicitor.

== Right to call defence witnesses to trial ==
The accused has the right to ask the defence solicitor to call defence witnesses to trial.

== Right to have access to crown witness statements ==
Some solicitors will email the crown witness statements in full. Other solicitors might provide summary versions of these statements.

== Right to serve a "Statement of uncontroversial evidence" ==
The accused may serve a statement of uncontroversial evidence on the procurator fiscal and the court. A defence solicitor can undertake this on the accused behalf. If the procurator fiscal does not respond the evidence in the statement is taken as proven for the purposes of the trial.

== Right to change defence solicitors ==
If a defence solicitor does not provide legal advice or refuses to undertake requested precognitions, the accused has a right to change solicitors.

== Right to complain to the Scottish Legal Complaints Commission (SLCC) ==
If a solicitor refuses to undertake precognition interviews for the defence of the case the accused has a right to complain to the Scottish Legal Complaints Commission.

== See also ==
- Rights of the accused
- Corroboration in Scots law
- Moorov v HM Advocate
- Cadder v HM Advocate
