= Dickinson v Dodds =

English contract law case

- Court: Court of Appeal, Divisional Court, Chancery Division
- Citation: (1876) 2 Ch D 463

Keywords
- Offer and acceptance

Dickinson v Dodds (1876) 2 Ch D 463 is an English contract law case heard by the Court of Appeal, Chancery Division, which held that notification by a third party of an offer's withdrawal is effective just like a withdrawal by the person who made an offer. The significance of this case to many students of contract law is that a promise to keep an offer open (an option) is itself a contract which must have some consideration.

== Facts ==
On Wednesday 10 June 1874, Mr Dodds delivered Mr Dickinson an offer to sell some houses for £800, an offer open until 9am on Friday 12 June. On Thursday afternoon, another man called Mr Berry told Mr Dickinson that the houses had already been sold to someone called Mr Allan (who was the second defendant). Mr Dickinson found Mr Dodds in the railway carriage at 7am on Friday, leaving Darlington railway station, and gave his acceptance there. But Mr Dodds said it was too late. Mr Dickinson sued for breach of contract.

== Judgment ==
James LJ held that Mr Berry had conveyed notice of the withdrawal of the offer. After referring to the document of 10 June 1874 he said the following:

The document, though beginning, "I hereby agree to sell”, was nothing but an offer, and was only intended to be an offer, for the Plaintiff himself tells us that he required time to consider whether he would enter into an agreement or not. Unless both parties had then agreed there was no concluded agreement then made; it was in effect and substance only an offer to sell. The plaintiff being minded not to complete the bargain at that time adds this memorandum: "This offer is to be left over until Friday, 9 o'clock a.m. 12th June 1874." That shows it was only an offer. There was no consideration given for the undertaking or promise, to whatever extent it may be considered binding, to keep the property unsold until 9 o'clock on Friday morning; but apparently Dickinson was of opinion, and probably Dodds was of the same opinion, that he (Dodds) was bound by that promise, and could not in any way withdraw from it, or retract it, until 9 o'clock on Friday morning, and this probably explains a good deal of what afterwards took place. But it is clear settled law, on one of the clearest principles of law, that this promise, being a mere nudum pactum, was not binding, and that at any moment before a complete acceptance by Dickinson of the offer, Dodds was as free as Dickinson himself. Well, that being the state of things, it is said that the only mode in which Dodds could assert that freedom was by actually and distinctly saying to Dickinson, "Now I withdraw my offer.” It appears to me that there is neither principle nor authority for the proposition that there must be an express and actual withdrawal of the offer, or what is called a retractation. It must, to constitute a contract, appear that the two minds were at one, at the same moment of time, that is, that there was an offer continuing up to the time of the acceptance. If there was not such a continuing offer, then the acceptance comes to nothing. Of course it may well be that the one man is bound in some way or other to let the other man know that his mind with regard to the offer has been changed; but in this case, beyond all question, the Plaintiff knew that Dodds was no longer minded to sell the property to him as plainly and clearly as if Dodds had told him in so many words, "I withdraw the offer.” This is evidence from the Plaintiff's own statements in the bill. The Plaintiff says in effect that, having heard and knowing that Dodds was no longer minded to sell to him, and that he was selling or had sold to some one else, thinking that he could not in point of law withdraw his offer, meaning to fix him to it, and endeavoring to bind him, "I went to the house where he was lodging, and saw his mother-in-law, and left with her an acceptance of the offer, knowing all the while that he had entirely changed his mind. I got an agent to watch for him at 7 o'clock the next morning, and I went to the train just before 9 o'clock, in order that I might catch him and give him my notice of acceptance just before 9 o'clock, and when that occurred he told my agent, and he told me, you are too late, and he then threw back the paper." It is to my mind quite clear that before there was any attempt at acceptance by the Plaintiff, he was perfectly well aware that Dodds had changed his mind, and that he had in fact agreed to sell the property to Allan. It is impossible, therefore, to say that there was ever that existence of the same mind between the two parties which is essential in point of law to the making of an agreement. I am of opinion, therefore, that the Plaintiff has failed to prove that there was any binding contract between Dodds and himself.

Mellish LJ agreed and said,

just as when a man who has made an offer dies before it is accepted it is impossible that it can then be accepted, so when once the person to whom the offer was made knows that the property has been sold to some one else, it is too late for him to accept the offer, and on that ground I am clearly of the opinion that there was no binding contract for the sale of this property…

Baggallay JA concurred.

== Significance ==
Communication of the withdrawal of the offer can be made by any reliable third party. An option must have consideration to be binding.

== See also ==
- Contract
- Offer and acceptance
- Invitation to treat
