= Kay's Tutor v Ayrshire & Arran Health Board =

Kay's Tutor v. Ayrshire & Arran Health Board [1987] 2 All ER 417; 1987 S.C. 145; 1987 S.L.T. 577; is a Scots Delict Law case concerning causation in a medical negligence context. It was decided by the House of Lords, with Lord Keith of Kinkel, Lord Brandon of Oakbrook, Lord Griffiths, Lord Mackay of Clashfern and Lord Ackner sitting.

== Facts ==
Kay's son was admitted to hospital with meningitis. By mistake, he was given a penicillin overdose. It was thirty times the norm. He went deaf. No case had ever been recorded where penicillin had caused deafness. Often, meningitis itself caused deafness. The first instance found in favour of the pursuer, but this was overturned by the Court of Appeal. In the House of Lords the pursuer argued, the overdose increased the risk of neurological damage. Deafness was damage of the same type, therefore the defenders should be liable. Lord Keith demonstrated grasp of medical knowledge by describing the facts somewhat more elaborately.

"Meningitis is a disease which causes inflammation of one or more of the three membranes which envelop the central nervous system consisting of the brain and spinal chord [sic]. The three membranes are the dura mater, the arachnoid and the pia mater. Between the arachnoid and the underlying pia mater is the subarachnoid space, which is filled with cerebro-spinal fluid (CSF). The general practitioner had treated the respiratory infection with ampicillin administered orally, but due to vomiting its therapeutic effect may have been to some extent frustrated. On admission to hospital Andrew was found to be seriously ill. He was treated with benzyl penicillin and sulphadiazine administered intravenously. A specimen of CSF was taken and sent for analysis. On the following day, 29 November, the laboratory reported that two cultures of pneumococci had been cultivated from the specimen. This led to a confirmed diagnosis of pneumococcal meningitis, a most virulent form of the disease. The consultant paediatrician in charge of the case, Dr McClure, instructed that 10,000 units of penicillin be injected intrathecally, that is to say by way of lumbar puncture into the subarachnoid space containing the CSF. The reason for this procedure was to bring about that the penicillin might most readily reach the infected meninges and attack the bacteria which were causing the disease. The injection was carried out shortly after noon on that day by Dr Adam-Strump, a senior house officer. By mistake he injected about 300,000 units of penicillin instead of 10,000 units. This rapidly produced toxic effects. The child went into convulsions and later developed a degree of hemiparesis, that is to say paralysis on one side of his body. Dr Adam-Strump realised his mistake immediately, and remedial measures were urgently instituted. These were successful in saving the child's life and by 1 December the immediate ill effects of the overdose appeared to have been surmounted. A rapid recovery from the meningitis also followed. He was discharged from hospital on 24 December. His parents before then had begun to suspect that he was suffering from deafness. This proved to be indeed the case. He was suffering and still suffers from profound bilateral deafness."

== Judgment ==
It was held that where two competing causes of damage existed the law could not presume that the tortious cause was responsible. It needed to be proved that it was an accepted fact that the tortious cause was capable of aggravating the damage. The case was distinguished from McGhee v. National Coal Board.

Lord Ackner, who gave the final judgment, offered a good anecdotal account of the evidence at trial about the possible causes of the boy's deafness.

"Dr McAllister, consultant bacteriologist in the Royal Hospital for Sick Children, Queen Mother's Hospital, Glasgow had made a special study in laboratory and clinical assessment of antibiotics, organising many symposia on antibiotics all over the world and, in particular, Europe and the United States. His contributions to the literature on this subject numbered nearly 100, including 20 dealing with penicillins. He confirmed that pneumococcal meningitis was the classical disease for producing deafness. He was asked whether he had ever come across any information which would suggest that an overdose of intrathecal penicillin causes or could cause deafness. He said he had searched the literature, he had computer scans done by three different processes, he had watched for years and in his experience there was no single recorded case of deafness from such an overdose. He was asked in terms by the Lord Ordinary whether, as a bacteriologist, he was saying there was any reason why an overdose of penicillin injected intrathecally could not cause deafness. His reply was:

"As a medical scientist I need evidence for things, without evidence and without rational balance of evidence medicine is a dead duck and in this case there is no evidence that an overdose of intrathecal Benzylpenicillin ever has caused deafness." In answer to a further question from the learned judge he said:

"All things are possible and in medicine we never say never, but from the point of view of scientific medicine to my mind there is no evidence to incriminate an overdose of intrathecal Benzylpenicillin as a cause of deafness in this or in other cases and on the other side of the waterfall there is a massive amount of evidence to incriminate pneumococcal meningitis as one of the best known causes."

The only evidence to the effect that penicillin was the cause of the boy's deafness came from Mr Williams, a neuro-surgeon. His theory that penicillin injected intrathecally would itself have a destructive effect on the auditory nerve was rejected by the Lord Ordinary. The Lord Ordinary, however, developed his own theory, which was not put to any of the expert medical witnesses who gave evidence for the respondents nor was it canvassed at all at the hearing. The First Division of the Court of Session held that the appellant was not entitled to succeed on the basis of this theory and this decision has not been challenged before your Lordships.

Lord Ackner agreed that this case was distinguishable from McGhee. In McGhee there was no problem about evidence that the failure to provide a shower could have caused Mr McGhee's dermatitis. The "could have" element simply reflected that it was uncertain which cause (the brick dust at work, or the lack of a shower) was the operating cause of dermatitis. But here, the idea that the penicillin overdose "could have" caused deafness was of a different quality. It was not just of lesser degree of possibility, but that there was no evidential basis for the assertion at all.

== See also ==
- Negligence
