= Ross v HM Advocate =

Scots criminal law case decided by the High Court of Justiciary

Ross v Her Majesty's Advocate
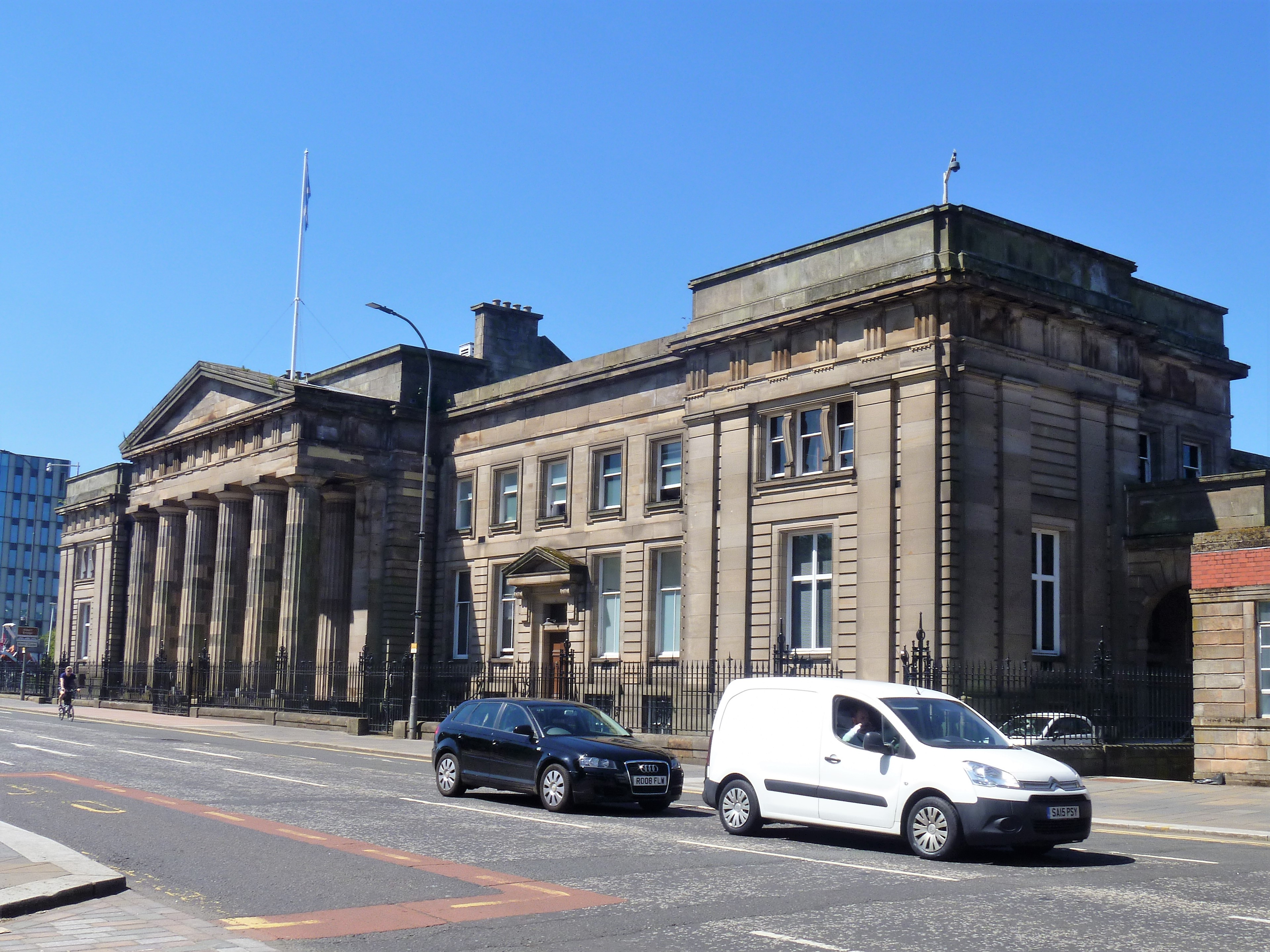
- Justiciary Buildings, Glasgow
- Court: High Court of Justiciary
- Decided: 12 July 1991
- Citation: 1991 JC 210, 1991 SLT 564, 1991 SCCR 823, [1991] ScotHC HCJAC_2

Court membership
- Judges sitting: Lord Justice-General Hope, Lord Allanbridge, Lord McCluskey, Lord Weir, and Lord Brand.

Keywords
- Automatism

Ross v HM Advocate 1991 JC 210 is a leading Scots criminal case that concerns automatism as defence. The High Court of Justiciary clarified the rules for an accused to successfully argue automatism as a defence to a criminal charge.

== Background ==
Ross had been drinking beer from a can. Without his knowledge, five or six tablets of temazepam and some of LSD was put into his can. He ended up consuming the drugs alongside the beer. Thirty minutes after having consumed the drink, he started screaming and indiscriminately attacking other people with a knife. Several people were severely injured. Ross resisted arrest by the police and stopped screaming only after they had handcuffed him. He continued to struggle until he was taken to a hospital and administered a sedative drug.

The High Court at Glasgow tried Ross for various charges including nine counts of assault and seven counts of attempted murder. The jury found Ross guilty on several of the charges but found that while he committed the offences, he had been influenced by the drugs that were administered to him without his knowledge. He has appealed against his conviction on the ground that the trial judge misdirected the jury that they could not acquit him of the charges of which he was convicted.

Ross appealed the decision to the Court of Criminal Appeal. He argued that the trial judge had misdirected the jury by telling them that they could not acquit Ross of the offences, in spite of his involuntary intoxication.

== Appellate decision ==
A five-judge bench of the Appeal Court upheld Ross' appeal and set a precedent for successfully using automatism as a defence in Scots criminal law. The Lord Justice-General Hope identified three requirements for automatism:

1. There must some external factor affecting the accused, and not a mental disorder.
2. That external factor must not be self-induced or foreseeable to the accused.
3. That external factor must result in a total alienation of reason for the accused.

Later cases suggested that the Scottish precedent established in Ross would be followed in England as well.
