= Special defence =

Legal custom in Scotland

A special defence in Scots law may be raised in criminal proceedings upon notice by the accused ahead of the trial. If established, it results in an acquittal. The only purpose of the special defence procedure is to give fair notice: it does not prejudice the plea of not guilty by an accused; the Crown still must prove the acts charged beyond a reasonable doubt.

== Notice given ==
In solemn proceedings (prosecutions on indictment of more serious criminal offences before a judge and jury of 15 persons) notice of a special defence must be given at least 10 days before the trial date and the jury is advised of the special defence immediately after the indictment has been read (or summarised) and each juror is given a copy of the accused's notice.

== Types of special defence ==
The types of special defence are: mental disorder (when the offence was committed or before the trial), incrimination (alleging someone else committed the crime), coercion, automatism, self-defence, consent (under some circumstances), or alibi.
