= Offer and acceptance =

Components of a legally-binding contract

Offer and acceptance are generally recognized as essential requirements for the formation of a contract (together with other requirements such as consideration and legal capacity). Analysis of their operation is a traditional approach in contract law. This classical approach to contract formation has been modified by developments in the law of estoppel, misleading conduct, misrepresentation, unjust enrichment, and power of acceptance.

== Offer ==
=== Definition ===
Guenter Treitel defines an offer as "an expression of willingness to contract on certain terms, made with the intention that it shall become binding as soon as it is accepted by the person to whom it is addressed", the "offeree". An offer is a statement of the terms on which the offeror is willing to be bound. The same emphasis on "willingness" is expressed in the Restatement (Second) of Contracts: "an offer is the manifestation of willingness to enter into a bargain, so made as to justify another person in understanding that his assent to that bargain is invited and will conclude it".

The expression of an offer may take different forms, and which form is acceptable varies by jurisdiction. Offers may be presented in a letter, newspaper advertisement, fax, email verbally or even conduct, as long as it communicates the basis on which the offeror is prepared to contract. Traditionally the common law treated advertisements as being unable to contain offers, but this view is considered less forceful in jurisdictions today.

Whether the two parties have reached agreement on the terms or whether a valid offer has been made is a legal question. In some jurisdictions, courts use criteria known as 'the objective test', which was explained in the leading English case of Smith v. Hughes. In Smith v. Hughes, the court emphasised that the important thing in determining whether there has been a valid offer is not the party's own (subjective) intentions but how a reasonable person would view the situation. The objective test has largely been superseded in the UK by the introduction of the Brussels Regime in combination with the Rome I Regulation.

An offer can be the basis of a binding contract only if it contains the key terms of the contract. For example, in some jurisdictions, a minimum requirement for sale of goods contracts is the following four terms: delivery date, price, terms of payment that includes the date of payment, and a detailed description of the item on offer including a fair description of the condition or type of service. Other jurisdictions vary or eliminate these requirements. Unless the minimum requirements are met, an offer of sale is not classified by the courts as a legal offer but is instead seen as an advertisement.

In line with the definition from Treitel above, to invite acceptance an offer must be serious. In this sense, an obvious joke cannot become the basis of an offer because the potential offeror lacks actual intent to enter into an exchange. For instance, in the famous case of Leonard v. Pepsico, Inc., depiction of a military aircraft offered in exchange for "Pepsi Points" was interpreted by a court as a joke. Despite having clear terms (7,000,000 Pepsi Points in exchange for one aircraft), the humorous elements of the commercial rendered that portion of the advertisement a joke rather than a serious offer.

Whether a potential offer is serious is evaluated under an objective standard, independent of the subjective intent of the one making or accepting the offer. In the case of Lucy v. Zehmer, what one party believed were jests about selling a farm turned into a binding contract, based on the court's evaluation of the circumstance from the perspective of a reasonable observer. Similarly, in the case of Berry v. Gulf Coast Wings Inc., one party's offer of a "Toyota" for the winner of a contest was interpreted as requiring the offeror to provide a vehicle to the winner rather than a "Toy Yoda" doll from Star Wars, despite the assertion that the contest was based on a joke.

=== Counter-offers ===
The "mirror image rule" states that if someone is to accept an offer, they must accept the offer exactly, without modifications; if they change the offer in any way, this is a counter-offer, which kills the original offer. Apparent but conditional acceptance of an offer constitutes a counter-offer: for example in Morton v 4 Orchard Lane Trust, the words "After review of the Contract in this regard, I find same to be acceptable provided the following changes and/or modifications are made thereto ..." showed that there was no "meeting of minds" and that a counter-offer had been put forward.

On submission of a counter-offer, the original offer cannot be accepted at a future time.

=== Unilateral contract ===
A unilateral contract is created when someone offers to do something "in return for" the performance of the act stipulated in the offer. In a unilateral contract, acceptance may not have to be communicated and can be accepted through conduct by performing the act. Nonetheless, the person performing the act must do it in reliance on the offer.

A unilateral contract differs from a bilateral contract, where there is an exchange of promises between two parties. For example, if one party promises to buy a car and the other party promises to sell a car, that is a bilateral contract.

The formation of a unilateral contract can be demonstrated in the English case Carlill v Carbolic Smoke Ball Co. In order to guarantee the effectiveness of the Smoke Ball remedy, the company offered a reward of 100 pounds to anyone who used the remedy and contracted the flu. Once aware of the offer, Carlill accepted the offer when she purchased the Smoke Ball remedy and completed the prescribed course. Upon contracting the flu, she became eligible for the reward. Therefore, the company's offer to pay 100 pounds "in return for" the use of the Smoke Ball remedy and guarantee not to contract the flu was performed by Carlill.

=== Invitations to treat ===
An invitation to treat is not an offer but only an indication of a person's willingness to negotiate toward a contract. It is a pre-offer communication. In the UK case Harvey v. Facey, an indication by the owner of property that he or she might be interested in selling at a certain price, for example, has been regarded as an invitation to treat. Similarly in the English case Gibson v Manchester City Council the words "may be prepared to sell" were held to be a notification of price and therefore not a distinct offer, though in another case concerning the same change of policy (Manchester City Council underwent a change of political control and stopped the sale of council houses to their tenants) Storer v. Manchester City Council, the court held that an agreement was completed by the tenant's signing and returning the agreement to purchase, as the language of the agreement had been sufficiently explicit and the signature on behalf of the council a mere formality to be completed. Statements of invitation are only intended to solicit offers from people and are not intended to result in any immediate binding obligation. The courts have tended to take a consistent approach to the identification of invitations to treat, as compared with offer and acceptance, in common transactions. The display of goods for sale, whether in a shop window or on the shelves of a self-service store, is ordinarily treated as an invitation to treat and not an offer.

The holding of a public auction will also usually be regarded as an invitation to treat. Auctions are, however, a special case generally. The rule is that the bidder is making an offer to buy and the auctioneer accepts this in whatever manner is customary, usually the fall of the hammer. A bidder may withdraw his or her bid at any time before the fall of the hammer, but any bid in any event lapses as an offer on the making of a higher bid, so that if a higher bid is made, then withdrawn before the fall of the hammer, the auctioneer cannot then purport to accept the previous highest bid. If an auction is without reserve then, whilst there is no contract of sale between the owner of the goods and the highest bidder (because the placing of goods in the auction is an invitation to treat), there is a collateral contract between the auctioneer and the highest bidder that the auction will be held without reserve (i.e., that the highest bid, however low, will be accepted). The U.S. Uniform Commercial Code provides that in an auction without reserve the goods may not be withdrawn once they have been put up.

=== Revocation of offer ===
An offeror may revoke an offer before it has been accepted, but the revocation must be communicated to the offeree (although not necessarily by the offeror). If the offer was made to the entire world, such as in Carlill's case, the revocation must take a form that is similar to the offer. However, an offer may not be revoked if it has been encapsulated in an option (see also option contract), or if it is a "firm offer" in which case it is irrevocable for the period specified by the offeror. For example, in the United States, the Uniform Commercial Code allows merchants (e.g., those who deal in the type of goods at issue) to create firm offers for up to three months without consideration, through a signed writing.

If the offer is one that leads to a unilateral contract, the offer generally cannot be revoked once the offeree has begun performance.

=== Offers as evidence of value ===
Unaccepted offers to purchase are generally not recognised by courts for the purpose of proving the value of the proposed purchase. In the US case of Sharp v. United States (1903), a New Jersey landowner, Sharp, argued that the value of his land which had been taken by the government for fortification and defence purposes had been underestimated, and he sought to put forward examples of "different offers he had received to purchase the property for hotel, residential, or amusement purposes, or for a ferry, or a railroad terminal, or to lease the property for hotel purposes". The trial court (the District Court of New Jersey), the Court of Appeals for the Third Circuit and the Supreme Court all affirmed that such evidence was to be rejected, citing evidence from a number of previous cases which had established the same principle. Offers to purchase are considered to suffer "inherent unreliability for this purpose".

== Acceptance ==
A promise or act on the part of an offeree indicating a willingness to be bound by the terms and conditions contained in an offer. Also, the acknowledgment of the drawee that binds the drawee to the terms of a draft.

=== Test of acceptance ===
Acceptance is judged by an objective standard, based on the conduct of the offeree. The requirement of an objective perspective is important in cases where a party claims that an offer was not accepted and seeks to take advantage of the performance of the other party. Here, we can apply the test of whether a reasonable bystander (a "fly on the wall") would have perceived that the party has impliedly accepted the offer by conduct.

Some people have argued that the old common law rule used a subjective perspective. Under this meeting of the minds theory of contract, a party could resist a claim of breach by proving that he had not intended to be bound by the agreement. This is unsatisfactory, as one party has no way to know another's undisclosed intentions. One party can only act upon what the other party reveals objectively (Lucy V Zehmer, 196 Va 493 84 S.E. 2d 516) to be his intent. Hence, an actual meeting of the minds is not required. Indeed, it has been argued that the "meeting of the minds" idea is entirely a modern error: 19th century judges spoke of consensus ad idem, which modern teachers have wrongly translated as "meeting of minds" but actually means "agreement to the [same] thing".

=== Rules of acceptance ===
Common law contracts are accepted under a "mirror image" rule. Under this rule, an acceptance must be an absolute and unqualified acceptance of all the terms of the offer. If there is any variation, even on an unimportant point, between the offer and the terms of its acceptance, there is no contract. In the United States, the Uniform Commercial Code provides for acceptance even when terms of the acceptance differ from terms of the offer. This might occur, for example, when a buyer's "Terms and Conditions" differ from a seller's "Terms and Conditions" yet both parties behave as if a contract exists. In this case, a complex series of rules known as "Battle of the Forms" evaluates what is included in the contract. These rules might require, for instance, that conflicting terms in the offer and acceptance are "knocked out" and replaced by default language provided in the Code.

An acceptance is only contractually valid if the proposal to which response is made is an offer capable of acceptance. In an Appeal Court ruling in 2020, Sir John Chadwick, judge, accepted the argument put by the appellant in the case, drawing:

a distinction between the court's task when seeking to ascertain the parties' intention under the terms of a contract which both accept has been made and the court's task when seeking to determine whether or not a contract has been made at all. In the former case the question is "what did the parties intend by the words used in the agreement which they made": in the latter, the questions are (i) "was there an [sic] proposal (or "offer") made by one party which was capable of being accepted by the other" and, if so, (ii) "was that proposal accepted by the party to whom it was made".

==== Communication of acceptance ====
There are several rules dealing with the communication of acceptance:

- The acceptance must be communicated. Theisger LJ said in Household Fire and Carriage that "an acceptance which remains in the breast of the acceptor without being actually and by legal implication communicated to the offeror, is no binding acceptance". Prior to acceptance, an offer may be withdrawn.
- As acceptance must be communicated, the offeror cannot include an Acceptance by Silence clause. This was affirmed in Felthouse v Bindley, here an uncle made an offer to buy his nephew's horse, saying that if he did not hear anything else he would "consider the horse mine". This did not stand up in court, and it was decided there could not be acceptance by silence.
- An exception exists in the case of unilateral contracts, in which the offeror makes an offer to the world which can be accepted by some act. A classic instance of this is the case of Carlill v. Carbolic Smoke Ball Co. [1893] 2 Q.B. 484 in which an offer was made to pay £100 to anyone who having bought the offeror's product and used it in accordance with the instructions nonetheless contracted influenza. The plaintiff who was Mrs Carlill bought the smoke ball and used it according to the instructions but she contracted influenza. She sued the Carbolic Smoke Ball Co. for £100. The court held that the inconvenience she went through by performing the act amounted to acceptance and therefore ordered £100 to be given to Mrs. Carlill. Her actions accepted the offer - there was no need to communicate acceptance. Typical cases of unilateral offers are advertisements of rewards (e.g., for the return of a lost dog).
- An offer can only be accepted by the offeree, that is, the person to whom the offer is made.
- An offeree is not usually bound if another person accepts the offer on their behalf without his authorization, the exceptions to which are found in the law of agency, where an agent may have apparent or ostensible authority, or the usual authority of an agent in the particular market, even if the principal did not realize what the extent of this authority was, and someone on whose behalf an offer has been purportedly accepted may also ratify the contract within a reasonable time, binding both parties: see agent (law).
- It may be implied from the construction of the contract that the offeror has dispensed with the requirement of communication of acceptance (called waiver of communication - which is generally implied in unilateral contracts).
- If the offer specifies a method of acceptance (such as by post or fax), acceptance must be by a method that is no less effective from the offeror's point of view than the method specified. The exact method prescribed may have to be used in some cases but probably only where the offeror has used very explicit words such as "by registered post, and by that method only".
- However, acceptance may be inferred from conduct.

==== Correspondence ====
A mere request for information about the terms of the offer is not a counter-offer and leaves the offer intact. It may be possible to draft an enquiry such that it adds to the terms of the contract while keeping the original offer alive.

Under the Uniform Commercial Code (UCC) Section. 2-207(1), a definite expression of acceptance or a written confirmation of an informal agreement may constitute a valid acceptance even if it states terms additional to or different from the offer or informal agreement. The additional or different terms are treated as proposals for addition into the contract under UCC Sec. 2-207(2). Between merchants, such terms become part of the contract unless:

- a) the offer expressly limits acceptance to the terms of the offer,
- b) material alteration of the contract results,
- c) notification of objection to the additional/different terms are given in a reasonable time after notice of them is received.

Material is defined as anything that may cause undue hardship/surprise, or is a significant element of the contract.

If there is no contract under 2-207(1), then under UCC Sec. 2-207(3), conduct by the parties that recognize there is a contract may be sufficient to establish a contract. The terms for this contract include only those that the parties agree on and the rest via gap fillers.

=== Battle of the forms ===
Often when two companies deal with each other in the course of business, they will use standard form contracts. Often these standard forms contain terms which conflict (e.g. both parties include a liability waiver in their form). The "battle of the forms" refers to the resulting legal dispute arising where both parties accept that a legally binding contract exists, but disagree about whose standard terms apply. Such disputes may be resolved by reference to the "last document rule", i.e. whichever business sent the last document, or "fired the last shot" (often the seller's delivery note) is held to have issued the final offer and the buyer's organisation is held to have accepted the offer by signing the delivery note or simply accepting and using the delivered goods.

In U.S. law, this principle is referred to as the last shot rule.

Under English law, the question was raised in Butler Machine Tool Co Ltd v Ex-Cell-O Corporation (England) Ltd, as to which of the standard form contracts prevailed in the transaction. Lord Denning MR preferred the view that the documents were to be considered as a whole, and the important factor was finding the decisive document; on the other hand, Lawton and Bridge LJJ preferred traditional offer-acceptance analysis, and considered that the last counter-offer prior to the beginning of performance voided all preceding offers. The absence of any additional counter-offer or refusal by the other party is understood as an implied acceptance.

In Leicester Circuits Ltd. v. Coates Brothers plc (2002) and GHSP Incorporated v AB Electronic Ltd (2010) the English High Court has found that companies may have not agreed on any terms, and so the "last document rule" may not apply. In the ruling case, because of a "clear lack of consensus" (paragraph 46), there was no situation where one company could have been said to have accepted the other's standard terms, as they remained in unresolved dispute. The court held that neither party's terms applied and therefore the contract was governed by the implied terms of the UK Sale of Goods Act 1979. Lawyer Robert Burrows comments that "it is becoming increasingly apparent" that in current "Battle of the Forms" cases, "neither party's standard terms and conditions will apply unless it can be shown that one party was aware of and agreed to contract on [the other party's] terms".

=== Postal Rule ===
As a rule of convenience, if the offer is accepted by post, the contract comes into existence at the moment that the acceptance was posted. This rule only applies when, impliedly or explicitly, the parties have post in contemplation as a means of acceptance. It excludes contracts involving land, letters incorrectly addressed and instantaneous modes of communication. The relevance of this early 19th century rule to modern conditions, when many quicker means of communication are available has been questioned, but the rule remains good law for the time being.

==== Knowledge of the offer ====
In Australian law, there is a requirement that an acceptance is made in reliance or pursuance of an offer.

=== Rejection of an offer or lapse of time ===
An offer can be terminated on the grounds of rejection by the offeree, that is if the offeree does not accept the terms of the offer or makes a counter-offer as referred to above.

Also, upon making an offer, an offeror may include the period in which the offer will be available: an invitation to tender will often specify a "tender validity period" during which a buyer intends offers to be kept open for assessment and evaluation before acceptance. If the offeree fails to accept the offer within this specific period, then the offer will be deemed as terminated. An offer may also be revoked by operation of law, if an unreasonable amount of time has passed between offer and acceptance.

==== Death of offeror ====
Generally death (or incapacity) of the offeror terminates the offer. This does not apply to option contracts, in which the there is a possibility in which the next of kin or an assigned friend of the offeror can take his or her place after death.

The offer cannot be accepted if the offeree knows of the death of the offeror. In cases where the offeree accepts in ignorance of the death, the contract may still be valid, although this proposition depends on the nature of the offer. If the contract involves some characteristic personal to the offeror, the offer is destroyed by the death.

== Time of contract formation ==
A contract will be formed (assuming the other requirements for a legally binding contract are met) when the parties give objective manifestation of an intent to form the contract.

Because offer and acceptance are necessarily intertwined, in California (US), offer and acceptance are analyzed together as subelements of a single element, known either as consent of the parties or mutual assent. Under the Uniform Commercial Code, offer and acceptance are not essential, and the timing of contract formation need not be clear for a contract to exist. Scholars have pointed out that many contracts are not in fact formed by offer and acceptance, and they have critiqued and reanalyzed the doctrine.

== See also ==
- 1911 Encyclopædia Britannica definition of Acceptance
- Bataille des conditions générales (The Battle of the Forms in France)
- Harris v Nickerson
- Implied in fact contract
- Last shot rule
- Proposal (business)
- Wolf v Forfar Potato Co
