= Wolf v Forfar Potato Co =

Scottish contract case law

Wolf and Wolf v Forfar Potato Co (1984 S.L.T. 100) is a leading case in Scots contract law. It deals with offer and acceptance, more specifically with the effects a counter offer has on the existence of a contract.

The case itself concerns the possible sale of potatoes by a Forfar potato merchant to an international potato merchant in Amsterdam, on 29 November 1977. The Forfar merchant telexed an offer (open for acceptance till 17.00 hrs., 30 November 1977) to sell potatoes to the international merchant, subject to certain conditions regarding delivery dates and sizes. By telex dated 30 November 1977, the international merchant purported to accept the offer, subject to certain additional conditions. Following a telephone conversation between the parties to clarify the position, the international merchant by further telex dated 30 November 1977, sent within the time-limit, again purported to accept the original offer but requested that their conditions telexed in their first telex should be given consideration. The Forfar merchant did not supply the potatoes and was sued for damages. The question arose as to whether there was a valid contract with consensus in idem ever constituted between the parties.

The sheriff after a proof before answer, held that

1. there was no contract between the parties, and
2. the pursuers failed to prove any loss.

The pursuers appealed to the Court of Session where it was held that on the making of a qualified acceptance and counter-offer, the original offer falls and that on the failure to obtain the terms requested in the counter-offer, the party cannot fall back on and accept the original offer.
