= Smart v HM Advocate =

Scottish law case

- Court: High Court of Justiciary
- Decided: 24 January 1975
- Citation: 1975 JC 30, 1975 SLT 65

Court membership
- Judges sitting: Lord Justice Clerk Lord Wheatley, Lord Leechman, Lord Thomson

Smart v Her Majesty's Advocate 1975 JC 30 is a Scots criminal law case relating to consent as a defence to assault. The High Court of Justiciary held that if the assault was made with an evil intent, consent could not negate it.

The case saw the accused, William Smart, who was charged with assault, lodging the defence that his victim Issac Wilkie has consented to a "square go". Therefore Smart could not be charged with assaulting Wilkie or any injuries arising from the fight.

== Facts ==
Smart was originally tried in Paisley Sheriff Court in 1974 by Sheriff McLean and a jury. Smart put forward his two-line argument. First, the victim agreed to fight him and knew the risks and consequences, so he should not be charged with assault. Second, he claimed he acted in self-defense. but was dismissed for lack of evidence. The only question remaining was whether consent precludes (denies) an attack.

== Ruling ==
The sheriff ruled that:

"Now something has been said about consent. I direct you in law that consent—if you in fact were to find that Wilkie had consented in some way to this assault—then that would not be a defence … if the act is criminal it cannot lose its criminal character because the victim consented, and the reason is not far to seek. "

Smart was found guilty of assault by the jury and sentenced to detention for a period of three months. Smart chose to appeal this decision claiming consent was a defence to a charge of assault on the grounds that both men had chosen to fight without weapons in similar conditions to a boxing match. Smart relied on a passage from Gordon, Criminal Law at page 773, which stated:

"If A and B decide to fight each other they cannot be guilty of assaulting each other, so long as neither exceeds the degree of violence consented to or permitted by law."

The appeal was heard on 24 January 1975 in the High court of justiciary, who on appeal held that it was not a defence to a criminal charge of assault that the injuries had been caused in the course of a consensual fight. The court held that:

"it is in the public interest that it should be decided and made known that consent to a 'square go' is not a defence to a charge of assault based on that agreed combat."

The situation was different from indecent acts or injuries caused in the course of organised sports, such as boxing.

== See also ==
- Operation Spanner
