= Firm offer =

Offer open for a defined time

A firm offer is an offer that will remain open for a certain period or until a certain time or occurrence of a certain event, during which it is incapable of being revoked. As a general rule, all offers are revocable at any time prior to acceptance, even those offers that purport to be irrevocable on their face.

In the United States, an exception is the merchant firm offer rule set out in Uniform Commercial Code - § 2-205, which states that an offer is firm and irrevocable if it is an offer to buy or sell goods made by a merchant and it is in writing and signed by the offeror. Such an offer is irrevocable even in the absence of consideration. If no time is stated, it is irrevocable for a reasonable time, but in no event may a period of irrevocability exceed three months. Any such term of assurance in a form supplied by the offeree must be separately signed by the offeror.

However, even when the period of irrevocability expires, the offer may still remain open until revoked or rejected according to the general rules regarding termination of an offer.

If the offeree rejects, fails to accept the terms of the offer, fixed or otherwise, or makes a counter-offer, then the original offer is terminated.

== See also ==
- Uniform Commercial Code
- United Nations Convention on Contracts for the International Sale of Goods
- Option (finance)
