= Brennan v HM Advocate =

- Court: High Court of Justiciary (sitting as the Court of Criminal Appeal)
- Decided: 24 January 1975
- Citation: 1977 JC 38, 1977 SLT 151

Court membership
- Judges sitting: Lord Justice General Lord Emslie, Lord Justice Clerk Lord Wheatley, Lords Cameron, Kissen, Avonside, Thomson and Ross

Brennan v HM Advocate 1977 JC 38 was a Scots criminal appeal case decided in the High Court of Justiciary in its capacity as the Court of Criminal Appeal. The case set the precedent that voluntary intoxication, whether by drink or drugs, cannot be used to establish defences of automatism or insanity.

Brennan had been convicted of murdering his father during a state of intoxication. This was held not to qualify as automatism as the appelant had entered this state voluntarily. The Court-based this reasoning on a number of passages from the work of Baron Hume, one of the institutional writers.

It was also held insufficient to meet the requirements of the special defence of insanity. Lord Justice General Lord Emslie stated:

"In the law of Scotland a person who voluntarily and deliberately consumes known intoxicants, including drink or drugs, of whatever quantity, for their intoxicating effects, whether these effects are fully foreseen or not, cannot rely on the resulting intoxication as the foundation of a special defence of insanity at the time nor, indeed, can he plead diminished responsibility."

The defendant's appeal against conviction for murder was refused.
