= Corroborating evidence =

Type of evidence in law

Corroborating evidence, also referred to as corroboration, is a type of evidence in lawful command.

== Types and uses ==
Corroborating evidence tends to support a proposition that is already supported by some initial evidence, therefore confirming the proposition. For example, W, a witness, testifies that she saw X drive his automobile into a green car. Meanwhile, Y, another witness, corroborates the proposition by testifying that when he examined X's car, later that day, he noticed green paint on its fender. There can also be corroborating evidence related to a certain source, such as what makes an author think a certain way due to the evidence that was supplied by witnesses or objects.

Another type of corroborating evidence comes from using the Baconian method, i.e., the method of agreement, method of difference, and method of concomitant variations.

These methods are followed in experimental design. They were codified by Francis Bacon, and developed further by John Stuart Mill and consist of controlling several variables, in turn, to establish which variables are causally connected. These principles are widely used intuitively in various kinds of proofs, demonstrations, and investigations, in addition to being fundamental to experimental design.

In law, corroboration refers to the requirement in some jurisdictions, such as in Scots law, that any evidence adduced be backed up by at least one other source (see Corroboration in Scots law).

== An example of corroboration ==
Defendant says, "It was like what he/she (a witness) said but...". This is Corroborative evidence from the defendant that the evidence the witness gave is true and correct.

Corroboration is not needed in certain instances. For example, there are certain statutory exceptions. In the Education (Scotland) Act, it is only necessary to produce a register as proof of lack of attendance. No further evidence is needed.

== England and Wales ==
Perjury

See section 13 of the Perjury Act 1911.

Speeding offences

See section 89(2) of the Road Traffic Regulation Act 1984.

Sexual offences

See section 32 of the Criminal Justice and Public Order Act 1994.

Confessions by mentally handicapped persons

See section 77 of the Police and Criminal Evidence Act 1984.

Evidence of children

See section 34 of the Criminal Justice Act 1988.

Evidence of accomplices

See section 32 of the Criminal Justice and Public Order Act 1994.

== See also ==
- Karl Popper
