= Cadder v HM Advocate =

- Court: Supreme Court of the United Kingdom
- Full case name: Cadder v Her Majesty's Advocate
- Decided: 26 October 2010
- Citations: [2010] UKSC 43, 2011 S.C. (U.K.S.C.) 13

Case history
- Related action: McLean v HM Advocate 2010 SLT 73

Court membership
- Judges sitting: Lord Hope (Deputy President), Lords Rodger, Walker, Brown, Mance, Kerr and Dyson

Case opinions
- By not being able to have access to a solicitor prior to being interviewed by the police, Cadder's rights under Article 6(1) ECHR had been breached.

Cadder v HM Advocate [2010] UKSC 43 (26 October 2010) is a decision in which the Supreme Court of the United Kingdom held that the way in which police in Scotland detained suspects was not compatible with the European Convention on Human Rights and was therefore unlawful in terms of the Scotland Act 1998.

== Background ==
Peter Cadder was convicted at Glasgow Sheriff Court of assault and breach of the peace on 29 May 2009, following an incident in May 2007, at which time he was a minor.

Cadder had been detained under section 14(1) of the Criminal Procedure (Scotland) Act 1995 and interviewed by two officers from Strathclyde Police at London Road Police Office in Glasgow. In August 2008 an identity parade was held at which the complainer, John Tacey, was unable to identify anyone. In the subsequent court case the Crown relied upon evidence obtained within Cadder's police interview to help to prove their case.

== Judgment ==
=== Court of Appeal ===
Cadder attempted to lodge an appeal in the Court of Criminal Appeal in Edinburgh on the grounds that it was a breach of Article 6(1) (Right to a Fair Trial) of the European Convention on Human Rights (ECHR) that he was unable to have a solicitor present during his police interview. At the first sift stage a High Court judge refused his appeal on the basis of the full-bench decision in McLean v HM Advocate ([2010] SLT 73), which had concluded that there were sufficient safeguards within Scots Law to ensure that there was no breach of Article 6(1) in having no solicitor present. Cadder appealed against the refusal and three judges refused it again in November 2009 at the second sift stage.

Cadder then sought leave to appeal to the Supreme Court of the United Kingdom. This was refused as the Criminal Appeals Administration Judge was of the view that the refusal of the earlier attempts to appeal did not amount to a determination of a devolution minute. Cadder then sought special leave to appeal directly to the Supreme Court. It was asked to consider whether Cadder was able to obtain special leave to appeal; matters surrounding his identification; and also matters relating to there being no right to have a consultation with a solicitor before an interview by the police.

The leading authority in this area of law is Salduz v Turkey 36391/02 2008 ECHR 1542 a judgment of the European Court of Human Rights sitting as a Grand Chamber. The basic facts of the case are similar to Cadder, but Salduz had challenged on the ground that his "confession" (later retracted) had been given under duress, due to maltreatment during interrogation. It was held that Salduz's self-incriminating statements, made while detained, which formed a part of the evidence used to convict him, were not admissible because of the absence of a lawyer. The Grand Chamber in Salduz v Turkey held (para 55) that in order for the right to a fair trial to remain "practical and effective" Article 6 of the European Convention on Human Rights requires that, as a rule, access to a lawyer should be provided from the first interrogation, unless compelling reasons exist otherwise. Even so, such restrictions must not unduly prejudice the rights of the accused under Article 6. There will be irretrievable prejudice when incriminating statements made during interrogation without a lawyer present are used for a conviction [Salduz: Para 55].

The appellants in both Cadder and Salduz were minors, to whom procedural protections generally apply across many jurisdictions (see e.g. s14(1) Criminal Procedure (Scotland) Act 1995 – under which Cadder was held.)

=== Supreme Court ===
The Supreme Court held that Cadder's rights under Article 6(1) of the ECHR had been breached because he had been denied access to a solicitor before he was interviewed by the police.

== Significance ==
Scottish police can no longer question suspects without offering the suspect a private consultation with a lawyer, not only before an interview but also at any time during the interview at the suspect's request.

The period of detention without charge was raised from six hours to twelve hours, but it will be possible to increase the period to twenty-four hours on "cause shown" by a senior officer.

Many cases being prosecuted that relied upon section 14 admissions to satisfy the requirements of corroboration have fallen or have been successfully appealed as a result of the Cadder decision.

== See also ==
- Corroboration in Scots law
- Pre-trial rights of the accused in Scots law
