= Restatement (Second) of Contracts =

Widely cited American legal treatise

The Restatement of the Law Second, Contracts is a legal treatise from the second series of the Restatements of the Law, and seeks to inform judges and lawyers about general principles of contract common law. It is one of the best-recognized and frequently cited legal treatises in all of American jurisprudence. Every first-year law student in the United States is exposed to it, and it is a frequently cited non-binding authority in all of U.S. common law in the areas of contracts and commercial transactions. The American Law Institute began work on the second edition in 1962 and completed it in 1979; the version in use at present has a copyright year of 1981.

== Use and commentary ==
Legal scholars and jurists have commented extensively on the Restatement, both in contrasting it with aspects of the first Restatement, and in evaluating its influence and effectiveness in reaching its stated objectives. It is in this context of direct review that one can find numerous arguments both favoring and criticizing some aspects of the Restatement as an independent source of legal scholarship.

Although several sections of the Restatement contained new rules which sometimes contradicted existing law, courts citing these sections have predominantly adopted the Restatement's view, citing them as a court would cite statute or code.

Far more common, however, is the practice of citing the Restatement to clarify generally accepted doctrine in every major area of contract and commercial law. It is in this context of legal research that one can find the Restatement used as direct substantiation and persuasive authority, to validate the arguments and interpretations of individual legal practitioners.

== Legacy ==
Although the Restatement of Contracts is still an influential academic work, certain aspects have been superseded in everyday legal practice by the Uniform Commercial Code. Specifically, the UCC has replaced the Restatement (Second) of Contracts in regard to the sale of goods. The Restatement (Second) of Contracts remains the unofficial authority for aspects of contract law which find their genesis in the common law principles of the United States and, previously, England.

== See also ==
- Arthur Linton Corbin, first reporter
- Corpus Juris Secundum
