= Partridge v Crittenden =

English legal case of 1968

Partridge v. Crittenden
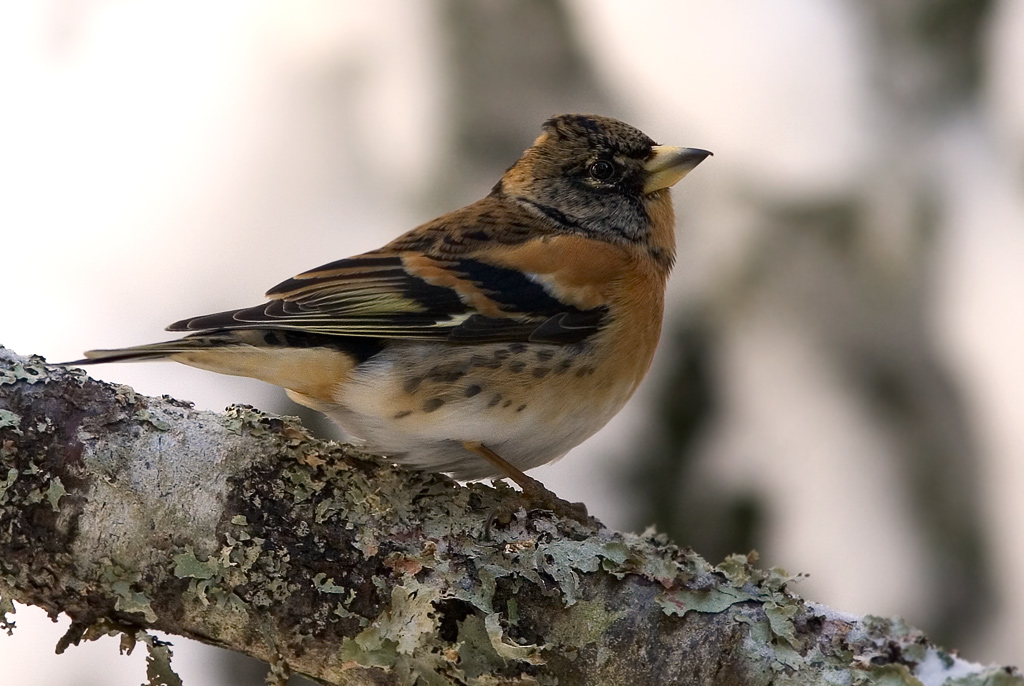
- A male brambling, the species central to the case
- Court: Queen's Bench Division
- Full case name: Arthur Robert Partridge v. Anthony Ian Crittenden
- Decided: 5 April 1968
- Citation: [1968] 1 WLR 1204; [1968] 2 All ER 421;(1968) 132 JP 367; (1968) 112 SJ 582
- Cases cited: Fisher v. Bell [1961] 1 QB 394; Grainger & Son v. Gough (Surveyor of Taxes) [1896] AC 325; Mella v. Monahan [1961] Crim. LR 175 (DC)
- Legislation cited: Protection of Birds Act 1954 s. 6 Protection of Birds Act 1957 Sch 4

Court membership
- Judges sitting: Lord Parker, CJ, Ashworth and Blain, JJ

Keywords
- Bird Conservation; Offer and acceptance; Invitation to treat; Advertisement

Partridge v Crittenden [1968] 1 WLR 1204 is an English legal case which was heard by a divisional court of the Queen's Bench Division of the High Court of England and Wales on appeal from Chester magistrates' court, and is well known (amongst other cases) for establishing the legal precedent in English contract law that advertisements are usually considered to be invitations to treat.

== Facts ==
This case was a case stated by the magistrates' court sitting at the Castle in Chester on 19 July 1967.

On 13 April 1967 an advertisement by the appellant (Arthur Robert Partridge) appeared in the periodical "Cage and Aviary Birds", under the general heading "Classified Advertisements" which contained, amongst others, the words "Quality British A.B.C.R. ... Bramblefinch cocks, Bramblefinch hens 25 s. each". In no place was there any direct use of the words "offer for sale". A Thomas Shaw Thompson wrote to Partridge asking him to send him an ABCR ("aviary bred, close ringed") bramblefinch hen and enclosed a cheque for 30s. On 1 May 1967, Partridge dispatched a brambling, which was wearing a closed ring around its leg, to Thompson in a box. Thompson received the box and was able to remove the ring from the bird's leg without injuring it.

Partridge was charged by Anthony Ian Crittenden, on behalf of the RSPCA, with illegally offering for sale a live wild bird which was not a close-ringed specimen, bred in captivity, contrary to s. 6(1) and Sch. 4 of the Protection of Birds Act 1954. The magistrates decided that the advertisement was an offer for sale and that the bramblefinch hen was not a close-ringed specimen bred in captivity, because it was possible to remove the ring from the bird's leg.

Partridge was convicted, was fined £5 and ordered to pay £5 5s advocate's fee and £4 9s. 6d. witnesses' expenses.

Partridge appealed against conviction.

== Relevant law ==
Section 6(1) of the Protection of Birds Act 1954 states:

If ... any person sells, offers for sale ... (a) any live wild bird... including in Schedule 4 to this Act of a species which is resident in or visits the British Isles in a wild state, other than a close-ringed specimen bred in captivity; ... he shall be guilty of an offence ...

Schedule 4 of the Act has the heading "Wild birds which may not be sold alive unless close-ringed and bred in captivity" and amongst the names in the schedule is "brambling".

== Judgment ==
The High Court had to answer whether the appellant's advertisement constituted a legitimate offer for sale (as the prosecution chose to prosecute only for the weaker of the three possible alleged facts), and whether the bird was not a close-ringed specimen bred in captivity under the Protection of Birds Act 1954 if it were possible to remove the ring from its leg. It was held that the advertisement in question constituted in law an invitation to treat and not an offer to sell; therefore the offence with which the appellant was charged was not established. The judges also said that if the only issue were whether the bird was a close-ringed specimen under the Protection of Birds Act 1954, the magistrates' judgment would have been upheld. Ashworth J gave his judgment first.

This is an appeal by way of case stated from a decision of Chester justices. On July 19, 1967, they heard an information preferred by the prosecutor on behalf of the RSPCA alleging against the appellant that he did unlawfully offer for sale a certain live wild bird, to wit a brambling, being a bird included in schedule 4 to the Protection of Birds Act 1954, of a species which is resident in or visits the British Isles in a wild state, other than a close-ringed specimen bred in captivity, contrary to section 6, subsection (1) of the Act.

The case arose because in a periodical known as "Cage and Aviary Birds", the issue for April 13, 1967, there appeared an advertisement inserted by the appellant containing, inter alia, the words "Quality British A.B.C.R. ... bramblefinch cocks, bramblefinch hens, 25s each." In the case stated the full advertisement is not set out, but by the agreement of counsel this court has seen a copy of the issue in question, and what is perhaps to be noted in passing is that on the page there is a whole list of different birds under the general heading of "Classified Advertisements". In no place, so far as I can see, is there any direct use of the words "Offers for sale". I ought to say I am not for my part deciding that that would have the result of making this judgment any different, but at least it strengthens the case for the appellant that there is no such expression on the page. Having seen that advertisement, Mr. Thompson wrote to the appellant and asked for a hen and enclosed a cheque for 30s. A hen, according to the case, was sent to him on May 1, 1967, which was wearing a closed-ring, and he received it on May 2. The box was opened by Mr. Thompson in the presence of the prosecutor, and the case finds that Mr. Thompson was able to remove the ring without injury to the bird, and even taking into account that the bird had travelled from Leicester in a box on the railway, its condition was rough, it was extremely nervous, it had no perching sense at all and its plumage was rough.

Stopping there, the inference from that finding is that the justices were taking the view, or could take the view, that from its appearance, at any rate, this was not such a bird as a person can legitimately sell within the Act of 1954. The case goes on to find:

"The expression 'close-ringed' is nowhere defined nor is there any universally recommended size ring for a bramble finch... (g) The ring is placed on the bird's leg at the age of three to 10 days at which time it is not possible to determine what the eventual girth of the bird's leg will be."

Having been referred to the decision of this court in Fisher v. Bell the justices nonetheless took the view that the advertisement did constitute an offer for sale; they went on further to find that the bird was not a close-ringed specimen bred in captivity, because it was possible to remove the ring. Before this court Mr. Pitchers for the appellant, has taken two points, first, this was not an offer for sale and, secondly, that the justices' reason for finding that it was not a close-ringed bird was plainly wrong because the fact that one could remove the ring did not render it a non-close-ringed bird.

It is convenient, perhaps, to deal with the question of the ring first. For my part I confess I was in ignorance, and in some state of confusion, as to the real meaning and effect of this particular phrase in the section, and I express my indebtedness to Mr. Havers, for the prosecutor, for having made the matter, as far as I am concerned, perfectly clear. I would say if one was looking for a definition of the phrase "close-ringed" it means ringed by a complete ring, which is not capable of being forced apart or broken except, of course, with the intention of damaging it. I contrast a closed-ring of that sort – it might take the form, I suppose, of an elastic band or of a metal circle ring – with the type of ring which sometimes exists which is made into a ring when a tongue is placed through a slot and then drawn back; that is a ring which can be undone and is not close-ringed. In this case what is contemplated, according to Mr. Havers, and I accept it, is that with a young bird of this sort between three and ten days after hatching a closed-ring of the type described is forced over its claws, which are obviously brought together so as to admit the passage of the ring, and it is then permanently on or around the bird's leg, and as it grows, it would be impossible to take that ring off because the claws and the like would have rendered a repetition of the earlier manoeuvre impossible.

Therefore, approaching the matter this way, I can well understand how the justices came to the conclusion that this was not a close-ringed specimen, because they could take the ring off. If that were the only issue, I should not find any difficulty in upholding their decision. But the real point of substance in this case arose from the words "offer for sale", and it is to be noted in section 6 of the Act of 1954 that the operative words are "any person sells, offers for sale or has in his possession for sale". For some reason which Mr. Havers for the prosecutor has not been able to explain, those responsible for the prosecution in this case chose, out of the trio of possible offences, the one which could not succeed. There was a sale here, in my view, because Mr. Thompson sent his cheque and the bird was sent in reply; and a completed sale. On the evidence there was also a plain case of the appellant having in possession for sale this particular bird. But they chose to prosecute him for offering for sale, and they relied on the advertisement.

A similar point arose before this court in 1960 dealing, it is true, with a different statute but with the same words, in Fisher v. Bell. The relevant words of section 1 (1) of the Restriction of Offensive Weapons Act 1959, in that case were: "Any person who ... offers for sale. ... (a) any knife. ..." Lord Parker CJ, in giving judgment said:

"The sole question is whether the exhibition of that knife in the window with the ticket constituted an offer for sale within the statute. I confess that I think that most lay people and, indeed, I myself when I first read the papers, would be inclined to the view that to say that if a knife was displayed in a window like that with a price attached to it was not offering it for sale was just nonsense. In ordinary language it is there inviting people to buy it, and it is for sale; but any statute must of course be looked at in the light of the general law of the country."

The words are the same here "offer for sale", and in my judgment the law of the country is equally plain as it was in regard to articles in a shop window, namely that the insertion of an advertisement in the form adopted here under the title "Classified Advertisements" is simply an invitation to treat.

That is really sufficient to dispose of this case. I should perhaps in passing observe that the editors of the publication Criminal Law Review had an article dealing with Fisher v. Bell in which a way round that decision was at least contemplated, suggesting that while there might be one meaning of the phrase "offer for sale" in the law of contract, a criminal court might take a stricter view, particularly having in mind the purpose of the Act, in Fisher v. Bell the stocking of flick knives, and in this case the selling of wild birds. But for my part that is met entirely by the quotation which appears in Lord Parker's judgment in Fisher v. Bell, that "It appears to me to be a naked usurpation of the legislative function under the thin disguise of interpretation."

I would allow this appeal and quash the conviction.

Lord Parker CJ said the following.

I agree and with less reluctance than in Fisher v. Bell, and Mella v. Monahan I say "with less reluctance" because I think when one is dealing with advertisements and circulars, unless they indeed come from manufacturers, there is business sense in their being construed as invitations to treat and not offers for sale. In a very different context in Grainger & Son v. Gough Lord Herschell said dealing with a price-list:

"The transmission of such a price-list does not amount to an offer to supply an unlimited quantity of the wine described at the price named, so that as soon as an order is given there is a binding contract to supply that quantity. If it were so, the merchant might find himself involved in any number of contractual obligations to supply wine of a particular description which he would be quite unable to carry out, his stock of wine of that description being necessarily limited."

It seems to me accordingly that not only is it the law but common sense supports it.

Blain J concurred.

== See also ==
- Contract
- Offer and acceptance
- Invitation to treat
- Carlill v Carbolic Smoke Ball Company
- Pharmaceutical Society of Great Britain v Boots Cash Chemists (Southern) Ltd
