= Harris v Nickerson =

English contract law case

- Court: High Court, Queen's Bench
- Decided: 25 April 1873
- Citation: (1873) LR 8 QB 286

Court membership
- Judges sitting: Blackburn, Quain and Archibald, JJ.

Keywords
- Contract, offer, auction, withdrawal of goods, mere declaration

Harris v Nickerson (1873) LR 8 QB 286 is an English law case concerning the requirements of offer and acceptance in the formation of a contract. The case established that an advertisement that goods will be put up for auction does not constitute an offer to any person that the goods will actually be put up, and that the advertiser is therefore free to withdraw the goods from the auction at any time prior to the auction. All three judges concurred but issued separate judgments.

== Facts ==
The Defendant placed an advertisement in London papers that certain items, including brewing equipment and office furniture, would be placed up for auction over three days in Bury St. Edmunds. The Plaintiff obtained a commission to buy the office furniture and expended time and expense to travel to Bury St. Edmunds to bid for the office furniture. On the third day, the lots for the office furniture were withdrawn. The Plaintiff sued for loss of time and expense. The judge at first instance found in favor of the plaintiff. Leave was given to appeal to the High Court .

The Plaintiff submitted that the advertisement constituted a contract between themselves and the Defendant that the latter would sell the furniture according to the conditions stated in the advertisement, and that accordingly the withdrawal of the furniture was a breach of contract. The Defendant submitted the advertisement of a sale that did not constitute a contract that any particular lot or class of lots would actually be put up for sale.

== Judgment ==
The court held unanimously that the advertisement did not constitute an offer but rather was a mere declaration of intent. Blackburn, J., founded his judgment on public policy grounds, calling it a "startling proposition" that "anyone who advertises a sale by publishing an advertisement is now responsible to everybody who attends the sale for his cab hire or travelling expenses."

Quain and Archibald, JJ., also drew public policy arguments, emphasizing that there existed no authority on which to base a decision that the Defendant is liable to indemnify all those who attended his auction. The court upheld the appeal.

== See also ==
- Contract
- Offer and acceptance
- Auction
- Payne v Cave 3 TR 148
- Warlow v. Harrison, 1 E&E 295, 309, 28 LJ 18, auction without reserve
- Mainprice v Westley 6 B&S 420; 34 LJ (QB) 229
- Williams v Carwardine 4 B&Ad 621
- Spencer v Harding Law Rep 5 CP 561
- Barry v Davies
