= Fisher v Bell =

English contract law case

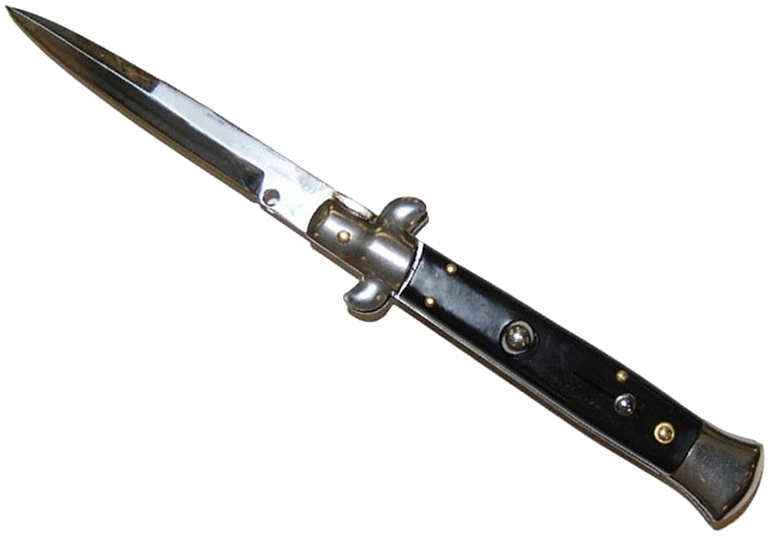
- Court: Divisional Court
- Decided: 10 November 1960
- Citation: [1961] 1 QB 394, [1960] 3 All ER 731

Keywords
- Contract, offer, invitation to treat, display of goods for sale, shop window, offensive weapons

Fisher v Bell [1961] 1 QB 394 is an English contract law case concerning the requirements of offer and acceptance in the formation of a contract. The case established that, where goods are displayed in a shop, such display is treated as an invitation to treat by the seller, and not a contractual offer. The offer is instead made when the customer presents the item to the cashier together with payment. Acceptance occurs at the point the cashier takes payment.

== Facts ==
The defendant displayed a flick knife in the window of his shop next to a ticket bearing the words Ejector knife – 4s, (i.e. four shillings).

Under section 1 of the Restriction of Offensive Weapons Act 1959 (which was expanded in 1961, after this case finished, to deal with the gap in the law):

(1) Any person who manufactures, sells or hires or offers for sale or hire, or lends or gives to any other person—

(a) any knife which has a blade which opens automatically by hand pressure applied to a button, spring or other device in or attached to the handle of the knife, sometimes known as a “flick knife” or “flick gun”; or
(b) any knife which has a blade which is released from the handle or sheath thereof by the force of gravity or the application of centrifugal force and which, when released, is locked in place by means of a button, spring, lever, or other device, sometimes known as a “gravity knife”

shall be guilty of an offence ... and in the case of a second or subsequent offence to imprisonment for a term not exceeding six months or to a fine not exceeding...or to both such imprisonment and fine.

(2) The importation of any such knife as is described in the foregoing subsection is hereby prohibited.

In late 1959, the claimant, a chief inspector of police, brought an information against the defendant alleging he contravened section 1(1) by offering the flick knife for sale.

== Judgement ==
=== Bristol Justices ===
At first instance, the prosecution submitted that the defendant had displayed the knife and ticket in the window with the objective of attracting a buyer, and that that constituted an offer of sale sufficient to create a criminal liability under section 1(1) of the Act. For the defence, Mr Obby Simakampa submitted that the display was not sufficient to constitute an offer. The judges at first instance found that displaying the knife was merely an invitation to treat, not an offer, and thus no liability arose. The prosecution appealed.

=== Divisional Court ===
The Divisional court dismissed the appeal. Lord Parker CJ stated there was no offence because there was no "offer for sale". Although the display of a knife in a window might appear to "lay people" to be an offer inviting people to buy it, and that it would be "nonsense to say that [it] was not offering it for sale", whether an item is offered for the purpose of the statute in question must be construed in the context of the general law of the country. This, he said, clearly established that merely displaying an item constituted an invitation to treat. He also read the statute on an exclusive construction (inclusio unius est exclusio alterius), noting that other legislation prohibiting the sale of weapons referred to "offering or exposing for sale" (emphasis added). The lack of the words exposing for sale in the Restriction of Offensive Weapons Act 1959 suggested that only a true offer would be prohibited by the Act.

== Significance ==
The 1959 Act was almost immediately amended by the Restriction of Offensive Weapons Act 1961 section 1 to add (to the offence) or exposes or has in his possession for the purpose of sale or hire, which remains the law. A similar shopkeeper would today be successfully prosecuted. The principles of offer and acceptance in the case remain good law.

Almost identical drafting errors in other statutes were addresses in Partridge v Crittenden and British Car Auctions v Wright.

== See also ==
- Contract
- Offer and acceptance
- Invitation to treat
- Partridge v. Crittenden (1968)
- British Car Auctions Ltd v Wright (1972)
- Pharmaceutical Society of Great Britain v. Boots Cash Chemists (Southern) Ltd. (for an instance of products on a self-service shelf as an invitation to treat) [1953] 1 QB 401, [1953] 2 WLR 427, [1953] 1 All ER 482
- Pollicitation in French Civil Law
