= Barry v Davies =

Barry v Davies [2000] EWCA Civ 235, [2000] 1 WLR 1962 is an English contract law case which established and confirmed that auction goods being sold without a reserve must be sold to a genuine highest bidder. The principle is subject to exceptions based on illegality, such as illicit goods, a seller without the right to sell the goods, or a buyer without the money or right to buy the goods.

== Facts ==
The auctioneer withdrew goods from an auction (the goods had no reserve price) when a bona fide (good faith, that is in this case genuine) bid of £200 was effective. The court held that an auctioneer is bound to sell to the highest bidder where there is no reserve price, and cannot withdraw the sale simply because the price is too low. A bid in an auction, the possibility of acceptance of the bid, unless the bid is withdrawn, and the benefit to the auctioneer of driving up the price bid is sufficient consideration. The contract in an auction is between the buyer and the seller, not the buyer and the auctioneer, although the buyer has a collateral agreement with the auctioneer.

== Judgment ==
The remedy is the difference between the contract (agreed) value and the current market value of the goods, per the Sale of Goods Act 1979 s. 51(3). The value in this case was £27,600.

== See also ==
- Invitation to treat
- Harris v Nickerson
- Warlow v Harrison
- Sale of Goods Act 1979
- Payne v Cave
