= Spencer v Harding =

English contract law case

- Court: Court of Common Pleas
- Decided: 29 June 1869
- Citation: (1870) LR 5 CP 561

Court membership
- Judges sitting: Willes J, Keating J and Montague Smith J

Keywords
- Contract, offer, invitation to treat, tender

Spencer v Harding (1870) LR 5 CP 561 is an English contract law case concerning the requirements of offer and acceptance in the formation of a contract. The case established that an offer inviting tenders to be submitted for the purchase of stock did not amount to an offer capable of acceptance to sell that stock, but rather amounted to an invitation to treat.

== Facts ==
The Defendants sent out a circular containing the following wording:

28, King Street, Cheapside, May 17th, 1869. We are instructed to offer to the wholesale trade for sale by tender the stock in trade of Messrs. G. Eilbeck & Co., of No. 1, Milk Street, amounting as per stock-book to 2503l. 13s. 1d., and which will be sold at a discount in one lot. Payment to be made in cash. The stock may be viewed on the premises, No. 1, Milk Street, up to Thursday, the 20th instant, on which day, at 12 o'clock at noon precisely, the tenders will be received and opened at our offices. Should you tender and not attend the sale, please address to us sealed and inclosed, 'Tender for Eilbeck's stock.' Stock-books may be had at our offices on Tuesday morning. Honey, Humphreys, & Co.

The Defendants did not promise to sell the stock to the highest bidder for cash. The Claimants sent a tender to the Defendants which, following the submission of all tenders, was the highest tender. The Defendants refused to sell the stock to the Claimants.

The Defendants submitted that the circular was not intended to be a binding offer capable of acceptance. Rather, it was merely a circular inviting others to make offers. The Claimants submitted that the circular did constitute a valid offer and that the Claimant had, by submitting the highest tender and attending all the necessary meetings, accepted that offer.

== Judgment ==
Willes J held that the circular was not an offer, but merely an invitation to gather tenders, upon which the Defendants were entitled to act. Willes, J. held that the absence of any specific wording such as "and we undertake to sell to the highest bidder" rebutted any presumption that the Defendants had intended to be bound by a contract and distinguished the present circumstances from instances of reward contract offers or an offer to the world.

Keating J and Montague Smith J concurred.

== See also ==
- Contract
- Offer and acceptance
- Invitation to treat
- Carlill v Carbolic Smoke Ball Company (for an instance of an offer to the world)
- Partridge v Crittenden (for an instance of an advertisement as an invitation to treat)
- Blackpool & Fylde Aero Club v Blackpool Borough Council (offer for tenders binding if accompanied by collateral contract)
