= Pratt Contractors Ltd v Transit New Zealand =

- Court: Judicial Committee of the Privy Council
- Full case name: Pratt Contractors Ltd v Transit New Zealand
- Decided: 1 December 2003
- Citation: [2005] 2 NZLR 433
- Transcript: http://www.nzlii.org/cgi-bin/sinodisp/nz/cases/NZPC/2003/11.html

Court membership
- Judges sitting: Lord Nicholls of Birkenhead, Lord Slynn of Hadley, Lord Hoffmann, Lord Hope of Craighead, Lord Walker of Gestingthorpe

Pratt Contractors Ltd v Transit New Zealand [2005] 2 NZLR 433 is a decision of the Judicial Committee of the Privy Council on appeal from the Court of Appeal of New Zealand regarding two highways works tenders. The decision was delivered on 1 December 2003.

The case arose out of a claim for damages made by Pratt Contractors Ltd. In 1997 the company had submitted unsuccessful tenders to Transit New Zealand during two successive tender rounds for a contract to realign State Highway 1 at Vinegar Hill on the North Island. The court which initially considered Pratt's challenge to Transit New Zealand's award decision and the Court of Appeal of New Zealand had differed in their opinions as to whether a New Zealand public authority owed a duty to a contractor to follow its own internal procedures when undertaking a public procurement exercise.

The Privy Council's judgment, delivered by Lord Hoffmann, confirmed that Transit New Zealand accepted the legal principles that:

- an invitation to tender gives rise to procedural contract determining how the resulting tenders will be dealt with, and
- there is an implied duty that the purchasing body should act fairly and in good faith.

However, the parties differed in their assessment of whether these procedural obligations has been complied with.

== See also ==
- Pratt Contractors Ltd v Palmerston North City Council, another case involving Pratt Contractors
