= Pollicitation in French Civil Law =

Concept in contract law

The term pollicitation has its roots in Roman law, where it was used to describe a promise of a gift made by a candidate for municipal magistracy. In French civil law, the term "pollicitation", or "supply", is defined as the act of proposing the contract conclusion.

A contract offer may be defined as a proposal to enter into a contract. Nevertheless, the law differentiates between these two expressions, as a proposal to contract is not subject to the same legal regime. (Note: A legal regime refers to a set of rules on a particular concept.) An offer is only classified as a solicitation if a clear and simple affirmative response (acceptance) is sufficient to establish a contract between the two parties. In other cases, the offer may be reclassified (Note: The term "disqualify" is used in law, and in this article, to designate a change in the legal qualification of a fact, in favor of a more flexible legal concept.) as an invitation to negotiate (Note: In this scenario, it would mean that there is only an invitation to negotiate. The person extending this invitation will not have been firm and precise enough regarding the content of the contract they propose. The recipient of this offer can then, in fact, make a new proposal, which we will call a counter-offer, and the person who initiated the negotiations can either accept this counter-offer or make a new one in return.) or an invitation to tender. (Note: In this scenario, the offer would not have been firm, aiming to put the recipients of the call in competition with each other. Even if very detailed in a set of specifications, calls for tenders do not commit to a precise price.)

In a strictly legal sense, as understood by French legal doctrine, (Note: The notion of "pollicitation" does not exist, strictly speaking, in other European doctrines, particularly German (the BGB is more recent than the French Civil Code and more exhaustive) or in Common Law countries (where the rule of precedent provides a legal framework for the concept of a contractual offer, without relying as extensively on legal scholars).) the definition is narrower and refers to a firm proposal to conclude a contract under determined conditions, such that acceptance of the offer is sufficient to form the contract. However, some authors downplay the distinction between offer and pollicitation, considering these two terms synonymous, while acknowledging that pollicitation, in its strict sense, carries more legal weight than an offer.

This definition has been adopted in recent legal instruments, including Article 14, paragraph 1 of the Vienna Convention of the United Nations of April 11, 1980, (Note: A proposal to conclude a contract addressed to one or more specific persons constitutes an offer if it is sufficiently precise and indicates the will of its author to be bound in case of acceptance.) the Unidroit Principles of International Commercial Contracts, (Note: A proposal to conclude a contract constitutes an offer if it is sufficiently precise and indicates the will of its author to be bound in case of acceptance.) the principles of European contract law, (Note: (1) A proposal constitutes an offer when: (a) it indicates the intention to conclude a contract in case of acceptance, (b) and contains sufficiently precise terms for a contract to be formed. (2) The offer can be made to one or more specific persons or the public. (3) A proposal made by a professional supplier, in an advertisement or catalog or by displaying goods, to supply goods or services at a set price is deemed to constitute an offer to sell or provide the services at that price until the stock of goods is exhausted or the service can no longer be provided.) and the proposed reform of the law of obligations and prescription (Note: An offer is a unilateral act determining the essential elements of the contract that its author proposes to a specific or unspecified person and by which they express their intention to be bound in case of acceptance) (which was ultimately not implemented). (Note: Contrary to what the Catala Report proposed, there is currently no article 1105-1 in the Civil Code [archive].) A similar definition is also found in the Common law countries or the Civil Code of Quebec. (Note: An offer to contract is a proposal that includes all the essential elements of the intended contract and indicates the will of its author to be bound in case of acceptance.)

Nevertheless, pollicitation is no longer the sole means of concluding a contract. Legal procedures have undergone significant evolution, particularly with the advent of pre-contracts, (Note: Preliminary contracts are sometimes called "preparatory contracts," since these preliminary contracts are made solely for the purpose of concluding a future contract.) adhesion contracts, (Note: This refers to a common category of contracts where, in reality, no negotiation is possible: either you agree to the terms of the contract, or you reject it entirely.) and the practice of punctation. (Note: In which the parties will consensually form a contract "point by point," without a single offer.) Furthermore, pollicitation is confronted with the issue of unilateral commitments, namely whether a pollicitant should be prohibited from revoking their offer. The German Civil Code accepts the principle of the impossibility of retracting an offer, whereas the French Civil Code rejects this principle in favor of contractual freedom. This means that an individual free to make an offer is also free to withdraw it. Similarly, if a condition necessary for the pollicitation to exist disappears, for example, if the pollicitant loses their legal capacity or dies, the pollicitation becomes null and void.

The concept of pollicitation remains of practical importance. In the absence of a genuine offer, no contract exists, and thus, no contractual obligation arises between the parties. The argument of the non-existence of an offer before a judge can challenge a situation that may have appeared to the other party as a contract.

Concurrently, judges are responsible for upholding legal security to prevent unwarranted or abusive retractions by politicians. While such disputes were uncommon at the inception of the French Civil Code, judges have progressively been tasked with defining the concept of pollicitation and its associated regulations since the 1950s.

In French positive law, pollicitation is defined as an externalized proposal to contract, whereby the intention to be bound in case of acceptance for the essential elements of the future contract is demonstrated. A pollicitation may be withdrawn at any time before acceptance by the recipient; otherwise, it constitutes a wrongful or abusive retraction. Finally, if the pollicitation becomes void due to the death or legal incapacity of the pollicitant, it ceases to exist.

== Nature of the offer ==
An offer to contract represents a definitive proposal to conclude a specified contract, made under the conditions outlined in the proposal.

In accordance with the tenets of the Catala Draft Project, a unilateral act is defined as a contractually binding proposal, formulated at a specified or unspecified level of detail, which, upon acceptance, expresses the intention to enter into a contractual agreement.

The offer must be presented in a clear manner.

=== Required characteristics ===
For an offer to be legally qualified as a solicitation, it must exhibit each of the following characteristics. These traits, which are sometimes called "constitutive elements", are indispensable to the existence of a solicitation. They are distinguished from other elements that, while not essential to the offer, help clarify it.

==== Precise offer ====
Under Article 14-1 of the United Nations Convention on Contracts for the International Sale of Goods:

A proposal is sufficiently definite if it indicates the goods and expressly or implicitly fixes the quantity and price or provides a means for determining them.

French common contract law espouses a comparable perspective, albeit with the caveat that the Vienna Convention is exclusively applicable to specific contractual arrangements. (Note: Common contract law, which is the legal regime for all contracts, whether named or unnamed, is opposed to the law of special contracts, which are named contracts that have a special legal regime. See in particular, Droit des contrats spéciaux en France.)

Following Pothier's formula, the fundamental components of a contract are those that "give a contract its specific nature and without which it cannot be characterized." The offer must encompass the essential elements of the proposed contract, that is, elements that facilitate its execution.

Nevertheless, ascertaining the indispensable components that must be included in the proposal and those that may be omitted due to their ancillary nature is a challenging endeavor that hinges on the specifics of the contract in question. Scholars have delineated a distinction between a "named" contract, which is subject to a defined legal framework, and an "unnamed" contract, which lacks such a framework.

===== Named contracts =====
If a contract is identified as such, and thus subject to the provisions of a specific legal text, it is that text which will serve to define the essential elements of the contract in question.

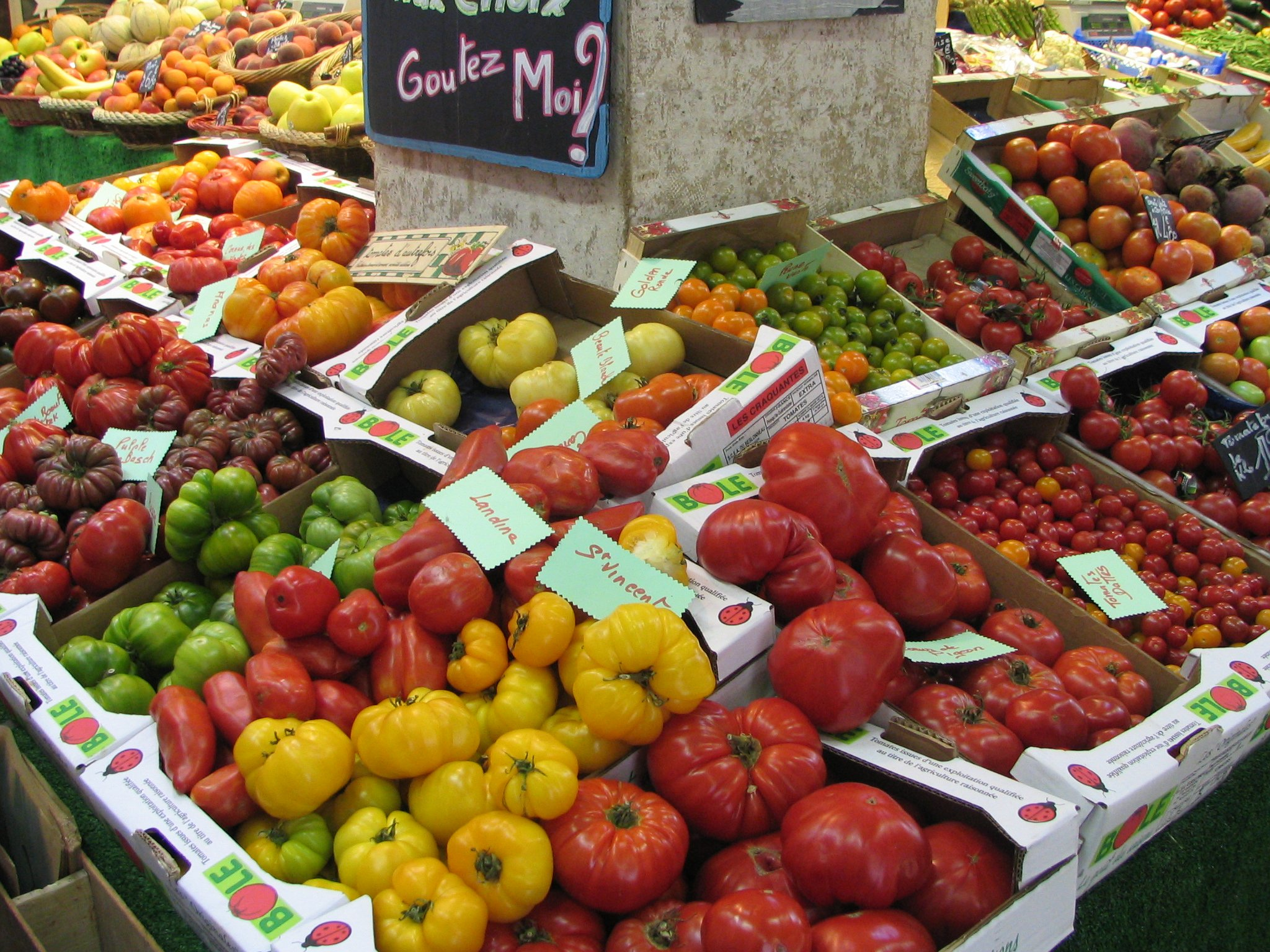
Without the indication of the price, the sales contract cannot be formed.

To illustrate, a sale, which is a defined contractual agreement, is considered complete and enforceable as soon as the parties involved have reached an agreement on the item and the price. It is not a prerequisite that the item be delivered or the price paid; rather, it is sufficient that there be an agreement on these two essential points, which then form the contract. Consequently, an offer that is legally binding in a sale proposes a specific price for a specific item.

In contrast, a lease contract, which is also a named contract, requires the offer to mention the leased property and the rent amount. In the case of commercial leases, additional elements such as the start date, purpose, and duration of the lease may be required.

===== Unnamed contracts =====
In this case, the level of precision is "quite vague." Absent a specific legal text naming the contract, nothing initially determines the essential elements of the contract. In such cases, the judge will have to determine the elements on a case-by-case basis, sometimes following the "guidance" of doctrine, which can also be quite vague.

To illustrate, it has been determined that an offer to an Actor must include, among other stipulations, the proposed remuneration and the commencement date of filming.

In a series of rulings related to the issue of price indeterminacy, the French Court of Cassation also determined that a reference to a rate (Note: The rate is a price which is not precisely determined (e.g. a precisely determined price: €845.30), but which is determinable for the future (e.g. 5% of the revenue from a production, when the production has not yet been carried out).) could suffice to provide sufficient precision in an offer, provided that it was not abused or intended to yield illegitimate profit.

===== Role of the parties =====
In some instances, the judge may be tasked with classifying certain contractual obligations as principal, while others are regarded as accessory. The former are indispensable for forming the contract, whereas the latter serves only to determine how the principal obligations will be executed. Consequently, accessory obligations are not regarded as essential elements of the contract.

For instance, the date and place of payment in a sale contract may be considered a secondary element, although the parties may agree that it is to be regarded as an essential component. In such cases, the contract must explicitly indicate that the date and place of payment are to be regarded as essential.

In the absence of an explicit stipulation, the terms of execution may be defined subsequent to the formation of the contract, in accordance with legal provisions (Note: The term "legal" can be understood in the broadest sense of the term: statute, regulation and custom can all be invoked.) or customary practices. (Note: Usage is understood as mere habit, while custom is a habit whose date of origin cannot be specified.) However, should one of the parties consider these elements to be indispensable, they may be excluded from the contract.

===== Place left to the nature of the contract =====
In some contracts, it is not customary to fix the price beforehand, at the moment of forming the contract. This is notably the case with a business contract or a power of attorney. Similarly, the proposal from a jeweler who wanted to modify the ceiling of his insurance contract for the "lowest possible premium" was considered sufficiently precise and therefore merits the designation of pollicitation.

===== Contracts by electronic means =====
Article 1369-4 of the French Civil Code stipulates that an electronic offer must contain certain content inherent to electronic transactions. To be considered an electronic offer, it must therefore include:

The different steps to follow to conclude the contract electronically;

- The technical means that allow the user, before concluding the contract, to identify and correct errors made in data entry;
- The languages offered for concluding the contract;
- In the case of contract archiving, the methods for archiving by the offeror and the conditions of access to the archived contract;
- The means of electronically consulting professional and commercial rules to which the offeror intends to submit, if applicable.

This only applies to consumer law relations between consumers and professionals. Only professionals who offer the supply of goods or services are required to provide an offer with this minimum content. This is not, strictly speaking, a condition of precision, but rather a minimum content imposed by the legislator. It is a condition for the offer validity, not a condition for its existence. An electronic offer must still propose the essential elements of the contract.

==== Firm offer ====
The offer must be unambiguous and not the result of hasty consideration. The offeror must be prepared to be bound by the proposal and to be committed in the event of acceptance. Consequently, the pollicitant agrees that the formation of the contract is no longer contingent on his actions. Failure to meet this requirement would effectively constitute an invitation to enter into negotiations to initiate a discussion on the content of the prospective contract, rather than a pollicitation.

To illustrate, a proposal to sell a vehicle at a fixed price could be regarded as a form of solicitation. In such an instance, the vendor would be bound to sell the vehicle to the purchaser who is willing to pay the stated price without delay, provided that:

- The identity of the buyer was not a determining factor (as in the case of a contract intuitu personæ);
- The offeror cannot find a legitimate excuse to not be bound (if no legitimate excuse is found, it could be a case of refusal to sell; a legitimate excuse would be, for instance, the manifest insolvency of the buyer).

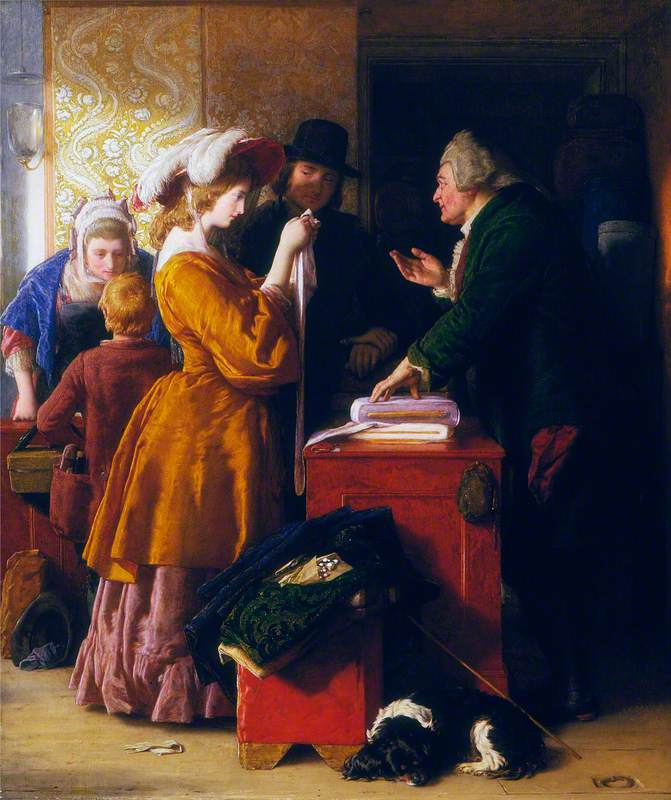
Choosing the Wedding Gown, William Mulready (1845).

A ruling from the Commercial Chamber of the French Court of Cassation on March 6, 1990, established that a pollicitation cannot include the possibility of retraction (Note: On the other hand, the withdrawal of an offer after it has been accepted should not be considered identical to the simple revocation of the pollicitation, when the offer has not met with acceptance. In the case of revocation, the offeror simply withdraws his offer at his sole discretion: the pollicitation has not met with acceptance, there has been no meeting of the minds, and therefore no contract exists, under Article 1101 of the French Civil Code.) but must "indicate the will of its author to be bound in case of acceptance." Although initially applied to merchants, doctrine has considered the scope of this principle to be general and not limited to commercial relations alone. Muriel-Fabre Magnan suggests that the High Court may have intended to emphasize that negotiations between merchants tend to be longer, making it more necessary to characterize their intent to be bound.

===== Conditions (reservations) =====
A reservation is a limitation set forth by the author of a proposal concerning their intention to enter into a contract, which may be express or implied. A reservation may pertain to the fundamental tenets of the contract, the identity of the contracting party (such as classified advertisements in newspapers), or the conditions of the contract (such as the stipulation that the price is open for negotiation). The existence of a reservation limits the firmness of the initial offer. The doctrine has sought to determine which reservations can be compatible with a firm proposal and which result in the disqualification of the proposal as an invitation to negotiate.

French doctrine distinguishes between two hypotheses: relative reservations, which are enforceable against certain parties, and absolute reservations, which are enforceable against all. It is only the former that results in the disqualification of the pollicitation as an invitation to negotiate. Some argue that the key is whether the reservation allows the author of the proposal to "arbitrarily withdraw." If so, it is an invitation to negotiate. Others consider that a reservation disqualifies the offer if it is incompatible with the definition of a firm offer. This is to say that if the offeror does not intend to be bound by the simple acceptance of the offeree, the offer is to be regarded as such.

Ultimately, the evaluation of the firmness of an offer is conducted on a case-by-case basis, with the following factors being considered primarily:

- The terms of the proposal, which may reveal the extent of the commitment;
- The offeree (an offer to a specific person is generally firmer than a public offer);
- The nature of the contemplated contract (the more intuitu personæ the contract, the more important the consideration of the person, and the more likely it is that the offeror has reserved the right to approve their partner).

In evaluating the legitimacy of a contract, the judge considers not only the intent of the offeror but also the legitimate belief that might have arisen in the offeree's mind. For example, Muriel-Fabre Magnan cites a case in which the author of a letter falsely led the recipient to believe that they had won a prize or money. The judges found that there was an obligation to pay based on a contract, despite the author's lack of intention to be bound by it. The circumstances of the case allowed the recipient to reasonably believe in the promised prize.

===== Disqualifying reservations =====
In essence, any offer that permits its creator to retract is not a solicitation but an invitation to engage in negotiations.

For example, an express reservation of approval, such as a proposal that is "subject to confirmation", where the seller retains the possibility of notifying a refusal after the buyer signs or makes the contract contingent on the signature of the company's general director, indicates that the seller does not intend to be bound upon acceptance. Such a proposal constitutes an invitation to negotiate, whereby the recipient is invited to make a second offer, which may or may not be accepted.

It is not uncommon for reservations to be expressed in contracts intuitu personæ. (Note: In an intuitu personae contract, the essential element of the contract is the person of the other party. It is this person who will determine the consent of the other party.) To illustrate, in an employment contract, the recruiter may make a proposal that includes sufficiently precise elements while reserving the right to approve the candidate they ultimately hire. It is evident that the recruiter retains a legitimate right of reservation and is not obliged to hire the first qualified candidate. Consequently, job "offers" that are advertised in newspapers are not offers but rather invitations to negotiate.

In the context of a credit offer, the issuer (e.g., a bank) is responsible for evaluating the applicant's solvency. In such cases, the individual responding to the proposal is regarded as the proponent, rather than the initiator of the contractual process. Consequently, the individual seeking a loan is considered to be making the offer.

===== Non-disqualifying reservations =====
It is common for authors to cite the example of an announcement for a product sale, "while stocks last." While this may be seen as a reservation, it is nevertheless a solicitation because it is an objective condition that does not depend on the will of the offeror, and the offeror has no arbitrary discretion. As long as the stock is not depleted, the offeror is obliged to honor the orders they receive.

===== Incompatible offers =====
Ultimately, if multiple incompatible offers are extended by the same individual, the offeror is not at liberty to select the proposal that is most advantageous to them. Such an action would constitute a form of auctioning, even though the recipients of this "offer" (which is an invitation to propose a counteroffer) do not perceive themselves to be in a competitive situation. The recipients of an offer have a legitimate expectation that they are the only parties to whom the offer is made. This expectation is linked to the firmness of the offer, as an offeror who makes multiple and incompatible offers (such as proposing the sale of the same item to several specific individuals) does not intend to be bound by the simple acceptance of the offer's recipient.

==== Externalized offer ====
An offer is an expression of will that is directed towards another party. As such, the offer must be made known to others. However, there is only a proposal if the offer to contract is externalized. Otherwise, no potential contracting party can accept the offer due to their inability to be aware of it.

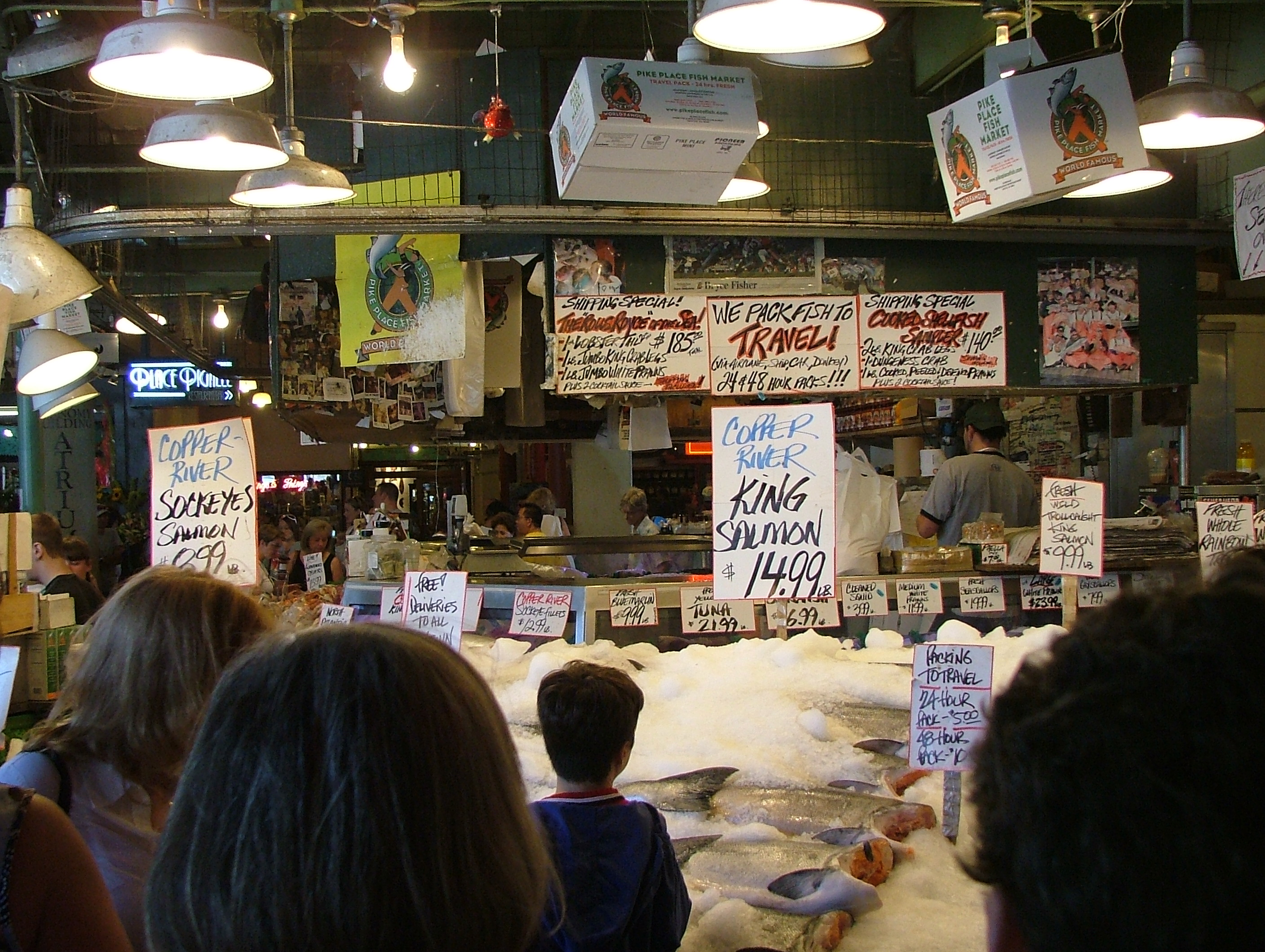
An example of the express externalization of an offer: signs giving the price of fish for sale.

In the majority of cases, externalization is an explicit process. The offeror is required to externalize their offer through a variety of communication methods, including writing (letter, catalog, poster, ad, message transmitted by telegram, fax, or telex), speaking, or even through gestures, as is the case in stock exchanges or auctions. Following the doctrine of consensualism, there is no prescribed format for the declaration of an offer. It is sufficient that there be at least an unambiguous affirmative action, leaving no doubt in the minds of witnesses as to the offeror's intention to conclude a contract.

Additionally, jurisprudence recognizes the validity of implicit offers, defined as those that are not explicitly expressed through silence but can be inferred from certain actions that indicate a willingness to enter into a contractual agreement. For instance, behavior or an attitude that signals a readiness to engage in a contractual relationship can serve as an offer, even in the absence of direct action, due to the influence of legal or customary norms.

An omission may be interpreted as an indication of an intention to limit or restrict the scope of a contract. For example, Article 1738 of the French Civil Code states that if, upon the expiration of a lease, the tenant remains in the premises, it constitutes an implicit offer to renew the lease. The same can be said of tacit contract renewals. The silence of both parties suggests that the previous contract was satisfactory and that it is in their interest to continue it. Otherwise, one party would have expressed an intention to terminate. Therefore, the intent to continue can be deduced from the absence of an intention to terminate.

Another example is that of a taxi driver waiting at a station with the light on, which constitutes an offer, even though the driver performs no positive action to signal their intent to contract. This situation of an implicit offer is recognized by custom. Similarly, a functioning vending machine is considered to be making an offer.

The term "implicit" is used to describe an offer that is not formally expressed. When an offer is implicit, it is always explicit in the etymological sense, meaning expressed. Silence alone cannot be considered a proposal to contract because silence is ambiguous and expresses nothing. Accepting silence as a mode of "expression" would establish a form of forced contract. Thus, some authors argue that there is no truly implicit offer, except in the case of a tenant who remains silent.

=== Indifferent characteristics ===
==== Recipients of the offer ====
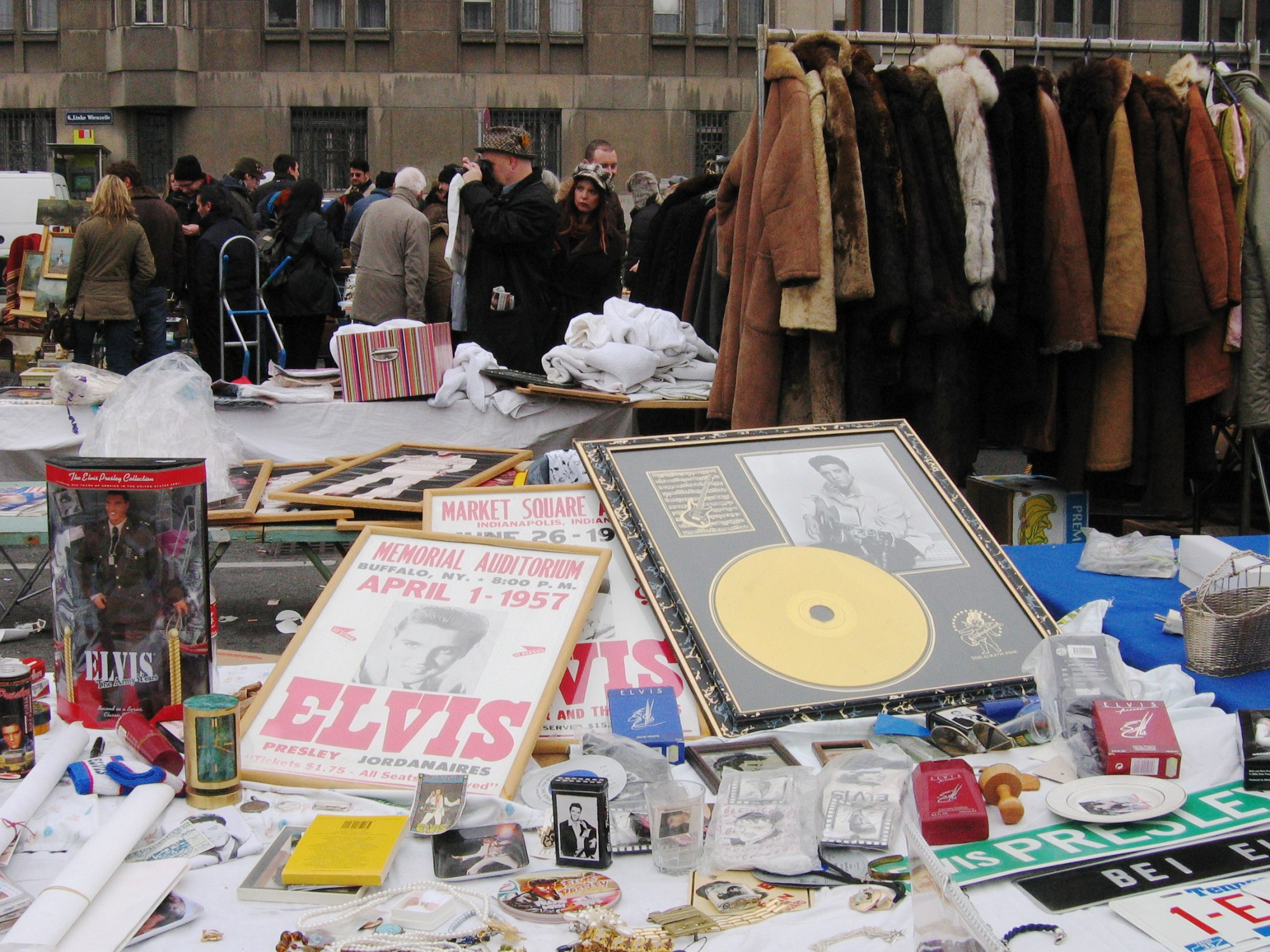
At a second-hand shop, the offer is made to the general public.

An offer may be directed to a single individual or multiple recipients. In the latter case, the offeror may choose to disseminate the offer through various channels, such as posters, catalogues, advertisements, and so forth.

In the latter case, these are referred to as "collective offers." An offer is deemed to be made to the public even if, in practice, it is directed by name to a substantial number of individuals, identified through a registry, for example. Consequently, this differentiation is constrained by specific commercial practices. The offer may also be directed "to the public", except for certain individuals. For instance, a professional reseller is precluded from purchasing substantial quantities of goods during a supermarket's promotional offer, which is naturally intended for its consumer clientele. Professionals, therefore, are excluded from these promotional offers.

In general, the distinction between an offer to the public and an offer to a specific person has minimal practical consequence. This is because the French Court of Cassation has established the legal principle that "an offer made to the public binds the offeror to the first acceptor under the same conditions as an offer made to a specific person." This is contrary to the legal position set out in the Vienna Convention and the legal systems of England, Germany, and Switzerland. Some legal commentators have expressed doubt about the validity of this rule, particularly in the context of real estate transactions.

However, exceptions to this principle are acknowledged:

- In the first instance, if the offeror has reserved the right to approve their co-contractor, this results in the disqualification of the offer as an invitation to enter into negotiations.
- Secondly, and most importantly, when the offer made to the public concerns a contract that is typically concluded based on the person (a contract intuitu personae), the offer is essentially a proposal, with the approval reservation being implicit.

==== Maintenance of the offer over time ====
In some cases, an offer may be accompanied by a deadline of a legal origin, which in turn determines the legal regime of the offer.

===== Legally imposed deadline =====
While the law may require the maintenance of the offer, it does not preclude the parties from allowing for a longer reflection period, even when a deadline has been imposed.

Some provisions of consumer law, in addition to stipulating that the offer must originate from a professional, specify that the offer must be maintained for a designated period to allow the consumer sufficient time to review and reflect on it in a calm and undisturbed manner. In consumer credit contracts, Article L311-8 imposes the maintenance of an offer for 15 days, extended to 30 days in mortgage credit contracts by Article L312-10. The deadline is six days for distance education contracts. In practice, this period is considered by some authors to be a true promise of contract, rather than merely an offer.

Similarly, this phenomenon can manifest in professional relationships. Article 1, paragraph 3 of the Doubin Law of December 31, 1989, now codified in Article L330-3, paragraph 4 of the French Commercial Code, stipulates that any individual who offers to provide another in the event that an individual or entity offers a trade name, trademark, or sign to another party, requiring exclusive or quasi-exclusive use of their business activity, a draft contract must be provided at least 20 days before the signing of the contract, accompanied by an informative document.

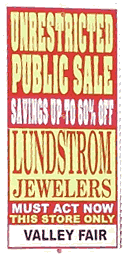
A promotional offer is, by its very nature, limited in time.

Article 1369-4 of the French Civil Code stipulates that the author of an offer to supply goods or services via electronic means "remains bound by it as long as it is accessible electronically by their own actions." In other words, the offer is maintained as long as the offeror leaves it accessible.

===== Determinable deadline =====
In the absence of any legal obligation, the offeror may explicitly establish a deadline:

- Either directly, by specifying a duration (in days, weeks, or even months) or a date;
- Or indirectly, if the duration is implied by the offer. For example, by setting a day for visiting a property they are selling, the offeror is committing to maintaining the offer until that date.

This legal practice allows the offeror to grant sufficient reflection time, even when the law does not already provide specific protection, and also to prevent an offer made under particularly favorable conditions (low price, discount, free credit) from being extended indefinitely.

Once the deadline has elapsed, the offer is considered null and void. It is as if it had never existed, and an acceptance made after the deadline cannot form the basis of a contract.

It is conceivable that the duration of the deadline may be both indeterminate and determinable. To illustrate, when an offer is made "until stocks are exhausted", despite the absence of a fixed deadline for the offer's validity, this deadline can be determined retrospectively.

===== Indeterminable deadline =====
In the absence of a specified deadline, legal precedent established in 1869 holds that an offer cannot remain valid for an unreasonable period. This is defined as the time necessary for the intended recipient to examine the proposal and respond. The courts are responsible for determining the existence and length of such an implicit deadline. As a result, the deadline cannot be determined objectively as it would have been by a reasonable person. Instead, it must be subjective, based on the specifics of the case. Accordingly, the duration in question is subject to variation by the circumstances at hand. Factors such as the offeror's indication that the offer must be accepted expeditiously, the nature of the contract, usage, the possibility of rapid market fluctuations, and even the distance between the parties, when immediate communication is not feasible, may contribute to this variation.

==== Author of the offer ====
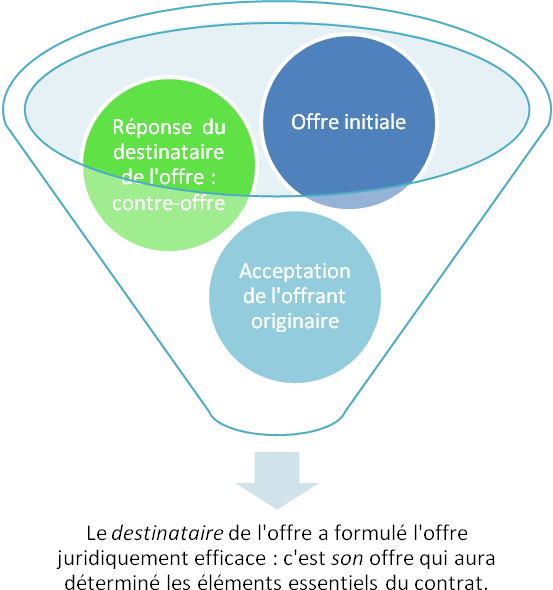
Diagram explaining how the recipient of the first offer can end up issuing the legally effective offer.

In the context of a pre-contractual process, the author of the offer is the party who formulates the proposal and secures its acceptance from the recipient without any reservation or counterproposal. The author of the offer is not necessarily the same party who initiated the pre-contractual process. Indeed, when an offer is subject to a counterproposal or an acceptance with reservation, negotiations continue, and the one who eventually makes the legally effective offer may be the recipient of the initial offer.

Furthermore, the initial proposal may be rendered null and void, thereby allowing for the resumption of negotiations at a later date.

Similarly, the author of the offer is not necessarily the same individual who drafted the contract. It is sufficient for the initial recipient to modify, even a minor one, to the proposal that determines their consent, for them to become the author of a new offer, which must be accepted by the drafter of the initial project.

In certain instances, legislative bodies have established criteria for determining the individual or entity responsible for formulating an offer. This is particularly evident in instances where one party's interests may be protected. For instance, the law specifies that the donor (C. civ., art. 894) and the principal (C. civ., art. 1984) are the ones who initiate the offer. This is also evident in other legal domains, such as labor and consumer law. In these contexts, the employee or consumer is the one who initiates the first contact, but the law designates the dominant party (employer, seller) as the offeror.

==== Form of the offer ====
In accordance with the tenets of consensualism, the specific format of the offer is inconsequential, provided that it is manifested externally. No particular mode of expression is obligatory. Illustrative examples include the display of merchandise with a price tag, a taxi parked in a designated area with the meter deactivated and the driver at the wheel, or a functioning vending machine. Verbal assertions or "purely material" gestures may also be deemed offers.

In a ruling from June 3, 2003, not published in Bulletin des arrêts des chambres civiles de la Cour de cassation, the commercial chamber reached a decision that may appear to be at odds with the prevailing view. An unsigned memorandum of understanding had been distributed by a banking institution to a company. The Court of Appeal determined that the bank did not intend to be bound by the terms of the proposed agreement in the event of acceptance. The court ruled that the contested documents did not constitute an offer, but rather a mere starting point for negotiations. However, the Court of Cassation held that the Court of Appeal had not conditioned the parties' consent and the formation of the contract on any formal requirements, thus correctly applying the law. The appeal was therefore rejected. Nonetheless, the reasoning behind this decision was not a challenge to the principle of consensualism but a review of the firmness of the offer. This decision has not been reused in subsequent cases.

== Regime of the offer ==
=== Revocation of the offer ===
An offer is defined as a proposal to contract, which contains no commitment from the offeror. This feature of the offer's regime is a peculiarity of positive law, as an offer, as a legal act, should, in principle, bind its author. However, the offeror is only proposing to contract and does not commit to contracting, (Note: If this were the case, then there would be a unilateral promise of contract, i.e. a real contract, with binding force.) unlike the promisor in a unilateral promise. The principle is that of contractual freedom, which allows the offeror to withdraw their offer until the recipient accepts it.

Nevertheless, this tenet of unilaterally revocable offers may engender legal uncertainty. Given that offers can be revoked at any time, the recipient may feel compelled to hastily declare acceptance of the contract without sufficient reflection.

The offeror may also inflict harm upon another party without assuming any liability. To illustrate, if an offeror proposes to a potential buyer to traverse France to facilitate the purchase of a vehicle, having guaranteed to await their arrival, but instead sells the vehicle to a third party without delay, this would constitute an abuse of rights. Furthermore, case law has documented instances of prospective purchasers who have experienced irreversible changes to their legal status. One individual terminated their lease, resulting in homelessness, while another resigned from their position in response to an attractive offer. In such cases, judges may determine that the revocation of the offer constitutes an abusive act. Consequently, the buyer who has incurred expenses in response to the offer may be reimbursed for the costs (such as transportation or study) they have incurred, or compensated for matters that were neglected in anticipation of the contract's conclusion.

Offer not yet communicated

Some authors contend that case law has constrained the principle of free revocability of communicated offers to such an extent that it is only fully applicable when the offer has not yet been communicated to the recipient. Nevertheless, this scenario, which presents no difficulty, remains marginal. The offeror can always interrupt transmission (in which case, the recipient will never know they were an offer recipient) or retract the offer by a faster means of communication.

Once the offer has been delivered to the intended recipient, a number of constraints become apparent.

==== Limitation of the principle ====
The principles of doctrine and case law concur in their recognition of the necessity of imposing limitations upon the fundamental tenet of the revocability of an offer, as communicated to its intended recipient. Indeed, there may be instances wherein the maintenance of an offer is contingent upon a specified period, during which the potential acceptor is afforded the requisite time to conduct a comprehensive examination of the proposal, to arrive at a decision, and to respond in a manner that is deemed appropriate.

In the absence of a specified period during which the offeror's offer is to remain valid, case law allows the recipient a reasonable period, in consideration of legal security.

Specified period

If the offeror specifies a particular period, they are bound by law to maintain the offer until its expiration. In the event of a withdrawal of an offer, despite the initial promise to maintain it, the offeror may be held liable under Article 1382 of the Civil Code for the full extent of damages incurred by the recipient as a result of the withdrawal. Nevertheless, judges typically refrain from ordering the automatic conclusion of the contract in deference to the doctrine of freedom of will.

If the law establishes a period, the revocation of the offer is also considered invalid. Nevertheless, some scholars have proposed that in such circumstances, the acceptance, which occurs after the premature revocation but before the conclusion of the legal period for maintaining the offer, may still constitute a contract, despite the offeror's revocation of the offer, thereby indicating their refusal to enter into a contract. This would not be a promise of contract, but rather a distinct offer to which the law attaches the special obligation of maintaining it for a specified duration.

Unspecified period

In the absence of a specified period, a distinction must be made between offers made to the public and those made to a specific individual. However, the question of whether such a distinction is warranted is open to debate and must be considered relatively. The determination of this period is at the discretion of the judge, and the Court of Cassation may, through an appeal, request that the judge determine whether the offer in question does not implicitly contain a reasonable period of acceptance due to a failure to address conclusions.

Offer made to the public

An offer made to the public without a specified period will be considered revocable at the will of the offeror. This interpretation aligns with the stipulations set forth in Article 14-2 of the Vienna Convention, which deems that, in the absence of a defined period, the offer is merely an invitation and not a bona fide offer.

Offer made to specific persons

In accordance with established case law, a "reasonable" or "moral" period must invariably be afforded to the recipient of the offer. In general, this period is relatively brief, particularly in commercial matters, to facilitate prompt transactions. Once this period has elapsed, the right of revocation can be exercised freely. The duration of this reasonable period is left to the discretion of trial judges. Once revocation is possible, the offeror is not required to notify the recipient with a formal warning; revocation can be done without prior notice to the recipient once the reasonable period has expired.

==== Legal basis ====
Many theories have been put forth to explain the rationale behind the obligation to maintain an offer over time, which seems to be at odds with the tenet of freedom of will. This latter concept posits that an individual should be able to act freely and undo their actions if they so choose. Some scholars have sought to ground this obligation in the legal tradition of France, which identifies contracts and liability as the primary sources of legal obligations. However, others have challenged this view by proposing a third source of legal obligation: the individual themselves.

Pre-contract theory

The theory of pre-contract was first proposed by Demolombe. If an offeror makes an offer specifying that they will maintain it for a specified period, it can be argued that two distinct offers are being made. The first is an offer that determines the content of the future contract, while the second is an offer that proposes to maintain the initial offer for a certain period. This additional proposal presents only advantages for the recipient, and it can be presumed that the recipient has tacitly accepted it. As a result, a pre-contract is formed, obliging the offeror to maintain the offer for the specified period. According to this doctrine, if no period is stipulated, it is presumed that the offeror intended to allow time for reflection. Consequently, there is an implicit offer of a period, implicitly accepted by the recipient.

This foundation has been the subject of criticism because it is largely artificial. If the recipient's silence is deemed to be tantamount to acceptance of the offer when it is made to their exclusive benefit, it follows that the resulting contract should not be regarded as mere fiction. The validity of this foundation is contingent upon an actual agreement to maintain the offer for a specified period. Demolombe's explanation provides a compelling illustration of the exaggerations inherent in the theory of freedom of will.

Civil liability

Other authors appeal to civil liability as a solution. This approach is derived from the tradition of Pothier, who derived the offeror's obligation from a rule of equity, which states that "no one should suffer from another's actions." For these authors, the withdrawal of the offer constitutes a fault that causes harm to the recipient. The offeror compensates for this fault through damages or by remedying the situation by deciding that the contract is concluded, despite the withdrawal of the offer.

However, the existence of a fault is contingent upon the existence of a pre-existing obligation, which is precisely what we are attempting to demonstrate. Nevertheless, these authors employ the theory of abuse of rights, which posits that the offer creates in the recipient's mind a legitimate expectation, namely the hope of a contract, which is subsequently disappointed by its premature withdrawal. The necessity for legal security, an inherent aspect of business relations, necessitates that legitimate trust not be deceived.

==== Theory of unilateral commitment ====
Some authors oppose the notion of revocability and specifically advocate for the theory of unilateral commitment, which prohibits the author of an offer from retracting it. Once an offer is made, it is considered to have a certain degree of autonomy from its author. The offer, in and of itself, can be seen as a source of obligations. However, French law only recognizes certain sources of obligations, namely the law, the contract, quasi-contract, offense, and quasi-offense. This is in contrast to the mere offer, which is not considered a source of obligations in and of itself. This theory has never been established in French positive law.

In contrast, it is upheld in German civil law. The German Civil Code (Bürgerliches Gesetzbuch) states in §145: (Note: Translation proposed by Terré, Simler & Lequette 2005, p. 125)

Anyone who proposes to another to conclude a contract is bound by the offer unless they have excluded this binding effect.

— BGB, § 145 Bindung an den Antrag

Consequently, the author of the offer is obliged to maintain it for a period that varies according to the circumstances. Furthermore, the death or incapacity of the offeror occurring after the offer has been made does not prevent the offer from being accepted. Rather, the offer survives its author and has an autonomous legal existence. However, some scope is permitted for the theory of autonomy of will, as the offeror may reserve the right of retraction, provided that it is explicit.

In French law, some authors have put forth a dualist analysis. This approach suggests that an offeror is only bound by a unilateral declaration of will when they have committed to maintaining an offer for a specified period. Otherwise, the theory of civil liability would apply.

==== Summary ====
The legal regime of the revocation of an offer can be summarized as follows.

Has the offer been accepted?	Has the offer been communicated to the recipient?	Was an explicit period set?	Can the offeror retract the offer?
Offer accepted.	indifferent.	indifferent.	Withdrawal impossible: contract formed.
Offer not accepted.	Offer has reached the addressee.	Deadline set.	Offer irrevocable within the time limit.
Offer not accepted.	Offer has reached the addressee.	Deadline not set.	Offer irrevocable within a reasonable period.
Offer not accepted.	Offer not yet received by the addressee.	indifferent.	Withdrawal possible: freedom of contract.

===== Other legal instruments =====
Additionally, the UNIDROIT Principles delineate a framework for revocating an offer, which is analogous to the provisions outlined in the Principles of European Contract Law. This framework establishes a status for an explicitly irrevocable offer. This approach is analogous to the solution enshrined in French law, wherein an offer accompanied by a deadline set by the offeror is irrevocable for that period.

=== Lapse of the offer ===
An offer is deemed to have lapsed when a component indispensable to its continued validity is no longer present after its initial presentation. From the instant this component is no longer available, the offer is no longer capable of producing any effect, irrespective of the intentions of the offeror.

Acceptance

Firstly, the offer in question will lapse once it is accepted. To elaborate further, when an offer is made to the public but can only result in a single contract, the first acceptance will cause the offer to lapse for other potential acceptors, as it is impossible for the offer to survive.

Passage of time

Furthermore, an offer is deemed to have lapsed once a specified period has elapsed. However, the question of how to determine this period remains unresolved.

If the offeror had specified the period during which their offer remained valid, they would be at fault if they withdrew it prematurely. However, after this period, any acceptance would be ineffective, as the offer would have disappeared. In this sense, the specified period binds both the offeror and the recipient; once it expires, the offer lapses. It has been determined that this lapse may occur on the day after the period expires.

In the absence of a specified period, it is typically assumed that the offer includes an implicit promise of a reasonable "moral" period, the duration of which is at the discretion of the trial judges. This solution is consistent with the provisions of Article 18-2 of the Vienna Convention, which stipulates that the acceptance of an offer is not considered valid if the indication of consent is not received by the offeror within the specified period or, in the absence of such stipulation, within a reasonable period, taking into account the circumstances of the transaction and the speed of communication used by the offeror.

It is essential to differentiate between the implicit period of maintaining the offer and the period of lapse itself, as the two periods serve distinct purposes:

- In the first case, it is about determining whether the offeror was at fault for withdrawing their offer too early;
- In the second, it is about determining whether the offer was still valid and, therefore, whether the acceptance could form the contract.

When a period has been expressly specified by the offeror, this distinction does not need to be made.

Loss of Capacity, death

Following French legal principles, the offer is also deemed to have lapsed in the event of the offeror's death or incapacity. This is an established legal principle.

Previously, the Third Civil Chamber of the French Court of Cassation had ruled in opposition to this principle in the case of death. However, in a more recent decision, the High Court reverted to its traditional stance. This reaffirmation of an age-old principle suggests that the Court of Cassation is not inclined to disassociate the offer from the will that gave rise to it, as proponents of the unilateral commitment theory would prefer. If the offer is revoked due to the seller's demise, as there is no formal stipulation about the consent of the parties involved in the transaction, it falls upon the presiding judges to ascertain whether the purchaser had indeed manifested their assent before the seller's passing.

In a decision dated June 25, 2014, the Court of Cassation ruled that an offer without a set period lapses upon the death of the person making the offer before it has been accepted. The Court differentiates between offers with a specified duration and those without a defined period. When the offer is of an unlimited duration, the offeror's intention to enter into a contract expires with their demise, resulting in the offer's termination. Conversely, when the offer encompasses a specified timeframe, it remains valid until the conclusion of that period, and the offeror's death does not affect the offer's validity.

== See also ==
=== Legal instruments in the pre-contractual process ===
- Parley
- Invitation to tender

=== Common law jurisprudence on the offer ===
- Carlill v Carbolic Smoke Ball Co (United Kingdom)
- Fisher v Bell (United Kingdom)
- Leonard v. Pepsico, Inc. (United States)

== Bibliography ==
- Chauvel, Patrick (1995). Répertoire de droit civil [Civil Law Directory]. Consentement (in French). Paris: Dalloz. ISBN 2247032443.
- Terré, François; Simler, Philippe; Lequette, Yves (2005). Les obligations [Obligations]. Précis Dalloz (in French). Paris: Dalloz. pp. 118–130. ISBN 2247063225.
- Malaurie, Philippe; Aynès, Laurent; Stoffel-Munck, Philippe (2005). Les obligations [Obligations]. Droit civil (in French). Paris: Répertoire Defrénois. ISBN 2856230768.
- Ghestin, Jacques (1999). Traité de droit civil. Les obligations. La formation du contrat [Treatise on civil law. Obligations. Contract formation] (in French). LGDJ / Montchrestien. ISBN 2275017976.
- Fabre-Magnan, Muriel (2004). Les obligations [Obligations] (in French). Paris: Presses Universitaires de France. ISBN 2130503926.
