= Puffery =

Exaggerated or false praise

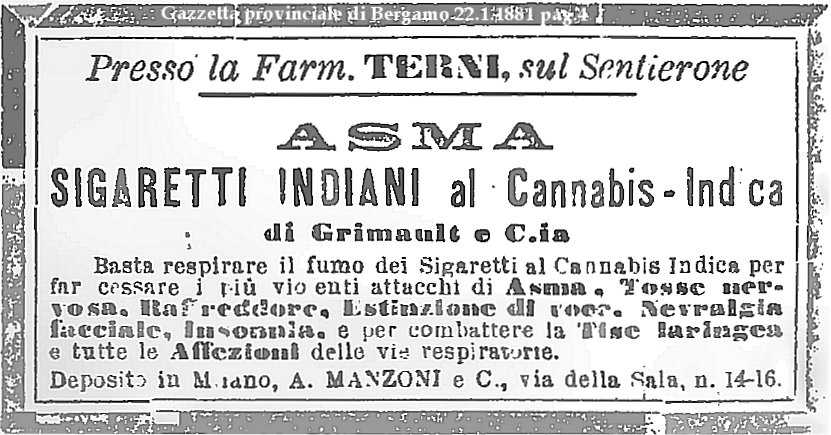
1881 Italian ad for Cannabis indica cigarillos, promising to "stop the most violent attacks of asthma, nervous cough, colds, extinction of voice, facial neuralgia and insomnia, and to combat all laryngeal and respiratory ailments."

Puffery is undue or exaggerated praise. Puffery serves to "puff up" what is being described. In law, puffery is usually invoked as a defense argument: it identifies general praising speech, typically produced by a seller, which is not expected to be relied upon and does not give rise to legal liability. In a circular manner, legal explanations for this normative position describe the non-enforceable speech as a statement that no "reasonable person" would take seriously.

== Origin ==
In a legal context, the term originated in the 1892 English Court of Appeal case Carlill v Carbolic Smoke Ball Company, which centred on whether a monetary reimbursement should be paid when an influenza preventive device failed to work. The manufacturers had paid for advertising stating that £100 would be paid in such circumstances then failed to follow this promise. Part of their defence was that such a statement was "mere puff" and not meant to be taken seriously. While the defence ultimately lost the case, the principle was confirmed that certain statements made by advertisers that were obviously not made in a serious manner could be exempt from usual rules relating to promises in open contracts.

== Federal Trade Commission definition ==
The United States Federal Trade Commission (FTC) defined puffery as a "term frequently used to denote the exaggerations reasonably to be expected of a seller as to the degree of quality of his product, the truth or falsity of which cannot be precisely determined."

The FTC stated in 1983 that puffery does not warrant enforcement action by the commission. In its FTC Policy Statement on Deception, the Commission stated: "The Commission generally will not pursue cases involving obviously exaggerated or puffing representations, i.e., those that the ordinary consumers do not take seriously."

== Puff piece ==
Puff piece is an idiom for a journalistic form of puffery: an article or story of exaggerating praise that often ignores or downplays opposing viewpoints or evidence to the contrary. In some cases, reviews of films, albums, or products (e.g., a new car or television set) may be considered to be "puff pieces", due to the actual or perceived bias of the reviewer: a review of a product, film, or event that is written by a sympathetic reviewer or by an individual who has a connection to the product or event in question, either in terms of an employment relationship or other links. For example, a major media conglomerate that owns both print media and record companies may instruct an employee in one of its newspapers to do a review of an album which is being released by the conglomerate's record company.

Although some journalists may possess professional independence and integrity, and insist on producing an unbiased review, in other cases a writer may succumb to the pressure and pen a biased "puff piece" which praises the product or event while omitting any discussion of any shortcomings. In some cases, "puff pieces" purport to provide a review of the product or event, but instead merely provide peacock words ("an amazing recording"; "revealed" for 'announced' or 'said'), weasel words ("probably one of the most important albums of the 2000s"; "Perhaps one of the leading bands of the 2010s") and tabloid-style filler which is peripheral or irrelevant to assessing the qualities of the product or event ("during the filming, there were rumours that romantic sparks flew between the two co-leads, who were often seen talking together on the set").

The financial relationship between the product company or entertainment firm and the reviewer is not always as obvious as a cash payment. In some cases, a small group of reviewers may be given an exclusive invitation to test-drive a new sports car or see a new film before it is released. This privileged access to the product may lead the reviewer to do a biased review, either out of a sense of obligation, or because of a concern that the failure to produce a "puff piece" will lead to the loss of future preview privileges. In some cases, the potential for bias in invitation-only preview sessions is substantially heightened when the reviewers are flown in to the location for the review, given fancy hotel rooms, and provided catered food and drinks during the actual review. The most egregious cases of this situation occur when, instead of inviting the reviewers to the company headquarters or another logical venue, the company gives all-expense paid tickets to Hawaii or Mexico, and holds the preview screening of the film or the product launch there.

A particular use for puff pieces may be in health journalism. Providers of alternative medicine may be unable to make claims due to laws against false advertising, but they may be able to place stories and testimonials with journalists who can write as they wish under press freedom laws. Recruiting health journalists to write puff pieces may be a lucrative way to build the reputation of a product that has no medical value.

== See also ==
- Boosterism
- Restaurant menu writing style
