= Payne v Cave =

English contract law case on auctions

Payne v Cave (1789) 3 TR 148 is an English contract law case, which stands for the proposition that an auctioneer's request for bids is not an offer but an invitation to treat. The bidders make the offers which can be accepted by the auctioneer.

== Facts ==
Mr Cave had made the highest bid for a good in an auction. But then, Mr Cave changed his mind and he withdrew his bid before the auctioneer brought down his hammer.

It was held that Mr. Cave, the defendant, was not bound to purchase the goods. His bid amounted to an offer which he was entitled to withdraw at any time before the auctioneer signified acceptance by knocking down the hammer. Note: The common law rule laid down in this case has now been codified in many countries in variations of the Sale of Goods Act, e.g. UK 1979 s57(2).

== Judgment ==
The court held that Mr Cave was entitled to withdraw his offer at any time before the auctioneer accepted it. The auctioneer's request for bids was an invitation to treat, and each bid constituted an offer which could be withdrawn at any time until it's accepted, and finally, the fall of the auctioneer's hammer constituted acceptance of the highest bid.

== Significance ==
Barry v Davies qualified Payne by ruling that if the auction is advertised as being "without a reserve price", then the auctioneer is bound to sell to the highest bona fide bidder (and not the seller himself, as attempted in Warlow v Harrison). Also, the Sale of Goods Act 1979, s 57 states that if an auction is held without any reserve, then the auctioneer must accept the highest bid (this was subsequently applied in Barry v Davies).

In opening a contract class at Harvard Law School in the autumn of 1870, Professor Christopher Columbus Langdell, instead of the traditional didactic approach of lecturing a hall of students, pointed to a student and asked, “Mr. Fox, will you state the facts of Payne v Cave?”, then, “Mr. Rawle will you give the plaintiff’s argument?” He replied to answers in the Socratic method, with “could you suggest a reason?”. This became known as the case method of legal study, which is followed around most of the common law world today.

== See also ==
- Invitatio ad offerendum
