= Invitation to treat =

Term in contract law

An invitation to treat (or invitation to bargain in the United States) is a concept within contract law which comes from the Latin phrase invitatio ad offerendum, meaning "inviting an offer". According to Professor Andrew Burrows, an invitation to treat is

an expression of willingness to negotiate. A person making an invitation to treat does not intend to be bound as soon as it is accepted by the person to whom the statement is addressed.

Sometimes a person may not offer to sell their goods, but makes some statement or gives some information with a view to inviting others to make offers on the basis. Likewise, inviting persons to an auction, where goods to be auctioned are displayed, is not an offer for the sale of goods. The offer is made by the intending buyers in the form of bid. Such an offer (bid), when accepted by the fall of hammer or in some other customary way, will result in a (binding) contract. A contract is a legally binding voluntary agreement formed when one person makes an offer, and the other accepts it. There may be some preliminary discussion before an offer is formally made. Such pre-contractual representations may include "invitations to treat", "requests for information" or "statements of intention".

True offers may be accepted to form a contract, whereas representations such as invitations to treat may not. However, although an invitation to treat cannot be accepted it should not be ignored, for it may nevertheless affect the offer. For example, where an offer is made in response to an invitation to treat, the offer may incorporate the terms of the invitation to treat (unless the offer expressly incorporates different terms). If, as in the Boots case (described below) the offer is made by an action without any negotiations—such as presenting goods to a cashier—the offer will be presumed to be on the terms of the invitation to treat.

== Case law ==
Generally, advertisements are not offers but invitations to treat, so the person advertising is not compelled to sell. In Partridge v Crittenden [1968] 1 WLR 1204, a defendant who was charged with "offering for sale protected birds"—bramblefinch cocks and hens that he had advertised for sale in a newspaper—was not offering to sell them. Lord Parker CJ said it did not make business sense for advertisements to be offers, as the person making the advertisement may find himself in a situation where he would be contractually obliged to sell more goods than he actually owned.

In certain circumstances called unilateral contracts, an advertisement can be an offer; as in Carlill v Carbolic Smoke Ball Company [1893] 1 QB 256, where it was held that the defendants, who advertised that they would pay £100 to anyone who sniffed a smoke ball in the prescribed manner and yet caught influenza, were contractually obliged to pay £100 to whoever accepted it by performing the required acts.

A display of goods for sale in a shop window or within a shop is an invitation to treat, as in the Boots case, a leading case concerning supermarkets. The shop owner is thus not obliged to sell the goods, even if signage such as "special offer" accompanies the display. Also, in Fisher v Bell [1961] 1 QB 394, the display of a flick knife for sale in a shop did not contravene legislation which prohibited "offering for sale an offensive weapon". If a shop mistakenly displays an item for sale at a very low price it is not obliged to sell it for that amount.

For an offer to be capable of becoming binding on acceptance, the offer must be definite, clear, and objectively intended to be capable of acceptance.

The tender process is a debated issue. In the case of Spencer v Harding, the defendants offered to sell stock by tender, but the court held that there was no promise to sell to the highest bidder, merely an invitation for offers which they could then accept or reject at will. In exceptional circumstances, an invitation for tenders may be an offer, as in Harvela Investments v Royal Trust of Canada [1986], where the court held that because defendants had made clear an intention to accept the highest tender, then the invitation to tender was an offer accepted by the person making the highest tender. The Harvela case also made it clear that "referential bids" (e.g. "$2,100,000 or $101,000 in excess of any other offer which you may receive, whichever is the higher", as in the Harvela case) are void as being contrary to public policy.

== Auctions ==
In England, auctions are governed by the Sale of Goods Act 1979 (as amended). Section 57(2) provides: "A sale by auction is complete when the auctioneer announces its completion by the fall of the hammer, or in other customary manner. Until the announcement is made any bidder may retract his bid." S. 57(3) provides further: "An auction sale may be subject to a reserve price". However, if the auction is held without reserve then the auctioneer is obliged to sell to the highest bidder. It is implicit from Payne v Cave (1789), an early case concerning auctions, that each bid is deemed to expire when others make higher bids; but some auctioneers (such as eBay) have lawfully amended this presumption so that, should a higher bidder withdraw his bid, they may accept a lower one.

== See also ==
- Offer and acceptance
- Bait-and-switch
