= Eric Blain =

British barrister and High Court judg

Sir Eric Herbert Blain (7 May 1904 – 19 November 1969) was a British barrister and High Court judge who sat in the Queen's Bench Division from 1965 until his death.

Blain was the only child of the safety campaigner and political agent Sir Herbert Edwin Blain and Clara Louisa Blake, daughter of John Netterville Blake, barrister-at-law. Educated at Uppingham School and King's College, Cambridge, he was called to the Bar by the Middle Temple in 1927. During the Second World War, he served with the Suffolk Regiment and the General Staff, reaching the rank of lieutenant-colonel.

The "acknowledged leader of the Parliamentary Bar", Blain was elected a Bencher of the Middle Temple in 1957 and was appointed a Queen's Counsel in 1961. He was a Judge of the Court of Appeal of the Bailiwick of Guernsey and of the Court of Appeal of the Island of Jersey from 1964 to 1965.

In 1965, he was appointed to the High Court and was assigned to the Queen's Bench Division, receiving the customary knighthood. He died at Ruthin, Denbighshire four years later, in 1969.

Blain married in 1930 Dulcie Hylda (‘ Bunty’), only daughter of R. W. Paton, of Bishop's Stortford.
