= Carlill v Carbolic Smoke Ball Co =

English contract law case

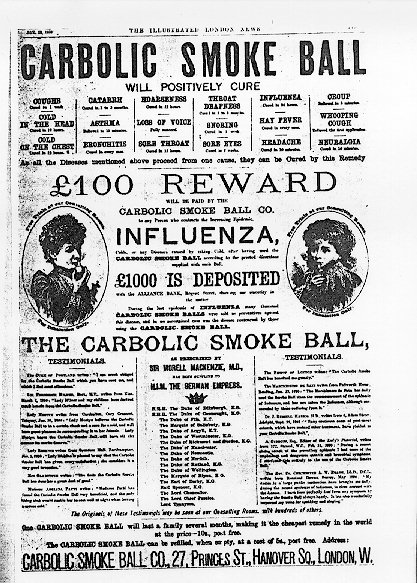
- Court: Court of Appeal
- Full case name: Louisa Carlill v Carbolic Smoke Ball Company
- Decided: 7 December 1892
- Citations: [1892] EWCA Civ 1, [1893] 1 QB 256 (CA)

Case history
- Prior action: Carlill v Carbolic Smoke Ball Co [1892] 2 QB 484 (QBD)
- Subsequent action: none

Court membership
- Judges sitting: Lindley, Bowen and AL Smith

Case opinions
- All three Lords Justices of Appeal

Keywords
- Advertisements, Conditions, Insurance, Offer and acceptance, Wagering contracts

Carlill v Carbolic Smoke Ball Company [1893] 1 QB 256 is an English contract law decision by the Court of Appeal, which held an advertisement containing certain terms to get a reward constituted a binding unilateral offer that could be accepted by anyone who performed its terms. It is notable for its treatment of contract and of puffery in advertising, for its curious subject matter associated with medical quackery, and how the influential judges (particularly Lindley and Bowen) developed the law in inventive ways. Carlill is frequently discussed as an introductory contract case, often one of the first cases a law student studies in the law of contract.

The case concerned a purported flu remedy called the "carbolic smoke ball". The manufacturer advertised that buyers who found it did not work would be awarded £100, a considerable amount of money at the time (equivalent to over £11,000 in 2026). The company was found to have been bound by its advertisement, which was construed as an offer which the buyer, by using the smoke ball, accepted, creating a contract. The Court of Appeal held the essential elements of a contract were all present, including offer and acceptance, consideration and an intention to create legal relations.

== Facts ==
The Carbolic Smoke Ball Co. made a product called the "smoke ball" and claimed it to be a cure for influenza and a number of other diseases. (The 1889–1890 pandemic ongoing at the time was estimated to have killed 1 million people, but may have been caused either by influenza or a coronavirus.) The smoke ball was a rubber ball with a tube attached. It was filled with carbolic acid (now known as phenol). The tube would be inserted into a user's nose and the ball would be squeezed at the bottom to release the vapours.

The Company published advertisements in the Pall Mall Gazette and other newspapers on November 13, 1891, stating that it would pay £100 (equivalent to £11,000 in 2025) to anyone who got sick with influenza after using its product according to the instructions provided with it:

£100 REWARD will be paid by the CARBOLIC SMOKE BALL CO. to any Person who contracts the Increasing Epidemic, INFLUENZA, Colds, or any Diseases caused by taking Cold, after having used the CARBOLIC SMOKE BALL according to the printed directions supplied with each Ball.

£1000 is deposited with the ALLIANCE BANK, Regent Street, shewing our sincerity in the matter.

During the last epidemic of INFLUENZA many thousand CARBOLIC SMOKE BALLS were sold as preventives against this disease, and in no ascertained case was the disease contracted by those using the CARBOLIC SMOKE BALL.

[...]

One CARBOLIC SMOKE BALL will last a family several months, making it the cheapest remedy in the world at the price—10s., post free. The ball can be refilled, when empty, at a cost of 5s. Address: CARBOLIC SMOKE BALL CO., 27, Princes St., Hanover Square, London, W.

Louisa Elizabeth Carlill saw the advertisement, bought one of the balls and used it three times daily for nearly two months until she contracted the flu on 17 January 1892. She claimed £100 from the Carbolic Smoke Ball Company. They ignored two letters from her husband, a solicitor. On a third request for her reward, they replied with an anonymous letter that if it is used properly the company had complete confidence in the smoke ball's efficacy, but "to protect themselves against all fraudulent claims", they would need her to come to their office to use the ball each day and be checked by the secretary. Carlill sued for breach of contract, her counsel arguing that the advertisement and her reliance on it amounted to a binding contract between her and the company, and that the company should therefore pay the promised £100. The company argued that they had made no legally binding offer which was capable of acceptance, and thus there could be no contract.

== Judgment ==
The Carbolic Smoke Ball Company, represented by H. H. Asquith, lost its argument at the Queen's Bench, which decision was then appealed. The Court of Appeal unanimously rejected the company's arguments and held that they had made a binding contract with Carlill. Among the reasons given by the three judges were: (1) that the advertisement was not a unilateral invitation to treat to all the world, but rather an offer restricted to those who acted upon the terms set out in the advertisement; (2) that satisfying the stated conditions for using the smoke ball constituted acceptance of the offer; (3) that purchasing or merely using the smoke ball constituted good consideration, because it was a distinct detriment incurred at the behest of the company and, furthermore, more people buying smoke balls by relying on the advertisement was a clear benefit to Carbolic; and (4) that the company's claim that £1000 was deposited at the Alliance Bank showed the serious intention to be legally bound.

=== Lord Justice Lindley ===
Lindley gave the first judgment. He made short shrift of the insurance and wagering contract arguments that were dealt with in the Queen's Bench.

I will begin by referring to two points which were raised in the Court below. I refer to them simply for the purpose of dismissing them. First, it is said no action will lie upon this contract because it is a policy. You have only to look at the advertisement to dismiss that suggestion. Then it was said that it is a bet. Hawkins, J., came to the conclusion that nobody ever dreamt of a bet, and that the transaction had nothing whatever in common with a bet. I so entirely agree with him that I pass over this contention also as not worth serious attention.

Then, what is left? The first observation I will make is that we are not dealing with any inference of fact. We are dealing with an express promise to pay £100 in certain events. Read the advertisement how you will, and twist it about as you will, here is a distinct promise expressed in language which is perfectly unmistakable —

“£100 reward will be paid by the Carbolic Smoke Ball Company to any person who contracts the influenza after having used the ball three times daily for two weeks according to the printed directions supplied with each ball.”

He follows on with essentially five points. First, the advertisement was not "mere puff" as had been alleged by the company, because the deposit of £1000 in the bank evidenced seriousness. Second, the advertisement was an offer made specifically to anyone who performed the conditions in the advertisement rather than a statement "not made with anybody in particular." Third, communication of acceptance is not necessary for a contract when people's conduct manifests an intention to contract. Fourth, that the vagueness of the advertisement's terms was no insurmountable obstacle. And fifth, the nature of Carlill's consideration (what she gave in return for the offer) was good, because there is both an advantage in additional sales in reaction to the advertisement and a "distinct inconvenience" that people go to when using a smoke ball.

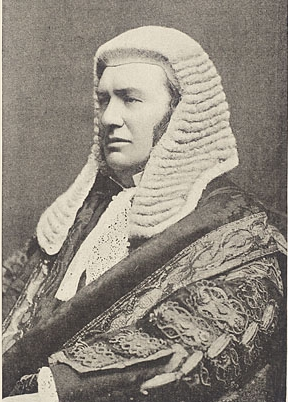
Lord Justice Lindley was a prolific author, widely known for his work on partnership and company law.

We must first consider whether this was intended to be a promise at all, or whether it was a mere puff which meant nothing. Was it a mere puff? My answer to that question is No, and I base my answer upon this passage: “£1000 is deposited with the Alliance Bank, shewing [arch.] our sincerity in the matter.” Now, for what was that money deposited or that statement made except to negative the suggestion that this was a mere puff and meant nothing at all? The deposit is called in aid by the advertiser as proof of his sincerity in the matter — that is, the sincerity of his promise to pay this £100 in the event which he has specified. I say this for the purpose of giving point to the observation that we are not inferring a promise; there is the promise, as plain as words can make it.

Then it is contended that it is not binding. In the first place, it is said that it is not made with anybody in particular. Now that point is common to the words of this advertisement and to the words of all other advertisements offering rewards. They are offers to anybody who performs the conditions named in the advertisement, and anybody who does perform the condition accepts the offer. In point of law this advertisement is an offer to pay £100 to anybody who will perform these conditions, and the performance of the conditions is the acceptance of the offer. That rests upon a string of authorities, the earliest of which is Williams v Carwardine, which has been followed by many other decisions upon advertisements offering rewards.

But then it is said, “Supposing that the performance of the conditions is an acceptance of the offer, that acceptance ought to have been notified.” Unquestionably, as a general proposition, when an offer is made, it is necessary in order to make a binding contract, not only that it should be accepted, but that the acceptance should be notified. But is that so in cases of this kind? I apprehend that they are an exception to that rule, or, if not an exception, they are open to the observation that the notification of the acceptance need not precede the performance. This offer is a continuing offer. It was never revoked, and if notice of acceptance is required — which I doubt very much, for I rather think the true view is that which was expressed and explained by Lord Blackburn in the case of Brogden v Metropolitan Ry Co - if notice of acceptance is required, the person who makes the offer gets the notice of acceptance contemporaneously with his notice of the performance of the condition. If he gets notice of the acceptance before his offer is revoked, that in principle is all you want. I, however, think that the true view, in a case of this kind, is that the person who makes the offer shews by his language and from the nature of the transaction that he does not expect and does not require notice of the acceptance apart from notice of the performance.

We, therefore, find here all the elements which are necessary to form a binding contract enforceable in point of law, subject to two observations. First of all it is said that this advertisement is so vague that you cannot really construe it as a promise — that the vagueness of the language shews that a legal promise was never intended or contemplated. The language is vague and uncertain in some respects, and particularly in this, that the £100 is to be paid to any person who contracts the increasing epidemic after having used the balls three times daily for two weeks. It is said, When are they to be used? According to the language of the advertisement no time is fixed, and, construing the offer most strongly against the person who has made it, one might infer that any time was meant. I do not think that was meant, and to hold the contrary would be pushing too far the doctrine of taking language most strongly against the person using it. I do not think that business people or reasonable people would understand the words as meaning that if you took a smoke ball and used it three times daily for two weeks you were to be guaranteed against influenza for the rest of your life, and I think it would be pushing the language of the advertisement too far to construe it as meaning that. But if it does not mean that, what does it mean? It is for the defendants to shew what it does mean; and it strikes me that there are two, and possibly three, reasonable constructions to be put on this advertisement, any one of which will answer the purpose of the plaintiff. Possibly it may be limited to persons catching the “increasing epidemic” (that is, the then prevailing epidemic), or any colds or diseases caused by taking cold, during the prevalence of the increasing epidemic. That is one suggestion; but it does not commend itself to me. Another suggested meaning is that you are warranted free from catching this epidemic, or colds or other diseases caused by taking cold, whilst you are using this remedy after using it for two weeks. If that is the meaning, the plaintiff is right, for she used the remedy for two weeks and went on using it till she got the epidemic. Another meaning, and the one which I rather prefer, is that the reward is offered to any person who contracts the epidemic or other disease within a reasonable time after having used the smoke ball. Then it is asked, What is a reasonable time? It has been suggested that there is no standard of reasonableness; that it depends upon the reasonable time for a germ to develop! I do not feel pressed by that. It strikes me that a reasonable time may be ascertained in a business sense and in a sense satisfactory to a lawyer, in this way; find out from a chemist what the ingredients are; find out from a skilled physician how long the effect of such ingredients on the system could be reasonably expected to endure so as to protect a person from an epidemic or cold, and in that way you will get a standard to be laid before a jury, or a judge without a jury, by which they might exercise their judgment as to what a reasonable time would be. It strikes me, I confess, that the true construction of this advertisement is that £100 will be paid to anybody who uses this smoke ball three times daily for two weeks according to the printed directions, and who gets the influenza or cold or other diseases caused by taking cold within a reasonable time after so using it; and if that is the true construction, it is enough for the plaintiff.

I come now to the last point which I think requires attention — that is, the consideration. It has been argued that this is nudum pactum - that there is no consideration. We must apply to that argument the usual legal tests. Let us see whether there is no advantage to the defendants. It is said that the use of the ball is no advantage to them, and that what benefits them is the sale; and the case is put that a lot of these balls might be stolen, and that it would be no advantage to the defendants if the thief or other people used them. The answer to that, I think, is as follows. It is quite obvious that in the view of the advertisers a use by the public of their remedy, if they can only get the public to have confidence enough to use it, will react and produce a sale which is directly beneficial to them. Therefore, the advertisers get out of the use an advantage which is enough to constitute a consideration.

But there is another view. Does not the person who acts upon this advertisement and accepts the offer put himself to some inconvenience at the request of the defendants? Is it nothing to use this ball three times daily for two weeks according to the directions at the request of the advertiser? Is that to go for nothing? It appears to me that there is a distinct inconvenience, not to say a detriment, to any person who so uses the smoke ball. I am of opinion, therefore, that there is ample consideration for the promise.

We were pressed upon this point with the case of Gerhard v Bates, which was the case of a promoter of companies who had promised the bearers of share warrants that they should have dividends for so many years, and the promise as alleged was held not to shew any consideration. Lord Campbell's judgment when you come to examine it is open to the explanation, that the real point in that case was that the promise, if any, was to the original bearer and not to the plaintiff, and that as the plaintiff was not suing in the name of the original bearer there was no contract with him. Then Lord Campbell goes on to enforce that view by shewing that there was no consideration shewn for the promise to him. I cannot help thinking that Lord Campbell's observations would have been very different if the plaintiff in that action had been an original bearer, or if the declaration had gone on to shew what a société anonyme was, and had alleged the promise to have been, not only to the first bearer, but to anybody who should become the bearer. There was no such allegation, and the Court said, in the absence of such allegation, they did not know (judicially, of course) what a société anonyme was, and, therefore, there was no consideration. But in the present case, for the reasons I have given, I cannot see the slightest difficulty in coming to the conclusion that there is consideration.

It appears to me, therefore, that the defendants must perform their promise, and, if they have been so unwary as to expose themselves to a great many actions, so much the worse for them.

=== Lord Justice Bowen ===
Bowen's opinion was more tightly structured in style, and is frequently cited. Five main steps in his reasoning can be identified. First, he said that the contract was not too vague to be enforced, because it could be interpreted according to what ordinary people would understand by it. He differed slightly from Lindley on what time period one could contract flu and still have a claim (Lindley said a "reasonable time" after use, while Bowen said "while the smoke ball is used"), but this was not a crucial point, because the fact was that Carlill got flu while using the smoke ball. Second, like Lindley, Bowen said that the advert was not mere puff because £1000 was deposited in the bank to pay rewards. Third, he said that although an offer was made to the whole world, the contract was not with the whole world. Therefore, it was not an absurd basis for a contract, because only the people who used it would bind the company. Fourth, he said that communication is not necessary to accept the terms of an offer; conduct is and should be sufficient. Fifth, good consideration was clearly given by Carlill because she went to the "inconvenience" of using it, and the company got the benefit of extra sales.

I am of the same opinion. We were asked by the counsel for the defendants to say that this document was a contract too vague to be enforced.

The first observation which arises is that the document itself is not a contract at all, it is only an offer made to the public. The defendants contend next, that it is an offer the terms of which are too vague to be treated as a definite offer, inasmuch as there is no limit of time fixed for the catching of the influenza, and it cannot be supposed that the advertisers seriously meant to promise to pay money to every person who catches the influenza at any time after the inhaling of the smoke ball. It was urged also, that if you look at this document you will find much vagueness as to the persons with whom the contract was intended to be made — that, in the first place, its terms are wide enough to include persons who may have used the smoke ball before the advertisement was issued; at all events, that it is an offer to the world in general, and, also, that it is unreasonable to suppose it to be a definite offer, because nobody in their senses would contract themselves out of the opportunity of checking the experiment which was going to be made at their own expense. It is also contended that the advertisement is rather in the nature of a puff or a proclamation than a promise or offer intended to mature into a contract when accepted. But the main point seems to be that the vagueness of the document shews that no contract whatever was intended. It seems to me that in order to arrive at a right conclusion we must read this advertisement in its plain meaning, as the public would understand it. It was intended to be issued to the public and to be read by the public. How would an ordinary person reading this document construe it? It was intended unquestionably to have some effect, and I think the effect which it was intended to have, was to make people use the smoke ball, because the suggestions and allegations which it contains are directed immediately to the use of the smoke ball as distinct from the purchase of it. It did not follow that the smoke ball was to be purchased from the defendants directly, or even from agents of theirs directly. The intention was that the circulation of the smoke ball should be promoted, and that the use of it should be increased. The advertisement begins by saying that a reward will be paid by the Carbolic Smoke Ball Company to any person who contracts the increasing epidemic after using the ball. It has been said that the words do not apply only to persons who contract the epidemic after the publication of the advertisement, but include persons who had previously contracted the influenza. I cannot so read the advertisement. It is written in colloquial and popular language, and I think that it is equivalent to this:

"£100 will be paid to any person who shall contract the increasing epidemic after having used the carbolic smoke ball three times daily for two weeks.”

And it seems to me that the way in which the public would read it would be this, that if anybody, after the advertisement was published, used three times daily for two weeks the carbolic smoke ball, and then caught cold, he would be entitled to the reward. Then again it was said: “How long is this protection to endure? Is it to go on for ever, or for what limit of time?” I think that there are two constructions of this document, each of which is good sense, and each of which seems to me to satisfy the exigencies of the present action. It may mean that the protection is warranted to last during the epidemic, and it was during the epidemic that the plaintiff contracted the disease. I think, more probably, it means that the smoke ball will be a protection while it is in use. That seems to me the way in which an ordinary person would understand an advertisement about medicine, and about a specific against influenza. It could not be supposed that after you have left off using it you are still to be protected for ever, as if there was to be a stamp set upon your forehead that you were never to catch influenza because you had once used the carbolic smoke ball. I think the immunity is to last during the use of the ball. That is the way in which I should naturally read it, and it seems to me that the subsequent language of the advertisement supports that construction. It says: “During the last epidemic of influenza many thousand carbolic smoke balls were sold, and in no ascertained case was the disease contracted by those using” (not “who had used”) “the carbolic smoke ball,” and it concludes with saying that one smoke ball will last a family several months (which imports that it is to be efficacious while it is being used), and that the ball can be refilled at a cost of 5s. I, therefore, have myself no hesitation in saying that I think, on the construction of this advertisement, the protection was to enure during the time that the carbolic smoke ball was being used. My brother, the Lord Justice who preceded me, thinks that the contract would be sufficiently definite if you were to read it in the sense that the protection was to be warranted during a reasonable period after use. I have some difficulty myself on that point; but it is not necessary for me to consider it further, because the disease here was contracted during the use of the carbolic smoke ball.

Was it intended that the £100 should, if the conditions were fulfilled, be paid? The advertisement says that 1000l. is lodged at the bank for the purpose. Therefore, it cannot be said that the statement that £100 would be paid was intended to be a mere puff. I think it was intended to be understood by the public as an offer which was to be acted upon.

But it was said there was no check on the part of the persons who issued the advertisement, and that it would be an insensate thing to promise £100 to a person who used the smoke ball unless you could check or superintend his manner of using it. The answer to that argument seems to me to be that if a person chooses to make extravagant promises of this kind he probably does so because it pays him to make them, and, if he has made them, the extravagance of the promises is no reason in law why he should not be bound by them.

It was also said that the contract is made with all the world — that is, with everybody; and that you cannot contract with everybody. It is not a contract made with all the world. There is the fallacy of the argument. It is an offer made to all the world; and why should not an offer be made to all the world which is to ripen into a contract with anybody who comes forward and performs the condition? It is an offer to become liable to any one who, before it is retracted, performs the condition, and, although the offer is made to the world, the contract is made with that limited portion of the public who come forward and perform the condition on the faith of the advertisement. It is not like cases in which you offer to negotiate, or you issue advertisements that you have got a stock of books to sell, or houses to let, in which case there is no offer to be bound by any contract. Such advertisements are offers to negotiate — offers to receive offers — offers to chaffer, as, I think, some learned judge in one of the cases has said. If this is an offer to be bound, then it is a contract the moment the person fulfils the condition. That seems to me to be sense, and it is also the ground on which all these advertisement cases have been decided during the century; and it cannot be put better than in Willes J.'s, judgment in Spencer v Harding. “In the advertisement cases,” he says,

“there never was any doubt that the advertisement amounted to a promise to pay the money to the person who first gave information. The difficulty suggested was that it was a contract with all the world. But that, of course, was soon overruled. It was an offer to become liable to any person who before the offer should be retracted should happen to be the person to fulfil the contract, of which the advertisement was an offer or tender. That is not the sort of difficulty which presents itself here. If the circular had gone on, ‘and we undertake to sell to the highest bidder,’ the reward cases would have applied, and there would have been a good contract in respect of the persons.”

As soon as the highest bidder presented himself, says Willes, J., the person who was to hold the vinculum juris on the other side of the contract was ascertained, and it became settled.

Then it was said that there was no notification of the acceptance of the contract. One cannot doubt that, as an ordinary rule of law, an acceptance of an offer made ought to be notified to the person who makes the offer, in order that the two minds may come together. Unless this is done the two minds may be apart, and there is not that consensus which is necessary according to the English law — I say nothing about the laws of other countries — to make a contract. But there is this clear gloss to be made upon that doctrine, that as notification of acceptance is required for the benefit of the person who makes the offer, the person who makes the offer may dispense with notice to himself if he thinks it desirable to do so, and I suppose there can be no doubt that where a person in an offer made by him to another person, expressly or impliedly intimates a particular mode of acceptance as sufficient to make the bargain binding, it is only necessary for the other person to whom such offer is made to follow the indicated method of acceptance; and if the person making the offer, expressly or impliedly intimates in his offer that it will be sufficient to act on the proposal without communicating acceptance of it to himself, performance of the condition is a sufficient acceptance without notification.

That seems to me to be the principle which lies at the bottom of the acceptance cases, of which two instances are the well-known judgment of Mellish, LJ, in Harris's Case, and the very instructive judgment of Lord Blackburn in Brogden v Metropolitan Ry Co, in which he appears to me to take exactly the line I have indicated.

Now, if that is the law, how are we to find out whether the person who makes the offer does intimate that notification of acceptance will not be necessary in order to constitute a binding bargain? In many cases you look to the offer itself. In many cases you extract from the character of the transaction that notification is not required, and in the advertisement cases it seems to me to follow as an inference to be drawn from the transaction itself that a person is not to notify his acceptance of the offer before he performs the condition, but that if he performs the condition notification is dispensed with. It seems to me that from the point of view of common sense no other idea could be entertained. If I advertise to the world that my dog is lost, and that anybody who brings the dog to a particular place will be paid some money, are all the police or other persons whose business it is to find lost dogs to be expected to sit down and write me a note saying that they have accepted my proposal? Why, of course, they at once look after the dog, and as soon as they find the dog they have performed the condition. The essence of the transaction is that the dog should be found, and it is not necessary under such circumstances, as it seems to me, that in order to make the contract binding there should be any notification of acceptance. It follows from the nature of the thing that the performance of the condition is sufficient acceptance without the notification of it, and a person who makes an offer in an advertisement of that kind makes an offer which must be read by the light of that common sense reflection. He does, therefore, in his offer impliedly indicate that he does not require notification of the acceptance of the offer.

A further argument for the defendants was that this was a nudum pactum - that there was no consideration for the promise — that taking the influenza was only a condition, and that the using the smoke ball was only a condition, and that there was no consideration at all; in fact, that there was no request, express or implied, to use the smoke ball. Now, I will not enter into an elaborate discussion upon the law as to requests in this kind of contracts. I will simply refer to Victors v Davies and Serjeant Manning's note to Fisher v Pyne, which everybody ought to read who wishes to embark in this controversy. The short answer, to abstain from academical discussion, is, it seems to me, that there is here a request to use involved in the offer. Then as to the alleged want of consideration. The definition of “consideration” given in Selwyn's Nisi Prius, 8th ed. p. 47, which is cited and adopted by Tindal CJ, in the case of Laythoarp v Bryant, is this:

“Any act of the plaintiff from which the defendant derives a benefit or advantage, or any labour, detriment, or inconvenience sustained by the plaintiff, provided such act is performed or such inconvenience suffered by the plaintiff, with the consent, either express or implied, of the defendant.”

Can it be said here that if the person who reads this advertisement applies thrice daily, for such time as may seem to him tolerable, the carbolic smoke ball to his nostrils for a whole fortnight, he is doing nothing at all — that it is a mere act which is not to count towards consideration to support a promise (for the law does not require us to measure the adequacy of the consideration). Inconvenience sustained by one party at the request of the other is enough to create a consideration. I think, therefore, that it is consideration enough that the plaintiff took the trouble of using the smoke ball. But I think also that the defendants received a benefit from this user, for the use of the smoke ball was contemplated by the defendants as being indirectly a benefit to them, because the use of the smoke balls would promote their sale.

Then we were pressed with Gerhard v Bates. In Gerhard v Bates, which arose upon demurrer, the point upon which the action failed was that the plaintiff did not allege that the promise was made to the class of which alone the plaintiff was a member, and that therefore there was no privity between the plaintiffs and the defendant. Then Lord Campbell went on to give a second reason. If his first reason was not enough, and the plaintiff and the defendant there had come together as contracting parties and the only question was consideration, it seems to me Lord Campbell's reasoning would not have been sound. It is only to be supported by reading it as an additional reason for thinking that they had not come into the relation of contracting parties; but, if so, the language was superfluous. The truth is, that if in that case you had found a contract between the parties there would have been no difficulty about consideration; but you could not find such a contract. Here, in the same way, if you once make up your mind that there was a promise made to this lady who is the plaintiff, as one of the public — a promise made to her that if she used the smoke ball three times daily for a fortnight and got the influenza, she should have 100l., it seems to me that her using the smoke ball was sufficient consideration. I cannot picture to myself the view of the law on which the contrary could be held when you have once found who are the contracting parties. If I say to a person, “If you use such and such a medicine for a week I will give you 5l.,” and he uses it, there is ample consideration for the promise.

=== Lord Justice Smith ===
A L Smith's judgment was more general and concurred with both Lindley and Bowen's decisions.

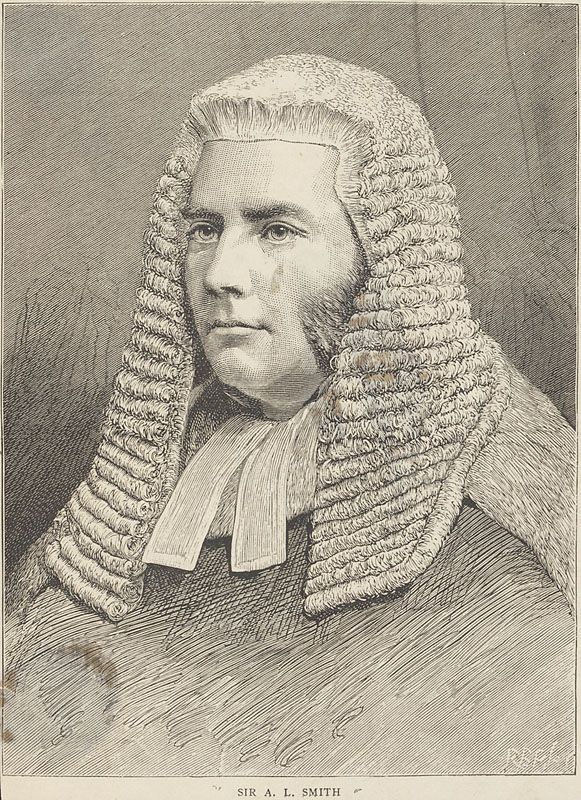
Sir A. L. Smith was the Master of the Rolls for a year before he died in 1901.

The first point in this case is, whether the defendants' advertisement which appeared in the Pall Mall Gazette was an offer which, when accepted and its conditions performed, constituted a promise to pay, assuming there was good consideration to uphold that promise, or whether it was only a puff from which no promise could be implied, or, as put by Mr. Finlay, a mere statement by the defendants of the confidence they entertained in the efficacy of their remedy. Or as I might put it in the words of Lord Campbell in Denton v Great Northern Ry. Co., whether this advertisement was mere waste paper. That is the first matter to be determined. It seems to me that this advertisement reads as follows:

“100l. reward will be paid by the Carbolic Smoke Ball Company to any person who after having used the ball three times daily for two weeks according to the printed directions supplied with such ball contracts the increasing epidemic influenza, colds, or any diseases caused by taking cold. The ball will last a family several months, and can be refilled at a cost of 5s.”

If I may paraphrase it, it means this: “If you” - that is one of the public as yet not ascertained, but who, as Lindley and Bowen, L.JJ., have pointed out, will be ascertained by the performing the condition — “will hereafter use my smoke ball three times daily for two weeks according to my printed directions, I will pay you 100l. if you contract the influenza within the period mentioned in the advertisement.” Now, is there not a request there? It comes to this: “In consideration of your buying my smoke ball, and then using it as I prescribe, I promise that if you catch the influenza within a certain time I will pay you 100l.” It must not be forgotten that this advertisement states that as security for what is being offered, and as proof of the sincerity of the offer, 1000l. is actually lodged at the bank where with to satisfy any possible demands which might be made in the event of the conditions contained therein being fulfilled and a person catching the epidemic so as to entitle him to the 100l. How can it be said that such a statement as that embodied only a mere expression of confidence in the wares which the defendants had to sell? I cannot read the advertisement in any such way. In my judgment, the advertisement was an offer intended to be acted upon, and when accepted and the conditions performed constituted a binding promise on which an action would lie, assuming there was consideration for that promise. The defendants have contended that it was a promise in honour or an agreement or a contract in honour — whatever that may mean. I understand that if there is no consideration for a promise, it may be a promise in honour, or, as we should call it, a promise without consideration and nudum pactum; but if anything else is meant, I do not understand it. I do not understand what a bargain or a promise or an agreement in honour is unless it is one on which an action cannot be brought because it is nudum pactum, and about nudum pactum I will say a word in a moment.

In my judgment, therefore, this first point fails, and this was an offer intended to be acted upon, and, when acted upon and the conditions performed, constituted a promise to pay.

In the next place, it was said that the promise was too wide, because there is no limit of time within which the person has to catch the epidemic. There are three possible limits of time to this contract. The first is, catching the epidemic during its continuance; the second is, catching the influenza during the time you are using the ball; the third is, catching the influenza within a reasonable time after the expiration of the two weeks during which you have used the ball three times daily. It is not necessary to say which is the correct construction of this contract, for no question arises thereon. Whichever is the true construction, there is sufficient limit of time so as not to make the contract too vague on that account.

Then it was argued, that if the advertisement constituted an offer which might culminate in a contract if it was accepted, and its conditions performed, yet it was not accepted by the plaintiff in the manner contemplated, and that the offer contemplated was such that notice of the acceptance had to be given by the party using the carbolic ball to the defendants before user, so that the defendants might be at liberty to superintend the experiment. All I can say is, that there is no such clause in the advertisement, and that, in my judgment, no such clause can be read into it; and I entirely agree with what has fallen from my Brothers, that this is one of those cases in which a performance of the condition by using these smoke balls for two weeks three times a day is an acceptance of the offer.

It was then said there was no person named in the advertisement with whom any contract was made. That, I suppose, has taken place in every case in which actions on advertisements have been maintained, from the time of Williams v Carwardine, and before that, down to the present day. I have nothing to add to what has been said on that subject, except that a person becomes a persona designata and able to sue, when he performs the conditions mentioned in the advertisement.

Lastly, it was said that there was no consideration, and that it was nudum pactum. There are two considerations here. One is the consideration of the inconvenience of having to use this carbolic smoke ball for two weeks three times a day; and the other more important consideration is the money gain likely to accrue to the defendants by the enhanced sale of the smoke balls, by reason of the plaintiff's user of them. There is ample consideration to support this promise. I have only to add that as regards the policy and the wagering points, in my judgment, there is nothing in either of them.

== Significance ==
Carlill is significant for two areas of law: the law of contract, and the doctrine of puffery. Both areas have impacted advertising, and the problem of medical quackery.

=== Law of contract ===
Carlill is frequently cited as a leading case in the common law of contract, particularly where unilateral contracts are concerned.

It provides an excellent study of the basic principles of contract and how they relate to everyday life. The case remains good law. It still binds the lower courts of England and Wales and is cited by judges with approval. However, in addition to the contractual remedy afforded to users, the same facts would give rise to a number of additional statutory remedies and punishments were an individual to place an advert in the same terms today.

Firstly, misleading advertising is a criminal offence. Under the Consumer Protection from Unfair Trading Regulations (secondary legislation, passed under the European Communities Act 1972), regulation 5 states that a commercial practice is misleading...

"if it contains false information and is therefore untruthful... or if it or its overall presentation in any way deceives or is likely to deceive the average consumer... even if the information is factually correct"

...in relation to a long list of actions and omissions by sellers. Misleading practices are unfair (r 3) and unfair practices are prohibited (r 4). They are also criminal offences (rr 8–18) and overseen by stringent enforcement mechanisms (rr 19–27). Sellers still have a defence of legitimate "puffery", or that their representations could not be taken seriously (e.g. "this washing powder makes your clothes whiter than white!").

Secondly, although it was not discussed in the case, there was evidence at the time that using the smoke ball actually made people more vulnerable to the flu (carbolic acid was put on the poisons register in 1900). The General Product Safety Regulations which are part of a European Union wide consumer protection regime (Directive 2001/95/EC) again provide criminal penalties for unsafe products.

Thirdly, the Consumer Protection Act 1987 (which is also part of EU wide regulation under Directive 85/374/EEC) creates a statutory tort of strict liability for defective products that cause any kind of personal injury or death, or damage over £100. This is the primary method for individuals to get compensation for any loss resulting from products. Similar regimes for product liability have developed around the world through statute and tort law since the early twentieth century, one of the leading cases being Donoghue v Stevenson.

Fourthly, under the Enterprise Act 2002, s 8, as in most developed countries, industry members form a trade associations. Businesses are expected to collectively regulate one another by drawing up Codes of Practice and have mechanisms for enforcement before tort or criminal law does.

Viewed with a modern eye, many have argued that Carlill should be seen as redolent of another era, not a foundational case in the law of contract. For instance, Professor Hugh Collins writes the following.

"The amusing circumstances of the case should not obscure the surprising extent to which the court was prepared to conceive social relations in terms of contracts. The parties to the alleged contract had never met or communicated with each other directly. Nor had they exchanged goods, money or services between themselves. The law of contract is used by the court as an instrument for discouraging misleading and extravagant claims in advertising and for deterring the marketing of unproven, and perhaps dangerous pharmaceuticals... The judges run through a shopping-list of questions: Was there a promise? Was the promise serious and intended to be acted upon? Was the promise sufficiently definite and certain? Was the promise accepted by the plaintiff? Did the plaintiff perform some action in exchange for the promise?... The generality and abstraction of the rules permit both the extensive utilization of [contract law] and its application to the case, without any discussion of such matters as the moral claims of the parties, the nature of the market for pharmaceuticals and the problems generated by misleading advertising... Its doctrinal integrity helps to achieve legitimacy, because the law can be presented as objective and neutral, not a matter of politics or preference, but a settled body of rules and principles, legitimated by tradition and routine observance, and applied impartially and fairly to all citizens."

Professor A. W. B. Simpson, in an article entitled 'Quackery and Contract Law' gave the background of the case as part of the scare arising from the Russian influenza pandemic of 1889–90. He points out that nobody knew what the flu actually was yet, nor how to prevent or cure it. After it was patented, the Carbolic Smoke Ball had in fact become rather popular in many esteemed circles including the Bishop of London who found it "has helped me greatly". The inventor, Frederick Roe, had advertised heavily when the epidemic hit London, which was getting extensive press coverage. But in the Pall Mall Gazette (just one instance where he put ads) there were many, many more quack remedies for misunderstood problems. Once the case had been decided by the Court of Appeal, it met with general approval, but especially so from the medical community. The Pharmaceutical Society of Great Britain had been fighting an ongoing battle against quack remedies, and had wanted specifically to get carbolic acid on the poisons register since 1882. Although without sympathy for the Carbolic Smoke Ball Company itself, Simpson casts doubt on whether Carlill was rightly decided.

"The analytical problems arose in a particularly acute form in the smoke ball case. Thus it seemed very peculiar to say that there had been any sort of agreement between Mrs. Carlill and the company, which did not even know of her existence until January 20, when her husband wrote to them to complain. There were indeed earlier cases permitting the recovery of advertised rewards; the leading case here was Williams v Carwardine, where a reward of £20 had been promised by a handbill for information leading to the conviction of the murderer of Walter Carwardine, and Williams, who gave such information, successfully sued to recover the reward. But this was long before the more modern doctrines had become so firmly embodied in legal thinking, and in any event the case was quite distinguishable. It concerned a reward, whereas Mrs. Carlill was seeking compensation. There could be at most only a few claimants for this, but there is no limit on the number of those who may catch influenza. Furthermore, the Carbolic Smoke Ball Company had had no chance to check the validity of claims, of which there could be an indefinite number; much was made of this point in the argument. But the judges were not impressed with these difficulties, and their attitude was no doubt influenced by the view that the defendants were rogues. They fit their decision into the structure of the law by boldly declaring that the performance of the conditions was the acceptance, thus fictitiously extending the concept of acceptance to cover the facts. And, since 1893, law students have been introduced to the mysteries of the unilateral contract through the vehicle of Carlill v Carbolic Smoke Ball Co. and taught to repeat, as a sort of magical incantation of contract law, that in the case of unilateral contracts performance of the act specified in the offer constitutes acceptance, and need not be communicated to the offeror."

In a much more recent American case from the Southern District of New York, Leonard v Pepsico, Inc, judge Kimba Wood wrote,

"Long a staple of law school curricula, Carbolic Smoke Ball owes its fame not merely to "the comic and slightly mysterious object involved" ... but also to its role in developing the law of unilateral offers."

Leonard had sued PepsiCo to receive a Harrier jet which had featured in a TV ad. Supposedly one might claim the jet if one had acquired sufficient "Pepsi Points" from buying the soft drink. It was held that Leonard could not claim the fighter jet, because the advertisement was not serious. Judge Wood distinguished the case on a number of different grounds from Carlill, including that an advertisement does not constitute a unilateral offer, and that the tone of the advertisement was clearly tongue-in-cheek.

== Aftermath ==
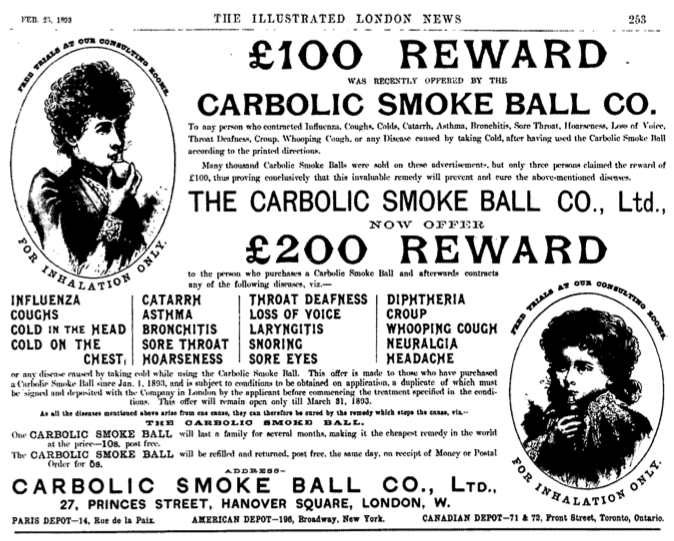
The Carbolic Smoke Ball Co actually increased its reward following the loss of the case.

After the action, Roe formed a new company with limited liability, and started up advertising again. Many people conclude after reading the case that the Carbolic Smoke Ball Company would have been brought down by thousands of claims. The company did not have limited liability, which could have meant personal ruin for Roe. In his submissions to the Court of Appeal, Finlay had used that as an argument against liability. He said that 10,000 people might now be sniffing at smoke balls hoping for their £100, and it would be a travesty to inflict insolvency on this one unfortunate company. But this did not happen at all. In a new advert on February 25, 1893, in the Illustrated London News, Roe cunningly turned the whole lost case to his advantage. He described the culpable advert, and then said,

"Many thousand Carbolic Smoke Balls were sold on these advertisements, but only three people claimed the reward of £100, thus proving conclusively that this invaluable remedy will prevent and cure the above mentioned diseases. The CARBOLIC SMOKE BALL COMPANY LTD. now offer £200 REWARD to the person who purchases a Carbolic Smoke Ball and afterwards contracts any of the following diseases..."

In the advertisement's small print were some restrictive conditions, with a period of 3 months to use the ball and claim, showing that legal advice had been adhered to. Roe left the management of the new company to other new subscribers and directors, who did not pursue such an aggressive advertising policy. By 1895 the company had fallen on harder times, and it had to be wound up in 1896. Simpson suggests that the new management "had failed to grasp the fact that vigorous advertising was essential to success in the field of quack medicine." Roe himself died at the age of 57 on June 3, 1899, of tuberculosis and valvular heart disease.

The unsuccessful defence counsel in the lower court, H. H. Asquith, went on to become Prime Minister of the United Kingdom.

Louisa Carlill lived until she was 96. She died on March 10, 1942, according to her doctor, Joseph M. Yarman, principally of old age. But there was one other cause noted: influenza.

== See also ==
- English contract law
- Invitation to treat
- Pollicitation in French Civil Law
