= Pratt Contractors Ltd v Palmerston North City Council =

- Court: High Court of New Zealand
- Full case name: Pratt Contractors Ltd v Palmerston North City Council
- Decided: 13 December 1994
- Citation: [1995] 1 NZLR 469

Court membership
- Judge sitting: Gallen J

Pratt Contractors Ltd v Palmerston North City Council [1995] 1 NZLR 469 is a cited case in New Zealand regarding contract formation involving tenders.

== Background ==
The Palmerston North City Council put out for tender the construction of a flyover. The tender documents set out detailed criteria and plans for the construction of the flyover, and was to be awarded to the lowest tenderer.

However, a rival contractor submitted a tender for the construction of a redesigned flyover that involved less earth works, and the council subsequently accepted that tender, without giving the other tenderers the opportunity to submit a tender for the new design.

After discovering all this, Pratt Contractors sued the council for damages for loss of the profits they would have received if they had won the tender.

== Held ==
The court held that the city council tender was a legally binding obligation, and as a result the city council should have given Pratt Contractors the opportunity to revise and resubmit their tender. The court awarded damages of $17,822 for reimbursement of the costs in preparing the tender. On top of this, damages for $200,000 for loss of profit was also awarded.

Footnote: The judge noted that the council could have alternatively accepted none of the tenders instead.

In Pratt Contractors Ltd v Transit New Zealand (2003), the Privy Council noted its awareness that Pratt had been successful in its challenge in this case against Palmerston North.
