= Pharmaceutical Society of GB v Boots Cash Chemists (Southern) Ltd =

English contract law decision

Pharmaceutical Society of v Boots
- Court: Court of Appeal
- Full case name: Pharmaceutical Society of Great Britain v Boots Cash Chemists (Southern) Ltd
- Decided: 5 February 1953
- Citations: EWCA Civ 6, [1953] 1 QB 401, [1953] 1 All ER 482, [1953] 2 WLR 427

Court membership
- Judges sitting: Somervell LJ, Birkett LJ and Romer LJ

Keywords
- offer, invitation to treat, display of goods for sale, self-service

Pharmaceutical Society of Great Britain v Boots Cash Chemists (Southern) Ltd [1953] EWCA Civ 6 is a famous English contract law decision on the nature of an offer. The court held that the display of a product in a store with a price attached is not sufficient to be considered an offer, and upheld the concept of an invitation to treat.

== Facts ==
Boots Cash Chemists had just instituted a new way for its customers to buy certain medicines. Shoppers could now pick drugs off the shelves in the chemist and then pay for them at the till. Before then, all medicines were stored behind a counter meaning a shop employee would get what was requested. The Pharmaceutical Society of Great Britain objected and argued that under the Pharmacy and Poisons Act 1933, that was an unlawful practice. Under s 18(1), a pharmacist needed to supervise at the point where "the sale is effected" when the product was one listed on the 1933 Act's schedule of poisons. The Society argued that displays of goods were an "offer" and when a shopper selected and put the drugs into their shopping basket, that was an "acceptance", the point when the "sale is effected"; as no pharmacist had supervised the transaction at this point, Boots was in breach of the Act. Boots argued that the sale was effected only at the tills.

== Judgment ==
Both the Queen's Bench Division of the High Court and the Court of Appeal sided with Boots. They held that the display of goods was not an offer. Rather, by placing the goods into the basket, it was the customer that made the offer to buy the goods. This offer could be either accepted or rejected by the pharmacist at the cash desk. The moment of the completion of contract was at the cash desk, in the presence of the supervising pharmacist. Therefore, there was no violation of the Act.

Somervell LJ said,

Whether that is a right view depends on what are the legal implications of this layout, the invitation to the customer. Is it to be regarded as an offer which is completed and both sides bound when the article is put into the receptacle, or is it to be regarded as a more organised way of doing what is done already in many types of shops — and a bookseller is perhaps the best example - namely, enabling customers to have free access to what is in the shop to look at the different articles and then, ultimately, having got the ones which they wish to buy, coming up to the assistant and saying "I want this"? The assistant in 999 times out of 1,000 says "That is all right", and the money passes and the transaction is completed. I agree entirely with what the Lord Chief Justice says and the reasons he gives for his conclusion that in the case of the ordinary shop, although goods are displayed and it is intended that customers should go and choose what they want, the contract is not completed until, the customer having indicated the articles which he needs, the shop-keeper or someone on his behalf accepts that offer. Then the contract is completed. I can see no reason at all, that being I think clearly the normal position, for drawing any different implication as a result of this layout. The Lord Chief Justice, I think, expressed one of the most formidable difficulties in the way of the suggestion when he pointed out that, if the Plaintiffs are right, once an article has been placed in the receptacle the customer himself is bound and he would have no right without paying for the first article to substitute an article which he saw later of the same kind and which he perhaps preferred. I can see no reason for implying from this arrangement which the Defendants have referred to any implication other than that which the Lord Chief Justice found in it, namely, that it is a convenient method of enabling customers to see what there is and choose and possibly put back and substitute articles which they wish to have and then go up to the cashier and offers to buy what they have so far chosen. On that conclusion the case fails, because it is admitted that then there was supervision in the sense required by the Act and at the appropriate moment of time. For these reasons, in my opinion, the appeal should be dismissed.

Birkett LJ followed on by saying,

The short point of the matter was, at what point of time did the sale in this particular shop at Edgware take place? My Lord has explained the system which has been introduced into that shop (and possibly other shops since) in March 1951. The two ladies in this case, Miss Mainwaring and Miss Marrable, who went into that shop, each took a particular package containing poison from the particular shelf, put it into their basket, came to the exit and there paid. It is said upon the one hand that when the customer takes the package from the poison section and puts it into her basket the sale there and then takes place, On the other hand, it is said the sale does not take place until that customer who has placed that package in the basket comes to the exit.

The Lord Chief Justice dealt with the matter in this way, and I would like to adopt these words:

"It seems to me therefore, applying common sense to this class of transaction, there is no difference merely because a self-service is advertised. It is no different really from the normal transaction in a shop. I am quite satisfied it would be wrong to say the shopkeeper is making an offer to sell every article in the shop to any person who might come in and that he can insist by saying 'I accept your offer'".

Then he goes on to deal with the illustration of the bookshop and continues:

"Therefore, in my opinion, the mere fact that a customer picks up a bottle of medicine from the shelves in this case does not amount to an acceptance of an offer to sell. It is an offer by the customer to buy. I daresay this case is one of great importance, it is quite a proper case for the Pharmaceutical Society to bring, but I think I am bound to say in this case the sale was made under the supervision of a pharmacist. By using the words 'The sale is effected by, or under the supervision of, a registered pharmacist', it seems to me the sale might be effected by somebody not a pharmacist. If it be under the supervision of a pharmacist, the pharmacist can say 'You cannot have that. That contains poison'. In this case I decide, first that there is no sale effected merely by the purchaser taking up the article. There is no sale until the buyer's offer to buy is accepted by the acceptance of the money, and that takes place under the supervision of a pharmacist. And in any case, I think, even if I am wrong in the view I have taken of when the offer is accepted, the sale is by or under the supervision of a pharmacist".

I agree with that and I agree that this appeal ought to be dismissed.

== See also ==
- Contract
- Offer and acceptance
- Invitation to treat
