= Invitation to tender =

Business process

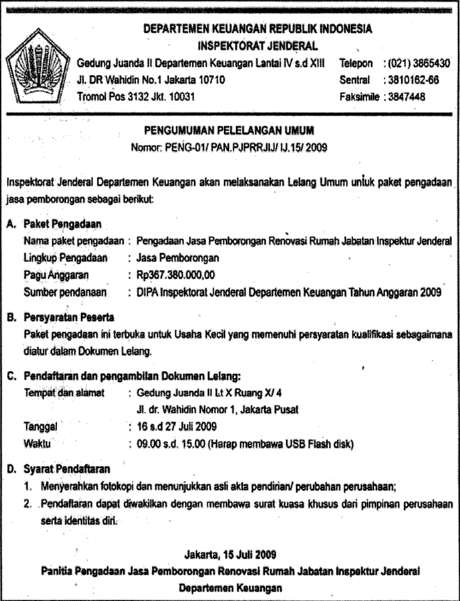
A tender announcement from the Indonesian Ministry of Finance

An invitation to tender (ITT, also known as a call for bids or a request for tenders) is a formal, structured procedure for generating competing offers from different potential suppliers or contractors looking to obtain an award of business activity in works, supply, or service contracts, often from companies who have been previously assessed for suitability by means of a supplier questionnaire (SQ) or pre-qualification questionnaire (PQQ).

Unlike a request for proposal (RFP), which is used when a company sources for business proposals, ITTs are used when a government or company does not require the submission of an original business proposal and is looking solely to award a contract based on the best tender submitted. As a result, whereas ITTs are often decided based on the best price offered, decisions on RFPs may also involve other considerations such as technology and innovation. Both are forms of reverse auction.

At the same time, variant bids may be requested in an ITT, which allow suppliers to offer proposals which differ in non-essential terms from the supplies or services requested. The European Commission has suggested that requesting variants is one way in which suppliers can be asked to offer more socially responsible solutions to meeting public needs, and they may provide a means of offering innovative solutions to client needs. The UK government has advised that where variant bids are invited, suppliers might also be asked to provide a compliant bid, which can be compared with other suppliers' compliant bids for evaluation purposes. The government's guidance on this matter also observes that submitting two bids in this manner "will increase suppliers' bid costs and may act as a disincentive to innovation".

Public sector organisations in many countries are legally obliged to release tenders for works and services. In the majority of cases, these are listed on their websites and traditional print media. Electronic procurement and tendering systems or e-procurement are also increasingly prevalent. The European Union states that 235,000 calls for tender are issued annually using its Tenders Electronic Daily system, including those issued by countries in the European Economic Area and beyond.

== Terminology ==
Various terms are used globally to refer to an invitation to tender. The term "notice inviting tenders" (NIT) is often used in India. The European Union's institutions often use the terms "calls for tenders" and "calls for expressions of interest". Other terms used in the United States include "Invitation for Bid" (IFB), or "Invitation to Bid" (ITB).

== Types ==
Open tenders (also known as open calls for tenders or advertised tenders) are open to all vendors or contractors who can guarantee performance. Restricted tenders (also known as restricted calls for tenders or invited tenders) are only open to selected pre-qualified vendors or contractors. The tender stage may form part of a two-stage process; the first stage comprises issuing an expression-of-interest (EOI) tender call, resulting in a shortlist of selected suitable vendors. The reasons for using restricted tenders differ in scope and purpose.

Sole source tenders involve only one potential supplier being invited to submit a tender. A sole source tender may be used where there is essentially only one suitable supplier of the services or product.

Tenders have a bid preparation period available to bidders. Research has shown that the length of this period might affect the number of bids and, as a result, the level of competition among tenderers. The interval between advertising a tender or inviting tender submissions, and the close of the bid preparation period, may be subject to regulation in public sector tendering. The European Commission has issued best practice guidelines which emphasise the need to allow suppliers adequate time for bid preparation including the time which small businesses might require to find partners for joint bidding and prepare an agreed bid.

== Process ==
=== Pre-qualification questionnaires ===
Supplier questionnaires or pre-qualification questionnaires ensure that potential suppliers are all asked the same information when assessing their suitability to be invited to tender or to have their tenders evaluated. Some organisations issue a standard pre-qualification questionnaire, for example the UK government has developed standard core PQQ questions which have been revised several times and are mandated for use across government, and has also stipulated that PQQs should not be used by central government contracting bodies when procuring goods or services valued less than the threshold values set by UK procurement legislation.

=== Tender box ===
A tender box is a mailbox used to receive the physical tender or bid documents, or a digital equivalent. The tender box is not implemented in every country around the world.

=== Tender validity date ===
A tender validity date is a date until which a tenderer commits to keeping their prices (and other tender details) open for acceptance (or otherwise) by the client. Such a date is usually included in a form of tender, either as a specified date or as the termination of a specified period from another key tender date. For example, in tendering for gym equipment in 2013, West Dunbartonshire Council required tenderers to accept that "Your tender shall remain open for acceptance for ninety (90) days from the date for return of tenders indicated above, or any subsequent date notified to you by us. Your tender may be accepted by us at any time during this period."

=== Tender evaluation ===
Tender evaluation methods vary depending on the procurement approach and solicitation format used by the contracting authority:

==== Lowest price ====
Lowest-price evaluation is one of the simplest and most traditional award methods, awarding the contract to the compliant bidder offering the lowest price. Depending on the tender structure, bids may be assessed on a total lump-sum basis, by individual items or lots, through total or percentage discounts off a price list, or against a predetermined budget ceiling. One of the options available is under rules applicable to government procurement in the European Union (EU).

==== Most economically advantageous ====
The term "most economically advantageous tender" ("MEAT") is applied when proposals of differing quality are evaluated within set limits. Under this the proposals are graded according to their price for value and the contract is awarded to the one with the best grade. Similar to this is the grading of the proposals according to time, making the proposals needing less time of implementation seem more valuable. This is also one of the options available under rules applicable to government procurement in the EU.

"Most economically advantageous tender" ("MEAT") became "Most Advantageous Tender" ("MAT") under the United Kingdom's Procurement Act 2023, signalling that value is to be treated as a broader and not exclusively "economic" matter: social and environmental benefits can also be taken into account when a tender is evaluated, and a project's expected contribution to economic growth can be considered in addition to a simple economic evaluation of costs and benefits.

==== Mean value ====
The contract is awarded to a bid close to the mean value of the proposals received. This may apply to procurements where numerous proposals are expected and there is a need for a market-representing value.

==== Exclusion of the extremes ====
Under this method the proposals that are deviating the most from the mass of the proposals are excluded and then the procedure continues with one of the above methods.

==== Evaluations which do not take account of price ====
Some evaluations ignore prices or impose a single price which all intending contractors are expected to charge. For example in the English High Court case of Croft House Care et al. v Durham County Council (2010), the Council's commissioning manager explained that allowing bidders offering home care services for older and disabled people to charge different prices and using the lower prices as a part of the tender evaluation process risked bidders being unable to recruit staff and deliver the services they had contracted for.

There are also many variants and/or combinations of these main methods.

=== Process contracts ===
There are cases where an invitation to tender creates or implies a contractual obligation on the part of the inviting body to comply with duties of fairness and good faith in how they conduct the tender process. For example:

- Under Canadian law, the existence of a "process contract" or "Contract A" is now a well-established principle. "Contract A" in Canadian legal practice is distinct from "Contract B", the contract to be awarded concerning the subject matter of the tender exercise.
- New Zealand law regarding "the circumstances in which the calling for tenders gives rise to a process contract" was reviewed in Transit New Zealand v Pratt Contractors Ltd. [2002] and summarised by the Court of Appeal in Prime Commercial Ltd. v Wool Board Disestablishment Company in 2006:
  [15] ... The primary rule is that a tender process involves simply an invitation to treat on the part of the party calling for tenders with no contractual obligation crystallising until an offer is accepted, see Shivas & Westmark Investments Ltd v BTR Nylex Holdings NZ Ltd & Ors [1997] 1 NZLR 318 (HC). But tender processes will sometimes create process contracts between the party calling for tenders and the tenderers, see for instance Blackpool & Fylde Aero Club Ltd v Blackpool Borough Council [1990] 1 WLR 1195 (CA) (Note: An English case) and Pratt Contractors Ltd v Palmerston North City Council [1995] 1 NZLR 469 (HC). As noted by this Court in Quay Stevedoring Services Ltd v ENZA Ltd CA214/00 15 November 2001, a party alleging a process contract must establish the "necessary elements" of offer and acceptance and intention to enter a binding contract. Where there is a process contract, the obligations under it on the party calling for tenders will, of course, depend upon what was agreed expressly or by implication. An assertion that the tendering party is not obliged to accept the highest or any offer must be respected but is not necessarily inconsistent with that party being subject to obligations as to the process by which tenders are to be evaluated. [16] Cases in which the Courts have concluded that there were process contracts have often involved very formal tender procedures with one or more of the following characteristics: registration of interest by tenderers; detailed specifications which tenders must comply with; a prescribed methodology (often detailed) for the evaluation of tenders; and an express or implied commitment to choose the successful tenderer based on such evaluation. We are not suggesting that process contracts can only come into effect in those circumstances. Indeed, the Blackpool & Fylde Aero Club case shows that this is not so. But the less formal the tender process, the less scope there is for implying any, or at least any onerous, obligations on the party calling for tenders.
- Several other relevant cases in English law are outlined by Fellowes in a 2010 article on the evolution of tender contracts.
- In a Northern Ireland case, Gerard Martin and others v Belfast Education and Library Board, Weatherup J referred to "an implied contract with implied terms of fairness and good faith". The Library Board's tender documents in this case gave rise to an obligation of fairness in how the Board conducted the tender process.

=== After evaluation ===
Upon completion of tender evaluation it is usual to award a contract, unless no satisfactory tenders have been received. Organisations seeking tenders may reserve in advance the option not to award a contract or to abandon the procedure.

Unsuccessful tenderers may choose to challenge a decision; their right to do so will vary by situation, but in a public procurement context, there is wide scope for challenge and rules operate to determine how evaluation and award decisions should be reviewed: see, for example, the Remedies Directives which apply to government procurement in the European Union. Durham University's Christos Tsinopoulos has observed that loosely-defined specifications will often generate bid challenges: "the more open the requirement, the more open the procurer is to litigation". Local government lawyer Peter Ware suggests that a general reluctance to incur reputational damage by challenging a decision had to some extent disappeared by the early 2020's, with unsuccessful bidders becoming more willing to challenge decisions and delay contract awards.

=== Post-tender negotiation ===
Post-tender negotiation involves negotiation between an intending buyer and seller after a seller's bid or tender has been submitted, usually to see whether any improvements in terms can be secured before a contract is signed.

Tender documents may refer in advance to the possibility or option to negotiate.

== See also ==
- Best Value
- Construction bidding
- Government procurement
- Request for information
- Request for qualifications
- Request for quotation
- Sources sought
- Strategic sourcing
- Pollicitation in French Civil Law
