= Re Imperial Land Co of Marseilles, ex p Harris =

In re Imperial Land Company of Marseilles, ex parte Harris
- Decided: 1872
- Citation: Law Rep. 7 Ch. App. 587

Court membership
- Judges sitting: Mellish LJ, Sir W. M. James

In re Imperial Land Company of Marseilles, ex parte Harris (1872) Law Rep. 7 Ch. App. 587, also known as Harris's case, is an English contract law case. It reconfirmed the postal rule of Adams v Lindsell (1818).

== Facts ==
Mr Lewis Harris, of 19 Suffolk Street, Dublin, posted a letter applying for shares in the company. It was received by the directors in their Lombard Street office in London. They appointed a committee which allotted 100 shares to him. The company secretary wrote back telling Mr Harris, and that 10% interest would be payable for the price of the shares not yet paid up. Before the letter arrived with Mr Harris, he had sent another letter saying actually, he did not want to accept any shares.

== Judgment ==
The court held that a contract was complete when the secretary posted the letter accepting the application for shares.

Mellish LJ ascribed the postal rule to the extraordinary and mischievous consequences which would follow if it were held that an offer might be revoked at any time until the letter accepting it had been actually received.

Moreover, where it is expressly or impliedly stated in the offer that you may accept the offer by posting a letter, the moment you post the letter the offer is accepted. You are bound from the moment you post the letter, not, as it is put here, from the moment you make up your mind on the subject.

Sir W. M. James concurred.

== See also ==
- Brogden v. Metropolitan Railway Company
- Brinkibon Ltd v Stahag Stahl und Stahlwarenhandelsgesellschaft mbH [1983] 2 AC 34
- Reporoa Stores v Treloar [1958] NZLR 177
- Meeting of minds
