= Household Fire and Carriage Accident Insurance Co Ltd v Grant =

1878 English contract law case on the postal rule

Household Fire Insurance Co v Grant
- Court: Court of Appeal
- Full case name: The Household Fire and Carriage Accident Insurance Company (Limited) v Grant
- Decided: 1 July 1879

Court membership
- Judges sitting: Thesiger LJ, Baggallay LJ and Bramwell LJ

Case opinions
- Thesiger LJ, Baggallay LJ and Bramwell LJ

Keywords
- postal rule

The Household Fire and Carriage Accident Insurance Company (Limited) v Grant (1878–79) LR 4 Ex D 216 is an English contract law case concerning the "postal rule". It contains an important dissenting judgment by Bramwell LJ, who wished to dispose of it.

== Facts ==
Mr Grant applied for shares in the Household Fire and Carriage Accident Insurance Company. The company allotted the shares to the defendant, and duly addressed to him, posting a letter containing the notice of allotment. The letter was lost in the post and he never received the acceptance. Later the company went bankrupt, and asked Mr Grant for the outstanding payments on the shares, which he refused saying there was no binding contract. The liquidator sued. The question was whether Mr Grant's offer for shares had been validly accepted and as such whether he was legally bound to pay.

== Judgment ==
Thesiger LJ for the majority held that there was a valid contract, because the rule for the post is that acceptance is effective even if the letter never arrives. He noted that anyone can opt out of the rule, and that even if it sometimes causes hardship, it would cause even more hardship to not have the rule. Once someone posts acceptance, he argued, there is a meeting of minds, and by doing that decisive act a contract should come into effect.

The acceptor, in posting the letter, has, to use the language of Lord Blackburn, in Brogden v Directors of Metropolitan Ry Co, “put it out of his control and done an extraneous act which clenches the matter, and shews beyond all doubt that each side in bound.” How then can a casualty in the post, whether resulting in delay, which in commercial transactions is often as bad as no delivery, or in non-delivery, unbind the parties or unmake the contract? To me it appears that in practice a contract complete upon the acceptance of an offer being posted, but liable to be put an end to by an accident in the post, would be more mischievous than a contract only binding upon the parties to it upon the acceptance actually reaching the offerer, and I can see no principle of law from which such an anomalous contract can be deduced.

There is no doubt that the implication of a complete, final, and absolutely binding contract being formed, as soon as the acceptance of an offer is posted, may in some cases lead to inconvenience and hardship. But such there must be at times in every view of the law. It is impossible in transactions which pass between parties at a distance, and have to be carried on through the medium of correspondence, to adjust conflicting rights between innocent parties, so as to make the consequences of mistake on the part of a mutual agent fall equally upon the shoulders of both. At the same time I am not prepared to admit that the implication in question will lead to any great or general inconvenience or hardship. An offerer, if he chooses, may always make the formation of the contract which he proposes dependent upon the actual communication to himself of the acceptance. If he trusts to the post he trusts to a means of communication which, as a rule, does not fail, and if no answer to his offer is received by him, and the matter is of importance to him, he can make inquiries of the person to whom his offer was addressed. On the other hand, if the contract is not finally concluded, except in the event of the acceptance actually reaching the offerer, the door would be opened to the perpetration of much fraud, and, putting aside this consideration, considerable delay in commercial transactions, in which despatch is, as a rule, of the greatest consequence, would be occasioned; for the acceptor would never be entirely safe in acting upon his acceptance until he had received notice that his letter of acceptance had reached its destination.

Upon balance of conveniences and inconveniences it seems to me, applying with slight alterations the language of the Supreme Court of the United States in Tayloe v Merchants Fire Insurance Co., more consistent with the acts and declarations of the parties in this case to consider the contract complete and absolutely binding on the transmission of the notice of allotment through the post, as the medium of communication that the parties themselves contemplated, instead of postponing its completion until the notice had been received by the defendant. Upon principle, therefore, as well as authority, I think that the judgment of Lopes, J., was right and should be affirmed, and that this appeal should therefore be dismissed.

Bramwell LJ gave a spirited dissent, concluding that acceptance should only be effective once it arrives (but see also an apropos 1974 case, The Brimnes).

The question in this case is not whether the post office was a proper medium of communication from the plaintiffs to the defendant. There is no doubt that it is so in all cases where personal service is not required. It is an ordinary mode of communication, and every person who gives any one the right to communicate with him, gives the right to communicate in an ordinary manner and so in this way and to this extent, that if an offer were made by letter in the morning to a person at a place within half an hour's railway journey of the offerer, I should say that an acceptance by post, though it did not reach the offerer till the next morning, would be in time. Nor is the question whether, when the letter reaches an offerer, the latter is bound and the bargain made from the time the letter is posted or despatched, whether by post or otherwise. The question in this case is different. I will presently state what in my judgment it is. Meanwhile I wish to mention some elementary propositions which, if carefully borne in mind, will assist in the determination of this case:

First. Where a proposition to enter into a contract is made and accepted, it is necessary, as a rule, to constitute the contract that there should be a communication of that acceptance to the proposer, per Brian CJ, and Lord Blackburn: Brogden v Metropolitan Railway Co

Secondly. That the present case is one of proposal and acceptance.

Thirdly. That as a consequence of or involved in the first proposition, if the acceptance is written or verbal, i.e., is by letter or message, as a rule, it must reach the proposer or there is no communication, and so no acceptance of the offer.

Fourthly. That if there is a difference where the acceptance is by a letter sent through the post which does not reach the offerer, it must be by virtue of some general rule or some particular agreement of the parties. As, for instance, there might be an agreement that the acceptance of the proposal may be by sending the article offered by the proposer to be bought, or hanging out a flag or sign to be seen by the offerer as he goes by, or leaving a letter at a certain place, or any other agreed mode, and in the same way there might be an agreement that dropping a letter in a post pillar box or other place of reception should suffice.

Fifthly. That as there is no such special agreement in this case, the defendant, if bound, must be bound by some general rule which makes a difference when the post office is employed as the means of communication.

Sixthly. That if there is any such general rule applicable to the communication of the acceptance of offers, it is equally applicable to all communications that may be made by post. Because, as I have said, the question is not whether this communication may be made by post. If, therefore, posting a letter which does not reach is a sufficient communication of acceptance of an offer, it is equally a communication of everything else which may be communicated by post, e.g., notice to quit. It is impossible to hold, if I offer my landlord to sell him some hay and he writes accepting my offer, and in the same letter gives me notice to quit, and posts his letter which, however, does not reach me, that he has communicated to me his acceptance of my offer, but not his notice to quit. Suppose a man has paid his tailor by cheque or banknote, and posts a letter containing a cheque or banknote to his tailor, which never reaches, is the tailor paid? If he is, would he be if he had never been paid before in that way? Suppose a man is in the habit of sending cheques and banknotes to his banker by post, and posts a letter containing cheques and banknotes, which never reaches. Is the banker liable? Would he be if this was the first instance of a remittance of the sort? In the cases I have supposed, the tailor and banker may have recognised this mode of remittance by sending back receipts and putting the money to the credit of the remitter. Are they liable with that? Are they liable without it? The question then is, is posting a letter which is never received a communication to the person addressed, or an equivalent, or something which dispenses with it? It is for those who say it is to make good their contention. I ask why is it? My answer beforehand to any argument that may be urged is, that it is not a communication, and that there is no agreement to take it as an equivalent for or to dispense with a communication. That those who affirm the contrary say the thing which is not. That if Brian, C.J., had had to adjudicate on the case, he would deliver the same judgment as that reported. That because a man, who may send a communication by post or otherwise, sends it by post, he should bind the person addressed, though the communication never reaches him, while he would not so bind him if he had sent it by hand, is impossible. There is no reason in it; it is simply arbitrary. I ask whether any one who thinks so is prepared to follow that opinion to its consequence; suppose the over is to sell a particular chattel, and the letter accepting it never arrives, is the property in the chattel transferred? Suppose it is to sell an estate or grant a lease, is the bargain completed? The lease might be such as not to require a deed, could a subsequent lessee be ejected by the would-be acceptor of the offer because he had posted a letter? Suppose an article is advertised at so much, and that it would be sent on receipt of a post office order. Is it enough to post the letter? If the word “receipt” is relied on, is it really meant that that makes a difference? If it should be said let the offerer wait, the answer is, may be he may lose his market meanwhile. Besides, his offer may be by advertisement to all mankind. Suppose a reward for information, information posted does not reach, some one else gives it and is paid, is the offerer liable to the first man?

It is said that a contrary rule would be hard on the would-be acceptor, who may have made his arrangements on the footing that the bargain was concluded. But to hold as contended would be equally hard on the offerer, who may have made his arrangements on the footing that his offer was not accepted; his non-receipt of any communication may be attributable to the person to whom it was made being absent. What is he to do but to act on the negative, that no communication has been made to him? Further, the use of the post office is no more authorized by the offerer than the sending an answer by hand, and all these hardships would befall the person posting the letter if he sent it by hand. Doubtless in that case he would be the person to suffer if the letter did not reach its destination. Why should his sending it by post relieve him of the loss and cast it on the other party. It was said, if he sends it by hand it is revocable, but not if he sends it by post, which makes the difference. But it is revocable when sent by post, not that the letter can be got back, but its arrival might be anticipated by a letter by hand or telegram, and there is no case to shew that such anticipation would not prevent the letter from binding. It would be a most alarming thing to say that it would. That a letter honestly but mistakenly written and posted must bind the writer if hours before its arrival he informed the person addressed that it was coming, but was wrong and recalled; suppose a false but honest character given, and the mistake found out after the letter posted, and notice that it was wrong given to the person addressed.

Then, as was asked, is the principle to be applied to telegrams? Further, it seems admitted that if the proposer said, “unless I hear from you by return of post the offer is withdrawn,” that the letter accepting it must reach him to bind him. There is indeed a case recently reported in the Times, before the Master of the Rolls, where the offer was to be accepted within fourteen days, and it is said to have been held that it was enough to post the letter on the 14th, though it would and did not reach the offerer till the 15th. Of course there may have been something in that case not mentioned in the report. But as it stands it comes to this, that if an offer is to be accepted in June, and there is a month's post between the places, posting the letter on the 30th of June will suffice, though it does not reach till the 31st of July; but that case does not affect this. There the letter reached, here it has not. If it is not admitted that “unless I hear by return the offer is withdrawn” makes the receipt of the letter a condition, it is to say an express condition goes for nought. If it is admitted, is it not what every letter says? Are there to be fine distinctions, such as, if the words are “unless I hear from you by return of post, &c.,” it is necessary the letter should reach him, but “let me know by return of post,” it is not; or if in that case it is, yet it is not where there is an offer without those words. Lord Blackburn says that Mellish LJ, accurately stated that where it is expressly or impliedly stated in the offer, “you may accept the offer by posting a letter,” the moment you post this letter the offer is accepted. I agree; and the same thing is true of any other mode of acceptance offered with the offer and acted on—as firing a cannon, sending off a rocket, give your answer to my servant the bearer. Lord Blackburn was not dealing with the question before us; there was no doubt in the case before him that the letter had reached. As to the authorities, I shall not re-examine those in existence before the British and American Telegraph Co. v. Colson But I wish to say a word as to Dunlop v Higgins; the whole difficulty has arisen from some expressions in that case. Mr Finlay's argument and reference to the case when originally in the Scotch Court has satisfied me that Dunlop v Higgins decided nothing contrary to the defendant in this case. Mellish, L.J., in Harris' Case, says, “That case is not a direct decision on the point before us.” It is true, he adds, that he has great difficulty in reconciling the case of the British and American Telegraph Co v Colson with Dunlop v Higgins I do not share that difficulty. I think they are perfectly reconcilable, and that I have shewn so. Where a posted letter arrives, the contract is complete on the posting. So where a letter sent by hand arrives, the contract is complete on the writing and delivery to the messenger. Why not? All the extraordinary and mischievous consequences which the Lord Justice points out in Harris' Case might happen if the law were otherwise when a letter is posted, would equally happen where it is sent otherwise than by the post. He adds that the question before the Lords in Dunlop v. Higgins was whether the ruling of the Lord Justice Clerk was correct, and they held it was. Now Mr. Finlay shewed very clearly that the Lord Justice Clerk decided nothing inconsistent with the judgment in the British and American Telegraph Co v Colson Since the last case there have been two before Vice-Chanceller Malins, in the earlier of which he thought it “reasonable,” and followed it. In the other, because the Lord Justices had in Harris' Case thrown cold water on it, he appears to have thought it not reasonable. He says, suppose the sender of a letter says, “I make you an offer, let me have an answer by return of post.” By return the letter is posted, and A. has done all that the person making the offer requests. Now that is precisely what he has not done. He has not let him “have an answer.” He adds there is no default on his part. Why should he be the only person to suffer? Very true. But there is no default in the other, and why should he be the only person to suffer? The only other authority is the expression of opinion by Lopes J, in the present case. He says the proposer may guard himself against hardship by making the proposal expressly conditioned on the arrival of the answer within a definite time. But it need not be express nor within a definite time. It is enough that it is to be inferred that it is to be, and if it is to be it must be within a reasonable time. The mischievous consequences he points out do not follow from that which I am contending for. I am at a loss to see how the post office is the agent for both parties. What is the agency as to the sender? merely to receive? But suppose it is not an answer, but an original communication. What then? Does the extent of the agency of the post office depend on the contents of the letter? But if the post office is the agent of both parties, then the agent of both parties has failed in his duty, and to both. Suppose the offerer says, “My offer is conditional on your answer reaching me.” Whose agent is the post office then? But how does an offerer make the post office his agent, because he gives the offerer an option of using that or any other means of communication.

I am of opinion that this judgment should be reversed. I am of opinion that there was no bargain between these parties to allot and take shares, that to make such bargain there should have been an acceptance of the defendant's offer and a communication to him of that acceptance. That there was no such communication. That posting a letter does not differ from other attempts at communication in any of its consequences, save that it is irrevocable as between the poster and post office. The difficulty has arisen from a mistake as to what was decided in Dunlop v Higgins, and from supposing that because there is a right to have recourse to the post as a means of communication, that right is attended with some peculiar consequences, and also from supposing that because if the letter reaches it binds from the time of posting, it also binds though it never reaches. Mischief may arise if my opinion prevails. It probably will not, as so much has been said on the matter that principle is lost sight of. I believe equal if not greater, will, if it does not prevail. I believe the latter will be obviated only by the rule being made nugatory by every prudent man saying, “your answer by post is only to bind if it reaches me.” But the question is not to be decided on these considerations. What is the law? What is the principle? If Brian CJ, had had to decide this, a public post being instituted in his time, he would have said the law is the same, now there is a post, as it was before, viz., a communication to affect a man must be a communication, i.e., must reach him.

== See also ==
- Agreement in English law
- Postal rule
