= Meeting of the minds =

Legal term

Meeting of the minds (also referred to as mutual agreement, mutual assent, or consensus ad idem) is a phrase in contract law used to describe the intentions of the parties forming the contract. In particular, it refers to the situation where there is a common understanding in the formation of the contract. Formation of a contract is initiated with a proposal or offer. This condition or element is considered a requirement to the formation of a contract in some jurisdictions.

== History ==
Richard Austen-Baker has suggested that the perpetuation of the idea of "meeting of minds" may come from a misunderstanding of the Latin term consensus ad idem, which actually means "agreement to the [same] thing". There must be evidence that the parties had each, from an objective perspective, engaged in conduct manifesting their assent, and a contract will be formed when the parties have met such a requirement.

== Concept in academic work ==
German jurist Friedrich Carl von Savigny is usually credited with developing the will theory of contract in his work System des heutigen Römischen Rechts (1840).

Sir Frederick Pollock is one person known for expounding the idea of a contract based on a meeting of minds, at which time it gained much support in the courts.

Oliver Wendell Holmes wrote in 1897 that a meeting of minds was really a fiction.

In the law of contract the use of moral phraseology led to equal confusion, as I have shown in part already, but only in part. Morals deal with the actual internal state of the individual's mind, what he actually intends. From the time of the Romans down to now, this mode of dealing has affected the language of the law as to contract, and the language used has reacted upon the thought. We talk about a contract as a meeting of the minds of the parties, and thence it is inferred in various cases that there is no contract because their minds have not met; that is, because they have intended different things or because one party has not known of the assent of the other. Yet nothing is more certain than that parties may be bound by a contract to things which neither of them intended, and when one does not know of the other's assent. Suppose a contract is executed in due form and in writing to deliver a lecture, mentioning no time. One of the parties thinks that the promise will be construed to mean at once, within a week. The other thinks that it means when he is ready. The court says that it means within a reasonable time. The parties are bound by the contract as it is interpreted by the court, yet neither of them meant what the court declares that they have said. In my opinion no one will understand the true theory of contract or be able even to discuss some fundamental questions intelligently until he has understood that all contracts are formal, that the making of a contract depends not on the agreement of two minds in one intention, but on the agreement of two sets of external signs — not on the parties' having meant the same thing but on their having said the same thing.

The English contracts scholar Richard Austen-Baker has suggested that the perpetuation of the concept into current times is based on a confusion of it with the concept of a consensus ad idem ("agreement to the same [thing]") which is an undoubted requirement of synallagmatic contracting, and that this confusion may be the result of recent ignorance of Latin.

== Use in case law ==
In Household Fire and Carriage Accident Insurance Co Ltd v Grant (1879) 4 Ex D 216, Thesiger LJ said, in the course of a judgment on the postal rule,

Now, whatever in abstract discussion may be said as to the legal notion of its being necessary, in order to the effecting of a valid and binding contract, that the minds of the parties should be brought together at one and the same moment, that notion is practically the foundation of English law upon the subject of the formation of contracts. Unless therefore a contract constituted by correspondence is absolutely concluded at the moment that the continuing offer is accepted by the person to whom the offer is addressed, it is difficult to see how the two minds are ever to be brought together at one and the same moment... But on the other hand it is a principle of law, as well established as the legal notion to which I have referred, that the minds of the two parties must be brought together by mutual communication. An acceptance, which only remains in the breast of the acceptor without being actually and by legal implication communicated to the offerer, is no binding acceptance.

In Carlill v Carbolic Smoke Ball Company [1893] 1 QB 256, Bowen LJ said,

One cannot doubt that, as an ordinary rule of law, an acceptance of an offer made ought to be notified to the person who makes the offer, in order that the two minds may come together. Unless this is done the two minds may be apart, and there is not that consensus which is necessary according to the English law - I say nothing about the laws of other countries - to make a contract.

In Balfour v Balfour [1919] 2 KB 571, Atkin LJ said,

Agreement between the parties must such that they have an intention to enter into contract having consensus ad idem i.e. meeting of mind should be there and it should be in the same sense while entering into contract.

In Baltimore & Ohio R. Co. v. United States (1923) the US Supreme Court said an implied in fact contract is,

an agreement ... founded upon a meeting of minds, which, although not embodied in an express contract, is inferred, as a fact, from conduct of the parties showing, in the light of the surrounding circumstances, their tacit understanding.

The reasoning is that a party should not be held to a contract that they were not even aware existed. A mutual promise between friends over simple personal matters should not be a situation where legal remedies are to be used. Equally, any such agreement where the obligation is primarily a moral one rather than a legal one should not be enforceable. It is only when all parties involved are aware of the formation of a legal obligation is there a meeting of the minds.

However, the awareness of a legal obligation is established, not through each party's subjective understanding of the terms, but on "objective indicators," based on what each party said and did.

Under the formalist theory of contract, every contract must have six elements: offer, acceptance, consideration, meeting of the minds, capacity and legality. Many other contracts, but not all types of contracts, also must be in writing and be signed by the responsible party, in an element called form.

== Vices of consent ==
Mutual assent is vitiated by actions such as fraud, undue influence, duress (see per minas), mutual mistake, or misrepresentation. This may render a contract void or unenforceable.

== See also ==
- Contract
- Offer and acceptance
- Agreement in English law
- Raffles v Wichelhaus
