= Byrne & Co v Leon Van Tienhoven & Co =

1880 English contract law case on revocation and the postal rule

Byrne v Van Tienhoven
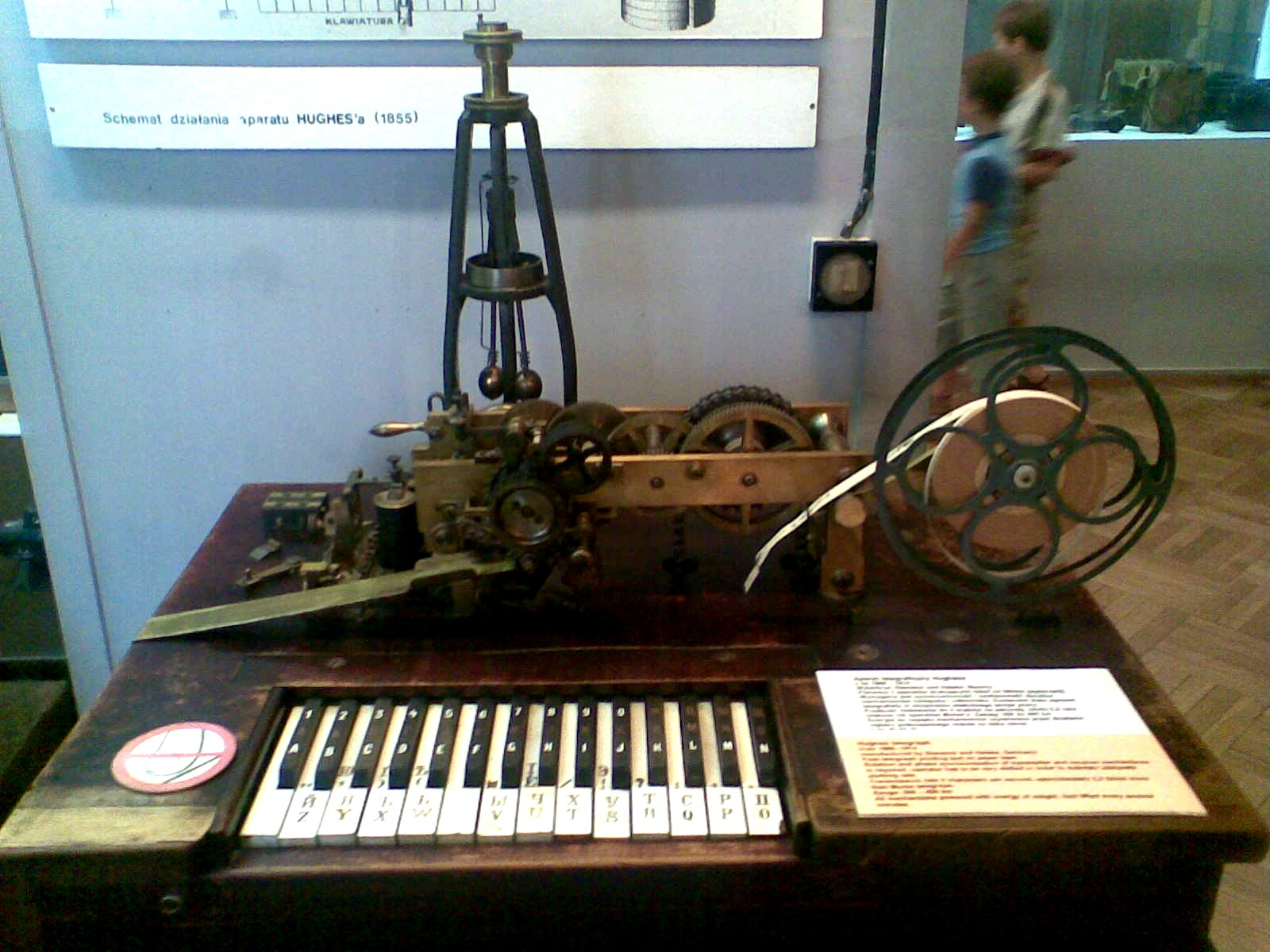
- Court: High Court Common Pleas Division
- Full case name: Byrne & Co v Leon Van Tienhoven & Co
- Citation: [1880] 5 CPD 344

Court membership
- Judge sitting: Lindley J

Keywords
- revocation, postal rule

Byrne & Co v Leon Van Tien Hoven & Co [1880] 5 CPD 344 is a leading English contract law case on the issue of revocation in relation to the postal rule. In it Lindley J of the High Court's Common Pleas Division ruled that an offer is only revoked by direct communication with the offeree, and that the postal rule does not apply in revocation; while simply posting a letter counts as a valid acceptance, it does not count as valid revocation.

== Facts ==
Van Tienhoven & Co posted a letter from their office in Cardiff to Byrne & Co in New York City, offering 1000 boxes of tinplates for sale on 1 October. Byrne and Co got the letter on 11 October. They telegraphed acceptance on the same day. But on 8 October Van Tienhoven had sent another letter withdrawing their offer, because tinplate prices had just risen 25%. They refused to go through with the sale.

== Consequences ==
Lindley J held that the withdrawal of the offer was not effective until it was communicated. His judgment stated the following:

There is no doubt an offer can be withdrawn before it is accepted, and it is immaterial whether the offer is expressed to be open for acceptance for a given time or not. The offer was posted on the 1st of October, the withdrawal was posted on the 8th, and did not reach the plaintiff until after he had posted his letter of the 11th accepting the offer. It may be taken as now settled that where an offer is made and accepted by letters sent through the post, the contract is completed the moment the letter accepting the offer is posted: Harris's Case; Dunlop v Higgins, even although it never reaches its destination. When, however, those authorities are looked at, it will be seen that they are based upon the principle that the writer of the offer has expressly or impliedly assented to treat an answer to him by a letter duly posted as a sufficient acceptance and notification to himself, or, in other words, he has made the post office his agent to receive the acceptance and notification of it. But this principle appears to me to be inapplicable to the case of the withdrawal of an offer. In this particular case I find no authority in fact given by the plaintiffs to the defendants to notify a withdrawal of their offer by merely posting a letter, and there is no legal principle or decision which compels me to hold, contrary to the fact, that the letter of the 8th of October is to be treated as communicated to the plaintiff on that day or on any day before the 20th, when the letter reached him... ...Before leaving this part of the case it may be as well to point out the extreme injustice and inconvenience which any other conclusion would produce. If the defendants’ contention were to prevail no person who had received an offer by post and had accepted it would know his position until he had waited such a time as to be quite sure that a letter withdrawing the offer had not been posted before his acceptance of it.

Lindley's judgment notes in part that the postal rule cases which he reviewed include an express or implied consent by an offeror to treat an answer duly sent by post as an acceptance.

== Rule of law ==
Revocation of an offer must be received and understood by the offeree before it comes into effect. An acceptance by the offeree before they receive notice of the revocation will be considered valid.

== See also ==
- Adams v Lindsell [1818] B & Ald 681
- Dickinson v Dodds [1876] 2 Ch D 463
- Henthorn v Fraser [1892] 2 Ch 27
