= R v Adams (South Africa) =

South African court case

R v Adams and Others
- Court: Special High Court, Pretoria
- Decided: March 29, 1961
- Verdict: Not guilty (All defendants acquitted)
- Citations: 1959 (1) SA 646 (A); 1959 (3) SA 753 (A)

Court membership
- Judges sitting: Justice F.L.H. Rumpff, Justice A.A. Kennedy, Justice J.F. Ludorf

Keywords
- Treason Trial, Apartheid, Freedom Charter, High treason

In R v Adams & Others, an important case in South African criminal procedure, the accused appeared on a charge of high treason.

The conspiracy alleged in a part of the charge was an implied agreement and the 'concert and common purpose' alleged in another part of the charge was also an implied agreement, both being sought to be inferred from the same facts.

The accused made an application for further particulars construing the terms of the agreement and furnishing details as to when or how, for example, steps were to be taken and by whom, for the achievement of the matters contemplated under various subparagraphs of the charge.

The court held that where there is a large number of accused and the record of the preparatory examinations is voluminous a wide reference in a charge to the record of the preparatory examination, not being limited in any way to the summary of facts, is wholly inadequate; and so is a reference to hundreds of speeches and thousands of documents, in which case the Crown will be ordered to indicate on which speech or document it seeks to rely in respect of each accused, where the Crown has the information which it refuses to give and such is necessary in order fairly to inform each accused what the case against him is.

Furthermore, the use of the particle 'and/or' in a charge may increase the need for further particulars but it is not necessarily embarrassing.
