= George Bramwell, 1st Baron Bramwell =

English judge (1808–1892)

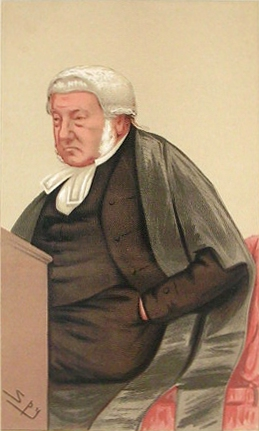
"The Exchequer" Judge Bramwell as caricatured by Spy (Leslie Ward) in Vanity Fair, January 1876

George William Wilshere Bramwell, 1st Baron Bramwell, PC, FRS (12 June 1808 – 9 May 1892), was an English judge.

== Early years ==
He was the eldest son of George Bramwell (1773–1858), a partner in the banking firm of Dorrien, Magens, Dorrien, & Mello; his mother Harriet is said to have been a woman of great strength of character, who attained the age of 96. Bramwell was born on 12 June 1808 in Finch Lane, Cornhill. At 12 years old he was sent to the Palace school in Enfield, kept by Dr. George May, where he was the school-fellow of William Fry Channell, his contemporary on the home circuit and his colleague in the court of exchequer. On leaving school he became a clerk in his father's bank.

In 1830, having married his first wife, Bramwell decided to enter the law, and became the pupil of Fitzroy Kelly. After practising for some years as a special pleader he was called to the bar by the Inner Temple in May 1838. He joined the home circuit, acquired a substantial junior practice, and built a good reputation.

In 1850, Bramwell was appointed a member of the common law procedure commission, the other members being Chief Justice Jervis, Baron Martin, Sir A. Cockburn, and Mr. (afterwards Mr. Justice) Willes. The result was the Common Law Procedure Act 1852. In 1851 Bramwell was made a Q.C., and in 1853 he served on the commission whose inquiries resulted in the Companies Act 1862.

== Silk and bench ==
In 1851 Lord Cranworth made Bramwell a Queen's counsel, and the Inner Temple elected him a bencher; he had ceased to be a member of Lincoln's Inn in 1841. In 1853 he served on the royal commission to inquire into the assimilation of the mercantile laws of Scotland and England and the law of partnership, which had as its result the Companies Act 1862. It was he who, during the sitting of this commission, suggested the addition of the word limited to the title of companies that sought to limit their liability, in order to prevent the obvious danger to persons trading with them in ignorance of their limitation of liability.

As a queen's counsel, Bramwell enjoyed a large and steadily increasing practice, and in 1856 he was knighted and raised to the bench as a Baron of the Exchequer. In 1867, with Mr. Justice Blackburn and Sir John Coleridge, he was made a member of the judicature commission. In 1871 he was one of the three judges who refused the seat on the judicial committee of the Privy Council to which Sir Robert Collier, in evasion of the spirit of the act creating the appointment, was appointed; and in 1876 he was raised to the court of appeal, where he sat until the autumn of 1881. As a judge, he was a great favourite of the Bar, due to his kindness and good humour, as well as his efficient dispatch of business.

== Retirement ==
Upon his retirement, announced in the long vacation of 1881, twenty-six judges and a huge gathering of the bar entertained him at a banquet in the Inner Temple hall. In December of the same year, he was raised to the peerage, taking the title Baron Bramwell, of Hever in the County of Kent, from his home in Kent, a title that became extinct on his death. He was elected a fellow of the Royal Society the same year.

== Private life ==
He was musical and fond of sports. He married twice: firstly in New York in 1830 to Jane (died 1836), daughter of Bruno Silva, a wealthy Portuguese-born businessman and his wife Charlotte Holling, by whom he had two daughters, Jane who lived until 1915, and Emma who died in infancy. He was married secondly in 1861 to Martha Sinden (died 1889). His younger brother, Sir Frederick Bramwell (1818–1903), was a well-known consulting engineer and expert witness. The judge once joked that witnesses could be divided into four categories: "liars, damned liars, expert witnesses and, of course, there's brother Fred".

At all times Lord Bramwell had been fond of controversy and controversial writing, and he wrote constant letters to The Times over the signature B. (he also signed himself at different times Bramwell, G. B. and L. L.). He joined in 1882 the Liberty and Property Defence League, and some of his writings after that date took the form of pamphlets published by that society.

== Judgments ==
- Blyth v Birmingham Waterworks Company (1856) 11 Ex Ch 781
- Warlow v Harrison (1858) 1 E1. & E1. 295
- Bamford v Turnley (1860) 3 B&S 62
- Rylands v Fletcher (1868) LR 3 HL 330
- Pattinson v Luckley (1875) LR 10 Ex 330
- Parker v South Eastern Railway [1877] 2 CPD 416 – English contract law on exclusion clauses holding that an individual cannot escape a contractual term by failing to read the contract, but that a party wanting to rely on an exclusion clause must take reasonable steps to bring it to the attention of the customer; Bramwell dissenting the decision of Mellish LJ and Baggallay LJ
- The Household Fire and Carriage Accident Insurance Company (Limited) v Grant (1878–79) LR 4 Ex D 216 – Contract law concerning the "postal rule", and containing an important dissenting judgment by Bramwell LJ, who wished to dispose of it.
- Ryder v Wombwell (L. R. 3 Ex. 95)
- R v Bradshaw (14 Cox C. C. 84)
- Stonor v Fowle (13 App. Cas. 20)
- The Bank of England v Vagliano Brothers (1891) AC
- Mogul Steamship Co Ltd v McGregor, Gow & Co [1892] AC 25

== Arms ==
Coat of arms of George Bramwell, 1st Baron Bramwell
Crest Two lions’ gambs in saltire Or supporting a sword in fess Proper. Escutcheon Per fess Ermine and Azure a pale counterchanged three griffins segreant one and two Argent. Motto Diligenter

Peerage of the United Kingdom
New creation	Baron Bramwell; 1882–1892	extinct
