= Xplor =

Xplor may refer to:

- Xplor International, an organization to facilitate the use of electronic documents
- X-PLOR and XPLOR-NIH, protein NMR software
- Xplor, a bi-monthly publication by the Missouri Department of Conservation
- Xplor Park, a theme park in Cancún
- BHP Xplor, an accelerator for early-stage mining ventures
