= Baltimore & Ohio Railroad Co. v. United States =

Baltimore & Ohio R. Co. v. United States
- Supreme Court of the United States

Argued March 12, 1923 Decided April 9, 1923
- Full case name: Baltimore & Ohio Railroad Company v. United States
- Citations: 261 U.S. 592 (more) 58 Ct.Cl. 709; 43 S. Ct. 425; 67 L. Ed. 816

Holding
- An implied in fact contract exists as, an agreement founded upon a meeting of minds, which, although not embodied in an express contract, is inferred, as a fact, from conduct of the parties showing, in the light of the surrounding circumstances, their tacit understanding.

Court membership
- Chief Justice William H. Taft Associate Justices Joseph McKenna · Oliver W. Holmes Jr. Willis Van Devanter · James C. McReynolds; Louis Brandeis · George Sutherland; Pierce Butler · Edward T. Sanford

Case opinion
- Majority: Sanford, joined by unanimous

Baltimore & Ohio Railroad Co. v. United States, 261 U.S. 592 (1923), is a US Supreme Court case on contract law. The Supreme Court held that an implied in fact contract exists as, “an agreement … founded upon a meeting of minds, which, although not embodied in an express contract, is inferred, as a fact, from conduct of the parties showing, in the light of the surrounding circumstances, their tacit understanding.”

== Facts ==
The railway company owned 8 piers in Locust Point, Baltimore, Maryland. In October, 1917, Col. Kimball requested to lease a pier from the government for supplies arriving for shipment to Europe. Two of the other piers owned by the railway company were destroyed by a fire. This caused the company and Col. Kimball to request for the guards. Two National guard companies were sent to Locust Point with the duty to protect the government property and the piers leased by it. The company supplied a wrecking train as quarters for the National guard. The company maintained civilian guards and a fire department for all of its property, whether leased or not. Later, the wrecking train was moved away by the company and the troops moved into tents. The winter was cold and the soldiers suffered hardships from the weather.

On one occasion an agent of the company suggested fitting up an unused transfer shed on the pier leased to the Government. Col. Kimball agreed but did not ask about work be done or compensation. The agent drafted plans for retrofitting the transfer shed into a barracks and showed the draft to the officer in command. The officer suggested the amount of facilities are required, but did not approve of the plans. The barracks was completed in December and the troops moved in. Two more piers were later leased to the government by the company. The barracks were occupied by the troops until May, 1919 and the piers were returned to the company in June, 1919. Compensation was not mentioned until the completion of the barracks and the draftsman told a military officer that the government should reimburse him for some of his trouble.

The railway company filed a petition to recover money under the Dent Act of 1919, c. 94, 40 Stat. 1272 for constructing temporary barracks based on an Implied-in-fact contract, in December, 1917, through Col. Kimball with Locust Point, Baltimore, Maryland. The United States Court of Claims made no finding as to the amount expended by the company constructing the barracks. None of the officials connected with the work had any authority to order the construction of a barracks. Baltimore & Ohio Railroad Co. appealed a judgment of the United States Court of Claims.

== Judgment ==
The judgment of the United States Court of Claims dismissing the appellant's action for compensation for costs of constructing temporary barracks to house the National Guard at piers leased by it to appellee was affirmed. The governmental officials involved in the construction at the piers had no authority to order the work so there was no express agreement. Further, the court reasoned there was no substantial basis for an implied in fact contract, because construction was voluntarily undertaken by appellant, with no mention of compensation.

== See also ==
- List of United States Supreme Court cases, volume 261
