= Dent Act of 1919 =

The Dent Act of 1919, was a legislative Act of the United States Congress which authorised the award of compensation for expenditure connected with the prosecution of the First World War, when such expenditure had been made by the claimant "upon the faith of an agreement, express or implied", entered into with an officer or agent acting under the authority of the Secretary of War or of the President". Its full name was "An Act to provide relief in cases of contracts connected with the prosecution of the war, and for other purposes". It was promoted by Alabama congressman Stanley Hubert Dent, and enacted on 2 March 1919.

Baltimore & Ohio Railroad's unsuccessful claim for compensation and petition to the US Supreme Court in 1923 were based on this legislation. See Baltimore & Ohio Railroad Co. v. United States, 1923.
