= Butler Machine Tool Co Ltd v Ex-Cell-O Corp (England) Ltd =

1977 Court of Appeal case involving contract formation and standard forms

Butler Machine Tool Co Ltd v Ex-Cell-O Corp Ltd
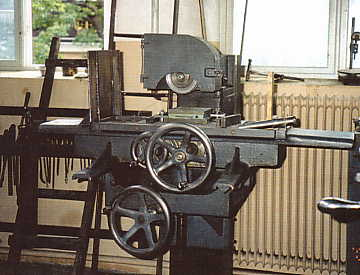
- Court: Court of Appeal
- Citations: [1977] EWCA Civ 9, [1979] 1 WLR 401

Court membership
- Judges sitting: Lord Denning MR, Lawton LJ and Bridge LJ

Keywords
- Mirror image rule, counter offer, standard form contracts

Butler Machine Tool Co Ltd v Ex-Cell-O Corp (England) Ltd [1977] EWCA Civ 9 is a leading English contract law case. It concerns the problem found among some large businesses, with each side attempting to get their preferred standard form agreements to be the basis for a contract.

== Facts ==
Butler Machine Tool Co Ltd made and sold machine tools. They sent a letter to Ex-Cell-O on May 23, 1969, offering Ex-Cell-O some new machinery for £75,535. With it were Butler's standard contract terms. These included a price variation clause so that if their manufacturing costs went up, the price rise would be passed on to Ex-Cell-O. Ex-Cell-O replied on May 27 and said they would order the machinery, but on Ex-Cell-O's own standard terms. Ex-Cell-O's standard terms did not have a price variation clause. Butler replied on June 5. It replied on the tear-off slip from Ex-Cell-O's terms. At the bottom of this slip it read, "We accept your order on the terms and conditions stated therein." But Butler added a letter reasserting that the deal was being made under Butler's own terms, from the May 23 letter. A while later, nothing further had been said, and Butler delivered the machinery. They asked for £75,535, plus £2,892 according to their price variation clause. Ex-Cell-O refused to pay the extra. Butler sued Ex-Cell-O.

== Judgment ==
The Court of Appeal held that the contract was on Ex-Cell-O's terms, and therefore the increase in price was ineffective. The majority followed a traditional offer and acceptance analysis. But Lord Denning MR's judgment took the approach that one should look for material agreement and the court should have the power to ignore irreconcilable terms. His judgment led as follows.

This case is a "battle of forms." The plaintiffs, the Butler Machine Tool Co. Ltd., suppliers of a machine, on May 23, 1969, quoted a price for a machine tool of £75,535. Delivery was to be given in 10 months. On the back of the quotation, there were terms and conditions. One of them was a price variation clause. It provided for an increase in the price if there was an increase in the costs and so forth. The machine tool was not delivered until November 1970. By that time costs had increased so much that the sellers claimed an additional sum of £2,892 as due to them under the price variation clause.

The defendant buyers, Ex-Cell-O Corporation (England) Ltd., rejected the excess charge. They relied on their own terms and conditions. They said:

"We did not accept the sellers' quotation as it was. We gave an order for the self-same machine at the self-same price, but on the back of our order we had our own terms and conditions. Our terms and conditions did not contain any price variation clause."

The judge held that the price variation clause in the sellers' form continued through the whole dealing and so the sellers were entitled to rely upon it. He was clearly influenced by a passage in Anson's Law of Contract, 24th ed. (1975), pp. 37 and 38, of which the editor is Professor Guest: and also by Treitel, The Law of Contract, 4th ed. (1975), p. 15. The judge said that the sellers did all that was necessary and reasonable to bring the price variation clause to the notice of the buyers. He thought that the buyers would not "browse over the conditions" of the sellers: and then, by printed words in their (the buyers') document, trap the sellers into a fixed price contract.

I am afraid that I cannot agree with the suggestion that the buyers "trapped" the sellers in any way. Neither party called any oral evidence before the judge. The case was decided on the documents alone. I propose therefore to go through them.

On May 23, 1969, the sellers offered to deliver one "Butler" double column plane-miller for the total price of £75,535. Delivery 10 months (subject to confirmation at time of ordering) other terms and conditions are on the reverse of this quotation. On the back there were 16 conditions in small print starting with this general condition:

"All orders are accepted only upon and subject to the terms set out in our quotation and the following conditions. These terms and conditions shall prevail over any terms and conditions in the buyer's order."

Clause 3 was the price variation clause. It said:

"Prices are based on present day costs of manufacture and design and having regard to the delivery quoted and uncertainty as to the cost of labour, materials etc. during the period of manufacture, we regret that we have no alternative but to make it a condition of acceptance of order that goods will be charged at prices ruling upon date of delivery."

The buyers replied on May 27, 1969, giving an order in these words: "Please supply on terms and conditions as below and overleaf." Below there was a list of the goods ordered, but there were differences from the quotation of the sellers in these respects: (i) there was an additional item for the cost of installation, £3,100 and (ii) there was a different delivery date: instead of 10 months, it was 10–11 months.

Overleaf there were different terms as to the cost of carriage: in that it was to be paid to the delivery address of the buyers: whereas the sellers' terms were ex warehouse. There were different terms as to the right to cancel for late delivery. The buyers in their conditions reserved the right to cancel if delivery was not made by the agreed date: whereas the sellers in their conditions said that cancellation of order due to late delivery would not be accepted.

On the foot of the buyers' order there was a tear-off slip headed:

"Acknowledgment: Please sign and return to Ex-Cell-O. We accept your order on the terms and conditions stated thereon — and undertake to deliver by — Date — signed."

In that slip the delivery date and signature were left blank ready to be filled in by the sellers.

On June 5, 1969, the sellers wrote this letter to the buyers:

"We have pleasure in acknowledging receipt of your official order dated May 27 covering the supply of one Butler Double Column Plane-Miller. This being delivered in accordance with our revised quotation of May 23 for delivery in 10/11 months, i.e., March/April 1970. We return herewith duly completed your acknowledgment of order form."

They enclosed the acknowledgment form duly filled in with the delivery date March/April 1970 and signed by the Butler Machine Tool Co.

No doubt a contract was then concluded. But on what terms? The sellers rely on their general conditions and on their last letter which said "in accordance with our revised quotation of May 23" (which had on the back the price variation clause). The buyers rely on the acknowledgment signed by the sellers which accepted the buyer's order "on the terms and conditions stated thereon" (which did not include a price variation clause).

If those documents are analysed in our traditional method, the result would seem to me to be this: the quotation of May 23, 1969, was an offer by the sellers to the buyers containing the terms and conditions on the back. The order of May 27, 1969, purported to be an acceptance of that offer in that it was for the same machine at the same price, but it contained such additions as to cost of installation, date of delivery and so forth that it was in law a rejection of the offer and constituted a counter-offer. That is clear from Hyde v. Wrench (1840) 3 Beav. 334 . As Megaw J. said in Trollope & Colls Ltd. v. Atomic Power Constructions Ltd. [1963] 1 W.L.R. 333, 337: "… the counter-offer kills the original offer." The letter of the sellers of June 5, 1969, was an acceptance of that counter-offer, as is shown by the acknowledgment which the sellers signed and returned to the buyers. The reference to the quotation of May 23 referred only to the price and identity of the machine.

To go on with the facts of the case. The important thing is that the sellers did not keep the contractual date of delivery which was March/April 1970. The machine was ready about September 1970 but by that time the buyers' production schedule had to be re-arranged as they could not accept delivery until November 1970. Meanwhile the sellers had invoked the price increase clause. They sought to charge the buyers an increase due to the rise in costs between May 27, 1969 (when the order was given), and April 1, 1970 (when the machine ought to have been delivered). It came to £2,892. The buyers rejected the claim. The judge held that the sellers were entitled to the sum of £2,892 under the price variation clause. He did not apply the traditional method of analysis by way of offer and counter-offer. He said that in the quotation of May 23, 1969, "one finds the price variation clause appearing under a most emphatic heading stating that it is a term or condition that is to prevail." So he held that it did prevail.

I have much sympathy with the judge's approach to this case. In many of these cases our traditional analysis of offer, counter-offer, rejection, acceptance and so forth is out of date. This was observed by Lord Wilberforce in New Zealand Shipping Co. Ltd. v. A. M. Satterthwaite & Co. Ltd. [1975] A.C. 154, 167. The better way is to look at all the documents passing between the parties — and glean from them, or from the conduct of the parties, whether they have reached agreement on all material points — even though there may be differences between the forms and conditions printed on the back of them. As Lord Cairns said in Brogden v. Metropolitan Railway Co. (1877) 2 App.Cas. 666, 672:

"… there may be a consensus between the parties far short of a complete mode of expressing it, and that consensus may be discovered from letters or from other documents of an imperfect and incomplete description; …"

Applying this guide, it will be found that in most cases when there is a "battle of forms," there is a contract as soon as the last of the forms is sent and received without objection being taken to it. That is well observed in Benjamin's Sale of Goods, 9th ed. (1974), p. 84. The difficulty is to decide which form, or which part of which form, is a term or condition of the contract. In some cases the battle is won by the man who fires the last shot. He is the man who puts forward the latest terms and conditions: and, if they are not objected to by the other party, he may be taken to have agreed to them. Such was British Road Services Ltd. v. Arthur V. Crutchley & Co. Ltd. [1968] 1 Lloyd's Rep. 271, 281–282, per Lord Pearson; and the illustration given by Professor Guest in Anson's Law of Contract, 24th ed., pp. 37, 38 when he says that "the terms of the contract consist of the terms of the offer subject to the modifications contained in the acceptance." In some cases the battle is won by the man who gets the blow in first. If he offers to sell at a named price on the terms and conditions stated on the back: and the buyer orders the goods purporting to accept the offer — on an order form with his own different terms and conditions on the back — then if the difference is so material that it would affect the price, the buyer ought not to be allowed to take advantage of the difference unless he draws it specifically to the attention of the seller. There are yet other cases where the battle depends on the shots fired on both sides. There is a concluded contract but the forms vary. The terms and conditions of both parties are to be construed together. If they can be reconciled so as to give a harmonious result, all well and good. If differences are irreconcilable — so that they are mutually contradictory — then the conflicting terms may have to be scrapped and replaced by a reasonable implication.

In the present case the judge thought that the sellers in their original quotation got their blow in first: especially by the provision that "these terms and conditions shall prevail over any terms and conditions in the buyer's order." It was so emphatic that the price variation clause continued through all the subsequent dealings and that the buyers must be taken to have agreed to it. I can understand that point of view. But I think that the documents have to be considered as a whole. And, as a matter of construction, I think the acknowledgment of June 5, 1969, is the decisive document. It makes it clear that the contract was on the buyers' terms and not on the sellers' terms: and the buyers' terms did not include a price variation clause.

I would therefore allow the appeal and enter judgment for the defendants.

Lawton LJ concurred.

The modern commercial practice of making quotations and placing orders with conditions attached, usually in small print, is indeed likely, as in this case to produce a battle of forms. The problem is how should that battle be conducted? The view taken by Thesiger J. was that the battle should extend over a wide area and the court should do its best to look into the minds of the parties and make certain assumptions. In my judgment, the battle has to be conducted in accordance with set rules. It is a battle more on classical 18th century lines when convention decided who had the right to open fire first rather than in accordance with the modern concept of attrition.

The rules relating to a battle of this kind have been known for the past 130-odd years. They were set out by Lord Langdale M.R. in Hyde v. Wrench, 3 Beav. 334, 337, to which Lord Denning M.R. has already referred; and, if anyone should have thought they were obsolescent, Megaw J. in Trollope & Colls Ltd. v. Atomic Power Constructions Ltd. [1963] 1 W.L.R. 333, 337 called attention to the fact that those rules are still in force.

When those rules are applied to this case, in my judgment, the answer is obvious. The sellers started by making an offer. That was in their quotation. The small print was headed by the following words:

"General. All orders are accepted only upon and subject to the terms set out in our quotation and the following conditions. These terms and conditions shall prevail over any terms and conditions in the buyer's order."

That offer was not accepted. The buyers were only prepared to have one of these very expensive machines on their own terms. Their terms had very material differences in them from the terms put forward by the sellers. They could not be reconciled in any way. In the language of article 7 of the Uniform Law on the Formation of Contracts for the International Sale of Goods (see Uniform Laws on International Sales Act 1967, Schedule 2) they did "materially alter the terms" set out in the offer made by the plaintiffs.

As I understand Hyde v. Wrench, 3 Beav. 334, and the cases which have followed, the consequence of placing the order in that way, if I may adopt Megaw J.'s words [1963] 1 W.L.R. 333, 337, was "to kill the original offer." It follows that the court has to look at what happened after the buyers made their counter-offer. By letter dated June 4, 1969, the plaintiffs acknowledged receipt of the counter-offer, and they went on in this way:

"Details of this order have been passed to our Halifax works for attention and a formal acknowledgment of order will follow in due course."

That is clearly a reference to the printed tear-off slip which was at the bottom of the buyers' counter-offer. By letter dated June 5, 1969, the sales office manager at the plaintiffs' Halifax factory completed that tear-off slip and sent it back to the buyers.

It is true, as Mr. Scott has reminded us, that the return of that printed slip was accompanied by a letter which had this sentence in it: "This is being entered in accordance with our revised quotation of May 23 for delivery in 10/11 months." I agree with Lord Denning M.R. that, in business sense, that refers to the quotation as to the price and the identity of the machine, and it does not bring into the contract the small print conditions on the back of the quotation. Those small print conditions had disappeared from the story. That was when the contract was made. At that date it was a fixed price contract without a price escalation clause.

As I pointed out in the course of argument to Mr. Scott, if the letter of June 5 which accompanied the form acknowledging the terms which the buyers had specified had amounted to a counter-offer, then in my judgment the parties never were ad idem. It cannot be said that the buyers accepted the counter-offer by reason of the fact that ultimately they took physical delivery of the machine. By the time they took physical delivery of the machine, they had made it clear by correspondence that they were not accepting that there was any price escalation clause in any contract which they had made with the plaintiffs.

I agree with Lord Denning MR that this appeal should be allowed.

Bridge LJ agreed with the result.

Schedule 2 to the Uniform Laws on International Sales Act 1967 is headed "The Uniform Law on the Formation of Contracts for the International Sale of Goods." To the limited extent that that Schedule is already in force in the law of this country, it would not in any event be applicable to the contract which is the subject of this appeal because that was not a contract of international sale of goods as defined in that statute.

We have heard, nevertheless, an interesting discussion on the question of the extent to which the terms of article 7 of that Schedule are mirrored in the common law of England today. No difficulty arises about paragraph 1 of the article, which provides: "An acceptance containing additions, limitations or other modifications shall be a rejection of the offer and shall constitute a counter-offer." But paragraph 2 of the article is in these terms:

"However, a reply to an offer which purports to be an acceptance but which contains additional or different terms which do not materially alter the terms of the offer shall constitute an acceptance unless the offeror promptly objects to the discrepancy; if he does not so object, the terms of the contract shall be the terms of the offer with the modifications contained in the acceptance."

For my part, I consider it both unnecessary and undesirable to express any opinion on the question whether there is any difference between the principle expressed in that paragraph 2 and the principle which would prevail in the common law of England today without reference to that paragraph, but it was presumably a principle analogous to that expressed in paragraph 2 of article 7 which the editor of Anson's Law of Contract, 24th ed., Professor Guest, had in mind in the passage from that work which was quoted in the judgment of Lord Denning MR On any view, that passage goes a good deal further than the principle expressed in article 7 of the Act of 1967, and I entirely agree with Lord Denning M.R. that it goes too far.

But when one turns from those interesting and abstruse areas of the law to the plain facts of this case, this case is nothing like the kind of case with which either the makers of the convention which embodied article 7 of Schedule 2 or the editor of Anson, 24th ed., had in mind in the passages referred to, because this is a case which on its facts is plainly governed by what I may call the classical doctrine that a counter-offer amounts to a rejection of an offer and puts an end to the effect of the offer.

The first offer between the parties here was the plaintiff sellers' quotation dated May 23, 1969. The conditions of sale in the small print on the back of that document, as well as embodying the price variation clause, to which reference has been made in the judgments already delivered, embodied a number of other important conditions. There was a condition providing that orders should in no circumstances be cancelled without the written consent of the sellers and should only be cancelled on terms which indemnified the sellers against loss. There was a condition that the sellers should not be liable for any loss or damage from delay however caused. There was a condition purporting to limit the sellers' liability for damage due to defective workmanship or materials in the goods sold. And there was a condition providing that the buyers should be responsible for the cost of delivery.

When one turns from that document to the buyers' order of May 27, 1969, it is perfectly clear not only that that order was a counter-offer but that it did not purport in any way to be an acceptance of the terms of the sellers' offer dated May 23. In addition, when one compares the terms and conditions of the buyers' offer, it is clear that they are in fact contrary in a number of vitally important respects to the conditions of sale in the sellers' offer. Amongst the buyers' proposed conditions are conditions that the price of the goods shall include the cost of delivery to the buyers' premises; that the buyers shall be entitled to cancel for any delay in delivery; and a condition giving the buyers a right to reject if on inspection the goods are found to be faulty in any respect.

The position then was, when the sellers received the buyers' offer of May 27, that that was an offer open to them to accept or reject. They replied in two letters dated June 4 and 5 respectively. The letter of June 4 was an informal acknowledgment of the order, and the letter of June 5 enclosed the formal acknowledgment, as Lord Denning M.R. and Lawton L.J. have said, embodied in the printed tear-off slip taken from the order itself and including the perfectly clear and unambiguous sentence "We accept your order on the terms and conditions stated thereon." On the face of it, at that moment of time, there was a complete contract in existence, and the parties were ad idem as to the terms of the contract embodied in the buyers' order.

Mr. Scott has struggled manfully to say that the contract concluded on those terms and conditions was in some way overruled or varied by the references in the two letters dated June 4 and 5 to the quotation of May 23, 1969. The first refers to the machinery being as quoted on May 23. The second letter says that the order has been entered in accordance with the quotation of May 23. I agree with Lord Denning MR and Lawton LJ that that language has no other effect than to identify the machinery and to refer to the prices quoted on May 23. But on any view, at its highest, the language is equivocal and wholly ineffective to override the plain and unequivocal terms of the printed acknowledgment of order which was enclosed with the letter of June 5. Even if that were not so and if Mr. Scott could show that the sellers' acknowledgment of the order was itself a further counter-offer, I suspect that he would be in considerable difficulties in showing that any later circumstance amounted to an acceptance of that counter-offer in the terms of the original quotation of May 23 by the buyers. But I do not consider that question further because I am content to rest upon the view that there is nothing in the letter of June 5 which overrides the plain effect of the acceptance of the order on the terms and conditions stated thereon.

I too would allow the appeal and enter the judgment for the defendants.

== Significance ==
As a result of the majority ruling in the Butler Machine Tool case, English law continues to approach the issue of the battle of forms from the viewpoint of analysing the communication between the parties to see if it can be discerned into an offer and acceptance.

An example of a different theoretical approach to resolving the "battle of forms" issue can be found in Article 19 of the Vienna Convention for the International Sale of Goods, which provides:

1. A reply to an offer which purports to be an acceptance but contains additions, limitations or other modifications is a rejection of the offer and constitutes a counter-offer.
2. However, a reply to an offer which purports to be an acceptance but contains additional or different terms which do not materially alter the terms of the offer constitutes an acceptance, unless the offeror, without undue delay, objects orally to the discrepancy or dispatches a notice to that effect. If he does not so object, the terms of the contract are the terms of the offer with the modifications contained in the acceptance.
3. Additional or different terms relating, among other things, to the price, payment, quality and quantity of the goods, place and time of delivery, extent of one party's liability to the other or the settlement of disputes are considered to alter the terms of the offer materially.

Please note: The United Nations Convention on Contracts for the International Sales of Goods has been ratified by 78 states. The United Kingdom is not one of those 78 states.

== See also ==
- Agreement in English law
