= Harvela Investments Ltd v Royal Trust of Canada (CI) Ltd =

Harvela Investments Ltd. v Royal Trust of Canada (CI) Ltd. [1985] UKHL 16 is a legal case decided by the House of Lords in 1985 defining the law of England and Wales regarding referential bids in competitive tenders.

== Facts ==
The Royal Trust Company owned shares in a company, and invited bids for them. Harvela bid $2,175,000 and Sir Leonard Outerbridge bid:

"$2,100,000 or $101,000 in excess of any other offer expressed as a fixed monetary amount, whichever is higher."

The Royal Trust accepted Sir Leonard's bid as being $2,276,000. Harvela sued for breach of contract, saying a referential bid was invalid. The Court of Appeal held in favour of the Royal Trust, that expressing a fixed amount made the referential bid valid.

== Judgement ==
The House of Lords unanimously reversed the Court of Appeal's decision. Lord Templeman, in his judgement, pointed especially to South Hetton Coal Co. v Haswell, Shotton and Easington Coal and Coke Co. [1898] 1 Ch 465, where Sir Nathaniel Lindley MR had dealt with referential bids previously (233-4).

In the South Hetton case there was no fixed bid but only a referential bid by one bidder of £200 more than the amount offered by the other bidder who offered £31,000. The referential bid was held to be invalid. The South Hetton case was decided by a powerful court, has stood unchallenged for over 80 years and was binding on the Court of Appeal in the present case. It was argued that Sir Leonard's unsuccessful valid bid of $2,100,000 in some unexplained fashion transformed his invalid referential bid into a valid bid, but the argument owes everything to wishful thinking and nothing to logic. It was also argued that the South Hetton case was distinguishable because the vendors in that case undertook to accept "the highest net money tender", whereas in the present case the vendors undertook to accept "the highest offer". The argument seeks to elevate a trivial difference into a legal distinction. The decision in the South Hetton case was followed by a majority of the members of the New York Court of Appeals in S.S.I. Investors Ltd. v. Korea Tungsten Mining Co. Ltd. (1982) 449 N.Y.S. 2d 173. The majority judgment, at pp. 174-175, succinctly and cogently summarised the reasons for rejecting referential bids as follows:

"The very essence of sealed competitive bidding is the submission of independent, self-contained bids, to the fair compliance with which not only the owner but the other bidders are entitled... to give effect to this or any similar bidding practice in which the dollar amount of one bid was tied to the bid or bids of another or others in the same bidding would be to recognise means whereby effective sealed competitive bidding could be wholly frustrated. In the context of such bidding, therefore, a submission by one bidder of a bid dependent for its definition on the bids of others is invalid and unacceptable as inconsistent with and potentially destructive of the very bidding in which it is submitted."

Lord Diplock died three months after giving his judgement (11 July 1985), aged 78. He put his opinion in the following way:

The answer to the construction question itself, however, appears to me to present no difficulties in so far as it leads to the conclusion that the condition subsequent to which the vendors’ obligations under the unilateral contracts were subject was incapable of being fulfilled by either promisee except by a self-contained offer of a purchase price for the shares expressed as a fixed sum of money which did not necessitate, for its quantification, reference to offers made by any other bidders. I appreciate that this cannot be quite so obvious as I myself have thought throughout, seeing that the Court of Appeal felt compelled to come to a different conclusion.

Lord Bridge added that the referential bid can only be ascertained in amount after the deadline has fallen for all bids to come in.

== See also ==
- Invitation to treat
- Agreement in English law
