= Stevenson, Jaques & Co v McLean =

1880 English contract law case on the postal rule's application to telegraphs

Stevenson, Jaques, & Co. v McLean
- Court: High Court Queen's Bench Division
- Full case name: Stevenson, Jaques & Co v McLean

Keywords
- Acceptance, counter-offer, request for information

Stevenson, Jaques, & Co v McLean [1880] 5 QBD 346 is an English contract law case concerning the rules on communication of acceptance by telegraph. Its approach contrasts to the postal rule.

== Facts ==
Plaintiff Stevenson were iron merchants who purchased iron to sell on to third parties. Defendant McLean was the holder of warrants (titles) for quantities of iron. By telegram (dated Saturday 27 September) McLean offered to sell iron to Stevenson for “40s., nett cash, open till Monday” (the original offer).

On Monday morning Stevenson sent a telegram to McLean asking whether McLean would accept forty for delivery over two months, or if not, longest limit you would allow (Stevenson's telegraphic enquiry). McLean did not respond to the telegram and later that day sold all warrants to another party. McLean sent a telegram to Stevenson at 1.25pm on the Monday advising all warrants had been sold (McLean's telegram of warrants sold). Prior to receiving that communication, Stevenson sent a telegram to McLean at 1.34pm advising acceptance of offer (Stevenson's acceptance of offer). Stevenson subsequently sued McLean for non-delivery of iron warrants alleging breach of contract.

The main issues were:

- Whether P's telegraphic enquiry constituted a counter offer, the effect of which would be to extinguish D's original offer.
- Whether the decision in Cooke v Oxley (3 TR 653) has the effect of allowing the Defendant (McLean) to revoke the offer to sell prior to its acceptance by the Plaintiffs (Stevenson, Jaques & Co).
- Related to the second issue was a question as to whether the telegram from D at 1.25pm effectively revoked the original offer, notwithstanding that it was not received by P until after P had accepted the offer.

== Judgment ==
Lush J held the plaintiff's telegram at 9.42am was not a rejection of the offer but a mere inquiry about whether the terms could be modified. Although McLean was at liberty to revoke the offer before Monday finished, that was not effective until it reached the plaintiffs. Lush J charged the defendant the amount of £1900 to be paid to the plaintiffs subject to any reduction by subsequent ruling.

As to the first issue, having regard to the nature of the wording of P's telegraphic inquiry and the volatility of the iron market, the communication cannot be regarded as a counter-offer but a mere inquiry to which the defendant should have responded. The circumstances can be distinguished from Hyde v Wrench 3 Beav. 334, where there was a clear counter-offer [per Lush, J at 358].

As to the second and third issues the argument advanced by D misrepresents the proposition for which Cooke v Oxley stands. The correct principle is that a unilateral promise to hold open an offer is not binding upon the person who made it and can be revoked prior to its acceptance. However, a revocation has no effect until it is actually communicated to the person to whom the original offer was made [per Lush J at 352] relying upon the American decisions in Tayloe v Merchant's Fire Insurance Co How. Sup. Court Rep. 390 and Byrne & Co v Leon Van Tienhoven & Co 49 L.L. (C.P.) [316]. As P had not received D's telegram of warrants sold which would have the effect of revoking the original offer, the original offer stood and P's subsequent acceptance of it resulted in a contract.

There is nothing specific by way of offer or rejection, but a mere inquiry, which should have been answered and not treated as rejection of the offer.
