= Felthouse v Bindley =

Contract law case in England

Felthouse v Bindley.
- Court: Court of Common Pleas
- Decided: 8 July 1862
- Citation: (1862) 11 Cb (NS) 869; [1862] EWHC CP J35; 142 ER 1037
- Transcript: Full text of judgment

Case history
- Subsequent action: (1863) 7 LT 835

Court membership
- Judges sitting: Willes J, Byles J and Keating J

Felthouse v Bindley [1862] EWHC CP J35, is the leading English contract law case on the rule that one cannot impose an obligation on another to reject one's offer. This is sometimes misleadingly expressed as a rule that "silence cannot amount to acceptance".

Later the case has been rethought, because it appeared that on the facts, acceptance was communicated by conduct (see, Brogden v Metropolitan Railway). Furthermore, in Rust v Abbey Life Assurance Co Ltd. the Court of Appeal held that a failure by a proposed insured to reject a proffered insurance policy for seven months justified on its own an inference of acceptance.

== Facts ==
Paul Felthouse was a builder who lived in London. He wanted to buy a horse from his nephew, John Felthouse. After a letter from the nephew concerning a discussion about buying the horse, the uncle replied saying

"If I hear no more about him, I consider the horse mine at £30.15s."

The nephew did not reply. He was busy at auctions on his farm in Tamworth. He told the man running the auctions, William Bindley, not to sell the horse. But by accident, Bindley did. The uncle, Paul Felthouse, then sued Bindley in the tort of conversion - using someone else's property inconsistently with their rights. But for the uncle to show the horse was his property, he had to show there was a valid contract. Bindley argued there was not, since the nephew had never communicated his acceptance of the uncle's offer.

== Judgment ==
The court ruled that Felthouse did not have ownership of the horse as there was no acceptance of the contract. Acceptance must be communicated clearly and cannot be imposed due to silence of one of the parties. The uncle had no right to impose a sale through silence whereby the contract would only fail by repudiation. Though the nephew expressed interest in completing the sale there was no communication of that intention until after the horse was sold at auction on 25 February. The nephew's letter of 27 February which was submitted as evidence by Felthouse was judged to be the first instance of communication where the acceptance was communicated to the offeror(Felthouse).And by this time, the horse had already been sold. Accordingly Felthouse had no interest in the property.

Willes J delivered the lead judgment.

I am of opinion that the rule to enter a nonsuit should be made absolute. The horse in question had belonged to the plaintiff's nephew, John Felthouse. In December, 1860, a conversation took place between the plaintiff and his nephew relative to the purchase of the horse by the former. The uncle seems to have thought that he had on that occasion bought the horse for £30, the nephew said that he had sold it for 30 guineas, but there was clearly no complete bargain at that time. On 1 January, 1861, the nephew writes,

"I saw my father on Saturday. He told me that you considered you had bought the horse for £30. If so, you are labouring under a mistake, for 30 guineas was the price I put upon him, and you never heard me say less. When you said you would have him, I considered you were aware of the price."

To this the uncle replies on the following day,

"Your price, I admit, was 30 guineas. I offered £30.; never offered more: and you said the horse was mine. However, as there may be a mistake about him, I will split the difference. If I hear no more about him, I consider the horse mine at £30 and 15s."

It is clear that there was no complete bargain on the 2nd of January: and it is also clear that the uncle had no right to impose upon the nephew a sale of his horse for £30 and 15s. unless he chose to comply with the condition of writing to repudiate the offer. The nephew might, no doubt, have bound his uncle to the bargain by writing to him: the uncle might also have retracted his offer at any time before acceptance. It stood an open offer: and so things remained until the 25th of February, when the nephew was about to sell his farming stock by auction. The horse in question being catalogued with the rest of the stock, the auctioneer (the defendant) was told that it was already sold. It is clear, therefore, that the nephew in his own mind intended his uncle to have the horse at the price which he (the uncle) had named, £30 and 15s.: but he had not communicated such his intention to his uncle, or done anything to bind himself. Nothing, therefore, had been done to vest the property in the horse in the plaintiff down to the 25th of February, when the horse was sold by the defendant. It appears to me that, independently of the subsequent letters, there had been no bargain to pass the property in the horse to the plaintiff, and therefore that he had no right to complain of the sale.

Then, what is the effect of the subsequent correspondence? The letter of the auctioneer amounts to nothing. The more important letter is that of the nephew, of the 27th of February, which is relied on as shewing that he intended to accept and did accept the terms offered by his uncle's letter of the 2nd of January. That letter, however, may be treated either as an acceptance then for the first time made by him, or as a memorandum of a bargain complete before the 25th of February, sufficient within the statute of frauds. It seems to me that the former is the more likely construction: and, if so, it is clear that the plaintiff cannot recover. But, assuming that there had been a complete parol bargain before the 25th of February, and that the letter of the 27th was a mere expression of the terms of that prior bargain, and not a bargain then for the first time concluded, it would be directly contrary to the decision of the court of Exchequer in Stockdale v. Dunlop to hold that that acceptance had relation back to the previous offer so as to bind third persons in respect of a dealing with the property by them in the interim. In that case, Messrs. H. & Co., being the owners of two ships, called the " Antelope" and the "Maria," trading to the coast of Africa, and which were then expected to arrive in Liverpool with cargoes of palm-oil, agreed verbally to sell the plaintiffs two hundred tons of oil,- one hundred tons to arrive by the "Antelope," and one hundred tons by the "Maria." The "Antelope" did afterwards arrive with one hundred -tons of oil on board, which were delivered by H. & Co. to the plaintiffs. The "Maria," having fifty tons of oil on board, was lost by perils of the sea. The plaintiffs having insured the oil on board the "Maria," together with their expected profits thereon, it was held that they had no insurable interest, as the contract they had entered into with H. & Co., being verbal only, was incapable of being enforced.

Byles J

I am of the same opinion, and have nothing to add to what has fallen from my Brother Willes.

Keating J

I am of the same opinion. Had the question arisen as between the uncle and the nephew, there would probably have been some difficulty. But, as between the uncle and the auctioneer, the only question we have to consider is whether the horse was the property of the plaintiff at the time of the sale on the 25th of February. It seems to me that nothing had been done at that time to pass the property out of the nephew and vest it in the plaintiff. A proposal had been made, but there had before that day been no acceptance binding the nephew.

Willes J.

Coats v. Chaplin is an authority to shew that John Felthouse might have had a remedy against the auctioneer. There, the traveller of Morrisons, tradesmen in London, verbally ordered goods for Morrisons of the plaintiffs, manufacturers at Paisley. No order was given as to sending the goods. The plaintiffs gave them to the defendants, carriers, directed to Morrisons, to be taken to them, and also sent an invoice by post to Morrisons, who received it. The goods having been lost by the defendants' negligence, and not delivered to Morrisons, it was held that the defendants were liable to the plaintiffs.

The result was affirmed in the Court of Exchequer Chamber, (1863) 7 LT 835.

== See also ==
- English contract law
- Brogden v Metropolitan Railway Company (1876–77) LR 2 App Cas 666
