= Dunlop v Higgins =

1848 Scottish contract law case confirming the postal rule

Dunlop v Higgins [(1848) 1 H.L.C. 381] was an early decision confirming the postal rule in the Scots law of contract formation. The decision was based on the earlier case of Adams v. Lindsell.

== Facts ==
Dunlop & Company offered by post to sell 2,000 tons of pig-Iron at some price. The offer was sent on 28 January 1845. It reached Higgins on 30 January 1845. Higgins posted the letter of acceptance the same day but the defendant received it on 1 February 1845 with some delay. The defendant refused to supply the goods, because the prices had increased.

== Judgment ==
It was held that the acceptor was not responsible for any delay in the course of the transit. Hence there was a binding contract. The posting of a letter accepting an offer constitutes a binding contract even if the letter never arrives due to the fault of the post office.

== See also ==
- Offer and acceptance
- Mailbox rule
- Adams v Lindsell
- Household Fire Insurance Co v Grant
- Henthorn v Fraser
