= Referential bid =

Type of bid in an auction

A referential bid is a bid or tender for the purchase or supply of goods or services whose value is stated by reference to the bids or tenders received from competitors (if any), e.g. "such a sum as will exceed by £200 the amount ... offered ... by any other proposing purchaser". Case law in various jurisdictions (see below) has generally ruled that referential bids frustrate the purpose of sealed competitive bidding and are therefore unfair.

== Case law ==
- South Hetton Coal Co v Haswell Shotton and Easington Coal and Coke Co., [1898] 1 Ch 465 (England and Wales)
- SSI Investors Ltd. v. Korea Tungsten Mining Co. Ltd., [1982] 449 NYS 2d173 (New York Court of Appeals)
- Harvela Investments Ltd v Royal Trust of Canada (CI) Ltd., [1986] AC 207, [1985] UKHL 16, [1986] 1 AC 207 (England and Wales)
- Smart Telecom PLC trading as Smart Telecom v Raidió Teilifís Éireann and by order Glanbia PLC, [2006] No 1865 P, 26 May 2006 (High Court of Ireland)
