= Bamford v Turnley =

- Court: Court of Exchequer
- Citations: 3 B & S 62, 122 ER 25

Court membership
- Judge sitting: George Wilshere, 1st Baron Bramwell

Bamford v Turnley (1860) 3 B & S 62; 122 ER 25, is an English tort law case concerning nuisance and what it means to be a reasonable user of land.

== Facts ==
The defendants burnt bricks in a kiln and this sent noxious fumes to the surrounding country, affecting various neighbours. It made them and their servants ill. They sued to prevent the nuisance.

At first instance it was held that the brick smoke was reasonable because the defendant had only been using the kiln in order to build a home.

== Judgment ==
Bramwell B held that the defendants had to pay compensation. Responding to the argument that if land is being reasonably used in itself, then there is a public interest that it should be carried on Bramwell B went on...

But further, with great respect, I think this consideration misapplied in this and in many other cases. The public consists of all the individuals in it, and a thing is only for the public benefit when it is productive of good to those individuals on the balance of loss and gain to all. So that if all the loss and all the gain were borne and received by one individual he, on the whole, would be a gainer. But whenever this is the case — whenever a thing is for the public benefit, properly understood — the loss to the individuals of the public who lose will bear compensation out of the gains of those who gain. It is for the public benefit that there should be railways; but it would not be unless the gain of having the railway was sufficient to compensate the loss occasioned by the use of the land required for its site; and accordingly, no one thinks it would be right to take an individual’s land without compensation, to make a railway. It is for the public benefit that trains should run, but not unless they pay their expenses. If one of these expenses is the burning down of a wood of such value that the railway owners would not run the train and burn down the wood if it were their own, neither is it for the public benefit that they should if the wood is not their own. If, though the wood were their own, they still would find it compensated them to run trains at the cost of burning the wood, then they obviously ought to compensate the owner of such wood, not being themselves, if they burn it down in making their gains.

So in like way in this case a money value indeed cannot easily be put on the plaintiff’s loss, but it is equal to some number of pounds or pence, £10, £50 or what not: unless the defendant’s profits are enough to compensate this, I deny that it is for the public benefit he should do what he has done; if they are, he ought to compensate...

There must be, then, some principle on which such cases must be excepted. It seems to me that that principle may be deduced from the character of these cases, and is this, viz: that those acts necessary for the common and ordinary use and occupation of land and houses may be done, if conveniently done, without subjecting those who do them to an action... There is an obvious necessity for such a principle as I have mentioned. It is as much for the advantage of one owner as of another; for the very nuisance the one complains of, as the result of the ordinary use of his neighbour's land, he himself will create in the ordinary use of his own, and the reciprocal nuisances are of a comparatively trifling character. The convenience of such a rule may be indicated by calling it a rule of give and take, live and let live. (at 83-84)

== Treatment ==
The case became a staple of hornbooks, treatises, and law school textbooks, starting in the late 19th century.

== See also ==
- Kaldor-Hicks efficiency
