= Transaction document =

Transaction documents refers to legally relevant documents that are either printed, inserted and mailed, or electronically presented. They consist of a mixture of fixed and variable data.

These documents are usually created by organizations through their financial computing system and then delivered to other parties (such as clients) through the post office or through an electronic billing system. The printed transaction documents, once delivered to the post office, conform to the mail box rule.

Common examples of transaction documents are:

- bills
- bank statements (and credit card, financial services, etc.)
- insurance policies
- notices
- other legally relevant correspondence, etc.

Xplor international is a technical association that focuses on the best practices and technologies associated with these documents.
