= Hyde v Wrench =

Contract Law Landmark case

- Court: Rolls Court
- Full case name: Hyde v Wrench
- Decided: 8 December 1840
- Citations: [1840] EWHC Ch J90, [1840] 3 Bea 334, [1840] 49 ER 132

Court membership
- Judge sitting: Lord Langdale

Keywords
- offer, counter-offer

Hyde v Wrench [1840] EWHC Ch J90 is a leading English contract law case on the issue of counter-offers and their relation to initial offers. It contains Lord Langdale's ruling that any counter-offer cancels the original offer.

== Facts ==
Wrench offered to sell his farm in Luddenham, Kent, to Hyde for £1,200, an offer which Hyde declined. On 6 June 1840 Wrench wrote to Hyde's agent offering to sell the farm for £1,000, stating that it was the final offer and that he would not alter from it. Hyde offered £950 in his letter by 8 June, and after examining the offer Wrench refused to accept, and informed Hyde of this on 27 June. On the 29th Hyde agreed to buy the farm for £1,000 without any additional agreement from Wrench, and after Wrench refused to sell the farm to him he sued for breach of contract.

== Judgment ==
Lord Langdale's judgment read:

Under the circumstances stated in this bill, I think there exists no valid binding contract between the parties for the purchase of this property. The defendant offered to sell it for £1,000, and if that had been at once unconditionally accepted there would undoubtedly have been a perfect binding contract; instead of that, the plaintiff made an offer of his own, to purchase the property for £950, and he thereby rejected the offer previously made by the defendant. I think that it was not afterwards competent for him to revive the proposal of the defendant, by tendering an acceptance of it; and that, therefore, there exists no obligation of any sort between the parties.

== See also ==
- Stevenson, Jacques & Co v McLean [1880] 5 QBD 346
- Butler Machine Tool Co Ltd v Ex-Cell-O Corp (England) Ltd [1977] EWCA Civ 9
