= Xplor International =

Xplor International also known as The Electronic Document Systems Association is an international trade association specifically focused on the issues of transaction documents. Transaction documents are legally relevant documents that are either printed and mailed or are electronically delivered e.g. bills, bank statements, insurance policies etc. The goal of the organization is to promotes "best practices for the design, production and delivery of electronic documents."

The acronym XPLOR was derived from Xerox Printer Liaison ORganization, the original association name. Xplor expanded its mission in 1983 to include other vendors' technology and adopted the acronym as the organization's name.

== History ==
Xplor International was founded in 1980 as a trade association specifically for transaction document applications, due to the difference in emphasis on variable data. Originally a user group for the Xerox 9700 laser printer, they reshaped their mission in the early 1980s to address the entire transaction document industry. Hardware companies like IBM, Siemens (later Océ), Hewlett Packard, Pitney Bowes, Bell & Howell, Ricoh, and Xerox have been actively involved as have software companies like Image Sciences (later Docucorp International), Document Sciences, Cincom Systems, GMC Software Technology, Xenos, Crawford Technologies, supported Xplor in order to promote a venue for the issues that are unique to the creation of transaction documents.

In the 1990s, Xplor began to shift from solely document “printing” to document “printing and presentation”, as transaction documents came to be presented on the Web.

As of 2018 Xplor hosts an annual conference with presentations on topics such as "Communication Design, Technologies, and Customer Experience".

== Membership ==
Xplor’s membership of users and vendors is worldwide, with approximately 45% of the membership in the early 2000s being outside the US.

=== Electronic Document Professional ===
Xplor manages the Electronic Document Professional (EDP) certification program for people experienced in electronic document systems and/or application development.

== Associations in related fields ==
- Association of Records Managers and Administrators, the association for records management professionals
