= Manchester Diocesan Council for Education v Commercial and General Investments Ltd =

Manchester Diocesan Council for Education v Commercial and General Investments Ltd [1970] 1 WLR 241, [1969] 3 All ER 1593 is a case in English contract law relating to agreement. The court held that the method of acceptance prescribed for a tender, if not expressed "in terms insisting that only acceptance in that mode shall be binding", was not mandatory, and if an offeror wishes it to be mandatory this needs to be made explicit.

This case shows a type of acceptance whereby the method of communication of acceptance is prescribed.
