= The Brimnes =

- Court: Court of Appeal
- Citations: [1974] EWCA Civ 15, [1975] QB 929

Court membership
- Judges sitting: Edmund Davies LJ, Megaw LJ and Cairns LJ

Keywords
- Communication, acceptance, contract formation

Tenax Steamship Co v Owners of the Motor Vessel Brimnes [1974] EWCA Civ 15 is an English contract law case on agreement. It decided that communication of withdrawal of an offer by telex is effective when it could be read, rather than when it is in fact read.

== Judgment ==
The Court of Appeal held that it took place when it was received in the charterer's office, not when it was read. Accepting the submissions of Robert Goff QC, Edmund-Davies LJ said this in the course of his judgment.

The question remains, however, as to whether that was sufficient to constitute communication of the withdrawal notice to the charterers, a point which Mr. Anthony Evans accepts it is for him to establish. He submits that, by leaving the Telex machine working, the charterers in effect represented that any message so transmitted to them during ordinary business hours would (as Mrs. Sayce herself conceded) be dealt with promptly. That Scarf v Jardine, 7 App Cas 345 does not have universal application is shown by Car and Universal Finance Co Ltd v Caldwell [1965] 1 QB 525, where one party to a contract had done all he could to evince to the other party his intention to rescind it. Then what more could the owners' agents in the present case reasonably have been expected to do than they did? In Entores Ltd v Miles Far East Corporation [1955] 2 QB 327, where this court was dealing with a contract said to have been concluded by Telex communication between the parties, Denning LJ held that it was not until the Telex message of acceptance was received by the offeror that the contract was complete. He said, at p. 333:

"... the ink on the teleprinter fails at the receiving end, but the [offeree's] clerk does not ask for the message to be repeated: so that the man who sends an acceptance reasonably believes that his message has been received. The offeror in such circumstances is clearly bound, because he will be estopped from saying that he did not receive the message of acceptance. It is his own fault that he did not get it. But if there should be a case where the offeror without any fault on his part does not receive the message of acceptance - yet the sender of it reasonably believes it has got home when it has not - then I think there is no contract."

Brandon J held here that the notice of withdrawal was sent during ordinary business hours, and that he was driven to the conclusion either that the charterers' staff had left the office on April 2 "well before the end of ordinary business hours" or that, if they were indeed there, they "neglected to pay attention to the Telex machine in the way which they claimed it was their ordinary practice to do" [1973] 1 WLR 386, 406. He therefore concluded that the withdrawal Telex must be regarded as having been "received", as required by Empresa Cubana de Fletes v Lagonisi Shipping Co Ltd [1971] 1 QB 488, at 17.45 hours BST on April 2 and that the withdrawal was effected at that time. I propose to say no more than that I respectfully agree with that conclusion, particularly as the case for the charterers throughout was that Mrs. Sayce, the member of their staff specially charged with attending to Telex messages, did not leave the office until after 18.30 hours and they advanced no reason why a Telex message received on their machine at 17.45 hours should not have been noted by her before she left the office, as she insisted, not less than 45 minutes later.

== See also ==
- English contract law
