= Henthorn v Fraser =

1892 English-Welsh contract law case on the postal rule

- Court: Court of Appeal of England and Wales
- Decided: 1892
- Citation: 2 Ch 27

Court membership
- Judge sitting: Lord Herschell

Keywords
- Contract law

Henthorn v Fraser [1892] 2 Ch 27 is a decision of the Court of Appeal of England and Wales dealing with the postal rule in English law of contract formation.

== Facts ==
The defendant and the claimant were situated at Liverpool and Birkenhead respectively. The defendant called at the office of the claimant in order to negotiate the purchase of some houses. The defendant handed the claimant a note giving him the option to purchase some houses within 14 days. On the next day, the defendant withdrew the offer by post, but his withdrawal did not reach the claimant until 5 P.M. Meanwhile, the claimant responded by post with an unconditional acceptance of the offer, which was delivered to the defendant after its office had closed. The letter was opened by the defendant the next morning.

== Judgement ==
The Court of Appeal ordered that the claimant was entitled to specific performance. Lord Herschell argued: "Where the circumstances are such that it must have been within the contemplation of the parties that, according to ordinary usage of mankind, the post might be used as a means of communicating the acceptance of an offer, the acceptance is complete as soon as it is posted."

== Significance ==
The case is based on a line of decision starting with Adams v Lindsell (1818), according to which the acceptance was valid at the time of posting. The importance of this decision's ratio is that a postal acceptance will only be valid at the time of posting if it is reasonable for the offeror to expect an acceptance by post. The fact that both parties were living in different towns justifies the inference that both parties had contemplated that a letter sent by post was a mode by which acceptance might be communicated (per Kay L.J. at page 36)

== See also ==
- Offer and acceptance
- Mailbox rule
- Adams v. Lindsell
- Dunlop v. Higgins
- Household Fire Insurance Co v. Grant
