= Powell v Lee =

- Court: King's Bench Division
- Decided: 1908
- Citation: 99 LT 284

Powell v Lee (1908) 99 LT 284 was an English contract law case. The ruling established that acceptance of an offer must be communicated to offeror by offeree himself or authorized agent.

== Facts ==
Mr. Powell applied for a job as headmaster and the school managers decided to appoint him. One of them, acting without authority, told Powell he had been accepted. Later the managers decided to appoint someone else. Then Powell brought an action alleging that by breach of a contract to employ him he had suffered damages in loss of salary.

== Judgment ==
The county court judge held that there was no contract as there had been no authorised communication of intention to contract on the part of the body, that is, the managers, alleged to be a party to the contract. This decision was upheld by the King's Bench Division. bsidshd
