= Gibson v Manchester City Council =

1979 English contract law case

Gibson v Manchester CC
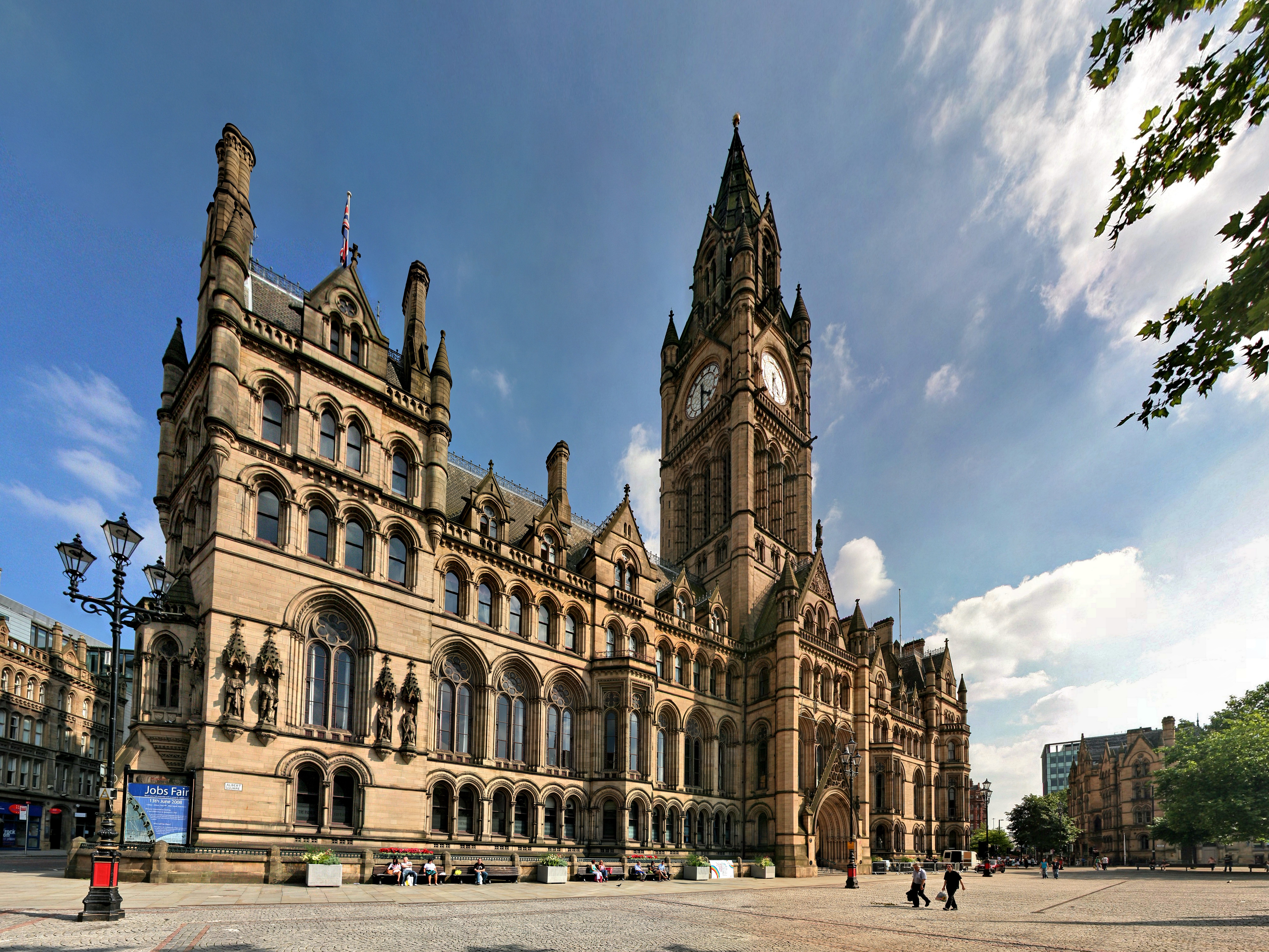
- Court: House of Lords
- Citations: [1979] UKHL 6, [1979] 1 WLR 294, [1979] 1 All ER 972

Case history
- Prior action: [1978] 1 WLR 520

Case opinions
- Lord Diplock, Lord Edmund-Davies, Lord Fraser of Tullybelton, Lord Russell of Killowen, Lord Keith of Kinkel

Keywords
- Agreement, offer, acceptance, invitation to treat

Gibson v Manchester City Council [1979] UKHL 6 is an English contract law case in which the House of Lords strongly reasserted that agreement only exists when there is a clear offer mirrored by a clear acceptance.

== Facts ==
Manchester City Council was being run by the Conservative Party, which was operating a policy of selling council houses to the occupants. Mr Gibson applied, on a form of the council, for details of his house price and mortgage terms. In February 1971, the Treasurer replied:

The corporation may be prepared to sell the house to you at the purchase price of £2,725 less 20% = £2,180 (freehold)... This letter should not be regarded as a firm offer of a mortgage. If you would like to make formal application to buy your Council house please complete the enclosed application form and return it to me as soon as possible.

In March 1971, Mr Gibson completed the application form with the exception of the date on which his lease was to end, and returned it to the council. The Labour Party returned to power in Manchester in the May 1971 election, and halted new sales. Mr Gibson was told that he could not complete the purchase. He then sued the council, arguing that a binding contract had already come into force.

== Judgment ==
=== Court of Appeal ===
In the Court of Appeal, Lord Denning MR held that there was a contract, because one should "look at the correspondence as a whole and at the conduct of the parties and see there from whether the parties have come to an agreement on everything that was material".

Geoffrey Lane LJ dissented, and would have held there was no contract. The council appealed.

=== House of Lords ===
The House of Lords unanimously upheld the council's appeal, so Mr Gibson did not get his house. The court held that the council's letter was not an offer, for the letter stated that "The Corporation may be prepared to sell the house to you" and that "If you would like to make formal application to buy your Council house, please complete the enclosed application form and return it to me as soon as possible." As there was never an offer available to be accepted, no contract had been formed and by extension the Council had not been in breach.

Lord Diplock said the following:

Lord Justice Geoffrey Lane in a dissenting judgment, which for my part I find convincing, adopted the conventional approach. He found that upon the true construction of the documents relied upon as constituting the contract, there never was an offer by the corporation acceptance of which by Mr. Gibson was capable in law of constituting a legally enforceable contract. It was but a step in the negotiations for a contract which, owing to the change in the political complexion of the council, never reached fruition.

My Lords, there may be certain types of contract, though I think they are exceptional, which do not fit easily into the normal analysis of a contract as being constituted by offer and acceptance; but a contract alleged to have been made by an exchange of correspondence between the parties in which the successive communications other than the first are in reply to one another, is not one of these. I can see no reason in the instant case for departing from the conventional approach of looking at the handful of documents relied upon as constituting the contract sued upon and seeing whether upon their true construction there is to be found in them a contractual offer by the corporation to sell the house to Mr. Gibson and an acceptance of that offer by Mr. Gibson. I venture to think that it was by departing from this conventional approach that the majority of the Court of Appeal was led into error.

My Lords, the words I have italicised seem to me, as they seemed to Geoffrey Lane LJ, to make it quite impossible to construe this letter as a contractual offer capable of being converted into a legally enforceable open contract for the sale of land by Mr. Gibson's written acceptance of it. The words "may be prepared to sell" are fatal to this; so is the invitation, not, be it noted, to accept the offer, but "to make formal application to buy" upon the enclosed application form. It is, to quote Geoffrey Lane LJ, a letter setting out the financial terms on which it may be the council will be prepared to consider a sale and purchase in due course.

I therefore feel compelled to allow the appeal. One can sympathise with Mr Gibson's disappointment on finding that his expectations that he would be able to buy his council house at 20 per cent below its market value in the autumn of 1970 cannot be realised. Whether one thinks this makes it a hard case perhaps depends upon the political views that one holds about council housing policy. But hard cases offer a strong temptation to let them have their proverbial consequences. It is a temptation that the judicial mind must be vigilant to resist.

Lord Russell of Killowen agreed, and stated:

My Lords, I cannot bring myself to accept that a letter which says that the possible vendor "May be prepared to sell the house to you" can be regarded as an offer to sell capable of acceptance so as to constitute a contract. The language simply does not permit such a construction. Nor can the statement that the letter should not be regarded as a firm offer of a mortgage operate to turn into a firm offer to sell that which quite plainly it was not.

== See also ==
- Butler Machine Tool Co Ltd v Ex-Cell-O Corp Ltd [1977] EWCA Civ 9
