= Entores Ltd v Miles Far East Corp =

Landmark 1955 English court decision

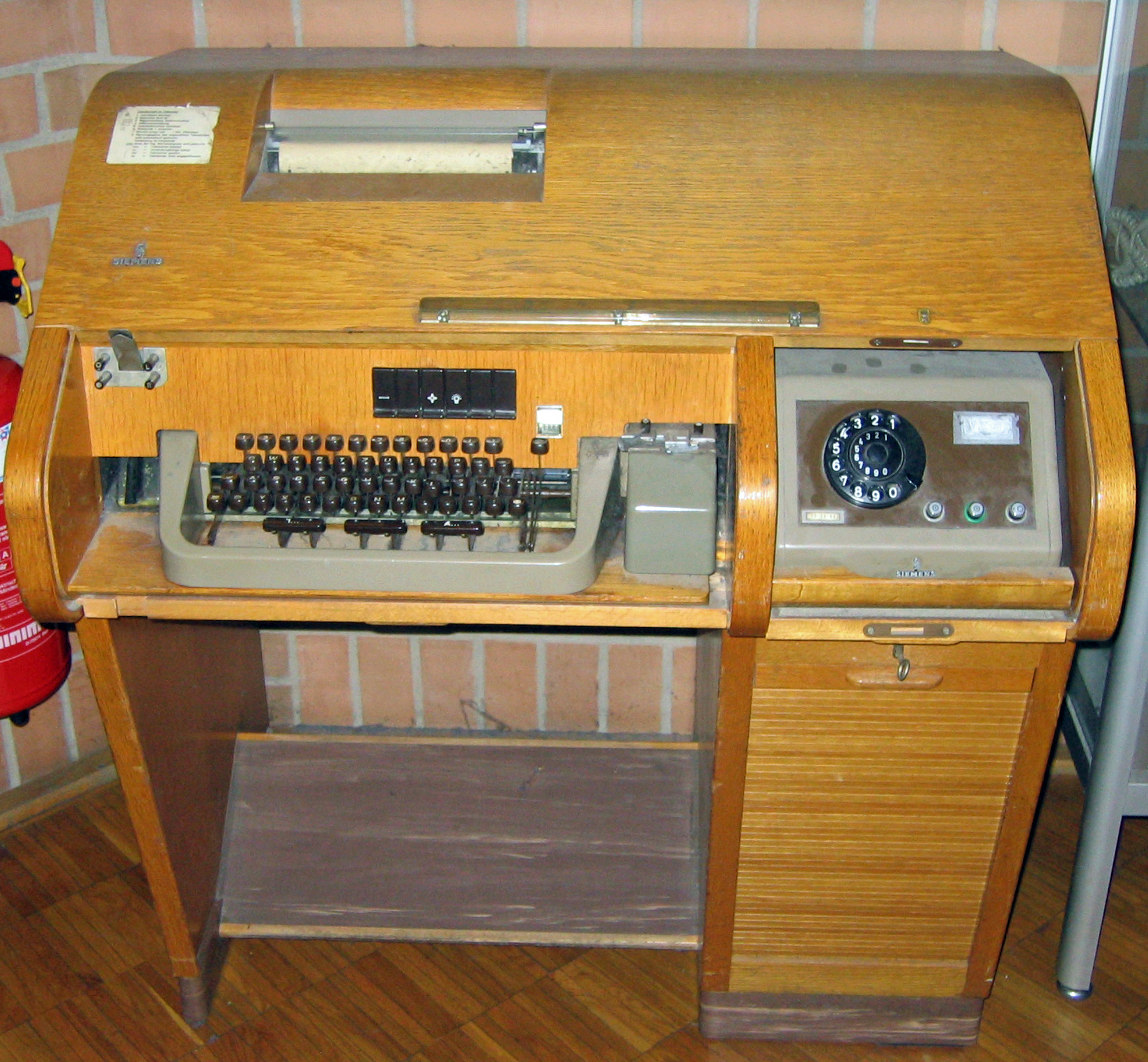
- Court: Court of Appeal of England and Wales
- Decided: 17 May 1955
- Citations: [1955] EWCA Civ 3, [1955] 2 QB 327

Court membership
- Judges sitting: Denning LJ, Birkett LJ, Parker LJ

Case opinions
- Denning LJ, Birkett LJ, Parker LJ

Keywords
- telex, acceptance, communication, postal "rule"

Entores Ltd v Miles Far East Corporation [1955] EWCA Civ 3 is a landmark English Court of Appeal decision in contract law relating to the moment of acceptance of a contract agreed over telex. Denning LJ found that the regular postal rule did not apply for instantaneous means of communications such as a telex. Instead, acceptance occurs when and where the message of acceptance is received.

== Facts ==
Entores was a London-based trading company that sent an offer by telex for the purchase of copper cathodes from a company based in Amsterdam. The Dutch company sent an acceptance by telex. The contract was not fulfilled and so Entores attempted to sue the owner of the Dutch company for damages. The controlling company, Entores, was based in the UK, and under English law Entores could only bring the action in the UK (serve notice of writ outside the jurisdiction) if it could prove that the contract was formed within the jurisdiction, i.e. in London rather than Amsterdam.

== Judgment ==
Denning LJ, delivered the leading judgment. He said that the postal rule could not apply to instantaneous communications, such as telephone or telex: if a phoneline "went dead" just before the offeree said "yes", it would be absurd to assume that the contract was formed - the parties would have to call each other back. The same applied to telex. Since the contract was therefore only formed when and where the telex was received, the place of formation was London.

there was a completed contract by which the defendants agreed to supply 100 tons of cathodes at a price of £239 10s. a ton. The offer was sent by Telex from England offering to pay £239 10s. a ton for 100 tons, and accepted by Telex from Holland. The question for our determination is where was the contract made?

When a contract is made by post it is clear law throughout the common law countries that the acceptance is complete as soon as the letter is put into the post box, and that is the place where the contract is made. But there is no clear rule about contracts made by telephone or by Telex. Communications by these means are virtually instantaneous and stand on a different footing.

The problem can only be solved by going in stages. Let me first consider a case where two people make a contract by word of mouth in the presence of one another. Suppose, for instance, that I shout an offer to a man across a river or a courtyard but I do not hear his reply because it is drowned by an aircraft flying overhead. There is no contract at that moment. If he wishes to make a contract, he must wait till the aircraft is gone and then shout back his acceptance so that I can hear what he says. Not until I have his answer am I bound. I do not agree with the observations of Hill J in Newcomb v De Roos.

Now take a case where two people make a contract by telephone. Suppose, for instance, that I make an offer to a man by telephone and, in the middle of his reply, the line goes "dead" so that I do not hear his words of acceptance. There is no contract at that moment. The other man may not know the precise moment when the line failed. But he will know that the telephone conversation was abruptly broken off: because people usually say something to signify the end of the conversation. If he wishes to make a contract, he must therefore get through again so as to make sure that I heard. Suppose next, that the line does not go dead, but it is nevertheless so indistinct that I do not catch what he says and I ask him to repeat it. He then repeats it and I hear his acceptance. The contract is made, not on the first time when I do not hear, but only the second time when I do hear. If he does not repeat it, there is no contract. The contract is only complete when I have his answer accepting the offer.

Lastly, take the Telex. Suppose a clerk in a London office taps out on the teleprinter an offer which is immediately recorded on a teleprinter in a Manchester office, and a clerk at that end taps out an acceptance. If the line goes dead in the middle of the sentence of acceptance, the teleprinter motor will stop. There is then obviously no contract. The clerk at Manchester must get through again and send his complete sentence. But it may happen that the line does not go dead, yet the message does not get through to London. Thus the clerk at Manchester may tap out his message of acceptance and it will not be recorded in London because the ink at the London end fails, or something of that kind. In that case, the Manchester clerk will not know of the failure but the London clerk will know of it and will immediately send back a message "not receiving." Then, when the fault is rectified, the Manchester clerk will repeat his message. Only then is there a contract. If he does not repeat it, there is no contract. It is not until his message is received that the contract is complete.

In all the instances I have taken so far, the man who sends the message of acceptance knows that it has not been received or he has reason to know it. So he must repeat it. But, suppose that he does not know that his message did not get home. He thinks it has. This may happen if the listener on the telephone does not catch the words of acceptance, but nevertheless does not trouble to ask for them to be repeated: or the ink on the teleprinter fails at the receiving end, but the clerk does not ask for the message to be repeated: so that the man who sends an acceptance reasonably believes that his message has been received. The offeror in such circumstances is clearly bound, because he will be estopped from saying that he did not receive the message of acceptance. It is his own fault that he did not get it. But if there should be a case where the offeror without any fault on his part does not receive the message of acceptance - yet the sender of it reasonably believes it has got home when it has not - then I think there is no contract.

My conclusion is, that the rule about instantaneous communications between the parties is different from the rule about the post. The contract is only complete when the acceptance is received by the offeror: and the contract is made at the place where the acceptance is received.

In a matter of this kind, however, it is very important that the countries of the world should have the same rule. I find that most of the European countries have substantially the same rule as that I have stated. Indeed, they apply it to contracts by post as well as instantaneous communications. But in the United States of America it appears as if instantaneous communications are treated in the same way as postal communications. In view of this divergence, I think that we must consider the matter on principle: and so considered, I have come to the view I have stated, and I am glad to see that Professor Winfield in this country (55 Law Quarterly Review 514), and Professor Williston in the United States of America (Contracts, § 82, p. 239), take the same view.

Applying the principles which I have stated, I think that the contract in this case was made in London where the acceptance was received. It was, therefore, a proper case for service out of the jurisdiction.

Apart from the contract by Telex, the plaintiffs put the case in another way. They say that the contract by Telex was varied by letter posted in Holland and accepted by conduct in England: and that this amounted to a new contract made in England. The Dutch company on September 11, 1954, wrote a letter to the English company saying: "We confirm having sold to you for account of our associates in Tokyo: 100 metric tons electrolitic copper in cathodes: £239 10s. for longton c.i.f. U.K./ Continental main ports: prompt shipment from a Japanese port after receipt of export licence: payment by irrevocable and transferable letter of credit to be opened in favour of Miles Far East Corporation with a first class Tokyo Bank. The respective import licences to be sent directly without delay to Miles Far East Corporation." The variations consisted in the ports of delivery, the provisions of import licence and so forth. The English company say that they accepted the variations by dispatching from London the import licence, and giving instructions in London for the opening of the letter of credit, and that this was an acceptance by conduct which was complete as soon as the acts were done in London.

I am not sure that this argument about variations is correct. It may well be that the contract is made at the place where first completed; not at the place where the variations are agreed. But whether this be so or not, I think the variations were accepted by conduct in London and were therefore made in England. Both the original contract and ensuing variations were made in England and leave can properly be given for service out of the jurisdiction.

I am inclined to think also that the contract is by implication to be governed by English law, because England is the place with which it has the closest connection.

I think that the decisions of the master and the judge were right, and I would dismiss the appeal.

== See also ==
- Brinkibon Ltd v Stahag Stahl und Stahlwarenhandelsgesellschaft mbH
- The Brimnes
