= Brinkibon Ltd v Stahag Stahl und Stahlwarenhandelsgesellschaft mbH =

Brinkibon Ltd v Stahag Stahl GmbH
- Court: House of Lords
- Full case name: Brinkibon Ltd v Stahag Stahl und Stahlwarenhandelsgesellschaft mbH
- Citation: [1983] 2 AC 34

Court membership
- Judges sitting: Lord Wilberforce, Lord Fraser of Tullybelton, Lord Russell of Killowen, Lord Bridge of Harwich and Lord Brandon of Oakbrook

Keywords
- Acceptance, communication

Brinkibon Ltd v Stahag Stahl GmbH [1983] 2 AC 34 is a landmark decision of the House of Lords on the formation of a contract using modern communication. The Lords largely accepted the earlier leading decision of Entores v Miles Far East Co. [1955] 2 QB 327 on acceptance via telex.

== Facts ==
Brinkibon was a London company that bought steel from Stahag, a seller based in Austria. Brinkibon sent their acceptance to a Stahag offer by telex to Vienna. Brinkibon later wanted to issue a writ against Stahag and applied to serve an out of jurisdiction party. They would only be able to do so if the contract had been formed in England.

The question at issue was where the contract was formed.

== Judgment ==
The Judges decided that the contract was formed in Vienna. They accepted the principle in Entores v Miles Far East Co where in the case of instantaneous communication, which included telex, the formation generally occurs in the place where the acceptance is received.

Lord Wilberforce, however, did not see the rule as applying in all circumstances:

.... it appears logical that this should be at the place where acceptance is communicated to the offeror....

... I would accept it as a general rule. Where the condition of simultaneity is met, and where it appears to be within the mutual intention of the parties that contractual exchanges should take place in this way, I think it a sound rule, but not necessarily a universal rule...

Since 1955 the use of Telex communication has been greatly expanded, and there are many variants on it. The senders and recipients may not be the principals to the contemplated contract. They may be servants or agents with limited authority. The message may not reach, or be intended to reach, the designated recipient immediately: messages may be sent out of office hours, or at night, with the intention, or on the assumption that they will be read at a later time. There may be some error or default at the recipient’s end which prevents receipt at the time contemplated and believed in by the sender. The message may have been sent and/or received through machines operated by third persons. And many other variants may occur. No universal rule can cover all such cases; they must be resolved by reference to the intentions of the parties, by sound business practice and in some cases by a judgement where the risks should lie.

Lord Brandon said the following.

Unquestionably, as a general proposition, when an offer is made, it is necessary in order to make a binding contract, not only that it should be accepted, but that the acceptance should be notified.’ And the postal rule is an exception based on ‘commercial expediency… more convenient, and makes on the whole for greater fairness, than the general rule itself would do.

== See also ==
- English contract law
