= Adams v Lindsell =

1818 English contract law case which introduced the postal rule

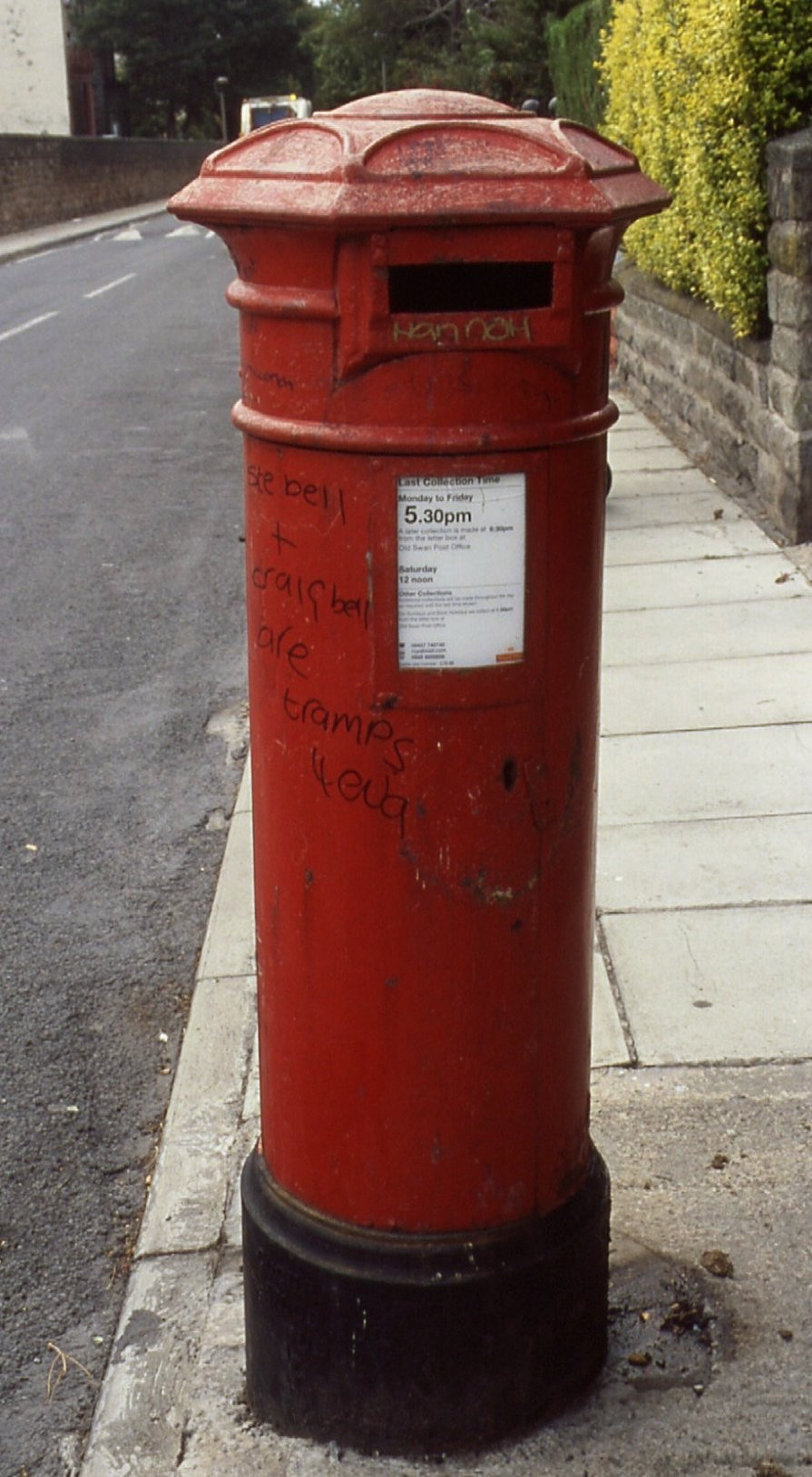
- Court: King's Bench
- Full case name: Adams & Ors v Lindsell & Ors
- Decided: 5 June 1818
- Citation: [1818] EWHC KB J59; (1818) 1 B & Ald 681; 106 ER 250

Court membership
- Judge sitting: Law J

Case opinions
- Law J

Keywords
- Offer and acceptance, postal rule

Adams v Lindsell (1818) 1 B & Ald 681, is an English contract case regarded as the first case towards the establishment of the "postal rule" for acceptance of an offer. Ordinarily, any form of acceptance must be communicated expressly to an offeror; however, it was found that where a letter of acceptance is posted, an offer is accepted "in course of post".

== Facts ==
The case involved two parties in the sale of wool. On 2 September, the defendants wrote to the plaintiffs offering to sell them certain fleeces of wool and requiring an answer in the course of post. The defendants misdirected the letter so that the plaintiffs did not receive it until 5 September. The plaintiffs posted their acceptance on the same day but it was not received until 9 September. Meanwhile, on 8 September, the defendants, not having received an answer by 7 September as they had expected, sold the wool to someone else.

The defendants argued that there could not be a binding contract until the answer was actually received, and until then they were free to sell the wool to another buyer.

== Judgment ==
Law J said that if that was true it would be impossible to complete any contract through the post; if the defendants were not bound by their offer until the answer was received, then the plaintiffs would not be bound until they had received word that the defendants had received their acceptance, and this could go on indefinitely. Instead it must be considered that the offerors were making the offer to the plaintiffs during every moment that the letter was in the post. Then when the Offeree has placed his acceptance in the post there is a meeting of minds, which concludes the offer and gives effect to the acceptance.

The acceptance did not arrive in course of post strictly speaking (all parties understood in course of post to refer to 7 September). But because the delay was the fault of the defendant it was taken that the acceptance did arrive in course of post.

== Significance ==
This case is the first step towards establishing the postal acceptance rule (mailbox rule). It was not until 1892 in Henthorn v Fraser [1892] 2 Ch 27 that the court determined the precise timing of the acceptance, that is the moment the letter of acceptance is posted. (See also Entores Ltd v Miles Far East Corporation [1955] 2 QB 327).

== See also ==
- Agreement in English law
- Offer and acceptance
