= Posting rule =

A mailed contract is accepted when the letter is posted

The posting rule (or mailbox rule in the United States, also known as the "postal rule" or "deposited acceptance rule") is an exception to the general rule of contract law in common law countries that acceptance of an offer takes place when communicated. Under the posting rule, that acceptance takes effect when a letter is posted (that is, dropped in a post box or handed to a postal worker); the post office will be the universal service provider, such as the UK's Royal Mail, the Australia Post, or the United States Postal Service. In plain English, the "meeting of the minds" necessary to contract formation occurs at the exact moment word of acceptance is sent via post by the person accepting it, rather than when that acceptance is received by the person who offered the contract.

The rules of contracts by post (postal rules) include the following:

1. An offer made by post/letter is not effective until received by the offeree.
2. Acceptance is effective as soon as it is posted.
3. For revocation to be effective, it must be received by the offeree before they post their letter of acceptance.

One rationale given for the rule is that the offeror nominates the post office as their implied agent, and thus receipt of the acceptance by the post office is regarded as receipt by the offeror. The main effect of the posting rule is that the risk of acceptance being delivered late or lost in the post is placed upon the offeror. If the offeror is reluctant to accept this risk, he can always expressly require actual receipt as a condition before being legally bound by his offer.

== English case law ==
The rule was established by a series of 19th century cases, starting with Adams v Lindsell (1818) B & Ald 681, which was later confirmed and expanded in Dunlop v Higgins (1848) 1 HL Cas 381, Household Fire and Carriage Accident Insurance Co Ltd v Grant (1879) 4 Ex D 216 and Henthorn v Fraser [1892] 2 Ch 27.

The posting rule applies only to acceptance. Other contractual letters (such as one revoking the offer) do not take effect until the letter is delivered, as in Stevenson, Jacques & Co v McLean (1880) 5 QBD 346. The implication of this is that it is possible for a letter of acceptance to be posted after a letter of revocation of the offer has been posted but before it is delivered, and acceptance will be complete at the time that the letter of acceptance was posted—the offeror's revocation would be inoperative.

Example 1:

- Day 1: A makes an offer to B.
- Day 2: A decides to revoke the offer and puts a letter in the mail to B revoking the offer.
- Day 3: B puts a letter accepting the offer in the mail.
- Day 4: B receives A's revocation letter.
  - The letter of revocation can be effective only when received, that is Day 4.
  - However, a contract was formed on Day 3 when the letter of acceptance was posted.
  - It is too late for A to revoke the offer.

Example 2:

- Day 1: A makes an offer to B.
- Day 2: B intends to reject the offer by putting a letter in the mail to A rejecting the offer.
- Day 3: B changes his mind and sends a fax to A accepting the offer.
  - In this situation, whichever communication A receives first will govern.

Example 3:

- Day 1: A makes an offer to sell a parcel of land to B.
- Day 2: B mails her acceptance.
- Day 3: Before A receives B's acceptance, B telephones A and states she wishes to reject the offer.
- Day 4: B's original letter of acceptance arrives, A then records the contract as a sale.
  - B's acceptance of the offer means there is a binding contract – she is obliged to pay for the land or be liable for damages.
  - B is just rejecting the offer, she did not actually revoke her acceptance

Under the posting rule, performance is a means of acceptance. If A orders 1000 blue coathangers and B ships them out, that shipment is considered to be a conveyance of acceptance of A's offer to buy the coathangers. Defective performance is also an acceptance, unless accompanied by an explanation. For example, if A orders 1000 blue coathangers, and B mistakenly ships 1000 red coathangers, this is still an acceptance of the contract. However, if B ships the red coathangers with a note that they sent these because they had run out of blue coathangers, this is not an acceptance, but rather an accommodation, which is a form of counter-offer.

An interesting implication of the operation of the posting rule is that an acceptance is complete once the letter of acceptance is posted; it makes no difference whether the offeror actually receives the letter. This was demonstrated in Byrne v Van Tienhoven (1880) 5 CPD 344. If a letter of acceptance were to be lost, acceptance has still taken place.

Furthermore, the posting rule does not apply to instantaneous forms of communications. For example, in Entores Ltd v Miles Far East Corporation [1955] 2 QB 327, the Court held that the posting rule did not apply to an acceptance by telex as the Court regarded it as an instantaneous form of communication. The general principle that acceptance takes place when communicated applies to instantaneous forms of communication. Courts have similarly held that the posting rule does apply to acceptances by telephone or fax.

The courts are yet to decide whether e-mail should be regarded as an instantaneous form of communication. If the offeree were to convey acceptance by commercially unreasonable means – by cross-country pony express, for example – the acceptance would not be effective until it had actually been received.

A letter is regarded as "posted" only when it is in the possession of the Post Office; this was established in the case of Re London & Northern Bank [1900] 1 Ch 220. A letter of acceptance is not considered "posted" if it is handed to an agent to deliver, such as a courier. This is not the case under the Uniform Commercial Code.

The posting rule does not apply to option contracts or irrevocable offers where acceptance is still effective only upon receipt. This is because the offeree no longer needs protection against subsequently mailed revocations of the offer.

Where parties are at distance from one another, and an offer is sent by mail, it is universally held in this country [United States] that the reply accepting the offer may be sent through the same medium, and, if it is so sent, the contract will be complete when the acceptance is mailed, ... and beyond the acceptor's control; the theory being that, when one makes an offer through the mail, he authorizes the acceptance to be made through the same medium his agent to receive his acceptance; that the acceptance, when mailed, is then constructively communicated to the offeror.

— Excerpt of an opinion by Judge Kimmelman (718 A.2d 1223)

== American case law ==
The Court of Appeals for the Third District of Texas considered the mailbox rule in 1994 in the case of Cantu v Central Education Agency and others. The Texas Business and Commercial Code, following the Uniform Commercial Code, states that "unless otherwise unambiguously indicated by the language or circumstances, ... (1) an offer to make a contract shall be construed as inviting acceptance in any manner and by any medium reasonable in the circumstances". Cantu had hand-delivered a letter resigning from an offered contract of employment to the Central Education Agency's office in San Benito on a Saturday, and it was therefore read by its recipient on the Monday morning. The letter stated that outstanding pay should be forwarded to an address in McAllen, around 50 miles (80 km) from San Benito. A letter was posted back on the Monday evening, accepting the resignation. On the Tuesday morning, Cantu hand-delivered a letter withdrawing her resignation, but the superintendent of schools advised her that her resignation had already been accepted, by virtue of an acceptance letter being posted to the McAllen address. Cantu argued that postal acceptance was not valid because her withdrawal letter had been hand-delivered. The trial court and the appeal court accepted the Agency's opinion that it was reasonable, taking account of all the circumstances, for the Agency to accept the resignation by mail.

The majority rule in the United States is that the mailbox rule does not apply to option contracts. By default, an option contract is accepted when the offeror receives the acceptance, not when the offeree mails it. However, because the California Civil Code applies the mailbox rule to all contracts, California follows the minority rule, under which the mailbox rule does also apply to option contracts.

== Australian case law ==
In Tallerman & Co Pty Ltd v Nathan's Merchandise (1957) 98 CLR 93, 111-112 Dixon CJ and Fullagar J took a more restrictive view. "The general rule is that a contract is not completed until acceptance of an offer is actually communicated to the offeror, and a finding that a contract is completed by the posting of a letter of acceptance cannot be justified unless it is to be inferred that the offeror contemplated and intended that his offer might be accepted by the doing of that act." The High Court included the element of intention.

== Civil law jurisdictions ==
Civil law jurisdictions do not follow the postal rule. The classical civil law position is that acceptance, like any expression of will, can only be effective if it was communicated to the addressee, unless the lack of communication can be attributed to the latter. The Vienna Convention on the International Sale of Goods chooses a compromise between the two approaches: According to article 18(2) of the Convention, an acceptance is effective when it reaches the offeror. However, article 16(1) of the Convention provides for the most important consequence of the common law "posting rule", that is, an offer may not be revoked if the revocation reaches the offeree after it has dispatched an acceptance.

== UNCITRAL model law ==
Many countries have enacted legislation based on the UNCITRAL Model Law of Electronic Commerce. Such legislation is often entitled the Electronic Transactions Act. Among other issues, this legislation deals a default rule for the time that email (electronic communications) is sent and when it is received. However it is mistaken to suggest that it deals with a clarification of the postal acceptance rule for electronic communications. There are two schools of thought.

1. Ask if the postal acceptance rule applies to emails (electronic communications). If your answer is yes, then the relevant Electronic Transaction Act (ETA) can help. The postal acceptance rule states that there is a contract when posted – so we should apply the "sent" rule under the ETA. If the answer is no; then either apply the "received" rule under the ETA or ignore it and use the contract rule of communication.
2. Instead, treat the Electronic Transactions Act as an intended substitute and statutory replacement of the postal acceptance rule; in which case the "received" rule should apply. The problem with this second school of thought is that there is nothing in the Model Law of Electronic Commerce, nor the ETAs which suggests that it was intended to replace the postal acceptance rule. We are still waiting for a court to decide.

The UNCITRAL rules on time of sending and receiving are:

1. Unless otherwise agreed between the originator and the addressee, the dispatch of a data message occurs when it enters an information system outside the control of the originator or of the person who sent the data message on behalf of the originator.
2. Unless otherwise agreed between the originator and the addressee, the time of receipt of a data message is determined as follows:

(a) if the addressee has designated an information system for the purpose of receiving data messages, receipt occurs:

(i) at the time when the data message enters the designated information system; or
(ii) if the data message is sent to an information system of the addressee that is not the designated information system, at the time when the data message is retrieved by the addressee;

(b) if the addressee has not designated an information system, receipt occurs when the data message enters an information system of the addressee.

== See also ==
- Offer and acceptance
- Transaction documents
