= Implied-in-fact contract =

US legal concept

An implied-in-fact contract is a form of an implied contract formed by non-verbal conduct, rather than by explicit words. The United States Supreme Court has defined "an agreement 'implied in fact'" as "founded upon a meeting of minds, which, although not embodied in an express contract, is inferred, as a fact, from conduct of the parties showing, in the light of the surrounding circumstances, their tacit understanding."

Although the parties may not have exchanged words of agreement, their conduct may indicate that an agreement existed.

For example, if a patient goes to a doctor's appointment, the patient's actions indicate that they intend to receive treatment in exchange for paying reasonable/fair doctor's fees. Likewise, by seeing the patient, the doctor's actions indicate that they intend to treat the patient in exchange for payment of the bill. Therefore, it seems that a contract actually existed between the doctor and the patient, even though nobody spoke any words of agreement. (They both agreed to the same essential terms, and acted in accordance with that agreement. There was mutuality of consideration.) In such a case, the court will probably find that (as a matter of fact) the parties had an implied contract. If the patient refuses to pay after being examined, they will have breached the implied contract. Another example of an implied contract is the payment method known as a letter of credit.

Generally, an implied contract has the same legal force as an express contract. However, it may be more difficult to prove the existence and terms of an implied contract should a dispute arise. In some jurisdictions, contracts involving real estate may not be created on an implied-in-fact basis, requiring the transaction to be in writing.

Unilateral contracts are often the subject matter of these types of contracts where acceptance is being made by beginning a specified task.

== Potential conduct implying implied contract ==
- A prior history of similar agreements.
- When recipient accepts something of value knowing other party expects payment.

== See also ==
- Implied in law contract
- Statute of frauds
