= Hong Kong Fir Shipping Co Ltd v Kawasaki Kisen Kaisha Ltd =

1962 English contract law case

The Hong Kong Fir
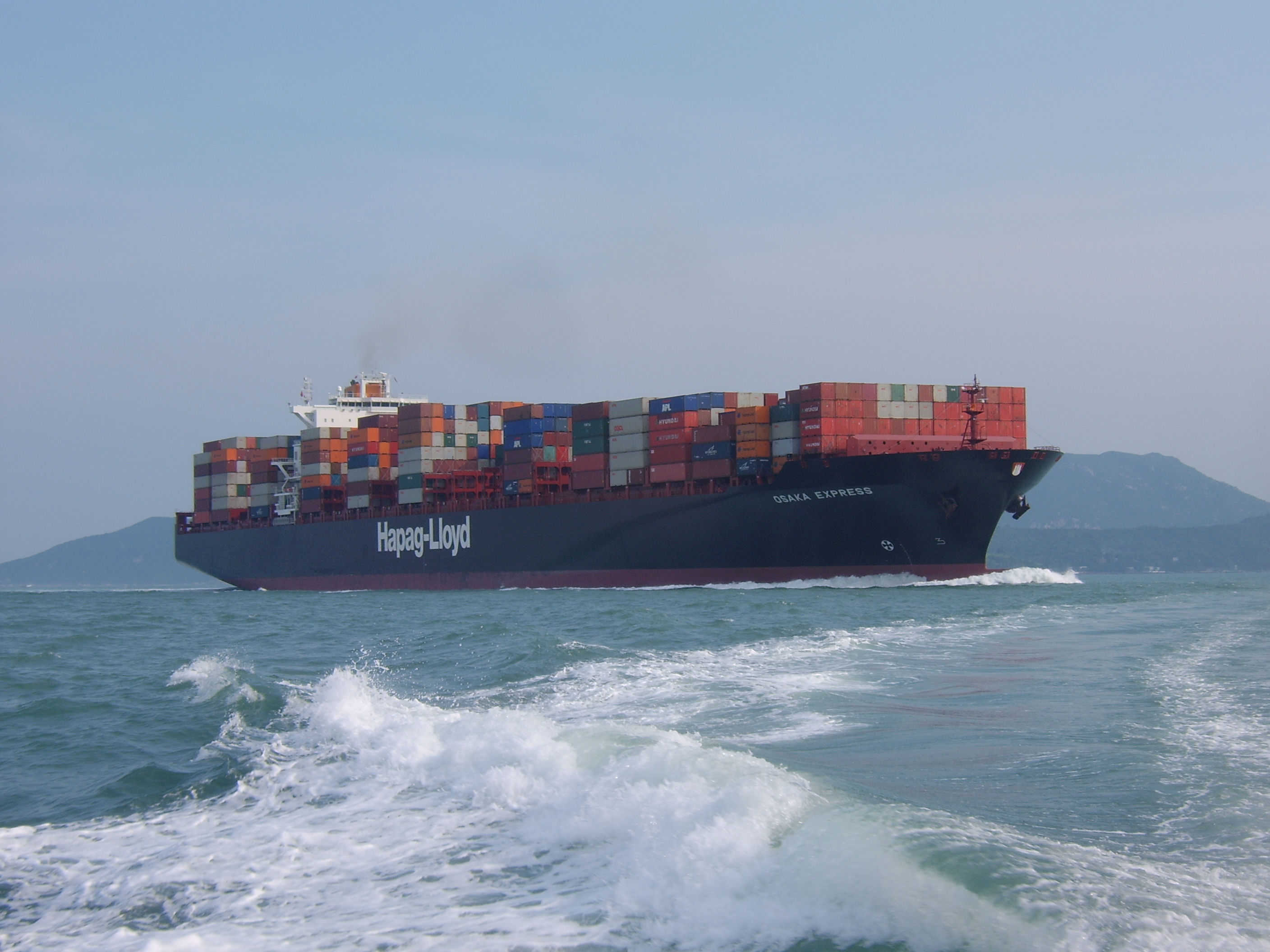
- Court: Court of Appeal
- Full case name: Hong Kong Fir Shipping Co Ltd v Kawasaki Kisen Kaisha Ltd
- Citations: [1961] EWCA Civ 7, [1962] 2 QB 26, [1962] 1 All ER 474
- Transcript: Full text of judgment

Hong Kong Fir Shipping Co Ltd v Kawasaki Kisen Kaisha Ltd [1962] 2 QB 26 [1961] EWCA Civ 7 is a landmark English contract law case. It introduced the concept of innominate terms, a category between "warranties" and "conditions".

Under the English sale of goods principles, a condition is a term whose breach entitles the injured party to repudiate the contract, but a breach of warranty shall give rise only to damages. In this case, Diplock LJ proposed that some terms could lead either to the right to terminate a contract as a remedy, or to the mere entitlement to damages (without a right to terminate). What mattered was not whether a particular contract term was called a "warranty" or a "condition", but how serious was the breach of the term.

In short, the test for whether or not one may repudiate has now become, "does the breach deny the claimant the main benefit of the contract?" However, modern commercial custom has since established that some breaches, such as failure to meet a "notice of readiness to load" a sea cargo, will always be repudiatory.

== Facts ==
Hong Kong Fir Shipping hired out their elderly ship, the "Hong Kong Fir", to Kawasaki Kisen Kaisha under a two-year time charter-party. It was to sail in ballast from Liverpool to collect a cargo at Newport News, Virginia, and then to proceed via Panama to Osaka. A term in the charterparty agreement required the ship to be seaworthy and to be "in every way fitted for ordinary cargo service". However the crew were both insufficient in number and incompetent to maintain her old-fashioned machinery; and the chief engineer was a drunkard. On the voyage from Liverpool to Osaka, the engines suffered several breakdowns, and was off-hire for a total of five weeks, undergoing repairs. On arrival at Osaka, a further fifteen weeks of repairs were needed before the ship was seaworthy again. By this time, barely seventeen months of the two-year time-charter remained. Once in Osaka, market freight rates fell, and Kawasaki terminated the contract citing Hong Kong's breach. Hong Kong responded that Kawasaki were now the party in breach for wrongfully repudiating the contract.

At first instance, it was held that although the ship was a seaworthy vessel on delivery in Liverpool, Hong Kong Fir had not exercised due diligence to maintain the vessel in an efficient and seaworthy state. However, the trial judge found that this breach was not substantial enough to entitle the charterer to repudiate the contract. Kawasaki appealed.

== Judgment ==
The Court of Appeal held that the "seaworthiness" term was not breached in a sufficiently serious way to entitle the charterer to terminate. It was an "innominate term". Diplock LJ's judgment went as follows:

Every synallagmatic contract contains in it the seeds of the problems In what event will a party be relieved of his undertaking to do that which he has agreed to do but has not yet done? The contract may itself expressly define some of these events, as in the cancellation clause in a charter-party; but, human prescience being limited, it seldom does so exhaustively and often fails to do so at all. In some classes of contracts such as sale of goods, marine insurance, contracts of affreightment evidenced by bills of lading and those between parties to bills of exchange, Parliament has defined by statute some of the events not provided for expressly in individual contracts of that class; but where an event occurs the occurrence of which neither the parties nor Parliament have expressly stated will discharge one of the parties from further performance of his undertakings it is for the court to determine whether the event has this effect or not.

The test of whether an event has this effect or not has been stated in a number of metaphors all of which I think amount to the same things Does the occurrence of the event deprive the party who has further undertakings still to perform of substantially the whole benefit which it was the intention of the parties as expressed in the contract that he should obtain as the consideration for performing those undertakings?

This test is applicable whether or not the event occurs as a result of the default of one of the parties to the contract, but the consequences of the event are different in the two cases. Where the event occurs as a result of the default of one party the party in default cannot rely upon it as relieving himself of the performance of any further undertakings on his part and the innocent party, although entitled to, need not treat the event as relieving him of the performance of his own undertakings. This is only a specific application of the fundamental legal and moral rule that a man should not be allowed to take advantage of his own wrong. Where the event occurs as a result of the default of neither party each is relieved of the further performance of his own undertakings and their rights in respect of undertakings previously performed are now regulated by the Law Reform (Frustrated Contracts) Act 1943.

This branch of the common law has reached its present stage by the normal process of historical growth, and the fallacy in Mr. Ashton Roskill's contention that a different test is applicable when the event occurs as a result of the default of one party from that applicable in cases of frustration where the event occurs as a result of the default of neither party lies, in my view, from a failure to view the cases in their historical context. The problems in what event will a party to a contract be relieved of his undertaking to do that which he has agreed to do but has not yet done? has exercised the English Courts for centuries, probably ever since assumpsit emerged as a form of action distinct from covenant and debt and long before even the earliest cases which we have been invited to examine; but until the rigour of the rule in Paradine v Jane was mitigated in the middle of the last century by the classic judgments of Mr Justice Blackburn in Taylor v Caldwell and Baron Bramwell in Jackson v Union Marine Insurance it was, in general, only events resulting from one party's failure to perform his contractual obligations that were regarded as capable of relieving the other party from continuing to perform what he had undertaken.

In the earlier cases before the Common Law Procedure Act 1852, the problem tends to be obscured to modern readers by the rules of pleading peculiar to the relevant forms of action-covenant, debt and assumpsit, and the nomenclature adopted in the judgments, which were mainly on demurrer, reflects this. It was early recognised that contractual undertakings were of two different kinds; those collateral to the main purpose of the parties as expressed in the contract and those that were mutually dependent so that the non-performance of an undertaking of this class was an event that excused the other party from the performance of his corresponding undertakings. In the nomenclature of the eighteenth and early nineteenth centuries undertakings of the latter class were called "conditions precedent" and a plaintiff under the rules of pleading had to aver specially in his declaration his performance or readiness and willingness to perform all those contractual undertakings on his part that constituted conditions precedent to the defendant's undertaking for non-performance of which the action was brought. In the earliest cases such as Pordage v Cole and Thorpe v Thorpe the question whether an undertaking was a condition precedent appears to have turned upon the verbal niceties of the particular phrases used in the written contract and it was not until 1773 that Lord Mansfield, in the case, which is a legal landmark, Boone v Eyre, swept away these arid technicalities. "The distinction", he said,

"is very clear. Where mutual covenants go to the whole of the consideration on both sides they are mutual conditions, the one precedent to the other. But where they go only to a part, where a breach may be paid for in damages, there the defendant has a remedy on his covenant and shall not plead it as a condition precedent".

This too was a judgment on demurrer but the principle was the same when the substance of the matter was in issue. Other phrases expressing the same idea were used by other judges in the cases which have already been cited by Lord Justice Sellers, and I would only add to his comments upon them that when it is borne in mind that until the latter half of the nineteenth century the only event that could be relied upon to excuse performance by one party of his undertakings was a default by the other party no importance can be attached to the fact that in occasional cases, and there may be others besides Freeman v. Taylor (1831) 8 Bingham page 124, the Court has referred to the object or purpose of the party not in default rather than to the object or purpose of the contract, for the relevant object or purpose of the party not in default is that upon which there has been a consensus ad idem of both parties as expressed in the words which they have used in their contract construed in the light of the surrounding circumstances.

The fact that the emphasis in the earlier cases was upon the breach by one party to the contract of his contractual undertakings, for this was the commonest circumstance in which the question arose, tended to obscure the fact that it was really the event resulting from the breach which relieved the other party of further performance of his obligations; but the principle was applied early in the nineteenth century and without analysis to cases where the event relied upon was one brought about by a party to a contract before the time for performance of his undertakings arose but which would make it impossible to perform those obligations when the time to do so did arrive: for example, Short v Stone; Ford v Tiley; Bowdell v Parsons. It was not, however, until Jackson v. Union Marine Insurance (1874) 10 Common Pleas page 125, that it was recognised that it was the happening of the event and not the fact that the event was the result of a breach by one party of his contractual obligations that relieved the other party from further performance of his obligations. "There are the cases", said Baron Bramwell (at page 147. of the report in 10 Common Pleas)

"which hold that, where the shipowner has not merely broken his contract, but has so broken it that the condition precedent is not performed, the charterer is discharged. Why? Not merely because the contract is broken. If it is not a condition precedent, what matters it whether it is unperformed with or without excuse? Not arriving with due diligence or at a day named is the subject of a cross-action only. But not arriving in time for the voyage contemplated, but at such a time that it is frustrated is not only a breach of contract, but discharges the charterer. And so it should though he has such an excuse that no action lies".

Once it is appreciated that it is the event and not the fact that the event is a result of a breach of contract which relieves the party not in default of further performance of his obligations two consequences follow. (1) The test whether the event relied upon has this consequence is the same whether the event is the result of the other party's breach of contract or not, as Mr. Justice Devlin pointed out in Universal Cargo Carriers Corporation v Citati. (2) The question whether an event which is the result of the other party's breach of contract has this consequence cannot be answered by treating all contractual undertakings as falling into one of two separate categories: "conditions" the breach of which gives rise to an event which relieves the party not in default of further performance of his obligations, and "warranties" the breach of which does not give rise to such an event.

Lawyers tend to speak of this classification as if it were comprehensive, partly for the historical reasons which I have already mentioned and partly "because Parliament itself adopted it in the Sale of Goods Act, 1893, as respects a number of implied terms in contracts for the sale of goods and has in that Act used the expressions "condition" and "warranty" in that meaning. But it is by no means true of contractual undertakings in general at common law.

No doubt there are many simple contractual undertakings, sometimes express but more often because of their very simplicity ("It goes without saying") to be implied, of which it can be predicated that every breach of such an undertaking must give rise to an event which will deprive the party not in default of substantially the whole benefit which it was intended that he should obtain from the contract. And such a stipulation, unless the parties have agreed that breach of it shall not entitle the non-defaulting party to treat the contract as repudiated, is a "condition". So too there may be other simple contractual undertakings of which it can be predicated that no breach can give rise to an event which will deprive the party not in default of substantially the whole benefit which it was intended that he should obtain from the contract; and such a stipulation, unless the parties have agreed that breach of it shall entitle the non-defaulting party to treat the contract as repudiated, is a "warranty".

There are, however, many contractual undertakings of a. more complex character which cannot be categorised as being "conditions" or "warranties" if the late nineteenth century meaning adopted in the Sale of Goods Act, 1893, and used by Lord Justice Bowen in Bensen v Taylor Sons & Co be given to those terms. Of such undertakings all that can be predicated is that some breaches will and others will not give rise to an event which will deprive the party not in default of substantially the whole benefit which it was intended that he should obtain from the contract; and the legal consequences of a breach of such an undertaking, unless provided for expressly in the contract, depend upon the nature of the • event to which the breach gives rise and do not follow automatically from a prior classification of the undertaking as a "condition" or a "warranty". For instance, to take Baron Bramwell's example in Jackson v. Union Marine Insurance itself (at page 142), breach of an undertaking by a shipowner to sail with all possible dispatch to a named port does not necessarily relieve the charterer of further performance of his obligation under the charter-party, but if the breach is so prolonged that the contemplated voyage is frustrated it does have this effect.

In 1874 when the doctrine of frustration was being foaled by "impossibility of performance" out of "condition precedent" it is not surprising that the explanation given by Baron Bramwell should give full credit to the dam by suggesting that in addition to the express warranty to sail with all possible dispatch there was an implied condition precedent that the ship should arrive at the named port in time for the voyage contemplated. In Jackson v Union Marine Insurance there was no breach of the express warranty; but if there had been, to engraft the implied condition upon the express warranty would have been merely a more complicated way of saying that a breach of a shipowner's undertaking to sail with all possible dispatch may, but will not necessarily, give rise to an event which will deprive the charterer of substantially the whole benefit which it was intended that he should obtain from the charter. Now that the doctrine of frustration has matured and flourished for nearly a century and the old technicalities of pleading "conditions precedent" are more than a century out of date, it does not clarify, but on the contrary obscures, the modern principle of law where such an event has occurred as a result of a breach of an express stipulation in a contract, to continue to add the now unnecessary colophon "therefore it was an implied condition of the contract that a particular kind of breach of an express warranty should not occur." The common law evolves not merely by breeding new principles but also, when they are fully grown, by burying their ancestors.

As my "brethren have already pointed out, the shipowner's undertaking to tender a seaworthy ship has, as a result of numerous decisions as to what can amount to "unseaworthiness", become one of the most complex of contractual undertakings. It embraces obligations with respect to every part of the hull and machinery, stores and equipment and the crew itself. It can be broken by the presence of trivial defects easily and rapidly remediable as well as by defects which must inevitably result in a total loss of the vessel.

Consequently the problem in this case is, in my view, neither solved nor soluble by debating whether the shipowner's express or implied undertaking to tender a seaworthy ship is a "condition" or a "warranty". It is like so many other contractual terms an undertaking one breach of which may give rise to an event which relieves the charterer of further performance of his undertakings if he so elects and another breach of which may not give rise to such an event but entitle him only to monetary compensation in the form of damages. It is, with all deference to Mr. Ashton Roskill's skilful argument, by no means surprising that among the many hundreds of previous cases about the shipowner's undertaking to deliver a seaworthy ship there is none where it was found profitable to discuss in the judgments the question whether that undertaking is a "condition" or a "warranty"; for the true answer, as I have already indicated, is that it is neither, but one of that large class of contractual undertakings one breach of which may have the same effect as that ascribed to a breach of "condition" under the Sale of Goods Act and a different breach of which may have only the same effect as that ascribed to a breach of "warranty" under that Act. The cases referred to by Lord Justice Sellers illustrate this and I would only add that in the dictum which he cites from Kish v. Taylor (1912 Appeal Cases page 604, at page 617) it seems to me from the sentence which immediately follows it as from the actual decision in the case and the whole tenor of Lord Atkinson's speech itself that the word "will" was intended to be "may".

What the learned judge had to do in the present case as in any other case where one party to a contract relies upon a breach by the other party as giving him a right to elect to rescind the contract, was to look at the events which had occurred as a result of the breach at the time at which the charterers purported to rescind the charter-party and to decide whether the occurrence of those events deprived the charterers of substantially the whole benefit which it was the intention of the parties as expressed in the charter-party that the charterers should obtain from the further performance of their own contractual undertakings.

One turns therefore to the contract, the Baltime 1939 Charter, of which Lord Justice Sellers has already cited the relevant terms. Clause 13, the "due diligence" clause, which exempts the shipowners from responsibility for delay or loss or damage to goods on board due to unseaworthiness unless such delay or loss or damage has been caused by want of due diligence of the owners in making the vessel seaworthy and fitted for the voyage, is in itself sufficient to show that the mere occurrence of the events that the vessel was in some respect unseaworthy when tendered or that such unseaworthiness had caused some delay in performance of the charter-party would not deprive the charterer of the whole benefit which it was the intention of the parties he should obtain from the performance of his obligations under the contract - for he undertakes to continue to perform his obligations notwithstanding the occurrence of such events if they fall short of frustration of the contract and even deprives himself of any remedy in damages unless such events are the consequence of want of due diligence on the part of the shipowner.

The question which the learned judge had to ask himself was, as he rightly decided, whether or not at the date when the charterers purported to rescind the contract, namely 6th June, 1957, or when the shipowners purported to accept such rescission, namely 8th August, 1957, the delay which had already occurred as a result of the incompetence of the engine room staff, and the delay which was likely to occur in repairing the engines of the vessel and the conduct of the shipowners "by that date in taking steps to remedy these two matters, were, when taken together, such as to deprive the charterers of substantially the whole benefit which it was the intention of the parties they should obtain from further use of the vessel under the charter-party.

In my view, in his judgment - on which I would not seek to improve - the learned judge took into account and gave due weight to all the relevant considerations and arrived at the right answer for the right reasons.

== Significance ==
Both under the common law and under the Hague-Visby Rules, the term "seaworthiness" covers not just the ship itself, but its crew, its provisions and equipment, and its suitability for both the cargo and the voyage. The Hong Kong Fir confirmed that the term "seaworthiness" has a very broad meaning ranging from trivial defects like a missing life preserver or a major flaw that would sink the ship. Accordingly, it is impossible to determine ahead of time what type of term it is. Thus, the type of breach must be determined by the judges. "Seaworthiness" is defined both by common law and by statute. In McFadden v Blue Star Lines [1905] 1 KB 607 it was stated that, to be seaworthy, a vessel must have the degree of fitness that an ordinarily careful and prudent shipowner would require his vessel to have at the commencement of a voyage, having regard to all possible circumstances. And the Marine Insurance Act 1906 s 39(4) provides that "a ship is deemed to be seaworthy when she is reasonably fit in all respects to encounter the ordinary perils of the adventure insured."

In the Hong Kong case, the issue was not whether the unseaworthiness was "serious" or "minor"; rather the question was whether the undoubtedly serious unseaworthiness had had an effect sufficiently grave to allow the charterer to repudiate. On the facts, given that the charterer had had the "substantial benefit" of the contract for some 80% of the time period, the court held that the breach was adequately remedied by damages.

The Hong Kong Fir decision was met with some alarm in the shipping world, where certainty is crucial. The problem was the delay element; one had to "wait and see" the effect of the breach. The enormous costs involved in chartering mean that parties cannot afford to leisurely loiter, whilst pondering the consequences of the breach. Soon after, in The Mihalis Angelos [1971] 1 QB 164, it was held the impossibility of the shipowner to meet the "expected ready to load" date, ipso facto entitled the charterer to repudiate for anticipatory breach of condition.

== See also ==
- Maredelanto Compania Naviera SA v Bergbau-Handel GmbH [1971] 1 QB 164
- Bunge Corporation v Tradax SA [1981] 2 All ER 513
- L Schuler AG v Wickman Machine Tool Sales Ltd [1974] AC 235
- Golden Strait Corporation v Nippon Yusen Kubishka Kaisha [2007] UKHL 12
- Jackson v Union Marine Insurance Co Ltd (1874) LR 10 CP 125
