= Maredelanto Compania Naviera SA v Bergbau-Handel GmbH =

English legal case

The Mihalis Angelos
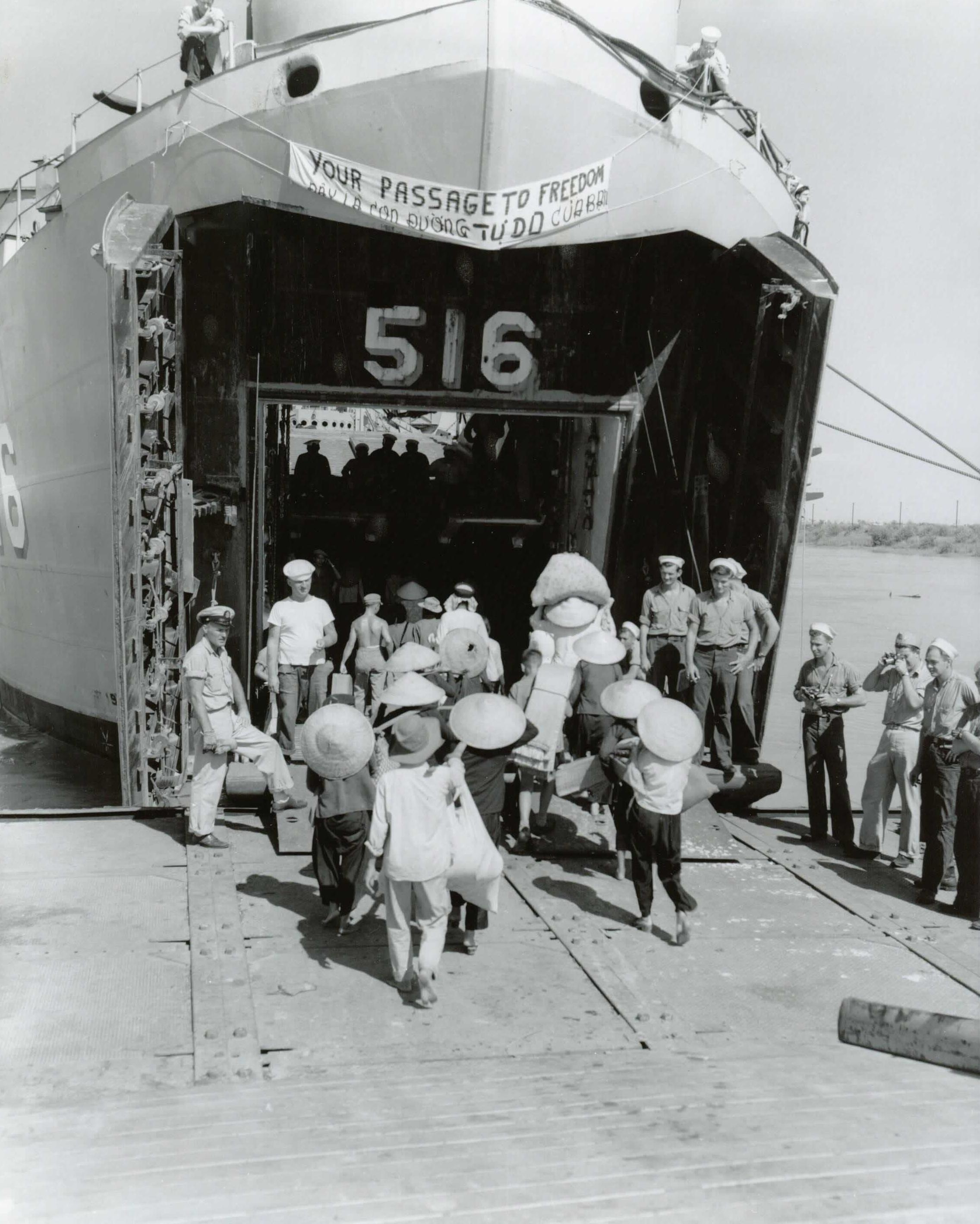
- Court: Court of Appeal
- Citations: [1970] EWCA Civ 4, [1971] 1 QB 164

Case opinions
- Lord Denning MR, Edmund Davies LJ and Megaw LJ

Maredelanto Compania Naviera SA v Bergbau-Handel GmbH or The Mihalis Angelos [1970] EWCA Civ 4 is an English contract law case, concerning breach of contract.

== Facts ==
The Mihalis Angelos was fixed to sail to Haiphong and there load a cargo for delivery in Europe. In the charterparty dated 25 May 1965 the shipowners ("the owners") stated that the ship was "expected ready to load under this charter about July 1, 1965". The charterparty also provided, in the first sentence of the cancelling clause,

"Should the vessel not be ready to load (whether in berth or not) on or before July 20, 1965, charterers have the option of cancelling this contract, such option to be declared, if demanded, at least 48 hours before vessel's expected arrival at port of loading".

On 17 July 1965 the ship was at Hong Kong, still discharging cargo from her previous voyage. It was physically impossible for her to finish discharging and reach Haiphong by 20 July. The charterers gave notice cancelling the charter. The owners treated this as a repudiation and claimed damages, which were the subject of arbitration and of an appeal to Mocatta J. On further appeal, there were three issues:

- Was the "expected readiness" clause was a condition of which the owners were in breach, entitling the charterers to terminate the charter contract?
- If so, had the charterers properly repudiated the contract by cancelling on 17 July, three days before the specified 20 July deadline?
- Was the damage suffered by the owners (on the assumption that the charterers' premature cancellation had been a repudiation) to be considered?

== Judgment ==
On the first issue, all three members of the court decided in favour of the charterers, Bergbau, and against the owners, Maredelanto, that 'expected ready' was a condition of the contract. On the second issue, Lord Denning held that the charterers had not repudiated the contract by cancelling on 17 July, but Edmund Davies LJ and Megaw LJ held that they had. On the third issue, Lord Denning, in agreement with the arbitrators, who were themselves agreed, held that they had suffered no damage (p 197): "Seeing that the charterers would, beyond doubt, have cancelled, I am clearly of opinion that the shipowners suffered no loss: and would be entitled at most to nominal damages."

Edmund Davies LJ agreed (p 202): "One must look at the contract as a whole, and if it is clear that the innocent party has lost nothing, he should recover no more than nominal damages for the loss of his right to have the whole contract completed."

Megaw LJ (at pp 209–210) stated:

In my view, where there is an anticipatory breach of contract, the breach is the repudiation once it has been accepted, and the other party is entitled to recover by way of damages the true value of the contractual rights which he has thereby lost; subject to his duty to mitigate. If the contractual rights which he has lost were capable by the terms of the contract of being rendered either less valuable or valueless in certain events, and if it can be shown that those events were, at the date of acceptance of the repudiation, predestined to happen, then in my view the damages which he can recover are not more than the true value, if any, of the rights which he has lost, having regard to those predestined events.

All members of the court were viewing the case as from the date of acceptance of the repudiation (although only Megaw LJ said so in terms). They were not taking account of later events. They were recognising, as was obvious on the facts as found, that the value of the contractual right which the owners had lost, as of the date of acceptance of the repudiation, was nil because the charter was bound to be lawfully cancelled three days later.

== Significance ==
The 1962 case of Hong Kong Fir Shipping Co Ltd v Kawasaki Kisen Kaisha had helped to clarify the distinction between breach of "condition" (where both damages and repudiation lie) and breach of "warranty" (whose sole remedy is damages). The court declared that the victim of a breach of contract could lawfully repudiate only if the "breach had denied the plaintiff of the main benefit of the contract". Here, even though the vessel's unseaworthiness (through insufficient and incompetent crew) might seem important, its effect was only minor. The problem with the Hong Kong Fir case, from the viewpoint of the shipping trade, was the "wait and see" principle. That is, one had to "wait and see" whether the breach had indeed "denied the plaintiff of the main benefit". Given the huge daily cost of hiring and running a ship, parties could not afford to wait. The shipping trade welcomed the Mihalis Angelos decision, as it effectively established a new commercial convention that certain breaches such as breach of an "Expected Readiness to Load" clause (a type of NOR) were inherently repudiatory, with no need to "wait and see".

== See also ==
- Bunge Corporation v Tradax SA [1981] 2 All ER 513
- L Schuler AG v Wickman Machine Tool Sales Ltd [1974] AC 235
- Golden Strait Corporation v Nippon Yusen Kubishka Kaisha [2007] UKHL 12
