= Golden Strait Corp v Nippon Yusen Kubishka Kaisha =

The Golden Victory
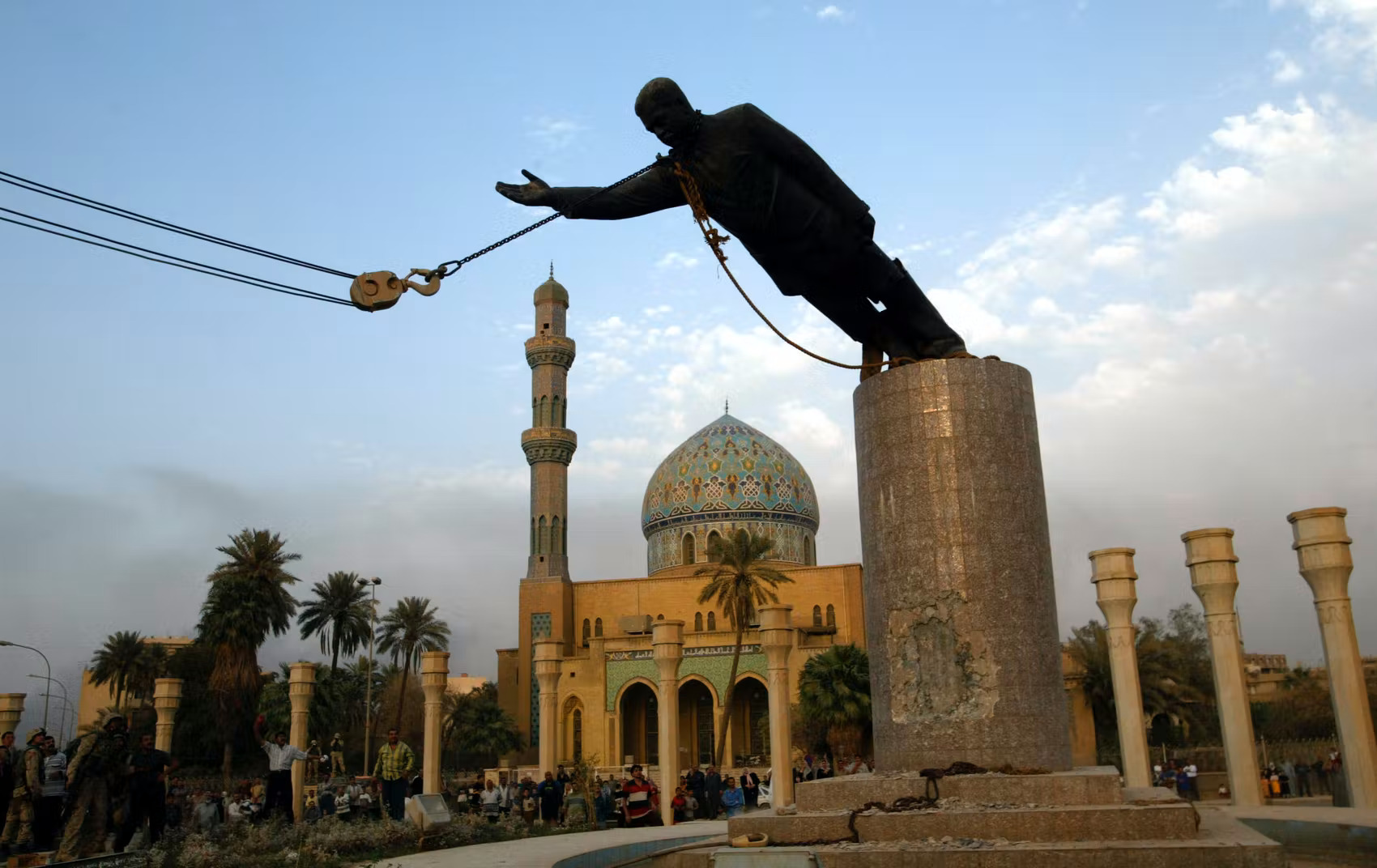
- The Iraq War in 2003 cancelled the contract between the parties.
- Court: House of Lords
- Decided: 28 March 2007
- Citations: [2007] UKHL 12 [2007] 2 AC 353

Case history
- Prior actions: Golden Strait Corporation v Kaisha [2005] EWCA Civ 1190 (18 October 2005)), affirming Golden Strait Corporation v Nippon Yusen Kubishika Kaisha "The Golden Victory" [2005] EWHC 161 (Comm) (15 February 2005)

Court membership
- Judges sitting: Lord Bingham of Cornhill; Lord Scott of Foscote; Lord Walker of Gestingthorpe; Lord Carswell; Lord Brown of Eaton-under-Heywood

Case opinions
- Damages should represent the value of the contractual benefits of which the claimant had been deprived by the breach of contract.
- Decision by: Lord Scott
- Concurrence: Lords Carswell and Brown
- Dissent: Lords Bingham and Walker

Keywords
- damages; breach of contract

Golden Strait Corporation v Nippon Yusen Kubishika Kaisha [2007] UKHL 12, also known as The Golden Victory, is an English contract law case, concerning the measure of damages for breach of contract.

== Facts ==
Golden Strait Corp chartered a ship to Nippon Yusen Kubishika Kaisha or "NYK Line" from 10 July 1998. The earliest contractual date for termination was 6 December 2005. The only exception (in clause 33 of the charterparty) for cancellation was if war broke out between Iraq, the United States, the United Kingdom and a number of others. NYK Line, nevertheless repudiated the charter on 14 December 2001, redelivering the ship to Golden. Golden accepted this three days after.

They took the case to an arbitrator to consider how much NYK Line should pay in damages. By that time, America had started the Iraq War, in March 2003. This was just the event that would have allowed NYK Line to cancel the charter, if stayed with it.

The arbitrator, Mr Robert Gaisford, reluctantly decided that the outbreak of war had created a limit on the payable damages. NYK Line was liable for no damages after 21 March 2003. Golden appealed, the question being, in what circumstances could a party in breach rely on subsequent events to show that the contractual rights lost were not valuable?

Golden argued that where there was an available market, the loss should be measured at the date of acceptance of breach. It said that this created finality in contractual negotiations, and certainty because events subsequent to the date of acceptance of a contractual breach would become irrelevant.

== Judgment ==
Three members of the House of Lords upheld the decision of the Court of Appeal, while Lord Bingham and Lord Walker dissented.

The majority held that because the outbreak of war occurred before the damages fell to be assessed, they could be taken into account. The most important thing was an accurate assessment of damages based on the loss actually incurred, which goes to the root of the compensatory principles that a victim of breach of contract will be compensated for the loss of his bargain. The victim should be placed in the position as if the contract were performed. The court should not ignore facts that were available. Golden was trying to argue for compensation exceeding the value of what it had lost.

Lord Bingham, dissenting, would have held that damages should be assessed on the date of the breach. That should have meant Golden got damages for four years left on the charterparty. He emphasised the importance of certainty and predictability in English commercial law and said this decision would hurt it.

22 The thrust of the charterers' argument was that the owners would be unfairly over-compensated if they were to recover as damages sums which, with the benefit of hindsight, it is now known that they would not have received had there been no accepted repudiation by the charterers. There are, in my opinion, several answers to this. The first is that contracts are made to be performed, not broken. It may prove disadvantageous to break a contract instead of performing it. The second is that if, on their repudiation being accepted, the charterers had promptly honoured their secondary obligation to pay damages, the transaction would have been settled well before the Second Gulf War became a reality. The third is that the owners were, as the arbitrator held (see para 7 above), entitled to be compensated for the value of what they had lost on the date it was lost, and it could not be doubted that what the owners lost at that date was a charterparty with slightly less than four years to run. This was a clear and, in my opinion, crucial finding, but it was not mentioned in either of the judgments below, nor is it mentioned by any of my noble and learned friends in the majority. On the arbitrator's finding, it was marketable on that basis. I can readily accept that the value of a contract in the market may be reduced if terminable on an event which the market judges to be likely but not certain, but that was not what the arbitrator found to be the fact in this case. There is, with respect to those who think otherwise, nothing artificial in this approach. If a party is compensated for the value of what he has lost at the time when he loses it, and its value is at that time for any reason depressed, he is fairly compensated. That does not cease to be so because adventitious later events reveal that the market at that time was depressed by the apprehension of risks that did not eventuate. A party is not, after all, obliged to accept a repudiation: he can, if he chooses, keep the contract alive, for better or worse. By describing the prospect of war in December 2001 as "merely a possibility", the expression twice used by the arbitrator in paragraph 59 of his reasons, the arbitrator can only have meant that it was seen as an outside chance, not affecting the marketable value of the charter at that time.

23 There is, however, a further answer which I, in common with the arbitrator, consider to be of great importance. He acknowledged the force of arguments advanced by the owners based on certainty ("generally important in commercial affairs"), finality ("the alternative being a running assessment of the state of play so far as the likelihood of some interruption to the contract is concerned"), settlement ("otherwise the position will remain fluid"), consistency ("the idea that a party's accrued rights can be changed by subsequent events is objectionable in principle") and coherence ("the date of repudiation is the date on which rights and damages are assessed"). The judge was not greatly impressed by the charterers' argument along these lines, observing (paras 13, 35) that although certainty is a real and beneficial target, it is not easily achieved, and the charterparty contained within it the commercial uncertainty of the war clause. Lord Mance similarly said (para 24):

"Certainty, finality and ease of settlement are all of course important general considerations. But the element of uncertainty, resulting from the war clause, meant that the owners were never entitled to absolute confidence that the charter would run for its full seven-year period. They never had an asset which they could bank or sell on that basis. There is no reason why the transmutation of their claims to performance of the charter into claims for damages for non-performance of the charter should improve their position in this respect."

I cannot, with respect, accept this reasoning. The importance of certainty and predictability in commercial transactions has been a constant theme of English commercial law at any rate since the judgment of Lord Mansfield CJ in Vallejo v Wheeler (1774) 1 Cowp 143, 153, and has been strongly asserted in recent years in cases such as Scandinavian Trading Tanker Co AB v Flota Petrolera Ecuatoriana (The Scaptrade) [1983] QB 529, 540-541, [1983] 2 AC 694, 703-704; Homburg Houtimport BV v Agrosin Private Ltd [2003] UKHL 12, [2004] 1 AC 715, 738; Jindal Iron and Steel Co Ltd v Islamic Solidarity Shipping Co Jordan Inc (The Jordan II) [2004] UKHL 49, [2005] 1 WLR 1363, 1370. Professor Sir Guenter Treitel QC read the Court of Appeal's judgment as appearing to impair this quality of certainty ("Assessment of Damages for Wrongful Repudiation", (2007) 123 LQR 9-18) and I respectfully share his concern.

Lord Walker dissented with Lord Bingham.

== Impact and controversy ==
The decision attracted considerable discussion among jurists and academics, with one former judge of the Commercial Court declaring that it was "‘the worst decision on any aspect of English commercial law, and certainly shipping law, that has come out of the House of Lords in my entire career in the legal profession..." Academics have raised several concerns about the majority decision, stating that it damages the certainty which is one of the major advantages of English commercial law, and it encourages the breaching party to delay settlement or prolong litigation. However, it has also been pointed out that the majority decision also reinforces the risk allocation function of contract, and the rule stated in it is both socially desirable and it provides an incentive to inform the other party as early as possible of their intention to breach, thus creating a more efficient outcome from a game theory perspective.

The United Kingdom Supreme Court upheld the principle of The Golden Victory in a unanimous decision in 2015, holding that it applied to one-off contracts, in addition to the instalment contracts that were at issue in the earlier ruling.

== See also ==
In contract

- Hong Kong Fir Shipping Co Ltd v Kawasaki Kisen Kaisha [1962] 2 QB 26
- Maredelanto Compania Naviera SA v Bergbau-Handel GmbH [1971] 1 QB 164
- Bunge Corporation v Tradax SA [1981] 2 All ER 513
- L Schuler AG v Wickman Machine Tool Sales Ltd [1974] AC 235
- Bunge SA v Nidera BV [2015] UKSC 43

In tort

- Baker v Willoughby [1969] 3 All ER 1528
