= C&P =

C&P may refer to:

- C&P Telephone or Chesapeake and Potomac Telephone Company
- Cumberland and Pennsylvania Railroad, a former American railroad that operated in Western Maryland

== See also ==
- C&P Haulage v Middleton, a 1983 English contract law case
- CP (disambiguation)
