= Innominate term =

In English contract law, an innominate term is an intermediate term which cannot be defined as either a "condition" or a "warranty".

In Hong Kong Fir Shipping Co Ltd v Kawasaki Kisen Kaisha Ltd (1962 2 QB 26) the Court of Appeal of England and Wales first conceived the notion of an "innominate term". This was followed in the case of The Mihalis Angelos (1971 1 QB 174).

== Importance ==
The classification of terms is fundamental in contract law as it affects the legal rights of a party in the event of a breach of contract. Innominate terms of contracts are one of the three categories of terms of contract, the others being warranties and conditions.

The creation of this innominate category of terms (also known as "intermediate") is associated with the analysis of Diplock LJ in the case Hong Kong Fir Shipping Co Ltd v Kawasaki Kisen Kaisha Ltd (1962), and is credited with the introduction of innominate terms in Hong Kong Fir.

The judge does not however refer to this type of term as "innominate" or "intermediate" anywhere in the judgment. The word "innominate" was coined in Stephenson LJ in Wickman Machine Tool Sales Ltd v L Schuler A.G. [1972] 1 WLR 840.

It is the legal principle and reasoning in Hong Kong Fir which gives the case its fundamental importance in contract law, rather than facts of the case. The background of the facts is of little relative importance. The case is that it establishes the legal test applied to decide whether a party to a contract is in repudiatory breach of contract, or not. That significance of that test is that when a party is in repudiatory breach of a contract, the innocent party is entitled to terminate the contract.

== Origins ==
In Bremer Handelsgesellschaft Schaft m.b.h. v Vanden Avenne Izegem p.v.b.a. [1978] 2 Lloyd's Rep 109 at p. 113 Lord Wilberforce spoke of the consequences of a breach of an "innominate term" hinged on the "nature and gravity" of the breach.

Since Bunge v Tradax in the House of Lords, the description "innominate term" has been in regular use. Lord Scarman's speech in that case concisely describes the differences between conditions, warranties and innominate terms.

The treatment of innominate terms in the modern law of contract was set out by Diplock LJ in Hong Kong Fir Shipping Co. Ltd. v Kawasaki Kisen Kaisha Ltd. [1962] 2 QB 26 in the following passage at pages 69–70:

69. No doubt there are many simple contractual undertakings, sometimes express but more often because of their very simplicity ('It goes without saying') to be implied, of which it can be predicated that every breach of such an undertaking must give rise to an event which will deprive the party not in default of substantially the whole benefit which it was intended that he should obtain from the contact. And such a stipulation, unless the parties have agreed that breach of it shall not entitle the non-defaulting party to treat the contract as repudiated, is a 'condition'. So too there may be other simple contractual undertakings of which it can be predicated that no breach can give rise to an event which will deprive the party not in default of substantially the whole benefit which it was intended that he should obtain from the contract; and such a stipulation, unless the parties have agreed that breach of it shall entitle the non-defaulting party to treat the contract as repudiated, is a 'warranty'.
70 There are, however, many contractual undertakings of a more complex character which cannot be categorised as being 'conditions' or 'warranties'….. Of such undertakings all that can be predicated is that some breaches will and others will not give rise to an event which will deprive the party not in default of substantially the whole benefit which it was intended that he should obtain from the contract; and the legal consequences of a breach of such an undertaking, unless provided for expressly in the contract, depend upon the nature of the event to which the breach gives rise and do not follow automatically from a prior classification of the undertaking as a 'condition' or a 'warranty'…

Twenty years later, the then leading contract law judge in England, Lord Wilberforce said in the third paragraph of his judgment in Bunge v Tradax:

"In Hong Kong Fir Diplock LJ […] in his seminal judgment illuminated the existence in contracts of terms which were neither, necessarily, conditions nor warranties, but, in terminology which has since been applied to them, intermediate or innominate terms capable of operating, according to the gravity of the breach, as either conditions or warranties."

The test pronounced by Diplock LJ in Hong Kong Fir remains the law in England and Wales.

== The test for repudiatory breach (of an innominate term) ==
The test applied in the case to decide whether there was repudiatory breach of an innominate term was:

"does the occurrence of [an] event [which breaches the contract] deprive the [innocent] party of substantially the whole benefit [of] the contract that he should obtain [under the contract]?"

The focus of the test is the consequence of the obligation to perform under the contract – not the act of the breach itself. Where the event occurs as a result of a breach of contract, the party in breach cannot rely upon it to relieve themselves of performance of any further undertakings. But the innocent party may, if the innocent party elects to terminate.

In the case, Diplock LJ set out that test for repudiatory breach and made it clear that the application of the test depended on the judge's evaluation of all the relevant circumstances.

"Wait and See" Terms

For this reason, innominate terms could be called "wait and see" terms of contracts – one needs to wait and see the consequence of the breach to ascertain whether the initial act which was a breach of the contract was sufficiently serious to amount to a repudiatory breach of contract. If the consequences are sufficiently serious so as to deprive the innocent party of "substantially the whole benefit of the contract", it's a repudiatory breach of contract.

Breach of an innominate term therefore depends entirely upon the nature of the breach and its foreseeable consequences.

For Upjohn LJ in Hong Kong Fir, the question of law was:

"Does the breach of the stipulation go so much to the root of the contract that it makes further commercial performance of the contract impossible, or in other words is the whole contract frustrated? If yea, the innocent party may treat the contract as at an end. If nay, his claim sounds in damages only."

The words "does the breach […] go to the root of the contract" and "deprive the innocent party of substantially the whole benefit of the contract" are really saying the same thing.

== Warranty, condition, or innominate term? ==
The modern English law approach to the classification of contractual terms is that a term is innominate unless it is clear that it is intended to be a condition or a warranty

As Lord Scarman stated in Bunge v Tradax:

"Unless the contract makes it clear, either by express provision or by necessary implication arising from its nature, purpose, and circumstances…. that a particular stipulation is a condition or only a warranty, it is an innominate term, the remedy for a breach of which depends upon the nature, consequences, and effect of the breach."

Likewise with Lord Wilberforce in Bunge v Tradax

"But I do not doubt that, in suitable cases, the courts should not be reluctant, if the intentions of the parties as shown by the contract so indicate, to hold that an obligation has the force of a condition, and that indeed they should usually do so in the case of time clauses in mercantile contracts."

== Summary of the facts of Hong Kong Fir ==
The charterparty in Hong Kong Fir Shipping Co. Ltd. v Kawasaki Kisen Kaisha Ltd was a time charter of 24 months (the shipowner manages the vessel but the charterer gives orders for the employment of the vessel). The vessel was delivered to the charterers on 13 February 1957. The charter used the ship to carry coal from Virginia in the United States to Osaka, Japan. The ship's age meant that it needed to be maintained by skilled and experienced engine room staff en route to Osaka. The chief engineer was an alcoholic. The engine room staff were inadequate in number. Due to a series of breakdowns and the cost of repairs required to be made while sailing from Liverpool to Osaka the charterers purported to terminate the charter. The grounds relied on by the charterers (ie the hirers of the ship) to attempt to terminate included breaches of obligations of the shipowners to: (1) deliver a seaworthy vessel; (2) maintain the vessel properly; and (3) deliver a ship capable of a specified minimum speed. The charterers also said that they were entitled to terminate the charter because of the failures by the shipowners to remedy breaches (a) within a reasonable time, and/or (b) so as to frustrate the purpose of the charter.

The point of the case for the purposes of legal authority is that although the ship was delayed at various ports due to the incompetence of its crew and the defects in the ship, the charterers were found not to be justified in terminating the charter. The ship eventually arrived (though late). The repairs which the charterers paid for could be compensated by an award of damages. The Court found upon consideration of all the circumstances that they were "not deprived of substantially the whole of the benefit of the charter". The breaches did not go to the root of the contract - they weren't serious enough. Accordingly, the charterers were not entitled to terminate the contract.

== See also ==
- Inchoate offence
- Quasi-contract
- Quasi-tort
