= Bunge SA v Nidera BV =

2015 UK Supreme Court decision

- Court: Supreme Court of the United Kingdom
- Full case name: Bunge SA v Nidera BV (formerly known as Nidera Handelscompagnie BV)
- Argued: 27–29 April 2015
- Decided: 1 July 2015
- Neutral citation: [2015] UKSC 43

Case history
- Prior history: Bunge SA v Nidera BV [2013] EWCA Civ 1628, [2014] 1 Lloyd's Rep 404 (12 December 2013), affirming Bunge SA v Nidera BV [2013] EWHC 84 (Comm), [2013] 1 Lloyd's Rep 621 (29 January 2013)

Holding
- The Golden Victory applies to both instalment contracts and one-off sale contracts and there is no logical reasoning for distinguishing the two. The fundamental principle for the assessment of damages in cases of breach of contract is, within the limits set out in Hadley v Baxendale, to put the parties in their position had the contract been performed.

Case opinions
- Majority: Lord Sumption (with whom Lord Neuberger, Lord Mance and Lord Clarke agree); Lord Toulson (with whom Lord Neuberger, Lord Mance and Lord Clarke agree)

Area of law
- contract law, sale of goods, repudiation, measure of damages

Bunge SA v Nidera BV [2015] UKSC 43 is a landmark decision of the United Kingdom Supreme Court in the area of commercial law, providing guidance on the assessment of damages arising out of a wrongful repudiation of a contract for the sale of goods.

== Facts ==
The parties entered into a contract for the supply of 25,000 metric tonnes of Russian milling wheat, which was to be shipped in the latter part of August 2010. It incorporated GAFTA Form 49, which provided procedures for termination and default damages.

When Russia introduced a legislative embargo on exports of wheat from its territory (which ran from 15 August to 31 December 2010), Bunge (the "Seller") (Note: a subsidiary of Bunge Limited) notified the Buyer of the embargo and purported to declare the contract cancelled. Nidera (the "Buyer") (Note: a subsidiary of COFCO International Limited, controlled by Temasek Holdings) did not accept that the Seller was entitled to cancel the contract and treated the purported cancellation as a repudiation, which it accepted on 11 August 2010. The following day the Seller offered to reinstate the contract on the same terms, but the Buyer would not agree. Instead, it began arbitration proceedings under the GAFTA rules in support of a claim for damages of US$3,062,500.

GAFTA's first-tier tribunal held that the contract had been repudiated, and its ruling was upheld by the GAFTA Appeal Panel, which awarded the Buyer its claim in full. The ruling was subsequently upheld by the Commercial Court and the Court of Appeal of England and Wales.

== Judgment ==
The Supreme Court found in favour of the Seller, reversing all of the lower tribunals, and awarded the Buyer nominal damages of only US$5. In his ruling, Lord Sumption succinctly expressed the relevant principle in assessing damages:

Commercial certainty is undoubtedly important, although its significance will inevitably vary from one contract to another. But it can rarely be thought to justify an award of substantial damages to someone who has not suffered any.

In that regard, he held that:

1. Damages clauses, such as the one incorporated in GAFTA 49, are not to be regarded as complete codes for the assessment of damage. It did not address the effect of subsequent events that would have resulted in the original contract not being performed in any event, nor did it exclude every other consideration that may be relevant to determine the innocent party's actual loss. In those circumstances, common law principles on recoverable damages would continue to apply.
2. While damages clauses may prescribe a fixed measure of loss that differs from the measure of damages recoverable at common law, in the absence of clear words, a court will not conclude that a damages clause was intended to operate arbitrarily and produce a result unrelated to anything that the parties can reasonably have expected to approximate to the true loss.
3. A construction of the default clause that would place the Buyers in a financially far better position than if the breach had not occurred was most unlikely to have been intended by those drafting the clause. It was far more likely that the clause was intended to apply to the usual situation of a non-delivery or non-acceptance of goods for which there was an available market, rather than a situation where the contract would not have been performed due to supervening events leading to its inevitable cancellation.
4. The Golden Victory cannot be distinguished from the present case. The principle that damages should be compensatory applied equally to a contract for a one-off sale and an instalment contract.

== Significance ==
The Golden Victory, when it was handed down, attracted considerable discussion among jurists and academics, with one former judge of the Commercial Court declaring that it was "‘the worst decision on any aspect of English commercial law, and certainly shipping law, that has come out of the House of Lords in my entire career in the legal profession..." Academics raised several concerns about the majority decision, stating that it damages the certainty which is one of the major advantages of English commercial law, and it encourages the breaching party to delay settlement or prolong litigation. However, it has also been pointed out that the majority decision also reinforced the risk allocation function of contract, and the rule stated in it is both socially desirable and it provides an incentive to inform the other party as early as possible of their intention to breach, thus creating a more efficient outcome from a game theory perspective. Bunge has resolved the uncertainty that had arisen from this ruling.

As GAFTA 49 is a standard form that is widely used in commodities transactions, Bunge is expected to have broad consequences. Most commentators point out that clear and express words will need to be incorporated into such contracts to oust the common law principles involved, which will make the relevant clauses more complex.
