= Baker v Willoughby =

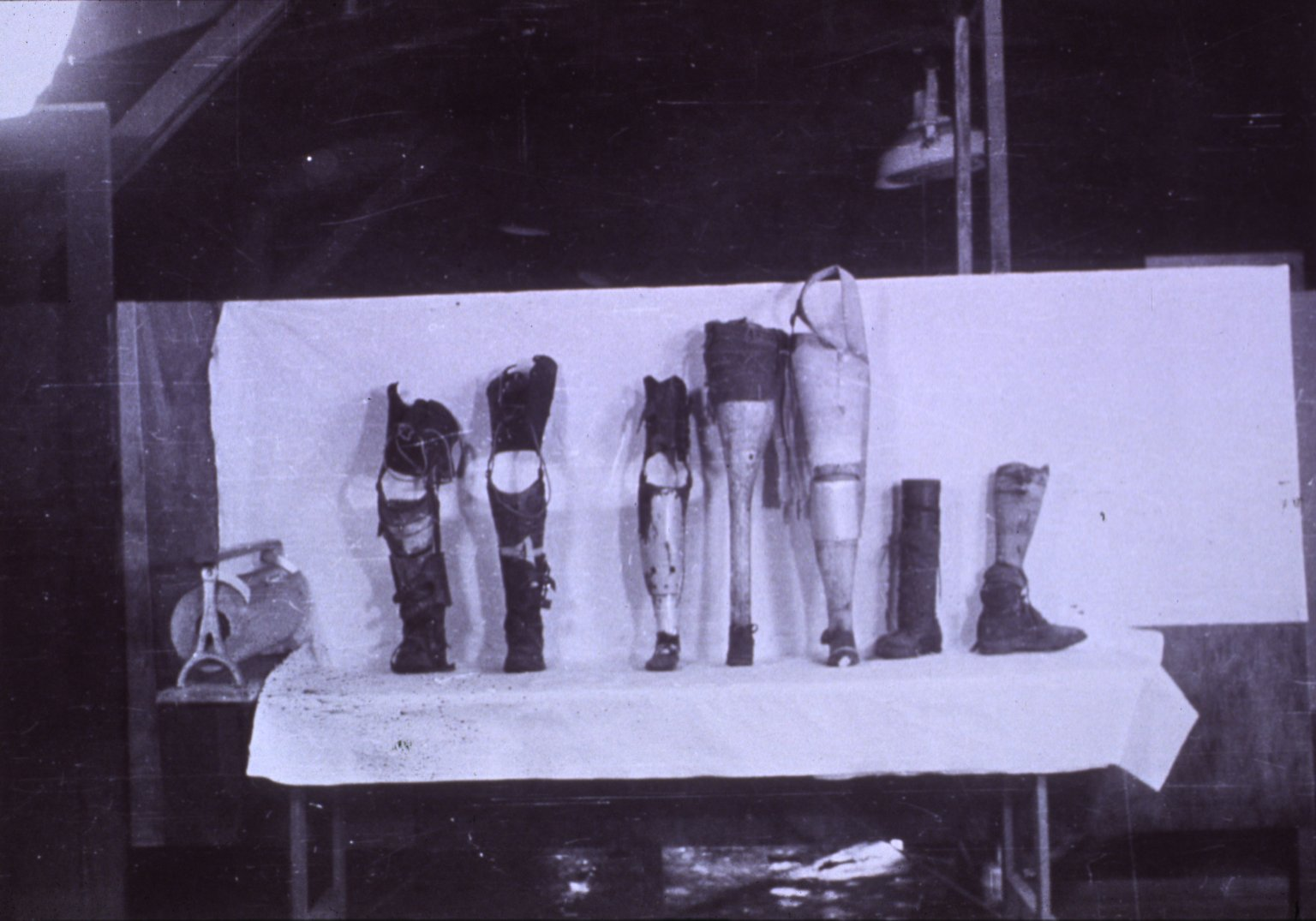
- Court: House of Lords
- Decided: 1969
- Citations: [1969] UKHL 8 [1969] 3 All ER 1528

Court membership
- Judges sitting: Lord Reid, Lord Guest, Viscount Dilhorne, Lord Donovan, Lord Pearson

Keywords
- Personal injury, novus actus interveniens

Baker v Willoughby [1969] UKHL 8 was a Judicial Committee of the House of Lords case decision on causation in the law of torts, notable for its idiosyncratic facts. The case is concerned with the question of "breaking the chain of causation", or novus actus interveniens.

== Facts ==
Mr Baker (the plaintiff) was knocked down by the defendant's car, leaving him with a stiff ankle of his left leg and reduced mobility and income. After the accident but before the trial, Mr Baker was shot by a robber in his injured leg and the leg had to be amputated.

The defendant argued that the injuries he had caused to Mr Baker were obviated by the later accident. His argument was based on causation: the shooting was an intervening event, which was not caused by his negligent driving and the amputation of the man's leg meant that the defendant could not be held accountable for any loss, since the damage he had done previously no longer existed.

== Judgment ==
The House of Lords has unanimously rejected this argument. Lord Pearson held although this argument seemed to make logical sense, it would produce a "manifest injustice" if it were allowed to succeed. Lord Reid considered that the damage caused by the defendant, the plaintiff's inability to run, his reduced working capacities etc. were not obviated by the shooter's act. Furthermore, if the shooter (who could not be found), were to be held liable, he would only have to pay the losses he caused Mr Baker by the shooting, not by the earlier car accident (because of the rule that "the defendant must take the plaintiff as he finds him"). Consequently, Mr Baker would remain under compensated.

== Significance ==
The correctness of this judgment and its value as precedent was questioned by the House of Lords in Jobling v Associated Dairies Ltd (1981) which centred on a medical condition unrelated to the personal injury developed three years later, spondylotic myelopathy, which affected the claimant's neck and outweighed any future damages in the reasoning of the court.

== See also ==
- Causation
- Breaking the chain
- The Golden Victory [2007] UKHL 12
- Target Holdings Ltd v Redferns [1996] AC 421
- Saamco v York Montague Ltd
