= Jobling v Associated Dairies Ltd =

- Court: House of Lords
- Citation: [1982] AC 794

Jobling v Associated Dairies Ltd [1982] AC 794 is an English tort law case, concerning causation, and whether damages are recoverable if a second accident harms a claimant so as to submerge a first.

== Facts ==
The claimant suffered a back injury at work resulting from their employer's breach of duty. Then, unrelated, the claimant also suffered a spinal disease, myelopathy, and could not work anyway. The employer argued they should not have to pay compensation for the back injury, since Jobling would have been unable to work in any case.

The Court of Appeal held the defendant was not liable for plaintiff's loss of earning after he contracted the spinal disease.

== Judgment ==
The House of Lords held that Associated Dairies was not liable for damages after the spinal disease, because this was part of the ‘vicissitudes of life’. Lord Wilberforce said Lord Reid's theory of concurrent causes in Baker v Willoughby was unworkable, and continued:

We live in a mixed world where a man is protected against injury and misfortune by a whole web of rules and dispositions, with a number of timid legislative interventions....

[There was...] no justification for disregarding the fact that the injured man’s employer is insured ... against liability to his employees. The state has decided, in other words, on a spreading of risk...

[So long as...] we are content to live in a mansion of so many different architectures this is inevitable.

Lord Russell said the claims ‘do not persuade me that we are led by Baker to take a further step.’ Lord Keith also criticised Baker. Lord Bridge said Baker was unsustainable.

== See also ==
- English tort law
