= Nettleship v Weston =

English legal case about negligence

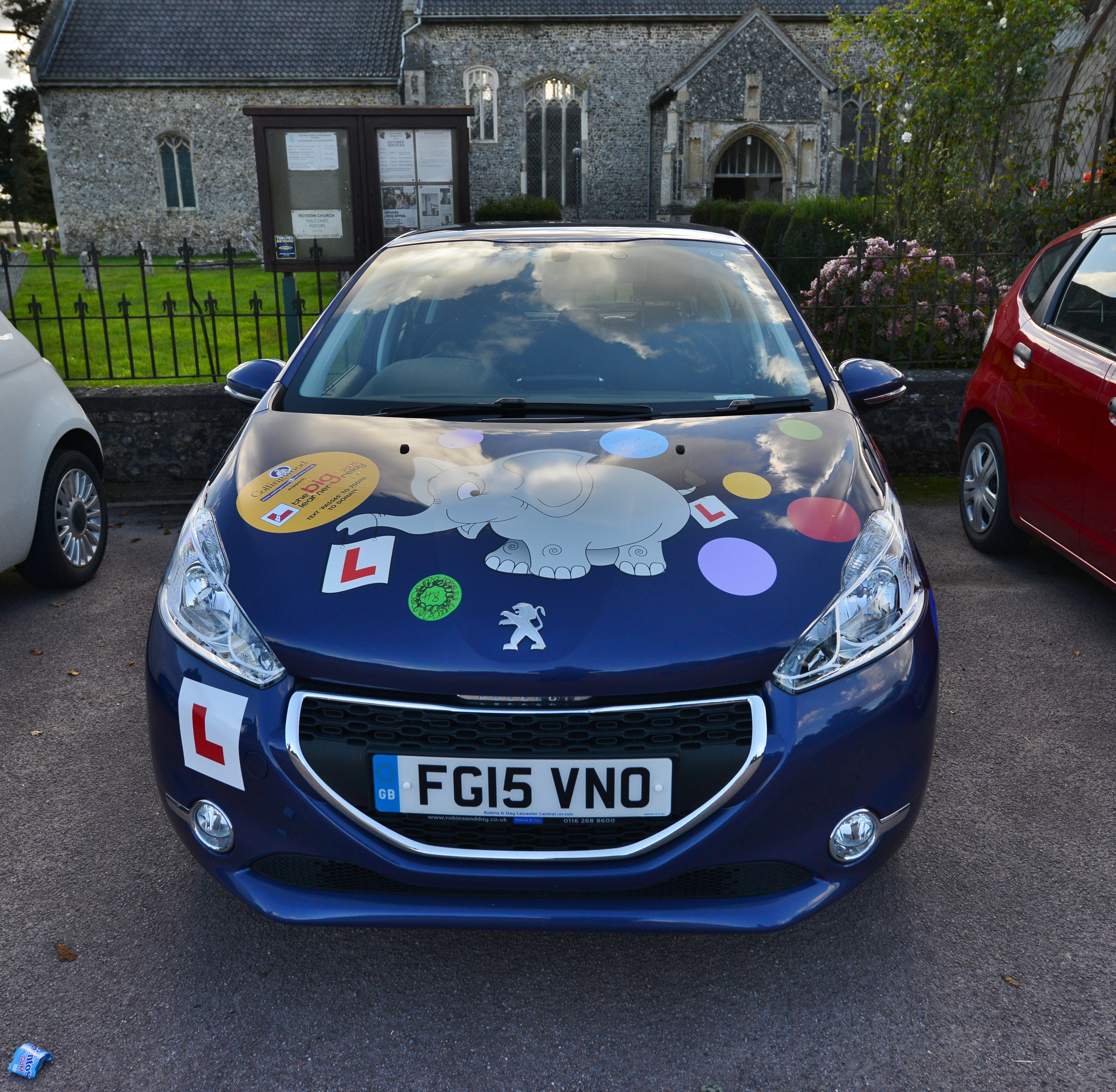
- Student drivers such as the defendant are required to hang an L-plate when driving.
- Court: Court of Appeal
- Full case name: Eric Nettleship v Lavinia Weston (Married woman)
- Decided: 30 June 1971
- Citations: [1971] EWCA Civ 6, [1971] 2 QB 691, [1971] 3 WLR 370, [1971] 3 All ER 581, [1971] RTR 425
- Legislation cited: Civil Evidence Act 1968 (c.64), Employers' Liability Act 1880, Occupiers' Liability Act 1957 (c.31) s 2, s 2(4), Road Traffic Act 1960, Road Traffic Act 1930 (c.43) s 12, Rules of the Supreme Court (Revision) 1965 (SI 1965 1776) para 7

Court membership
- Judges sitting: Lord Denning MR, Salmon LJ and Megaw LJ

Keywords
- Negligence, standard of care, road traffic

Nettleship v Weston [1971] 2 QB 691 is an English Court of Appeal judgment dealing with the breach of duty in negligence claims. In this case the court had considered the question of the standard of care that should be applied to a learner driver, and whether it should be the same as is expected of an experienced driver.

== Facts ==
Mr. Nettleship, the plaintiff (claimant), agreed to teach Mrs Weston, the defendant, to drive in her husband’s car, after he had inquired the insurance policy. During one of the lessons, the defendant lost control of the car and caused an accident in which the plaintiff was injured. The defendant argued that the plaintiff was well aware of her lack of skill and that the court should make allowance for her since she could not be expected to drive like an experienced motorist.

== Judgment ==
The Court of Appeal, consisting of Lord Denning MR, Salmon LJ and Megaw LJ held that applying a lower standard to the learner driver because the instructor was aware of her inexperience would result in complicated shifting standards. It would imply, for example, that an inexperienced doctor owed his patient a lower standard of care if the patient was aware of his lack of experience. The standard of care for a learner driver would be the usual standard applied to drivers: that of an experienced and skilled driver. The policy consideration that played a role in this decision was that the learner driver was covered by insurance.

Lord Denning MR said the following:

The high standard thus imposed by the judges is, I believe, largely the result of the policy of the Road traffic Acts. Parliament requires every driver to be insured against third-party risks. The reason is so that a person injured by a moto-car should not be left to bear the loss on his own, but should be compensated out of the insurance fund. The fund is better able to bear it than he can. But the injured person is only able to recover if the driver is liable in law. So the judges see to it that he is liable, unless he can prove care and skill of a high standard... Thus we are, in this branch of the law, moving away from the concept: ‘No liability without fault’. We are beginning to apply the test: ‘On whom should the risk fall?’ Morally the learner-driver is not at fault; but legally she is liable to be because she is insured and the risk should fall on her...

Over the dissent of Salmon LJ, the Court of Appeal held that the instructor was also responsible for the accident as he was partially in control of the car and should only be able to recover half of his damages due to contributory negligence.

== See also ==
- Duty of care in English law
- Breach of duty in English law
- Wilsher v Essex Area Health Authority

Legislation

- Civil Evidence Act 1968 (c.64)
- Employers' Liability Act 1880
- Occupiers' Liability Act 1957 (c.31) s 2, s 2(4)
- Road Traffic Act 1960
- Road Traffic Act 1930 (c.43) s 12
- Rules of the Supreme Court (Revision) 1965 (SI 1965 1776) para 7
