= John Megaw =

Irish judge and rugby union player (born 1909)

The Right Honourable Sir John Megaw CBE TD

Personal details
- Born: John Megaw; 16 September 1909 Dublin, United Kingdom (now Ireland)
- Died: 27 December 1997 (aged 88) London, England
- Education: St John's College, Cambridge; Harvard Law School
- Occupation: Judge
- Profession: Barrister

Sir John Megaw, CBE, TD (16 September 1909 – 27 December 1997) was a British judge who eventually rose to Lord Justice of Appeal and Irish international rugby union player.

== Early life and career ==
Born in Dublin, Megaw was the son of Irish (later Northern Irish) politician and judge Robert Megaw and the brother of the crystallographer Helen Megaw. After the creation of the Irish Free State, his father, a strong Protestant, relocated the family to Belfast. He was educated at the Royal Academical Institution in Belfast, before being elected to an open scholarship in Classics at St John's College, Cambridge. After gaining a first in Part I of the classical tripos, he switched to Law, gaining a first in Part II of the law tripos and in the LLB (which, at the time was a postgraduate law degree). He then attended Harvard Law School on a Choate fellowship. He also played rugby union internationally for Ireland, delaying his call to the bar for a term to take part in a match.

Megaw was called to the bar by Gray's Inn in 1934, having gained a certificate of honour in the bar finals. He became a pupil of Henry Willink at 3 Essex Court, and became a tenant there. Through devilling for Willink, Megaw became known to the India Office, and was regularly retained by the Indian government to appear in front of the Judicial Committee of the Privy Council. His practice was mainly in commercial law, in which he distinguished himself.

Megaw married in 1938. The same year, disapproving of the Munich Agreement, he joined the Territorial Army. Called up as a gunner in 1939, he saw active service in London during the Blitz, before being posted to a staff position in Washington DC. He was demobilized with the rank of colonel and was awarded the US Legion of Merit.

Returning to the bar after the war, Megaw took silk in 1953, and was made silk in Northern Ireland, even though he did not practice there. He was appointed Recorder of Middlesbrough in 1957 and elected a bencher of Gray's Inn in 1958, serving as treasurer in 1976.

During his career at the bar he acted as pupil master to Michael Kerr (also later a Lord Justice of Appeal) and was a chambers contemporary of John Donaldson (later Master of the Rolls).

== Judicial career ==
In 1961, on the recommendation of Lord Kilmuir, he was appointed to the High Court, receiving the customary knighthood. Assigned to the Queen's Bench Division, he also became President of the Restrictive Practices Court, but resigned from the latter in 1968, in protest against the government's use of legislation to overrule the court. In December 1964, he sentenced Ronald Cooper to death for murder, becoming the last judge to pronounce a death sentence at the Old Bailey.

He was promoted a Lord Justice of Appeal in 1969, and was sworn of the Privy Council. Having become dissatisfied with judicial work and aware that he would not be promoted to the House of Lords, he retired during the Long Vacation with little fanfare. After his retirement, he occasionally sat on the Privy Council and as an arbitrator. In 1981–82, he chaired the Committee of Inquiry into Civil Service Pay (Megaw Committee), formed in the aftermath of a Civil Service strike.

== Honours ==
In addition to the customary knighthood and appointment to the Privy Council, Megaw received the American Legion of Merit in 1946, the Territorial Decoration in 1951, and was appointed CBE in 1956 for service as a member of the Industrial Injuries Advisory Council. He was an honorary fellow of St John's College, Cambridge, and received an honorary LLD from Queen's University Belfast.

== Family ==
Megaw married Eleanor Grace Chapman in 1938; they had one son and two daughters.

== Notable cases ==
Notable judicial decisions of Lord Justice Megaw included:

- Ward v Tesco Stores Ltd
- Re Baden's Deed Trusts (No 2)
- Nettleship v Weston
- Maredelanto Compania Naviera SA v Bergbau-Handel GmbH
- Tenax Steamship Co v Owners of the Motor Vessel Brimnes
- Lawrence v Metropolitan Police Comr (in the Court of Appeal)
- Thornton v Shoe Lane Parking Ltd
- Bunge Corp v Tradax Export SA (in the Court of Appeal)
- Aluminium Industrie Vaassen BV v Romalpa Aluminium Ltd

== Rugby Union ==
John Megaw was also capped twice as an international rugby union player for Ireland in the 1930s, once 1934 against Wales and again in 1938 against England, both times playing at Number Eight. Ireland lost both tests.
