= Synallagmatic contract =

In civil law systems, a synallagmatic contract is a contract in which each party to the contract is bound to provide something to the other party. Its name is derived from the Ancient Greek συνάλλαγμα (synallagma), meaning mutual agreement. Examples of synallagmatic contracts include contracts of sale, of service, or of hiring.

In common law jurisdictions, it is roughly the equivalent of a bilateral contract and may be contrasted with a gift (as such a relationship is not one of contract) or a unilateral contract in which only one party makes an enforceable promise.

In his comments on the case of Hong Kong Fir Shipping Co Ltd. v Kawasaki Kisen Kaisha Ltd. (1957), Lord Diplock said:

"Every synallagmatic contract contains in it the seeds of the problem - in what event will a party be relieved of his undertaking to do that which he has agreed to do but has not yet done?"
