= C&P Haulage v Middleton =

C&P Haulage Co Ltd v Middleton
- Court: Court of Appeal of England and Wales
- Citation: [1983] EWCA Civ 5 [1983] 1 WLR 1461, [1983] 3 All ER 94

Court membership
- Judge sitting: Ackner LJ

C&P Haulage Co Ltd v Middleton [1983] EWCA Civ 5 is an English contract law case, concerning damages for costs incurred by a claimant related to a defendant's breach of contract.

== Facts ==
George Middleton had a licence to occupy premises for six months at a time, renewable. He used it for his car repair business. He improved the property, even though the contract stated fixtures were not to be removed at the end of the licence. C&P Haulage Co Ltd ejected him for breach of contract. Mr Middleton argued he should be entitled to damages for the cost of the improvements he had made.

== Judgment ==
Ackner LJ held that Middleton’s loss did not flow from the breach of contract, but him going and doing the repairs when he was not meant to. So no recovery of reliance loss was available, where it would allow Middleton to escape a bad bargain or reverse the contractual allocation of risk.

The case which I have found of assistance — and I am grateful to counsel for their research — is a case in the British Columbia Supreme Court: Bowlay Logging Ltd v. Domtar Ltd [1978] 4 W.W.R. 105 . Berger J., in a very careful and detailed judgment, goes through various English and American authorities and refers to the leading textbook writers, and I will only quote a small part of his judgment. At the bottom of p. 115 he refers to the work of Professor L.L. Fuller and William R. Perdue, Jr., in “The Reliance Interest in Contract Damages: 1” (1936), 46 Yale Law Jour. 52 and their statement, at p. 79:

“We will not in a suit for reimbursement for losses incurred in reliance on a contract knowingly put the plaintiff in a better position than he would have occupied had the contract been fully performed.”

Berger J., at p. 116, then refers to L. Albert & Son v. Armstrong Rubber Co. (1949) 178 F. 2d 182 in which Learned Hand C.J., speaking for the Circuit Court of Appeals, Second Circuit:

“held that on a claim for compensation for expenses in part performance the defendant was entitled to deduct whatever he could prove the plaintiff would have lost if the contract had been fully performed.”

What Berger J. had to consider was this, p. 105:

“The parties entered into a contract whereby the plaintiff would cut timber under the defendant's timber sale, and the defendant would be responsible for hauling the timber away from the site of the timber sale. The plaintiff claimed the defendant was in breach of the contract as the defendant had not supplied sufficient trucks to make the plaintiff's operation, which was losing money, viable, and claimed not for loss of profits but for compensation for expenditures. The defendant argued that the plaintiff's operation lost money not because of a lack of trucks but because of the plaintiff's inefficiency, and, further, that even if the defendant had breached the contract the plaintiff should not be awarded damages because its operation would have lost money in any case.”

This submission was clearly accepted because the plaintiff was awarded only nominal damages, and Berger J. said, at p. 117:

“The law of contract compensates a plaintiff for damages resulting from the defendant's breach; it does not compensate a plaintiff for damages resulting from his making a bad bargain. Where it can be seen that the plaintiff would have incurred a loss on the contract as a whole, the expenses he has incurred are losses flowing from entering into the contract, not losses flowing from the defendant's breach. In these circumstances, the true consequence of the defendant's breach is that the plaintiff is released from his obligation to complete the contract — or in other words, he is saved from incurring further losses. If the law of contract were to move from compensating for the consequences of breach to compensating for the consequences of entering into contracts, the law would run contrary to the normal expectations of the world of commerce. The burden of risk would be shifted from the plaintiff to the defendant. The defendant would become the insurer of the plaintiff's enterprise. Moreover, the amount of the damages would increase not in relation to the gravity or consequences of the breach but in relation to the inefficiency with which the plaintiff carried out the contract. The greater his expenses owing to inefficiency, the greater the damages. The fundamental principle upon which damages are measured under the law of contract is restitutio in integrum. The principle contended for here by the plaintiff would entail the award of damages not to compensate the plaintiff but to punish the defendant.”

It is urged here that the garage itself was merely an element in the defendant's business; it was not a profit-making entity on its own. Nevertheless, if as a result of being kept out of these premises the defendant had found no other premises to go to for a period of time, his claim would clearly have been a claim for such loss of profit as he could establish his business suffered.

In my judgment, the approach of Berger J. is the correct one. It is not the function of the courts where there is a breach of contract knowingly, as this would be the case, to put a plaintiff in a better financial position than if the contract had been properly performed. In this case the defendant who is the plaintiff in the counterclaim, if he was right in his claim, would indeed be in a better position because, as I have already indicated, had the contract been lawfully determined as it could have been in the middle of December, there would have been no question of his recovering these expenses.

== See also ==
- English contract law
- Johnson v Agnew [1980] AC 367
- Habton Farms v Nimmo [2003] EWCA Civ 68, [2004] QB 1, [2003] 3 WLR 633
- The Golden Victory or Golden Strait Corporation v Nippon Yusen Kubishka Kaisha [2007] UKHL 12
