= Boone v Eyre =

English contract law case

- Citation: (1777) 1 H Bl 273

Keywords
- Slavery, forced labour, contract

Boone v Eyre (1777) 1 H Bl 273 is an English contract law case concerned with substantial performance and conditions precedent, with the purported ownership and lease of a plantation and a group of enslaved people being the center of disagreement.

== Facts ==
The plaintiff sued the defendant for not paying a £160 annuity (for life) for a plantation in the West Indies that came with a group of slaves, after an initial payment of £500. The defendant contended that when the plaintiff made the deed, the plaintiff did not lawfully possess the slaves, and therefore had no good title. Therefore, the defendant was arguing he had the right to terminate the agreement and cease performance.

== Judgment ==
Lord Mansfield said the following:

The distinction is very clear. Where mutual covenants go to the whole of the consideration on both sides they are mutual conditions, the one precedent to the other. But where they go only to a part, where a breach may be paid for in damages, there the defendant has a remedy on his covenant and shall not plead it as a condition precedent. If this plea were to be allowed, any one negro not being the property of the plaintiff would bar the action.

== See also ==
- English contract law
