= Jackson v Union Marine Insurance =

Spirit of the Dawn
- Court: Exchequer Chamber
- Decided: 2 December 1874
- Citation: (1874) 10 Common Pleas 125

Court membership
- Judges sitting: Bramwell B, Blackburn J, Mellor J, Lush J, Amphlett B and Cleasby B (dissenting)

Case opinions
- Bramwell B and Cleasby B (dissenting)

Jackson v Union Marine Insurance (citation: (1874) 10 Common Pleas 125) is an early English contract law case concerning the right of parties to an agreement to terminate that agreement.

== Facts ==
Mr. Jackson owned a ship - the Spirit of the Dawn. In November 1871 he entered a charter-party for the ship to go from Liverpool to Newport, and load iron rails, which were going to be used for a new line in San Francisco. Mr Jackson also had an insurance policy with Union Marine Insurance, which covered losses for "perils of the sea". The ship left on 2 January 1872 but ran aground in Carnarvon Bay the next day. She needed repairs until August. The charterers on 15 February secured another ship to carry the rails. Jackson brought an action on the insurance policy on the chartered freight.

The jury held that the delay for repairs was so long that it brought the contract in a commercial sense to an end.

== Judgment ==
Bramwell B held with the majority (Blackburn J, Mellor J, Lush J and Amphlett B) that the jury had been correct. The delay meant the charterers were not bound to load the ship and that there was a loss of the chartered freight by perils of the sea.

The first question is, whether the plaintiff could have maintained an action against the charterers for not loading; for, if he could, there certainly has not been a loss of the chartered freight by any of the perils insured against.

In considering this question, the finding of the jury that “the time necessary to get the ship off and repairing her so as to be a cargo-carrying ship was so long as to put an end in a commercial sense to the commercial speculation entered into by the shipowner and charterers,” is all important. I do not think the question could have been left in better terms; but it may be paraphrased or amplified. I understand that the jury have found that the voyage the parties contemplated had become impossible; that a voyage undertaken after the ship was sufficiently repaired would have been a different voyage, not, indeed, different as to the ports of loading and discharge, but different as a different adventure,—a voyage for which at the time of the charter the plaintiff had not in intention engaged the ship, nor the charterers the cargo; a voyage as different as though it had been described as intended to be a spring voyage, while the one after the repair would be an autumn voyage.

It is manifest that, if a definite voyage had been contracted for, and became impossible by perils of the seas, that voyage would have been prevented and the freight to be earned thereby would have been lost by the perils of the seas. The power which undoubtedly would exist to perform, say, an autumn voyage in lieu of a spring voyage, if both parties were willing, would be a power to enter into a new agreement, and would no more prevent the loss of the spring voyage and its freight than would the power (which would exist if both parties were willing) to perform a voyage between different ports with a different cargo.

But the defendants say that here the contract was not to perform a definite voyage, but was at some and any future time, however distant, provided it was by no default in the shipowner, and only postponed by perils of the seas, to carry a cargo of rails from Newport to San Francisco; and that, no matter at what distance of time, at what loss to the shipowner, whatever might be the ship's engagements, however freights might have risen, or seamen's wages, though the voyage at the time when the ship was ready might be twice as dangerous, and possibly twice as long, from fogs, ice, and other perils, though war might have broken out meanwhile between the country to whose port she was to sail and some other, still she was bound to take and had the right to demand the cargo of the shippers; who in like way had a right to have carried and were bound to find the agreed cargo, or, if that had been sent on already, a cargo of the same description, no matter at what loss to them, and however useless the transport of the goods might be to them. This is so inconvenient, that, though fully impressed with the considerations so forcibly put by Mr. Aspland, and retaining the opinion I expressed in Tarrabochia v Hickie, I think that, unless the rules of law prohibit it, we ought to hold the contrary.

The question turns on the construction and effect of the charter. By it the vessel is to sail to Newport with all possible dispatch, perils of the seas excepted. It is said this constitutes the only agreement as to time, and, provided all possible dispatch is used, it matters not when she arrives at Newport. I am of a different opinion. If this charterparty be read as a charter for a definite voyage or adventure, then it follows that there is necessarily an implied condition that the ship shall arrive at Newport in time for it. Thus, if a ship was chartered to go from Newport to St. Michael's in terms in time for the fruit season, and take coals out and bring fruit home, it would follow, notwithstanding the opinion expressed in Touteng v Hubbard, on which I will remark afterwards, that, if she did not get to Newport in time to get to St. Michael's for the fruit season, the charterer would not be bound to load at Newport, though she had used all possible dispatch to get there, and though there was an exception of perils of the seas.

The two stipulations, to use all possible dispatch, and to arrive in time for the voyage, are not repugnant; nor is either superfluous or useless. The shipowner, in the case put, expressly agrees to use all possible dispatch: that is not a condition precedent; the sole remedy for and right consequent on the breach of it is an action. He also impliedly agrees that the ship shall arrive in time for the voyage: that is a condition precedent as well as an agreement; and its non-performance not only gives the charterer a cause of action, but also releases him. Of course, if these stipulations, owing to excepted perils, are not performed, there is no cause of action, but there is the same release of the charterer. The same reasoning would apply if the terms were, to “use all possible dispatch, and further, and as a condition precedent, to be ready at the port of loading on June 1st.” That reasoning also applies to the present case. If the charter be read, as for a voyage or adventure not precisely defined by time or otherwise, but still for a particular voyage, arrival at Newport in time for it is necessarily a condition precedent. It seems to me it must be so read. I should say reason and good sense require it. The difficulty is supposed to be that there is some rule of law to the contrary. This I cannot see; and it seems to me that, in this case, the shipowner undertook to use all possible dispatch to arrive at the port of loading, and also agreed that the ship should arrive there “at such a time that in a commercial sense the commercial speculation entered into by the shipowner and charterers should not be at an end, but in existence.” That latter agreement is also a condition precedent. Not arriving at such a time puts an end to the contract; though, as it arises from an excepted peril, it gives no cause of action.

The same result is arrived at by what is the same argument differently put. Where no time is named for the doing of anything, the law attaches a reasonable time. Now, let us suppose this charterparty had said nothing about arriving with all possible dispatch. In that case, had the ship not arrived at Newport in a reasonable time, owing to the default of the shipowner, the charterers would have had a right of action against the owner, and would have had a right to withdraw from the contract. It is impossible to hold that, in that case, the owner would have a right to say, “I came a year after the time I might have come, because meanwhile I have been profitably employing my ship: you must load me, and bring your action for damages.” The charterers would be discharged, because the implied condition to arrive in a reasonable time was not performed. Now, let us suppose the charter contains, as here, that the ship shall arrive with all possible dispatch,—I ask again, is that so inconsistent with or repugnant to a further condition that at all events she shall arrive within a reasonable time? or is that so needless a condition that it is not to be implied? I say certainly not. I must repeat the foregoing reasoning. Let us suppose them both expressed, and it will be seen they are not inconsistent nor needless. Thus, I will use all possible dispatch to get the ship to Newport, but at all events she shall arrive in a reasonable time for the adventure contemplated. I hold, therefore, that the implied condition of a reasonable time exists in this charter. Now, what is the effect of the exception of perils of the seas, and of delay being caused thereby? Suppose it was not there, and not implied, the shipowner would be subject to an action for not arriving in a reasonable time, and the charterers would be discharged. Mr. Benjamin says the exception would be implied. How that is, it is not necessary to discuss, as the words are there: but, if it is so, it is remarkable as shewing what must be implied from the necessity of the case.

The words are there. What is their effect? I think this: they excuse the shipowner, but give him no right. The charterer has no cause of action, but is released from the charter. When I say he is, I think both are. The condition precedent has not been performed, but by default of neither. It is as though the charter were conditional on peace being made between countries A. and B., and it was not; or as though the charterer agreed to load a cargo of coals, strike of pitmen excepted. If a strike of probably long duration began, he would be excused from putting the coals on board, and would have no right to call on the shipowner to wait till the strike was over. The shipowner would be excused from keeping his ship waiting, and have no right to call on the charterer to load at a future time. This seems in accordance with general principles. The exception is an excuse for him who is to do the act, and operates to save him from an action and make his non-performance not a breach of contract, but does not operate to take away the right the other party would have had, if the non-performance had been a breach of contract, to retire from the engagement: and, if one party may, so may the other. Thus, A. enters the service of B., and is ill and cannot perform his work. No action will lie against him; but B. may hire a fresh servant, and not wait his recovery, if his illness would put an end, in a business sense, to their business engagement, and would frustrate the object of that engagement: a short illness would not suffice, if consistent with the object they had in view. So, if A. engages B. to make a drawing, say, of some present event, for an illustrated paper, and B. is attacked with blindness which will disable him for six months, it cannot be doubted that, though A. could maintain no action against B., he might procure some one else to make the drawing. So, of an engagement to write a book, and insanity of the intended author. So, of the case I have put, of an exception of a strike of pitmen.

There is, then, a condition precedent that the vessel shall arrive in a reasonable time. On failure of this, the contract is at an end and the charterers discharged, though they have no cause of action, as the failure arose from an excepted peril. The same result follows, then, whether the implied condition is treated as one that the vessel shall arrive in time for that adventure, or one that it shall arrive in a reasonable time, that time being, in time for the adventure contemplated. And in either case, as in the express cases supposed, and in the analogous cases put, non-arrival and incapacity by that time ends the contract; the principle being, that, though non-performance of a condition may be excused, it does not take away the right to rescind from him for whose benefit the condition was introduced.

On these grounds, I think that, in reason, in principle, and for the convenience of both parties, it ought to be held in this case that the charterers were, on the finding of the jury, discharged.

It remains to examine the authorities. The first in date relied on by the defendants is Hadley v Clarke. Now, it may safely be said that there the question was wholly different from the present. There was no question in that case as to the performance of a condition precedent to be ready at a certain or within a reasonable time, or such a time that the voyage in question, the adventure, should be accomplished and not frustrated. That condition had been performed: the ship had loaded and sailed in due time. The plaintiff had had a part of the benefit intended. The defendant had in justice earned part of his freight. Had the plaintiff demanded his goods at Falmouth, he ought to have paid something for their carriage there. He could not, therefore, well have said that he would not go on with the adventure, but undo it. But, if I am right, unless both could, neither could. Further, in that case there was no finding, nor anything equivalent to a finding, that the objects of the parties were frustrated. This case is therefore in every way distinguishable.

Then, there is the case of Touteng v Hubbard. The opinion there expressed was obiter,—of weight, no doubt; but not of the same weight it would have been had it been the ratio decidendi. I cannot think that it would have been so held, had it been necessary to act on it. To hold that a charterer is bound to furnish a cargo of fruit at a time of year when there is no fruit,—at a time of year different to what he and the shipowner must have contemplated, the change to that time being no fault of his, but the misfortune at best of the shipowner,—is so extravagant, when the consequences become apparent, that it could not be. Suppose a charter to fetch a cargo of ice from Norway, entered into at such a time that the vessel would reach its destination, with reasonable dispatch, in February, when there was ice, and bring it back in June, when ice was wanted, and by perils of the seas it could not get to Norway till the ice was melted, nor return till after ice was of no value: can it be that the charterer would be bound to load? that he had agreed in those events to do so?

Another case is Hurst v Usborne. That is a case of which, if I knew no more than I learn from the books, I should say it did not decide the question we have before us. It is true that the report in the Law Journal, as Mr. Aspland pointed out, says that Mr. Justice Cresswell said he knew of no time the shipowner was bound to, except to use reasonable dispatch. Still, I cannot see from the reports that the point now before us was presented to the judges in that case. My Brother Blackburn, who was counsel in the cause, says it was intended to raise this point by the evidence that was rejected at nisi prius. No doubt, therefore, that was so; but I cannot think it so understood by the Court. I see no adjudication on it. Mr. Butt pointed out that the charter was for barley or other lawful merchandise. Even if for barley only, it does not appear that barley might not have been stored at Limerick, nor that barley from Limerick arriving in England at the time it would, had the defendant loaded, would not have been as valuable as barley arriving earlier. I cannot but think it was a hasty decision: a rule was refused; and certainly one would think, after the argument we have heard, that the matter was worth discussing. At the same time, its tendency is favorable to the defendants. I think it is unsatisfactory, and, if a decision on the question now before us, wrong. Mr. Justice Willes did not seem to be of opinion that the law was as he is supposed to have laid it down in that case: see his judgment in M'Andrew v Chapple, where, indeed, there had been a breach of his contract by the shipowner; but the observations are general. I may also properly refer to the opinions, if not of myself, of my Brothers Blackburn and Brett in Rankin v Potter. They undoubtedly assume the law to be as the plaintiff contends.

There is also Geipel v Smith, nearly if not quite in point. The shipowner there was excused, not merely for refusing to take a cargo to a port which became blockaded after the charter, but also in effect for refusing to do so after the blockade was removed. Restraint of princes not only excused, but discharged him. The same, no doubt, would have been held as to the charterers.

Then, there are the cases which hold that, where the shipowner has not merely broken his contract, but so broken it that the condition precedent is not performed, the charterer is discharged: see Freeman v Taylor. Why? Not merely because the contract is broken. If it is not a condition precedent, what matters it whether it is unperformed with or without excuse? Not arriving with due diligence, or at a day named, is the subject of a cross action only. But, not arriving in time for the voyage contemplated, but at such a time that it is frustrated, is not only a breach of contract, but discharges the charterer. And so it should, though he has such an excuse that no action lies. Taylor v Caldwell is a strong authority in the same direction. I cannot but think, then, that the weight of authority, as might be expected, is on the side of reason and convenience.

On the other question, viz. whether, though the charterers by perils insured against had a right to refuse to load the cargo, there has been a loss of freight by perils of the seas,—I am of opinion there has been.

It was argued that the doctrine of Causa proxima, non remota, spectetur, applies; and that the proximate cause of the loss of the freight here was, the refusal of the charterers to load. But, if I am right, that the voyage, the adventure, was frustrated by perils of the seas, both parties were discharged, and a loading of cargo in August would have been a new adventure, a new agreement. But, even if not, the maxim does not apply. The perils of the seas do not cause something which causes something else. The freight is lost unless the charterers choose to go on. They do not. In the case of goods carried part of the voyage, and the ship lost, but the goods saved, the shipowner may carry them on if he chooses, but is not bound. Suppose he does not, his freight is lost. So, if he does not choose to repair a vessel which remains in specie, but is a constructive total loss.

For these reasons, I think the judgment should be affirmed.

My Brothers Blackburn, Mellor, and Amphlett agree in this judgment; as does my Brother Lush, who, however, heard part only of the argument.

== See also ==
- English contract law
