= Bunge Corp v Tradax Export SA =

Bunge Corporation v Tradax SA
- Court: House of Lords
- Full case name: Bunge Corporation, New York (Original Appellants and Cross- Respondents) v. Tradax Export S.A., Panama (Original Respondents and Cross-Appellants)
- Decided: May 7, 1981
- Citations: [1981] UKHL 11, [1981] 1 WLR 711, [1981] 2 All ER 513

Court membership
- Judges sitting: Lord Wilberforce, Lord Fraser, Lord Scarman, Lord Lowry, Lord Roskill

Case opinions
- Lord Wilberforce, Lord Scarman, Lord Lowry, Lord Roskill

Keywords
- Termination, condition

Bunge Corporation v Tradax Export SA [1981] UKHL 11 is an English contract law case concerning the right to terminate performance of a contract.

== Facts ==
Bunge Corp sued Tradax SA for wrongful termination of its agreement to supply Bunge with 5,000 tons of soya bean meal on the basis that giving notice four days late for loading the ship was not sufficiently serious a breach to warrant termination. The soya bean meal was going on three shipments from a port in the Gulf of Mexico nominated by Tradax and on a ship nominated by Bunge. One of the shipments was to be during June 1975. Clause 7 said Bunge was to ‘give at least 15 days consecutive notice’ of the readiness of the ship for loading (i.e. which at the time mean 13 June). Bunge gave notice on 17 June. Tradax argued this was a breach and purported to terminate and recover damages for the difference between the contract price and the market price (which had just fallen).

== Judgment ==
The House of Lords held that proper construction of the contract meant clause 7 was a condition, so Tradax had been entitled to terminate. The contract had to be construed to give effect to the parties' intentions, and although because it allows the right to terminate one would not quickly hold that in mercantile contracts agreements contained conditions, this one did.

Lord Wilberforce said the following:

The test suggested by the appellants was a different one. One must consider, they said, the breach actually committed and then decide whether that default would deprive the party not in default of substantially the whole benefit of the contract. They invoked even certain passages in the judgment of Diplock L.J. in Hong Kong Fir to support it. One may observe in the first place that the introduction of a test of this kind would be commercially most undesirable. It would expose the parties, after a breach of one, two, three, seven and other numbers of days to an argument whether this delay would have left time for the seller to provide the goods. It would make it, at the time, at least difficult, and sometimes impossible, for the supplier to know whether he could do so. It would fatally remove from a vital provision in the contract that certainty which is the most indispensable quality of mercantile contracts, and lead to a large increase in arbitrations. It would confine the seller—perhaps after arbitration and reference through the courts—to a remedy in damages which might be extremely difficult to quantify. These are all serious objections in practice. But I am clear that the submission is unacceptable in law. The judgment of Diplock LJ does not give any support and ought not to give any encouragement to any such proposition; for beyond doubt it recognises that it is open to the parties to agree that, as regards a particular obligation, any breach shall entitle the party not in default to treat the contract as repudiated. Indeed, if he were not doing so he would, in a passage which does not profess to be more than clarificatory, be discrediting a long and uniform series of cases—at least from Bowes v Shand (1877) 2 App. Cas. 455 onwards which have been referred to by my noble and learned friend. Lord Roskill. It remains true, as Lord Roskill has pointed out in Cehave NV v Bremer Handelsgesellschaft mbH [1976] 1 Q.B. 44, that the courts should not be too ready to interpret contractual clauses as conditions. And I have myself commended, and continue to commend, the greater flexibility in the law of contracts to which Hong Kong Fir points the way (Reardon Smith Line Ltd v Hansen-Tangen [1976] 1 W.L.R. 989, 998). But I do not doubt that, in suitable cases, the courts should not be reluctant, if the intentions of the parties as shown by the contract so indicate, to hold that an obligation has the force of a condition, and that indeed they should usually do so in the case of time clauses in mercantile contracts. To such cases the "gravity" of the breach " approach of Hong Kong Fir would be unsuitable. I need only add on this point that the word " expressly " used by Diplock LJ at p.70 of his judgment in Hong Kong Fir should not be read as requiring the actual use of the word " condition ": any term or terms of the contract, which, fairly read, have the effect indicated, are sufficient. Lord Diplock himself has given recognition to this in this House (Photo Production Ltd v Securicor Transport Ltd [I980] A.C. 827, 849). I therefore reject that part of the appellant's argument which was based upon it, and I must disagree with the judgment of the learned trial judge in so far as he accepted it. I respectfully endorse, on the other hand, the full and learned treatment of this issue in the judgment of Megaw L.J. in the Court of Appeal... In conclusion, the statement of the law in Halsbury's Laws of England, 4th Ed. Vol. 9 (Contract) paragraphs 481-2, including the footnotes to paragraph 482 (generally approved in the House in the United Scientific Holdings case), appears to me to be correct, in particular in asserting (1) that the court will require precise compliance with stipulations as to time wherever the circumstances of the case indicate that this would fulfil the intention of the parties, and (2) that broadly speaking time will be considered of the essence in " mercantile" contracts—with footnote reference to authorities which I have mentioned.

Lord Scarman and Lord Roskill concurred.

== See also ==
- English contract law
