= L Schuler AG v Wickman Machine Tool Sales Ltd =

- Court: House of Lords
- Decided: April 4, 1973
- Citations: [1973] UKHL 2, [1974] AC 235

Court membership
- Judges sitting: Lord Reid, Lord Morris, Lord Wilberforce, Lord Simon, Lord Kilbrandon

Keywords
- Termination, vcondition

L Schuler AG v Wickman Machine Tool Sales Ltd [1973] UKHL 2 is an English contract law case, concerning the right to terminate performance of a contract.

== Facts ==
Wickman alleged that Schuler AG wrongfully terminated their contract for Wickman to visit car makers to market Schuler's panel presses, as their sole representative for four-and-a-half years, even though Wickman had failed to make visits. Clause 7(b) said, ‘It shall be a condition of this agreement that [Wickman] shall send its representatives to visit [the six largest UK car manufacturers of the time] at least once in every week for the purpose of soliciting orders for panel presses.’ Clause 11 said either party could end the agreement if the other was in material breach and did not change its behaviour on 60 days' notice. Mr Wickman failed to make any visits at the start. This was waived by Schuler at first, but then when Wickman was making some but not all the visits, Schuler terminated. Wickman sued, alleging Schuler was not allowed to terminate.

== Judgment ==
The House of Lords held by a majority that Schuler was not entitled to terminate, and held clause 7(b) to be not a condition. Clause 7 was to be read with clause 11, so that notice would need to be given to remedy the situation, and if notice and 60 days to change was not given, then clause 7 would not be breached. Only after 60 days without compliance would ‘rescission’ (i.e. termination) be allowed. Lord Reid said the following.

Schuler maintains that the use of the word " condition " is in itself enough to establish this intention. No doubt some words used by lawyers do have a rigid inflexible meaning. But we must remember that we are seeking to discover intention as disclosed by the contract as a whole. Use of the word " condition " is an indication—even a strong indication—of such an intention but it is by no means conclusive.

The fact that a particular construction leads to a very unreasonable result must be a relevant consideration. The more unreasonable the result the more unlikely it is that the parties can have intended it, and if they do intend it the more necessary it is that they shall make that intention abundantly clear.

Clause 7(b) requires that over a long period each of the six firms shall be visited every week by one or other of two named representatives. It makes no provision for Wickman being entitled to substitute others even on the death or retirement of one of the named representatives. Even if one could imply some right to do this, it makes no provision for both representatives being ill during a particular week. And it makes no provision for the possibility that one or other of the firms may tell Wickman that they cannot receive Wickman's representative during a particular week. So if the parties gave any thought to the matter at all they must have realised the probability that in a few cases out of the 1,400 required visits a visit as stipulated would be impossible. But if Schuler's contention is right failure to make even one visit entitle them to terminate the contract however blameless Wickman might be.

This is so unreasonable that it must make me search for some other possible meaning of the contract. If none can be found then Wickman must suffer the consequences. But only if that is the only possible interpretation.

If I have to construe clause 7 standing by itself then I do find difficulty in reaching any other interpretation. But if clause 7 must be read with clause 11 the difficulty disappears. The word "condition" would make any breach of clause 7(b), however excusable, a material breach.

Lord Morris, Lord Simon and Lord Kilbrandon concurred.

Lord Wilberforce dissented, holding that Schuler should have been able to terminate.

Does Clause 7(b) amount to a " condition " or a " term "? (to call it an important or material term adds, with all respect, nothing but some intellectual assuagement). My Lords, I am clear in my own mind that it is a condition, but your Lordships take the contrary view. On a matter of construction of a particular document, to develop the reasons for a minority opinion serves no purpose. I am all the more happy to refrain from so doing because the judgments of Mocatta J., Stephenson L.J., and indeed of Edmund Davies L.J., on construction, give me complete satisfaction and I could in any case add little of value to their reasons. I would only add that, for my part, to call the clause arbitrary, capricious or fantastic, or to introduce as a test of its validity the ubiquitous reasonable man (I do not know whether he is English or German) is to assume, contrary to the evidence, that both parties to this contract adopted a standard of easygoing tolerance rather than one of aggressive, insistent punctuality and efficiency. This is not an assumption I am prepared to make, nor do I think myself entitled to impose the former standard upon the parties if their words indicate, as they plainly do, the latter. I note finally, that the result of treating the clause, so careful and specific in its requirements as a term is, in effect, to deprive the Appellants of any remedy in respect of admitted and by no means minimal breaches. The Arbitrator's finding that these breaches were not " material " was not, in my opinion, justified in law in the face of the parties' own characterisation of them in their document: indeed the fact that he was able to do so, and so leave the Appellants without remedy, argues strongly that the legal basis of his finding—that clause 7(b) was merely a term—is unsound.

== See also ==
- English contract law
