= List of landmark judgments of the House of Lords =

Important decisions by highest UK appellate court prior to 2009

This page lists legal decisions of the House of Lords. Until 30 September 2009, the House of Lords was the highest appellate court for the United Kingdom. Cases were determined not by the House of Lords itself, but by its Judicial Committee, consisting of up to nine legally qualified peers, generally referred to as "Law Lords". On 1 October 2009 its functions were transferred to the Supreme Court of the United Kingdom.

For a complete list of all legal cases heard by the House of Lords, see List of United Kingdom House of Lords cases.

Case	Date	OSCOLA Citation	Summary
Pinchon's case	1611		Early assumpsit and contract liability precedent
Sprat v Agar	1658		Early case on in third party contract law
Duke of Norfolk's Case	1682	3 Ch. Cas. 1, 22 E.R. 931	Rule against perpetuities
Mason v Keeling	1700	1 Ld Raym 606; 91 ER 1305	
Donaldson v Beckett	1774	1 E.R. 837	Copyright could not be a right in perpetuity
Hambly v. Trott	1776		Case in conversion and trover
Bach v Longman	1777		Early case in copyright law
Worlledge v Manning	1786		Case establishing modern concept of property
Steel v Houghton	1788	126 ER 32	Establishes the nature of property which imports absolute enjoyment'
Gee v Pritchard	1818		Precedent in copyright law
Wright v Tatham	1838	132 E.R. 877	Hearsay
Dimes v Grand Junction Canal	1852	3 HLC 759	A judge with a financial interest in one of the parties to a case is debarred from deciding a case involving that party; applying the principle "Nobody should be a judge in their own cause".
Hyde v Hyde	1866		1. established common law definition of marriage 2. institutions in foreign countries cannot be considered as valid under English law, unless they resemble the equivalent English institution
Rylands v Fletcher	1868	LR 3 H.L. 330	Liability could attach in tort for escape of materials from land
Hughes v Metropolitan Railway Co.	1877	2 A.C. 439	The first example of promissory estoppel being applied, although to delay rather than extinguish common-law rights.
Foakes v Beer	1884	L.R. 9 A.C. 605	Part-payment of a debt, in the absence of consideration, will not extinguish the debt.
Wakelin v London & South Western Railway Co.	1886	12 A.C. 41, 56 L.J.Q.B. 229 (H.L.)	A defendant's negligence must be causative of, rather than incidental to, damage to the plaintiff.
Wennhak v Morgan	1888		Leading deformation case
Hotson v East Berkshire Health			
Derry v Peek	1889	14 A.C. 337, 58 L.J. Ch. 864, 61 L.T. 265 (H.L.)	Fraud and negligent misstatement.
Phillips v Homfray	1892		precedent in of restitution.
Browne v Dunn	1893	6 R. 67 (H.L.)	An advocate must raise in Cross examination issues that are in dispute otherwise reliance on those issues will be prohibited.
Reddaway v Banham	1896	A.C. 199	Passing off
Salomon v A Salomon & Co Ltd	1897	A.C. 22	Recognized a corporation as a separate entity.
Walter v Lane	1900	A.C. 539 H.L.	Fixation by journalist creates copyright by publisher.
Heilbut, Symons & Co. v Buckleton	1913	A.C. 30	Innocent misrepresentation in contract gives no right to damages.
Lennard's Carrying Co Ltd v Asiatic Petroleum Co Ltd	1915	A.C. 705	Alter-ego theory of corporate liability, establishing that directors are the controlling minds of the company and therefore the company is liable for their misdeeds.
Dunlop Pneumatic Tyre v Selfridge and Co. Ltd.	1915	A.C. 847	Privity in contract law
Herd v Weardale Steel Coal & Coke Ltd.	1915	A.C. 67, 84 L.J.K.B. 121 (H.L.)	Unlawful imprisonment
Adam v Ward	1917	All E.R. 151	Definition of qualified privilege
Donoghue v Stevenson	1932	A.C. 532	Lord Atkin's famous statement about duty of care in the tort of negligence.
Bell v Lever Brothers	1932	A.C. 161	Mutual mistake at common law
Hillas v Arcos	1932	All E.R. 494	The court may imply terms into a contract based on the previous business dealings of the parties.
Woolmington v DPP	1935	A.C. 462 H.L.(E)	It is always incumbent on the prosecution in a criminal case to prove guilt beyond reasonable doubt.
Fibrosa Spolka Akcyjna v Fairbairn Lawson Combe Barbour	1942	2 All E.R. 122, 1943 A.C. 32	Frustration in contract law
Hay v Young	1943	A.C. 92	Nervous shock
Bolton v Stone	1951	A.C. 850, 1 All E.R. 1078 (H.L.)	Breach of duty of care.
Vine v National Dock Labour Board	1956	[1957] A.C. 488, [1956] 3 All E.R. 939	A statutory public body entrusted with quasi-judicial or disciplinary responsibilities cannot sub-delegate those powers to a committee or subordinate officer without express statutory authority; action taken without such power is ab initio void and cannot be cured by subsequent ratification.
Silkin v Beaverbrook Newspapers Ltd.	1958	1 W.L.R. 743	Freedom of speech.
Cavanagh v Ulster Weaving Co. Ltd.	1960	A.C. 1959 2 All E.R. (H.L.)	Evidence of trade practice is not determinative of whether there had been negligence on the facts.
Scruttons Ltd v Midland Silicones Ltd	1961	2 Lloyd's Rep. 365 (H.L.)	Privity of contract and the agency exception.
White & Carter (Councils) Ltd v McGregor	1961	All E.R. 1178	
Hughes v Lord Advocate	1963	All E.R. 705 (H.L.)	Manner of occurrence in tort of negligence (remoteness).
Hedley Byrne v Heller	1963	2 All E.R. 575	Economic loss in tort. Negligent misstatement.
Ridge v Baldwin	1964	A.C. 40	Judicial review, natural justice and fair hearing.
Practice Statement	1966		Change of practise regarding precedent, allowing the House of Lords to overrule its own previous decisions in exceptional circumstances.
Suisse Atlantique case	1966	2 All E.R. 61	
Regal (Hastings) v Gulliver	1967	2 A.C. 134	Fiduciary duties of company directors.
Anisminic v Foreign Compensation Commission	1969	2 A.C. 147	Judicial review, error of law
Home Office v Dorset Yacht Co.	1970	2 All E.R. 294	Tort, duty of care
Saunders v Anglia Building Society	1971	A.C. 1004	Importance of signature.
Tesco Supermarkets v Nattrass	1972	A.C. 153	Directing mind of corporation.
McGhee v National Coal Board	1972	3 All E.R. 1008 (H.L.)	Causation in tort.
Haughton v Smith	1975; 1973; 1974	AC 476; 3 All ER 1109; 3 W.L.R.	Attempted crimes, subsequently overturned by Criminal Attempts Act 1981
American Cyanamid Co. v Ethicon Ltd.	1975	A.C. 396 H.L.(E)	Injunctions
Miliangos v George Frank Ltd	1976	A.C. 443	UK courts were entitled to make awards of damages specified in foreign currency.
Anns v Merton London Borough Council	1978; 1977	A.C. 728; 2 All E.R. (H.L.)	Compensation of economic loss caused by negligence; overruled by Murphy v Brentwood District Council.
Securicor Transport Ltd. v Photo Production Ltd.	1980	2 W.L.R. 283	Exclusion clauses.
Ramsay v IRC	1982	A.C. 300	Disregarding artificial transactions designed solely to avoid tax.
Catnic Components Ltd. v Hill & Smith Ltd.	1982	R.P.C. 183	
Brinkibon Ltd v Stahag Stahl und Stahlwarenhandelsgesellschaft mbH	1983	2 A.C. 34	Contract law, instantaneous communication, approving Entores v Miles Far East Co.
Amin Rasheed Shipping Corp. v Kuwait Insurance Co.	1984	1 App Cas 50	Choice of law in contract, renvoi.
Furniss v Dawson	1984	A.C. 474	
Spiliada Maritime Corp v Cansulex Ltd	1987	A.C. 460	Forum non conveniens.
Hotson v East Berkshire Health Authority	1988	UKHL 1	Claims under the 'loss of a chance' doctrine in medical negligence are actionable only where it is more likely than not (>50% likely) that the defendant's negligence caused the plaintiff to lose the chance of recovery.
Caparo Industries Plc. v Dickman	1990		Pure economic loss in tort. Duty of care.
Attorney-General v Guardian Newspapers Ltd. (No. 2)	1990	1 AC 109	Confidentiality and public interest.
R v Brown	1993	2 W.L.R. 556	Sadomasochism and consent in criminal law.
Reynolds v Times Newspapers Ltd.	1999		Freedom of expression and defamation.
White v White	2000	1 A.C. 596	'Yardstick of equality' in division of matrimonial assets between spouses in ancillary relief proceedings
Fairchild v Glenhaven Funeral Services Ltd	2002	UKHL 22	Exposure to asbestos; multiple tortfeasors.
Campbell v MGN Ltd.	2004		
Regina v Special Adjudicator	2004	UKHL 26	
Kirin-Amgen v Hoechst Marion Roussel	2004	UKHL 46	
A and Others v Secretary of State for the Home Department	2005		Imprisonment without trial for terrorism suspects
R v Jones	2006	UKHL 16	Iraq war; international law
Barker v Corus	2006	UKHL 20	Exposure to asbestos; "proportionate liability" of multiple tortfeasors
A v Hoare	2008	UKHL 6	Tort law; limitation period of personal injuries claims; Limitation Act 1980.

== See also ==
- List of United Kingdom House of Lords cases
- List of Judicial Committee of the Privy Council cases
- List of Supreme Court of Judicature cases
