= Landmark cases (disambiguation) =

Landmark cases may refer to:

- Lists of landmark court decisions
- List of landmark court decisions in India
- List of landmark court decisions in the United States
- List of landmark United Kingdom House of Lords cases
- Landmark cases of the Supreme Court of Japan
- Landmark Cases: Historic Supreme Court Decisions, a C-SPAN series
- Landmark Cases in the Law of Contract, a 2008 book edited by Charles Mitchell and Paul Mitchell
- Landmark Cases in Equity, a 2012 book edited by Charles Mitchell and Paul Mitchell
- Landmark Cases in Family Law, a 2011 book edited by Stephen Gilmore, Jonathan Herring, and Rebecca Probert
- Landmark Cases in the Law of Tort, a 2010 book edited by Charles Mitchell and Paul Mitchell
- Landmark Cases in the Law of Restitution, a 2006 book edited by Charles Mitchell and Paul Mitchell
