= List of judgments of the House of Lords delivered in 2007 =

This is list of cases heard before the Judicial Committee of the House of Lords in 2007.

Title	Number	Date of Judgment
Al-Skeini and others (Respondents) v. Secretary of State for Defence (Appellant) Al-Skeini and others (Appellants) v. Secretary of State for Defence (Respondent) (Consolidated Appeals)	[2007] UKHL 26	13 June 2007
Beggs (AP) (Respondent) v. Scottish Ministers (Appellants) (Scotland)	[2007] UKHL 3	7 February 2007
Belfast City Council (Appellants) v. Miss Behavin' Limited (Respondents) (Northern Ireland)	[2007] UKHL 19	25 April 2007
Birmingham City Council (Appellants) v. Walker (FC) (Respondent)	[2007] UKHL 22	16 May 2007
Boake Allen Limited and others (Appellants) v. Her Majesty's Revenue and Customs (Respondents)	[2007] UKHL 25	23 May 2007
Capewell (Respondent) v. Her Majesty's Revenue and Customs (Appellants) and another	[2007] UKHL 2	31 January 2007
Ceredigion County Council (Respondents) v. Jones (FC) and others (FC) (Appellants)	[2007] UKHL 24	23 May 2007
Clarke (Appellant) v Fennoscandia Limited and others (Respondents) (Scotland)	[2007] UKHL 56	12 December 2007
Dabas (Appellant) v. High Court of Justice, Madrid (Respondent) (Criminal Appeal from Her Majesty's High Court of Justice)	[2007] UKHL 6	28 February 2007
Datec Electronics Holdings Limited and others (Respondents) v. United Parcels Services Limited (Appellants)	[2007] UKHL 23	16 May 2007
Fourie (Appellant) v. Le Roux and others (Respondents)	[2007] UKHL 1	24 January 2007
Golden Strait Corporation (Appellants) v. Nippon Yusen Kubishka Kaisha (Respondents)	[2007] UKHL 12	28 March 2007
Hamilton and others (Appellants) v. Allied Domecq Plc (Respondents) (Scotland)	[2007] UKHL 33	11 July 2007
Her Majesty’s Revenue & Customs (Respondents) v. William Grant & Sons Distillers Limited (Appellants) (Scotland) and Small (Her Majesty’s Inspector of Taxes (Respondent)) v. Mars UK Limited (Appellants) (Conjoined Appeals)	[2007] UKHL 15	28 March 2007
Huang (FC) (Respondent) v. Secretary of State for the Home Department (Appellant) and Kashmiri (FC) (Appellant) v. Secretary of State for the Home Department (Respondent) (Conjoined Appeals)	[2007] UKHL 11	21 March 2007
In re M (FC) and another (FC) (Children) (FC)	[2007] UKHL 55	5 December 2007
In re Officer L (Respondent) (Northern Ireland)	[2007] UKHL 36	31 July 2007
Johnston (Original Appellant and Cross-respondent) v. NEI International Combustion Limited (Original Respondents and Cross-appellants) Rothwell (Original Appellant and Cross-respondent) v. Chemical and Insulating Company Limited and others (Original Respondents and Cross-appellants) Topping (Original Appellant and Cross-respondent) v. Benchtown Limited (formerly Jones Bros Preston Limited) (Original Respondents and Cross-appellants)(Conjoined Appeals) Grieves (Appellant) v. F T Everard & Sons and others (Respondents)	[2007] UKHL 39	17 October 2007
Jones (Respondent) v.Garnett (Her Majesty's Inspector of Taxes) (Appellant)	[2007] UKHL 35	25 July 2007
Jordan (AP) (Appellant) v. Lord Chancellor and another (Respondents) (Northern Ireland) McCaughey (AP) (Appellant) v. Chief Constable of the Police Service Northern Ireland (Respondent) (Northern Ireland)	[2007] UKHL 14	28 March 2007
Kola (FC) and another (FC) (Appellants) v Secretary of State for Work and Pensions (Respondent)	[2007] UKHL 54	28 November 2007
Lonsdale (t/a Lonsdale Agencies) (Appellant) v. Howard & Hallam Limited (Respondents)	[2007] UKHL 32	4 July 2007
Melville Dundas Limited (in receivership) and others (Respondents) v. George Wimpey UK Limited and others (Appellants) (Scotland)	[2007] UKHL 18	25 April 2007
Moncrieff and another (Respondents) v. Jamieson and others (Appellants) (Scotland)	[2007] UKHL 42	17 October 2007
OBG Limited and others (Appellants) v. Allan and others (Respondents) Douglas and another and others (Appellants) v. Hello! Limited and others (Respondents) Mainstream Properties Limited (Appellants) v. Young and others and another (Respondents)	[2007] UKHL 21	2 May 2007
O'Brien and others (FC) (Appellants) v. Independent Assessor (Respondent)	[2007] UKHL 10	14 March 2007
Office of Fair Trading (Respondents) v Lloyds TSB Bank plc and others (Appellants) and others (Respondents)	[2007] UKHL 48	31 October 2007
Premium Nafta Products Limited (20th Defendant) and others (Respondents) v. Fili Shipping Company Limited (14th Claimant) and others (Appellants)	[2007] UKHL 40	17 October 2007
R v. Abdroikof (Appellant) and another (On Appeal from the Court of Appeal (Criminal Division)) R v. Abdroikof and another (Appellant) (On Appeal from the Court of Appeal (Criminal Division)) R v. Williamson (Appellant) (On Appeal from the Court of Appeal (Criminal Division))	[2007] UKHL 37	17 October 2007
R v. H (Appellant) (On Appeal from the Court of Appeal (Criminal Division))	[2007] UKHL 7	28 February 2007
R v. Kennedy (On Appeal from the Court of Appeal (Criminal Division))	[2007] UKHL 38	17 October 2007
R (on the application of Al-Jedda) (FC) (Appellant) v Secretary of State for Defence (Respondent)	[2007] UKHL 58	12 December 2007
R (on the application of Countryside Alliance and others and others (Appellants)) v Her Majesty's Attorney General and another (Respondents) R (on the application of Countryside Alliance and others (Appellants) and others) v Her Majesty's Attorney General and another (Respondents) (Conjoined Appeals)	[2007] UKHL 52	28 November 2007
R (on the application of Godmanchester Town Council) (Appellants) v. Secretary of State for the Environment, Food and Rural Affairs (Respondent) and one other action	[2007] UKHL 28	20 June 2007
R (on the application of Hurst) (Respondent) v. Commissioner of Police of the Metropolis (Appellant)	[2007] UKHL 13	28 March 2007
R (on the application of National Grid Gas plc (formerly Transco plc)) (Appellants) v. Environment Agency (Respondents) (Civil Appeal from Her Majesty's High Court of Justice)	[2007] UKHL 30	27 June 2007
R (on the application of Stellato) (Respondent) v. Secretary of State for the Home Department (Appellant)	[2007] UKHL 5	28 February 2007
R v. Rogers (Appellant) (On Appeal from the Court of Appeal (Criminal Division))	[2007] UKHL 8	28 February 2007
J & H Ritchie Limited (Appellants) v. Lloyd Limited (Respondents) (Scotland)	[2007] UKHL 9	7 March 2007
Riverside Housing Association Limited (Appellants) v. White (FC) and another (FC) (Respondents)	[2007] UKHL 20	25 April 2007
Saber (AP) (Appellant) v Secretary of State for the Home Department (Respondent)	[2007] UKHL 57	12 December 2007
St Helens Borough Council (Respondents) v. Derbyshire and others (Appellants)	[2007] UKHL 16	25 April 2007
Seal (FC) (Appellant) v. Chief Constable of South Wales Police (Respondent)	[2007] UKHL 31	4 July 2007
Secretary of State for the Home Department (Appellant) v. AH (Sudan) and others (FC) (Respondents)	[2007] UKHL 49	14 November 2007
Secretary of State for the Home Department (Appellant) v. JJ and others (FC) (Respondents)	[2007] UKHL 45	31 October 2007
Secretary of State for the Home Department v. MB (FC) (Appellant)	[2007] UKHL 46	31 October 2007
Secretary of State for the Home Department Respondent v. E and another (Appellant)	[2007] UKHL 47	31 October 2007
Sempra Metals Limited (formerly Metallgesellschaft Limited) (Respondents) v. Her Majesty's Commissioners of Inland Revenue and another (Appellants)	[2007] UKHL 34	18 July 2007
Somerville (AP) (Original Appellant and Cross-respondent) v. Scottish Ministers (Original Respondents and Cross-appellants) (Scotland) Blanco (AP) (Original Appellant and Cross-respondent) v. Scottish Ministers (Original Respondents and Cross-appellants) (Scotland) Henderson (AP) (Original Appellant and Cross-respondent) v. Scottish Ministers (Original Respondents and Cross-appellants) (Scotland)Ralston (AP) (Original Appellant and Cross-respondent) v. Scottish Ministers (Original Respondents and Cross-appellants) (Scotland)(Consolidated Appeals)	[2007] UKHL 44	24 October 2007
Stack (Appellant) v. Dowden (Respondent)	[2007] UKHL 17	25 April 2007
United Utilities Water plc (Appellants) v. Environment Agency for England and Wales (Respondents)	[2007] UKHL 41	17 October 2007
Ward (AP) (Appellant) v. Police Service of Northern Ireland (Respondents) (Northern Ireland)	[2007] UKHL 50	21 November 2007
Watt (formerly Carter) (sued on his own on behalf of the other members of the Labour Party) (Respondent) v Ahsan (Appellant) v. Ahsan (Apellant)	[2007] UKHL 51	21 November 2007
West Tankers Inc (Respondents) v RAS Riunione Adriatica di Sicurta SpA and others (Appellants)	[2007] UKHL 4	21 February 2007
Whaley and another (Appellant) v Lord Advocate (Respondent) (Scotland)	[2007] UKHL 53	28 November 2007
Wilson (Respondent) v. Jaymarke Estates Limited and another (Appellants) (Scotland)	[2007] UKHL 29	20 June 2007
Yeda Research and Development Company Limited (Appellants) v. Rhone-Poulenc Rorer International Holdings Inc and others (Respondents)	[2007] UKHL 43	24 October 2007
YL (by her litigation friend the Official Solicitor) (FC) (Appellant) v. Birmingham City Council and others (Respondents)	[2007] UKHL 27	20 June 2007

== See also ==
- List of judgments of the House of Lords delivered in 2008
- List of judgments of the House of Lords delivered in 2009
- List of judgments of the Supreme Court of the United Kingdom delivered in 2009
- List of judgments of the House of Lords
- List of landmark judgments of the House of Lords
