= Landmark Cases in the Law of Contract =

2008 legal book

- Publisher: Bloomsbury Publishing
- Publication date: 30 May 2008
- ISBN: 9781841137599

Landmark Cases in the Law of Contract (2008) is a book by Charles Mitchell and Paul Mitchell, which outlines the key cases in English contract law.

== Content ==
The cases discussed are,

- Coggs v Barnard (1703) on bailment
- Pillans v Van Mierop (1765) on the doctrine of consideration
- Carter v Boehm (1766) on good faith
- Da Costa v Jones (1778)
- Hochster v De La Tour (1853) on anticipatory breach
- Smith v Hughes (1871) on unilateral mistake and the objective approach to interpretation of contracts
- Foakes v Beer (1884) on part payments of debt (with a notable dissenting opinion by Lord Blackburn)
- The Hong Kong Fir (1961) on innominate terms, allowing the court remedial flexibility
- Suisse Atlantique Societe d'Armament SA v NV Rotterdamsche Kolen Centrale (1966)
- Rearden Smith Lines Ltd v Yngvar Hansen Tangan or The Diana Prosperity (1976) 1 WLR 989 on a contextual approach to contractual interpretation
- Johnson v Agnew (1979) that damages are to be assessed on the date when a breach can reasonably be discovered neither any cost

== Reception ==
The book received reviews from publications including the Singapore Journal of Legal Studies, The Journal of Legal History, Revue trimestrielle de droit civil, and the Australian Banking and Finance Law Bulletin.

== See also ==
- Landmark case
- Restitution in English law
- Landmark Cases in the Law of Restitution (2006) by Charles Mitchell and Paul Mitchell
- Landmark Cases in the Law of Tort (2010) by Charles Mitchell and Paul Mitchell
- Landmark Cases in Family Law (2011) by Stephen Gilmore, Jonathan Herring and Rebecca Probert
- Landmark Cases in Equity (2012) by Charles Mitchell and Paul Mitchell (6 Jul 2012)
