= Landmark Cases in the Law of Restitution =

Book edited by Charles Mitchell and Paul Mitchell

- Publisher: Bloomsbury Publishing
- Publication date: 18 April 2006
- ISBN: 978-1-84113-588-5

Landmark Cases in the Law of Restitution (2006) is a book edited by Charles Mitchell and Paul Mitchell, which outlines the key cases in English unjust enrichment law and restitution.

== Content ==
The cases discussed are,

- Lampleigh v Brathwait (1615)
- Moses v Macferlan (1760)
- Taylor v Plumer (1815)
- Planche v Colburn (1831)
- Marsh v Keating (1834)
- Erlanger v New Sombrero Phosphate Co (1878)
- Phillips v Homfray (1883)
- Allcard v Skinner (1887)
- Sinclair v Brougham (1914)
- Fibrosa Spolka Akcyjna v Fairbairn Lawson Coombe Barbour Ltd (1942)
- Re Diplock (1948)
- Solle v Butcher (1950)

== Reception ==
Corpus Christi College, Oxford lecturer Tariq A. Baloch wrote in King's Law Journal, "These essays should be read not just by legal historians or restitution lawyers but also those interested in the workings of the common law generally." University of Alberta law professor Mitchell McInnes called the book "a well-told tale of human drama and legal development".

Peter Millett reviewed the book in Law Quarterly Review. David Capper reviewed the book in Restitution Law Review.

== See also ==
- Landmark case
- Restitution in English law
- Landmark Cases in the Law of Contract (2008) by Charles Mitchell and Paul Mitchell
- Landmark Cases in the Law of Tort (2010) by Charles Mitchell and Paul Mitchell
- Landmark Cases in Family Law (2011) by Stephen Gilmore, Jonathan Herring and Rebecca Probert
- Landmark Cases in Equity (2012) by Charles Mitchell and Paul Mitchell (6 Jul 2012)
- Landmark Cases in Land Law (2013) by Nigel Gravells
