= Landmark Cases in the Law of Tort =

2010 legal book

Landmark Cases in the Law of Tort (2010) is a book edited by Charles Mitchell and Paul Mitchell, which outlines the key cases in English tort law.

== Content ==
The cases discussed are,

- R v Pease (1832): Mark Wilde and Charlotte Smith
- Buron v Denman (1848) Charles Mitchell and Leslie Urano
- George v Skivington (1869) David Ibbetson
- Daniel v Metropolitan Railway Company (1871) Michael Lobban
- Woodley v Metropolitan District Railway Company (1877) Steve Banks
- Cavalier v Pope (1906) Richard Baker and Jonathan Garton
- Hedley Byrne & Co Ltd v Heller & Partners Ltd (1963) Paul Mitchell
- Goldman v Hargrave (1967) Mark Lunney
- Tate & Lyle Food & Distribution Ltd v Greater London Council (1983) J. W. Neyers
- Smith v Littlewoods Organisation Ltd (1985) Elspeth Reid
- Alcock v Chief Constable of South Yorkshire Police (1991) Donal Nolan
- Hunter v Canary Wharf Ltd (1997) Maria Lee
- Fairchild v Glenhaven Funeral Services Ltd (2002) Ken Oliphant

== Reception ==
Jörg Fedtke, a law professor at Tulane University, wrote that the book, which is written by Charles Mitchell and Paul Mitchell and 14 contributors, is "a remarkable collection of stimulating and highly nuanced chapters that represent as many different perspectives on tort law as the number of influential cases the authors discuss along the way". Robert H. George reviewed the book in Lloyd's Maritime and Commercial Law Quarterly.

== See also ==
- Landmark case
- Restitution in English law
- Landmark Cases in the Law of Restitution (2006) by Charles Mitchell and Paul Mitchell
- Landmark Cases in the Law of Contract (2008) by Charles Mitchell and Paul Mitchell
- Landmark Cases in Family Law (2011) by Stephen Gilmore, Jonathan Herring and Rebecca Probert
- Landmark Cases in Equity (2012) by Charles Mitchell and Paul Mitchell
- Landmark Cases in Land Law (2013) by Nigel Gravells
