= List of judgments of the House of Lords delivered in 2008 =

This is list of cases heard before the Judicial Committee of the House of Lords in 2008.

Title	Number	Date of Judgment
A (Appellant) v Hoare (Respondent), C (FC) (Appellant) v Middlesbrough Council (Respondents), X (FC) and another (FC) (Appellants) v London Borough of Wandsworth (Respondents) (Conjoined Appeals), H (FC) (Appellant) v Suffolk County Council (Respondents), Young (FC) (Appellant) v Catholic Care (Diocese of Leeds) and others (Respondents)	[2008] UKHL 6	30 January 2008
AL Serbia (FC) (Appellant) v Secretary of State for the Home Department (Respondent) R (On the application of Rudi) (FC) (Appellant) v Secretary of State for the Home Department (Respondent)	[2008] UKHL 42	25 June 2008
Ashley (FC) and another (FC) (Respondents) v Chief Constable of Sussex Police (Appellants)	[2008] UKHL 25	23 April 2008
In re B (Children) (FC)	[2008] UKHL 35	11 June 2008
Beoku-Betts (FC) (Appellant) v Secretary of State for the Home Department (Respondent)	[2008] UKHL 39	25 June 2008
Boss Holdings Limited (Appellants) v Grosvenor West End Properties and others (Respondents)	[2008] UKHL 5	30 January 2008
Bowden (AP) (Appellant) v Poor Sisters of Nazareth (Respondents) and others (Scotland) Whitton (AP) (Appellant) v Poor Sisters of Nazareth (Respondents) and others (Scotland)(Consolidated Appeals)	[2008] UKHL 32	21 May 2008
Caldarelli (Appellant) v Court of Naples (Respondent) (Criminal Appeal from her Majesty’s High Court of Justice)	[2008] UKHL 51	30 July 2008
Brit Syndicates Limited for and on behalf of Brit Syndicate 2987 at Lloyd's for the 2003 year of account and others (Respondents) v Italaudit SpA (in liquidation) (formerly Grant Thornton SpA) and others (Appellants)	[2008] UKHL 18	12 March 2008
Chikwamba (FC) (Appellant) v Secretary of State for the Home Department (Respondent)	[2008] UKHL 40	25 June 2008
Common Services Agency (Appellants) v Scottish Information Commissioner (Respondent) (Scotland)	[2008] UKHL 47	9 July 2008
Conor Medsystems Incorporated (Respondents) v Angiotech Pharmaceuticals Incorporated and others (Appellants)	[2008] UKHL 49	9 July 2008
Corr (Administratix of The Estate of Thomas Corr) (Appellate) v Ibc Vehicles Limited	[2008] UKHL 13	27 January 2008
Crown Prosecution Service (Respondents) v Jennings (Appellant)	[2008] UKHL 29	14 May 2008
Doherty (FC) (Appellant) and others v Birmingham City Council (Respondent)	[2008] UKHL 57	30 July 2008
In re Doherty (Original Respondent and Cross-appellant) (Northern Ireland)	[2008] UKHL 33	11 June 2008
In re Duffy (FC) (Appellant) (Northern Ireland)	[2008] UKHL 4	30 January 2008
Earl Cadogan and others (Respondents) v 26 Cadogan Square Limited (Appellants), Howard de Walden Estates Limited (Respondents) v Aggio and others (Appellants)	[2008] UKHL 44	25 June 2008
Earl Cadogan (Appellant) v Pitts and another (Respondents) and one other action Earl Cadogan and others (Appellants) v Sportelli and another (Respondents) and two other actions	[2008] UKHL 71	10 December 2008
EB Kosovo (FC) (Appellant) v Secretary of State for the Home Department (Respondent)	[2008] UKHL 41	25 June 2008
EM (Lebanon) (FC) (Appellant) v Secretary of State for the Home Department (Respondent)	[2008] UKHL 64	22 October 2008
Fleming (t/a Bodycraft) (Respondent) v Her Majesty's Revenue and Customs (Appellants) Conde Nast Publications Limited (Respondents) v Her Majesty's Revenue and Customs (Appellants)	[2008] UKHL 2	23 January 2008
Gallagher (Valuation Officer) (Respondent) v Church of Jesus Christ of Latter-day saints (Appellants)	[2008] UKHL 56	30 July 2008
Helow (AP) (Appellant) v Secretary of State for the Home Department and another (Respondents) (Scotland)	[2008] UKHL 62	22 October 2008
In re Hilali (Respondent) (application for a writ of Habeas Corpus)	[2008] UKHL 3	30 January 2008
Kay (FC) v Commissioner of Police of The Metropolis	[2008] UKHL 69	26 November 2008
Knowsley Housing Trust (Respondents) v White (FC) (Appellant) Honeygan-Green (Respondent) vLondon Borough of Islington (Appellants) Porter (FC) (Appellant) v Shepherds Bush Housing Association (Respondents)	[2008] UKHL 70	10 December 2008
Maco Door and Windows Hardware (UK) Limited (Respondents) v Her Majesty's Revenue and Customs (Appellants)	[2008] UKHL 54	30 July 2008
Majorstake Limited (Respondents) v Curtis (Appellant)	[2008] UKHL 10	6 February 2008
In re E (a child) (AP) (Appellant) (Northern Ireland)	[2008] UKHL 66	12 November 2008
In re Maye (AP) (Appellant) (Northern Ireland)	[2008] UKHL 9	6 February 2008
Mayor and Burgesses of the London Borough of Lewisham (Appellants) v Malcolm (Respondent)	[2008] UKHL 43	25 June 2008
McGrath and another (Appellants) and others v Riddell and others (Respondents) McGrath and another and others (Appellants) v Riddell and others (Respondents) (Conjoined Appeals)	[2008] UKHL 21	9 April 2008
McKinnon (Appellant) v Government of the United States of America (Respondents) and another	[2008] UKHL 59	30 July 2008
Norris (Appellant) v Judgments - Government of the United States of America and others (Respondent) (Criminal Appeal from Her Majesty's High Court of Justice)	[2008] UKHL 16	12 March 2008
OB (by his mother and litigation friend) (FC) (Respondent) v Aventis Pasteur SA (Appellants)	[2008] UKHL 34	11 June 2008
In re P and others (AP) (Appellants) (Northern Ireland)	[2008] UKHL 38	18 June 2008
Phillips and Another (suing as administrators of the estate of Christo Michailidis) V Symes and Others	[2008] UKHL 1	23 January 2008
Pilecki (Appellant) v Circuit Court of Legnica, Poland (Respondents) (Criminal Appeal from Her Majesty's High Court of Justice)	[2008] UKHL 7	6 February 2008
Principal and Fellows of Newnham College in the University of Cambridge (Respondents) v Her Majesty's Revenue and Customs (Appellants)	[2008] UKHL 23	16 April 2008
R v Asfaw (Appellant) (On Appeal from the Court of Appeal (Criminal Division))	[2008] UKHL 31	21 May 2008
R v Chargot Limited (t/a Contract Services) and others (Appellants) (On appeal from the Court of Appeal Criminal Division)	[2008] UKHL 73	10 December 2008
R v Clarke (Appellant) (On Appeal from the Court of Appeal (Criminal Division)) R v McDaid (Appellant) (On Appeal from the Court of Appeal (Criminal Division))(Consolidated Appeals)	[2008] UKHL 8	6 February 2008
R v Davis (Appellant) (On appeal from the Court of Appeal (Criminal Division))	[2008] UKHL 36	18 June 2008
R v G (Appellant) (On appeal from the Court of Appeal (Criminal Division))	[2008] UKHL 37	18 June 2008
R v GG plc and others (Appellants) and others and others (Appellants) (On Appeal from the Court of Appeal (Criminal Division))	[2008] UKHL 17	12 March 2008
R v May (Appellant) (On Appeal from the Court of Appeal (Criminal Division))	[2008] UKHL 28	14 May 2008
R v Rahman and others (Appellants) (On Appeal from the Court of Appeal (Criminal Division))	[2008] UKHL 45	2 July 2008
R v Green (Appellant) (On Appeal from the Court of Appeal (Criminal Division))	[2008] UKHL 30	14 May 2008
R (On The Application of Animal Defenders International) V Secretary of State For Culture, Media and Sport (Respondent)	[2008] UKHL 15	12 March 2008
R (On The Application of Baiai and Others) V Secretary of State For The Home Department	[2008] UKHL 53	30 July 2008
R (on the application of Bancoult) Respondent v Secretary of State for Foreign and Commonwealth Affairs (Appellant)	[2008] UKHL 61	22 October 2008
R (on the application of Bapio Action Limited and another) (Respondents) v Secretary of State for the Home Department and another (Appellant)	[2008] UKHL 27	30 April 2008
R (on the application of Corner House Research and others) (Respondents) v Director of the Serious Fraud Office (Appellant) (Criminal Appeal from Her Majesty's High Court of Justice)	[2008] UKHL 60	30 July 2008
R (on the application of Edwards and another (Appellant)) v Environment Agency and others (Respondents)	[2008] UKHL 22	16 April 2008
R (on the application of Gentle (FC) and another (FC)) (Appellants) v The Prime Minister and others (Respondents)	[2008] UKHL 20	9 April 2008
R (on the application of Heffernan (FC)) (Appellant) v The Rent Service (Respondents)	[2008] UKHL 58	30 July 2008
R (on the application of JL) v Secretary of State For Justice (Appellant)	[2008] UKHL 68	26 November 2008
R (on the application of M) (FC)(Appellant) v Her Majesty's Treasury (Respondents) and two other actions	[2008] UKHL 26	30 April 2008
R (On The Application of M) (FC) V London Borough of Hammersmith and Fulham Appellate Committee	[2008] UKHL 14	27 February 2008
R (on the application of M) (FC) (Respondent) v Slough Borough Council (Appellants)	[2008] UKHL 52	30 July 2008
R (on the application of RJM) (FC) (Appellant) v Secretary of State for Work and Pensions (Respondent)	[2008] UKHL 63	22 October 2008
R (On the Application of Wellington) (FC) (Appellant) v Secretary of State for the Home Department (Respondent) (Criminal Appeal from Her Majesty's High Court of Justice)	[2008] UKHL 72	10 December 2008
Reinwood Limited (Respondents) v L Brown & Sons Limited (Appellants)	[2008] UKHL 12	20 February 2008
Savage (Respondent) v South Essex Partnership NHS Foundation Trust (Appellate)	[2008] UKHL 74	10 December 2008
Scottish & Newcastle International Limited (Respondents) v Othon Ghalanos Limited (a company incorporated in Cyprus) (Appellants)	[2008] UKHL 11	20 February 2008
Scottish & Newcastle International Limited (Respondents) v Othon Ghalanos Limited (a company incorporated in Cyprus) (Appellants)	[2008] UKHL 11	20 February 2008
Scottish & Newcastle plc (Original Respondents and Cross-appellants) v Raguz (Original Appellant and Cross-respondent)	[2008] UKHL 65	29 October 2008
Simmers (Respondent) v Innes (Appellant) (Scotland)	[2008] UKHL 24	16 April 2008
Spencer-Franks (Appellant) v Kellogg Brown and Root Limited and others (Respondents) (Scotland)	[2008] UKHL 46	2 July 2008
Total Network SL (a company incorporated in Spain) (Original Respondents and Cross-appellants) v Her Majesty's Revenue and Customs (suing as Commissioners of Customs and Excise) (Original Appellants and Cross-respondents)	[2008] UKHL 19	12 March 2008
Transfield Shipping Inc (Appellants) v Mercator Shipping Inc (Respondents)	[2008] UKHL 48	9 July 2008
Chief Constable of The Hertfordshire Police (Original Appellant and Cross-Respondent) V Van Colle	[2008] UKHL 50	30 July 2008
Yeoman's Row Management Limited (Appellants) and another v Cobbe (Respondent)	[2008] UKHL 55	30 July 2008
Zalewska (Ap) (Appellant) v Department for Social Development (Respondents) (Northern Ireland)	[2008] UKHL 67	12 November 2008

== See also ==
- List of judgments of the House of Lords delivered in 2009
- List of judgments of the Supreme Court of the United Kingdom delivered in 2009
- List of judgments of the House of Lords
- List of landmark judgments of the House of Lords
