= 1893 in the United Kingdom =

Events from the year 1893 in the United Kingdom.

== Incumbents ==
- Monarch – Victoria
- Prime Minister – William Ewart Gladstone (Liberal)

== Events ==
- 13 January – The Independent Labour Party has its first meeting, in Bradford, under chairman Keir Hardie.
- 30 January – Old Head coinage introduced.
- 11–19 February – White Star Line SS Naronic sinks without trace in heavy seas on the Liverpool–New York transatlantic passage.
- 10 March – The Government takes control of Uganda from the British East Africa Company.
- 10 May – Colony of Natal given self-governing status.
- 6 June – Wedding of Prince George, Duke of York, and Princess Mary of Teck at St James's Palace in London.
- 13 June – The first British Ladies Amateur Golf Championship is held, at the Royal Lytham & St Annes Golf Club.
- 22 June – HMS Victoria, flagship of the Mediterranean Fleet, collides with HMS Camperdown and sinks in ten minutes, Vice-Admiral Sir George Tryon going down with it.
- 29 June – Unveiling of the Shaftesbury Memorial Fountain (with its statue of Anteros), designed by Alfred Gilbert, at Piccadilly Circus in London.
- 4 July – An underground explosion at Combs Pit, Thornhill, West Yorkshire, kills 135.
- 12 July – Dundee F.C. is formed in Scotland.
- 10 August – Preston, Lancashire, enters the United Kingdom weather records with the highest five-minute total rainfall of 32mm. As of August 2018, this record remains.
- 6 September – Isinglass completes the English Triple Crown by finishing first in the Epsom Derby, 2,000 Guineas and St Leger.
- 7 September – Featherstone 'Massacre': troops fire on locked-out Yorkshire coal miners, killing two.
- 22 September – Elementary Education (School Attendance) Act leads to raising of school leaving age in England and Wales to eleven years.
- 13 October – The first students enter St Hilda's College, Oxford, founded for women by Dorothea Beale.
- 28 October – The Royal Navy's first destroyer, HMS Havock, undergoes sea trials.
- 26 November – Arthur Conan Doyle surprises the reading public by revealing in the story "The Adventure of the Final Problem", published in the December issue of The Strand Magazine, that his character Sherlock Holmes had apparently died at the Reichenbach Falls on 4 May 1891.
- 28 November – Law case of Browne v Dunn is decided in the House of Lords, a leading case on the conduct of legal cross-examination.
- 30 November – University of Wales incorporated by Royal charter.
- 5 December – Married Women's Property Act 1893 completes the 19th century process of equalizing property rights for women and men.
- 16 December – Establishment, in Yorkshire, of the Brontë Society, possibly the oldest literary society of this nature, dedicated to establishing what will become the Brontë Parsonage Museum.

=== Undated ===
- W. Britain invents a process of producing hollow cast lead toy soldiers.
- The University of Exeter Debating Society is founded in England as the Exeter Debating Society at the Royal Albert Memorial College.
- The village of Bermuda, Warwickshire, is built.
- Dulwich Hamlet F.C. is founded in London.

== Publications ==
- Arthur Conan Doyle's novel The Refugees.
- Beatrice Harraden's novel Ships That Pass in the Night.
- Stanley J. Weyman's novel A Gentleman of France.

== Births ==
- 12 February – Tom Stephenson, rambler (died 1987)
- 15 January – Ivor Novello, actor and musician (died 1951)
- 5 February – W. E. Johns, writer, creator of Biggles (died 1968)
- 3 March – Ivon Hitchens, painter (died 1979)
- 18 March – Wilfred Owen, soldier and poet (died 1918)
- 3 April – Leslie Howard, film actor (died 1943)
- 9 April – Victor Gollancz, publisher (died 1967)
- 8 May – Teddy Wakelam, English rugby player and sportscaster (died 1963)
- 13 June – Dorothy L. Sayers, author (died 1957)
- 30 June – Harold Laski, political theorist and economist (died 1950)
- 9 July – George Geary, cricketer (died 1981)
- 20 July – George Llewelyn-Davies, one of the 'Lost Boys' who inspired Peter Pan (died 1915)
- 22 August – Wilfred Kitching, 7th General of The Salvation Army (died 1977)
- 7 September – Leslie Hore-Belisha, statesman after whom Belisha beacons are named (died 1957)
- 15 October – Saunders Lewis, Welsh nationalist poet, dramatist and critic (died 1985)
- 21 December – Winifred Nicholson, born Rosa Roberts, impressionist painter (died 1981)
- 23 December – Sholto Douglas, Marshal of the Royal Air Force (died 1969)

== Deaths ==
- 2 January – John O. Westwood, entomologist (born 1805)
- 15 January – Fanny Kemble, actress (born 1809)
- 23 January – William Price, Welsh physician and radical, pioneer of cremation (born 1800)
- 22 February – Lydia Irving, philanthropist, prison visitor (born 1797)
- 18 September – Charles Clay, surgeon (born 1801)
- 18 November – Robert Grosvenor, 1st Baron Ebury, politician (born 1801)
- 11 December – William Milligan, Scottish theologian (born 1821)
