= List of judgments of the House of Lords =

These are lists of cases heard before the Judicial Committee of the House of Lords until it was replaced by the Supreme Court of the United Kingdom in October 2009.

- List of judgments of the House of Lords delivered before 1996
- List of judgments of the House of Lords delivered in 1996
- List of judgments of the House of Lords delivered in 1997
- List of judgments of the House of Lords delivered in 1998
- List of judgments of the House of Lords delivered in 1999
- List of judgments of the House of Lords delivered in 2000
- List of judgments of the House of Lords delivered in 2001
- List of judgments of the House of Lords delivered in 2002
- List of judgments of the House of Lords delivered in 2003
- List of judgments of the House of Lords delivered in 2004
- List of judgments of the House of Lords delivered in 2005
- List of judgments of the House of Lords delivered in 2006
- List of judgments of the House of Lords delivered in 2007
- List of judgments of the House of Lords delivered in 2008
- List of judgments of the House of Lords delivered in 2009

== See also ==
- List of landmark judgements of the House of Lords
