= Re Dolphin's Conveyance =

English land law case

Re Dolphin’s Conveyance
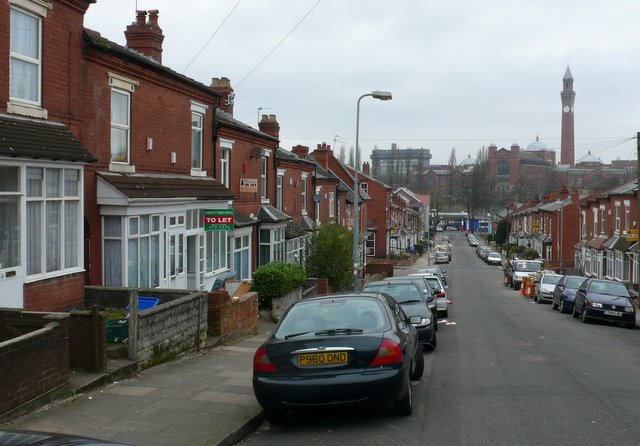
- A street of houses in Selly Oak, Birmingham. The question was whether more intensive development was covenant-barred, unless later released. The question was decided in the affirmative.
- Court: High Court
- Full case name: Birmingham Corpn v Boden
- Citations: [1970] Ch 654 [1970] 3 WLR 31 [1970] 2 All ER 664, Ch D

Case history
- Prior action: none
- Subsequent action: none

Court membership
- Judge sitting: Mr Justice Stamp

Keywords
- Covenants

Re Dolphin's Conveyance [1970] Ch 654 is an English land law case, concerning covenants. The general legal requirement for a building scheme to exist to enable constrain certain types of development on adjoining land was on the facts satisfied as the multiple vendors were in fact common beneficiaries selling on identical legal terms and no drawing of a cogent estate plan was here necessary.

== Facts ==
Robert Dolphin, owner of Selly Hill Estate, Birmingham, died and the plots were sold in nine conveyances. The first four by his sisters, the last five by his nephew, all on the same legal terms, with covenants about the house type to be built on each plot. These sellers covenanted they would impose similar covenants on the other sale of plots. The current owner, a subsequent owner of one of the houses, wished to redevelop in breach of covenants and asked the Court whether they were enforceable.

== Judgment ==
Stamp J held that even though there was no common vendor and the estate had not been laid out prior to sale, there was a building scheme created.

== Cases cited ==
=== Applied ===
- Baxter v Four Oaks Properties Ltd [1965] Ch 816; [1965] 2 WLR 1115; [1965] 1 All ER 906, Ch D

=== Distinguished ===
- White v Bijou Mansions Ltd [1938] Ch 351, CA
- Elliston v Reacher [1908] 2 Ch 665, CA

== See also ==
- English land law
- English trusts law
- English property law
- Wrotham Park Estate Co Ltd v Parkside Homes Ltd
