= Phillips v Homfray =

English court case

Phillips v Homfray is an important landmark decision in English law of restitution.

The court case lasted 20 years, and was complicated by the death of one of the defendants. It involved a matter in which the defendant had committed a trespass to land of his neighbor by tunneling under the plaintiffs' land and mining coal from it.

Joseph and John Phillips owned a farm of 116 acres, in Monmouthshire. Unbeknownst to them their neighbours, the Tredegar Iron Company, extracted 2000 tons of coal from under their farm The plaintiff sought in equity an account of profits, and rent for the use of the subterranean portion of their property.

The Court of Appeal eventually found for the plaintiff, and ordered an inquiry into the value of the coal that had been mined by the defendant. This inquiry was delayed for some years. The Court ruled for restoration of the wrongfully appropriated profits. The court eventually concluded that the plaintiff could sue the deceased's estate, but only granted the first of the sought remedies.

The decision became precedent in Australia with the decision in Waddell v Ross and Finlay v Chrney a decision given by Charles Bowen LJ who delivered the majority decision in Phillips v Homfray.

A second appeal was launched to secure an account of the profits from Fothergill's land. The defense rested on the rule Actio personalis moritur cum persona. Citing dicta from Hambly v. Trott the King's Bench court held that the only action that died with the defendant was actions where the defendant had caused a loss to the plaintiff. In this case the damages weren't for injury to the plaintiff but for the return of goods, and also because the defendant's estate had benefited from the extraction of the coal; the estate itself had become a beneficiary and so was liable for the return of the profits.

== See also ==
- Restitution in English law
- Landmark Cases in the Law of Restitution
- Hambly v. Trott
