= Timworth =

Village in Suffolk, England

Coordinates: 52.289°N 0.727°E

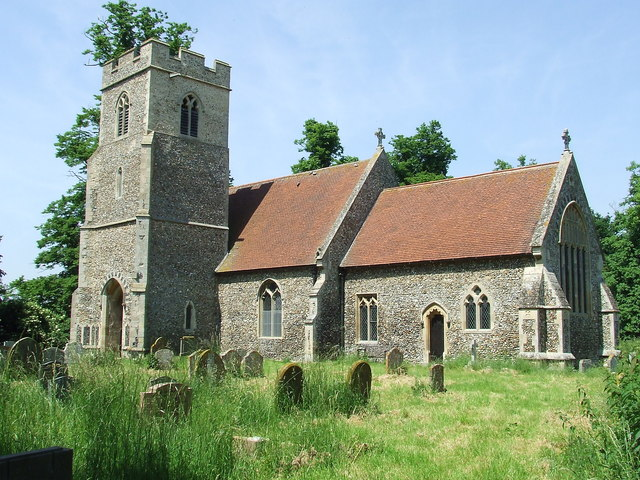
- St Andrew's church, Timworth

- Location within Suffolk
- Area: 2.148 sq mi (5.56 km^{2})
- Population: 50
  - Density: 23/sq mi (8.9/km^{2})
- District: West Suffolk district
- Shire county: Suffolk
- Region: East
- Country: England
- Sovereign state: United Kingdom
- Post town: Bury St Edmunds
- Postcode district: IP31
- Dialling code: 01284
- Police: Suffolk
- Fire: Suffolk
- Ambulance: East of England
- UK Parliament: Bury St Edmunds and Stowmarket

Timworth is a village and civil parish 65 mi (105 km) north east of London and 26 mi (42 km) east of Cambridge in the West Suffolk district of Suffolk in eastern England. Located around two miles north of Bury St Edmunds, its 2005 population was 50. At the 2011 Census the population was included in Ampton.

== History ==
The village name is Old English for 'Tima's Enclosure' and was mentioned in the Doomesday Book as Timeworda located in the hundred of Thedwastre.

The Domesday Book records the population of Timworth in 1086 as 38 households along with six acres of meadows. The land was held by Bury St Edmunds Abbey and Richard fitz Gilbert, before the Norman conquest of England the lands were held by the Abbey and Wihtgar son of Aelfric.

Around the year 1200 a windmill situated in the village was given to the Abbey of Bury St Edmunds by the previous owner Reginald of Groton and his wife Amicia.

John of Timworth served as Abbot of Bury St Edmunds between 1379 and 1389. His election to the abbacy was documented in Electio Johannis Tyworth by the Abbey almoner John Gosnold. This also covered the Peasants' Revolt which was exacerbated in the town by the election as his opponent, Edmund Bromfield, the papal nominee was supported by the townsfolk where as John was the Abbey's candidate.

There are two listed buildings in the parish; the grade II listed Green Farmhouse and the grade II* listed Church of St Andrew.

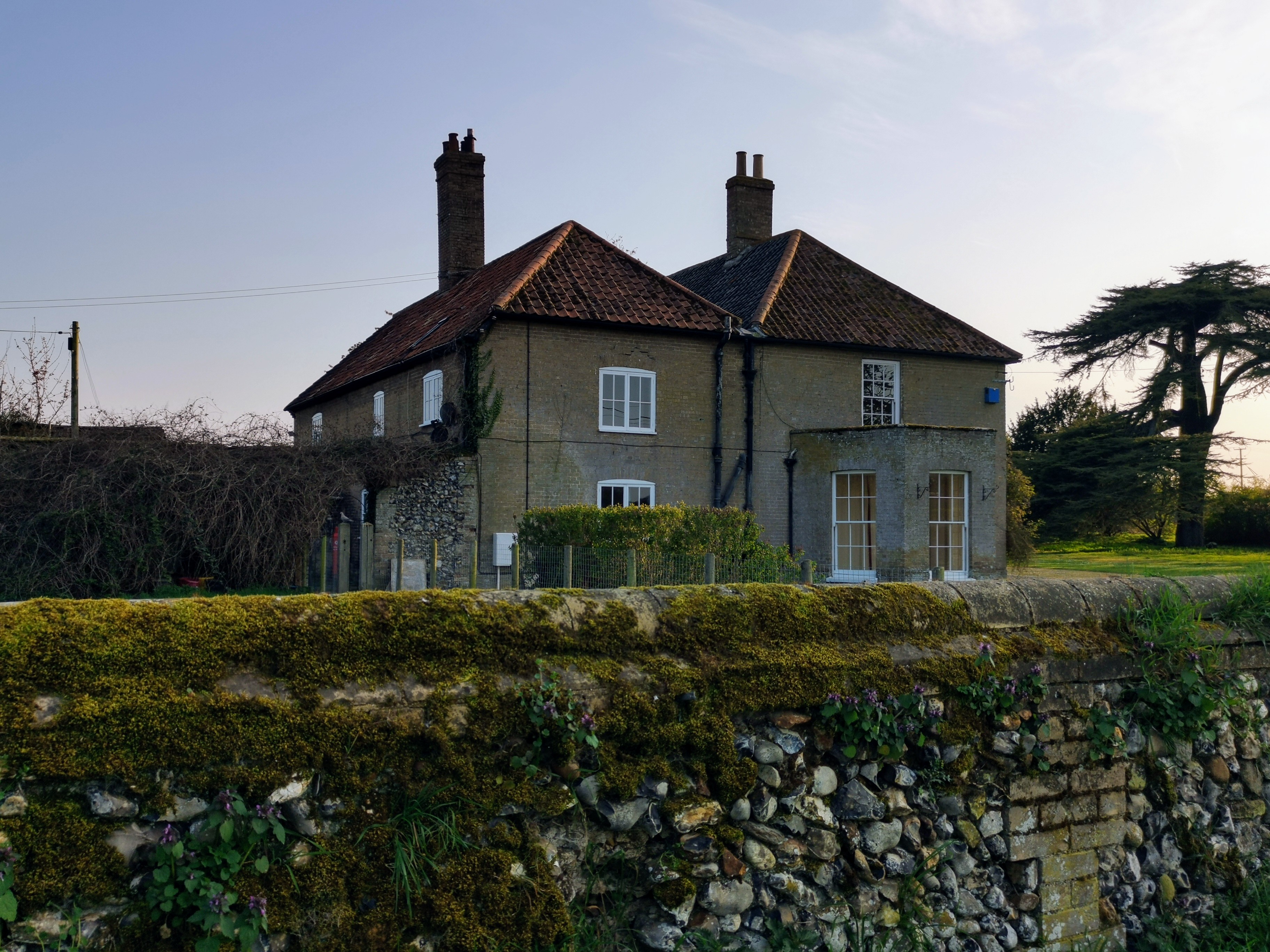
Grade II listed Green Farmhouse

=== Prosecutions for gleaning ===
Over the harvests of 1785–1787, conflict escalated between land owners and gleaners in the village. The first case was brought against Timworth shoemaker Benjamin Manning, by farmer John Worlledge in 1786, who gleaned in neighbouring Ingham. The court held that the defendant was not an inhabitant of the parish in which he gleaned, and was not entitled to the gleaning support. The court therefore decided that a stranger had no right to glean. Worlledge was awarded £26 in damages. The main advocate for the gleaners was Capel Lofft, Justice of the Peace, who had recently inherited the nearby halls at Stanton and Troston.

The second and more widely impacting case came in 1788 when Mary Houghton, the wife of James a shoemaker and one of Timworth's last remaining freeholders, gleaned on the farm of James Steel, who subsequently sued for trespass. The court found in favour of Steel awarding him £35 5s, and ruled that no person has a right at common law to glean the harvest of a private field. The judgement was taken to be a more general precedent for private land matters. The case was widely reported and became known as The Great Gleaning Case. The subsequent debts and hardship that the case brought to the Houghtons forced them to twice mortgage then in 1796 auction their smallholding, which was one of the few remaining parts of the Culford estate parishes not yet under the control of the 1st Marquess Cornwallis. Its purchase almost certainly enabled him to complete the enclosure process and to bring to fruition his family's long-term plans to make it a closed parish and classic estate village.

=== Historical writings ===
In 1870–72, John Marius Wilson's Imperial Gazetteer of England and Wales described the village as

TIMWORTH, a parish in Thingoe district, Suffolk; 3 miles N of Bury-St. Edmunds r. station. Post town, Bury-St. Edmunds. Acres, 1,358. Real property, £1,517. Pop., 222. Houses, 45. The living is a rectory, annexed to Ingham. The church is good.

In 1887, John Bartholomew also wrote an entry on Timworth in the Gazetteer of the British Isles with a much shorter description:

Timworth, par., Suffolk, 3 miles N. of Bury St Edmunds, 1358 ac., pop. 179.

== Notable residents ==
- Edward Ward, clergyman and cricketer
