= Leanne Cullen-Unsworth =

British marine scientist

- Born: 1979 (age 46–47); United Kingdom
- Education: Newcastle University; Bangor University; University of Essex
- Occupation: marine biologist
- Employer: Project Seagrass
- Known for: Seagrass

Leanne Cullen-Unsworth born Leanne Cullen (born 1979) is a British marine scientist. She is mainly known for her work on the preservation of seagrass meadows, which are responsible for supporting the food supply of hundreds of millions of people. In 2024 she was included as one of the BBC's 100 most influential women.

== Life ==
Cullen-Unsworth completed her doctorate in 2007 at Essex University before she went to Australia for post-doctoral research funded by the Commonwealth Scientific and Industrial Research Organisation (CSIRO). She had taken her first degree at Newcastle University in marine biology before studying for a related Master's degree at Bangor University.

She says that she and Richard Unsworth were both doing research in Indonesia focussing on mangroves and corals, when she discovered that seagrasses were very important supporting life that was the main supply of protein for local families. This redicrected their research. In time one of their colleagues, Benjamin Jones, laid the foundations for what is now the international NGO (and UK charity) Project Seagrass.

She argued in 2017 that sea-grasses may be good for supporting sea-horses but the argument was more essential that this "fluffy" approach suggested. Sea-grasses do support sea horses but they are important resources for the fishing industry. In 2018 she was the prime author of a paper in Science calling for action to protect seagrass. She is also quoted for noting that in the UK, seagrasses are sometimes removed from beaches so that they look more picturesque, even though they are a valuable part of the ecosystem.

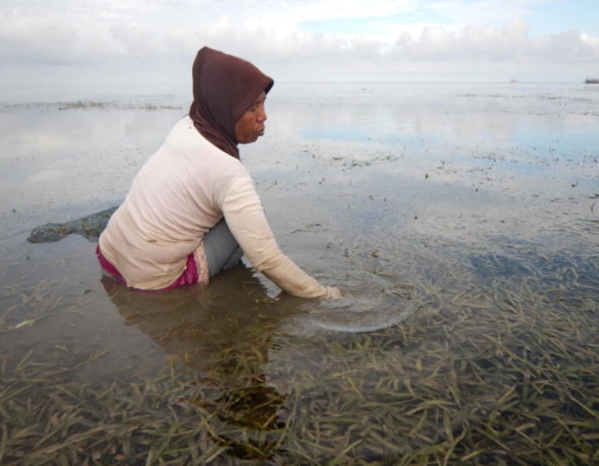
Gleaning in an Indonesian seagrass meadow

She contributed to research that found that seagrasses are important for a type of gleaning i.e. "fishing with basic gear, including bare hands, in shallow water not deeper than that one can stand". The research was published ith an open license allowing it to be re-used without permission bubject only to attribution. Invertebrate gleaning (walking) fisheries for Invertebrates are common within intertidal seagrass meadows, contributing to the food supply of hundreds of millions of people.

In 2018 she was also an author of a paper which warned of the effect of environmental damage caused by British sewerage.

In 2024 she was identified as one of the BBC's 100 most influential women. She was Project Seagrasses' CEO. The BBC highlighted her key role in co-founding Project Seagrass and the use of underwater robots to plant seeds that can grow into new seagrass. Project Seagrass were in talks with the Welsh government who had included their work in their conservation plans.
