= Actio personalis moritur cum persona =

Latin expression

Actio personalis moritur cum persona is a Latin expression meaning "a personal right of action dies with the person".

== Effect of the maxim ==
Some legal causes of action can survive the death of the claimant or plaintiff, for example actions founded in contract law. However, some actions are personal to the plaintiff, defamation of character being one notable example. Therefore, such an action, where it relates to the private character of the plaintiff, comes to an end on his death, whereas an action for the publication of a false and malicious statement which causes damage to the plaintiff's personal estate will survive to the benefit of his or her personal representatives.

The principle also exists to protect the estate and executors from liability for strictly personal acts of the deceased, such as charges for fraud.

== Origins of the maxim ==
It has been argued by academics and acknowledged by the courts that notwithstanding the Latinate form in which the proposition is expressed its origins are less antiquated. It has been described by one Lord Chancellor (Viscount Simon) as:

...not in fact the source from which a body of law has been deduced, but a confusing expression, framed in the solemnity of the Latin tongue, in which the effect of death upon certain personal torts was inaccurately generalised.

The maxim is first quoted in a case (Note: Y.B. 12 Hen. VII, T. f. 22, pl. 2) from 1496, where a woman against whom a defamation judgment was issued died before paying the damages and costs.

The Kings Bench first used the maxim in Cleymond v Vincent (1523) but it was popularised by Edward Coke, with cases like Pinchons Case (1616), and Bane's Case, and to some extent with Slade's Case. (1605)

Judicial discussions of the term followed Pinchon's case in Hambly v Trott and later Phillips v Homfray.

In England, the Law Reform (Miscellaneous Provisions) Act 1934 effectively overturned this rule for all actions in tort except defamation. Other common law jurisdictions have also passed legislation overturning or strongly limiting the rule.

== See also ==
- List of Latin phrases
