= Society of St. Andrew =

Methodist humanitarian organization

Society of Saint Andrew
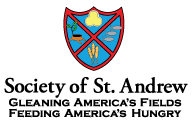
- Abbreviation: SoSA
- Founded: 1979; 47 years ago
- Tax ID no.: 54-1285793
- Legal status: 501(c)(3) nonprofit organization
- Headquarters: Big Island, Virginia, U.S.
- Executive Director: Lynette Johnson
- Revenue: $56,616,033 (2021)
- Expenses: $54,916,437 (2021)
- Employees: 55+ (2021)
- Website: endhunger.org

The Society of St. Andrew (SoSA) is a United Methodist hunger-relief nonprofit focusing on food wastage and poverty-induced starvation. The organization takes produce donations and serves them in SoSA-run distribution programs such as the Gleaning Network, Harvest of Hope, and the Seed Potato Project.

Gleaning is the Biblical practice of hand-gathering crops left in the fields after harvest. Society of St. Andrew staff coordinate volunteers, growers, and distribution agencies to provide food based on said practice, as their produce is mostly donated from farmers.

== Program services ==
As part of the Society of St. Andrew's gleaning programs, fresh fruit and vegetables, particularly potatoes, are gathered and distributed. A number of Bible study programs and seasonal devotions are also organized by the society.

The Society of St. Andrew bases their methodology on the practice of stewardship, stating that 93% of their funds are directly invested in hunger relief. SoSA states that they have salvaged over 500 million pounds of produce since the Society of St. Andrew began its gleaning and salvage operations in 1983, with a purported average meal cost of $0.02 when including overhead expenses.

== Programs ==
SoSA's volunteer network is organized into three main programs: the Potato Project, the Gleaning Network, and Harvest of Hope.

=== Potato Project ===
The Potato Project is a potato salvaging program of the Society of St. Andrew. Collecting unsold potatoes, the Potato Project redirects 45,000-pound loads of produce to soup kitchens, Native American reservations, food pantries, low income housing areas, local churches, and other hunger agencies for distribution to the poor.

As the produce is donated, the Society of St. Andrew pays solely for the transportation and packaging of the food, with a per-pound cost of roughly $0.06. SoSA programs operate on individual donations, church donations, and foundation grants.

=== Gleaning Network ===
The Gleaning Network is a program wherein Society of St. Andrew volunteers collect food from affiliated farmers. These programs draw volunteers from churches, synagogues, scout troops, senior citizen groups, and other organizations. Several thousand pounds of produces are salvaged yearly by volunteers.

Food salvaged in gleaning programs is usually distributed within 48 hours of harvest. According to the Society of St. Andrew, the Gleaning Network has roughly 30,000 participants yearly and harvests 1.5 million pounds of produce. The Society of St. Andrew has staff Gleaning Network coordinators and volunteer coordinators in several states. Volunteering can take place over a single morning or for many years of service.

=== Harvest of Hope ===
Harvest of Hope is the ecumenical study, worship, and action mission trip program run by the Society of St. Andrew.

At Harvest of Hope, participants work in fields gleaning food, study hunger-related issues, and participate in Christian worship. Events organized by Harvest of Hope take place throughout the year, involving week-long or weekend youth retreats run by the Society of St. Andrew and their parent sponsors.

== Locations ==
In addition to its national headquarters in Big Island, Virginia, the Society of St. Andrew operates regional offices in Alabama, Delmarva peninsula, Florida, Georgia, Indiana, Mississippi, North Carolina, Ohio, Tennessee, and Virginia. These offices coordinate the regional gleaning networks that cover much of these states and are responsible for all of The Society of St. Andrew's operations within their respective states.

== History ==
The Society of St. Andrew was started by Rev. Ken Horne and Rev. Ray Buchanan, two United Methodist ministers, concerned with world hunger. In 1979, the two ministers were granted "a special appointment beyond the local church" by then Virginia Conference Bishop, Kenneth Goodson, allowing them to found The Society of St. Andrew in Big Island, Virginia.

For the next five years, the two pastors and their families lived communally, and sustained themselves by growing their own produce and raising animals. At the same time, the two pastors lead workshops on lifestyle and hunger issues.

During one such workshop at Franktown United Methodist Church on the Eastern Shore of Virginia, a farmer questioned Horne and Buchanan about statistics they presented regarding food waste, leading to the creation of the Potato and Produce Project. On June 3, 1983, a farmer from Chadbourn, North Carolina, donated a tractor-trailer load of sweet potatoes to the Society of St. Andrew. This first load of salvaged sweet potatoes was delivered to the Central Virginia Food Bank in Richmond, Virginia.

Originally the ministry operated out of a converted sheepshed on the farm in Big Island. A new building was constructed in 1990 to house the growing ministry. Also in 1990, as an offshoot of the Potato and Produce Project, The Society of St. Andrew began the Seed Potato Project to encourage produce growing in low-income neighborhoods.

In 1985, the Society of St. Andrew launched Harvest of Hope, a youth-oriented field gleaning and study camp. The first event was held at Camp Occahannock-on-the-Bay, on Virginia's Eastern Shore, and was led by Rev. Rhonda VanDyke Colby. As more people were exposed to gleaning, participants introduced the practice to their respective churches. As a result, the Gleaning Network was established in Virginia in 1988. Since then, gleaning has expanded dramatically.

Since 1992, the Society of St. Andrew has expanded into other states in the form of regional offices and gleaning ministries.
