= Worlledge v Manning =

1786 English legal decision supporting property rights

Worlledge v Manning (1786)
- Court: House of Lords
- Decided: May 1786
- Citations: East, 26 Geo. 3. C.B.; 126 ER 34

Keywords
- gleaning property law

Worlledge v Manning (1786) East, 26 Geo. 3 CB; 126 ER 34 is a landmark judgment in English law by the House of Lords and was formative to the modern legal understanding of private property rights.

A precedent for gleaning is to be found in the Bible at Leviticus 19:9-10.

The matter related to gleaners' rights and arose from a disagreement about gleaning during the 1785 harvest. After the barley crop had been cut and cleared, a Timworth shoemaker, Benjamin Manning, had gone onto the land of John Worlledge, the richest farmer, in the adjoining parish of Ingham, Suffolk to glean and had carried away a quantity of barley. Worlledge disputed his right to do so and brought an action for trespass in the Court of Common Pleas. The court decided in Worlledge's favour in May 1786 and awarded him damages and costs.

The court held that the defendant was not an inhabitant of the parish in which he gleaned, and was not entitled to the gleaning support. The Court therefore decided that a stranger had no right to glean.

This was the first time that gleaners’ rights had been challenged and it served as a precedent and possible catalyst for the landmark case Steel v Houghton a year later.

In a separate matter, Manning attempted to prosecute Worlledge for assault at the Suffolk quarter sessions court.

== See also ==
- Steel v Houghton (1788)
