= Henry Manisty =

Sir Henry Manisty
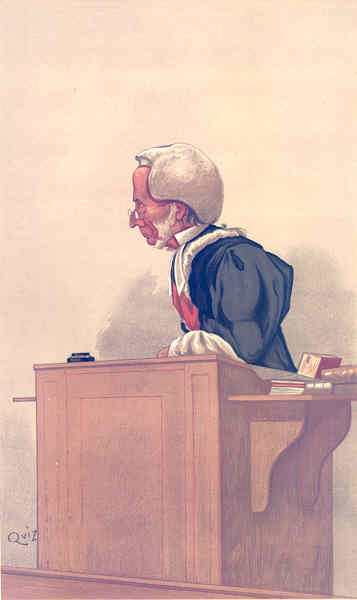

Justice of the High Court
- In office 31 October 1876 – 31 January 1890
- Preceded by: Sir Colin Blackburn
- Succeeded by: Sir Roland Vaughan Williams

Personal details
- Born: 13 December 1808 Edlingham, Northumberland
- Died: 31 January 1890 (aged 81) London
- Children: 7

Sir Henry Manisty (13 December 1808 – 31 January 1890) was an English barrister and judge.

== Life ==
Manisty was born at Vicarage House, Edlingham, Northumberland, the second son of James Manisty, BD, vicar of Edlingham, and his wife Eleanor, only daughter of Francis Forster of Seaton Burn Hall, Northumberland. He was educated at Durham Cathedral grammar school, and was articled when still young in the offices of Thorpe & Dickson, attorneys, of Alnwick, Northumberland.

Manisty was admitted a solicitor in 1830, and practised for twelve years as a member of the firm of Meggison, Pringle, & Manisty, of 3 King's Road, London. On 20 April 1842 he became a student of Gray's Inn, and he was called to the bar on 23 April 1845. He became a bencher there in 1859, and treasurer in 1861.

Joining the Northern circuit, Manisty built a large practice, and was made Queen's Counsel on 7 July 1857; he appeared mainly in mercantile and circuit cases. In 1876, when Mr Justice Blackburn was made a law lord, Manisty was appointed to the High Court (Queen's Bench Division) at the unusually advanced age of 67, and was knighted. Among his decisions were judgments in Regina v. Bishop of Oxford (1879), Harwich Election Petition (1880), Belt v. Lawes (1881), Wennhak v Morgan (1888), Adams v. Coleridge (1891), and O'Brien v. Lord Salisbury (1889).

Manisty had a stroke in court on 24 January 1890, and died on 31 January at his home 24a Bryanston Square, London, He was buried on 5 February at Kensal Green cemetery.

Vanity Fair described him as ""a rather peevish, old-fashioned, careful Judge, who takes laborious notes of his cases; consequently he is slow; but he seldom speaks, and when he does so he generally speaks to the point."

== Family ==
In August 1831 Manisty married Constantia, fifth daughter of Patrick Dickson, solicitor of Berwick-on-Tweed; she died on 9 August 1836. In May 1838 he remarried Mary Ann, third daughter of Robert Stevenson, surgeon, of Berwick-on-Tweed, with whom he had four sons and three daughters. His fourth son, Herbert Francis Manisty, was Attorney-General of the County Palatine of Durham from 1915 to 1939.

== Notes ==
Attribution

This article incorporates text from a publication now in the public domain: Lee, Sidney, ed. (1893). "Manisty, Henry". Dictionary of National Biography. Vol. 36. London: Smith, Elder & Co.
