= Lampleigh v Brathwait =

Lampleigh v Brathwait [1615] EWHC KB J 17, (1615) Hobart 105, 80 ER 255 is a case on implied assumpsit and past consideration in English contract law.

== Facts ==
Brathwait killed a man called Patrick Mahume unlawfully. He asked Lampleigh to ride to the King and petition for a pardon. Lampleigh was successful and, delighted, Brathwait promised £100 to Lampleigh; but he never paid up and Lampleigh sued. Brathwait said that because the service had been performed in the past, there was no good consideration at the time for the promise, regardless of the fact that Lampleigh was successful in securing the pardon.

== Judgment ==
The Court of King's Bench held that there was an implied understanding (i.e. implied assumpsit, or "assumption" of obligation) that a fee would be paid. Where a past benefit was conferred at the beneficiary's request, and where a reward would reasonably be expected, the promisor would be bound by his promise.

== Significance ==
In later centuries, judges have pondered some unsettled issues arising from this case. What if the promised £100 was insufficient? What if nothing was promised; would quantum meruit be available?

== See also ==
- Restitution in English law
- Pao On v Lau Yiu Long
