= Gleaning Network =

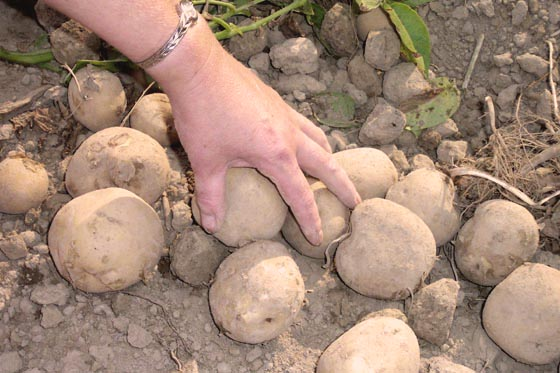

Gleaning Network is the most widespread and volunteer-oriented of the Society of St. Andrew's ministries.

== Background ==
Gleaning is the traditional Biblical practice of gathering crops that would otherwise be left in the fields to rot or be plowed under after harvest. Because the food is unmarketable, usually due to cosmetic reasons, some growers allow crews of gleaners to pick what is left after harvest to donate to those who are needy. It is also often more cost-effective for farmers to have their crops gleaned than to have paid pickers go back through the fields for the missed produce.

The Society of St. Andrew's Gleaning Network coordinates volunteers, growers, and distribution agencies to salvage food for the needy. Tens of thousands of volunteers from churches, synagogues, scout troops, senior citizen groups, and other organizations participate each year in Gleaning Network activities all across the country. Each year, tens of millions of pounds of produce are salvaged and given to the poor at no cost to them.

Gleaners are people of all ages and income levels who give their time and energy to this process. Within 48 hours of picking the produce, hungry Americans are usually eating the gleaned food. Each year, about 30,000 people join the Gleaning Network in salvaging over 15 million pounds of fresh, nutritious food for their hungry neighbors. The Society of St. Andrew has staff Gleaning Network coordinators in several states as well as volunteer coordinators nationwide. Volunteering can take place over a single morning or for many years of service, and is seen as a practical, humanitarian response to the problem of hunger.
