= List of judgments of the House of Lords delivered in 2009 =

This is list of cases heard before the Judicial Committee of the House of Lords in 2009.

From October 2009, the judicial functions of the House were taken over by the Supreme Court of the United Kingdom.

Title	Number	Date of Judgment
AS (Somalia) (FC) and another (Appellants) v Secretary of State for the Home Department (Respondent)	[2009] UKHL 32	17 June 2009
Attorney-General's Reference No. 3 of 1999: Application by the British Broadcasting corporation to set aside or vary a Reporting Restriction Order	[2009] UKHL 34	17 June 2009
Austin (FC) (Appellant) & another v Commissioner of Police of the Metropolis (Respondent)	[2009] UKHL 5	28 January 2009
Birmingham City Council (Appellants) v Ali (FC) and others (FC) (Respondents) Moran (FC) (Appellant) v Manchester City Council (Respondents)	[2009] UKHL 36	1 July 2009
Chartbrook Limited (Respondents) v Persimmon Homes Limited and others (Appellants) and another (Respondent)	[2009] UKHL 38	1 July 2009
Fisher (Original Respondent and Cross-appellant) v Brooker and others (Original Appellants and Cross-respondents)	[2009] UKHL 41	30 July 2009
Generics (UK) Limited and others (Appellants) v H Lundbeck A/S (Respondents)	[2009] UKHL 12	25 February 2009
Gomes (Appellant) v Government of Trinidad and Tobago (Respondents) & Goodyer (Appellant) v Government of Trinidad and Tobago (Respondents) (Conjoined Appeals)	[2009] UKHL 21	29 April 2009
Gray (Original Respondent and Cross appellants) v Thames Trains and others (Original Appellant and Cross respondents)	[2009] UKHL 33	17 June 2009
Hanoman (FC) (Respondent) v London Borough of Southwark (Appellants)	[2009] UKHL 29	10 June 2009
Her Majesty's Revenue and Customs (Respondents) v Stringer and others (Appellants)	[2009] UKHL 31	10 June 2009
Holmes-Moorhouse (FC) (Original Respondent and Cross-appellant) v London Borough of Richmond upon Thames (Original Appellants and Cross-respondents)	[2009] UKHL 7	4 February 2009
King (Respondent) v Director of the Serious Fraud Office (Appellant)	[2009] UKHL 17	18 March 2009
Lexington Insurance Company (Respondents) v AGF Insurance Limited (Appellants) and one other action & Lexington Insurance Company (Respondent) v Wasa International Insurance Company Limited (Appellants) and one other action	[2009] UKHL 40	30 July 2009
Marks and Spencer plc (Appellants) v Her Majesty's Commissioners of Customs and Excise (Respondents)	[2009] UKHL 8	4 February 2009
Masri (Respondent) v Consolidated Contractors International Company SAL and others and another (Appellant) and another	[2009] UKHL 43	30 July 2009
McConkey and another (Appellants) v The Simon Community (Respondents) (Northern Ireland)	[2009] UKHL 24	20 May 2009
In re McE (Appellant) (Northern Ireland) & In re M (Appellant) (Northern Ireland) & In re C (AP) and another (AP) (Appellants) (Northern Ireland)	[2009] UKHL 15	11 March 2009
Mitchell (AP) and another (Original Respondents and Cross-appellants) v Glasgow City Council (Original Appellant and Cross-respondents) (Scotland)	[2009] UKHL 11	18 February 2009
Moore Stephens (a firm) (Respondents) v Stone Rolls Limited (in liquidation) (Appellants)	[2009] UKHL 39	30 July 2009
Mucelli (Appellant) v Government of Albania (Respondents) & Moulai (Respondent) v Deputy Public Prosecutor in Creteil, France (Appellant)	[2009] UKHL 2	21 January 2009
Odelola (FC) (Appellant) v Secretary of State for the Home Department (Respondent)	[2009] UKHL 25	20 May 2009
Ofulue and another (FC) (Appellant) v Bossert (FC) (Respondent)	[2009] UKHL 16	11 March 2009
RB (Algeria) (FC) and another (Appellants) v Secretary of State for the Home Department & OO (Jordan) (Original Respondent and Cross-appellant) v Secretary of State for the Home Department (Original Appellant and Cross-respondent)	[2009] UKHL 10	18 February 2009
R (on the application of Ahmad) (Respondent) v Mayor and Burgesses of London Borough of Newham (Appellants)	[2009] UKHL 14	4 March 2009
R (On The Application of Black) (Respondent) v Secretary of State for Justice (Appellant)	[2009] UKHL 1	21 January 2009
R (on the application of G) (FC) (Appellant) v London Borough of Southwark (Respondents)	[2009] UKHL 26	20 May 2009
R (on the application of Purdy) (Appellant) v Director of Public Prosecutions (Respondent)	[2009] UKHL 45	30 July 2009
R v Briggs-Price (Appellant)	[2009] UKHL 19	29 April 2009
R v C (Respondent)	[2009] UKHL 42	30 July 2009
R v G (Respondent) & R v J (Respondent)	[2009] UKHL 13	4 March 2009
R v Islam (Respondent)	[2009] UKHL 30	10 June 2009
R v JTB (Appellant)	[2009] UKHL 20	29 April 2009
R (On the application of Wright and others) (Appellants) v Secretary of State for Health and another (Respondents)	[2009] UKHL 3	21 January 2009
SCA Packaging Limited (Appellants) v Boyle (Respondent) (Northern Ireland)	[2009] UKHL 37	1 July 2009
Secretary of State for the Home Department (Respondent) v AF (Appellant) (FC) and another (Appellant) and one other action	[2009] UKHL 28	10 June 2009
Secretary of State for the Home Department (Respondent) v Nasseri (FC)(Appellant)	[2009] UKHL 23	6 May 2009
Secretary of State for Justice (Respondent) v James (FC) (Appellant) (formerly Walker and another) & R (on the application of Lee) (FC) (Appellant) v Secretary of State for Justice (Respondent) and one other action	[2009] UKHL 22	6 May 2009
Smith (Appellant) v Northamptonshire County Council (Respondents)	[2009] UKHL 27	20 May 2009
Sugar (Appellant) v British Broadcasting Corporation and another (Respondents)	[2009] UKHL 9	11 February 2009
Thorner (Appellant) v Majors and others (Respondents)	[2009] UKHL 18	25 March 2009
Transport for London (London Underground Limited) (Appellants) v Spirerose Limited (in administration) (Respondents)	[2009] UKHL 44	30 July 2009
Trent Strategic Health Authority (Respondents) v Jain and another (Appellants)	[2009] UKHL 4	21 January 2009
TRM Copy Centres (UK) Limited and others (Respondents) v Lanwall Services Limited (Appellants)	[2009] UKHL 35	17 June 2009
Z T (Kosovo) (Respondent) v Secretary of State for the Home Department (Appellant)	[2009] UKHL 6	4 February 2009

== See also ==
- List of judgments of the Supreme Court of the United Kingdom delivered in 2009
- List of judgments of the House of Lords
- List of landmark judgments of the House of Lords
- List of judgments of the House of Lords delivered in 2008
