= Landmark Cases in Family Law =

2011 legal book

- Publisher: Bloomsbury Publishing
- Publication date: 2011
- ISBN: 978-1-5099-0505-8

Landmark Cases in Family Law (2011) is a book of chapters contributed by various authors, which outlines the key cases in English family law.

== Content ==
The cases discussed are,

- The Roos case (1670): Rebecca Probert, Associate Professor, University of Warwick.
- J v C and Another [1970] AC 668L: Nigel Lowe, Professor of Law, Cardiff University.
- Corbett v Corbett (Orse. Ashley)[1971] P 83: Stephen Gilmore, Senior Lecturer in Law, King's College London.
- Burns v Burns [1984] Ch 317.: John Mee, University College Cork.
- Szechter (Orse. Karsov) v Szechter [1971] P 286: Mary Hayes, Emeritus Professor, University of Sheffield.
- S v S; W v Official Solicitor [1972] AC 24: Andrew Bainham, Fellow of Christ's College, University of Cambridge.
- Poel v Poel [1970] 1 WLR 1469: Rachel Taylor, University of Oxford.
- Wachtel v Wachtel [1973] Fam 72: Gillian Douglas, Professor of Law, Cardiff University.
- Gillick v West Norfolk and Wisbech AHA [1986] AC 112: Jane Fortin, Professor of Law, University of Sussex.
- R v R [1992] 1 AC 599: Jonathan Herring, Fellow of Exeter College, University of Oxford.
- X (Minors) v Bedfordshire County Council etc [1995] 2 AC 633: Judith Masson, Professor of Socio-legal Studies, University of Bristol.
- White v White [2000] 1 AC 596: Elizabeth Cooke, Law Commissioner for England and Wales and Professor of Law, University of Reading.
- Fitzpatrick v Sterling Housing Association [2001] 1 AC 27: Lisa Glennon, Lecturer, Queen's University, Belfast.

== Reception ==
Nottingham Trent University sociologist professor Robert Dingwall wrote, "The book is beautifully written, nicely produced and just full of intrinsically fascinating material." In a positive review in Child and Family Law Quarterly, Simon Edward Rowbotham stated, "Landmark Cases is not overly legalistic, its appeal transcending the world of lawyers, academics and students. The re-telling of the cases includes some enjoyable prose, often peppered with colourful anecdotes that indulge the voyeuristic side of reading cases: the desire to follow the characters bevond the court room."

== See also ==
- Landmark case
- Restitution in English law
- Landmark Cases in the Law of Restitution (2006) by Charles Mitchell and Paul Mitchell
- Landmark Cases in the Law of Tort (2010) by Charles Mitchell and Paul Mitchell
- Landmark Cases in Contract (2008) by Charles Mitchell and Paul Mitchell
- Landmark Cases in Equity (2012) by Charles Mitchell and Paul Mitchell
- Landmark Cases in Land Law (2013) by Nigel Gravells
