= Wright v Tatham =

Wright V. Doe d. Tatham
- Court: Exchequer Court
- Decided: 1838

Case history
- Related action: hearsay

Keywords
- Case law

Wright v Doe d. Tatham (1838) is a famous Exchequer Court decision on the use of hearsay within a trial. The case was further one of the main inspirations for Dickens' Bleak House. The decision was later upheld by the House of Lords in R v Kearly (1992).

== Facts ==
Tatham was the claimant and heir to the fortune of the deceased. The will, however, had devised a portion of the property to Wright, a former servant. The main issue was whether the deceased had the required testamentary capacity when he wrote his will. Three letters written to the testator were submitted as circumstantial evidence that the author believed the testator was of sound mind and the issue was whether these letters could be admitted as evidence to prove competence or whether they constituted hearsay. Wright had argued that the letters were admissible because they showed that the testator was seen and treated as a competent in the eyes of those who knew him. Tatham argued that they were inadmissible and so would have to sworn under oath before they could be admissible.

== Judgment of the Court ==
The House of Lords held that the letters were inadmissible as hearsay because the letters implied the statement "Marsden was of sound mind."

== Subsequent use ==
The case appears in numerous treatises and evidence text books because of the difficult hearsay issue it raised. Baron Parke held that conduct consistent with a belief in a fact is hearsay when offered to prove the existence of that fact. The approach taken by Federal Rules of Evidence 801(a) does not yield the same result, as it requires that there be an intention to assert, which was absent from the "statement" in Wright v. Doe d. Tatham.
