= Steel v Houghton =

1788 English legal decision supporting property rights

Steel v Houghton (1788)
- Court: House of Lords
- Decided: 1788
- Citation: (1788) 1 H Bl 51; 126 ER 32.

Court membership
- Judge sitting: Lord Loughborough

Keywords
- gleaning property law

Steel v Houghton (1788) 1 H Bl 51; 126 ER 32, also known as the Great Gleaning Case, is a landmark judgment in English law by the House of Lords that is considered to mark the modern legal understanding of private property rights. Ostensibly the matter found that no person has a right at common law to glean the harvest of a private field, but the judgment has been taken to be a more general precedent for private land matters.

== Background ==
In early modern England gleaning was an important source of income for labouring families, at a time when many parishes were affected by enclosure and the wholesale transformation of property rights.

Over the harvests of 1785-1787, conflict had been escalating between land owners and gleaners in the village of Timworth, Suffolk. In 1787, Mary Houghton gleaned on the farm of a wealthy land owner, James Steel, who sued for trespass.

== Verdict ==
The court sided with landlords and found against the gleaners' claims, rejecting arguments from Mosaic Law (A precedent for gleaning is to be found in the Bible at Leviticus 19:9-10) and from the traditional Anglo-Saxon constitution as a basis for the common law. Although precedent was raised by the gleaners that appeared to support gleaning, the court held that this was only to be viewed in the narrowest of terms with conditions, as was legislation which had provision for gleaning (the sections that were discussed dealt only with penalties). The Court held gleaning to be only a "privilege" and not a right; the poor of a parish had no legal right to glean, hence gleaning was trespass.

Lord Loughborough gave the leading judgment of the majority and argued that:

- gleaning was not a universal common law right, as it was unknown in some places
- it was uncertain who could claim such a right
- the law should not turn acts of charity into legal obligations
- Mosaic Law and pronouncements of Hale, Blackstone, Lord Justice Gilbert, and others were either irrelevant to common law precedent or at best merely dicta
- granting a right to glean would "raise the insolence of the poor"
- as well as being against the interests of the poor since, by reducing the farmers' profits, it would reduce the rate payers’ capacity to contribute to the poor rates;

Loughborough's conclusion was that the gleaners' defence was "inconsistent with the nature of property which imports absolute enjoyment"

Peter King sums up the case and its context in Timworth in his 2006 book Crime and Law in England, 1750–1840: Remaking Justice from the Margins:

Steel v. Houghton et Uxor resulted from a conjunction of specific conflicts of interest. A small group of rich tenant farmers were probably the prime movers, but it would be unwise to assume that their desire to control the gleaners’ access to their holdings was necessarily the only or even the main reason why the case was fought. In 1788, the Houghtons’ smallholding was one of the few remaining parts of the Culford estate parishes not yet under Cornwallis' control. Its purchase almost certainly enabled him to complete the enclosure process and to bring to fruition his family’s long-term plans to make this a closed parish—a classic estate village.

The Houghtons and the Mannings found themselves under intense pressure from two major, if not always unified, forces in eighteenth-century rural society—the united power of a small group of increasingly wealthy, profit-oriented farmers on the one hand, and the immense wealth and prestige of the traditional landed aristocracy on the other.

== Criticism ==
The decision has been criticized on legal grounds for ignoring statute and precedents for an outcome that denied natural justice and has been criticized by Marxist scholars as a decision that was thinly veiled class oppression, particularly citing Loughborough's choice of words.

== See also ==
- Worlledge v Manning (1786)
