= Cavanagh v Ulster Weaving Co Ltd =

Cavanaugh v. Ulster Weaving Ltd

Court membership
- Judges sitting: Viscount Simonds, Lord Tucker, Lord Keith of Avonholm, Lord Somervell of Harrow and Lord Jenkins

Cavanaugh v. Ulster Weaving Ltd., (1960) A.C. 145 and A.C. (1959) 2 All E.R. (H.L.) is a legal judgment in a tort case decided by the Judicial Committee of the House of Lords, clarifying the test for negligence by finding that evidence of trade practices is insufficient to prove absence of negligence of employer's duties on the facts.

An employer's duty towards its employees was expressed by Lord Somervell of Harrow as follows: "put in its simplest terms the general scope of the duty of an employer is a duty to take reasonable care in all circumstances."
