= Pinchon's case =

Pinchon's case was an early court case and precedent in assumpsit.

Pinchons case established that contractual liability was transmittable to an estate if the debtor had died. However, the court also held that collateral promises did die with the debtor. This decision was over turned in Sanders v Easterby. when the court held that executors could be held liable for debts.

== See also ==
- Actio personalis moritur cum persona
