= Wakelin v London & South Western Railway Co =

- Decided: 1886

Court membership
- Judges sitting: Lord Watson, Lord Halsbury

Wakelin v London and South Western Railway Co. (1886) was a case heard by the House of Lords regarding Personal Injury and Negligence. The case was between Wakelin and the London and South Western Railway Co. Lord Watson concluded that a defendant's liability must be in the first place where "some negligent act or omission on the part of the company or their servants which materially contributed to the injury or death complained of. Mere allegation or proof that the company were guilty of negligence is altogether irrelevant; they might be guilty of many negligent acts or omissions, which might possibly have occasioned injury to somebody, but had no connection whatever with the injury for which redress is sought, and therefore the plaintiff must allege and prove, not merely that they were negligent, but that their negligence caused or materially contributed to the injury."

Which simply put is to say that it must be proven that the defendant's negligence directly caused said injury and not that the negligence was simply related to said injury.

== Later uses of the ruling ==
The ruling was used in Canadian Coloured Cotton Mills Co. v Kervin, 29 S.C.R. 478, a case heard by the Supreme Court of Canada in 1886. Which ruled that "The plaintiffs are not entitled to a verdict at common law as the case cannot be distinguished from Wakelin v London & South Western Railway Co".
