= Wennhak v Morgan =

- Decided: 1888
- Citation: [1888] 20 QBD 635

Wennhak v Morgan is a leading case in English defamation law, that held that communication with one's own spouse will not be considered to be 'published' for the purposes of defamation cases.

In Wennhak, Huddleston B thought (with Manisty J. agreeing) that the question could be decided “on the common law principle that husband and wife are one”, and that accordingly there had been no publication.

“[T]he maxim and principle acted on for centuries is still in existence, viz, that as regards this case, husband and wife are in point of law one person.”
