= Herd v Weardale Steel Coal & Coke Ltd =

- Transcript: judgment

Herd v Weardale Steel Coal & Coke Ltd was a case heard by the House of Lords in 1915. The case involved a miner who demanded to be returned to the surface before the end of his shift. The case regards false imprisonment. The miner claimed for damages, however the claim was denied on the grounds that he had willingly entered the pit and that his employers were only obliged to take him to the surface at the end of his shift.
