= Browne v Dunn =

1893 UK legal case on cross examination

- Court: House of Lords
- Full case name: Browne v Dunn
- Decided: 28 November 1893
- Citation: (1893) 6 R. 67 (H.L.) https://www.brownevdunn.com

Browne v. Dunn (1893) 6 R. 67, H.L. is a famous British House of Lords decision on the rules of cross examination. From this case came the common law rule known as the "Browne v Dunn rule" or "The rule in Browne v Dunn". The rule in Browne v Dunn essentially entails that a cross examiner cannot rely on evidence that is contradictory to the testimony of the witness without putting the evidence to the witness in order to allow them to attempt to justify the contradiction.

Therefore, under this rule if a witness gives testimony that is inconsistent with what the opposing party wants to lead as evidence, the opposing party must raise the contention with that witness during cross-examination. This rule can be seen as an anti-ambush rule because it prevents a party from putting forward a case without first affording opposing witnesses the opportunity of responding to it. This not having been done, that party cannot later bring evidence to contradict the testimony of the witness.

The decision arose out of a civil case involving the parties James Loxham Browne and Cecil W. Dunn (solicitor). The case stemmed from a document issued by Dunn on behalf of others addressed to Browne. The document indicated that the signatories, all residents of The Vale, Hampstead, requested Dunn apply for an order against Browne to keep the peace.

At a subsequent Breach of the Peace hearing, Browne became aware of the document and commenced libel proceedings against all parties. During that hearing the document was never shown to any of the signatories by Browne during his cross examination. During the hearing Browne produced the document citing it "a sham". The jury eventually found in favour of Browne and ordered damages of 20 shillings. Dunn appealed to the Court of Criminal Appeal and the verdict was set aside. Browne then appealed to the House of Lords. During that appeal it was discovered that a number of the signatories were present at the original trial and none of them was asked if the document was genuine.

The rule is best described in the judgment of Hunt J in Allied Pastoral Holdings Pty Ltd v Commissioner of Taxation, who observed:

"It has in my experience always been a rule of professional practice that, unless notice has already clearly been given of the cross-examiner's intention to rely upon such matter, it is necessary to put to an opponent's witness in cross-examination the nature of the case upon which it is proposed to rely in contradiction of his evidence, particularly where that case relies upon inferences to be drawn from other evidence in the proceedings. Such a rule of practice is necessary both to give the witness the opportunity to deal with that other evidence, or the inferences to be drawn from it, and to allow the other party the inference sought to be drawn."

Lord Herschell originally explained it as:

"... I cannot help saying that it seems to me to be absolutely essential to the proper conduct of a cause, where it is intended to suggest that a witness is not speaking the truth on a particular point, to direct his attention to the fact by some questions put in cross-examination showing that that imputation is intended to be made, and not to take his evidence and pass it by as a matter altogether unchallenged, and then, when it is impossible for him to explain, as perhaps he might have been able to do if such questions had been put to him, the circumstances which it is suggested indicate that the story he tells ought not to be believed, to argue that he is a witness unworthy of credit. My Lords, I have always understood that if you intend to impeach a witness you are bound, whilst he is in the box, to give him an opportunity of making any explanation which is open to him; and, as it seems to me, that is not only a rule of professional practice in the conduct of a case, but is essential to fair play and fair dealing with witnesses."

The practical necessity is obvious, as Wells J noted in Reid v Kerr:

"... a judge (or a jury) is entitled to have presented to him (or them) issues of facts that are well and truly joined on the evidence; there is nothing more frustrating to a tribunal of fact than to be presented with two important bodies of evidence which are inherently opposed in substance but which, because Browne v Dunn has not been observed, have not been brought into direct opposition, and serenely pass one another like two trains in the night."

The rule has been adopted in most common law countries, including South Africa, Australia and Fiji, and it remains one of the primary rules of consideration during cross-examination.

In Australia the rule in Browne v Dunn overlaps with section 46 of the Evidence Act 1995 (NSW) and Evidence Act 1995 (Cth). In New Zealand it has been codified as section 92 of the Evidence Act 2006.
