= Hambly v Trott =

Hambly v Trott is a landmark Court case in conversion and trover.

The defendant had appropriated some sheep, goats, pigs and cider from the plaintiff and then died. The plaintiff sought return of these items from the deceased estate. The plaintiff was ultimately unsuccessful but Lord Mansfield and Justices Acton and Ashurst set out the rules by which a claim against an estate may be successful. Mansfield explained that while an action for trespass would fail as it was against the person not the property, an action for contract or for trover would succeed.

The case was one of the founding cases for the maxim Actio personalis moritur cum persona.
