= A v Hoare =

A v Hoare, [2008] UKHL 6, is a leading tort case in British law, decided by the House of Lords in 2008.

The Lords held that the limitation period for actions founded on torts of negligence may be disapplied where it is inequitable to enforce it. This case centred on the wording of the Limitation Act 1980, which created an exception to the three year limitation period for "any action for damages for negligence, nuisance or breach of duty."

In the earlier case, Stubbings v Webb [1993] AC 498, S v W [1995] FLR 862, the words "negligence, nuisance or breach of duty" were construed in such a way as to exclude sexual assault. Stubbings v Webb was criticised as being unfair to claimants, notably by the Law Commission. A v Hoare overruled the judgment of the House of Lords in Stubbings v Webb in favour of what the judges considered to be a fairer approach.

== Background ==
The judgment summarized the facts as follows:

"In A v Hoare the defendant was convicted in 1989 of an attempted rape of the claimant, involving a serious and traumatic sexual assault; he was sentenced to life imprisonment. In 2004, while still serving his sentence, he won £7m on the national lottery. The claimant started proceedings for damages on 22 December 2004 but Master Eyre, applying Stubbings, struck out the action as barred under section 2 of the 1980 Act. This decision was affirmed by the judge and the Court of Appeal [2006] 1 WLR 2320."

The perpetrator, Iorworth Hoare, a British national from Leeds, had previously been convicted of a series of sex attacks between 1973 and 1987, for which he had received prison sentences totalling 18 years. As he was penniless as of his final conviction in 1989, the victim did not pursue a civil action for damages against him but claimed compensation of £5,000 from the government by way of the Criminal Injuries Compensation Board.

In December 2004, within a few months of Hoare's lottery win becoming public, 16 years after the crime, and well outside the six-year time limit for tort set by the Limitation Act 1980, the victim pursued a civil action for damages against Hoare personally. This claim was struck out for being out of time by the High Court, in 2005, and by the Court of Appeal in 2006, following the case of Stubbings v Webb. The House of Lords overturned this decision in A v Hoare. The victim was awarded £50,000 in compensation, and Hoare was required to pay costs for both sides of around £800,000. Hoare challenged the ruling in the European Court of Human Rights, but was unsuccessful.

Hoare was released in 2005. He received death threats as a result of his notoriety; in 2006, a man was jailed indefinitely for threatening to kill Hoare. Hoare's victim, Shirley Woodman, waived her right to anonymity in 2012, when she received an MBE for her actions.

== Decision ==
The House of Lords held that the words "negligence, nuisance or breach of duty" could be construed to include sexual assault and thus bring them within the s33 discretion to disapply the limitation period for claims. Lord Hoffmann reasoned that s33 had caused victims of intentional torts 'the need to frame a claim in one or other of these ways when the real cause of complaint was sexual abuse for which the employer was vicariously liable was causing "arid and highly wasteful litigation turning on a distinction of no apparent principle or other merit".' The case was remitted to the High Court for the judge to reconsider in the light the House of Lords speeches.

This decision was followed in Field v British Coal Corp, [2008] EWCA Civ 912 by the Court of Appeal of England and Wales.
