= Wrotham Park Estate Co Ltd v Parkside Homes Ltd =

English contract law case on remedies

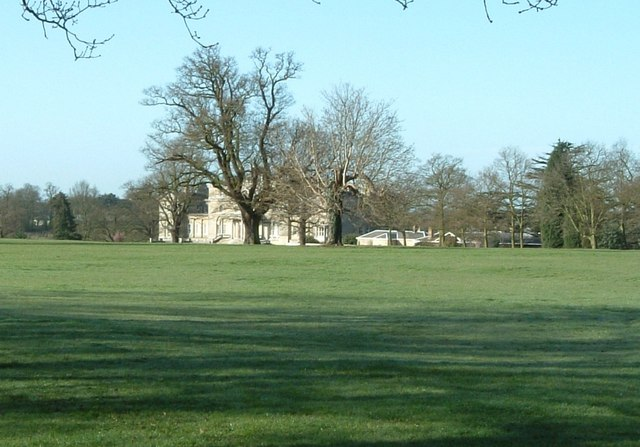
- Court: High Court of Justice, Chancery Division
- Decided: 19 October 1973
- Citation: [1974] 1 WLR 798

Court membership
- Judge sitting: Brightman J

Keywords
- Restitutionary damages

Wrotham Park Estate Co Ltd v Parkside Homes Ltd [1974] 1 WLR 798 (/ˈruːtəm/) is an English land law and English contract law case, concerning the measure and availability of damages for breach of negative covenant in circumstances where the court has confirmed that a covenant is legally enforceable and refused, as unconscionable, to issue an order for specific performance or an injunction.

Such a remedy, which had precedent before the judgment, has since become generally known as Wrotham Park damages, which are awarded (in lieu of specific performance or an injunction) under the jurisdiction created (powers vested in the court) by s. 2 of the Chancery Amendment Act 1858 (also known as Lord Cairns' Act). Such damages centre on the hypothetical negotiated value for a release of the covenant, and so in turn may look to a share of the profits from the business venture enabled by the breach; the court decided 5% of profits should be made payable.

== Facts ==
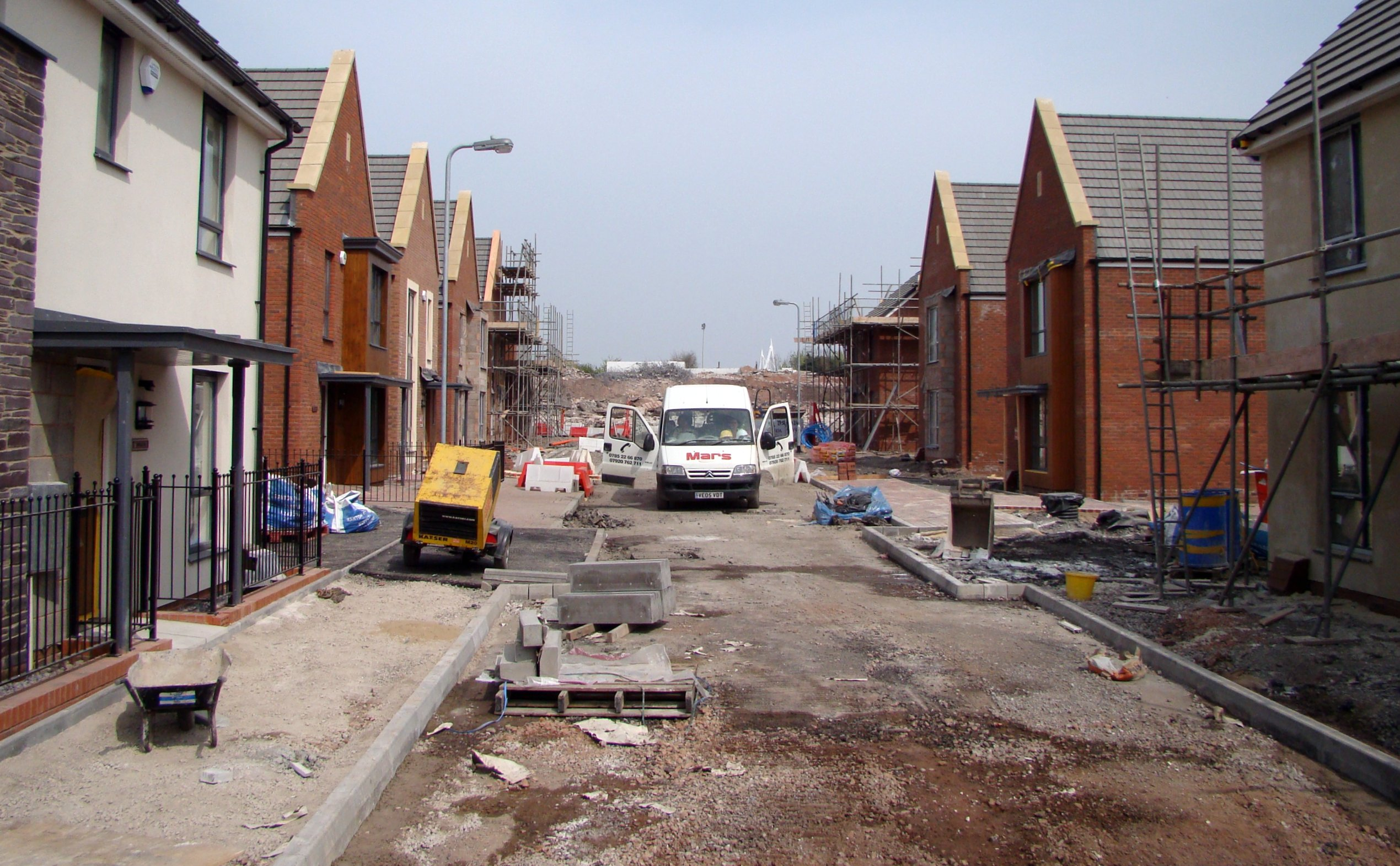
A relatively small housing estate during construction

Wrotham Park (pronounced /ˈruːtəm/) is an estate owned and lived in for generations by gentry and then nobility including the Earl of Strafford. Outlying portions have been sold off for development, subject to some lay-out restrictions. Potters Bar Urban District Council came to own one desolate triangle of land. They offered it for sale by public auction as freehold building land for 14 houses. Parkside bought the land and built the houses, despite warnings from Wrotham Park Estate's owners that Parkside were violating the lay-out restrictions. When the houses were built, the owners of the Estate brought a claim against Parkside for breach of the restrictive covenant.

== Judgment ==
Brightman J (as he then was) awarded damages of £2,500 as a substitute for an injunction. The damages were measured as the amount that might reasonably have been demanded by the plaintiff as payment for relaxing the covenant, being 5% of the developer's anticipated profit. He refused to make an order to demolish the houses built, preferring to award damages under Lord Cairns' Act, saying:

... the defendants argue that the damages are nil or purely nominal, because the value of the Wrotham Park Estate as the plaintiffs concede is not diminished by one farthing in consequence of the construction of a road and the erection of 14 houses on the allotment site. If, therefore, the defendants submit, I refuse an injunction I ought to award no damages in lieu. That would seem, on the face of it, a result of questionable fairness on the facts of this case....

If, for social and economic reasons, the court does not see fit in the exercise of its discretion, to order demolition of the 14 houses, is it just that the plaintiffs should receive no compensation and that the defendants should be left in undisturbed possession of the fruits of their wrongdoing? Common sense would seem to demand a negative answer to this question....

In the present case I am faced with the problem what damages ought to be awarded to the plaintiffs in the place of mandatory injunctions which would have restored the plaintiffs’ rights. If the plaintiffs are merely given a nominal sum, or no sum, in substitution for injunctions, it seems to me that justice will manifestly not have been done.

== Impact ==
The jurisdiction for Wrotham Park damages has been expanded and clarified in subsequent cases, and was summarised by the Judicial Committee of the Privy Council in 2009:

1. Damages awarded are intended to compensate the claimant for the court's decision not to grant relief in the form of an order for specific performance or an injunction.
2. The court will award an amount of damages which represents the sum that the claimant might reasonably have demanded from the defendant as compensation for allowing it to breach the relevant contractual provision. The court assesses this by reference to a "hypothetical negotiation" carried out between the parties at the date of breach.
3. At the "hypothetical negotiation" both parties are assumed to act reasonably and the fact that the parties would never have reached a deal in reality is irrelevant.
4. Although these damages are awarded in place of relief e.g. an injunction, it is not a prerequisite to their being awarded that either (i) the claimant applied for the injunction in the case or (ii) there was any prospect of such application succeeding.

While founded in land law, Wrotham Park damages have been found to be available in other contexts, such as employment law in relation to restrictive covenants.

Limitations on applicability exist. Wrotham Park damages will not be available where a plaintiff has originally sought damages for consequential economic damage, which are commonly sought in the law of nuisance for example.

=== Commonwealth jurisdictions ===
In Singapore, the leading case on Wrotham Park damages is the case of Turf Club Auto Emporium Pte Ltd v Yeo Boong Hua.

== Cases cited ==
=== Applied ===
- Marten v Flight Refuelling Ltd [1962] Ch 115; [1961] 2 WLR 1018; [1961] 2 All ER 696, Ch D [1962] Ch 115, 136
- Northbourne (Lord) v Johnston & Son [1922] 2 Ch 309, ChD
- In Force India Formula One Team Ltd v 1 Malaysia F1 Team SDN BHD and others [2012], Mr Justice Arnold (now Lord Justice Arnold) noted that Wrotham Park damages were "also known as 'gain-based damages' and 'negotiating damages'", the last of these being his preferred terminology. Arnold J ruled in this case, after an extensive review of earlier case law, that "negotiating damages" were available for breaches of contractual duties and also equitable obligations of confidence.

=== Distinguished ===
- Powell v Hemsley [1909] 2 Ch 252, CA

=== Considered ===
- Kilbey v Haviland (1871) 24 LT 353
- Isenberg v East India House Estate Co Ltd (1863) 3 De GJ & Sm 263
- Durell v Pritchard (1865) LR 1 Ch App 244

== See also ==
- English land law
- English contract law
