= Johnson v Agnew =

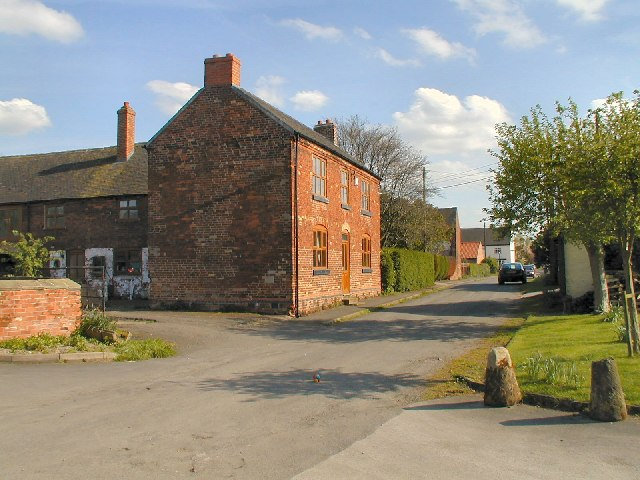
- Court: House of Lords
- Citation: [1980] AC 367, [1979] 1 All ER 883

Case history
- Prior action: [1978] Ch 176

Case opinions
- Lord Wilberforce

Johnson v Agnew [1980] AC 367 is a landmark English contract law case on the date for assessing damages. Lord Wilberforce decided that the date appropriate is the date of breach, or when a contracting party could reasonably be aware of a breach.

Five major principles it laid down were,

1. termination for breach of contract is "prospective", not "retrospective"; i.e. repudiatory breach of contract discharges both parties from future performance of their contractual obligations, but leaves their accrued rights intact (and themselves open to damages)
2. a claimant for specific performance does not forfeit his right to terminate the contract by accepting a defendant's repudiatory breach
3. when a specific performance decree is made, a court oversees performance, and it has the sole jurisdiction to determine whether that obligation can be discharged
4. common law damages are assessed at the date of the breach of the contract, though the court may fix another date if justice requires
5. the same principles for awarding common law damages apply to awarding equitable damages under s 50 Supreme Court Act 1981

== Facts ==
The 'commonplace, indeed routine' facts were that Mrs Adeline Agnew twice failed to complete purchase of Michael and Renee Johnson's farm, Scheepcote Grange, Woodburn Common, Buckinghamshire. She had contracted to buy the farm on 1 November 1973 for £117,000. When everything was ready in December and January 1974, she did nothing. Meanwhile, the Johnsons were in financial trouble. They were in arrears on mortgage repayments. In March 1974 they claimed specific performance of the contract, and won summary judgment in June, but the order was not drawn up until November, and so the Johnsons left it, because in the meantime, the mortgagees had won orders for possession and sale of the property. The Johnsons' lawyer advised there was no point enforcing against Agnew. The mortgagees only realised £48,000, not even enough to discharge the Johnsons' mortgage debts. The Johnsons' creditors filed them into bankruptcy. This was adjourned, and the Johnsons' brought a claim against Agnew seeking the purchase price (less deposit and the £48,000 realised on sale by the mortgagees), and a declaration that the contract was repudiated and to keep the deposit price.

== Judgment ==
Lord Wilberforce said,

The general principle for the assessment of damages is compensatory, ie that the innocent party is to be place, so far as money can do so, in the same position as if the contract had been performed. Where the contract is one of sale, this principle normally leads to assessment of damages as at the date of the breach, a principle recognised and embodied in s 51 of the Sale of Goods Act 1893. But this is not an absolute rule; if to follow it would give rise to injustice, the court has power to fix such other date as may be appropriate in the circumstances. In cases where a breach of a contract for sale has occurred, and the innocent party reasonably continues to try to have the contract completed, it would to me appear more logical and just rather than tie him to the date of the original breach, to assess damages as at the date when (otherwise than by his default) the contract is lost. Support for this approach is to be found in the cases.

On the prospective nature of a repudiatory breach, he said this.

It is important to dissipate a fertile source of confusion and to make clear that although the vendor is sometimes referred to [where accepting a repudiatory breach] as "rescinding" the contract, this so-called "rescission" is quite different from rescission Ab initio, such as may arise, for example, in cases of mistake, fraud or lack of consent. In those cases, the contract is treated in law as never having come into existence... In the case of an accepted repudiatory breach, the contract has come into existence but has been put and end to or discharged. Whatever contrary indications may be disinterred from old authorities, it is now quite clear, under the general law of contract, that acceptance of a repudiatory beach does not bring about "rescission ab initio".

== See also ==
- Breach of contract
- Hillel v Christoforides (1991) 63 P&CR 301 (ChD)
- Jaggard v Sawyer [1994] EWCA Civ 1
- Hurst v Bryk [2000] UKHL 19, [2002] 1 AC 185
- Capital and Suburban Properties Ltd v Swycher [1976] 1 Ch 319
