= Gleaning =

Form of food recovery

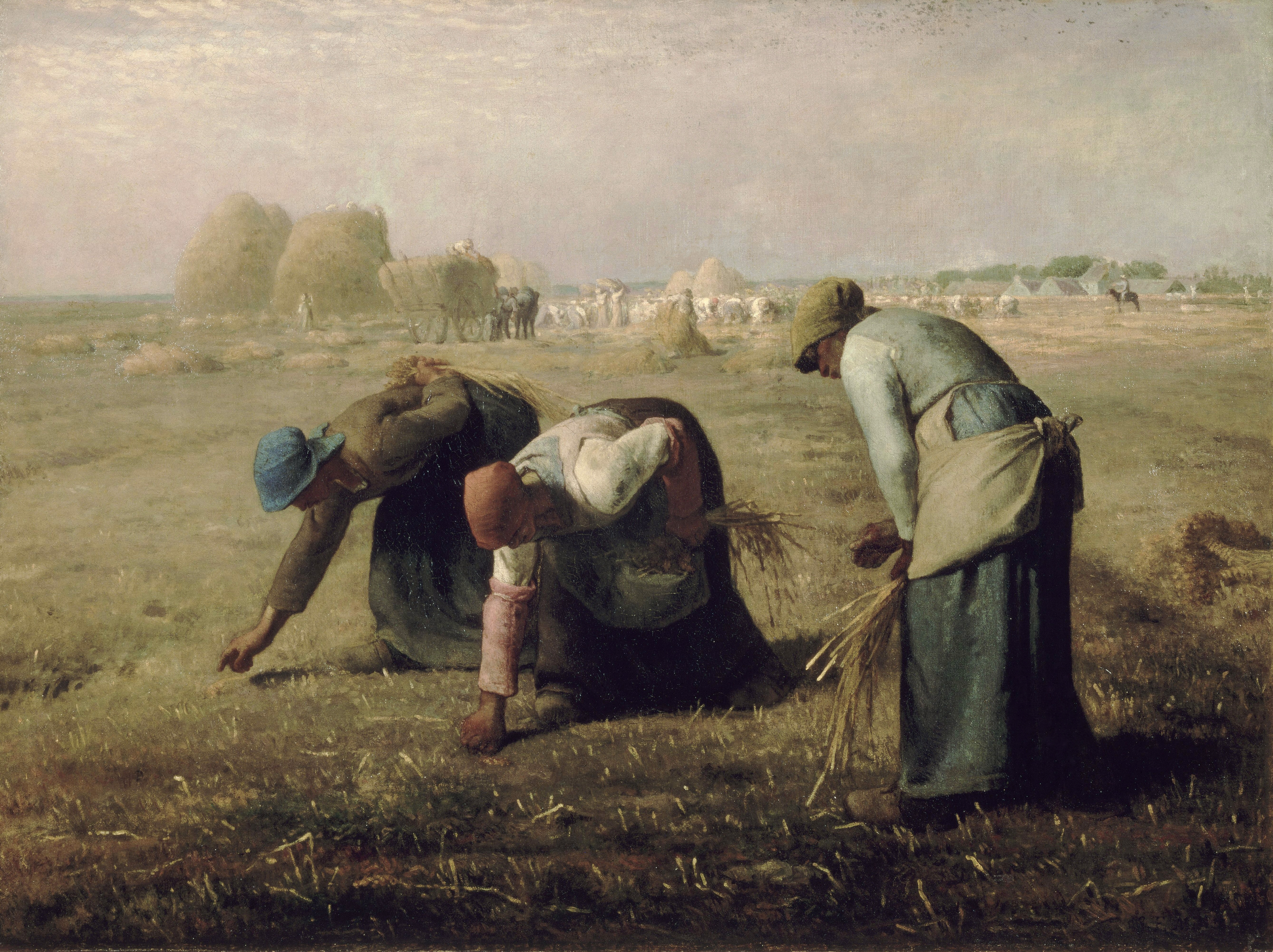
The Gleaners by Jean-François Millet, 1857

Gleaning is the act of collecting leftover crops in the field after harvest. During harvest, there is food that is left or missed often because it does not meet store standards for uniformity. Sometimes, fields are left because they were not economically profitable to harvest.

In modern times, gleaning is used to provide fresh foods to those in need. "Dumpster diving", when done for food or culinary ingredients, is seen as a similar form of food recovery. There are multiple organizations that support gleaning, including the Gleaning Network in the UK, and the National Gleaning Project in the United States. Both organizations have worked on national networks to connect modern gleaning and food recovery organizations.

== History ==
The term glean was first used in English in the 14th Century, and meant both "to gather grain or other produce left by reapers" and "to gather information or material bit by bit". It has roots in Middle English (glenen), Anglo-French (glener), and Late Latin (glen(n)ō (“make a collection). Gleaning is referred to throughout history, including biblical references in the books of Leviticus and Deuteronomy. Gleaning has long been a part of agricultural calendar and process, and was practiced widely by the rural poor during the 16th and 17th Centuries. Additionally, as much as one-eighth of labour-based households' annual earnings came from gleaning in the 18th and 19th Centuries. Technology of the mid-19th Century would heavily reduce gleaning globally.

=== In the Bible ===
According to the books of Deuteronomy and Leviticus, farmers should leave the edges of their fields unharvested (pe'ah), should not pick up that which was dropped (gleanings), and should not harvest any overlooked produce that had been forgotten when they harvested the majority of a field. On one of the two occasions that this is stated in Leviticus, it adds that in vineyards, some grapes should be left ungathered, a statement also found in Deuteronomy.

These verses additionally command that olive trees should not be beaten on multiple occasions, and whatever remains from the first set of beatings should be left. According to Leviticus, these things should be left for the poor and for strangers, and Deuteronomy commands that it should be left for widows, strangers, and paternal orphans. The Book of Ruth tells of gleaning by the widow Ruth to provide for herself and her mother-in-law, Naomi, who was also a widow.

=== Rabbinical view ===
In classical rabbinic literature, it was argued that the biblical regulations concerning left-overs only applied to grain fields, orchards, and vineyards. The farmer was not permitted to benefit from the gleanings, and was not permitted to discriminate among the poor, nor try to frighten them away with dogs or lions; the farmer was not even allowed to help one of the poor to gather the left-overs. However, it was also argued that the law was only applicable in Canaan, although many classical rabbinic writers, who were based in Babylon, applied the laws there too; it was also seen as only applying to Jewish paupers, but poor gentiles were allowed to benefit for the sake of civil peace.

=== Historic European practice ===
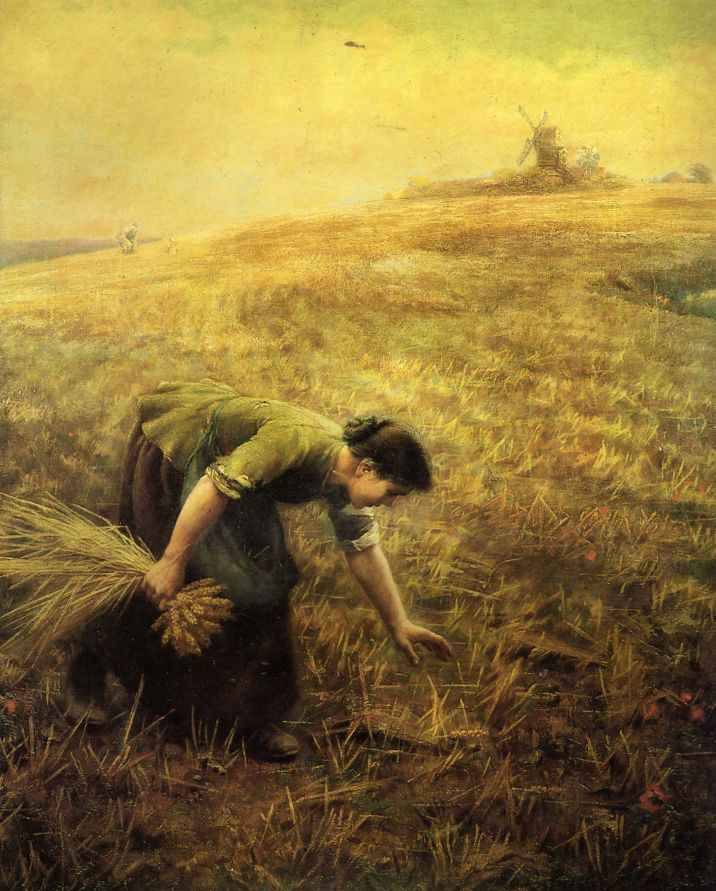
Gleaning by Arthur Hughes

In many parts of Europe, including England and France, the Biblically derived right to glean the fields was reserved for the poor; a right, enforceable by law, that continued in parts of Europe into modern times.

In 18th century England, gleaning was a legal right for "cottagers", or landless residents. In a small village the sexton would often ring a church bell at eight o'clock in the morning and again at seven in the evening to tell the gleaners when to begin and end work. This legal right effectively ended after the Steel v Houghton decision in 1788.

== Modern times ==
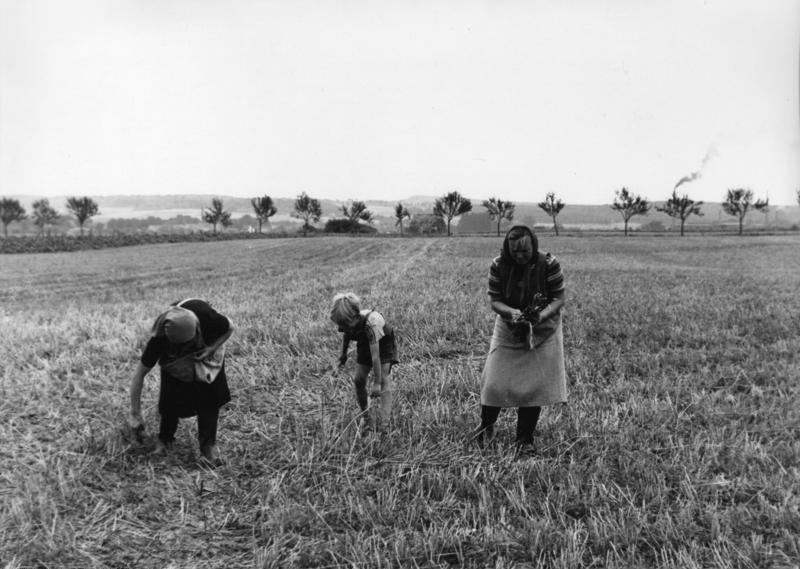
Impoverished Germans gleaning in 1956

In addition to supermarkets, gleaning can also occur at farms in the field. Volunteers, called gleaners, visit a farm where the farmer donates what is left in their fields to collect and donate to a food bank. In New York State in 2010, this form of gleaning alone rescued 3.6 million pounds of fruits and vegetables.

In the Soviet Union, the Law of Spikelets (sometimes translated "law on gleaning") criminalised gleaning, under penalty of death, or 10 years of forced labour in exceptional circumstances. In the U.S., the Bill Emerson Good Samaritan Act of 1996 limited the liability of donors to instances of gross negligence or intentional misconduct, alleviating gleaning from much of the risk that was allegedly hampering the delivery of surplus food from restaurants and dining facilities to emergency food centers. The law preempts state Good Samaritan Acts, that provide less protection.

The Shulchan Aruch argues that Jewish farmers are no longer obliged to obey the biblical rule. Nevertheless, in modern Israel, rabbis of Orthodox Judaism insist that Jews allow gleanings to be consumed by the poor and by strangers during Sabbatical years. On the island of Bali, traditional law allows fruit from a tree to be picked by the passerby from the ground—even if the tree is on privately owned land.

Currently, gleaning is often practiced by humanitarian and social groups which distribute the gleaned food to the poor and hungry; in a modern context, this can include the collection of food from supermarkets at the end of the day that would otherwise be thrown away. There are a number of organizations that practice gleaning to resolve issues of societal hunger; the Society of St. Andrew and the Boston Area Gleaners, for example.

In the United States there are also laws that support and sanction gleaning and the National Gleaning Project, created by the Center for Agriculture and Food Systems at Vermont Law and Graduate School connected modern gleaning and food recovery organizations across the United States while providing related policy and law resources, and examples of handbooks, waivers, and other documents organizations may utilize. These laws allow corporations to receive grants for the use of gleaning, mandates the agriculture sector to financially sustain gleaning nationally, and sanctions the distribution of the vegetables harvested from gleaning. In 2020, there were 143 gleaning organizations in the United States and Canada combined, harvesting anywhere from 163,000-5.2 million pounds of food gleaned in the year.

== Gleaning in art ==
Gleaning was a popular subject in art, especially in the nineteenth century. Gleaning in rural France has been represented in the paintings Des Glaneuses (1857) by Jean-François Millet and Le rappel des glaneuses (1859) by Jules Breton, and explored in a 2000 documentary/experimental film, The Gleaners and I, by Agnès Varda. Vincent van Gogh's sketch of a Peasant Woman Gleaning in Nuenen, The Netherlands (1885) is in the Charles Clore collection.

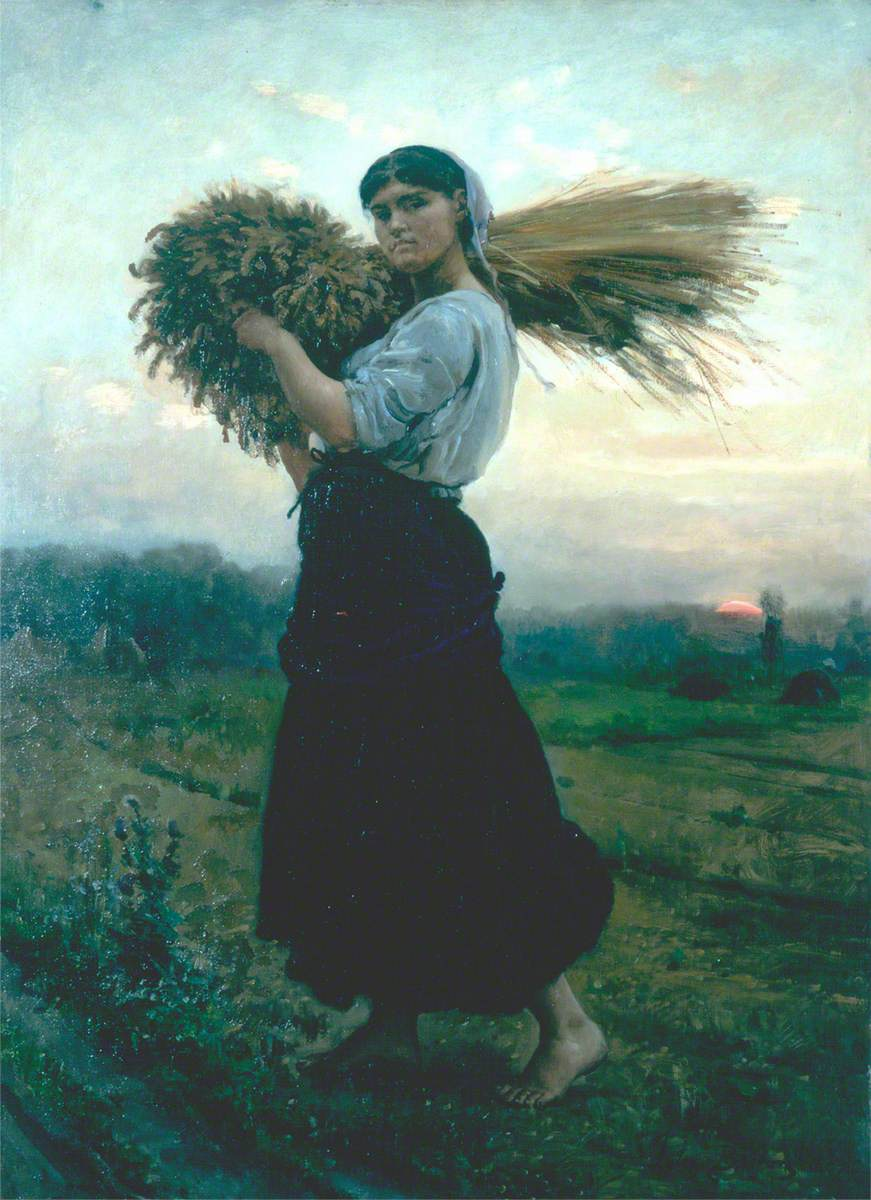
Jules Breton, The Gleaner, 1875, Aberdeen Art Gallery

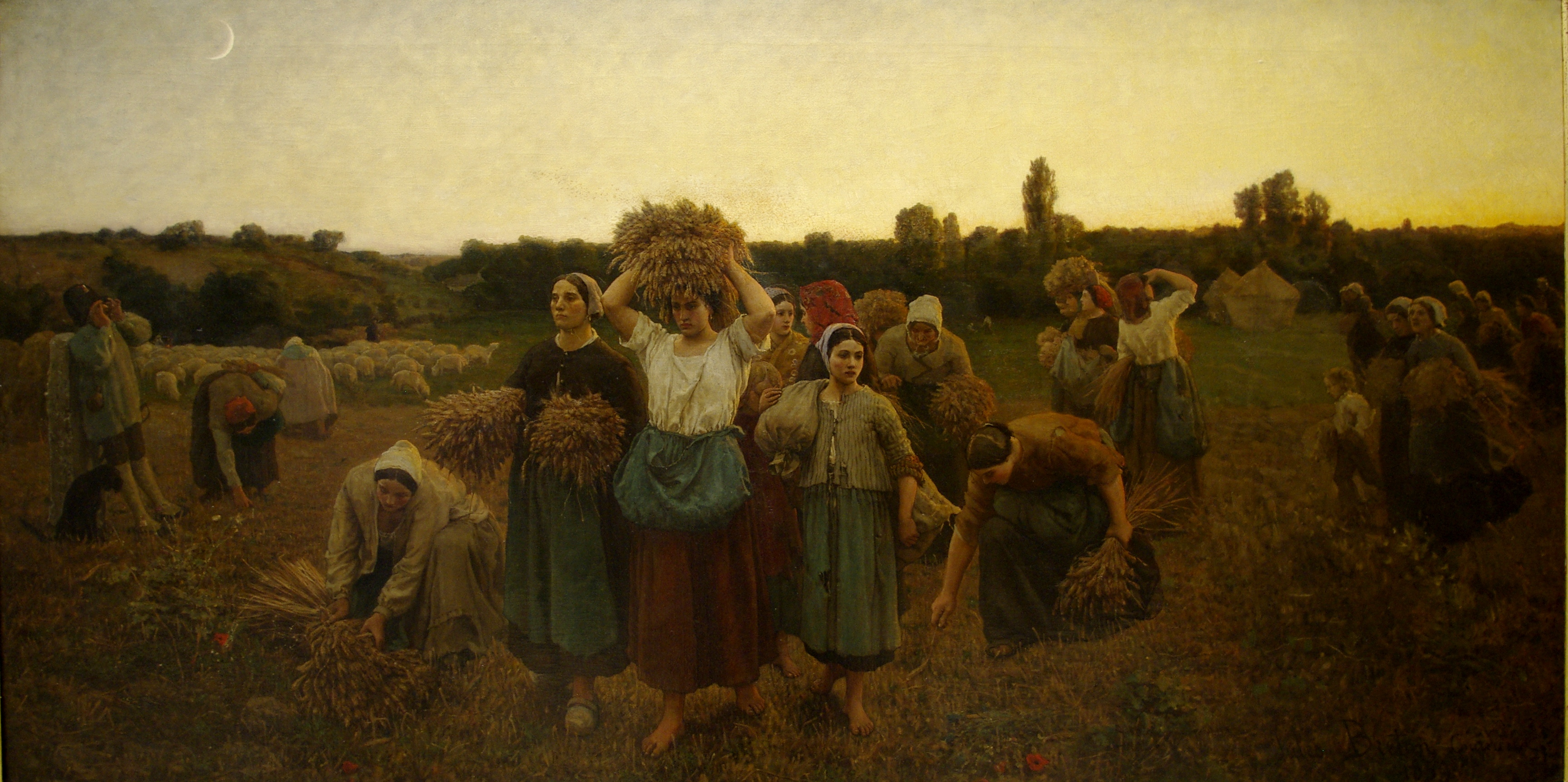
Jules Breton, Le Rappel des glaneuses, 1859

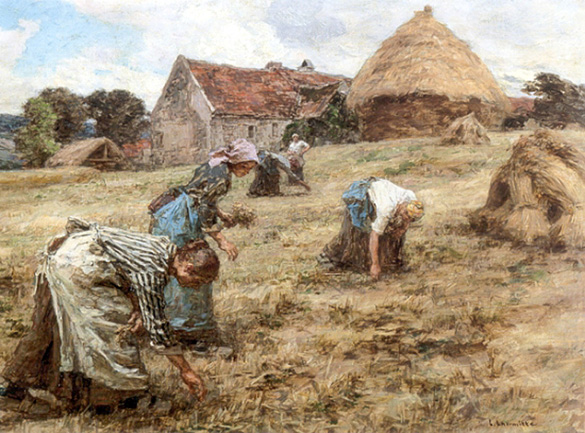
Léon Augustin Lhermitte, Les glaneuses, 1898

== Woolgathering ==
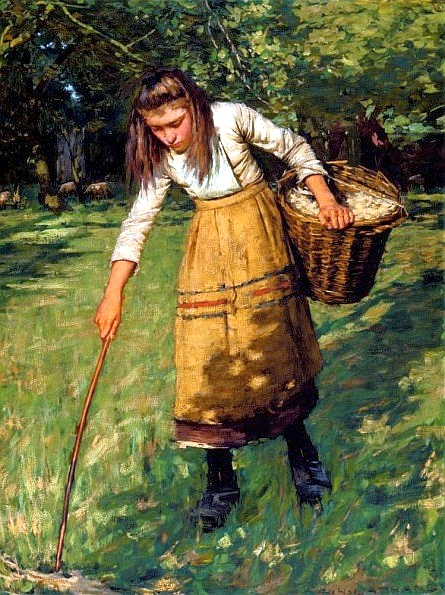
Gathering Wool by Henry Herbert La Thangue

Woolgathering is a practice similar to gleaning, but for wool. The practice was of collecting bits of wool that had gotten caught on bushes and fences or fallen on the ground as sheep passed by. The meandering perambulations of a woolgatherer give rise to the idiomatic sense of the word as meaning aimless wandering of the mind.

== Fishing ==
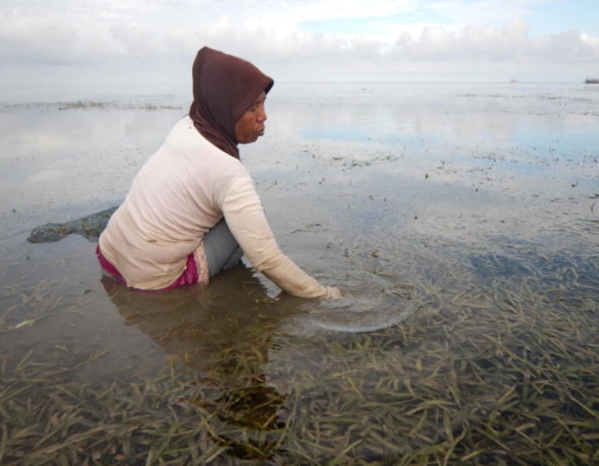
Gleaning in a seagrass meadow

Along marine coastlines, gleaning has been defined as "fishing with basic gear, including bare hands, in shallow water not deeper than that one can stand". Invertebrate gleaning (walking) fisheries are common within coastal (intertidal) ecosystems globally, contributing to the food supply of coastal communities.

== Ecological gleaning ==
The term gleaning is also applied to modes of feeding which involve taking food from surfaces. For example, in Australia pardalotes (small songbirds) are renowned for their feeding on lerps, scale insects on Eucalyptus sp. leaves.

Many fish forage by picking off small food items from hard surfaces, another example of ecological gleaning.

== See also ==
- Canner (recycling)
- Dumpster diving
- Food bank
- Food rescue
- Food salvage
- Freeganism
- Tzedakah
- Usufruct
- Waste picker
