= Charles Mitchell (legal scholar) =

English legal academic

Charles Christopher James Mitchell FBA KC (Hon) (born 14 May 1965) is a British legal scholar acknowledged as one of the leading common-law experts on the English law of restitution of unjust enrichment and the law of trusts. He is the author of two leading textbooks and one practitioner's book. He is currently Professor of Law at University College London and Senior Associate Research Fellow at the Institute of Advanced Legal Studies.

== Career ==
Mitchell completed his PhD at University College London and was supervised by Peter Birks. Until 2008 he worked at King's College London, before spending a year as Professor of Property Law at Jesus College, Oxford.

Mitchell was also previously general editor of the King's Law Journal.

== Personal life ==
In April 1992, Mitchell married The Honourable Dr Charlotte Lennox-Boyd, daughter of Simon Lennox-Boyd, 2nd Viscount Boyd of Merton and the former Alice Clive. Dr Charlotte Mitchell is Honorary Senior Lecturer at UCL's Department of English. They have three children.

== Honours ==
In July 2017, Mitchell was elected a Fellow of the British Academy (FBA), the United Kingdom's national academy for the humanities and social sciences.

== Publications ==
=== Books ===
- Goff and Jones on the Law of Unjust Enrichment (9th edn Sweet & Maxwell 2016) (editor with Stephen Watterson and Paul Mitchell)
- Hayton and Mitchell's Commentary and Cases on the Law of Trusts and Equitable Remedies (13th edn Sweet & Maxwell 2010)
- Landmark Cases in Equity (OUP, 2012). (with Paul Mitchell)
- Landmark Cases in the Law of Contract (Hart, 2008), Ch.13, Johnson v Agnew (with Paul Mitchell)
- Landmark Cases in the Law of Restitution (Hart, 2006), essays on legal history. (with Paul Mitchell)
- Subrogation: Law and Practice (OUP, 2007) Ed. (with Stephen Watterson)
- Underhill and Hayton's Law Relating to Trusts and Trustees (Butterworths, 2006) 17th edn (winner of the Society of Trusts and Estates Practitioners’ Book of the Year Award for 2007 (with David Hayton and Paul Matthews)
- The Law of Contribution and Reimbursement (OUP, 2003)

=== Articles ===
- ‘Recovery of Compound Interest as Restitution or Damages’ (2008) 71 Modern Law Review 290
- ‘Liability Chains’ in Simone Degeling and James Edelman (eds) Restitution in Commercial Law (Thomson, 2008)
