= Restitution in English law =

The English law of Restitution is the law of gain-based recovery. Its precise scope and underlying principles remain a matter of significant academic and judicial controversy. Broadly speaking, the law of restitution concerns actions in which one person claims an entitlement in respect of a gain acquired by another, rather than compensation for a loss.

== Framework ==
Many academic commentators have sought to impose structure upon the law of restitution by searching for a common rationale and constructing taxonomies of the various types of claim. Whether such frameworks can account for the diverse range of restitutionary claims remains a controversial question. The implications of such frameworks for the relationship between law and Equity has often been a significant flashpoint in academic and judicial debate.

As the law currently stands, the law of restitution can be usefully divided into (at least) three broad categories:

- Restitution for unjust enrichment
- Restitution for wrongs
- Restitution to vindicate property rights

Outside of these categories exist a range of doctrines which also provide restitutionary or analogous remedies. Academic commentators have sought to rationalise these in terms of unjust enrichment, with various degrees of success. It is now generally accepted that unjust enrichment has a part to play in the doctrine of subrogation. Actions for recoupment (historically speaking, an action for money paid to the defendant's use) and contribution have also been said to reverse unjust enrichment. Certain statutory frameworks providing for restitutionary remedies have been said to rest on the principle of unjust enrichment.

== Restitution for unjust enrichment ==
Where one person has acquired a benefit at the expense of another in circumstances which are unjust and there are no applicable defences, the law imposes an obligation upon the latter person to make restitution. In short, a claimant will have a prima facie action where:

- The defendant has been enriched.
- This enrichment has been at the claimant's expense.
- This enrichment at the claimant's expense is unjust.
- There is no applicable defence.

The historical core of restitutionary claims to reverse unjust enrichment lies in the law of quasi-contract. These were personal common law actions. In English law, the doctrinal basis of such claims is now said to be unjust enrichment. With this abstraction has come attempts - with varying degrees of success and controversy - to expand the explanatory power of the principle of unjust enrichment. Examples of the types of claim now falling within the modern English law of unjust enrichment include:

- Actions to recover mistaken payments
- Actions to recover money paid on a total failure of consideration
- Actions to recover money paid under duress
- Actions for the reasonable value of services provided to the defendant (quantum meruit)
- Actions for the reasonable value of goods provided at the request of the defendant (quantum valebat)
- Actions to recover money paid to the defendant's use (recoupment claims)

== Restitution for wrongs ==
Restitution for wrongs refers to a remedy where a gain can be taken away (or 'stripped', 'disgorged', etc.) from a defendant who has committed a wrong, either a tort, breach of contract, breach of fiduciary duty or breach of confidence.

=== Torts ===
==== Proprietary torts ====
- United Australia Ltd v Barclays Bank Ltd
- Phillips v Homfray (1883)
- Edwards v Lee's Administrators
- Penarth Dock Engineering Co Ltd v Pounds
- Bracewell v Appleby
- Stoke-on-Trent City Council v W&J Wass Ltd
- Ministry of Defence v Ashman
- Jaggard v Sawyer

==== Intellectual property torts ====
- Colbeam Plamer Ltd v Stock Affiliates Pty Ltd
- Patents Act 1977 ss 61-62
- Copyright, Designs and Patents Act 1988 ss 96-97, 191I-J, 229 and 233

==== Non-proprietary torts ====
- Halifax Building Society v Thomas
- Law Commission, Aggravated, Exemplary and Restitutionary Damages (1997) No 247
- Draft Bill clauses 12(1), (5) and 15(6)

=== Breach of contract ===
- Wrotham Park Estate Co Ltd v Parkside Homes Ltd
- Attorney General v Blake
- Experience Hendrix LLC v PPX Enterprises Inc
- World Wide Fund for Nature v World Wrestling Federation Entertainment Inc

=== Breach of fiduciary duty ===
- Regal (Hastings) Ltd v Gulliver
- Boardman v Phipps
- Murad v Al-Saraj
- Reading v Attorney-General
- Attorney-General for Hong Kong v Reid
- Daraydan Holdings Ltd v Solland International Ltd

=== Breach of confidence ===
- Attorney General v Guardian Newspapers (No 2)
- LAC Minerals Ltd v International Corona Resources Ltd

== Counter restitution ==
In circumstances where one party is claiming recovery of the benefits the other party has unjustly obtained, counter restitution refers to the obligation of the party claiming recovery to repay any benefits they themselves have obtained. Where this party has obtained benefits which cannot be repaid, and therefore counter restitution is impossible, then their claim for recovery of benefits will be barred.

== See also ==
- English unjust enrichment
