= Dutton v Poole (1678) =

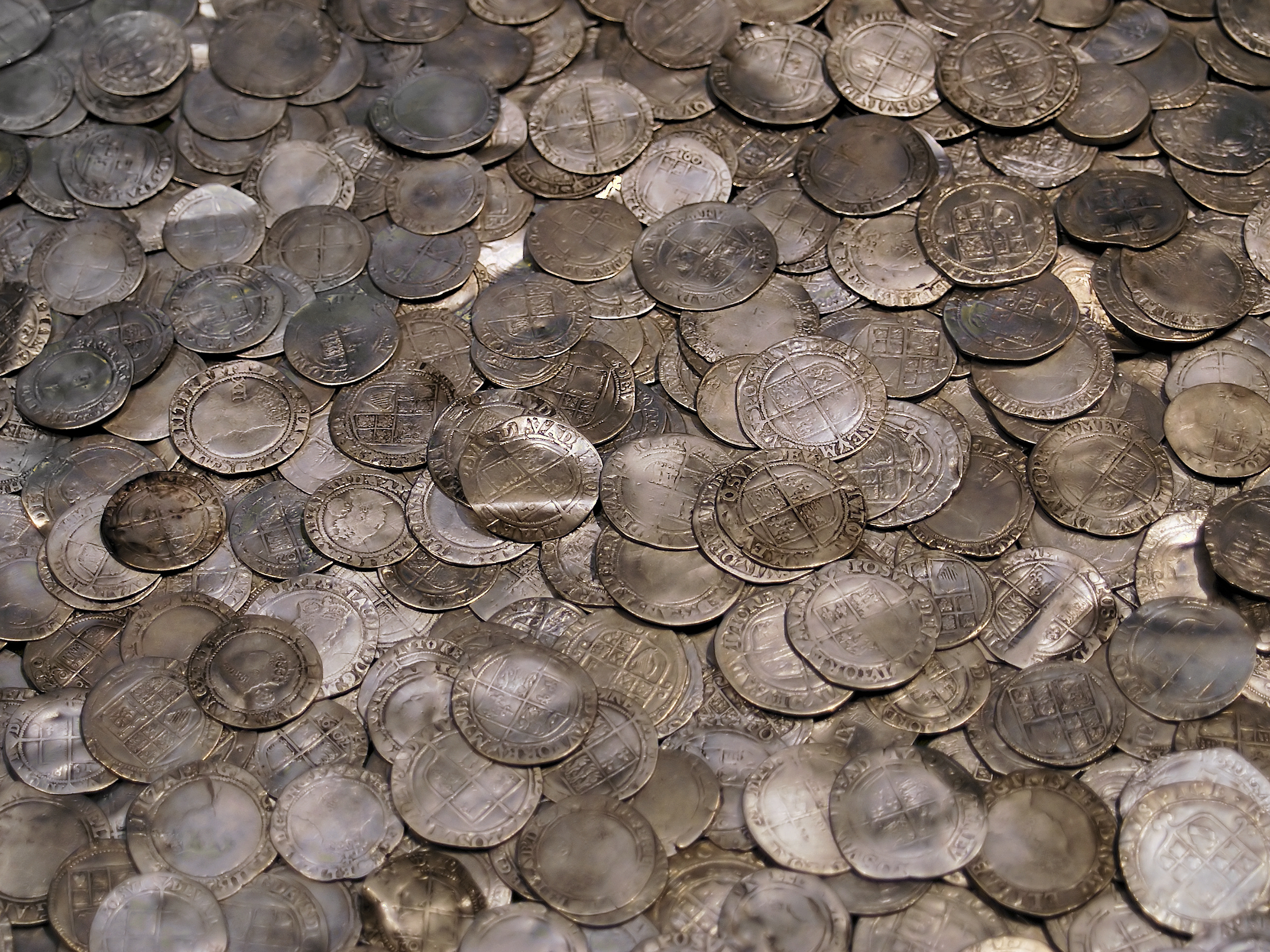
- Court: Court of King's Bench
- Decided: 1678
- Citation: 2 Lev 211

Case history
- Subsequent action: Dutton v Poole CEC (1679) T Raym 302, 83 ER 156 (Chancery Division)

Court membership
- Judge sitting: Sir William Scroggs C.J.

Keywords
- Privity, third parties, consideration, specific performance

Dutton v Poole (1678) is a landmark decision in the Court of Chancery.

It established the rule that privity of contract coupled with lack of consideration preclude third-party suits for breach of a contract, but made an exception to the rule in close family relationships. This exception was not generally followed in subsequent contract cases, but the issue has not been addressed by the Contracts (Rights of Third Parties) Act 1999.

== Facts ==
In this case a son contracted with his father not to fell and sell the timber from their oak wood which the son would then inherit, and in exchange, he would pay £1000 to his sister on her marriage. The sister married after the father's death, and the son refused to make good the promised sum (equivalent to £173,000 in 2023).

== Decision of court of law and of the court of equity ==
In this case Scroggs C.J. with strong reasons permitted the sister to appeal from the decision of a more junior judge of his court despite her not being a party to the contract (privity of contract), on the basis that she was a close family member. Scroggs held that "apparent consideration of love and affection from the father to his children [means] the consideration and promise to the father may well extend to the children."

An appeal by the son to the Court of Chancery (i.e. in the then sometimes conflicting domain of the law, the courts of equity) reinforced the determination for his sister. The decision was confirmed in Martyn v Hind and cited in Drive Yourself Hire Co v Strutt.

== Exception to privity of contract ==
This exception was for almost a century from 1884 considered not part of the common law, and was directly refuted in Tweddle v Atkinson (1861).

The Judicial Committee of the House of Lords in Beswick v Beswick achieved a similar effect by allowing executor-claimants seeking equity's assistance to enforce promises to pay them indirectly contained in contracts between third parties and the deceased. The leading judges expressed regret that legislation had not loosened the doctrine (which took place 32 years later in 1999).

== See also ==
- English contract law
- Tweddle v Atkinson (1861) 1 B&S 393, the traditional rule of privity
- Dunlop Pneumatic Tyre Co Ltd v Selfridge & Co Ltd [1915] AC 847, affirming the privity rule 250 years later in a resale price maintenance case.
- Sprat v Agar
- The Physicians case
