= Smith and Snipes Hall Farm Ltd v River Douglas Catchment Board =

1949 English land law decision

Smith v River Douglas Catchment Board
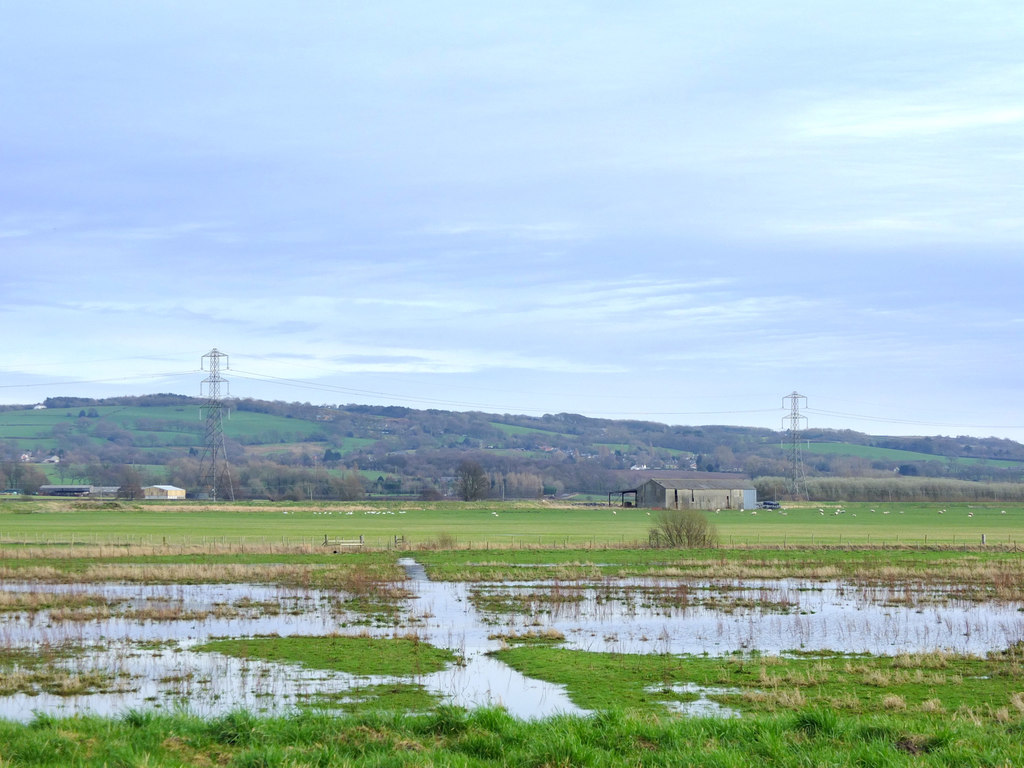
- A swathe of this land flooded. Its engineered (straightened) brook had defences poorly installed. It was sown with crops which were ruined.
- Court: Court of Appeal
- Decided: 3 June 1949
- Citation: [1949] 2 KB 500, [1949] 2 All ER 179

Smith and Snipes Hall Farm Ltd v River Douglas Catchment Board [1949] 2 KB 500 is an English land law and English contract law appeal decision. The case, decided by Denning LJ, confirmed positive covenants can supplant privity of contract in contracts to improve land and secondly a covenant should be implied where the contract shows an intention that the obligation would attach to the land. The case thirdly held in that context, a somewhat uncertain description of lands which was capable of being rendered certain by extrinsic evidence was sufficient to enforce the covenant.

== Facts ==
The River Douglas Catchment Board agreed with a number of landowners of certain westerly land between the River Douglas and the Leeds and Liverpool Canal to carry out some work if some contribution to the cost was given. In 1940 Mrs S, one of the covenantees, sold her land ("Low Meadows") to Smith, which incorporated Snipes Hall Farm Ltd in 1944 as his agricultural tenant. In Autumn 1946 the Eller Brook burst its banks and flooded Smith and Snipes Hall Farm land. They made a claim against the Board for damages in breach of contract (and in tort, not considered on the facts).

== Legal questions arising ==
There was never any question that the main damage was suffered by the tenant and the tenant had the same locus standi as the landlord, exercising under a lease from time to time his legal rights. The question of liability in tort was not considered, instead a few words were said if that question had to be considered by the court (obiter dicta). The question was whether not having been privy to the original agreement was a bar to any recovery.

== Judgment ==
The Court of Appeal all held that the Board was in breach of contract, and that breach caused damage to the farm. The agreement showed the intention that the obligation would attach to the land, and it would not matter whose hands the land came into: the owner could enforce the covenant. Because the covenant ran with the land, under section 78 Law of Property Act 1925 it could be enforced by the covenantee and successors in title. Denning LJ's notable decision went as follows.

There is in Lancashire a river called Eller Brook, which is liable to overflow its banks and flood the adjoining land. In 1938, in order to prevent the flooding, eleven owners of land through which the river ran made an agreement with the local catchment board, whereby the board undertook to widen, deepen and make good the banks of the river, and thereafter to maintain them, and the landowners paid a contribution towards the cost. The board did the work and practically completed it by 1940, but they did it so unskilfully that, in the opinion of experts, it was from the first doomed to failure. The landowners, of course, did not know this and set about cultivating the land. The low meadows, which had been rough marshland, were broken up and brought under the plough. Crops were sown and harvested. But the banks of the river were not strong enough to stand serious floods. In 1944 they burst. The breach on that occasion was soon closed, but the board's engineer was aware of the danger. He reported to the board that "the bank is a bad one under any conditions." In 1945 there was another burst nearby, and he reported that "this bank is largely composed of sand. I propose to put a machine on to strengthen it as soon as one is available." But apparently he did nothing, or at any rate nothing effective. The landowners and their tenants went on cultivating the land. They did not know that the banks were doomed to failure. Then in 1946 the worst happened. Serious floods arose, the banks burst, the fields were flooded, and the crops ruined. This action is brought by a tenant of the fields against the board to recover the value of the crops he has lost. The present owner joins in the action, claiming his loss of rent, but the substantial claim is by the tenant company.

On those facts it is my opinion that the board broke their contract. It was an implied term that they should do the work with reasonable care and skill, so as to make the banks reasonably fit for the purpose of preventing flooding. The proper way of doing this, according to the experts, was to put a clay core in the banks, or to make them very much wider, but they did not do either. It may be that the board had not sufficient funds available to carry out such works; but that seems to me to be an irrelevant consideration, or, at any rate, just as irrelevant in the case of a public board as in the case of a private contractor. No private contractor who was engaged to make works for a specific purpose could excuse himself for bad results by saying that he had not sufficient money to erect proper works. It follows, therefore, that if the original landowner with whom the agreement was made had himself cultivated the fields, and suffered damage by the breach, he could recover from the board. But he sold the land and he has suffered no damage. The damage has been suffered partly by the man who purchased the land, but principally by the tenants, and the question is whether they can sue on the contract.

Mr. Nield says that the plaintiffs cannot sue. He says that there is no privity of contract between them and the board, and that it is a fundamental principle that no one can sue upon a contract to which he is not a party. That argument can be met either by admitting the principle and saying that it does not apply to this case, or by disputing the principle itself. I make so bold as to dispute it. The principle is not nearly so fundamental as it is sometimes supposed to be. It did not become rooted in our law until the year 1861 (Tweddle v Atkinson, and reached its full growth in 1915 (Dunlop v Selfridge). It has never been able entirely to supplant another principle whose roots go much deeper. I mean the principle that a man who makes a deliberate promise which is intended to be binding, that is to say, under seal or for good consideration, must keep his promise; and the court will hold him to it, not only at the suit of the party who gave the consideration, but also at the suit of one who was not a party to the contract, provided that it was made for his benefit and that he has a sufficient interest to entitle him to enforce it, subject always, of course, to any defences that may be open on the merits. It is upon this principle, implicit if not expressed (i.) that the courts, ever since 1368, have held that a covenant made with the owner of land for its benefit can be enforced against the covenantor, not only by the original party, but also by his successors in title. (See The Prior's case, which is set out by Lord Coke in his work on Littleton, at p. 384a, and in his report of Spencer's Case); (ii.) that the Courts of Common Law in the seventeenth and eighteenth centuries repeatedly enforced promises expressly made in favour of an interested person; (See Dutton v Poole, approved by Lord Mansfield in Martyn v Hind); (iii.) that Lord Mansfield held that an undisclosed principal is entitled to sue on a contract made by his agent for his benefit, even though nothing was said about agency in the contract; (See Rabone v Williams cited in George v Clagett); and (iv.) that Lord Hardwicke decided that a third person is entitled to sue if there can be spelt out of the contract an intention by one of the parties to contract as trustee for him, even though nothing was said about any trust in the contract, and there was no trust fund to be administered. (See Tomlinson v Gill.)

Throughout the history of the principle the difficulty has been, of course, to say what is sufficient interest to entitle the third person to recover. It has sometimes been supposed that there must always be something in the nature of a "trust" for his benefit. (See Vandepitte's case.) But this is an elusive test which does not explain all the cases, and it involves the trustee being made a nominal party to the action either as plaintiff or defendant, unless that formality is dispensed with, as it was in Les Affréteurs Réunis Société Anonyme v Leopold Walford Ltd. The truth is that the principle is not so limited. It may be difficult to define what is a sufficient interest. Whilst it does not include the maintenance of prices to the public disadvantage, it does cover the protection of the legitimate property, rights and interests of the third person, although no agency or trust for him can be inferred. It covers, therefore, rights such as these which cannot justly be denied; the right of a seller to enforce a commercial credit issued in his favour by a bank, under contract with the buyer; the right of a widow to sue for a pension which her husband's employers promised to pay her under contract with him; (See Dutton v Poole and cf. In re Schebsman); or the right of a man's servants and guests to claim on an insurance policy, taken out by him against loss by burglary which is expressed to cover them; cf Prudential Staff Union v Hall. In some cases the legislature itself has intervened, as, for instance, to give the driver of a motor car the right to sue on an insurance policy taken out by the owner which is expressed to cover the driver. But this does not mean that the common law would not have reached the same result by itself.

The particular application of the principle with which we are concerned here is the case of covenants made with the owner of the land to which they relate. The law on this subject was fully expounded by Mr. Smith in his note to Spencer's Case which has always been regarded as authoritative. Such covenants are clearly intended, and usually expressed, to be for the benefit of whomsoever should be the owner of the land for the time being; and at common law each successive owner has a sufficient interest to sue because he holds the same estate as the original owner. The reason which Lord Coke gave for this rule is the reason which underlies the whole of the principle now under consideration. He said in his work upon Littleton that it was "to give damages to the party grieved." If a successor in title were not allowed to sue it would mean that the covenantor could break his contract with impunity, for it is clear that the original owner, after he has parted with the land, could recover no more than nominal damages for any breach that occurred thereafter. It was always held, however, at common law that, in order that a successor in title should be entitled to sue, he must be of the same estate as the original owner. That alone was a sufficient interest to entitle him to enforce the contract. The covenant was supposed to be made for the benefit of the owner and his successors in title, and not for the benefit of anyone else. This limitation, however, was, as is pointed out in Smith's Leading Cases, capable of being "productive of very serious and disagreeable consequences," and it has been removed by s. 78 of the Law of Property Act 1925, which provides that a covenant relating to any land of the covenantee shall be deemed to be made with the covenantee and his successors in title, "and the persons deriving title under him or them" and shall have effect as if such successors "and other persons" were expressed.

The covenant of the catchment board in this case clearly relates to the land of the covenantees. It was a covenant to do work on the land for the benefit of the land. By the statute, therefore, it is to be deemed to be made, not only with the original owner, but also with the purchasers of the land and their tenants as if they were expressed. Now if they were expressed, it would be clear that the covenant was made for their benefit; and they clearly have sufficient interest to entitle them to enforce it because they have suffered the damage. The result is that the plaintiffs come within the principle whereby a person interested can sue on a contract expressly made for his benefit.

I would not wish to leave this subject without referring also to s. 56 of the Law of Property Act, 1925, which says that a person may take the benefit of any covenant or agreement respecting land or other property, although he may not be named as a party to the instrument. That section is no doubt, as Lord Greene has said, confined to cases when the person seeking to take advantage of it is a person "within the benefit" of the covenant or agreement; (See White v Bijou Mansions); but, subject to that limitation, there is no reason why the section should not be given its full scope, just as Lord Dunedin was prepared to give full scope to its narrower predecessor, s. 5 of the Real Property Act 1845. (See Dyson v Forster.) Section 56 means, therefore, that a person may enforce an agreement respecting property made for his benefit, although he was not a party to it. So construed it is a clear statutory recognition of the principle to which I have referred and it is applicable to this case. If the principle had been canvassed in In re Miller's Agreement, it should, I think have been held there that the daughters had a right at common law to sue for their pension, a right which was reinforced by s. 56. I cannot believe that the covenantors there could break their contract with impunity. So much for the question of principle.

Mr. Nield did urge that the benefit of the covenant should not run with the land here because there was no clearly defined piece of land to which it was attached. It is true that the agreement did not describe the lands by metes and bounds, but it did give a description of them which was capable of being rendered certain by extrinsic evidence; and that is sufficient. Id certum est quod certum reddi potest. Mr. Nield also argued that there was no servient tenement. But that is only material when there is a question whether the burden of a covenant runs with the land. This is a question of the benefit running, and ever since The Prior's case it has been held that the covenantor is liable because of his covenant given to the owner of the dominant tenement and not because of his relationship to any servient tenement. In my opinion, therefore, the board are liable to the plaintiffs in damages for breach of covenant. It is thus unnecessary to consider whether they are liable in tort, but I will add a word about it. The decision of the House of Lords, in the East Suffolk case, shows that, in the absence of a contract, a catchment board is under no duty to exercise its powers with efficiency or dispatch or at all; but it also shows that if it does exercise its powers it must use reasonable care not to injure persons likely to be affected by its operations. The present case is very different from that one, because here the landowners, in consequence of the works done by the board, ploughed up the land and cultivated the fields; and in the result suffered damage which they would not have done if the board had done nothing, for in that case they would have had no crops there. The decision of the House of Lords does show, however, that, in considering whether the board broke its duty in tort, it is material to inquire into the expense of the works which it is said they ought to have constructed. An adjacent landowner must not be too critical if the board prefers thrift to efficiency, I suppose on the principle that he should not look a gift horse in the mouth and must be prepared to take it with some faults. But the duty in contract is a very different thing. There is no question of a gift horse there. The landowner paid his contribution in return for the board's promise, and they are in duty bound to fulfil it. I agree, therefore, that the appeal should be allowed.

== See also ==
- English contract law
- English property law
- English tort law
- Beswick v Beswick
