= Third-party beneficiary =

Type of beneficiary under contract law

A third-party beneficiary, in the civil law of contracts, is a person who may have the right to sue on a contract, despite not having originally been an active party to the contract. This right, known as a ius quaesitum tertio, arises when the third party (tertius or alteri) is the intended beneficiary of the contract, as opposed to a mere incidental beneficiary (penitus extraneus). It vests when the third party relies on or assents to the relationship, and gives the third party the right to sue either the promisor (promittens, or performing party) or the promisee (stipulans, or anchor party) of the contract, depending on the circumstances under which the relationship was created.

A contract made in favor of a third party is known as a "third-party beneficiary contract." Under traditional common law, the ius quaesitum tertio principle was not recognized, instead relying on the doctrine of privity of contract, which restricts rights, obligations, and liabilities arising from a contract to the contracting parties (said to be privy to the contract). However, the Contracts (Rights of Third Parties) Act 1999 introduced a number of allowances and exceptions for ius quaesitum tertio in English law. Other common-law countries are also making reforms in this area, though the United States is unique in abandoning privity early in the mid-19th century.

== Ius quaesitum tertio ==
While the law on this subject varies, there is nonetheless a commonly accepted construction of third-party rights in the laws of most countries. A right of action arises only when it appears the object of the contract was to benefit the third party's interests and the third-party beneficiary has either relied on or accepted the benefit. A promisee nominates a third party usually for one of two reasons—either the promisee owes something to the third party and the performance of this new obligation will discharge it, or the promisee will somehow get a material benefit by giving something to the third party.

There are also two possible ways to explain the functioning of the contractual relationship: either,

- The parties A (promisee) and B (promisor) contract each in his own name but with the intention of creating an opportunity for C (third-party beneficiary) to acquire a benefit, conditional upon acceptance, from B; or
- C immediately acquires a conditional right, from which A is able to release B until the moment of acceptance, when the right of A to release B is extinguished.

In either case, a third-party contract differs from agency in that the promisee acts in his own name and for himself, whereas an agent or representative does not. It is also distinguishable from a promesse de porte-fort under which the third party has a negative obligation to perform and, by expressing his consent, initially substitutes himself for an intended party to a contract and therefore binds himself. Also, as a somewhat distinct rule, the intended beneficiary of a third-party contract does not need to be in existence at the time the contract is concluded. This means a contract may benefit an unborn person (usually a family member) or secure benefits for a legal person, such as a company, still in the process of forming or registering.

=== Object to benefit ===
For third-party rights to come into existence, certain contractual criteria must be met to show an object to benefit:

- A valid contract must exist between two contracting parties and not some other relationship
- The contracting parties must have intended to confer a benefit, and not a simple interest, to a third party, either expressly or impliedly
- The third-party beneficiary must be named or referred to, or is a member of a distinct class referred to
- The intention to benefit must generally be irrevocable (though a life insurance policy is an exception)
- Some intimation to the third party of the contract's existence

=== Irrevocability ===
To be enforceable, a ius quaesitum tertio must be irrevocable. This is established by any of the following:

- Delivery of the contract to the third party
- Registration for publication
- Intimation to the third party
- The third party coming under onerous obligations on the faith of having a ius quaesitum tertio
- Evidence that the third party knew of the provision intended for his or her benefit

=== Acceptance ===
A third-party beneficiary only acquires a right of action to enforce his benefit once he has accepted the benefit provided for in the contract. Under the South African interpretation, however, prior to formal acceptance of the benefit, the third-party beneficiary only has a spes, or expectation; in other words, he does not have the right to accept, but rather a mere competency. Acceptance may also be a suspensive condition in certain contracts. Under Scots law, acceptance is not necessary to be vested in a right of action, but is necessary to be liable. Before acceptance, however, the ius quaesitum tertio is tenuous so that acceptance of a benefit does not create a right, but rather entrenches that right. In either case, the contracting parties may vary or rescind the contract until acceptance or reliance.

== Intended v. incidental beneficiary ==
In order for a third party beneficiary to have any rights under the contract, he must be an intended beneficiary, as opposed to an incidental beneficiary. The burden is on the third party to plead and prove that he was indeed an intended beneficiary.

=== Incidental beneficiary ===
An incidental beneficiary is a party who stands to benefit from the execution of the contract, although that was not the intent of either contracting party. For example, if Andrew hires Bethany to renovate his house and insists that she use a specific house painter, Charlie, because he has an excellent reputation, then Charlie is an incidental beneficiary. Neither Andrew nor Bethany is entering into the contract with the particular intent to benefit Charlie. Andrew simply wants his house properly renovated; Bethany simply wants to be paid to do the renovation. If the contract is breached by either party in a way that results in Charlie never being hired for the job, Charlie nonetheless has no rights to recover anything under the contract. Similarly, if Andrew were to promise to buy Bethany a Cadillac, and were to later go back on that promise, General Motors would have no grounds upon which to recover for the lost sale.

=== Intended beneficiary ===
The distinction that creates an intended beneficiary is that one party—the "promisee"—makes an agreement to provide some consideration to a second party—the "promisor"—in exchange for the promisor's agreement to provide some product or service to the third-party beneficiary named in the contract. The promisee must have an intention to benefit the third party (though this requirement has an unusual meaning under the law). Although there is a presumption that the promisor intends to promote the interests of the third party in this way, if Andrew contracts with Bethany to have a thousand killer bees delivered to the home of Andrew's worst enemy Charlie, then Charlie is still considered to be the intended beneficiary of that contract. (This would be illegal if the intent was to scare his enemy; contracts are voided based on criminality.)

There are two common situations involving intended beneficiaries:

- Creditor beneficiary – e.g., when Andrew owes some debt to Charlie, and Andrew agrees to provide some consideration to Bethany in exchange for her promise to pay Charlie some of the debt
- Donee beneficiary – e.g., when Andrew wishes to make a gift to Charlie and Andrew agrees to provide some consideration to Bethany in exchange for her promise to pay Charlie the amount of the gift. Under old common law principles, the donee beneficiary actually had a greater claim to the benefits this created, but such distinctions have been abolished.

== Vesting of rights ==
Once the beneficiary's rights have vested, the original parties to the contract are both bound to perform the contract. Any efforts by the promisor or the promisee to rescind or modify the contract at that point are void. Indeed, if the promisee changed his mind and offered to pay the promisor money not to perform, the third party could sue the promisee for tortious interference with the third party's contract rights.

There are four ways to determine whether the third party beneficiary's rights have vested:

1. If the beneficiary knows of and has detrimentally relied on the rights created;
2. If the beneficiary expressly assented to the contract at the request of one of the parties;
3. If the beneficiary files a lawsuit to enforce the contract; or
4. If the beneficiary's rights vest pursuant to an express term in the contract providing for such vesting.

== Breach and defenses ==
Where a contract for the benefit of a third party is breached by the non-performance of the promisor, the beneficiary can sue the promisor for the breach just as any party to a contract can sue the other. Because the rights of the third party are defined by the contract created between the promisor and the promisee, the promisor may assert against the beneficiary any defenses to the contract that could be asserted against the promisee. These include all of the traditional basis by which the formation of a contract may be challenged (e.g., lack of capacity, lack of consideration, the statute of frauds) and all of the traditional bases by which non-performance on the contract may be excused (e.g., failure of consideration, impossibility, illegality, frustration of purpose).

Because the promisor can assert any defenses that could be asserted against the promisee, the beneficiary also becomes liable for counterclaims on the contract that the promisor could establish against the promisee. This liability can never exceed the amount that the promisor owes under the contract. In other words, if the promisor is owed money by the promisee, any award to the third party for the promisor's failure to perform can be reduced by the amount thus owed. If the promisor is owed more than the value of the contract, the beneficiary's recovery will be reduced to nothing (but the third party can never be made to assume an actual debt).

A creditor beneficiary can sue both the promisor and the promisee, but the beneficiary cannot recover against both. If the suit is successful against one party to the contract, the other party will be dismissed. Because the creditor beneficiary is receiving the performance of the promisor in order to fulfill the promisee's debt, the failure of the promisor to perform means that the beneficiary can still sue the promisee to recover the preexisting debt. The failure of performance simply means that the debt has never been paid.

A donee beneficiary can sue the promisor directly to enforce the promise. (Seaver v. Ransom, 224 NY 233, 120 NE 639 [1918]). A donee beneficiary is when a contract is made expressly for giving a gift to a third party, the third party is known as the donee beneficiary. The most common donee beneficiary contract is a life insurance policy.

In the United States, the Restatement (Second) of Contracts, Chapter 6, Sections 133-147, covers third-party beneficiaries.

== Rights that accrue to the promisee ==
The promisee can also sue the promisor for failing to pay the third party beneficiary. Under the common law, such suits were barred, but courts have since determined that the promisee can sue for specific performance of the contract, provided that the beneficiary has not already sued the promisor. Furthermore, if the promisee was in debt to a creditor beneficiary, and the failure of the promisor to perform caused the promisee to be held liable for that debt, the promisee can sue to recover the amount of the debt.

== Case law ==
Lawrence v. Fox, 1859, decided in the New York Court of Appeals allows a third-party to sue for debt collection.

== See also ==
- Beneficial interest
- Pay it forward
- Assumpsit
- Vesting
