= Tertius (law) =

Tertius is the Latin word for "third", or "concerning the third". The term is used in contract law to refer to an interested third party not privy to a contract.

The English common law system follows the doctrine of privity: there is no recognition of the principle ius quaesitum tertio (a right in the third party to enforce performance) whereby a third party may enforce a promise due unto it under a contract to which it is not a party. However, in several legal systems, including U.S. and Scots contract law, this does not bar parties to a contract from specifying that a third party is to be a beneficiary of such contract. In England itself, as well as Wales and Northern Ireland, the doctrine of privity was reformed by statute in 1999 to enable third parties to enforce contract terms made for their benefit.

In Scots law, the jus quaesitum tertio principle was abolished by the Contract (Third Party Rights) (Scotland) Act 2017 and replaced with a statutory right to enforce or invoke provisions of a contract.

Rights, particularly in property, that ordinarily do accrue to a third party are termed jus tertii.
