= Sprat v Agar =

Spratt v Agar
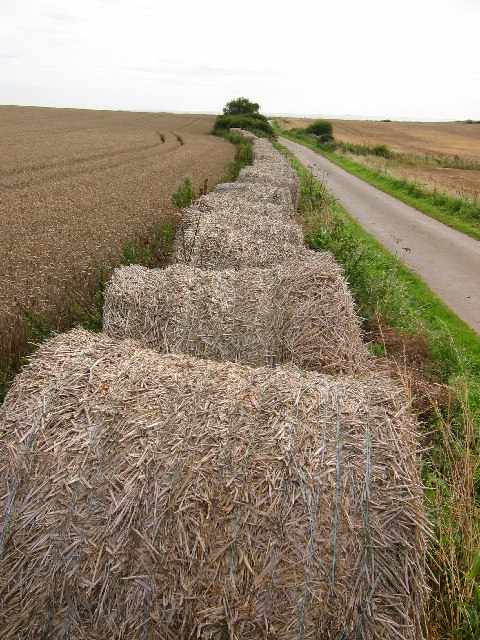
- The promise proposed was agricultural land. The consideration for it was indirect, but the promise was clear and damages were nonetheless awarded.
- Court: House of Lords
- Decided: 1658
- Citation: (1658) 2 Sid 115. (Gray's Inn Library Manuscript H-1792).

Court membership
- Judge sitting: Sid

Keywords
- Privity, third parties, consideration, action of assumpsit

Sprat v Agar is an early and landmark precedent and decision in third-party contract law, that is defeating privity of contract. It was one of a number of early cases in the development of how the writ of assumpsit came to allow third parties with no direct involvement to a contract could achieve standing to enforce benefits from a contract.

== Facts ==
John Agar had promised certain lands to Henry Sprat, as consideration for the dowry of the daughter of a third man Sir Thomas Lockier. The land was, however, only payable on the owner's death and the promise was made to Lockier, not Sprat, the intended recipient. It is not known why Agar would have made such an undertaking, but it is possible that Sprat was a rival suitor for the hand of Miss Lockier. Sir Thomas pre-deceased Agar and when he died, Agar left the lands to his wife.

The plaintiff Sprat appealed the will and was awarded £1300.

Recently it has been argued that in this case the third party was enjoined (directly involved) by his positive actions towards the daughter, creating a type of consideration which gave him legal standing (locus standi).
