= Shanklin Pier Ltd v Detel Products Ltd =

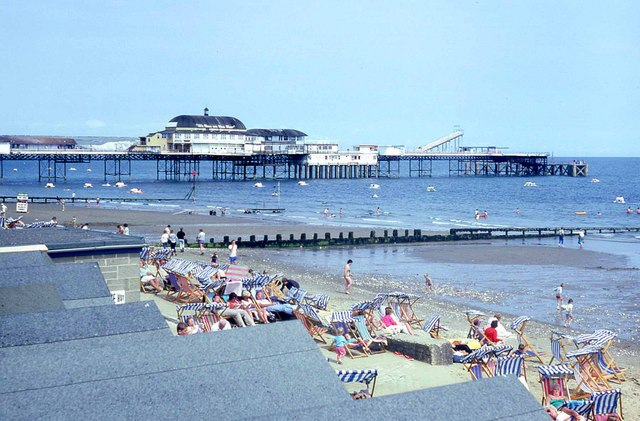
- Court: High Court of Justice King's Bench Division
- Citation: [1951] 2 KB 854

Court membership
- Judge sitting: McNair J

Keywords
- collateral contracts, consideration, privity of contract

Shanklin Pier Ltd v Detel Products Ltd [1951] 2 KB 854 is a leading judgment on the subject of collateral contracts in English contract law. In it the High Court of Justice King's Bench Division used the principle of collateral contracts, to create an exception to the rule of privity of contract where a contract may be given consideration by entering into another contract.

== Facts ==
Shanklin Pier Ltd hired a contractor to paint Shanklin Pier. They spoke to Detel Products Ltd about whether a particular paint was suitable to be used, and Detel assured them that it was, and that it would last for at least seven years. On the basis of this conversation Shanklin Pier Ltd instructed the contractors to use a particular paint, which they did. The paint started to peel after three months, and Shanklin Pier attempted to claim compensation from Detel Products.

== Judgment ==
McNair J's judgment read:

This case raises an interesting and comparatively novel question whether or not an enforceable warranty can arise as between parties other than parties to the main contract or the sale of the article in respect of which the warranty is alleged to have been given. ... I am satisfied that, if a direct contract of purchase and sale of [the paint] had then been made between the plaintiffs and the defendants, the correct conclusion on the facts would have been that the defendants gave to the plaintiffs the warranties substantially in the form alleged in the statement of claim. In reaching this conclusion, I adopt the principles stated by Holt CJ in Crosse v Gardner and Medina v Staughton that an affirmation at the time of sale is a warranty provided it appear on evidence to have been so intended. If, as is elementary, the consideration for the warranty in the usual case is the entering into of the main contract in relation to which the warranty is given, I see no reason why there may not be an enforceable warranty between A and B supported by the consideration that B should cause C to enter into a contract with A or that B should do some other act for the benefit of A.

== See also ==
- Privity in English law
