= Shanklin Pier =

Former pleasure pier on the Isle of Wight

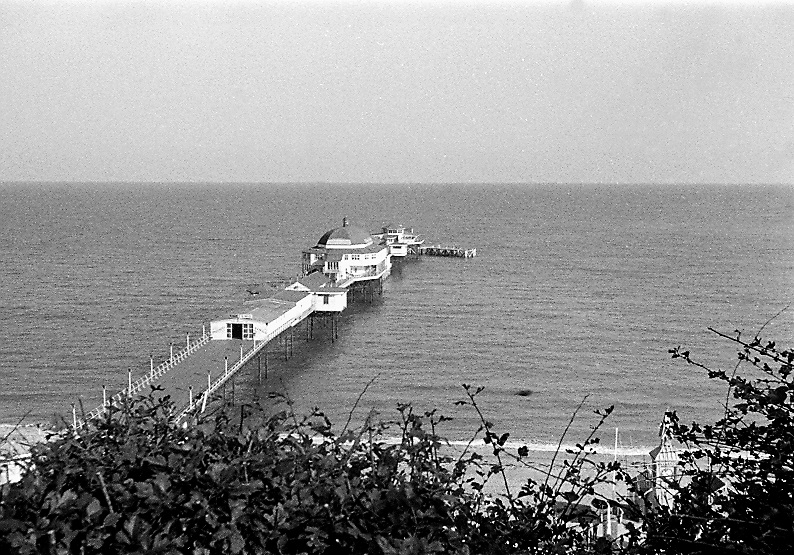
- Shanklin Pier on 9 September 1964
- Type: Pleasure
- Carries: Pedestrians
- Location: Shanklin
- Coordinates: 50.629309°N 1.172259°W

Characteristics
- Total length: 1,200 feet (370 m)

History
- Opening date: 18 August 1890; 136 years ago
- Closure date: October 1987; 38 years ago
- Demolition date: February 1993; 33 years ago

Shanklin Pier was a pleasure pier in the town of Shanklin on the Isle of Wight, England. Opened in August 1890 at a length of 1,200 feet (370 m), the pier saw several attractions added during its first few years, such as a bandstand and bathing stage. A pavilion was added in 1901.

As part of the war effort in 1940, the pier was sectioned to prevent an enemy invasion and later restored using concrete piles. During the Great storm of 1987, the pier suffered significant damage and was ultimately demolished in 1993 at an estimated cost of £250,000 (equivalent to £527,500 in 2024).

== History ==
=== Planning ===
The earliest known proposal for a pier was in 1864 when a Board of Trade order for a 1,200 feet (370 m) pier was received by the Shanklin Bay Pier Company, although they swiftly folded without any business being undertaken. In 1877, the Shanklin Pier Company also made an attempt in planning to build a pier with also did not materialise. On 22 December 1885, the Shanklin Esplanade Pier Company, with a £12,000 (equivalent to £1,668,000 in 2024) share capital, were successful in getting plans in motion and the site of the proposed pier was leased to them on 11 November 1885 for a £5 (equivalent to £700 in 2024) annual rent.

The Shanklin Pier Order 1886 authorising construction was passed in the Pier and Harbour Orders Confirmation Act 1886 (50 Vict. c. ix) on 25 September 1886, and plans for a traditionally designed pier were drawn by Messrs F. C. Dixon and M. N. Ridley. The pier was to be 1,200 feet (370 m) long and constructed with iron piles and wooden decking, complete with shelters on the deck and kiosks at the entrance. A pierhead measuring 90 feet (27 m) by 60 feet (18 m) would be complemented by a 150 feet (46 m)-long wooden landing stage. Work commenced in August 1888 by contractors John Dixon and Alfred Thorne.

=== Operation ===
The pier opened on 18 August 1890 at its planned length of 1,200 feet (370 m). Within its first few years, several additions were included, such as a bathing stage in 1893, lavatories the following year and in 1897, a bandstand that could accommodate 500 people with sheltered seating. The pier, which cost £18,000 (equivalent to £2,502,000 in 2024) to build, was put up for auction at the start of 1897, in which it was described as being of "handsome and substantial construction and elevation". Despite creating the most excitement among a curious public, the pier was withdrawn from auction at £7,500 (equivalent to £1,042,500 in 2024) when the highest bid was just under £7,000 (equivalent to £973,000 in 2024).

== Early 20th century ==
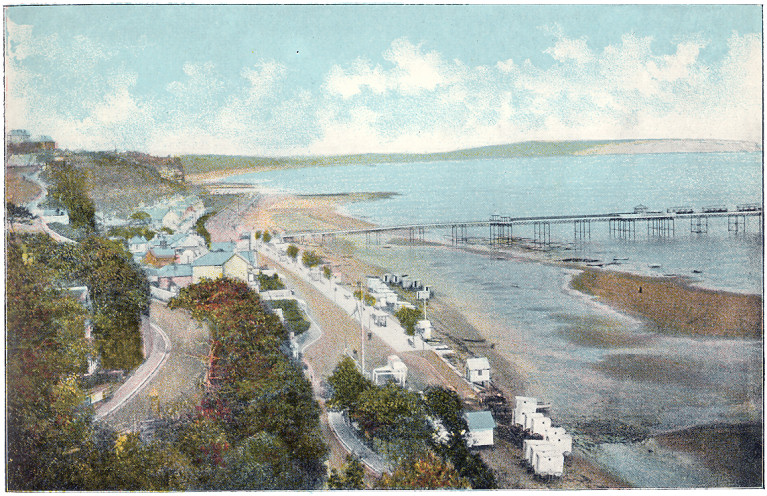
The pier and esplanade, c1910

On 28 July 1901, a £9,000 (equivalent to £1,251,000 in 2024) pavilion, built by Alfred Thorne, was opened and fitted with a maple floor to allow roller skating during the off-season winter period. The pavilion proved to be a financial success, particularly with concerts, generating an income of nearly £561 (equivalent to £78,000 in 2024) in its first year with expenses of £353 (equivalent to £49,100 in 2024). Roller skating was also profitable but its popularity had eased by 1911. The landing stage suffered significant storm damage in 1915 and was mostly dismantled as a result. On 29 June 1918, a fire caused significant damage to the pavilion, which left the pier in a state of disrepair as the pier company claimed they had insufficient funds to undertake repairs.

The pier was acquired by H. Terry Wood in 1925, who rebuilt the pavilion in the same design and named it the Casino, opening on 4 June 1927 using the girders which remained from the former pavilion. The cinema had a 1000-seat capacity and was popular with concert parties. Among its early visitors was Russian prima ballerina Anna Pavlova. The landing stage was rebuilt and opened in May 1931 and continued to see frequent use throughout the 1930s for pleasure cruises. The pier was at its peak during the 1930s, when it competed with Butlins on how many attractions it offered visitors. A dancing pavilion was added in 1933.

Upon the outbreak of World War II, the pier closed and the decking was sectioned to prevent it being used as a point of entry for an enemy invasion. Following the war, the damaged decking was replaced and supported using concrete piling, which looked out of place in contrast to the rest of the pier. In the 1950s, the pier owners contracted painters to paint the pier with Detel Products paints, following assurances from Detal that their paint was suitable for piers and would last up to 10 years. The pier owners sued Detel after the paint was proven to be unsuitable after just 3 months.

== Later years ==
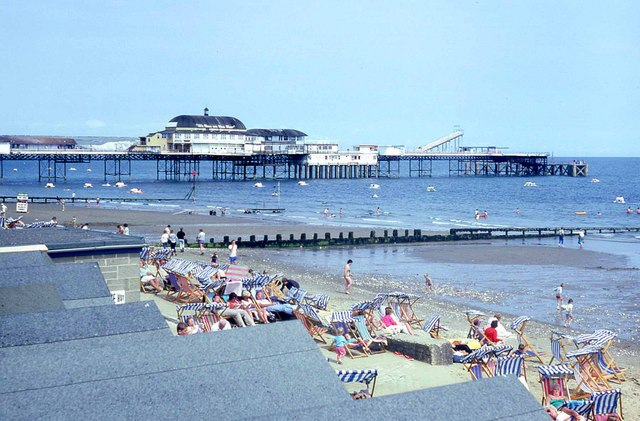
The pier in July 1986, 15 months before the storm of October 1987

The pier was briefly closed during 1975 but reopened in 1976 under ownership of Fred Sage. The Shanklin Pier Preservation Society was established to help raise funds to undertake repairs. In October 1987, the pier was destroyed by a hurricane-force storm, with winds so strong that the coastguard said their instruments were unable to measure it. Before the storm in 1986, Leading Leisure had purchased the pier with plans on developing it into a leisure complex. After the storm, the company went bankrupt, leaving the remains of pier in a state of disrepair.

South Wight Borough Council purchased the pier in late 1992 for around £25,000 (equivalent to £52,800 in 2024) and proceeded to pay £250,000 (equivalent to £527,500 in 2024) for it to be demolished, as costs to upgrade the structure were estimated at £1.5m plus maintenance. Materials from the pier would subsequently be recycled, including its concrete in new road construction.
