= Privity in English law =

Legal doctrine holding contracts unenforceable by non-parties

Privity is a doctrine in English contract law that covers the relationship between parties to a contract and other parties or agents. At its most basic level, the rule is that a contract can neither give rights to, nor impose obligations on, anyone who is not a party to the original agreement, i.e. a "third party". Historically, third parties could enforce the terms of a contract, as evidenced in Provender v Wood, but the law changed in a series of cases in the 19th and early 20th centuries, the most well known of which are Tweddle v Atkinson in 1861 and Dunlop Pneumatic Tyre v Selfridge and Co Ltd in 1915.

The doctrine was widely seen as unfair, for various reasons – it made no exception for cases where the parties to a contract obviously intended for it to be enforced by a third party, and it was so inconsistently applied that it provided no solid rule and was therefore "bad" law. The doctrine attracted criticism from figures such as Lord Scarman, Lord Denning, Lord Reid and Arthur Linton Corbin, and as early as 1937 the Law Revision Committee recommended that it should be significantly altered. With the passing of the Contracts (Rights of Third Parties) Act 1999 on 11 November 1999 the doctrine was significantly altered, and it now allows a third party to enforce the terms of a contract if the third party is specifically authorised to do so by the contract or if the contractual terms "purport to confer a benefit" on such third party.

== Original doctrine ==
The original doctrine of privity consisted of two rules: first, that a third party may not have obligations imposed by the terms of a contract, and second, that a third party may not benefit from the terms of a contract. The first rule is not something that is contested, while the second was described as "one of the most universally disliked and criticised blots on the legal landscape". The second rule was not originally held to be valid, and in the 17th century third parties were allowed to enforce terms of a contract that benefited them, as shown in Provender v Wood [1627] Hetley 30, where the judgment stated that "the party to whom the benefit of a promise accrews, may bring his action". The first reversal of this was in Bourne v Mason (1669) 1 Vent., where the Court of King's Bench found that a third party had no rights to enforce a contract that benefited him. This case was quickly reversed, and decisions immediately after Bourne v Mason took the view that third parties could enforce contracts that benefited them.

Over the next 200 years, judicial decisions differed as to whether or not a third party could enforce a contract that benefited them. The issue was settled in 1861 by Tweddle v Atkinson (1861) 121 ER 762, that confirmed that a third party could not enforce a contract that benefited him. This decision was affirmed by the House of Lords in Dunlop Pneumatic Tyre v Selfridge and Co Ltd [1915] AC 847 in 1915, where Lord Haldane stated that only a person who was party to a contract could sue on it. This version of the doctrine is commonly known as the original or basic doctrine.

=== Views of the original doctrine ===
Supporters of the original doctrine of privity say that it is reasonable not to allow third parties to enforce contracts, arguing that to allow them to do so would hamper the rights of the original parties in relation to amending or terminating contracts. Another argument put forward is that the doctrine was deliberately retained by judges to protect consumers from exclusion clauses designed to protect third party manufacturers from liability. The general view of academics, however, is that no legal argument has yet been advanced as to why the original doctrine should be good law. Patrick Atiyah argues that the doctrine came from a time of rising trade through middlemen, and was designed to simplify commercial transactions and encourage enterprise liability.

The second rule of privity, that a third party cannot claim benefits from a contract, was widely criticised by academics, members of the judiciary and legal professionals. One problem was that the rule made no exceptions for cases where it was obviously intended for the third party to claim a benefit, such as in Beswick v Beswick, where an uncle gave his nephew a business, on the condition that the nephew would pay the uncle a certain amount per week, and in the event of the uncle's death, give a similar amount to his widow.

A second argument used to undermine the doctrine of privity is the large number of exceptions to the rule created by acts of Parliament, which seemed to indicate that Parliament itself had an issue with the doctrine. Critics also argued that with the large number of inconsistencies and exceptions with the doctrine of privity, it was "bad" law, as it provided no reliable rule; the way that the law works in theory is hugely different from the way it was enforced by the courts. The doctrine is also not found in many other legal systems, such as that of the United States.

The doctrine came under criticism from many academics and judges, including Lord Scarman, Lord Denning, Lord Reid and Arthur Linton Corbin. As early as 1937 the Law Revision Committee recommended that the doctrine be completely abolished by an act of Parliament. Lord Diplock called the doctrine "an anachronistic shortcoming that has for many years been regarded as a reproach to English private law", and Stephen Guest wrote that "[I]t is said that it serves only to defeat the legitimate expectations of the third party, that it undermines the social interest of the community in the security of bargains and it is commercially inconvenient".

=== Loopholes ===
With the unpopularity of the doctrine, the judiciary developed several ways around it. These were at times both complex and extremely artificial, and used the law relating to trusts and agencies, along with other areas and ideas such as collateral contracts. These exceptions, however, were extremely limited in how they could be used.

==== Trusts ====
Trusts have been used as a way around the original doctrine of privity. A trust is an arrangement where the owner of property gives it to a second party (a trustee) to manage on behalf of a third party (a beneficiary). In this situation the House of Lords decided (in Les Affréteurs v Walford [1919] AC 801) that the trustee's ability to sue the owner of the property is to be exercised on behalf of the beneficiary, a third party. This is known as a "trust of the promise", and, while artificial, it bypassed the doctrine of privity. The trust exception has been heavily undermined by the decision in Re Schebsman [1944] Ch 83, which requires a court to find evidence of an intent to create a trust of the promise rather than simply using the requirement as an intention as a fiction to allow the courts to enact the trust exception.

==== Estates ====
In Beswick v Beswick an uncle gifted his nephew a business, on the condition that the nephew would pay the uncle (Mr Beswick) a certain amount per week, and in the event of the uncle's death, give a similar amount to his widow (Mrs Beswick). When the uncle died the nephew refused to pay the widow the money required, arguing that as she was not party to the original agreement she could not benefit from it. The Court of Appeal under Lord Denning tried to use this as an opportunity to claim that the doctrine of privity was invalid, something the House of Lords rejected. However, the Lords did agree that Mrs Beswick could sue, not as a third party to the contract but as the executrix of her husband's estate. As executrix she would be acting as a representative of Mr Beswick, and the doctrine of privity would not apply.

==== Claiming on behalf of another ====
A second exception was created in Jackson v Horizon Holidays Ltd [1975] 1 WLR 1468. Jackson had booked a family holiday in his own name from Horizon Holidays. The holiday did not match the specifications given in the contract, and Jackson sued Horizon Holidays. The company accepted liability, but claimed that they should not have to pay damages to the family as the doctrine of privity meant they were not allowed to sue on the contract. The Court of Appeal said that the loss of enjoyment suffered by the family was a loss to Jackson himself. He had paid for a family holiday but not received it, and so damages were awarded.

This created fairly limited circumstances in which a party could sue on behalf of another, if the other party would have benefited from the contract.

==== Collateral contracts ====
A collateral contract is a contract where the consideration is the entry into another subordinate contract, which co-exists side by side with the main contract. Because this normally involves parties who are not part of the main contract, it has been used as a way around the doctrine of privity. The habit of the courts finding collateral contracts to allow an injured third party to sue has been criticised, however, as "exceedingly artificial", and in light of the Contracts (Rights of Third Parties) Act 1999 the use of this has been predicted to decrease.

In Shanklin Pier Ltd v Detel Products Ltd [1951] 2 KB 854, Shanklin Pier Ltd were having their pier refurbished. Shanklin Pier contacted a painting company and asked them to repaint the pier with paint produced by Detel Products, based on assurances from Detel that the paint would last for at least seven years. The painters bought the paint from Detel and used it to repaint the pier. Within three months the paint had almost completely flaked off. Shanklin Pier had no contractual relationship with Detel Products, but the Court of Appeal found like there was a collateral contract they could use to sue.

As a loophole the use of collateral contracts is limited, because the courts must first find evidence to imply some kind of collateral contract, as well as consideration. Attempts by the courts to do this have added to the perception of this as an artificial device; the decision in Charnock v Liverpool Corporation [1968] 1 WLR 1498, which used collateral contracts, has been described by Guenter Treitel as "invented" consideration, and by Patrick Atiyah as "fictitious". In certain commercial contracts, such as goods sold to consumers by a dealer, there is automatically a collateral contract between the consumer and the manufacturer of the goods.

==== Insurance contracts ====
Parliament is not bound by the common law, and as a result several acts of Parliament unwittingly create valid exceptions to the doctrine of privity. Under the Road Traffic Act 1988, motorists are obliged to take out third party liability insurance. This means that victims of car accidents can claim money from the insurer of the driver at fault, even though they are not part of the original contract. Under the Married Women's Property Act 1882 a husband can take out insurance in his own name, but make it enforceable by his wife and children despite the doctrine of privity.

=== Exceptions ===
There are several ways around the original doctrine which were not loopholes created by case law but situations which by their very nature must involve three parties. Broadly speaking these are agency, assignment, and negotiable instruments.

==== Agency ====
An agency relationship is between three parties: a principal authorises an agent to make a contract on his behalf with a third party. In agency situations an agent can make a contract with a third party that is binding on the principal, even though he was not privy to the original contract. The right of an agent to make this sort of agreement is found in statute, such as the Consumer Credit Act 1974 which allows a dealer for a financial company to set up credit agreements as a representative of that company.

It can be argued that this is not a true exception to the doctrine because once the contract is made the "agent" plays no further part, leaving it as an agreement between two parties. Certain elements of the doctrine of agency have been said to clash with privity, however. In some circumstances the principal can sue the third party even when the agent has not disclosed to the third party that he is acting as an agent to the principal. In this situation, the third party can be sued by somebody that he had no idea was involved in the contract.

==== Assignment ====
Assignment is an area of both English contract law and the law of real estate that governs the transfer of rights from one party to another. This can include the right to enforce a debt. In this situation the party who is assigned the debt can sue the debtor despite any contractual agreement between them. Again, this is permitted by statute, specifically the Law of Property Act 1925.

==== Negotiable instruments ====
A negotiable instrument is a type of contract that allows the transfer of money, such as a cheque. With a cheque there are three parties: the person holding the bank account who gives the cheque (the drawer), the party the cheque is made out to (the payee), and the drawer's bank which promises to pay the money to the payee (the drawee).

== Contracts (Rights of Third Parties) Act 1999 ==
The doctrine of privity was significantly reformed by the Contracts (Rights of Third Parties) Act 1999, which received royal assent on 11 November 1999 and "thereby [removed] one of the most universally disliked and criticised blots on the legal landscape". The first proposal to reform the doctrine of privity was made in 1937 by the Law Revision Committee in its Sixth Interim Report, which proposed an act of Parliament to allow third parties to enforce terms of a contract that specifically allowed them to do so. The report was not acted on; as late as 1986 the assumption was that Parliament would not act, and any reform would come from judicial sources (particularly the House of Lords).

In 1991 the Law Commission published Consultation Paper No. 121 "Privity of Contract: Contracts for the Benefit of Third Parties", which proposed a similar change, and in 1996 the final report (No. 242), along with a draft Bill, were published. The proposed changes were supported by the legal profession and academics alike, and the Bill was finally introduced to parliament in January 1999. It came into law on 11 November 1999, but the full provisions of the Act did not come into force until May 2000. The act made it clear that contracts made in the six-month "twilight period" could be enforced by the act if they made it clear in the contract that it was made under the terms of the Act.

Section 1 of the Act allows a third party to enforce terms of a contract in one of two situations: firstly if he is specifically mentioned in the contract as someone authorised to do so, and secondly if the contract "purports to confer a benefit" on him. An exception to the second rule is if the contract makes it clear that the third party is not meant to be able to enforce the term. In Nisshin Shipping Co Ltd v Cleaves & Co Ltd [2003] EWHC 2602 the High Court decided that in situations where there are questions over whether or not the second rule has been disapplied by a statement in the contract, the onus is on the party claiming that it has been disapplied. In the same decision the court decided that simply arranging an alternative way of enforcing the terms does not indicate that the 1999 Act was not meant to be used.

The third party can be identified by name or as a member of a particular group, and does not need to exist when the contract was made. The Act specifically excludes certain types of contract, such as contracts for the transport of goods across national lines, as these fall under international trade laws.

The second situation, that a third party can enforce terms that "purport to confer a benefit on him", has been described as too broad, and one view put forward in the parliamentary debates was that it was "un-workable" in situations such as complex construction contracts involving dozens of sub-contractors with chains of contracts between them. This argument, and a proposal to exempt the construction industry from the Act, was rejected by both the Law Commission and Parliament.

Section 2 gives the third party various protections once they have chosen to enforce the act: the parties cannot alter or end the contract if the third party has told them that he wishes to enforce the contract or relied on the contract (and the promisor knows this or could be expected to have known this). If the contract is breached, the third party has all the rights that he would have if he had been a party to the initial contract.

The act had various consequences: as well as allowing third parties to enforce terms, it also made a number of exceptions to the basic rule unnecessary, such as claiming on behalf of another party as seen in Jackson v Horizon Holidays Ltd [1975] 1 WLR 1468. It does not repeal or abolish these exceptions, however, and this allows the courts to accept cases based on the old common law exceptions as well as the 1999 Act. The Act specifically allows parties to exempt the provisions of the Act from contracts, allowing them a way out if they so choose.

== Privity and consideration ==
A general consensus is that privity is distinct from consideration. As well as Haldane's judgment in Dunlop, the courts have stated a similar principle in other cases such as Scruttons Ltd v Midland Silicones Ltd [1962] AC 446 and Beswick v Beswick – that privity is separate from consideration. Supporters of this view concede that while privity and consideration are distinct doctrines, there is a strong relationship between the two. This causes problems with the idea that the doctrine of privity should be abolished, as the idea that third parties can claim benefits from promises that they gave nothing for clashes with the doctrine of consideration, which prevents parties who did not contribute something to the agreement from benefiting from it.

It has been argued, however, that privity is not even a distinct doctrine, but rather simply part of consideration. Consideration is a rule that there must be a "benefit or detriment" involved in any contract, and that this must initially come from the promisee. It is argued that this rule and the doctrine of privity are two ways of saying the same thing – that to say someone is not a party to the contract is the same as saying that they gave no consideration in the initial agreement. This attitude is found in decisions by the Judiciary of England and Wales – in Tweddle v Atkinson, Crompton and Blackburn JJ made the decision that they did because the claimant had not provided consideration, and the majority in Dunlop Pneumatic Tyre Co Ltd v Selfridge & Co Ltd based their judgment on a similar point. It is worth noting, however, that Lord Haldane maintained in his judgement in Dunlop that, independent of consideration, it was a rule in English law that "only a person who is party to a contract can sue on it".

== See also ==
- English contract law
- Smith and Snipes Hall Farm Ltd v River Douglas Catchment Board
- New Zealand Shipping Co Ltd v A M Satterthwaite & Co Ltd
- Linden Gardens Trust Ltd v Lenesta Sludge Disposals [1994] 1 AC 85
- Henderson v Merrett Syndicates Ltd
- White v Jones
- Williams v Natural Life Health Foods Ltd

== Bibliography ==
- Atiyah, Patrick (1979). The Rise and Fall of Freedom of Contract. Clarendon Press. ISBN 0-19-825527-6.
- Dean, Meryll (2000). "Removing a blot on the landscape - the reform of the doctrine of privity". Journal of Business Law (21–9460). Sweet & Maxwell.
- Elliott, Catherine; Frances Quinn (2007). Contract Law (6th ed.). Pearson Education. ISBN 978-1-4058-4671-4.
- Flannigan, Robert (October 1987). "Privity - the end of an era (error)". Law Quarterly Review (103). Sweet & Maxwell. ISSN 0023-933X.
- Jacobs, Edward (1986). "Judicial reform of privity and consideration". Journal of Business Law. Sweet & Maxwell. ISSN 0021-9460.
- Johnson, Howard (1992). "Privity: an anachronistic shortcoming!". International Banking and Financial Law. 10 (10). Sweet & Maxwell. ISSN 0263-8185.
- McKendrick, Ewan (2007). Contract Law (7th ed.). Palgrave Macmillan. ISBN 978-0-230-01883-9.
- Mulcahy, Linda (2008). Contract Law In Perspective (5th ed.). Routledge. ISBN 978-0-415-44432-3.
- Treitel, Guenter (1983). An Outline of the Law of Contract (6th ed.). Oxford University Press. ISBN 0-406-97268-0.
- Treitel, Guenter (2003). Law of Contract (11th ed.). Sweet & Maxwell. ISBN 0-421-78850-X.
- Turner, Chris (2007). Unlocking Contract Law (2nd ed.). Hodder Arnold. ISBN 978-0-340-94196-6.
- Whincup, Michael (2006). Contract law and practice: the English system with Scottish, Commonwealth, and Continental comparisons. Kluwer Law International. ISBN 978-90-411-2521-7.
