= Linden Gardens Trust Ltd v Lenesta Sludge Disposals Ltd =

Linden Gardens Ltd v Lenesta Sludge Ltd and St Martin's Property Corporation Ltd v Sir Robert McAlpine Ltd (conjoined appeals)
- Court: House of Lords
- Citations: [1994] 1 AC 85 [1993] 3 WLR 408 [1993] 3 All ER 417 [1994] UKHL 4

Court membership
- Judges sitting: Lord Keith; Lord Bridge; Lord Griffiths; Lord Ackner; Lord Browne-Wilkinson

Keywords
- Duty of care, privity, assignment

Linden Gardens Trust Ltd v Lenesta Sludge Disposals Ltd [1993] UKHL 4, [1994] 1 AC 85 is the short title for a judicial decision of conjoined appeals to the Judicial Committee of the House of Lords in relation to the relevance of continued privity of contract following assignment of property under English contract law.

The decision involved two legal cases, Linden Gardens Trust Limited v Lenesta Sludge Disposals Limited and others, and St. Martin's Property Corporation Limited and others v Sir Robert McAlpine and Sons Limited. Both cases concerned substantially defective works and decisions on whether the assignee who was directly impacted could recover money for this directly (the Linden appeal) and/or the assignor (the original owner) could recover the money by suing the works contractor (the St Martin's appeal). The contract clause used could, the Court held, legitimately on grounds of public policy somewhat prohibit assignment (that is be subject to its qualified consent to assign the underlying asset, the property). The two potential lines of liability were decided in the negative and in the affirmative respectively. In summary, the first case was not brought by the original owner who commissioned the works (the new owner of the building should have considered the old asbestos contractor in his purchase transaction), the second case was brought by the original owner, still in business, at the behest of the new owner and in a case where both the original parties knew that the development would very likely be assigned and relied on by third parties.

== Facts ==
Stock Conversions Ltd, the original lessee of a building, used a Joint Contracts Tribunal (JCT) standard form contract to hire Lenesta to remove asbestos. Clause 17(1) stated that:

The employer shall not without written consent of the contractor assign this contract.

Lenesta subcontracted another firm to do the job. More asbestos was soon found, and a third business was contracted. Then Stock Conversions Ltd assigned the building lease to Linden Gardens, and at the same time, without Lenesta ever having consented, assigned its right of action (against Lenesta) to Linden Gardens. More asbestos was found and Linden Gardens sued the contractors for negligence and breach of contract. The Court of Appeal found that the assignment was effective. Lenesta appealed.

In a second joined case, St Martin's Property Corp Ltd ("St Martin's") had been granted a 150-year lease on a site where they commissioned a shop development. In 1974, using the JCT standard contract with clause 17, as in the other conjoined appeal, they hired Sir Robert McAlpine as a builder. St Martin's assigned their property interest and the benefits of the contracts to a new owner after the works were completed, without the contractor's consent. Then in 1981 it was found that the building work was defective, and remedial work would cost £800,000. The Court of Appeal by a majority held the assignment was incorrect but that St Martin's was entitled to damages.

== Judgment ==
The House of Lords held that a true construction of clause 17(1) prohibited assignment without consent and that since a party to such a contract might have a genuine commercial interest in ensuring that contractual relations with the party he selected were preserved, there was no reason for holding the contractual prohibition on assignment as being contrary to public policy.

In the second case because the development was, to the knowledge of the parties, very likely to be occupied or purchased by third parties, any defective works damage would accrue to a subsequent owner rather than the original developer. Because of the specific contractual provision that rights of action were not assignable without the defendants' consent, the parties could properly be treated as having entered into the contract on the basis that the first claimants would be entitled to enforce against the defendant's contractual duties on behalf of all those third parties who would suffer from defective performance of the contract but were unable to acquire rights under it, subject to causation, limitation periods and quantum. Accordingly, the first plaintiffs were entitled to substantial damages for any breaches of the contract by the defendants.

Lord Browne-Wilkinson adapted the concept of Lord Diplock in The Albazero that there is an exception applicable to contracts of carriage: "that the consignor may recover substantial damages against the shipowner if there is privity of contract between him and the carrier for the carriage of goods; although, if the goods are not his property or at his risk, he will be accountable to the true owner for the proceeds of his judgment."

== Application ==
The Court of Appeal applied the decisions in Darlington Borough Council v Wiltshier Northern Limited in 1994 because the circumstances in this case, which also involved defective construction work, fell "within the rationale" of the Linden and St. Martin's rulings. In this case, Darlington Council had arranged for a special purpose company, Morgan Grenfell (Local Authority Services) Ltd., to finance and contract for the development of a sport centre, and the three parties, Darlington, Wiltshier and the special purpose company, had entered into a tripartite agreement. The Court noted that the construction work took place on council-owned land and was obviously undertaken for the benefit of the Council, with the special purpose company having no long-term interest in the building. The rights had been properly assigned to the Council and Wiltshier's liability for the defective works was therefore upheld.

== See also ==
- English contract law
