= The Prior's Case =

Property law case

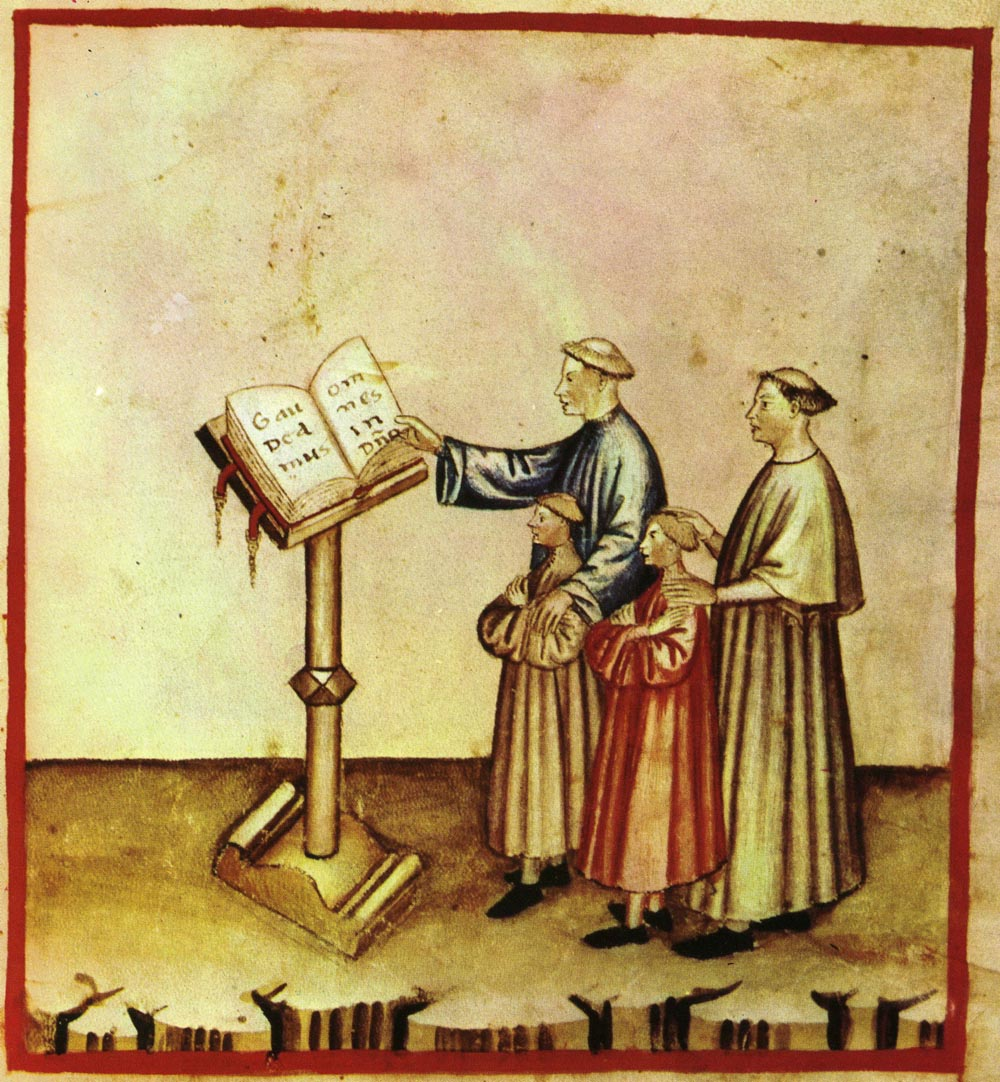
- Citations: (1368) Co Litt 385a, (1368) YB 42 Edw 3 fo 3 pl 14

Keywords
- Covenant

The Prior's Case (1368) Co Litt 385a is an English property law case that decided the benefit of a covenant can run with the land as it is passed between parties.

== Facts ==
A prior, a tenant in fee simple, covenanted with the Lord of the manor that he and his convent would sing for mass each week in the manor chapel. The plaintiff was the covenantee's successor, a tenant in tail. He sued to enforce the covenant.

== Judgment ==
The Court held that the Lord of the manor’s successors in title could sue the prior for non-performance of his agreement.

A covenant made with the owner of land is for the benefit of the land. It followed that the covenant can be enforced against the covenantor whether or no he owned any estate in the land, and also against successors in title.

== See also ==
- Smith and Snipes Hall Farm Ltd v River Douglas Catchment Board [1949] 2 KB 500
