= Tomlinson v Gill =

- Citation: (1756) Ambler 330

Case opinions
- Lord Hardwicke

Keywords
- Privity

Tomlinson v Gill (1756) Ambler 330 is an English contract law case concerning privity of contract. It stands as an example of the flexible approach to privity under the earlier common law.

== Judgment ==
Lord Hardwicke decided that a third person is entitled to sue if there can be spelt out of the contract an intention by one of the parties to contract as trustee for him, even though nothing was said about any trust in the contract, and there was no trust fund to be administered.

== See also ==
- English contract law
