= Spencer's Case =

English real property law case about leasehold covenants

- Court: Court of King's Bench
- Full case name: Spencer v. Clark
- Decided: 1583
- Citation: [1583] EWHCKB J53, 77 ER 72, (1583) 5 Co Rep. 16a

Court membership
- Judges sitting: Christopher Wray J Thomas Gawdy J

Keywords
- Leasehold; Land Covenants

Spencer's Case (1583) 5 Co Rep. 16a, is an English common law case reported by Sir Edward Coke, who was then sitting on the King's Bench. It establishes the rule that covenants in leases with a sufficiently close relation to the land "run with the land," and will bind assignees of the leasehold.

== Facts ==
Spencer and his wife granted a lease over real property to "S" for 21 years. The lease contained a covenant that S, his executors, administrators, or assigns would build a brick wall on the property. S assigned the lease to "J", who assigned the lease to the defendant Clark. The wall was not built and Spencer sued Clark as the assignee of the leasehold.

== Judgment ==
In 1583 the Court of King's Bench gave judgment in favor of Spencer. The central question was what kinds of covenants will bind an assignee who is not expressly named in the instrument creating the legal estate.

The court started with the proposition that a covenant over a thing in existence at the time of the demise attaches to the thing and will bind assignees, but a covenant over a thing to be created later only binds executors and administrators and not assignees. In this case, the court found, the thing (i.e., the wall) did not exist when the covenant was created.

However, the court held Spencer should nevertheless get the benefit of the covenant. Even though the wall did not exist at the time, its construction was to be done on the land and the assignee would get the benefit of the wall. The opinion went on to examine other situations where a covenant benefiting property held other than in fee simple would run with the land and thus compel an assignee to act.

== Influence ==
Spencer's Case is an early departure from strict rules of contractual privity that limit recourse for breach of covenant when brought against third parties who did not sign the contract containing the covenant. It established at common law that covenants with a close relationship to the land will "run with the land."

Coke's opinion is the source of the phrase "touch and concern the land," paraphrasing his observation that "if the thing to be done be merely collateral to the land, and doth not touch or concern the thing demised in any sort, there the assignee shall not be charged". Touch-and-concern is still a principal tool for distinguishing between covenants which must be honored by the assignee of a legal estate, and those which are collateral and thus subject to rules of privity. While the Law of Property Act 1925 at ss 141 and 142 now uses the phrase "have reference to the subject matter of the lease" it has the same meaning.

It is also the source of a phrase, used later in court opinions and other writings, about the centrality of judicial interpretation in the development of the common law:

Observe reader your old books, for they are the fountains out of which these resolutions issue, but perhaps by these differences the fountains themselves will be made more clear and profitable to those who will make use of them.
