= Field v Fitton =

1988 New Zealand privity of contract case

- Court: Court of Appeal of New Zealand
- Full case name: C R Field (appellants) v D A Fitton (First Respondents) & B Paulin (Second Respondent)
- Decided: 22 March 1988
- Transcript: Court of Appeal judgment High Court judgment

Court membership
- Judges sitting: McMullin P, Gallen J, Bisson J

Keywords
- privity of contract

Field v Fitton [1988] 1 NZLR 482 is a cited New Zealand case regarding privity of contract.

== Background ==
The Fields were trustees of an estate that had a property for sale. In 1987, they entered into a sale agreement with Brent Paulin, with the buyer being referred to in the sales agreement "Brent Paulin or nominee". It was done this way as Mr Paulin thought he could onsell this property to a third party for a profit before the settlement date. Within two days, Fitton came along and bought Paulin's right to purchase for $15,000.

However, when Fitton's solicitor informed the trustees that he was now the nominee for the purchase, they refused to deal with him directly, as they were worried that by dealing with a nominee, rather than Paulin, they might be liable for two separate amounts of stamp duty. The trustees continued to deal with Paulin directly, however as Paulin had sold his interest, he ignored their requests to continue with the sale process, resulting in no settlement on settlement day. As a result, the vendors cancelled the sale.

Mr Fitton, not happy with this development, sued the trustees, challenging the cancellation, claiming that under sections 4 and 8 of the Contracts (Privity) Act, he had all the legal rights to the sales agreement that Paulin had.

== Verdict ==
Section 4 required a nominee to be "designated by name, description or reference to a class", and here this requirement was not met, as "or nominee" was not specific enough, as all that was nominated was a "bare nominee".

Bisson J stated "It is difficult to treat a bare nominee, not designated by name, as a person identified by description or as being within a designated class of persons. The nominee could be anyone at all. In the context of S.4 'designated' means specified or identified, so that if the nominee is not named, the word 'nominee' in the contract should be qualified by the addition of a descriptive phrase or the addition of the particular class within which the nominee falls, so as to specify or identify the nominee in the manner required by s 4"

This meant that the Contracts (Privity) Act did not apply here. But the legal argument was moot, as due to the fact that neither Paulin nor Fitton settled the sale on the date of settlement, the trustees were able to cancel the sale contract anyway.
