= Nisshin Shipping Co Ltd v Cleaves & Co Ltd =

Nisshin v Cleaves
- Court: High Court of Justice of England & Wales, Queen's Bench Division (Commercial Court)
- Full case name: Nisshin Shipping Co Ltd v Cleaves & Co Ltd
- Decided: 7 November 2003
- Citation: [2003] EWHC 2602 (Comm)
- Transcript: Full text of judgment

Court membership
- Judge sitting: The Honourable Mr Justice Colman

Keywords
- Privity, CRTPA 1999

Nisshin Shipping Co Ltd v Cleaves & Co Ltd [2003] EWHC 2602 is an English contract law case concerning the Contracts (Rights of Third Parties) Act 1999.

== Facts ==
Cleaves & Co Limited was a firm of chartering brokers. It negotiated charterparties between shipowner Nisshin Shipping Co Limited and various charterers. Although Cleaves was not a party to any of these, in each one Nisshin expressly agreed to pay a commission to Cleaves and to arbitrate their disputes. Nisshin declined to pay the commissions.

Cleaves commenced arbitration against Nisshin seeking to recover the unpaid commissions. The arbitral tribunal decided that it had jurisdiction to decide the dispute because, first, under s. 1 of the Contracts (Rights of Third Parties) Act 1999 (“CRTPA”), Cleaves have a right to enforce the provisions in the charterparties under which Nisshin agreed to pay Cleaves commission (the “substantive term”); and, second, under s. 8 of that Act, Cleaves had a right to enforce the substantive term through commencing arbitration under the arbitration agreement in each charterparty.

Nisshin applied to the High Court under s. 67 of the Arbitration Act 1996 to challenge both grounds of the tribunal's decision, seeking a declaration that the arbitral tribunal would have no jurisdiction to hear the claims.

== Judgment ==
=== Whether Cleaves had a right to enforce the substantive term ===
The Court held that the issues under this question were: (i) whether the clauses in the charterparties providing for commissions “purported to confer a benefit” on Cleaves within s. (1)(b) CRTPA; and (ii) whether s. 1(b) was disapplied by s. 1(2) because “on a proper construction of the contact it appears that the parties did not intend the term to be enforceable by the third party”.

==== Whether the clauses purported to confer a benefit on Cleaves ====
Each of the relevant clauses provided:

A commission of 2 per cent for equal division is payable by the vessel and owners to Messrs Ifchor SA Lausanne and Messrs Cleaves and Company Ltd, London on hire earned and paid under this Charter, and also upon any continuation or extension of this charter

Nisshin argued that these clauses meant the payment should be made to Messrs Ifchor and then subsequently divided by that firm between itself and Cleaves and, accordingly, that the benefit was not conferred by the clause directly on Cleaves. The Court disagreed, finding that its meaning was in substance exactly the same as if the clause had provided that there was to be a commission of 2 per cent of which 1 per cent was to be paid to Messrs Ifchor and 1 per cent to Cleaves.

==== Whether on a proper construction the parties did not intend that Cleaves should be able to the enforce the substantive term ====
Nisshin argued that on a proper construction of the charterparties the parties had not intended that Cleaves would be able to enforce the substantive term because: (i) the arbitration clauses in all of the charterparties did not make express provision for enforcement by a broker of a claim for commission; (ii) there is no positive indication in the charterparties that the parties did intend the brokers to have enforceable rights; and (iii) the parties’ mutual intention on the proper construction of each contract was to create a trust of a promise in favour of Cleaves – a trust enforceable against Nisshin at the suit of the charterer as trustee.

As to (i), the Court decided that the wording of the arbitration clauses was of little or no materiality: (a) even if the parties only intended to arbitrate disputes between the parties, that was entirely consistent with a mutual intention that Cleaves should be obliged to enforce the substantive term through the courts; (b) if, on the proper construction of CRTPA (as the Court went on later to find in relation to the second main issue in the case) the third party is obliged to enforce the commission benefit by arbitration even where the agreement does not on its proper construction provide for any participants in an arbitration other than the parties to the main contract, then the strength of any inference derived from the absence of express provision that the third party may arbitrate could be little more than negligible.

As to (ii), the Court decided that s. 1(2) only disapplies s. 1(b) if on a proper construction of the contract the parties did not intend the third party to be able to enforce the substantive term. Accordingly, s. 1(2) had no effect where it appears the parties did intend that the third party should be able to enforce the substantive term nor where the contract is neutral as to whether they did. The Court found that the clauses in issue were neutral as to the parties’ intention and therefore that s. 1(2) did not disapply s. 1(b) in this case.

Finally, as to (iii), the Court decided that Nisshin's argument could only succeed if it could be inferred from the existence of the underlying trustee relationship (by which the charterer was trustee for Cleaves of Nisshin's promise to pay the commission) that it was the mutual intention of Owners and Charterers that the broker beneficiary should not be entitled to avail himself of the facility of direct action by CRTPA. The Court found that inference “entirely unsustainable”: it did not follow from the underlying trustee relationship that the parties had intended that Cleaves would not have been able to benefit from the (relatively) new statutory right under CRTPA instead of using the “cumbrous fiction” of the earlier trust-based route.

Accordingly, the Court decided that Cleaves was entitled to enforce the substantive term against Nisshin.

=== Whether Cleaves had a right to arbitrate the dispute ===
The Court's reasoning on this issue is considered difficult to understand and has been criticised by commentators.

In essence, the Court appears to have been persuaded by Cleaves’ argument based on an analogy drawn in the Explanatory Notes to CRTPA. (Note: Notes published by the Government to accompany the Act of Parliament, and in this case similar to those published to accompany the Bill) These Explanatory Notes suggested of s. 8 that:

Subsection (1) deals with what is likely to be the most common situation. The third party's substantive right (for example, to payment by the promisor) is conferred subject to disputes being referred to arbitration (see section 1(4)). This section is based on a “conditional benefit” approach. It ensures that a third party who wishes to take action to enforce his substantive right is not only able to enforce effectively his right to arbitrate, but is also “bound” to enforce his right by arbitration (so that, for example, a stay of proceedings can be ordered against him under section 9 of the Arbitration Act 1996). This approach is analogous to that applied to assignees who may be prevented from unconscionably taking a substantive benefit free of its procedural burden (see, for example, DVA v. Voest Alpine, The Jaybola [1997] 2 Lloyd’s Rep 279).

The Court decided that:

39. The introduction into these [Explanatory] Notes of the assignment analogy directs attention to the concept that under the contract the promisee could not enforce the substantive term unless he had resort to arbitration if the scope of the agreement to arbitrate were wide enough to cover the dispute about such enforcement. Once the latter condition is satisfied an assignee from the promisee stands in the shoes of the promisee as regards enforcement of that term.

…

40. The promise under these charterparties to pay commission to the brokers was clearly a promise made to and enforceable by the charterers. Failure to perform that obligation would clearly fall within the scope of all the arbitration clauses. If the charterers had assigned their cause of action for failure to pay commission to the brokers by a statutory assignment the latter could only have enforced that promise if they resorted to arbitration against the owners. Had they done so, it would not have been open to the owners to challenge the arbitrators’ jurisdiction on the grounds that the only parties to the arbitration agreement who were identified by it were the owners and the charterers. That would be because such identification would be completely irrelevant to the entitlement of the brokers to utilize the arbitration agreement. The transference by assignment of the substantive chose in action necessarily involved the transference of the procedural means of enforcement of it.

The Court thus decided that Cleaves was bound (and thus entitled) to enforce the substantive term through the indicated process of arbitration. It found that the parties’ expressions of mutual intent were “irrelevant” in this regard.

The Court's decision on this issue is perhaps best treated with caution. It has been commented that the interpretation given to CRTPA by the Court appear to be wrong as a matter of interpretation and fails to afford sufficient prominence to the parties’ autonomy to contract. Furthermore, it has been noted that if CRTPA is ambiguous in this respect, then the decision was taken in apparent ignorance of statements in Hansard, admissible under the rule in Pepper v Hart, which seem clearly to show that Parliament intended that it should be a matter for ordinary construction of the contract whether or not a third party should be entitled to enforce an arbitration agreement.

== See also ==
- English contract law
