= Beswick v Beswick =

English contract law case

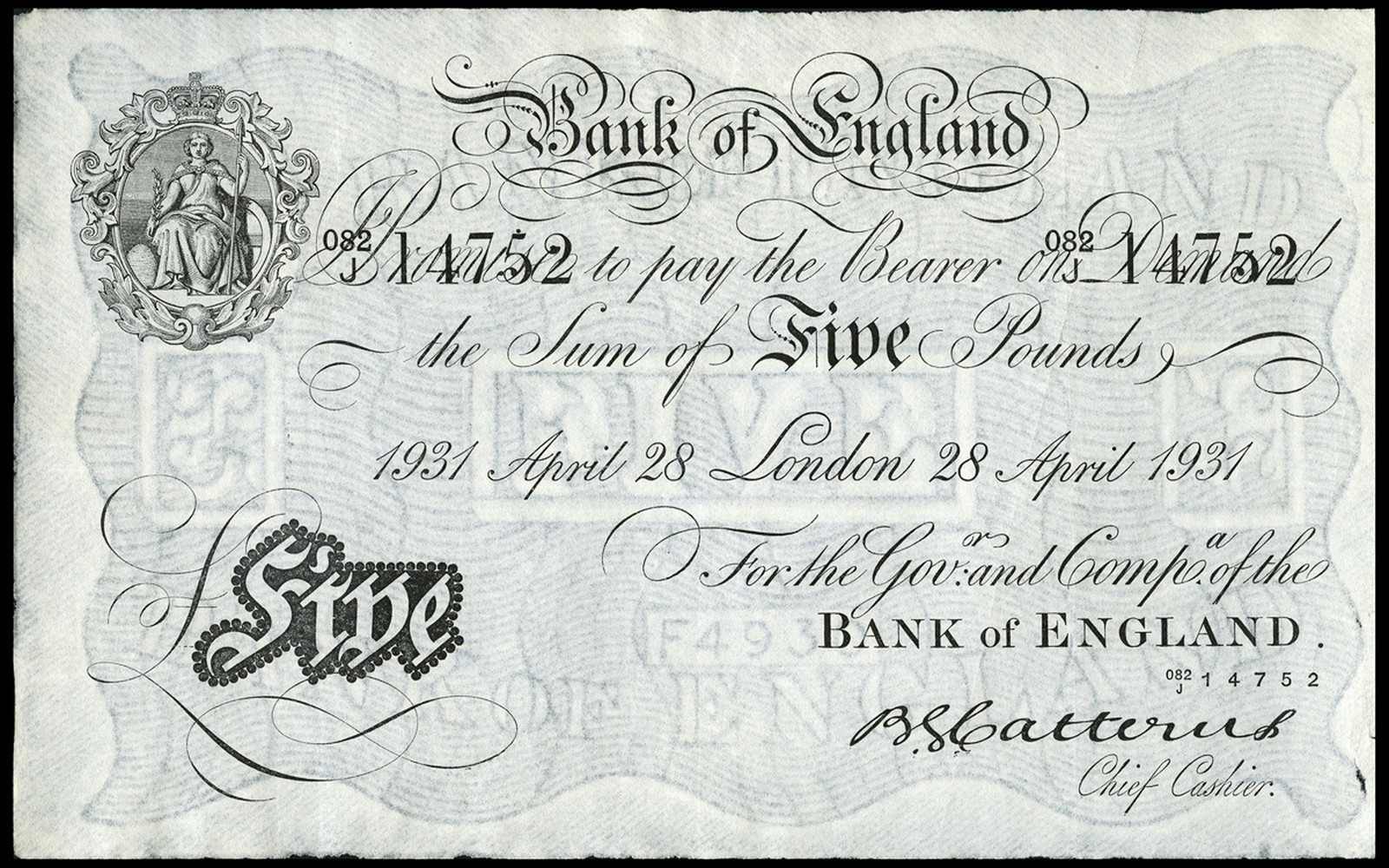
- The case concerned a widow who should have received a weekly annuity of five pounds from her nephew.
- Court: House of Lords
- Decided: 29 June 1967
- Citation: [1968] AC 58, [1967] UKHL 2
- Transcript: Full text of judgment

Case history
- Prior action: [1966] Ch 538, [1966] 3 WLR 396, [1966] 3 All ER 1

Court membership
- Judges sitting: Lord Reid; Lord Pearce; Lord Upjohn; Lord Guest; Lord Hodson

Case opinions
- Lord Reid, Lord Pearce, Lord Upjohn and Lord Guest

Keywords
- Privity, third parties, consideration, specific performance

Beswick v Beswick [1967] UKHL 2, [1968] AC 58 was a landmark English contract law case on privity of contract and specific performance. The House of Lords, overruling the decision of Lord Denning in the Court of Appeal, ruled that a person who was not party to a contract had no independent standing to sue to enforce it, even if the contract were clearly intended for his benefit.

Today the judicial precedent has been codified by statute in the United Kingdom, and Lord Denning's decision has largely been given effect by the Contracts (Rights of Third Parties) Act 1999. However the case remains good law in many other Commonwealth common law jurisdictions.

== Facts ==
Lord Denning in the Court of Appeal started describing the facts of the case in the following way.

Old Peter Beswick was a coal merchant in Eccles, Lancashire. He had no business premises. All he had was a lorry, scales, and weights. He used to take the lorry to the yard of the National Coal Board, where he bagged coal and took it round to his customers in the neighbourhood. His nephew, John Joseph Beswick, helped him in his business. In March 1962, old Peter Beswick and his wife were both over 70. He had his leg amputated and was not in good health. The nephew was anxious to get hold of the business before the old man died. So they went to a solicitor, Mr. Ashcroft, who drew up an agreement for them.

The agreement was that Peter assign his business to his nephew in consideration of the nephew employing him for the rest of his life and then paying a weekly annuity to Mrs Beswick. Since the latter term was for the benefit of someone not party to the contract, the nephew did not believe it was enforceable and so did not perform it, making only one payment of the agreed weekly amount of £5.

The nephew argued that as Mrs Beswick was not a party to the contract, she could not enforce it due to the doctrine of privity of contract.

== Decision ==
=== Court of Appeal ===
Lord Denning held that Mrs Beswick was entitled to claim in her capacity as a third party intended to benefit from the contract. He said,

Where a contract is made for the benefit of a third person who has a legitimate interest to enforce it, it can be enforced by the third person in the name of the contracting party or jointly with him or, if he refuses to join, by adding him as a defendant. In that sense and it is a very real sense, the third person has a right arising by way of contract.

Danckwerts LJ and Salmon LJ concurred in the result, though not with Lord Denning's reasoning.

=== House of Lords ===
The House of Lords disagreed with Lord Denning in the Court of Appeal, that the law allowed third parties to sue to enforce benefits under a contract. However, they held that Mrs Beswick in her capacity as Mr Beswick's administratrix (i.e. as the representative of the estate of an intestate person) could enforce the nephew's promise to pay Mrs Beswick an annuity. Furthermore, Mrs Beswick was entitled to specific performance of the contract.

Lord Reid's judgment outlined the details, with which Lords Hodson, Pearce, Upjohn and Guest concurred.

For clarity I think it best to begin by considering a simple case where, in consideration of a sale by A to B, B agrees to pay the price of £1,000 to a third party X. Then the first question appears to me to be whether the parties intended that X should receive the money simply as A's nominee so that he would hold the money for behoof of A and be accountable to him for it, or whether the parties intended that X should receive the money for his own behoof and be entitled to keep it. That appears to me to be a question of construction of the agreement read in light of all the circumstances which were known to the parties. There have been several decisions involving this question. I am not sure that any conflicts with the view which I have expressed: but if any does, for example, In re Engelbach's Estate, I would not agree with it. I think that In re Schebsman was rightly decided and that the reasoning of Uthwatt J. and the Court of Appeal supports what I have just said. In the present case I think it clear that the parties to the agreement intended that the respondent should receive the weekly sums of £5 in her own behoof and should not be accountable to her deceased husband's estate for them. Indeed the contrary was not argued.

Reverting to my simple example the next question appears to me to be: Where the intention was that X should keep the £1,000 as his own, what is the nature of B's obligation and who is entitled to enforce it? It was not argued that the law of England regards B's obligation as a nullity, and I have not observed in any of the authorities any suggestion that it would be a nullity. There may have been a time when the existence of a right depended on whether there was any means of enforcing it, but today the law would be sadly deficient if one found that, although there is a right, the law provides no means for enforcing it. So this obligation of B must be enforceable either by X or by A. I shall leave aside for the moment the question whether section 56 (1) of the Law of Property Act 1925, has any application to such a case, and consider the position at common law.

Lord Denning's view, expressed in this case not for the first time, is that X could enforce this obligation. But the view more commonly held in recent times has been that such a contract confers no right on X and that X could not sue for the £1,000. Leading counsel for the respondent based his case on other grounds, and as I agree that the respondent succeeds on other grounds, this would not be an appropriate case in which to solve this question. It is true that a strong Law Revision Committee recommended so long ago as 1937 (Cmd. 5449):

"That where a contract by its express terms purports to confer a benefit directly on a third party it shall be enforceable by the third party in his own name ..." (p. 31).

And, if one had to contemplate a further long period of Parliamentary procrastination, this House might find it necessary to deal with this matter. But if legislation is probable at any early date I would not deal with it in a case where that is not essential. So for the purposes of this case I shall proceed on the footing that the commonly accepted view is right.

What then is A's position? I assume that A has not made himself a trustee for X, because it was not argued in this appeal that any trust had been created. So, if X has no right, A can at any time grant a discharge to B or make some new contract with B. If there were a trust the position would be different. X would have an equitable right and A would be entitled and, indeed, bound to recover the money and account for it to X. and A would have no right to grant a discharge to B. If there is no trust and A wishes to enforce the obligation, how does he set about it? He cannot sue B for the £1,000 because under the contract the money is not payable to him, and, if the contract were performed according to its terms, he would never have any right to get the money. So he must seek to make B pay X.

The argument for the appellant is that A's only remedy is to sue B for damages for B's breach of contract in failing to pay the £1,000 to X. Then the appellant says that A can only recover nominal damages of 40s. because the fact that X has not received the money will generally cause no loss to A: he admits that there may be cases where A would suffer damage if X did not receive the money but says that the present is not such a case.

Applying what I have said to the circumstances of the present case, the respondent in her personal capacity has no right to sue, but she has a right as administratrix of her husband's estate to require the appellant to perform his obligation under the agreement. He has refused to do so and he maintains that the respondent's only right is to sue him for damages for breach of his contract. If that were so, I shall assume that he is right in maintaining that the administratrix could then only recover nominal damages because his breach of contract has caused no loss to the estate of her deceased husband.

If that were the only remedy available the result would be grossly unjust. It would mean that the appellant keeps the business which he bought and for which he has only paid a small part of the price which he agreed to pay. He would avoid paying the rest of the price, the annuity to the respondent, by paying a mere 40s. damages.

The respondent's first answer is that the common law has been radically altered by section 56 (1) of the Law of Property Act 1925, and that that section entitles her to sue in her personal capacity and recover the benefit provided for her in the agreement although she was not a party to it. Extensive alterations of the law were made at that time but it is necessary to examine with some care the way in which this was done. That Act was a consolidation Act and it is the invariable practice of Parliament to require from those who have prepared a consolidation Bill an assurance that it will make no substantial change in the law and to have that checked by a committee. On this assurance the Bill is then passed into law, no amendment being permissible. So, in order to pave the way for the consolidation Act of 1925, earlier Acts were passed in 1922 and 1924 in which were enacted all the substantial amendments which now appear in the Act of 1925 and these amendments were then incorporated in the Bill which became the Act of 1925. Those earlier Acts contain nothing corresponding to section 56 and it is therefore quite certain that those responsible for the preparation of this legislation must have believed and intended that section 56 would make no substantial change in the earlier law, and equally certain that Parliament passed section 56 in reliance on an assurance that it did make no substantial change.

In construing any Act of Parliament we are seeking the intention of Parliament and it is quite true that we must deduce that intention from the words of the Act. If the words of the Act are only capable of one meaning we must give them that meaning no matter how they got there. But if they are capable of having more than one meaning we are, in my view, well entitled to see how they got there. For purely practical reasons we do not permit debates in either House to be cited: it would add greatly to the time and expense involved in preparing cases involving the construction of a statute if counsel were expected to read all the debates in Hansard, and it would often be impracticable for counsel to get access to at least the older reports of debates in Select Committees of the House of Commons, moreover, in a very large proportion of cases such a search, even if practicable, would throw no light on the question before the court. But I can see no objection to investigating in the present case the antecedents of section 56.

Section 56 was obviously intended to replace section 5 of the Real Property Act 1845 (8 and 9 Vict. c. 106). That section provided:

"That, under an indenture, executed after October 1, 1845, an immediate estate or interest, in any tenements or hereditaments, and the benefit of a condition or covenant, respecting any tenements or hereditaments, may be taken, although the taker thereof be not named a party to the same indenture. ..."

Section 56 (1) now provides:

"A person may take an immediate or other interest in land or other property, or the benefit of any condition, right of entry covenant or agreement over or respecting land or other property, although he may not be named as a party to the conveyance or other instrument: ..."

If the matter stopped there it would not be difficult to hold that section 56 does not substantially extend or alter the provisions of section 5 of the Act of 1845. But more difficulty is introduced by the definition section of the Act of 1925 (section 205 ) which provides:

"(1) In this Act unless the context otherwise requires, the following expressions have the meanings hereby assigned to them respectively, that is to say:- ... (xx) 'Property' includes any thing in action, and any interest in real or personal property."

Before further considering the meaning of section 56 (1) I must set out briefly the views which have been expressed about it in earlier cases. White v. Bijou Mansions Ltd. dealt with a covenant relating to land. The interpretation of section 56 was not the main issue. Simonds J. rejected an argument that section 56 enabled anyone to take advantage of a covenant if he could show that if the covenant were enforced it would redound to his advantage. He said:

"Just as under section 5 of the Act of 1845 only that person could call it in aid who, although not a party, yet was a grantee or covenantee, so under section 56 of this Act only that person can call it in aid who, although not named as a party to the conveyance or other instrument, is yet a person to whom that conveyance or other instrument purports to grant something or with which some agreement or covenant is purported to be made."

He was not concerned to consider whether or in what way the section could be applied to personal property. In the Court of Appeal Sir Wilfrid Greene M.R. said, in rejecting the same argument as Simonds J. had rejected:

"Before he can enforce it he must be a person who falls within the scope and benefit of the covenant according to the true construction of the document in question."

Again he was not considering an ordinary contract and I do not think that he can be held to have meant that every person who falls within the "scope and benefit" of any contract is entitled to sue, though not a party to the contract.

In In re Miller's Agreement two partners covenanted with a retiring partner that on his death they would pay certain annuities to his daughters. The Revenue's claim for estate duty was rejected. The decision was clearly right. The daughters, not being parties to the agreement, had no right to sue for their annuities. Whether they received them or not depended on whether the other partners were willing to pay or, if they did not pay, whether the deceased partner's executor was willing to enforce the contract. After citing the earlier cases Wynn-Parry J. said:

"I think it emerges from these cases that the section has not the effect of creating rights, but only of assisting the protection of rights shown to exist."

I am bound to say I do not quite understand that. I had thought from what Lord Simonds said in White's case that section 5 of the Act of 1845 did enable certain persons to take benefits which they could not have taken without it. If so, it must have given them rights which they did not have without it. And, if that is so, section 56 must now have the same effect. In Smith and Snipes Hall Farm Ltd v River Douglas Catchment Board Denning L.J., after stating his view that a third person can sue on a contract to which he is not a party, referred to section 56 as a clear statutory recognition of this principle, with the consequence that Miller's case was wrongly decided. I cannot agree with that. and in Drive Yourself Hire Co. (London) Ltd. v. Strutt Denning L.J. again expressed similar views about section 56.

I can now return to consider the meaning and scope of section 56. It refers to any "agreement over or respecting land or other property." If "land or other property" means the same thing as "tenements or hereditaments" in the Act of 1845 then this section simply continues the law as it was before the Act of 1925 was passed, for I do not think that the other differences in phraseology can be regarded as making any substantial change. So any obscurities in section 56 are obscurities which originated in 1845. But if its scope is wider, then two points must be considered. The section refers to agreements "over or respecting land or other property." The land is something which existed before and independently of the agreement and the same must apply to the other property. So an agreement between A and B that A will use certain personal property for the benefit of X would be within the scope of the section, but an agreement that if A performs certain services for B, B will pay a sum to X would not be within the scope of the section. Such a capricious distinction would alone throw doubt on this interpretation.

Perhaps more important is the fact that the section does not say that a person may take the benefit of an agreement although he was not a party to it: it says that he may do so although he was not named as a party in the instrument which embodied the agreement. It is true that section 56 says " although he may not be named "; but section 5 of the Act of 1845 says although he "be not named a party." Such a change of phraseology in a consolidation Act cannot involve a change of meaning. I do not profess to have a full understanding of the old English law regarding deeds. But it appears from what Lord Simonds said in White's case and from what Vaisey J. said in Chelsea and Walham Green Building Society v. Armstrong that being in fact a party to an agreement might not be enough; the person claiming a benefit had to be named a party in the indenture. I have read the explanation of the old law given by my noble and learned friend, Lord Upjohn. I would not venture to criticise it, but I do not think it necessary for me to consider it if it leads to the conclusion that section 56 taken by itself would not assist the present respondent.

But it may be that additional difficulties would arise from the application to section 56 of the definition of property in the definition section. If so, it becomes necessary to consider whether that definition can be applied to section 56. By express provision in the definition section a definition contained in it is not to be applied to the word defined if in the particular case the context otherwise requires. If application of that definition would result in giving to section 56 a meaning going beyond that of the old section, then, in my opinion, the context does require that the definition of "property" shall not be applied to that word in section 56. The context in which this section occurs is a consolidation Act. If the definition is not applied the section is a proper one to appear in such an Act because it can properly be regarded as not substantially altering the pre-existing law. But if the definition is applied the result is to make section 56 go far beyond the pre-existing law. Holding that the section has such an effect would involve holding that the invariable practice of Parliament has been departed from per incuriam so that something has got into this consolidation Act which neither the draftsman nor Parliament can have intended to be there. I am reinforced in this view by two facts. The language of section 56 is not at all what one would have expected if the intention had been to bring in all that the application of the definition would bring in. And, secondly, section 56 is one of 25 sections which appear in the Act under the cross-heading "Conveyances and other Instruments." The other twenty-four sections come appropriately under that heading and so does section 56 if it has a limited meaning: but, if its scope is extended by the definition of property, it would be quite inappropriately placed in this part of the Act. For these reasons I am of opinion that section 56 has no application to the present case.

The respondent's second argument is that she is entitled in her capacity of administratrix of her deceased husband's estate to enforce the provision of the agreement for the benefit of herself in her personal capacity, and that a proper way of enforcing that provision is to order specific performance. That would produce a just result, and, unless there is some technical objection, I am of opinion that specific performance ought to be ordered. For the reasons given by your Lordships I would reject the arguments submitted for the appellant that specific performance is not a possible remedy in this case. I am therefore of opinion that the Court of Appeal reached a correct decision and that this appeal should be dismissed.

== Significance ==
In Smith and Snipes Hall Farm Ltd v River Douglas Catchment Board [1949] 2 KB 500, 514, Denning LJ had already tried to dispose of the English doctrine of privity. He had said,

A man who makes a deliberate promise which is intended to be binding, that is to say, under seal, or for good consideration, must keep his promise; and the court will hold him to it, not only at the suit of the party who gave the consideration but also at the suit of one who was not a party to the contract, provided that it was made for his benefit and that he has a sufficient interest to entitle him to enforce it, subject always, of course, to any defences that may be open on the merits.

In Australia, Coulls v. Bagot's Executor and Trustee Co Ltd (1967) 119 CLR 460 shows the approach has been similar. Here the contract was between a husband (Mr Coulls) and a company (Bagot's). Mrs Coulls was not a party to it. Even if she was, she could not enforce it, as she gave no consideration. Bagots was entitled to the benefit of this contract as executor of Mr Coull's Estate.

Many people, including judges had called for statutory reform and in England this came in the form of the Contracts (Rights of Third Parties) Act 1999, which gives a general right to enforce the benefit of a contract when one was either expressly identified as capable of enforcing it, or one was intended to benefit.

== See also ==
- English contract law
- Contracts (Rights of Third Parties) Act 1999
- Tweddle v Atkinson (1861) 1 B&S 393, the traditional rule of privity
- Dunlop Pneumatic Tyre Co Ltd v Selfridge & Co Ltd [1915] AC 847, affirming the privity rule 50 years later in a resale price maintenance case.
