= Privity of contract =

Legal principle

The doctrine of privity of contract is a common law principle which provides that a contract cannot confer rights or impose obligations upon anyone who is not a party to that contract. It is related to, but distinct from, the doctrine of consideration, according to which a promise is legally enforceable only if valid consideration has been provided for it, and a plaintiff is legally entitled to enforce such a promise only if they are a promisee from whom the consideration has moved.

A principal consequence of the doctrine of privity is that, at common law, a third party generally has no right to enforce a contract to which they are not a party, even where that contract was entered into by the contracting parties specifically for their benefit and with a common intention among all of them that they should be able to enforce it. In England & Wales and Northern Ireland, the doctrine has been substantially weakened by the Contracts (Rights of Third Parties) Act 1999, which created a statutory exception to privity, providing, in certain circumstances, third parties the right to enforce terms of contracts to which they are not privy.

== Third party rights ==
Privity of contract occurs only between the parties to the contract, most commonly contract of sale of goods or services. Horizontal privity arises when the benefits from a contract are to be given to a third party. Vertical privity involves a contract between two parties, with an independent contract between one of the parties and another individual or corporation.

If a third party gets a benefit under a contract, it does not have the right to go against the parties to the contract beyond its entitlement to a benefit. An example of this occurs when a manufacturer sells a product to a distributor and the distributor sells the product to a retailer. The retailer then sells the product to a consumer. There is no privity of contract between the manufacturer and the consumer.

This, however, does not mean that the parties do not have another form of action: for instance, in Donoghue v. Stevenson – a friend of Ms. Donoghue bought her a bottle of ginger beer, which contained the partially decomposed remains of a snail. Since the contract was between her friend and the shop owner, Mrs. Donoghue could not sue under the contract, but it was established that the manufacturer was in breach of a duty of care owed to her. Accordingly, she was awarded damages in the tort of negligence for having suffered gastroenteritis and "nervous shock".

== History ==
Prior to 1861 there existed decisions in English Law allowing provisions of a contract to be enforced by persons not party to it, usually relatives of a promisee, and decisions disallowing third party rights. The doctrine of privity emerged alongside the doctrine of consideration, the rules of which state that consideration must move from the promise, that is to say that if nothing is given for the promise of something to be given in return, that promise is not legally binding unless promised as a deed. 1833 saw the case of Price v. Easton, where a contract was made for work to be done in exchange for payment to a third party. When the third party attempted to sue for the payment, he was held to be not privy to the contract, and so his claim failed. This was fully linked to the doctrine of consideration, and established as such, with the more famous case of Tweddle v. Atkinson. In this case the plaintiff was unable to sue the executor of his father-in-law, who had promised to the plaintiff's father to make payment to the plaintiff, because he had not provided any consideration to the contract.

The doctrine was developed further in Dunlop Pneumatic Tyre v. Selfridge and Co. Ltd. through the judgment of Lord Haldane.

Privity of Contract played a key role in the development of negligence as well. In the first case of Winterbottom v. Wright (1842), in which Winterbottom, a postal service wagon driver, was injured due to a faulty wheel, attempted to sue the manufacturer Wright for his injuries. The courts however decided that there was no privity of contract between manufacturer and consumer.

This issue appeared repeatedly until MacPherson v. Buick Motor Co. (1916), a case analogous to Winterbottom v Wright involving a car's defective wheel. Judge Cardozo, writing for the New York Court of Appeals, decided that no privity is required when the manufacturer knows the product is probably dangerous if defective, third parties (e.g. consumers) will be harmed because of said defect, and there was no further testing after initial sale. Foreseeable injuries occurred from foreseeable uses. Cardozo's innovation was to decide that the basis for the claim was that it was a tort not a breach of contract. In this way he finessed the problems caused by the doctrine of privity in a modern industrial society. Although his opinion was only law in New York State, the solution he advanced was widely accepted elsewhere and formed the basis of the doctrine of product liability.

== Exceptions ==
=== Common law exceptions ===
There are exceptions to the general rule, allowing rights to third parties and some impositions of obligations. These are:

- Collateral Contracts (between the third party and one of the contracting parties)
- Trusts (the beneficiary of a trust may sue the trustee to carry out the contract)
- Land Law (restrictive covenants on land are imposed upon subsequent purchasers if the covenant benefits neighbouring land)
- Agency and the assignment of contractual rights are permitted.
- Third-party insurance - A third party may claim under an insurance policy made for their benefit, even though that party did not pay the premiums.
- Contracts for the benefit of a group, where a contract to supply a service is made in one person's name but is intended to sue at common law if the contract is breached; there is no privity of contract between them and the supplier of the service.

Attempts have been made to evade the doctrine by implying trusts (with varying success), constructing the Law of Property Act 1925 s. 56(1) to read the words "other property" as including contractual rights, and applying the concept of restrictive covenants to property other than real property (without success).

1. in case of trust/beneficiary
2. in case of family arrangement
3. in case of acknowledgment of debts
4. in case of assignment of contract.

=== Statutory exceptions ===
In England and Wales, the Contracts (Rights of Third Parties) Act 1999 provided some reform for this area of law which has been criticised by judges such as Lord Denning and academics as unfair in places. The act states:

1. - (1) Subject to the provisions of this act, a person who is not a party to a contract (a "third party") may in his own right enforce a term of the contract if-

(a) the contract expressly provides that he may, or
(b) subject to subsection (2), the term purports to confer a benefit on him.

(2) Subsection (1)(b) does not apply if on a proper construction of the contract it appears that the parties did not intend the term to be enforceable by the third party.

This means that a person who is named in the contract as a person authorised to enforce the contract or a person receiving a benefit from the contract may enforce the contract unless it appears that the parties intended that he may not.

The Act enables the aim of the parties to be fully adhered to. In Beswick v Beswick, the agreement was that Peter Beswick assign his business to his nephew in consideration of the nephew employing him for the rest of his life and then paying a weekly annuity to Mrs. Beswick. Since the latter term was for the benefit of someone not party to the contract, the nephew did not believe it was enforceable and so did not perform it, making only one payment of the agreed weekly amount. Yet the only reason why Mr. Beswick contracted with his nephew was for the benefit of Mrs. Beswick. Under the Act, Mrs. Beswick would be able to enforce the performance of the contract in her own right. Therefore, the Act realises the intentions of the parties.

The law has been welcomed by many as a relief from the strictness of the doctrine, however it may still prove ineffective in professionally drafted documents, as the provisions of this statute may be expressly excluded by the draftsmen.

In Hong Kong, the Contracts (Rights of Third Parties) Ordinance provided for a similar legal effect as the Contracts (Rights of Third Parties) Act 1999.

=== Third-party beneficiaries ===
In Australia, it has been held that third-party beneficiaries may uphold a promise made for its benefit in a contract of insurance to which it is not a party (Trident General Insurance Co Ltd v. McNiece Bros Pty Ltd (1988) 165 CLR 107). The decision in Trident had no clear ratio, and did not create a general exemption to the doctrine of privity in Australia.

Queensland, the Northern Territory and Western Australia have all enacted statutory provisions to enable third party beneficiaries to enforce contracts, and limited the ability of contracting parties to vary the contract after the third party has relied on it. In addition, section 48 of the Insurance Contracts Act 1984 (Cth) allows third-party beneficiaries to enforce contracts of insurance.

Although damages are the usual remedy for the breach of a contract for the benefit of a third party, if damages are inadequate, specific performance may be granted (Beswick v. Beswick [1968] AC 59).

The issue of third-party beneficiaries has appeared in cases where a stevedore has claimed it is covered under the exclusion clauses in a bill of lading. In order for this to succeed, three factors must be made out:

- The bill of lading must clearly intend to benefit the third party.
- It is clear that when the carrier contracts with the consignor, it also contracts as an agent of the stevedore. That is, either the carrier must have had authority by the stevedore to act on its behalf, or the stevedore must later ratify (endorse) the actions of the carrier.
- Any difficulties with consideration moving from the stevedores must be made out.

The last issue was explored in New Zealand Shipping Co Ltd v. A M Satterthwaite & Co Ltd [1975] AC 154, where it was held that the stevedores had provided consideration for the benefit of the exclusion clause by the discharge of goods from the ship.

New Zealand has enacted the Contracts Privity Act 1982, which enables third parties to sue if they are sufficiently identified as beneficiaries by the contract, and in the contract it is expressed or implied they should be able to enforce this benefit. An example case of not being "sufficiently identified" is that of Field v Fitton (1988).

== See also ==
- Contract law
- Consumer protection
- Privity
  - Privity of estate
  - Privity in English law
- Tertius (law)
- Jus tertii
