= Contracts (Rights of Third Parties) Act 1999 =

Act of the Parliament of the United Kingdom

Contracts (Rights of Third Parties) Act 1999 (Note: Section 10(1).)
- Act of Parliament
- Parliament of the United Kingdom
- Long title: An Act to make provision for the enforcement of contractual terms by third parties.
- Citation: 1999 c. 31
- Introduced by: Lord Chancellor, Lord Irvine of Lairg (Lords)
- Territorial extent: England and Wales (except section 9); Northern Ireland; (Note: Section 10(4).)

Dates
- Royal assent: 11 November 1999
- Commencement: 11 November 1999 (Note: Section 10(2). The act did not apply in relation to a contract entered into before 11 May 2000, unless the contract expressly provided for the application of the act (section 10(3)).)
Other legislation
Amended by	Limited Liability Partnerships Regulations 2001; Limited Liability Partnerships Regulations (Northern Ireland) 2004; Railways (Convention on International Carriage by Rail) Regulations 2005; Companies Act 2006 (Consequential Amendments, Transitional Provisions and Savings) Order 2009; Crime and Courts Act 2013

Status: Amended

Text of statute as originally enacted

Revised text of statute as amended

The Contracts (Rights of Third Parties) Act 1999 (c. 31) is an act of the Parliament of the United Kingdom that significantly reformed the common law doctrine of privity and "thereby [removed] one of the most universally disliked and criticised blots on the legal landscape". The second rule of the doctrine of privity, that a third party could not enforce a contract for which he had not provided consideration, had been widely criticised by lawyers, academics and members of the judiciary. Proposals for reform via an act of Parliament were first made in 1937 by the Law Revision Committee in their Sixth Interim Report. No further action was taken by the government until the 1990s, when the Law Commission proposed a new draft bill in 1991, and presented their final report in 1996. The bill was introduced to the House of Lords in December 1998, and moved to the House of Commons on 14 June 1999. It received royal assent on 11 November 1999, coming into force immediately as the Contracts (Rights of Third Parties) Act 1999.

== Background ==
The historical doctrine of privity consisted of two rules. The first was that a third party may not have obligations imposed by the terms of a contract, and the second was that a third party may not enforce a contract for which he has not provided consideration. The first rule was not contested, while the second had been subject to criticism. Originally, the second rule was not held to be valid. In the 17th century, a third party was allowed to enforce terms of a contract that benefited him, as shown in Provender v Wood [1627] Hetley 30, where the judgement stated that "the party to whom the benefit of a promise accrews, may bring his action". The first reversal of this law came in Bourne v Mason [1669] 1 Vent., where the Court of King's Bench found that a third party had no rights to enforce a contract that benefited him. This ruling was quickly reversed, and decisions immediately after used the original rule.

Over the next 200 years, different judges provided different decisions as to whether or not a third party could enforce a contract that benefited them. The dispute ended in 1861 with Tweddle v Atkinson [1861] 121 ER 762, which confirmed that a third party could not enforce a contract that benefited him. This decision was affirmed by the House of Lords in Dunlop Pneumatic Tyre v Selfridge and Co Ltd [1915] AC 847 in 1915, where Lord Haldane stated that only a person who was party to a contract could sue on it. This version of the doctrine is commonly known as the original or basic doctrine.

=== Criticism of the original doctrine ===
The second rule of privity, that a third party cannot claim benefits from a contract, was widely criticised by academics, members of the judiciary and legal professionals. One problem was that the rule made no exceptions for cases where it was obviously intended for the third party to claim a benefit, such as the young couple in Tweddle v Atkinson, or the widow in Beswick v Beswick, where an uncle gave his nephew a business, on the condition that the nephew would pay the uncle a certain amount per week, and in the event of the uncle's death, give a lesser amount to his widow.

A second argument used to undermine the doctrine of privity was to point out the large number of exceptions to the rule created by acts of Parliament, which seemed to indicate that Parliament itself had an issue with the doctrine. Critics also argued that with the large number of inconsistencies and exceptions with the doctrine of privity, it was a "bad" law, as it provided no reliable rule; the way that the law works in theory is hugely different from how it is enforced in the courts. The doctrine is also not found in many other legal systems, such as that of the United States.

The doctrine came under criticism from many academics and judges, including Lord Scarman, Lord Denning, Lord Reid and Arthur Linton Corbin, and Stephen Guest wrote that "[I]t is said that it serves only to defeat the legitimate expectations of the third party, that it undermines the social interest of the community in the security of bargains and it is commercially inconvenient".

== Formation ==
The first legislative proposal to reform the doctrine of privity was made in 1937; the Law Revision Committee, in their Sixth Interim Report, proposed an act of Parliament that would allow third parties to enforce terms of a contract that specified that they were allowed. The Second World War intervened, and the report was not acted on; even as late as 1986 the assumption was that Parliament would not act, and any reform would come from judicial sources (in particular, the House of Lords).

In 1991, the Law Commission (the successor to the Law Revision Committee) published Consultation Paper No. 121 "Privity of Contract: Contracts for the Benefit of Third Parties", which proposed a similar change, and in July 1996, the final report (No. 242), along with a draft bill, were published. The proposed changes were supported by the legal profession and academics alike. The bill was introduced to the House of Lords on 3 December 1998, and during its second reading, was jokingly offered to Lord Denning as a birthday present due to his fight to overturn the doctrine of privity. It was moved to the House of Commons on 14 June, and it received royal assent on 11 November 1999.

== Provisions ==
=== Section 1: Right of third party to enforce contractual term ===
Section 1 of the act overrides the old common law rule that a third party could not enforce the terms of a contract, as established in Dunlop Pneumatic Tyre Co Ltd v Selfridge & Co Ltd, and also the rule that a third party was unable to act against the promisor, established in Tweddle v Atkinson. It allows a third party to enforce the terms of a contract in one of two situations: firstly if the third party is specifically mentioned in the contract as someone authorised to do so, and secondly if the contract "purports to confer a benefit" on him. (Note: The legislation uses the pronouns "he" and "him" in this section and elsewhere.)

An exception to the "purports to confer a benefit" basis for enforceability involves contracts that include language barring third parties from applying the rule. Another exception applies to contracts between solicitors and their clients to write wills, something governed by White v Jones [1995] 2 AC 207. After the act was first published, Guenter Treitel argued that in a situation where the promisor felt that the second rule had been wrongly applied by a statement in the contract, the onus would be on him to prove it. In Nisshin Shipping Co Ltd v Cleaves & Co Ltd [2003] EWHC 2602, the High Court supported Treitel's reasoning.

The second situation, that a third party can enforce terms that "purport to confer a benefit on him", has been described by Meryll Dean as too broad, and one view put forward in the parliamentary debates was that it was "un-workable" in situations such as complex construction contracts involving dozens of sub-contractors with chains of contracts among them. This argument, and a proposal to exempt the construction industry from the act, was rejected by both the Law Commission and Parliament. The phrase "purport to confer a benefit" was originally found in the 1937 Law Commission paper, and was used in the New Zealand Contracts (Privity) Act 1982 before it was adopted for the English act.

The third party must be identified by name or as a member of a particular group, and does not need to exist when the contract was made. This can cause problems, however – if, for example, a party (party A) enters a contract to have another party (party B) construct a building, and A later sells the building to C who finds that it has structural problems, C has no cause of action against B because he was not named in the original contract.

If a third party chooses to enforce the terms of a contract, he can do so against the promisor and has the right to any remedy that would be available if he was party to the contract, such as specific performance. An exception to this is the ability to terminate the contract and have it rendered void, since the Law Commission believed that "the third party should not be entitled to terminate the contract for breach as this may be contrary to the promisee's wishes or interests".

Although the topic is not discussed in the Law Commission's report or the bill itself, it is generally considered that the third party has no rights against the promisee, regardless of his rights against the promisor. Andrew Burrows, who prepared the Law Commission's report, said that the third party does not acquire rights against the promisee, something Guenter Treitel has also suggested. A different stance is taken in Scots law, where a promisee has a duty to the third party to ensure performance of the contract.

=== Section 2: Variation and rescission of contract ===
Section 2 of the act governs changes to and rescission of contracts. It prevents parties to a contract rescinding it or altering it to remove or modify the terms that affect the third party if the third party has told the promisor that he "assents" to the term, or that he has relied on the contract (and the promisor knows this, or could be expected to have known this). This is only the default position; the act allows parties to insert clauses into the contract which allow them to rescind or alter the contract without the consent of the third party if they so choose. The courts can ignore the consent of the third party and allow the promisor and promisee to change the contract if the third party is mentally incapable, unfindable or if it is impossible to tell if the third party has truly consented. At the same time the courts may add conditions to that decision, such as requiring the promisor or promisee to pay the third party compensation.

Assenting is considered complete when the third party "communicates" his assent to the promisor, which can be done in a variety of ways, including by post. The contract may specify the communication method(s), and if it does, any other method is not valid.

The third party does not have to have suffered a detriment from his "reliance"; it is enough that he has simply relied on the contract. It must be the third party who relied on the term, rather than another party closely related to the third party. If the third party relies on the terms of the contract, which are then breached, he can not only claim damages for any loss he suffered from relying on the contract but also for "standard" damages, such as loss of profit.

=== Section 3: Defences available to promisor ===
Section 3 covers the defences available to the promisor if the third party brings an action against him. In a dispute between the promisor and the third party over a term, the promisor can rely on any defence he would have if the dispute was with the promisee, as long as the defence is applicable to the term under dispute. The Law Commission directly rejected the suggestion that the promisor should have every defence in a dispute with a third party that he would have in a dispute with the promisee (regardless of whether or not it could be applied to the disputed term). Section 3 is directly modelled on the similar section of the New Zealand Contracts (Privity) Act 1982.

The act allows the promisor to list additional defences that can be used against the third party in the contract, which can be used to get around the Law Commission's decision not to give the promisor equal defences against both the third party and promisee by simply listing those additional defences the promisor would like access to.

The act takes a different attitude for the defences available to the third party in counterclaims, with the Law Commission saying that to apply the same rules would be "misleading and unnecessarily complex". This is because the counterclaim may be more valuable than the original claim, which would impose an obligation on the third party to pay the promisor money, something not appropriate under the doctrine of privity which prohibits the placing of a burden or obligation on a third party. Again, the parties to the contract can insert a clause overriding this.

=== Section 4: Enforcement of contract by promisee ===
Section 4 preserves the right of the promisee to enforce any term of the contract. This allows the promisee to sue for any losses to themselves, but not for losses of the third party.

=== Section 5: Protection of promisor from double liability ===
Section 5 helps protect the promisor from double liability (having to pay two sets of damages for the same breach, one to the third party and one to the promisee) if the promisor breaches the contract. It does so in a very limited way, though – the promisor is only protected if he has first paid damages to the promisee, and the third party's claim comes after that. In addition the act only limits damages paid in this situation, it does not eliminate them. If the promisee brings an action against the promisor and wins, any damages paid to the third party in a subsequent action must take the previous damages paid to the promisee into account.

If the third party brings an action, and the promisee does so afterwards then the promisee cannot claim any damages. This is because the Law Commission felt that if the third party claimed compensation for the breach, the promisee would have no interest in the dispute any more. This fails to take into account situations where the promisee has suffered personal loss from the breach of contract. If the promisee brings an action first then the third party is prohibited from doing so, unless the promisee's action fails, in which case the third party is free to pursue his own claim.

=== Section 6: Exceptions ===
Section 6 creates exceptions to the scope of the act. While the act applies to standard contracts and contracts made by deeds, it does not apply to contracts made as a part of negotiable instruments, bills of exchange or promissory notes, or contracts governed by the Companies Act 1985, such as articles of association. The act also excludes contracts for the transport of goods across national lines, as these fall under international trade laws, and terms in an employment contract which allow a third party to sue an employee. These were excluded for one of two reasons – either the position of third parties in those types of contract are too well established to be changed easily, or there are reasons of public policy that make it a bad idea to allow the involvement of third parties, such as contracts of employment.

=== Section 7: Supplementary provisions relating to third party ===
Section 7(1) confirms that any exceptions to the rule of privity which existed prior to the 1999 act remain valid. This confirms the act does not supersede impliedly earlier protection of the law.

Section 7(2) disapplies section 2(2) of the Unfair Contract Terms Act 1977, which restricts the exclusion of liability for negligence other than death or personal injury to terms satisfying the requirement of reasonableness, where the negligence consists of the breach of an obligation arising from a term of a contract and the person seeking to enforce it is a third party acting in reliance on section 1. Section 7(3) extends the references in sections 5 and 8 of the Limitation Act 1980 to actions founded on a simple contract and actions upon a specialty to include actions brought by a third party in reliance on section 1. Weakening the act's effect, section 7(4) prevents a third party from being treated as a party to the contract for the purposes of any other act, or any instrument made under one, by virtue of section 1(5) or 3(4) or (6).

=== Section 8: Arbitration provisions ===
The act allows the insertion of arbitration clauses, which require the parties to submit to specific arbitration procedures in the event of disputes. The Law Commission initially excluded arbitration clauses from the act, but later amended their draft bill so as to allow third parties to take advantage of arbitration proceedings. The provisions on arbitration clauses were not received well during the bill's passage through Parliament, and were described as "very messy", "a labyrinth" and "a mire". The Commission initially proposed that jurisdiction clauses be specifically excluded from the act. During the bill's passage through Parliament, however, this exclusion disappeared, and the act's explanatory notes assume that the act covers jurisdiction clauses.

=== Section 9: Northern Ireland ===
Section 9 takes into account the differences between English and Northern Irish law, and modifies how the act should be interpreted in Northern Ireland. Particularly it replaced the reference in section 6(2) to the Companies Act 1985 with the Northern Irish equivalent, the Companies (Northern Ireland) Order 1986, and replaced section 7(3) with a reference to the Limitation (Northern Ireland) Order 1989. Section 9 also repealed section 5, and parts of section 6, of the Law Reform (Husband and Wife) (Northern Ireland) Act 1964.

== Scope and implementation ==
The act applies in England and Wales and Northern Ireland, but not Scotland, which has its own rules on privity and the rights of third parties. The act came into law on 11 November 1999 when it received royal assent, but the full provisions of the act did not come into force until May 2000. The act made clear that contracts negotiated during a six-month "twilight period" after the act's passage fell under its provisions if they included language saying that they had been made under the terms of the act.

The act had various consequences – as well as allowing third parties to enforce terms it also made a number of exceptions to the basic rule unnecessary, such as claiming on behalf of another party as seen in Jackson v Horizon Holidays Ltd [1975] 1 WLR 1468. It did not repeal or abolish these exceptions, however, and this allows the courts to accept cases based on the old common law exceptions as well as the 1999 act. The act specifically allows parties to exempt the provisions of the act from contracts, allowing them a way out if they so choose.

The reaction from the judiciary, legal profession and academia was largely supportive of the act; the doctrine of privity had long been thought unfair. The act has been criticised somewhat by the construction industry for its refusal to make an exception for complex construction contracts, and for the vagueness of the term "purports to confer a benefit". It is generally accepted, however, that it would be unfair to make an exception for a particular industry, and case law has clarified the meaning of "purports to confer a benefit". It is also now routine in commercial contexts for enforcement by third parties to be excluded under the terms of the contract, as permitted by section 1(2) of the act.

== Subsequent developments ==
Section 6(2A), excluding third-party rights in the case of the incorporation document of a limited liability partnership and any agreement determining the mutual rights and duties of its members, was inserted by the Limited Liability Partnerships Regulations 2001 (SI 2001/1090), with effect from 6 April 2001 in England and Wales, and, for Northern Ireland, by the Limited Liability Partnerships Regulations (Northern Ireland) 2004 (SR 2004/307), with effect from 13 September 2004.

The reference in section 6(8)(a) to the convention on the international carriage of goods by rail was amended by the Railways (Convention on International Carriage by Rail) Regulations 2005 (SI 2005/2092). With effect from 1 October 2009, the Companies Act 2006 (Consequential Amendments, Transitional Provisions and Savings) Order 2009 (SI 2009/1941) replaced the reference in section 6(2) to section 14 of the Companies Act 1985 with a reference to section 33 of the Companies Act 2006 and omitted section 9(2), the Northern Ireland modification of that reference. Section 2(7), on the jurisdiction to dispense with a third party's consent, was amended by the Crime and Courts Act 2013 with effect from 22 April 2014, so that in England and Wales it is exercisable by both the High Court and the county court.

== Bibliography ==
- Andrews, Neil (2001). "Strangers to justice no longer: the reversal of the privity rule under the Contracts (Rights of Third Parties) Act 1999". Cambridge Law Journal. 60 (2): 353–381. doi:10.1017/S0008197301000150.
- Bridge, Michael (2001). "Privity of contract; Third parties". Edinburgh Law Review. 5 (1): 85–102. doi:10.3366/elr.2001.5.1.85.
- Burrows, Andrew (1996). Reforming Privity of Contract: Law Commission Report No. 242. HMSO.
- Carson, Veronica; Michael Clode (2000). "The end of privity of contract in the United Kingdom?". Journal of International Financial Markets. 2 (2): 61.
- Dean, Meryll (2000). "Removing a blot on the landscape – the reform of the doctrine of privity". Journal of Business Law (2): 143–152.
- Flannigan, Robert (October 1987). "Privity – the end of an era (error)". Law Quarterly Review. 103 (4): 564–593.
- Furmston, Michael (2007). Law of Contract (15th ed.). Oxford University Press. ISBN 978-0-19-928756-7.
- Hughes, Martin (2000). "Contracts (Rights Of Third Parties) Act 1999". Butterworths Journal of International Banking and Financial Law. 14 (10): 431–436.
- Jacobs, Edward (1986). "Judicial reform of privity and consideration". Journal of Business Law (6): 466–473.
- MacMillan, Catharine (2000). "A Birthday Present for Lord Denning: The Contracts (Rights of Third Parties) Act 1999". Modern Law Review. 63 (5): 721–738. doi:10.1111/1468-2230.00288. JSTOR 1097046.
- McKendrick, Ewan (2007). Contract Law (7th ed.). Palgrave Macmillan. ISBN 0-230-01883-1.
- Mulcahy, Linda (2008). Contract Law in Perspective (5th ed.). Routledge. ISBN 978-0-415-44432-3.
- Palmer, Vernon V. (1989). "The History of Privity – The Formative Period (1500–1680)". The American Journal of Legal History. 33 (1). Temple University: 3–52. doi:10.2307/845785. JSTOR 845785.
- Roe, Thomas (2000). "Contractual Intention under Section 1(1)(b) and 1(2) of the Contracts (Rights of Third Parties) Act 1999". The Modern Law Review. 63 (6): 887–894. doi:10.1111/1468-2230.00299. JSTOR 1097262.
- Treitel, Guenter (1983). An Outline of the Law of Contract (6th ed.). Oxford University Press. ISBN 0-406-97268-0.
- Treitel, Guenter (2003). Law of Contract (11th ed.). Sweet & Maxwell. ISBN 0-421-78850-X.
- Turner, Chris (2007). Unlocking Contract Law (2nd ed.). Hodder Arnold. ISBN 978-0-340-94196-6.
- Whincup, Michael (2006). Contract law and practice: the English system with Scottish, Commonwealth, and Continental comparisons. Kluwer Law International. ISBN 978-90-411-2521-7.
