= Tweddle v Atkinson =

Landmark English legal case about privity

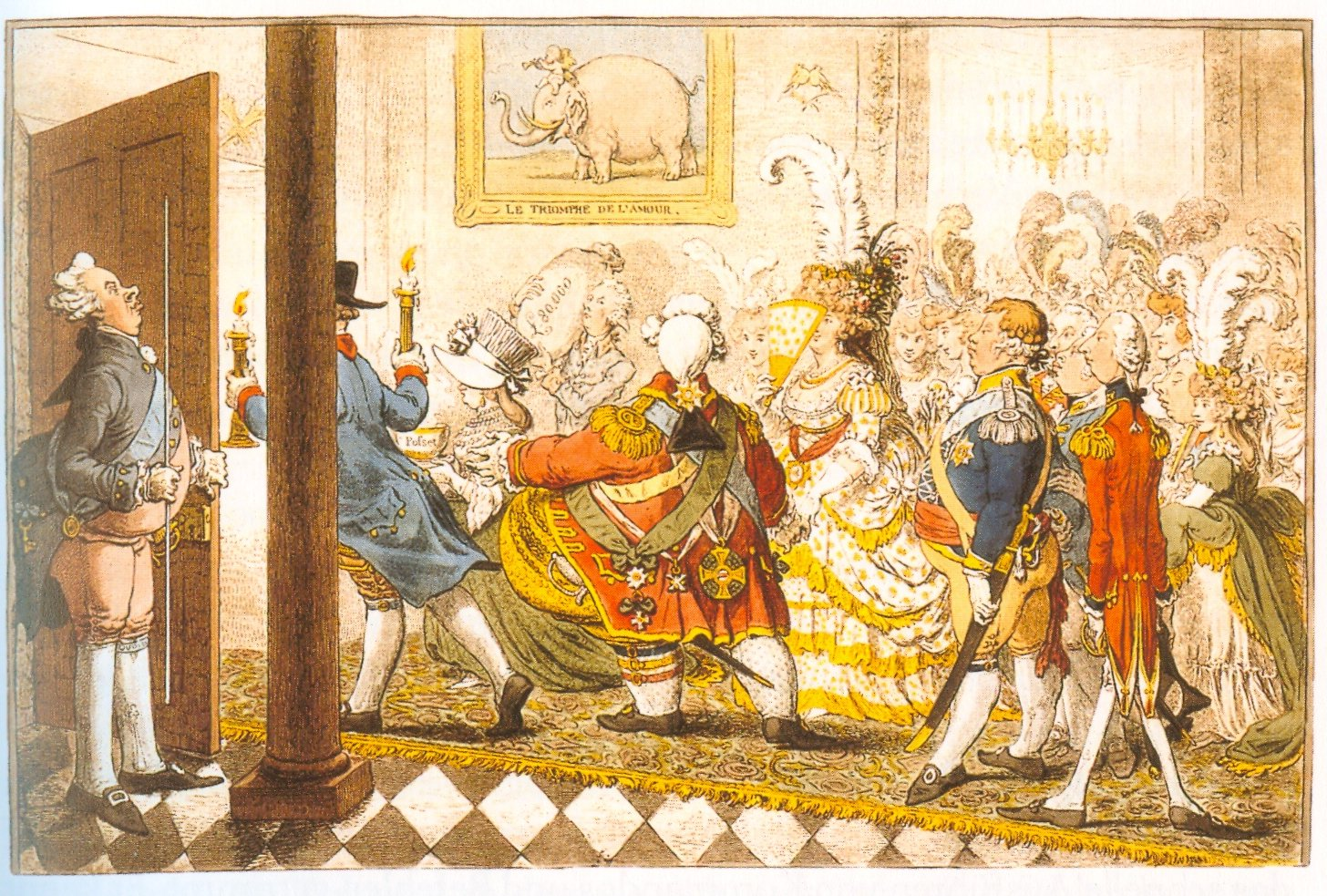
- Court: High Court of Justice, Queen's Bench Division
- Decided: 7 June 1861
- Citations: [1861] EWHC QB J57]; (1861) 1 B&S 393; (1861) 121 ER 762
- Transcript

Court membership
- Judges sitting: Wightman J, Crompton J, Blackburn J

Keywords
- privity, consideration

Tweddle v Atkinson [1861] EWHC J57 (QB), (1861) 1 B&S 393 is an English contract law case concerning the principle of privity of contract and consideration. Its panel of appeal judges reinforced that the doctrine of privity meant that only those who are party to an agreement (outside of one of the well-established exceptional relationships such as agency, bailment or trusteeship) may sue or be sued on it and established the principle that "consideration must flow from the promisee".

== Facts ==
John Tweddle and William Guy mutually agreed in writing to pay sums of money (£100 and £200, respectively) to Tweddle's son William (who was engaged to Guy's daughter). Guy then died before payment. John Tweddle died before he could sue for the money from Guys estate. When the estate would not pay, William Tweddle then sued Mr Atkinson, the executor of Guy's estate, for the promised £200.

== Judgment ==
The court held that the suit would not succeed as no stranger to the consideration may enforce a contract, although made for his benefit. The court ruled that a promisee cannot bring an action unless the consideration for the promise moved from him. Consideration must move from party entitled to sue upon the contract. No legal entitlement is conferred on third parties to an agreement. Third parties to a contract do not derive any rights from that agreement nor are they subject to any burdens imposed by it. It was left unanswered if the groom's father could have successfully sued the estate instead.

== Critique ==
The case's summary of the doctrine of privity in the common law was upheld in Dunlop v Selfridge (1915) and Beswick v Beswick (1967), but it was frequently criticised for obstructing the wishes of the contracting parties. The two fathers intended that the sums should be paid to the groom, and their wishes were defeated. (Note that this case preceded the Married Women's Property Act 1882, which enabled married women to retain their property.) In the 1930s the Law Reform Committee proposed amendment of the doctrine but World War II intervened and nothing was done. Earlier in Beswick v Beswick, Master of the Rolls Lord Denning construed the Law of Property Act 1925 to try to overthrow the doctrine, but on appeal, the House of Lords Judicial Committee, the court of final appeal, criticised his extreme literal interpretation and declared the doctrine intact. Many legal devices exist to circumvent the doctrines (such as the use of negotiable instruments), the greatest being the Contracts (Rights of Third Parties) Act 1999 which allows, in general, a beneficiary or an identified third party to enforce terms to its benefit in a contract made by others.

== See also ==
- English contract law
- Intention
- Promise
- "Contracts (Rights of Third Parties) Bill [Lords]". House of Commons Publications and Records - Second Reading Committee. Archived from the original on 27 June 2007.
- Andrews, Neil (25 July 2001). "Strangers to justice no longer: the reversal of the privity rule under the Contracts (Rights of Third Parties) Act 1999". The Cambridge Law Journal. 60 (2): 353–381. doi:10.1017/S0008197301000150. S2CID 145805266.
- "Information and Communications Technology: Source Code Escrow and the Contracts (Rights of Third Parties) Act 1999". Intellectual Property and Information Technology Update. Archived from the original on 28 September 2007.
