= Stephen Guest =

New Zealand lawyer

Stephen Guest, Barrister (Inner Temple) and Barrister and Solicitor (N.Z. High Court), is emeritus professor of legal philosophy at University College London (UCL) Faculty of Laws.

== Education ==
Guest obtained his BA in Philosophy (1971) and his LLB (1973) at the University of Otago, teaching logic in the philosophy department there for two years despite himself being an undergraduate. He then read for a BLitt at University College, Oxford (1978) under Professor Ronald Dworkin, and later received a PhD at UCL in 1991.

== Career ==
Guest became a barrister and solicitor in New Zealand and a barrister of the Inner Temple in London, with chambers at 199 Strand from 1993 to 2005.

He has also held various academic positions, mostly at UCL, but has also been a visiting scholar at NYU Law in 1987 and 1996, Visiting Professor in Jurisprudence in the Faculty of Law at the University of Otago 2005-6 and British Academy/Leverhulme Senior Research Fellow 2006-7.

At UCL, Guest has lectured in the law faculty, and was sub-dean and faculty tutor 1980-85, vice-dean and deputy head of department 1993-95 and director of research students 2004-6. He also founded the student-edited UCL Jurisprudence Review in 1994, editing it until 2008.

== Works ==
Amongst his major work is his account of Ronald Dworkin's legal, political and moral philosophy in Ronald Dworkin, Stanford University Press, 2012.
