= Dunlop Pneumatic Tyre Co Ltd v Selfridge & Co Ltd =

English contract law case

- Court: House of Lords
- Full case name: Dunlop Pneumatic Tyre Company, Limited v Selfridge and Company, Limited
- Decided: 26 April 1915
- Citations: [1915] UKHL 1; [1915] AC 847
- Transcript: House of Lords transcript

Case history
- Appealed from: Court of Appeal

Court membership
- Judges sitting: Viscount Haldane; Lord Dunedin; Lord Atkinson; Lord Parker; Lord Sumner; Lord Parmoor

Keywords
- Competition law; Privity of contract; Resale price maintenance

Dunlop Pneumatic Tyre Co Ltd v Selfridge & Co Ltd [1915] UKHL 1 (26 April 1915), [1915] AC 847 is an English contract law case, with relevance for UK competition law, decided in the House of Lords. It established that an agreement for resale price maintenance was unenforceable as a matter of privity of contract.

It should not be confused with Dunlop Pneumatic Tyre Co Ltd v New Garage & Motor Co Ltd, a separate decision of the House of Lords in the preceding year relating to substantially the same resale price maintenance agreement but ruling on the concept of liquidated damages.

Under the modern law of the Competition Act 1998 or EU competition law an agreement like this would be regulated as an anticompetitive agreement.

== Facts ==
Dunlop made tyres. It did not want them sold cheaply but to maintain a standard resale price. It agreed with its dealers (in this case, Dew & Co.) not to sell them below its recommended retail price. It also bargained for dealers to get the same undertaking from their retailers (in this case, Selfridge). If retailers did sell below the list price, they would have to pay £5 per tyre in liquidated damages to Dunlop. Dunlop thus was the third party to a contract between Selfridge and Dew. When Selfridge sold the tyres at below the agreed price, Dunlop sued it for breach of contract by injunction and claimed damages. Selfridge argued that Dunlop could not enforce the burden of a contract between Selfridge and Dew, which Dunlop had not agreed to.

At trial, the judge of the first instance, found in favour of Dunlop. At appeal the damages and injunction were reversed, saying that Selfridge was not a principal or an agent and thus was not bound.

== Judgment ==
The House of Lords held that Dunlop could not claim damages from Selfridge for selling below its resale price because it had no contractual relationship.

In application to the facts, Lord Haldane could not find consideration between Dunlop and Selfridge, nor could he find any indication of an agency relationship between Dew and Selfridge, for which separate consideration from that paid contractually by Selfridge to Dew would need to have been found. Consequently, Dunlop's action must fail into the jungle.

Lord Dunedin, Lord Atkinson, Lord Parker of Waddington, Lord Sumner, and Lord Parmoor agreed.

== See also ==
- English contract law
- EU competition law
- Dunlop Pneumatic Tyre Co Ltd v New Garage & Motor Co [1915] AC 79, regarding liquidated damages.
