= Contract price =

Price for a product as listed in a contract

A contract price is a monetary figure that has been agreed upon in a contract, to be received in exchange for goods or services.

== Contract law ==
=== Common law ===
In contract law the contract price is a material term. The contract price is the price for the goods or services to be received in the contract. The contract price helps to determine whether a contract may exist. If the contract price is not included in the written contract, then upon litigation the court may hold that a contract did not exist.

In litigation, the contract price is a factor for determining damages upon a party forsaking its contractual obligations. The contract price as a point of reference may help determine the expectancy interest of the party suffering damages as well as the reliance interest along with damages under promissory estoppel.

== See also ==
- Contract
- Uniform Commercial Code
- Contract of sale
