= List of United States Supreme Court cases, volume 132 =

Supreme Court of the United States
- Interactive map of Supreme Court of the United States
- 38°53′26″N 77°00′16″W
- Established: March 4, 1789; 236 years ago
- Location: Washington, D.C.
- Coordinates: 38°53′26″N 77°00′16″W
- Composition method: Presidential nomination with Senate confirmation
- Authorised by: Constitution of the United States, Art. III, § 1
- Judge term length: life tenure, subject to impeachment and removal
- Number of positions: 9 (by statute)
- Website: supremecourt.gov

This is a list of cases reported in volume 132 of United States Reports, decided by the Supreme Court of the United States in 1889 and 1890.

== Justices of the Supreme Court at the time of volume 132 U.S. ==
The Supreme Court is established by Article III, Section 1 of the Constitution of the United States, which says: "The judicial Power of the United States, shall be vested in one supreme Court . . .". The size of the Court is not specified; the Constitution leaves it to Congress to set the number of justices. Under the Judiciary Act of 1789 Congress originally fixed the number of justices at six (one chief justice and five associate justices). Since 1789 Congress has varied the size of the Court from six to seven, nine, ten, and back to nine justices (always including one chief justice).

When the cases in volume 132 U.S. were decided the Court comprised the following nine members:

Portrait	Justice	Office	Home State	Succeeded	Date confirmed by the Senate (Vote)	Tenure on Supreme Court
	Melville Fuller	Chief Justice	Illinois	Morrison Waite	July 20, 1888 (41–20)	October 8, 1888 – July 4, 1910 (Died)
	Samuel Freeman Miller	Associate Justice	Iowa	Peter Vivian Daniel	July 16, 1862 (Acclamation)	July 21, 1862 – October 13, 1890 (Died)
	Stephen Johnson Field	Associate Justice	California	newly created seat	March 10, 1863 (Acclamation)	May 10, 1863 – December 1, 1897 (Retired)
	Joseph P. Bradley	Associate Justice	New Jersey	newly created seat	March 21, 1870 (46–9)	March 23, 1870 – January 22, 1892 (Died)
	John Marshall Harlan	Associate Justice	Kentucky	David Davis	November 29, 1877 (Acclamation)	December 10, 1877 – October 14, 1911 (Died)
	Horace Gray	Associate Justice	Massachusetts	Nathan Clifford	December 20, 1881 (51–5)	January 9, 1882 – September 15, 1902 (Died)
	Samuel Blatchford	Associate Justice	New York	Ward Hunt	March 22, 1882 (Acclamation)	April 3, 1882 – July 7, 1893 (Died)
	Lucius Quintus Cincinnatus Lamar	Associate Justice	Mississippi	William Burnham Woods	January 16, 1888 (32–28)	January 18, 1888 – January 23, 1893 (Died)
	David Josiah Brewer	Associate Justice	Kansas	Stanley Matthews	December 18, 1889 (53–11)	January 6, 1890 – March 28, 1910 (Died)

== Notable Case in 132 U.S. ==
=== Smith v. Bolles ===
Smith v. Bolles, 132 U.S. 125 (1889), was an action to recover out-of-pocket damages for alleged fraudulent representations in the sale of shares of mining stock. The case is important in contract law, as to legal remedies and compensating expectancies. The Supreme Court held that the measure of damages is not the difference between the contract price and the fair market value if the property had been properly represented, but rather what the plaintiff had lost by being deceived into making the purchase.

== Citation style ==
Under the Judiciary Act of 1789 the federal court structure at the time comprised District Courts, which had general trial jurisdiction; Circuit Courts, which had mixed trial and appellate (from the US District Courts) jurisdiction; and the United States Supreme Court, which had appellate jurisdiction over the federal District and Circuit courts—and for certain issues over state courts. The Supreme Court also had limited original jurisdiction (i.e., in which cases could be filed directly with the Supreme Court without first having been heard by a lower federal or state court). There were one or more federal District Courts and/or Circuit Courts in each state, territory, or other geographical region.

Bluebook citation style is used for case names, citations, and jurisdictions.

- "C.C.D." = United States Circuit Court for the District of . . .
  - e.g.,"C.C.D.N.J." = United States Circuit Court for the District of New Jersey
- "D." = United States District Court for the District of . . .
  - e.g.,"D. Mass." = United States District Court for the District of Massachusetts
- "E." = Eastern; "M." = Middle; "N." = Northern; "S." = Southern; "W." = Western
  - e.g.,"C.C.S.D.N.Y." = United States Circuit Court for the Southern District of New York
  - e.g.,"M.D. Ala." = United States District Court for the Middle District of Alabama
- "Ct. Cl." = United States Court of Claims
- The abbreviation of a state's name alone indicates the highest appellate court in that state's judiciary at the time.
  - e.g.,"Pa." = Supreme Court of Pennsylvania
  - e.g.,"Me." = Supreme Judicial Court of Maine

== List of cases in volume 132 U.S. ==
Case Name	Page & year	Opinion of the Court	Concurring opinion(s)	Dissenting opinion(s)	Lower Court	Disposition
Metropolitan R.R. Co. v. District of Columbia	1 (1889)	Bradley	none	none	Sup. Ct. D.C.	reversed
Knox Cnty. v. Harshman	14 (1889)	Fuller	none	none	C.C.E.D. Mo.	supersedeas denied
Robertson v. Frank Bros. Co.	17 (1889)	Bradley	none	none	C.C.S.D.N.Y.	affirmed
Jackson v. Allen	27 (1889)	Fuller	none	none	C.C.E.D. La.	reversed
Campbell v. Wade	34 (1889)	Field	none	none	Tex.	affirmed
Brush v. Condit	39 (1889)	Blatchford	none	none	C.C.S.D.N.Y.	affirmed
Dent v. Ferguson	50 (1889)	Lamar	none	none	C.C.W.D. Tenn.	reversed
Thompson v. White W.V.R.R. Co.	68 (1889)	Field	none	none	C.C.D. Ind.	affirmed
Pennsylvania R.R. Co. v. Miller	75 (1889)	Blatchford	none	none	Phila. Cnty. Ct. Com. Pl.	affirmed
Aron v. Manhattan Ry. Co.	84 (1889)	Blatchford	none	none	C.C.S.D.N.Y.	affirmed
Keystone M.I. Co. v. Martin	91 (1889)	Blatchford	none	none	C.C.E.D. Ark.	dismissed
Day v. Fair Haven & W. Ry. Co.	98 (1889)	Fuller	none	none	C.C.D. Conn.	affirmed
Roemer v. Neumann	103 (1889)	Gray	none	none	C.C.S.D.N.Y.	affirmed
Scotland Cnty. v. Hill	107 (1889)	Harlan	none	none	C.C.E.D. Mo.	affirmed
Hill v. Sumner	118 (1889)	Miller	none	none	C.C.D. Colo.	affirmed
Smith v. Bolles	125 (1889)	Fuller	none	none	C.C.N.D. Ohio	reversed
Cross v. North Carolina	131 (1889)	Harlan	none	none	N.C.	affirmed
First Nat'l Bank v. Morgan	141 (1889)	Harlan	none	none	N.C.	affirmed
Boylan v. Hot Springs R.R. Co.	146 (1889)	Gray	none	none	C.C.N.D. Ill.	affirmed
Glenn v. Sumner	152 (1889)	Gray	none	none	C.C.W.D.N.C.	affirmed
Robertson v. Glendinning	158 (1889)	Fuller	none	none	C.C.S.D.N.Y.	reversed
Watson v. Cincinnati et al. Ry. Co.	161 (1889)	Fuller	none	none	C.C.D. Ind.	affirmed
Merritt v. Tiffany	167 (1889)	Field	none	none	C.C.S.D.N.Y.	reversed
Anthony v. Louisville & N.R.R. Co.	172 (1889)	Field	none	none	C.C.E.D. Mo.	affirmed
Yazoo et al. R.R. Co. v. Thomas	174 (1889)	Fuller	none	none	Miss.	affirmed
Yazoo et al. R.R. Co. v. Commissioners	190 (1889)	Fuller	none	none	C.C.S.D. Miss.	affirmed
Missouri P. Ry. Co. v. Chicago et al. R.R. Co.	191 (1889)	Gray	none	none	C.C.E.D. Mo.	affirmed
Raimond v. Terrebonne Parish	192 (1889)	Gray	none	none	C.C.E.D. La.	affirmed
Marchand v. Emken	195 (1889)	Blatchford	none	none	C.C.S.D.N.Y.	affirmed
Royer v. Roth	201 (1889)	Blatchford	none	none	C.C.D. Cal.	affirmed
Winters v. Ethell	207 (1889)	Blatchford	none	none	Sup. Ct. Terr. Idaho	dismissed
City of Chanute v. Trader	210 (1889)	Blatchford	none	none	C.C.D. Kan.	affirmed
Oregon I. Co. v. Excelsior C. Co.	215 (1889)	Blatchford	none	none	C.C.N.D. Cal.	reversed
Brown v. Rank	216 (1889)	Fuller	none	none	Sup. Ct. Terr. Wash.	affirmed
Vane v. Newcombe	220 (1889)	Blatchford	none	none	C.C.D. Ind.	affirmed
Redfield v. Parks	239 (1889)	Miller	none	none	C.C.E.D. Ark.	reversed
Pickhardt v. Merritt	252 (1889)	Blatchford	none	none	C.C.S.D.N.Y.	affirmed
Dahl v. Raunheim	260 (1889)	Field	none	none	Sup. Ct. Terr. Mont.	affirmed
Dahl v. Montana C. Co.	264 (1889)	Field	none	none	Sup. Ct. Terr. Mont.	affirmed
Young v. Parker's Adm'r	267 (1889)	Fuller	none	none	D.W. Va.	reversed
United States v. Barlow	271 (1889)	Field	none	none	C.C.D. Colo.	reversed
Fritts v. Palmer	282 (1889)	Harlan	none	Miller	C.C.D. Colo.	reversed
City of Cleveland v. King	295 (1889)	Harlan	none	none	C.C.N.D. Ohio	affirmed
Continental L. Ins. Co. v. Chamberlain	304 (1889)	Harlan	none	none	C.C.N.D. Iowa	affirmed
Roemer v. Peddie	313 (1889)	Blatchford	none	none	C.C.S.D.N.Y.	affirmed
Cleaveland v. G.C. Richardson & Co.	318 (1889)	Blatchford	none	none	C.C.N.D. Ill.	reversed
United States v. Davis	334 (1889)	Lamar	none	none	D. Md.	affirmed
Bachrack v. Norton	337 (1889)	Bradley	none	none	C.C.N.D. Tex.	reversed
Young v. Clarendon Twp.	340 (1889)	Lamar	none	none	C.C.E.D. Mich.	affirmed
Hastings et al. Co. v. Whitney	357 (1889)	Lamar	none	none	Minn.	affirmed
Klein v. Hoffheimer Bros.	367 (1889)	Miller	none	none	C.C.N.D. Tex.	affirmed
Bradley v. H.B. Claflin & Co.	379 (1889)	Miller	none	none	C.C.E.D. La.	reversed
Ayers v. Watson	394 (1889)	Miller	none	none	C.C.N.D. Tex.	reversed
Hume v. United States	406 (1889)	Fuller	none	none	Ct. Cl.	affirmed
Greene v. Taylor	415 (1889)	Blatchford	none	none	C.C.N.D. Ill.	reversed
McGillin v. Bennett	445 (1889)	Blatchford	none	none	C.C.N.D. Ill.	affirmed
Robertson v. Gerdan	454 (1889)	Blatchford	none	none	C.C.S.D.N.Y.	reversed
Robertson v. Rosenthal	460 (1889)	Fuller	none	none	C.C.S.D.N.Y.	reversed
Pennie v. Reis	464 (1889)	Field	none	none	Cal.	affirmed
Western Union T. Co. v. Alabama Bd. As'ment	472 (1889)	Miller	none	none	Ala.	reversed
Rio Grande R.R. Co. v. Gomila	478 (1889)	Field	none	none	C.C.E.D. La.	reversed
Dravo v. Fabel	487 (1889)	Harlan	none	none	C.C.W.D. Pa.	affirmed
Robertson v. Bradbury	491 (1889)	Bradley	none	none	C.C.S.D.N.Y.	affirmed
Muller v. Norton	501 (1889)	Lamar	none	none	C.C.N.D. Tex.	reversed
Idaho et al. Co. v. Bradbury	509 (1889)	Gray	none	none	Sup. Ct. Terr. Idaho	affirmed
Singer Mfg. Co. v. Rahn	518 (1889)	Gray	none	none	C.C.D. Minn.	affirmed
Sugg v. Thornton	524 (1889)	Fuller	none	none	Tex.	affirmed
Pacific E. Co. v. Malin	531 (1889)	Fuller	none	none	C.C.W.D. Tex.	affirmed
Paul v. Cullum	539 (1889)	Harlan	none	none	Sup. Ct. Terr. Ariz.	affirmed
Hale v. Akers	554 (1889)	Blatchford	none	none	Cal.	dismissed
Rio Grande R.R. Co. v. Vinet	565 (1889)	Miller	none	none	C.C.E.D. La.	affirmed
Graves v. Corbin	571 (1890)	Blatchford	none	none	C.C.N.D. Ill.	reversed
Richmond v. Blake	592 (1890)	Harlan	none	Field	C.C.S.D.N.Y.	affirmed
Louisville & N.R.R. Co. v. Wangelin	599 (1890)	Gray	none	none	C.C.S.D. Ill.	affirmed
Avery v. Cleary	604 (1890)	Harlan	none	none	C.C.D. Mass.	reversed
Cleary v. Ellis F. Co.	612 (1890)	Harlan	none	none	C.C.D. Mass.	affirmed
Robertson v. Edelhoff	614 (1890)	Blatchford	none	none	C.C.S.D.N.Y.	affirmed
Patrick v. Graham	627 (1890)	Miller	none	none	C.C.D. Colo.	affirmed
Clayton v. Utah	632 (1890)	Miller	none	none	Sup. Ct. Terr. Utah	affirmed
Jack v. Utah ex rel. Dickson	643 (1890)	Miller	none	none	Sup. Ct. Terr. Utah	affirmed
United States v. Carr	644 (1890)	Fuller	none	none	Ct. Cl.	reversed
Forbes L. Mfg. Co. v. Worthington	655 (1889)	Fuller	none	none	C.C.D. Mass.	affirmed
Miller v. Texas & P. Ry. Co.	662 (1890)	Bradley	none	none	C.C.N.D. Tex.	affirmed
Hill v. Wooster	693 (1890)	Blatchford	none	none	C.C.D. Vt.	reversed
