= Smith v. Bolles =

- Supreme Court of the United States

Argued October 31, 1889 Decided November 11, 1889
- Full case name: Smith v. Bolles
- Citations: 132 U.S. 125 (more) 10 S. Ct. 39; 33 L. Ed. 279

Case history
- Subsequent: Error to the Circuit Court of the United States for the Northern District of Ohio

Holding
- Defendant is bound to make good the loss sustained, such as the moneys the plaintiff had paid out and interest, and any other outlay legitimately attributable to defendant's fraudulent conduct; but this liability did not include the expected fruits of an unrealized speculation.

Court membership
- Chief Justice Melville Fuller Associate Justices Samuel F. Miller · Stephen J. Field; Joseph P. Bradley · John M. Harlan; Horace Gray · Samuel Blatchford; Lucius Q. C. Lamar II

Case opinion
- Majority: Fuller, joined by unanimous

Smith v. Bolles, 132 U.S. 125 (1889), was an action to recover out-of-pocket damages for alleged fraudulent representations in the sale of shares of mining stock. The plaintiff was denied benefit of the bargain damages. The case is important in contract law, specifically legal remedies and compensating expectancies.

== Facts ==
Plaintiff, Richard J. Bolles, agreed to buy from defendant Lewis W. Smith four thousand shares of the stock, at $1.50 per share. The contract was completed in March 1880, by the payment of $6,000. Plaintiff then alleged that defendant's representations regarding the stock were false and fraudulent, and that in fact the stock was worthless. Plaintiff claimed furthermore that had the representations been true, the stock would now be worth $10 per share, and so plaintiff claimed that he had sustained damages of $40,000.

== Judgment ==
Chief Justice Fuller disagreed, saying the measure of damages is not the difference between the contract price and the fair market value if the property had been properly represented. The trial court should not have looked to what the plaintiff might have gained if the representations had been true, but rather what he had lost by being deceived into the purchase. Defendant is "bound to make good the loss sustained, such as the moneys the plaintiff had paid out and interest, and any other outlay legitimately attributable to defendant's fraudulent conduct; but this liability did not include the expected fruits of an unrealized speculation."

The judgment was reversed, with directions to grant a new trial.

== See also ==
- Expectation damages
- List of United States Supreme Court cases, volume 132
- Erlanger v New Sombrero Phosphate Co (1878) 3 App Cas 1218
- Derry v Peek
