= East v Maurer =

English contract law case

East v Maurer[1991] EWCA Civ 6
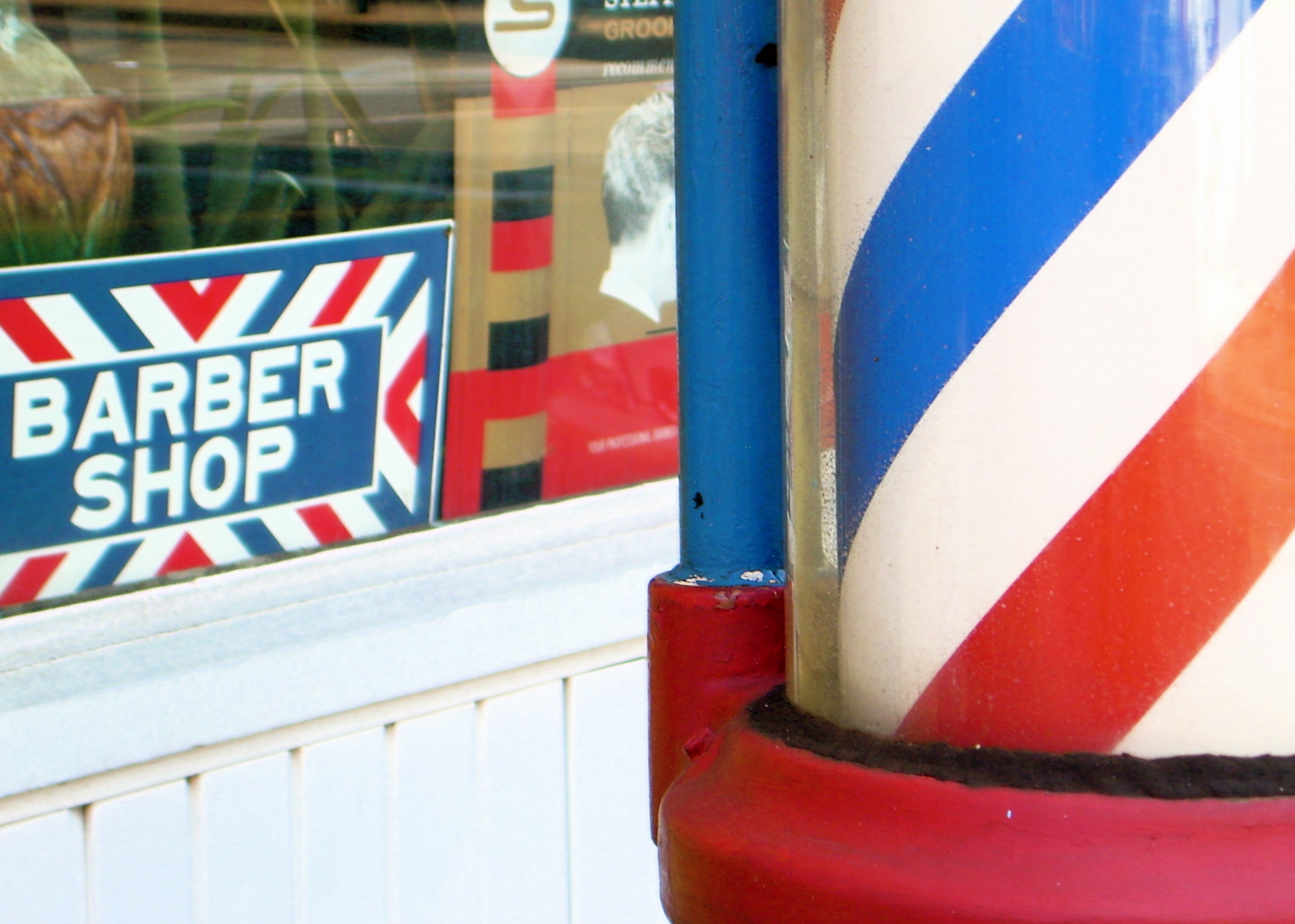
- Court: Court of Appeal of England and Wales
- Full case name: Terence Eardley East & Janet Daisy Maud East v Roger Joseph Maurer & Roger de Paris & Company Ltd
- Decided: 28 September 1990
- Citation: [1990] EWCA Civ 6, [1991] 2 All ER 733, [1991] 1 WLR 461

Court membership
- Judges sitting: Lord Justice Mustill, Lord Justice Butler-Sloss, Lord Justice Beldam

Keywords
- Misrepresentation

East v Maurer [1990] EWCA Civ 6 is an English contract law case concerning misrepresentation.

== Facts ==
Maurer fraudulently told East he would not run a competing hair salon, so East bought the salon from Maurer. Maurer started to run a competing hair salon. East lost business. East then sued Maurer for deceit.

== Judgment ==
"The Court of Appeal held that East could recover the price paid minus selling price, plus trading losses, plus expenses of buying and selling and carrying out improvements, plus £10,000 in foregone profits. It noted that foregone profits were recoverable in tort where the claimant might be expected to make them in a similar hairdressing business. To recover profits that would have been particular to this business, breach of a contractual warranty needed to be shown."

== See also ==
- English contract law
- Misrepresentation in English law
- Smith New Court Ltd v Scrimgeour Vickers (Asset Management) Ltd [1997] AC 254, Lord Steyn said East ‘shows that an award based on the hypothetical profitable business in which the plaintiff would have engaged but for deceit is permissible: it is classic consequential loss.’
