= Legal remedy =

Court-enforced rights or penalties

A legal remedy, also referred to as judicial relief or a judicial remedy, is the means with which a court of law, usually in the exercise of civil law jurisdiction, enforces a right, imposes a penalty, or makes another court order to impose its will in order to compensate for the harm of a wrongful act inflicted upon an individual.

In common law jurisdictions and mixed civil-common law jurisdictions, the law of remedies distinguishes between a legal remedy (e.g. a specific amount of monetary damages) and an equitable remedy (e.g. injunctive relief or specific performance). Another type of remedy available in these systems is declaratory relief, where a court determines the rights of the parties to action without awarding damages or ordering equitable relief. The type of legal remedies to be applied in specific cases depend on the nature of the wrongful act and its liability. In international human rights law, there is a right to an effective remedy.

In the legal system of the United States, there exists a traditional form of judicial remedies that serve to combat juror biases caused by news coverage. The First Amendment of the United States forbids the government from censoring and restraining the freedom of expression, which allows the ever-expanding news media to influence the legal process. The entangled relationship between mass media and the legal system presents challenges to the Sixth Amendment that guarantees the rights of criminal defendants to receive fair trials. Trial-level remedies are in place to avoid pretrial publicity from affecting the fairness of a trial. To minimize the impacts of pretrial publicity, there are six kinds of judicial remedies at the disposal of judges: voir dire, change of venue, change of veniremen, continuance, admonition, sequestration.

In English and American jurisprudence, there is a legal maxim (albeit one sometimes honored in the breach) that for every right, there is a remedy; where there is no remedy, there is no right. That is, lawmakers claim to provide appropriate remedies to protect rights. This legal maxim was first enunciated by William Blackstone: "It is a settled and invariable principle in the laws of England, that every right when with-held must have a remedy, and every injury its proper redress." In addition to the United Kingdom and the United States, legal remedy is a concept widely practiced in the legal system of a variety of countries, though approached differently.

== Three types of legal remedy in common law systems ==
There are three crucial categories of judicial remedies in common law systems. The legal remedy originates from the law courts of England and is seen in the form of a payment of money to the victim, commonly referred to as damages or replevin. Damages aim at making up the harm that a breaching party has committed to the victim. In the history of the English legal system, the legal remedy only existed in the form of monetary relief, and therefore the victim must petition through a separate system if the victim wanted other forms of compensation. Although the courtrooms and proceedings have been integrated, the distinction between requests for money versus action is still present. Non-monetary compensation refers to the second category of judicial remedies—equitable remedies. This type of remedy comes from the equitable jurisdiction developed in the English Court of Chancery and Court of Exchequer. Declaratory remedies make up the third category of judicial remedies. Different from the other two categories, declaratory remedies usually involve a court's determination of how the law applies to particular facts without any command to the parties. Courts give declaratory remedies about many different kinds of questions, including whether a person has a legal status, who the owner of a property is, whether a statute has a particular meaning, or what the rights are under a contract. While these are three basic categories of remedies in common law, there are also a handful of others (such as reformation and rescission, both dealing with contracts whose terms need to be rewritten or undone).

=== Legal remedies (damages) ===
- Compensatory damages

Compensatory damages are paid directly to the claimant to compensate for loss and injury when the defendant is proven to be liable for breach of duty or committing wrongful acts. In cases where the claimant has suffered ascertainable costs, it is easy to determine the amount of compensatory damages. In other cases where the liability results from the defendant failing to perform a service, it is necessary to calculate compensatory damages by inquiring how much it would cost for a third party to provide the same service. However, the court takes into account when the non-breaching party makes savings or profits because he or she is involuntarily relieved from the responsibilities specified in a broken contract. If the non-breaching party makes gains from alternative arrangements, compensatory damages are equivalent to his or her loss subtracted by the gains made from the substitution.

- Consequential damages

Consequential damages, also known as special damages, are intended to compensate for the indirect consequences incurred by the defendant and are sanctioned on a case-by-case basis due to their specificity. Lost profits make up a common type of consequential damages in contract laws. When the party breaching a contract causes the plaintiff to lose profits, the money is recoverable if the plaintiff can prove its ascertainment and trace it to the wrongful conduct of the breaching party, which can be extremely difficult. Moreover, legal expenses including the ones generated by bringing a lawsuit against the breaching party to attain legal remedies do not count toward consequential damages and be charged from the defendant, unless stated in the contract otherwise.

- Punitive damages

Punitive damages are different from other types of damages because their main purpose is to punish the defendant and deter him or her and many others from engaging in similar kinds of unlawful conduct in the future. The maliciousness and willingness of the defendant to carry out certain wrongful acts are typically what compel the court to impose punitive damages. Since the intention of punitive damages is typically not to compensate the plaintiff, it is often that only a part of it would be awarded to the plaintiff at the discretion of judges and that they serve only as complements to compensatory damages.

- Incidental damages

Incidental damages, closely associated with compensatory damages, are costs used to prevent further losses that result from the breach of contract on behalf of the nonbreaching party. For example, a company breaches a hiring contract that it signed with a prospective employee. The expenditures that the employee spent searching for another job are an element of incidental damages.

- Nominal damages

The plaintiff is entitled to receive nominal damages in cases in which there is no actual harm or the plaintiff is unable to prove harm. Although the amount of nominal damages is typically small, the plaintiff can use the award of nominal damages as a justification to plead for punitive awards or appeal a violation of his or her rights that form the basis of the lawsuit, common in cases involving constitutional rights.

- Liquidated damages

Liquidated damages refer to a predetermined amount of money that must be paid by the breaching party, and they are fixed numbers agreed upon by both parties during the formation of a contract. Courts enforcing a liquidated damages provision would consider the reasonableness of its amount, specifically if it approximates the amount of actual damages caused, and the ascertain. Failing to meet this condition would turn liquidated damages into an unenforceable penalty that inequitably benefits the party receiving liquidated awards.

- Statutory damages

In certain cases, a statute dictates the amount of damages, rather than the calculation of the harm or loss endured by the plaintiff. The Fair Debt Collection Practices Act would charge up to $1,000 for every violation of its provision, which is an example of statutory damages. Treble damages is a type of statutory damages in which the amount of compensatory damages awarded to a plaintiff can be tripled given the warranty of a statute.

=== Equitable remedies ===
There are three characteristics of equitable remedies that differ from damages. First, the jury is not used in cases involving equitable remedies. Second, in sanctioning equitable remedies, the court does not make decisions based on precedents but tends to rely on the justice that needs to be served. Third, equitable remedies are not monetary. Rather, they include actions, properties, etc., that the court orders the defendant to perform in order to bring both parties in a lawsuit back to the position in which they were prior to their contract.

- Injunction

Injunction is a court order that coerces the defendant to take specific acts or refrains him or her from engaging in certain actions, e.g., breaching a contract. In the U.S., injunction is the most common type of equitable remedies, and failure to comply with an injunction can lead to results ranging from fines to imprisonment.

- Accounting for profits

Accounting for profits is an inquiry into the amount of gains that the defendant benefited from his or her wrongs. Accounting is more commonly practiced in cases against a fiduciary or breach of contract in which the ascertainment of the defendant's profits is important.

- Constructive trust

Constructive trust is enforced in situations where the possession of a property by the defendant unjustly enriches him or her, and therefore the court decides to grant the ownership of the property to the plaintiff.

- Equitable lien

Equitable lien is applicable when the defendant used unjust funds obtained from the plaintiff to make improvements to his or her property. By granting the plaintiff a security interest in the property of the defendant, it guards the right of the plaintiff to have the funds returned from the defendant.

- Subrogation

In a subrogation case, the property that belongs to the plaintiff from a legal standpoint is used by the defendant to repay the debt to a third party. Subrogation entitles the plaintiff to the rights as the third party against the defendant.

- Specific performance

Specific performance refers to the court compelling the defendant to perform certain actions. This type of equitable remedy is limited in scope because in contract laws for example, issuing specific performance would require the property that gives rise to the lawsuit to be unique, or that it is more practical for the defendant to compensate the plaintiff by paying for compensatory damages.

- Reformation

Reformation, or referred to as rectification, is when the court practices remedies by correcting the writings of a contract. Under two circumstances, reformation applies either when (1) the writing does not reflect the agreement made between the parties, or (2) one party signed the contract in the first place because of manipulation by fraud planned and executed by the other party.

- Equitable rescission

Equitable rescission gives the innocent plaintiff the right to undo or rescind a contract when the plaintiff entered the contract as a result of fraud, misrepresentation, etc., or when the contract has been breached by the other party. To restore the situation to what it was before the contract, both parties need to return what they have received from the exchange.

=== Declaratory remedies ===
Declaratory remedies, or declaratory judgment, do not belong to the category of damages or equities. They are legal determinations made by the court to address ambiguity or disputes without sanctioning an action or practice against the parties involved. Declaratory remedies serve to affirm the validity of the claims and requests made by the plaintiff, accompanied by injunction in selective cases at the discretion of judges or juries. Declaratory remedies are a component of preventive adjudication because in cases that demand only declaration, no actual harm or loss has been incurred by the plaintiff.

== Trial-level remedies for pretrial publicity ==
Pretrial publicity can lessen the effectiveness of jurors in ways such as presenting incriminating information or arousing blind emotions, which significantly influence the outcome of trials and damage their fairness. As technologies develop, the prevalence of mass media makes legal information more accessible and thus poses a larger threat to the process of adjudication. Trial-level remedies are designed for judges to mitigate the impact of pretrial publicity without infringing the freedom of expression for the press.

=== Voir dire ===
Voir dire, which means "tell the truth" in French, refers (only in the US) to a process in which attorneys and judges conduct interviews with potential jurors to discover their bias and rule out the ones who cannot be impartial. The selection procedure usually starts with a written questionnaire before questioning. In the process of questioning, both parties have the right to excuse potential jurors through challenges for cause. An attorney must convince the court with legitimate reasons to eliminate a potential juror. Another method to screen out a member from a pool of jurors is to use peremptory challenges, which cannot be rejected by the judge. However, attorneys can only use peremptory challenges for a limited number of times.

=== Change of venue ===
Change of venue is to relocate the trial to another area in the same state that has presumably received less exposure of information regarding the case.

=== Change of veniremen ===
Instead of moving the location of the trial, the court can also import jurors from a distant community, where less coverage has been given to the case.

Venir is a French word meaning "to come."

=== Continuance ===
Continuance is to postpone the trial on the grounds that the prejudice of jurors would reduce as they forget much information about the case from media. The delay also results in the defendant spending additional time in jail or that it may attract more media attention and drive up the publicity of the case.

=== Admonition ===
Admonition utilizes the effectiveness of the instructions of the judge to the jurors and the jurors' obedience. By giving a panel of jurors instructions such as make verdicts solely based on the evidence presented in the court, the judge seeks to diminish the influence of mass media.

=== Sequestration ===
For high-profile cases, the jurors are isolated until the case is closed. They would be housed in together while their access of all forms of media and technologies is either screen or restrained.

== Case-by-case versus announced ==
Remedies can be, and in American law usually are, determined case by case, and take into account many different facts including the amount of harm caused to the victim. Remedies can also be determined in advance for an entire class of cases. For example, there can be a fixed fine for all violations of a legal rule, regardless of how much harm was caused in a particular case.

== Application of legal remedy in different jurisdictions ==
Monetary compensatory damages, along with injunction, are most commonly used in the United States. Similar to the U.S., the courts in the United Kingdom tend to award monetary compensatory damages in tort cases. However, punitive damages are not applicable in the legal systems of the U.K. and Japan or the contractual cases in Australia and occupy a limited but expanding scope in the People's Republic of China. In European states, the type of remedies, including the character and amount of damages, are determined on a case-by-case basis through factors such as the location where the illegal conduct caused damages. The enforcement of legal remedies can be difficult in international litigations as the law in one jurisdiction does not apply to another.

== Right to an effective remedy ==
The right to an effective remedy is the right of a person whose human rights have been violated to legal remedy. Such a remedy must be accessible, binding, capable of bringing perpetrators to justice, provide appropriate reparations, and prevent further violations of the person's rights. The right to an effective remedy guarantees the individual the ability to seek remedy from the state directly rather than through an international process. It is a practical means of protecting human rights on the state level and requires the state to not just only protect human rights de jure but also in practice for individual cases. The right to an effective remedy is commonly recognized as a human right in international human rights instruments.

The right to an effective remedy is expressed in Article 8 of the Universal Declaration of Human Rights, Article 2 of the International Covenant on Civil and Political Rights, Article 13 of the European Convention on Human Rights, and Article 47 of the European Union Charter on Fundamental Rights.

== See also ==
=== Examples ===
Damages or legal remedies, which may include:

- Compensatory damages
- General damages
- Special damages
- Consequential damages
- Incidental damages
- Expectation damages
- Reliance damages
- Punitive damages
- Nominal damages
- Liquidated damages
- Statutory damages
- Treble damages
- Award of attorney's fees

Equitable remedies, which may include:

- Injunction
- Accounting for profits
- Constructive trust
- Equitable lien
- Subrogation
- Specific performance
- Reformation/rectification
- Equitable rescission
- Restitution

Declaratory remedies

=== Categories ===
- Adequate remedy
- Civil remedy
- Cumulative remedy
- Civil and political rights
- Election of remedies
- Equity
- Equitable remedy
- Extraordinary remedy
- Habeas corpus
- Joinder of remedies
- Provisional remedy
- Remedy over
