= Measure of damages under English law =

Damages for breach of contract is a common law remedy, available as of right. It is designed to compensate the victim for their actual loss as a result of the wrongdoer’s breach rather than to punish the wrongdoer. If no loss has been occasioned by the plaintiff, only nominal damages will be awarded.

A victim will not necessarily recover every loss which flows from the breach by the defendant. In order to recover any damages, the losses suffered by the victim must be caused by the defendant, and not be too remote. Further, the plaintiff has a duty to mitigate his losses.

== Amount of damages ==
The amount of damages a plaintiff would recover is usually measured on a "loss of bargain" basis, also known as expectation loss. In a commercial context this means the profits which would have been earned after deduction of costs which would have been incurred. Loss of bargain replaces expected value "so far as money can do it", a phrase adopted in the case of Robinson v Harman (1848).

== Duty to mitigate ==
A plaintiff has a duty to mitigate damages and can not recover losses it could have avoided through reasonable efforts.

== Bases of assessment ==
There are three bases of assessment:

- Expectation interest/loss of bargain. Expectation damages include:
  1. Benefit of bargain
  2. Lost profit
  3. Cost of cure
- Reliance interest - interest created based on reliance on contract or promise.
- Restitutionary interest

For award of damages for loss under a building contract, "the prima facie rule is cost of cure, which means the cost of remedying the defect.

== Damages exceeding loss: extra-compensatory awards ==
Extra-compensatory damages in the form of nominal damages are the most venerable type of extra-compensatory damages, long established in our common law jurisprudence. Nominal damages are awarded where a legal wrong has been committed but no consequential loss has been caused. The purpose of the award is vindicatory – to mark the existence of the right in question and to mark the fact of its violation by the wrongdoer.

== Special classes of damages ==
Other than pecuniary damages, which is the most common type of damages recovered, there are a few other recognizable types of damages under English law, and still others that have their validity subject to ongoing debate:

- Injured feelings and disappointment
- Injured reputation
- Speculative damages
- Liquidated damages and penalty
- Quantum meruit
- Exemplary or punitive damages
- Vindicatory damages

== See also ==
- Damages
