= Peevyhouse v. Garland Coal & Mining Co. =

1962 Oklahoma Supreme Court case

- Court: Supreme Court of Oklahoma
- Full case name: Willie PEEVYHOUSE and Lucille Peevyhouse, Plaintiffs in Error, v. GARLAND COAL & MINING COMPANY, Defendant in Error.
- Decided: December 11, 1962
- Citation: 382 P.2d 109 (Okla. 1962)

Court membership
- Judges sitting: Jackson, Halley, Welch, Davison, Johnson, Blackbird, Williams, Irwin, and Berry

Peevyhouse v. Garland Coal & Mining Co., 382 P.2d 109 (Okla. 1962), is a US contract law case decided by the Supreme Court of Oklahoma. It concerns the question of when specific performance of a contractual obligation will be granted and the measure of expectation damages.

== Facts ==
Willie and Lucille Peevyhouse owned a farm containing coal deposits. In November 1954, they entered into a contract with Garland Coal & Mining Co. They gave Garland a five-year lease to strip mine the coal, in return for a royalty, and the promise that the land would be restored once they were done. In the lease agreement was the following:

7d Lessee agrees to leave the creek crossing the above premises in such a condition that it will not interfere with the crossings to be made in pits as set out in 7b.

7f Lessee further agrees to leave no shale or dirt on the high wall of said pits.

Coal mining can often work through digging out underground shafts, but stripping off the land was cheaper. To restore the land the overburden must be shifted back, in this case at a cost of $29,000. When there were recurrent floods, Garland refused to put the land back. The Peevyhouses sued. The jury returned a verdict for the Peevyhouses for $5,000 and Garland appealed again.

== Judgment ==
The Supreme Court of Oklahoma found that, while the coal company breached its contract with the Peevyhouses, Garland did not have to fix the property nor pay for the work necessary to restore the land, but instead could just pay the Peevyhouses for the difference in land value. The land, while destroyed, had only lost $300 in value. The court found that to pay the Peevyhouses to restore their land would be an economic waste, since the $25,000 in labor would result only in a $300 improvement of the land. Justice Jackson gave the leading judgment.

In the trial court, plaintiffs Willie and Lucille Peevyhouse sued the defendant, Garland Coal and Mining Company, for damages for breach of contract. Judgment was for plaintiffs in an amount considerably less than was sued for. Plaintiffs appeal and defendant cross-appeals …

Briefly stated, the facts are as follows: plaintiffs owned a farm containing coal deposits, and in November 1954, leased the premises to defendant for a period of five years for coal mining purposes. A "strip-mining" operation was contemplated in which the coal would be taken from pits on the surface of the ground, instead of from underground mine shafts. In addition to the usual covenants found in a coal mining lease, defendant specifically agreed to perform certain restorative and remedial work at the end of the lease period. It is unnecessary to set out the details of the work to be done, other than to say that it would involve the moving of many thousands of cubic yards of dirt, at a cost estimated by expert witnesses at about $29,000.00. However, plaintiffs sued for only $25,000.00.

During the trial, it was stipulated that all covenants and agreements in the lease contract had been fully carried out by both parties, except the remedial work mentioned above; defendant conceded that this work had not been done.

Plaintiffs introduced expert testimony as to the amount and nature of the work to be done. Over plaintiffs' objections, defendant thereafter introduced expert testimony as to the "diminution in value" of plaintiffs' farm resulting from the failure of defendant to render performance as agreed in the contract—that is, the difference between the present value of the farm, and what its value would have been if defendant had done what it agreed to…

[The jury] returned a verdict for plaintiffs for $5,000.00. Only a fraction of the "cost of performance," but more than the total value of the farm even after the remedial work is done.

On appeal, the issue is sharply drawn. Plaintiffs contend that the true measure of damages in this case is what it will cost plaintiffs to obtain performance of the work that was not done because of defendant's default. Defendant argues that the measure of damages is the cost of performance "limited, however, to the total difference in the market value before and after the work was performed."…

[If the remedial work were done said Justice Jackson, Peevyhouse's farm's market value increase only $300.]

We therefore hold that where, in a coal mining lease, lessee agrees to perform certain remedial work on the premises concerned at the end of the lease period, and thereafter the contract is fully performed by both parties except that the remedial work is not done, the measure of damages in an action by lessor against lessee for damages for breach of contract is ordinarily the reasonable cost of performance of the work; however, where the contract provision breached was merely incidental to the main purpose in view, and where the economic benefit which would result to lessor by full performance of the work is grossly disproportionate to the cost of performance, the damages which lessor may recover are limited to the diminution in value resulting to the premises because of the non-performance.

Under the most liberal view of the evidence herein, the diminution in value resulting to the premises because of non-performance of the remedial work was $300.00… It thus appears that the judgment was clearly excessive, and that the amount for which judgment should have been rendered is definitely and satisfactorily shown by the record.

Justices Welch, Davison, Halley and Johnson concurred. Chief Justice Williams, Blackbird VCJ, Berry J and Irwin J dissented. Justice Irwin's dissent went as follows.

… Although the contract speaks for itself, there were several negotiations between the plaintiffs and defendant before the contract was executed. Defendant admitted in the trial of the action, that plaintiffs insisted the [remedial work provisions] be included in the contract and that they would not agree to the coal mining lease unless [those] provisions were included.

The cost for performing the contract in question could have been reasonably approximated when the contract was negotiated and executed, and there are no conditions now existing which could not have been reasonably anticipated by the parties. Therefore, defendant had knowledge, when it prevailed upon the plaintiffs to execute the lease, that the cost of performance might be disproportionate to the value or benefits received by plaintiff for the performance…

In the instant action defendant has made no attempt to even substantially perform. The contract in question is not immoral, is not tainted with fraud, and was not entered into through mistake or accident and is not contrary to public policy. It is clear and unambiguous and the parties understood the terms thereof, and the approximate cost of fulfilling the obligations could have been approximately ascertained. There are no conditions existing now which could not have been reasonably anticipated when the contract was negotiated and executed. The defendant could have performed the contract if it desired. It has accepted and reaped the benefits of its contract and now urges that plaintiffs under the contract be denied [their benefits from performance] …

Therefore, in my opinion, the plaintiffs were entitled to specific performance of the contract and since defendant has failed to perform, the proper measure of damages should be the cost of performance.

== Addendum ==
According to Swan, Reiter and Bala, "Two of the judges who sided with the majority in Peevyhouse were later involved in a serious bribery scandal. There is some suggestion that counsel for Garland Coal could have improperly influenced some of the judges in other cases, but there is no suggestion that a bribe affected the outcome in Peevyhouse, a case of relatively little financial consequence to Garland Coal."

== Controversy ==
The United States Court of Appeals for the Tenth Circuit determined in Rock Island Improvement Co. v. Helmerich & Payne, Inc., 698 F.2d 1075 (10th Cir. 1984) that the Oklahoma Supreme Court relied on an Oklahoma statute providing that "no person can recover a greater amount in damages for a breach of an obligation than he would have gained by the full performance thereof on both sides," and that this rule was subsequently restricted by the Open Cut Land Reclamation Act of 1967, declaring it the policy of Oklahoma "to provide, after mining operations are completed, for the reclamation and conservation of land subjected to surface disturbance by open cut mining." Therefore, reasoned the Tenth Circuit, "We are convinced that the Oklahoma Supreme Court would no longer apply the rule it established in Peevyhouse in 1963."

Relying on Rock Island, the United States District Court for the Western District of Oklahoma in Davis v. Shell Oil Co. (795 F.Supp. 381) asserted as fact that "courts in Oklahoma do not follow Peevyhouse." However, in a rebuke to both Federal Courts, the Oklahoma Supreme Court sharply reasserted the Peevyhouse rule in Schneberger v. Apache Corp., 890 P.2d 847 (Okla. 1994), declaring "[w]hatever the rationale, the essence of the Peevyhouse holding--to award diminution in value rather, than cost of performance, has been consistently adhered to... and it still represents the majority view."

== See also ==
- US contract law
- Cutter v Powell
- Robinson v Harman (1848) 18 LJ Ex 202
