= Adequate remedy =

Part of a legal remedy deemed satisfactory by the court

Legal Remedy

Federal Rules of Civil Procedures
- Long title: Courts will not grant equitable remedy, it refers to the sufficient compensation for the loss caused by the defendant to the plaintiff with the right amount of monetary award.
- Territorial extent: United States
- Enacted by: Federal Rules of Civil Procedures
- Commenced: 1938
- Introduced by: judiciary ACT of 1789
- Status: Unknown

An adequate remedy or adequate remedy at law is part of a legal remedy (either court-ordered or negotiated between the litigants) which the court deems satisfactory, without recourse to an equitable remedy. This consideration expresses to the court whether money should be awarded or a court order should be decreed. "Adequate remedy at law" refers to the sufficient compensation for the loss or damages caused by the defendant with a proper monetary award. The court must grant the adequacy of remedy that will lead to a "meaningful hearing". Whether legal damages or equitable relief are requested depends largely on whether or not the remedy can be valued. Both elements, compensation and the meaningfulness of hearing, provide a proper way to have an adequate remedy. The word "meaningfulness" of hearing in the law process is the assumption that the defendant compensated must be meaningful for the injured party where the defendant made a fully covered compensation for all the losses. Hence, the hearing in which cannot give any right amount of compensation award or settlement is not "meaningful", and the unavailability of the compensation will lead to an inadequate remedy. The adequate remedy at law is the legal remedies by meaning it is satisfactory compensation by way of monetary damages without granting equitable remedies.

As an operation of law, an attorney often must present to the court whether there is an adequate remedy. This would be a basic principle of equity. When a monetary award is not an adequate or appropriate remedy, equity can order a "specific performance", an order of the court requiring a party to perform the obligations that he or she undertook to perform under the contract. The "specific performance" exists when there is an exchange under a contract that can not be found easily elsewhere or at all, such as antiques, parcels of land. Damages are often bifurcated or determined in a separate trial or as a part in parcel of different determination from whether a certain tort or contract has occurred.

== History ==
The phrase "Adequate Remedies" first appeared in the Judiciary Act of 1789. It was elaborated that "adequate remedy" is denied that relief of the equity must be owned by the law. Although there is a contradiction in the 1938 of Federal Rules of Civil Procedures, that the equity of law must include "adequate remedy" in rule 57, Declaratory Judgements. On this judgements, it refers that although there is a monetary damage to a case a court may also issue a declaratory of the judgement. In the early United States legal history, "Adequate Remedies" is associated with the distinction between courts of law and equity. "Adequate Remedies" refers to the legal remedy, and equitable remedies that apply to the administrative or state court remedies. The court was unable to grant any equitable remedies such as specific performance where there is a plain legal remedy such as monetary damages. "Adequate Remedies" continues to appear in the federal case between 1938 and 1946.

== Purpose of legal remedy ==
The remedy is defined as the remedy at law where the judicial remedy or legal remedy takes place in the court. It is the manner on which side is correct that is admitted wrongly by society. Therefore, it is crucial to protect the individual's right and categorised cases to ensure an adequate remedy. There are two main categories of remedies which are legal remedy and equitable remedy. The example for the classification of legal remedies is damage, one of the most found types of damages is the compensatory damages where it compensates directly to the injured party or the non-breaching party for the value of the loss. Nonetheless, it is essential to value or compensate the right amount to the injured party equivalent to the loss of their suffering. The second category is an equitable remedy where it exists for the specific performance, injunction and restitution.

=== Legal remedy ===
Legal remedies in law are referring to a judicial relief or judicial remedy or damages. The damages are the compensation that is paid by the breaching party to the non-breaching party. Mainly, the legal remedy is presented in the civil law of the jurisdiction that supports rights, giving a penalty and court order. The legal remedy is effective when the suffering party is economically more benefit if there exists a monetary damage or compensation consequence to perform although the objective of these remedies is not to punish the defendant or the breaching party. "Adequate Remedy" is legal remedies that suffice the defendant to pay the loss of the victim.

=== Equitable remedy ===
This equitable remedy is a presence when the courts ask the defendant or the suffering party to do something, such as breaching a contract or "injunctive relief. The equitable remedy can be a presence that if the defendant does not want any monetary damages for the case that they suffer; instead, they want equity that afford the relief. As a result, the breaching party should follow the court orders such as, stop doing something that they have been warned or exchange to such as actual property.

==== Specific performance ====
The first type of equitable remedy is specific performance, it refers to the remedy that is claimed by the creditor to the debtor. The creditor can claim specific performance and sue the debtor when the debtor is breaking the affirmative decision. Such as the creditor sues the delivery of the unique personal land and property or unique car and paintings. There exist some restrictions to this type of equitable remedy where it is a limited remedy that only exists if the breaching of a contract must be unique items.

==== Injunction ====
Secondly, injunction, this is a legal action of the court order to stop and forbidding someone from doing something illegal activities such as breaching a contract. The example of injunctions are waste, trespass to land, injury to industrial property and misuse of confidential of the information.

==== Restitution ====
This is a remedy that bringing back to the parties to the place where before the deal was created. This type of equitable remedy is a contradiction with monetary damages or compensation. Restitution defined as the return of the restoration of a condition or contract. For instance, returning a property to the non-breaching party, which was taken by the defendant. An Individual who breaks an agreement ought not to endure a discipline, and the non-breaching party should not unlawfully enrich.

== Type of damages ==
Damages refer to the monetary reward or the compensation to make up of the damages caused by the defendant. There are six classifications of damages which are compensatory, consequential, punitive, incidental, nominal and liquidated damages. The objectives to fulfil the remedies is to make the plaintiff or suffering party not to suffer, the law allows several damages or compensation to cover the losses by the injured party.

=== Compensatory damages ===
Compensatory damages are compensated directly to the injured party when the defendant is proven to refuse with the affirmative action. This type of damage is simple to calculate where it would cost as much as the loss of the injured party and in return giving back the exact service. Calculating for the compensation or the money of the loss for the non-breaching party is easy. Compensatory damages is a fixed amount of compensation. It can be calculated from the loss of the injured party by giving evidence of how much money is lost.

=== Consequential damages ===
Consequential damages are the special damage where the defendant causes to lose profit money indirectly. However, this is difficult to examined and trace the violation to the breaching party. The most common cause for this damage is the breaching of a contract that leads to profit lost.

=== Punitive damages ===
Punitive damages are different from the compensatory damages where the non-breaching party does not want to have compensation that is caused by the defendant. The injured party tends to punish the defendant in a different way in a similar charge. This damages can only exist only in the non-contract action. The punitive damages commonly occurred in the civil action in which there does not exist a criminal sanction. The jury or judge can make a decision to this damages that will impact more to a richer person that may pay more to encounter punitive damage since this damages are not hooked by the law.

=== Incidental damages ===
Incidental damages are the expenses reasonably incurred by a non-breaching party in order to avoid further consequential or direct damages that result from the breach of contract. For example, following the breach of a contract for employment, incidental damages could include the cost incurred by the former employee to find another job.

=== Nominal damages ===
In the nominal damages, the non-breaching party cannot give the evidence of loss but suffering from the injury. There is a lack of proof that the non-breaching is suffering from loss. One of the common examples of this damages is the personal injury claim, the non-breaching party or the plaintiff should provide the prove that and evidence of the physical injury suffered.

=== Liquidated damages ===
Damages are sometimes hard to assess; hence the non-breaching party determine the amount to pay for the breach. The example of this damage is when the plaintiff has a contract in purchasing defendant's house under their agreement, and the defendant must pay back the deposit money as liquidated damages since there exists a breach of a contract by the defendant. Then, the plaintiff sued the defendant, but the defendant also argues that there was an accident that caused the death of her husband.

== Example of adequate remedy ==
=== Case 1 ===
The case of the Adequate Remedy goes something like this. James has a house which he values at $30,000. John, who is attracted to buying the house, gives the value to it at $60,000 and offers to James $50,000. After bargaining several times, the price still stays at this price. James and John sign a contract that states that John can take over the ownership of the house in 30 days. Hence the sale price of the house is at $50,000 and leave James $20,000 of surplus and John $10,000 of surplus. One week after signing the contract, Jack came to James and offered to buy the house at a higher price at $80,000. James then breaches his contract with John. John then files a lawsuit and sues James for violating the agreement, and he requested James to compensate for his loss. John is expecting the monetary damages where John wants to have an adequate remedy in the court. If the Adequate remedy by the judge is under monetary damage, Jack ends up taking the ownership of the house, and James is forced to value and pay for John losses which is $10,000 for his surplus losses and essential restitution.

=== Case 2 ===
A neighbour building on a landowner's parcel would have little or no value that can be paid because land is unique, and an inadequate value could be ascertained; contrast this, for instance, with the neighbour borrowing the landowner's car and being 100% at fault for an accident. In the latter case, the valuation of the car plus other consequentially- caused damages can be reasonably valuated. Therefore, as a general rule, where the fair market value can readily be assessed, with certain carved exceptions, the remedy at law is damages (or money). Whereas, the "inadequacy" of a remedy at law leads a lawyer usually to seek equitable relief from the court.

== See also ==
- Right to an effective remedy
