= Richard Bolles =

Richard Bolles may refer to:

- Richard Nelson Bolles (1927–2017), Episcopal clergyman and author
- Richard "Dicky" J. Bolles (1843–1917), Florida land salesman
