= Restitutio ad integrum =

Latin term meaning "restoration to original condition"

Restitutio ad integrum, or restitutio in integrum, is a Latin term that means "restoration to original condition". It is one of the primary guiding principles behind the awarding of damages in common law negligence claims.

In European patent law, it also refers to a means of redress available to an applicant or patentee who has failed to meet a time limit despite exercising all due care.

In ancient Roman law, it was a specific method of praetor intervention in an otherwise valid legal action that was viewed as especially unjust or harmful.

== Common law negligence claims ==
Restitutio ad integrum is one of the primary guiding principles behind the awarding of damages in common law negligence claims. The general rule, as the principle implies, is that the amount of compensation awarded should put the successful plaintiff in the position that would have been the case if the tortious action had not been committed. Thus, the plaintiff should clearly be awarded damages for direct expenses such as medical bills and property repairs and the loss of future earnings attributable to the injury, which often involves difficult speculation on the future career and promotion prospects.

Although monetary compensation cannot be directly equated with physical deprivation, it is generally accepted that compensation should also be awarded for loss of amenities, which reflects the decrease in expected standard of living from any injury suffered and pain and suffering. Damages awards in those categories are justified by the restitutio principle as monetary compensation provides the most practicable way of redressing the deprivation caused by physical injury.

=== Cases ===
- Graham v. Egan 15 La. Ann. 97, 98 (1860). In considering whether to give the mortgagor money damages or restore the property itself, the court said in regard to restitution: "He can restore the property itself, and place the [mortgagor] in the same condition he would have occupied if he had not been harassed with an unfounded demand. This is precisely what is meant by the restitution in integrum. If there be ground for restitution at all, there is the same ground for a complete restitution, a restitution in integrum".
- Emile Erlanger v The New Sombrero Phosphate Company (1877–78) L.R. 3 App. Cas. 1218
- Livingstone v Rawyards Coal Co (1880) 5 App Cas 25,39, per Lord Blackburn, compensation should be "that sum of money which will put the party who has been injured in the same position as he would have been if he had not sustained the wrong for which he is now getting his compensation or reparation".

== Patent law ==
The expression restitutio in integrum is also used in patent law, namely in the European Patent Convention (EPC), and refers to a means of redress available to an applicant or patentee who has failed to meet a time limit in spite of exercising "all due care required by the circumstances". If the request for restitutio in integrum is accepted, the applicant or patentee is re-established in its rights, as if the time limit had been duly met.

According to decision G 1/86 of the Enlarged Board of Appeal of the European Patent Office, other parties such as opponents are not barred from the restitutio in integrum by principle. For instance, if an opponent fails to file the statement of grounds for appeal in spite of all due care, after having duly filed the notice of appeal, restitutio remedies are available to them.

== Ancient Roman law ==
Restitutio in integrum had a distinct meaning in ancient Roman law that differed from its common law counterpart. The core concept of reversing to original condition was preserved, but restitutio in integrum was a specific method of praetor intervention in an otherwise-valid legal action that was viewed as especially unjust or harmful. It was an extraordinary measure designed to protect from arbitrary application of law, which Romans viewed very unfavorably (expressed in the Latin maxim summum ius, summa iniuria "the greatest law is the greatest injury"). As such, it was an ultimum remedium ("ultimate remedy"), which was used only when all other avenues of protection from injustice were expanded. Examples of situations in which restitutio in integrum might have been employed were harmful legal actions undertaken by those below 25 years of age because of their inexperience and legal actions undertaken with erroneous assumptions (error) or in fear (metus) of another's threat (vis).
