= Robinson v Harman =

Remedies for breach of contract

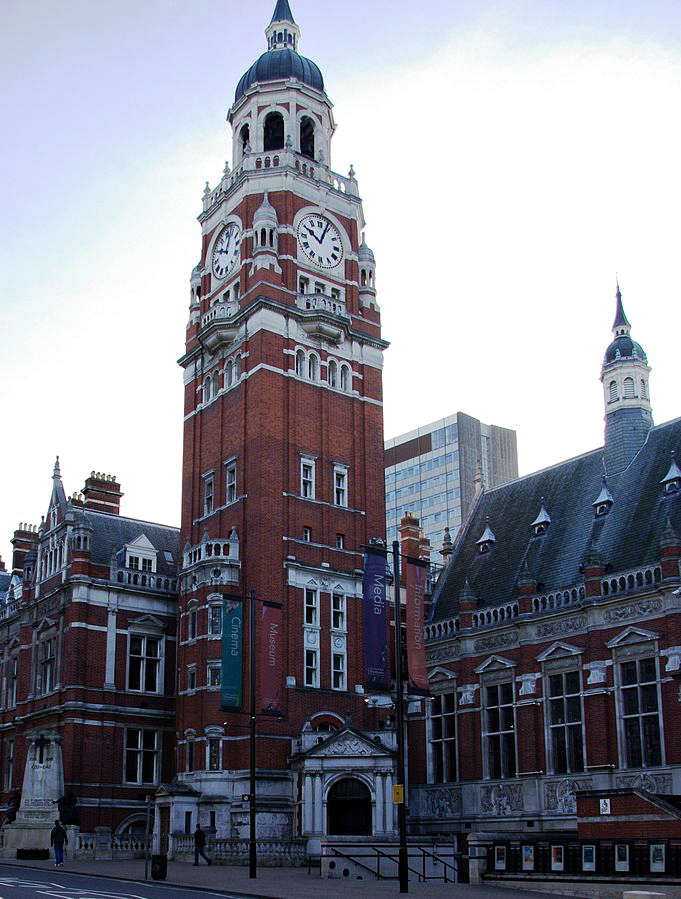
- Court: Court of Exchequer Chamber
- Decided: 18 January 1848
- Citation: (1848) 1 Ex Rep 850, 154 ER 363

Court membership
- Judges sitting: Parke B, Alderson B and Platt B

Keywords
- Expectation damages

Robinson v Harman (1848) 1 Ex Rep 850 is an English contract law case, which is best known for a classic formulation by the judge, James Parke (at 855) on the purpose and measure of compensatory damages for breach of contract that,

the rule of the common law is, that where a party sustains loss by reason of a breach of contract, he is, so far as money can do it to be placed in the same situation, with respect to damages, as if the contract had been performed.

== Facts ==
Mr Harman wrote a letter, dated 15 April 1846, agreeing to grant Mr Robinson a lease on a house in High Street, Croydon, for 21 years, starting on 29 September that year, at £110 per year. The exact wording was "to grant and deliver to the plaintiff a good and valid lease of a certain dwelling-house, &c., and other hereditaments and premises in the agreement mentioned, for a term of twenty-one years from the 29th day of September then next ensuing, at the yearly rent of £110". Then Mr Harman changed his mind and refused to complete the lease. It turned out the house was worth much more than £110 a year. Mr Harman had inherited the property from his recently deceased father. Although Mr Robinson's solicitor (whose fee was £15 12s 8d) had enquired whether the will may have vested the property in trustees, Mr Harman had said there was nothing of the sort, that it was his property out and out, and that he alone had the power of leasing. In fact trustees held the property and Mr Harman had been entitled to only a moiety of the rent during his life. As a result of this breach of contract Mr Robinson, according to the plea,

"lost and was deprived of great gains and profits, which would otherwise have accrued to him, and paid, expended, and incurred liability to pay divers sums of money, in and about the preparation of the said agreement and lease, etc, amounting, to wit, to £20.”

Lord Denman CJ heard the trial at the Surrey Spring Assizes. Mr Harman urged that the plaintiff could not recover damages for the loss of his bargain. Evidence was tendered on his behalf that Mr Robinson, when he entered into the agreement, had full knowledge of the defendant's incapacity to grant the lease; but the judge ruled that such evidence was inadmissible. The judge found that Mr Robinson was entitled to £200 (including court expenses) to cover his loss from not getting the house. Mr Harman appealed.

== Judgment ==
At appeal, the Court of Exchequer Chamber held that where a party agrees to grant a good and valid lease, having full knowledge that he has no title, the plaintiff, in an action for the breach of such agreement, may recover, beyond his expenses, damages resulting from the loss of his bargain; and the defendant cannot, under a plea of payment of money into court, give evidence that the plaintiff was aware of the defect of title. Parke B's judgment went as follows.

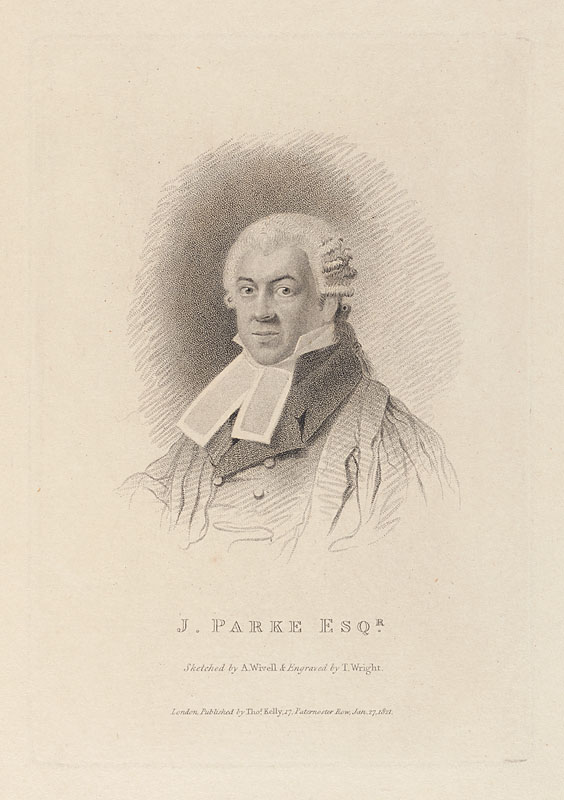
James Parke

The rule must be discharged. The defendant contracted to grant a good and valid lease, and the learned judge was right in rejecting evidence which would go to alter the contract admitted by the plea.

The next question is, what damages is the plaintiff entitled to recover? The rule of the common law is, that where a party sustains a loss by reason of a breach of contract, he is, so far as money can do it, to be placed in the same situation, with respect to damages, as if the contract had been performed. The case of Flureau v Thornhill qualified that rule of the common law. It was there held, that contracts for the sale of real estate are merely on condition that the vendor has a good title; so that, when a person contracts to sell real property, there is an implied understanding that, if he fail to make a good title, the only damages recoverable are the expenses which the vendee may be put to in investigating the title. The present case comes within the rule of the common law, and I am unable to distinguish it from Hopkins v Grazebrook.

Alderson B said,

I am of the same opinion. The damages have been assessed according to the general rule of law, that where a person makes a contract and breaks it, he must pay the whole damage sustained. Upon that general rule an exception was engrafted by the case of Flureau v Thornhill, and upon that exception the case of Hopkins v Grazebrook engrafted another exception. This case comes within the latter, by which the old common-law rule has been restored. Therefore the defendant, having undertaken to grant a valid lease, not having any colour of title, must pay the loss which the plaintiff has sustained by not having that for which he contracted.

Thomas Joshua Platt, Baron of the Exchequer, added,

Upon general principle, I cannot distinguish this case from Hopkins v Grazebrook.

== See also ==
- Farley v Skinner
