= Erlanger v New Sombrero Phosphate Co =

1878 UK company law case

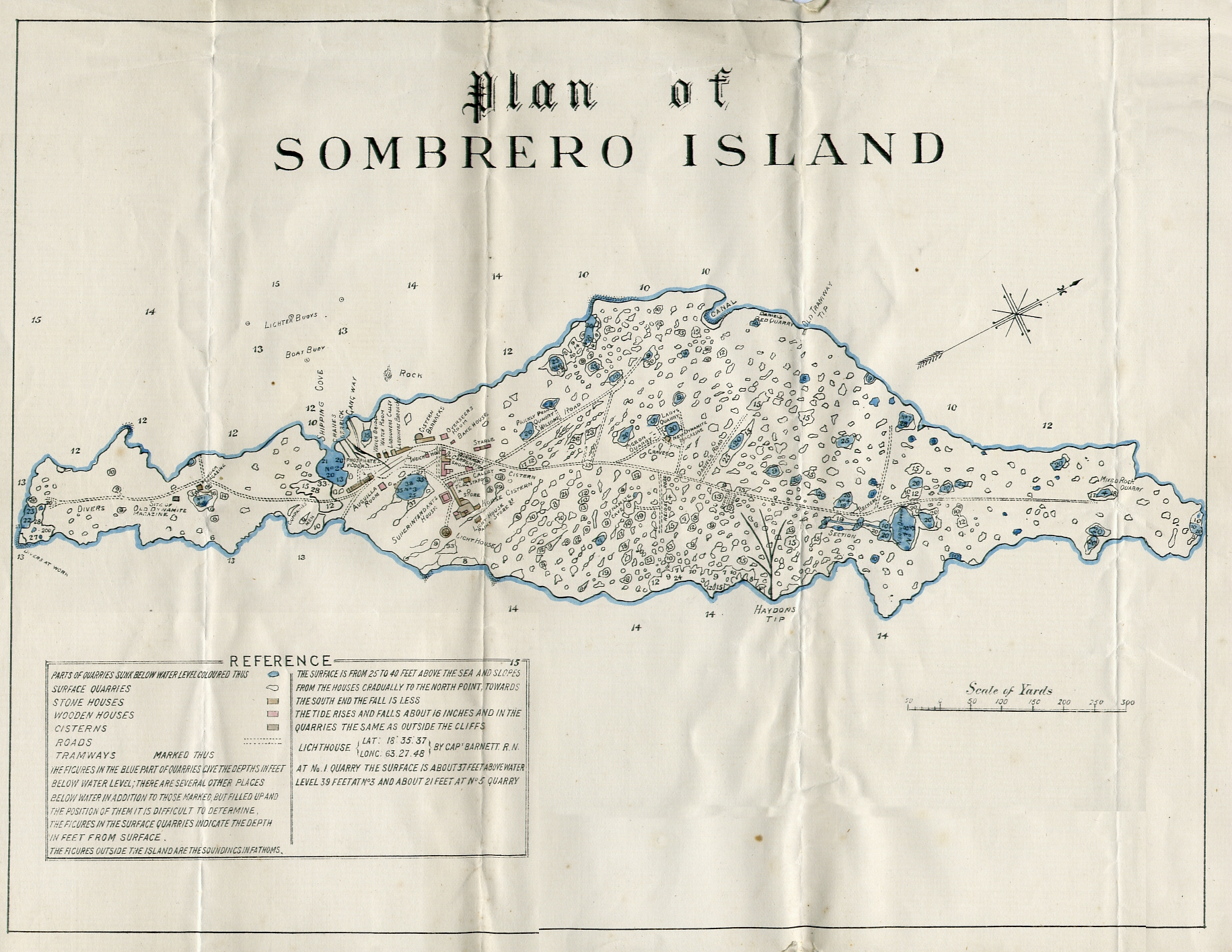
- Court: House of Lords
- Citation: (1878) 3 App Cas 1218, 48 LJ Ch 73, 27 WR 65, [1874-80] All ER Rep 271, 39 LT 269

Court membership
- Judges sitting: Lord Blackburn, Lord Penzance, Lord Cairns LC, Lord Hatherley, Lord O'Hagan, Lord Selborne and Lord Gordon

Erlanger v New Sombrero Phosphate Co (1878) 3 App Cas 1218 is a landmark English contract law, restitution and UK company law case. It concerned rescission for misrepresentation and how the impossibility of counter restitution may be a bar to rescission. It is also an important illustration of how promoters of a company stand in a fiduciary relationship to subscribers.

== Facts ==
Frédéric Émile d'Erlanger was a Parisian banker. He bought the lease of the Anguilla island of Sombrero for phosphate mining for £55,000. He then set up the New Sombrero Phosphate Co. Eight days after incorporation, he sold the island to the company for £110,000 through a nominee. One of the directors was the Lord Mayor of London, who himself was independent of the syndicate that formed the company. Two other directors were abroad, and the others were mere puppet directors of Erlanger. The board, which was effectively Erlanger, ratified the sale of the lease. Erlanger, through promotion and advertising, got many members of the public to invest in the company.

After eight months, the public investors found out the fact that Erlanger (and his syndicate) had bought the island at half the price the company (now with their money) had paid for it. The New Sombrero Phosphate Co sued for rescission based on non-disclosure, if they gave back the mine and an account of profits, or for the difference.

== Judgment ==
The House of Lords unanimously held that promoters of a company stand in a fiduciary relationship to investors, meaning they have a duty of disclosure. Further, they held, by majority (Lord Cairns LC dissenting), that the contract could be rescinded, and that rescission was not barred by laches.

Lord Blackburn decided that delay did not bar rescission. As a general "condition to a rescission there must be a restitutio in integrum." There was a question over this, since phosphate had been mined, and it was not so easy to put the phosphate back. He observed it would "be obviously unjust that a person who has been in possession of property under the contract which he seeks to repudiate should be allowed to throw that back on the other party’s hands without accounting for any benefit he may have derived from the use of the property… [or] making compensation for that deterioration." In this case, however, adequate compensate could be paid. So there was no impossibility in counter restitution. His judgment ran as follows.

Throughout the Companies Act, 1862 (25 & 26 Vict. c. 89), the word “promoters” is not anywhere used. It is, however, a short and convenient way of designating those who set in motion the machinery by which the Act enables them to create an incorporated company.

Neither does this Act in terms impose any duty on those promoters to have regard to the interests of the company which they are thus empowered to create. But it gives them an almost unlimited power to make the corporation subject to such regulations as they please, and for such purposes as they please, and to create it with a managing body whom they select, having powers such as they choose to give to those managers, so that the promoters can create such a corporation that the corporation, as soon as it comes into being, may be bound by anything, not in itself illegal, which those promoters have chosen. And I think those who accept and use such extensive powers, which so greatly affect the interests of the corporation when it comes into being, are not entitled to disregard the interests of that corporation altogether. They must make a reasonable use of the powers which they accept from the Legislature with regard to the formation of the corporation, and that requires them to pay some regard to its interests. And consequently they do stand with regard to that corporation when formed, in what is commonly called a fiduciary relation to some extent. Some reference was made in the argument to the Companies Act 1867 (30 & 31 Vict. c. 131, s. 38), on the construction of which there has been a great diversity of judicial opinion. That section does contain the word “promoters,” which, as I have already observed, is not to be found in the Companies Act 1862, but it imposes no fresh duty on them with regard to the company. It imposes a fresh duty towards, and gives a new cause of action to, persons who take shares in the company as individuals; it does not affect the obligation of the promoters towards the corporation. I think that the extent of that fiduciary relation, which, as already said, in my opinion, the promoters bear to the company, is a very important consideration in construing that section; and I am desirous to avoid prejudging that question by saying in this case more than is necessary for its decision. I think, as already said, that the promoters are in a situation of confidence to some extent towards the company they form.

Where, as in the present case, the company is formed for the purpose of becoming purchasers from the promoters as vendors, the interests of the promoters and of the company clash. It is the vendor's interest to get as high a price as possible, and they have a strong bias to overvalue the property which they are selling; it is the purchasers' interest to give as low a price as possible, and to secure that the price actually given is not more than the property is really worth to them.

Lord Eldon, in Gibson v Jeyes, says that “it is a great rule of the Court that he who bargains in matters of advantage with a person placing confidence in him, is bound to shew that a reasonable use has been made of that confidence—a rule applying to trustees, attorneys, or any one else.” I think persons having property to sell may form a company for the purpose of buying it in such a manner as to shew this, and when they do so, the sale will be unimpeachable. I will not attempt to define how this may be done. Probably there are many ways. What I shall do is to inquire what, on the evidence, appears to have been done in this case, and then to confine myself to saying whether, on the facts of this particular case, it appears that an unreasonable use has been made of that confidence which the company did not indeed place in the promoters, for the company did not then exist, but which the Legislature did place in them for the company when it gave the promoters power to create it...

... the burden of proof lies on the fiduciary agents, agents selling to those to whom they owed a duty to prove, if not that sufficient protection had been afforded, at least that they had sufficient reasons for bonâ fide believing that sufficient protection had been afforded to their purchasers. If they could have proved that Sir Thomas Dakin was told that the price at which the property had been recently bought was £55,000, and also that the knew that Westall, by whom the prospectus was prepared, from evidence which he had collected, was not a disinterested attorney, but one having a strong bias in favour of the vendors, they should have done so. If such proof had been given, and it had been shewn that Sir Thomas Dakin, well aware that for these reasons he should receive the statements and evidence of value with caution, had satisfied himself that the bargain was a good one at £110,000, the case would have been very different. I doubt whether the opinion of one disinterested person so obtained would have been enough protection, but that it is not necessary to consider if, as I think, it is not proved that even this slight degree of protection was given.

My Lords, I have felt much doubt and difficulty as to the second question, though, on the whole, I think the Plaintiffs have not lost their remedy.

Several points were made and argued, as to which I think it unnecessary to say more than that I think they were satisfactorily disposed of in the judgments below. That on which I have difficulty, and to which I shall confine my remarks, is whether laches and acquiescence is made out to such an extent as to deprive the company of the remedy by rescission which they had if they had come promptly. Some things are to my mind clear. The contract was not void, but only voidable at the election of the company.

In Clough v The London and North Western Railway Company, in the judgment of the Exchequer Chamber, it is said, “We agree that the contract continues valid till the party defrauded has determined his election by avoiding it. In such cases, (i.e., of fraud) the question is, Has the person on whom the fraud was practised, having notice of the fraud, elected not to avoid the contract? Or, Has he elected to avoid it? Or, Has he made no election? We think that so long as he has made no election he retains the right to determine it either way; subject to this, that if, in the interval whilst he is deliberating, an innocent third party has acquired an interest in the property, or if, in consequence of his delay the position even of the wrongdoer is affected, it will preclude him from exercising his right to rescind.” It is, I think, clear on principles of general justice, that as a condition to a rescission there must be a restitutio in integrum . The parties must be put in statu quo . See per Lord Cranworth in Addie v The Western Bank. It is a doctrine which has often been acted upon both at law and in equity. But there is a considerable difference in the mode in which it is applied in Courts of Law and Equity, owing, as I think, to the difference of the machinery which the Courts have at command. I speak of these Courts as they were at the time when this suit commenced, without inquiring whether the Judicature Acts make any, or if any, what difference.

It would be obviously unjust that a person who has been in possession of property under the contract which he seeks to repudiate should be allowed to throw that back on the other party's hands without accounting for any benefit he may have derived from the use of the property, or if the property, though not destroyed, has been in the interval deteriorated, without making compensation for that deterioration. But as a Court of Law has no machinery at its command for taking an account of such matters, the defrauded party, if he sought his remedy at law, must in such cases keep the property and sue in an action for deceit, in which the jury, if properly directed, can do complete justice by giving as damages a full indemnity for all that the party has lost: see Clarke v Dixon, and the cases there cited.

But a Court of Equity could not give damages, and, unless it can rescind the contract, can give no relief. And, on the other hand, it can take accounts of profits, and make allowance for deterioration. And I think the practice has always been for a Court of Equity to give this relief whenever, by the exercise of its powers, it can do what is practically just, though it cannot restore the parties precisely to the state they were in before the contract. And a Court of Equity requires that those who come to it to ask its active interposition to give them relief, should use due diligence, after there has been such notice or knowledge as to make it inequitable to lie by. And any change which occurs in the position of the parties or the state of the property after such notice or knowledge should tell much more against the party in morâ, than a similar change before he was in morâ should do.

In Lindsay Petroleum Company v Hurd, it is said: “The doctrine of laches in Courts of Equity is not an arbitrary or a technical doctrine. Where it would be practically unjust to give a remedy, either because the party has, by his conduct done that which might fairly be regarded as equivalent to a waiver of it, or where, by his conduct and neglect he has, though perhaps not waiving that remedy, yet put the other party in a situation in which it would not be reasonable to place him if the remedy were afterwards to be asserted, in either of these cases lapse of time and delay are most material. But in every case if an argument against relief, which otherwise would be just, is founded upon mere delay, that delay of course not amounting to a bar by any statute of limitations, the validity of that defence must be tried upon principles substantially equitable. Two circumstances always important in such cases are the length of the delay and the nature of the acts done during the interval, which might affect either party and cause a balance of justice or injustice in taking the one course or the other, so far as relates to the remedy.” I have looked in vain for any authority which gives a more distinct and definite rule than this; and I think, from the nature of the inquiry, it must always be a question of more or less, depending on the degree of diligence which might reasonably be required, and the degree of change, which has occurred, whether the balance of justice or injustice is in favour of granting the remedy or withholding it. The determination of such a question must largely depend on the turn of mind of those who have to decide, and must therefore be subject to uncertainty; but that, I think, is inherent in the nature of the inquiry.

The Plaintiffs in this case are an incorporated company; but I think that in considering the question of laches the Court cannot divest itself of the knowledge that the corporation is an aggregate of individuals. The knowledge of one shareholder is not the knowledge of the others; but I think great injustice might sometimes be done if it were held that where it is shewn that all the shareholders who paid reasonable attention to the affairs of the company had notice sufficient to make it laches in them not to act promptly, there could not be laches in the company unless the notice was brought home to the company in its corporate capacity. But at the same time it should be recollected that shareholders who seek to set aside a contract made by the governing body, have practically first to change that governing body, and must have time to do so. Now in the present case every allottee had from the beginning by the prospectus full notice that the vendor, John Marsh Evans, was also one of their directors, which alone might have given them an equity to set aside the contract, though in every other respect it was unimpeachable. If that had been the only ground on which the shareholders were entitled to relief, its seems clear that it would have been impossible to give it even the day after the directors took possession and paid the price. They had, however, much more substantial equities, but they had also notice of more, for the prospectus referring to the contract, which was open to inspection at the office, I think each allottee was fixed with the knowledge, which he would have had if he had read it, that Evans had purchased from Chatteris so recently as the 30th of August, not quite three weeks before he sold to the company. He would have not known at what price it had been purchased, but as that was known to all who had an interest in the company under liquidation, either as creditors or contributors, it could very easily have been ascertained. And, in fact, it was known and stated at the meeting in February. Now though this was not actual knowledge that the other four directors had not made independent inquiry before making the purchase, it was enough, in my opinion, to have put any reasonable shareholder upon inquiry. And the circumstances attending the nature of the property, which are mentioned by the Lord Chancellor in his opinion, were such as to make it proper for those who intended to get rid of the bargain to act with considerable promptitude. What weighs most with me is that it appears that if the price of phosphate had not fallen below £5 a ton, there would have been a profit of £1 a ton, and the bargain would not have been a bad one; if it had risen the bargain would have been a good one, and would no doubt have been approved. But I see nothing to lead to the conclusion that the shareholders were waiting to see how the market turned out. Prices no doubt began to fall about February, 1872, and continued to fall, but not with a sudden fall. If I thought the shareholders had been waiting to see how the market ruled it might have made a difference in my opinion. If no steps to repudiate a purchase of a lottery ticket were taken till after the ticket came up a blank, so that the purchaser, if it came up a prize, might have kept it, it would surely be inequitable to set aside the contract then. And though not nearly so strong a case, such delay seems to be somewhat of that nature...

On the other hand, I feel that there is much force in the observation that those who deal inequitably with a company know that it must necessarily be slow in its proceedings, and are not entitled to complain that time elapses; and that it is not desirable that such a rule should be laid down as would practically deprive a company when defrauded of relief. And this is a reason against considering a company as precluded from that relief to which it would otherwise be entitled, on account of delay, unless the delay is excessive. I can find no case in which even a private individual has been precluded by mere delay, except where the delay has been very much greater than in this case. In Prendergrast v Turton nine years elapsed. In Clegg v Edmondson, nearly as long; and in both cases the Plaintiff had lain by whilst the Defendants were investing money in the mine, until that investment proved to be remunerative. It was clearly not equitable to leave the Defendants to all the risk of loss, and claim to themselves a profit; and this seems to be what Lord Eldon principally relied on in Norway v Rowe. In the present case that is no ground for imputing to the Plaintiffs what Lord Lyndhurst in Prendergrast v Turton calls a “conditional acquiescence.” As is pointed out in Clarke v Hart, there was in Prendergrast v Turton very nearly, if not quite a legal defence. Here, taking the time at which the active shareholders were put upon exerting diligence to be February, there was not quite nine months before the filing of the bill; that is not very long for getting the majority of shareholders to make an inquiry, turn out the board, and get proper advice, before instituting a Chancery suit. And having come to the conclusion before, that the company had once had the right to this relief, I think the burthen is on the Defendants to shew that the company have precluded themselves from the relief to which they had a right. I do not think this is made out.

Lord Penzance, Lord Hatherley, Lord O'Hagan, Lord Selborne and Lord Gordon concurred.

== See also ==
- English unjust enrichment
- Lambert v Co-operative Insurance Society Ltd [1975] 2 Lloyd's Rep 485

American cases

- Smith v. Bolles, 132 U.S. 125 (1889) damages for misrepresentation of share sale did not entitle the buyer to get money as if the representation were true
