= Expectation damages =

Damages recoverable from a breached contract

Expectation damages are damages recoverable from a breach of contract by the non-breaching party. An award of expectation damages protects the injured party's interest in realising the value of the expectancy that was created by the promise of the other party. Thus, the impact of the breach on the promisee is to be effectively "undone" with the award of expectation damages.

The purpose of expectation damages is to put the non-breaching party in the position it would have occupied had the contract been fulfilled. Expectation damages can be contrasted to reliance damages and restitution damages, which are remedies that address other types of interests of parties involved in enforceable promises.

The default for expectation damages are monetary damages which are subject to limitations or exceptions (see below)

Expectation damages are measured by the diminution in value, coupled with consequential and incidental damages.

== History ==
In Robinson v Harman (1848), B Parke of the Exchequer Court established that under the rule of common law, as per Hopkins v. Grazebrook, (Note: Hopkins v. Grazebrook (6 B. & C. 31) was an 1826 King's Bench case where the vendor of a property knew that he had no title on which he could sell the land but expected to be able to procure title before sale. The judgment was overruled by the House of Lords in Bain v Fothergill in 1874.) the plaintiff is entitled to recover damages, to what means money can, as if the contract had been performed. B Alderson agreed, assessing that according to the general rule of law if a contract is made and an individual breaches that contract, the whole damage sustained to the innocent party must be paid. Thus, expectation damages were established under one of the guiding common law principles in awarding damages restitutio in integrum (restoration to original condition). After this case expectation damages as a form of compensatory damages became the norm in apportioning damages in breach of contract cases.

== Measuring expectation damages ==
In expectation damages, the measure of damages is the difference between what was given and what was promised, along with consequential and incidental expenses minus any payments received from the breaching party and any costs saved as a result of the breach. The proper amount is that which gives the non-breaching party the "benefit of the bargain". However, expectation damages are not punitive; its theoretical purpose is to place the injured, non-breaching party in the same position that they would have occupied had there been full performance of the contract. In other words, it is the amount that makes the injured party indifferent to the breach.

Examples:

- General contractor accepts an offer from a subcontractor and enters into a contract. The general contractor breaches / repudiates their contract part way through the subcontractor's performance. Generally, the subcontractor is entitled to seek an amount equal to the contract price or unrealised value of the promised performance plus costs incurred in preparing or performing under the contract (and costs incidental to the breach e.g., storage costs, restocking fees for returns; penalties or costs for canceling contracts, supply orders etc.) minus any progress payments made by the general contractor and minus costs saved by the breach; can include anticipated profit.
- Neal signs a contract agreeing to buy 10 hours of landscaping services from John's Landscaping for $50 an hour. If Neal breaks the contract and doesn't use any of John's Landscaping's services, expectation damages paid to John's Landscaping would be $500 minus any costs John's Landscaping may have saved, which is the economic loss they suffered. If John's Landscaping breaks the contract, and Neal is forced to hire another service for $60 an hour, expectation (direct) damages paid to Neal would equal $100 ($10 an hour, the difference in price between the original contract and the new contract).

== Potential exceptions or limitations ==
- Duty to mitigate - the aggrieved party has a duty to take reasonable steps to mitigate damages. Failure to take such steps can cut off damages which arose from such a failure to take reasonable steps to mitigate. This is a duty of reasonable care thus no duty to take steps which are unreasonably burdensome. Example - buyer breaches contract to purchase produce; seller is expected to mitigate e.g., "cover" under the U.S. Uniform Commercial Code or resale; failure to make reasonable attempts to resell can be a ground to deny damages arising from breach e.g., spoilage. Breaching party is liable for costs which arise from an effort to take reasonable steps to mitigate. E.g., party continues to work after being notified of a breach and running up the bill. (however, this might be reasonable if the aggrieved party reasonably believed they had a better chance of selling a completed product to an alternative buyer).
- Reasonable certainty - must be able to calculate the damages based on reasonably certain facts or comparable situations. Cannot have a calculation based wholly on guesses. In cases of doubt, many jurisdictions have adopted a view that the breaching party should bear the risk of doubt rather than the aggrieved party.
- Foreseeability - Generally, no consequential damages unless they are known or foreseeable. e.g., no lost profits for third party transactions (e.g., Hadley v Baxendale case below), holding that Baxendale could only be held liable for losses that were generally foreseeable, or if Hadley had mentioned his special circumstances in advance. The mere fact that a party is sending something to be repaired does not indicate that they would lose profits if it were not delivered on time. The court suggested various other circumstances under which Hadley could have entered into this contract that would not have presented such dire circumstances, and noted that where special circumstances exist, provisions can be made in the contract voluntarily entered into by the parties to impose extra damages for a breach. e.g. Hadley v Baxendale.
- Cost of performance or a proposed measure of damage greatly exceeds the market value of full performance (Peevyhouse v Garland Coal & Mining Co) E.g., land owner contract with coal company promised restoration of land after mining complete - coal company refused to comply; court found the cost of restoration (~$30k) grossly exceeded the value of the property in unrestored condition ($300 price difference between condition before and after coal mining). However, this case has been widely criticised; 2nd Restatement of the Law criticised it; many courts will not follow this rule thus, would decline to award damages based on market value based on view that damages should be awarded based on actual harm to injured party versus hypothetical market value - dependent on jurisdiction)

== Prevalence ==
The reason for expectation damages being the norm is that it is widely proven that the size of the recovery of expectation damages is often similar to that of reliance damages but is easier to prove than reliance damages. In Australia, a party usually only claims reliance damages in the case where expectation damages are deemed to be unable to be proven. This is because expectation damages include profit, whereas reliance damages generally just cover wasted expenditure, so reliance damages are rarely greater than expectation damages.

== See also ==
- Robinson v Harman, (1848) 1 Ex Rep 850, an English contract law case concluding that the claimant ought to be placed in the same situation, with respect to damages, as if the contract had been performed.
- Smith v. Bolles, 132 U.S. 125 (1889), limiting expectation damages from fraudulent conduct to those legitimately attributable to defendant's misrepresentation, and precluding awards based on unrealized speculation.
- Hawkins v. McGee, 84 N.H. 114, 146 A. 641 (N.H. 1929) the "Case of the Hairy Hand" in New Hampshire state case law.
- Loss of chance in English law
- Restatement (Second) of Contract
- Restatement (Second) of Contracts § 344(a), Purpose of Remedies
- Restatement (Second) of Contracts § 347, Measure of Damages in General
- Uniform Commercial Code (UCC)
