= Thomas Joshua Platt =

British judge

Sir Thomas Joshua Platt KC (22 August 1788 – 10 February 1862) was a British judge who served as a Baron of the Exchequer.

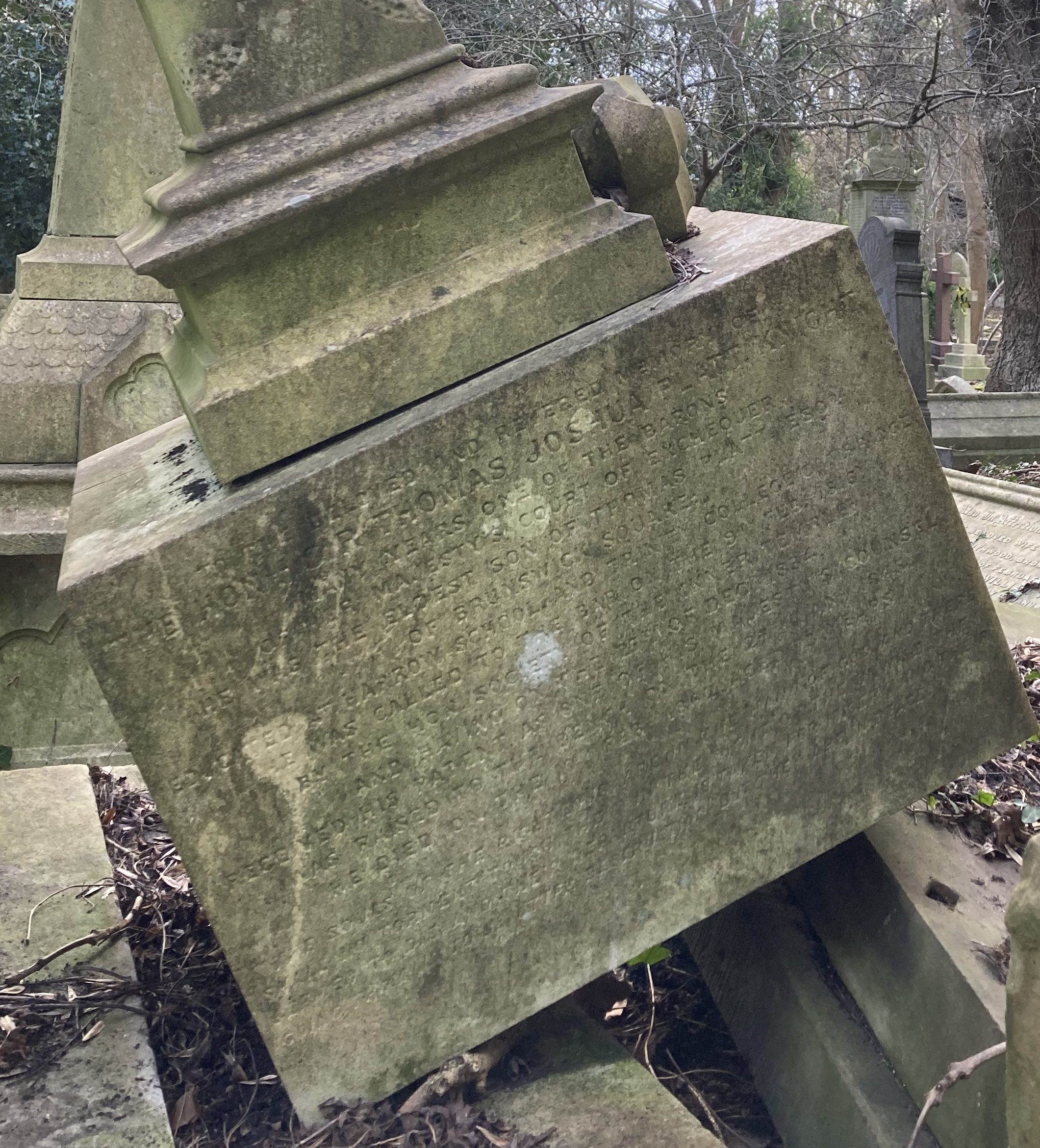
Grave of Thomas Joshua Platt in Highgate Cemetery (west side)

== Biography ==
Platt, born in 1788, was the son of Thomas and Amelia Platt of London. His father was a solicitor who served as principal clerk to Lords Mansfield, Kenyon, and Ellenborough. He was educated at Harrow and at Trinity College, Cambridge, where he graduated B.A. 1810, and M.A. 1814.

He was called to the bar at the Inner Temple on 9 February 1816, and named a king's counsellor on 27 December 1834, when he became a favourite leader on the home circuit. As an advocate he was remarkable for the energy of his manner and the simplicity of his language. Before a common jury he was usually invincible, but met with fewer successes before special juries. He succeeded Baron Gurney as a Baron of the Exchequer on 28 January 1845, and sat until failing health obliged him to retire on 2 November 1856. He was knighted at St. James's Palace on 23 April 1845.

In the Dictionary of National Biography, George Clement Boase states that he was "not deeply read", but "he proved a sensible judge, while his blunt courtesy and amiability made him popular with the bar". He died at 59 Portland Place in London, on 10 February 1862, and was buried in Highgate Cemetery. His widow, Augusta, died at 61 Queen's Gardens, Hyde Park, London, on 16 February 1885, aged 88. Together they had a large family.

== Attribution ==
This article incorporates text from a publication now in the public domain: "Platt, Thomas Joshua". Dictionary of National Biography. London: Smith, Elder & Co. 1885–1900.
