= Richard J. Bolles =

American businessman (1843–1917)

Richard J. "Dickie" Bolles
- Born: Richard Johnson Bolles; August 1, 1843; New York City, U.S.
- Died: March 25, 1917 (aged 73); Palm Beach County, Florida, U.S.
- Education: Juris Doctor
- Alma mater: Columbia University
- Occupation: Capitalist
- Known for: Namesake of The Bolles School
- Height: 5 ft 6 in (168 cm)
- Board member of: New York Stock Exchange
- Criminal charges: Mail and wire fraud
- Spouse: Julia Arabel Sherman (m. 1867; div. 1895)
- Parents: Dr. Richard M. Bolles (father); Henrietta Hodgkinson (mother)

Richard J. Bolles (August 1, 1843 – March 25, 1917) was born in New York City and was given the nickname, "Dickie" because of his 5'6" height. He has been described by various sources as the Napoleon of Finance, a flamboyant capitalist, a wealthy mining man, a philanthropist, and a land swindler. In his later years he was an early Florida land salesman who was one of the first to market land in small tracts to future Florida residents. His obituary stated, "During his long life, it is said, he made and lost several fortunes."

== Early years ==
His parents were Dr. Richard M. Bolles and Henrietta Hodgkinson. Bolles had a natural talent for real estate and investments, earning a seat at the New York Stock Exchange at age 23 which he held for many years. Bolles married Julia Arabel Sherman in 1867; he was 24, she was 27 and a niece of General William Tecumseh Sherman. Bolles graduated from Columbia University in 1882.

== Colorado ==
Bolles went west in 1885 for business opportunities in Aspen, Colorado. In 1890 he settled in Colorado Springs where according to his obituary, "At one time he owned in Colorado what was said to be the richest silver mine in the world, his holdings there netting him $6 million." Agnes W. Cain was a shrewd Cleveland businesswoman, age 36, who became his secretary during his successful Colorado mining days. Bolles filed a fraud case in 1889, Smith v. Bolles, that went to the United States Supreme Court.

Bolles and his wife had no children, and she was left behind during Bolles' constant business travel. Mrs. Bolles relocated by herself from New York City to San Diego in 1887 after 20 years of marriage. She was described as very attractive and went by the name, Madam Bizette. Around 1890 she moved to San Francisco, residing at the Occidental Hotel. Madam Bizette was charming, talented, discreet, but mysterious. With a French accent, wardrobe and grace, she was popular with San Francisco's Four Hundred, writing novels and plays, painting, playing and teaching music. After a time, private detectives arrived in San Francisco to investigate Madam Bizette. She was aware of everything but offered no explanation. Sometime later, she announced that she was going east, and she was gone. In 1894, one of Madam Bizette's friends from San Francisco saw her at the Fifth Avenue Hotel in New York City. They began to greet her, but the mystery woman cut them off saying, "I am Mrs. Bolles." She told the friend that she could manage just fine without her husband, his name and his money. However, it was rumored that after the detectives visited, "she did accept some allowance from her quondam lord and master."

Mrs. Bolles engaged Mrs. Clara Foltz, a noted San Francisco lawyer, to travel to Colorado and file for divorce in 1895 for desertion. The divorce was granted unopposed and Mrs. Bolles received $200,000.

== Florida ==
In 1907, Bolles was invited by Florida's Governor, Napoleon Broward, to assist in draining Everglades and developing the area around Miami. The following year Bolles and investors from Colorado Springs founded the Florida Fruit Lands company and purchased 500,000 acres (200,000 ha; 780 sq mi) of undeveloped land for $2/acre from the Florida Internal Improvement Fund with the stipulation that 50% of proceeds from land sales would be used to drain Everglades land.

Bolle's salesmen began to sell Florida swampland as farmland in Palm Beach and Dade Counties. His sales force travelled across the country promoting submerged Everglades land as "the Promised Land" and "the Garden of Eden". Nothing was spoken about the land being drained in the future. Bolles settled in Jacksonville in 1909 and worked from the Bisbee Building; the upscale Seminole Club was his residence. He was accompanied by Agnes W. Cain, his secretary.

His sales pitch was ultimately a scam and the truth eventually was revealed. In 1911, unhappy customers brought suit against him. In 1913 he faced trial but claimed that his salesmen misrepresented the land sold due to being "misled by officials of the State of Florida and officials of the United States Department of Agriculture." Bolles was acquitted as an "honest man". His obituary in the Daily Oklahoman stated Bolles was "indicted in 1913 in Kansas City in connection with alleged Everglades land sale swindles...the trial of the case against Bolles in Federal Court at Kansas City, Missouri on a charge of using the mails to defraud, has been postponed from time to time because of the defendant's ill health."

On March 26, 1917, Bolles collapsed on Florida East Coast Railway Train 86 en route from Palm Beach to Jacksonville. Members of the Boston Red Sox from the American League Baseball team were travelling from Miami to Macon in the same sleeper car. They attempted to save him but were unsuccessful. After his death, federal charges were dismissed.

== Estate ==
When Bolles died suddenly in 1917 at age 73, Agnes Cain took control of his estate. Cain had been in Jacksonville for nearly ten years and was well established in local real estate and investment circles. A young Roger Painter began working for Bolles in 1916 for $4/week doing office jobs. After working together for several years, Agnes and Roger hit it off and were married early 1923 when he was 21 and she was 48. Claude Nolan's San Jose Company donated its interest in the San Jose development to the estate of Richard Bolle's before ground was broken, so the estate held a $200,000 real estate mortgage on the San Jose Hotel when it opened on New Years Day in 1926. One year later the estate held a mortgage on the personal property in the hotel including equipment, fixtures and furniture.

Florida's real estate bubble burst, land purchasers stopped making payments and construction shut down.

In 1928 the hotel closed its doors permanently. Cain began foreclosure proceedings and San Jose Estates declared bankruptcy. The estate of Richard J. Bolles owned the property. Agnes and her husband formed the Bolles Investment Company as a corporation. Roger Painter assumed the presidency with his wife as treasurer. The hotel and contents was sold by the Bolles estate for $225,000 in capital stock to the Bolles Investment Company. Following the sale, the property was leased for one year, $100,000 by a hotel group. The Florida Military Academy had been located in Green Cove Springs. In 1929 they signed a lease for the property and moved to Jacksonville. Mr. & Mrs. Painter moved into the foreclosed former hotel before it was leased to the Florida Military Academy.

By the summer in 1932, the effects of the depression caused the academy to default on their lease and they packed up, leaving the former hotel vacant. John C. Cooper, a Jacksonville attorney, suggested the Painters start a school, which the community needed. Although neither of the Painters had any formal education or experience with a school, they founded The Bolles School as a male military preparatory school and it opened on January 5, 1933. They hired Dr. H. W. Lewis as headmaster. Dr. Lewis was a Harvard graduate with 25 years of educational experience. Roger Painter became school president, and the state of Florida made him a Lt. Colonel in the Florida militia. The school's namesake was their former boss, Richard J. Bolles, who died 16 years before the school was founded.

In 1983, George Hallam, an English Professor at Jacksonville University wrote the book, Bolles: The Standard Bearer. In it, Hallam quoted from Richard Bolles' journals: "I am in nearly every business and social transaction guided almost entirely by impulse, with no fixed principles."

== See also ==
- Bolles: The Standard Bearer by George W Hallam / Bolles School, 1983
- Up for Grabs by John Rothchild / University Press of Florida, 1985
