= Reliance damages =

In law, reliance damages measure the compensation to be given to a person who has suffered an economic harm through acting in reliance on a party who failed to fulfill their contractual obligation. If the injured party could go back in time, they should be indifferent to entering into the contract that would be breached and receiving the reliance damages as opposed to not entering into any contract with the breaching party. The injured party should be put in a substantially similar situation position as they would have been had the contract not been entered into. This is different from expectation damages, where the injured party should be indifferent between the fulfillment of the contract and never having entered into the contract.

== Scope ==
Reliance damages are valued by a party's reliance interest for the reasonably foreseeable amount. They put the injured party in the same financial position as if the contract had never been formed.

Reliance interest is one of the three prongs of interest discussed by legal experts Lou Fuller and William Perdue in their 1936 article, "The Reliance Interest in Contract Damages". The other two interests are expectation interest and restitution interest.

== Application ==
Under contract law, in a bilateral contract two or more parties owe obligations to each other. Each party acts in reliance that the other party will fulfill their respective obligation. If one party fails to fulfill their obligation, then the other party may suffer an economic harm. Reliance damages compensate the harmed party for the amount of damage they suffered by acting in reliance on the other party's contractual obligations. They are most often rewarded when the aggrieved party's damages are not capable of accurate estimation and ordering specific performance would be inappropriate. Specific performance should never be associated with reliance damages, as specific performance is almost never purely financial, and reliance damages are generally a purely financial remedy.

Reliance damages may be differentiated from restitution damages in the context of partial performance. Restitution damages may be invoked when the injured party confers a benefit upon a breaching party, and the breaching party does not fulfill their obligations with the benefit provided by the injured party. If reliance damages are to be invoked, the injured party has generally not conveyed a particular benefit to the breaching party; rather the injured party put themselves in a vulnerable situation in reliance on an action from a breaching party, and that breaching party allowed the injured party to suffer harm as a result of the breaching party's action or inaction.

However, it must be reasonably foreseeable to the breaching party that the injured party would be harmed by the breaching party's behavior. If the injured party takes unreasonable action that irrationally relies on a behavior from the breaching party, a court may decide that an injured party may not warrant reliance damages from the breaching party.

Under English law, a claimant in a breach of contract case has a choice over whether to claim loss of profits or to recover wasted expenditure. In CCC Films (London) Ltd v Impact Quadrant Films Ltd [1985] 1 QB 16, a "legal presumption" was tested out, stating that where the plaintiff would not have wasted the expenditure if the Defendant had not been in breach of duty, the burden of proof was on the defendant to prove that, regardless of their breach of duty, the expenditure would not have been or may not have been recovered. In this case, CCC Films provided no evidence that they would have made sufficient earnings if certain lost tapes had been received to recoup their lost expenditure; equally, the defendants failed to provide evidence that they would not have done so. Hutchison J held that CCC Films' reliance claim succeeded in full. The CCC case shows that a reliance claim for wasted expenditure can include costs incurred before the contract was entered into.

Under United States law, reliance damages are the type of damages awarded in promissory estoppel claims, although they can also be awarded in traditional contract breaches. This is appropriate because even if there is no bargain principle in the agreement, one party has relied on a promise and thus is damaged to the extent of their reliance. These damages must be proven with reasonable certainty. It is not enough that one party simply guess as to how much they are actually damaged.

In a losing contract, reliance damages will be reduced because the aggrieved party cannot be put in a better position had the contract been performed. Here, the losses from the contract will be subtracted from the reliance damages.

== Examples ==
- Neal and Matt formed a bilateral contract. Neal spent $100 in reliance on the contract, which was foreseeable. However, Matt breached the contract. Reliance damages protect a party's reliance interest. Neal spent $100 in reliance on the contract, which constituted Neal's reliance interest. Since reliance damages equal to the value of the reliance interest of the injured party, Matt owes Neal $100: this puts Neal in the same economic position as if the contract never happened.
- In a promissory estoppel context, consider the following example: Neal, a professional photographer, offers to sell his high-quality camera to Matt for $1,000. Matt, an aspiring photographer, agrees to buy the camera and informs Neal that he will enroll in an expensive photography workshop to improve his skills, relying on the availability of Neal's camera. Neal acknowledges Matt's plans and promises to sell the camera to him. Based on Neal's promise, Matt enrolls in the workshop, paying a non-refundable fee of $500. Before Matt pays for the camera, Neal decides to sell it to another buyer at a higher price. Unable to find an alternative camera at a similar price, Matt is unable to participate in the workshop.

In this scenario, Matt may claim reliance damages from Neal based on promissory estoppel. To establish a case, Matt must prove:

1. A clear and unambiguous promise made by Neal (selling the camera for $1,000);
2. Reasonable and foreseeable reliance by Matt on the promise;
3. Detriment to Matt as a result of his reliance on the promise (losing the non-refundable $500 workshop fee);
4. Injustice that can only be avoided by enforcing the promise.

Here, all elements of promissory estoppel appear to be met. Neal made a clear promise, Matt's reliance was reasonable and foreseeable, and Matt suffered a detriment as a result of Neal's breach of promise. Enforcing the promise would prevent injustice. If a court finds that promissory estoppel applies, Matt may be awarded reliance damages to compensate him for the loss incurred due to his reliance on Neal's promise. In this example, the reliance damages would amount to the $500 non-refundable workshop fee, which Matt would not have paid had Neal not promised to sell him the camera. This award would aim to put Matt in the position he would have been in had Neal fulfilled his promise.

== See also ==
- Damages
- Expectation damages
- Restitution
