= Incidental damages =

Incidental damages refers to the type of legal damages that are reasonably associated with, or related to, actual damages.

In American commercial law, incidental damages are a seller's commercially reasonable expenses incurred in stopping delivery or in transporting and caring for goods after a buyer's breach of contract, or a buyer's expenses reasonably incurred, e.g., searching for and obtaining substitute goods.
