= Smith New Court Securities Ltd v Scrimgeour Vickers (Asset Management) Ltd =

UK legal case

Smith New Court Ltd v Scrimgeour Vickers (Asset Management) Ltd
- Court: House of Lords
- Full case name: Smith New Court Securities Limited v Scrimgeour Vickers (Asset Management) Limited and others
- Decided: 21 November 1996
- Citations: [1996] UKHL 3; [1997] AC 254; [1996] 4 All ER 769; [1996] 3 WLR 1051

Court membership
- Judges sitting: Lord Browne-Wilkinson, Lord Keith of Kinkel, Lord Mustill, Lord Slynn of Hadley, Lord Steyn

Keywords
- Misrepresentation, deceit

Smith New Court Ltd v Scrimgeour Vickers (Asset Management) Ltd [1996] UKHL 3 is an English contract law case concerning misrepresentation. It illustrates the damages available for deceit.

== Facts ==
An employee of Scrimgeour, Mr Roberts, fraudulently told Smith New Court that there were close rival bids for buying shares in Ferranti IS Inc. Smith bought £23.1m worth of shares. Ferranti then revealed it was a victim of a massive fraud (the ‘Guerin’ fraud, an American businessman had sold them a worthless company) and the share price fell considerably. Smith sold the shares for £11,788,204, a loss of £11,353,220. Smith then brought an action for deceit.

== Judgment ==
=== Court of Appeal ===
The Court of Appeal awarded £1,196,010 in damages to reflect the difference between what was paid and the market value at the date of purchase.

=== House of Lords ===
Lord Browne-Wilkinson held that Smith New Court was entitled to the full loss of £11.3m. He laid down seven principles as follows:

(1) the defendant must make reparation from all damage coming directly from the transaction
(2) foreseeability is irrelevant
(3) the full price paid can be recovered, minus any benefits he received resulting from the transaction
(4) a general rule is that benefits include market price as at the date of acquisition, but this is not to be inflexible to prevent full compensation
(5) that general rule does normally not apply when misrepresentation continues to operate after acquisition, inducing the claimant to retain the asset, or the claimant is locked into holding the property by reason of the fraud
(6) consequential loss is recoverable...
(7) ...subject to mitigation once fraud is discovered.

Smith would only have paid for an acquisition as a market making risk. As such, Smith could not dispose of them on 21 July 1989 otherwise than at a loss. Smith were in a special sense locked into the shares…

Lord Steyn asked,

whether there is a justification for differentiating between the extent of liability for civil wrongs depending on where in the sliding scale from strict liability to intentional wrongdoing the particular civil wrong fits in. It may be said that logical symmetry and a policy of not punishing intentional wrongdoers by civil remedies favour a uniform rule. On the other hand, it is a rational and defensible strategy to impose wider liability on an intentional wrongdoer… as between the fraudster and the innocent party, moral considerations militate in favour of requiring the fraudster to bear the risk of misfortunes directly caused by his fraud. I make no apology for referring to moral considerations. The law and morality are inextricably interwoven.

Lords Keith, Slynn and Mustill concurred.

== See also ==
- English contract law
- Misrepresentation in English law
- UK company law
- South Australia Asset Management Corpn v York Montague Ltd [1997] AC 191, a negligence case where the scope of duty was restricted against responsibility for fall in the market price.
