= Damages =

Legal term for compensation awarded for loss or injury

In common law, damages are a remedy in the form of a monetary award to be paid to a claimant as compensation for loss or injury. To warrant the award, the claimant must show that a breach of duty has caused foreseeable loss. To be recognized at law, the loss must involve damage to property, or mental or physical injury; pure economic loss is rarely recognized for the award of damages.

Compensatory damages are further categorized into special damages, which are economic losses such as loss of earnings, property damage and medical expenses, as well as general damages, which are non-economic damages such as pain and suffering and emotional distress. Rather than being compensatory, at common law damages may instead be nominal, contemptuous or exemplary.

== History ==
Among the Saxons, a monetary value called a weregild was assigned to every human being and every piece of property in the Salic law. If property was stolen or someone was injured or killed, the guilty person had to pay the weregild as restitution to the victim's family or to the owner of the property.

== Proof of damages ==
=== Proximate cause ===
Recovery of damages by a plaintiff in lawsuit is subject to the legal principle that damages must be proximately caused by the wrongful conduct of the defendant. This is known as the principle of proximate cause. This principle governs the recovery of all compensatory damages, whether the underlying claim is based on contract, tort, or both. Damages are likely to be limited to those reasonably foreseeable by the defendant. If a defendant could not reasonably have foreseen that someone might be hurt by their actions, there may be no liability.

This rule does not usually apply to intentional torts (for example, tort of deceit) and also has stunted applicability to the quantum in negligence where the maxim "intended consequences are never too remote" applies: "never" is inaccurate here but resorts to unforeseeable direct and natural consequences of an act.

=== Expert testimony ===
It may be useful for the lawyers, the plaintiff, and/or the defendant to employ forensic accountants or someone trained in the relevant field of economics to give evidence on the value of the loss. In this case, they may be called upon to give opinion evidence as an expert witness.

== Compensatory damages ==
Compensatory damages are paid to compensate the claimant for loss, injury, or harm suffered by the claimant as a result of another's breach of duty that caused the loss. For example, compensatory damages may be awarded as the result of a negligence claim under tort law. Expectation damages are used in contract law to put an injured party in the position it would have occupied but for the breach. Compensatory damages can be classified as special damages and general damages.

=== Quantum (measure) of damages ===
Liability for payment of an award of damages is established when the claimant proves, on the balance of probabilities, that a defendant's wrongful act caused a tangible harm, loss or injury to the plaintiff. Once that threshold is met, the plaintiff is entitled to some amount of recovery for that loss or injury. No recovery is not an option. The court must then assess the amount of compensation attributable to the harmful acts of the defendant. The amount of damages a plaintiff would recover is usually measured on a "loss of bargain" basis, also known as expectation loss, or "economic loss". This concept reflects the difference between "the value of what has been received and its value as represented".

Damages are usually assessed at the date of the wrongful act, but in England and Wales, Judge Pelling in Murfin v Ford Campbell has observed that this is not the case if justice requires the assessment of damages to be calculated at some other date. In Murfin v Ford Campbell, an agreement had been entered into whereby company shares were exchanged for loan notes, which could only be redeemed if certain profit thresholds had been achieved in the relevant accounting years. As the thresholds were not met, the loan notes were not redeemable, but at the date of the advisors' breach of contract this could not be known, only the loan notes' face value could be known. The conclusion was that in this case valuation could not be done until after the profit performance became known. In his judgement Pelling referred to Smith New Court Securities Ltd v Scrimgeour Vickers (Asset Management) Ltd, a case where continuing misrepresentation affected the appropriate date for damages to be assessed.

=== Special damages ===
Special damages compensate the claimant for the quantifiable monetary losses he has suffered. For example, extra costs, repair or replacement of damaged property; lost earnings (both historically and in the future); loss of irreplaceable items; additional domestic costs; and so on. They are seen in both personal and commercial actions. Special damages can include direct losses (such as amounts the claimant had to spend to try to mitigate damages) and consequential or economic losses resulting from lost profits in a business.

Damages in tort are awarded generally to place the claimant in the position in which he would have been had the tort not taken place. Damages for breach of contract are generally awarded to place the claimant in the position in which he would have been had the contract not been breached. This can often result in a different measure of damages. In cases where it is possible to frame a claim in either contract or tort, it is necessary to be aware of what gives the best outcome. If the transaction was a "good bargain", contract generally gives a better result for the claimant.

As an example, Neal agrees to sell Mary an antique Rolex watch for £100. In fact the watch is a fake and worth only £50. If it had been a genuine antique Rolex, it would have been worth £500. Neal is in breach of contract and could be sued. In contract, Mary is entitled to an item worth £500, but she has only one worth £50. Her damages are £450. Neal also induced Mary to enter into the contract through a misrepresentation (a tort). If Mary sues in tort, she is entitled to damages that put her back to the same financial position place she would have been in had the misrepresentation not been made. She would clearly not have entered into the contract knowing the watch was fake and is entitled to her £100 back. Thus her damages in tort are £100. (She would have to return the watch, or else her damages would be £50.)

If the transaction were a "bad bargain", tort gives a better result for the claimant. If in the above example, Mary had overpaid, paying £750 for the watch, her damages in the contract would still be £450 (giving her the item she contracted to buy), however, in tort damages are £750.

==== Incidental and consequential losses ====
Incidental damages include the costs needed to remedy problems and put things right. The largest element is likely to be the reinstatement of property damage. Take for example a factory which was burnt down by the negligence of a contractor. The claimant would be entitled to the direct costs required to rebuild the factory and replace the damaged machinery. The claimant may also be entitled to consequential damages. These may include the lost profits that the claimant could have been expected to make in the period whilst the factory was closed and rebuilt.

==== Breach of contract duty - (ex contract) ====
On a breach of contract by a defendant, a court generally awards the sum that would restore the injured party to the economic position they expected from performance of the promise or promises (known as an "expectation measure" or "benefit-of-the-bargain" measure of damages). This rule, however, has attracted increasing scrutiny from Australian courts and legal commentators. A judge arrives compensatory number by considering both the type of contract, and the loss incurred.

When it is either not possible or not desirable to award the victim in that way, a court may award money damages designed to restore the injured party to the economic position they occupied at the time the contract was entered (known as the "reliance measure") or designed to prevent the breaching party from being unjustly enriched ("restitution", see below).

Parties may contract for liquidated damages to be paid upon a breach of the contract by one of the parties. Under common law, a liquidated damages clause will not be enforced if the purpose of the term is solely to punish a breach (in this case it is termed penal damages). The clause will be enforceable if it involves a genuine attempt to quantify a loss in advance and is a good faith estimate of economic loss. Courts have ruled as excessive and invalidated damages which the parties contracted as liquidated, but which the court nonetheless found to be penal. To determine whether a clause is a liquidated damages clause or a penalty clause, it is necessary to consider:

1. Whether the clause is 'extravagant, out of all proportion, exorbitant or unconscionable'
2. Whether there is a single sum stipulated for a number of different breaches, or individual sums for each breach
3. Whether a genuine pre-estimate of damage is ascertainable

==== Breach of tort duty – (ex delicto) ====
Damages in tort are generally awarded to place the claimant in the position that would have been taken had the tort not taken place. Damages in tort are quantified under two headings: general damages and special damages.

In personal injury claims, damages for compensation are quantified by reference to the severity of the injuries sustained (see below general damages for more details). In non-personal injury claims, for instance, a claim for professional negligence against solicitors, the measure of damages will be assessed by the loss suffered by the client due to the negligent act or omission by the solicitor giving rise to the loss. The loss must be reasonably foreseeable and not too remote. Financial losses are usually simple to quantify but in complex cases which involve loss of pension entitlements and future loss projections, the instructing solicitor will usually employ a specialist expert actuary or accountant to assist with the quantification of the loss.

=== General damages ===
General damages are monetary compensation for the non-monetary aspects of the specific harm suffered. These damages are sometimes termed "pain, suffering and loss of amenity". Examples of this include physical or emotional pain and suffering, loss of companionship, loss of consortium, disfigurement, loss of reputation, impairment of mental or physical capacity, hedonic damages or loss of enjoyment of life, etc. This is not easily quantifiable, and depends on the individual circumstances of the claimant.

==== United Kingdom ====
Judges in the United Kingdom base the award on damages awarded in similar previous cases. In 2012 the Court of Appeal of England and Wales notes:

this court has not merely the power, but a positive duty, to monitor, and where appropriate to alter, the guideline rates for general damages in personal injury actions.

General damages in England and Wales were increased by 10% for all cases where judgements were given after 1 April 2013, following changes to the options available to personal injury claimants wanting to cover the cost of their litigation. General damages are generally awarded only in claims brought by individuals, when they have suffered personal harm. Examples would be personal injury (following the tort of negligence by the defendant), or the tort of defamation.

The quantification of personal injury is not an exact science. Solicitors treat personal injury claims as "general damages" for pain and suffering and loss of amenity (PSLA). Solicitors quantify personal injury claims by reference to previous awards made by the courts which are "similar" to the case in hand. The Judicial College's Guidelines for the Assessment of General Damages in Personal Injury Cases are adjusted following periodic review of the awards which have been made by the courts since the previous review.

The guidance which solicitors will take into account to help quantify general damages include:

- The age of the client, which is important especially when dealing with fatal accident claims or permanent injuries. The younger the injured victim with a permanent injury the longer that person has to live with the PSLA. As a consequence, the greater the compensation payment. In fatal accident claims, generally the younger the deceased, the greater the dependency claim by the partner and children.
- The nature and extent of the injuries sustained: solicitors will consider "like for like" injuries with the case in hand and similar cases decided by the courts previously. These cases are known as precedents. Generally speaking decisions from the higher courts will bind the lower courts. Therefore, judgments from the House of Lords and the Court of Appeal have greater authority than the lower courts such as the High Court and the County Court. A compensation award can only be right or wrong with reference to that specific judgment. Solicitors must be careful when looking at older cases when quantifying a claim to ensure that the award is brought up to date and to take into account the court of appeal case in Heil v Rankin Generally speaking the greater the injury the greater the damages awarded.

Personal attributes and fortitude of the client: This heading is inextricably linked with the other points above. Where two clients are of the same age, experience and suffer the same injury, it does not necessarily mean that they will be affected the same. We are all different. Some people will recover more quickly than others. The courts will assess each claim on its own particular facts and therefore if one claimant recovers more quickly than another, the damages will be reflected accordingly. "Psychological injuries" may also follow from an accident which may increase the quantum of damages.

When a personal injury claim is settled either in court or out of court, the most common way the compensation payment is made is by a lump sum award in full and final settlement of the claim. Once accepted there can be no further award for compensation at a later time unless the claim is settled by provisional damages often found in industrial injury claims such as asbestos related injuries.

== Statutory damages ==
Statutory damages is an amount stipulated within the statute rather than calculated based on the degree of harm to the plaintiff. Lawmakers will provide for statutory damages for acts in which it is difficult to determine the value of the harm to the victim. Mere violation of the law can entitle the victim to a statutory award, even if no actual injury occurred. These are different from nominal damages, in which no written sum is specified.

== Nominal damages ==
Nominal damages are very small damages awarded in recognition that, while the offence complained of has been committed, the loss or harm suffered was technical rather than actual. A famous US nominal damages award in modern times was the US$1 verdict against the National Football League (NFL) in the 1986 antitrust suit prosecuted by the United States Football League. Although the verdict was automatically trebled pursuant to antitrust law in the United States, the resulting $3 judgment was effectively a victory for the NFL. Historically, one of the best-known nominal damages awards was the farthing—the smallest denomination of currency—awarded to James Whistler in his libel suit against John Ruskin. In the English jurisdiction, nominal damages are often set at £5, and were sometimes set at a farthing before the coin was abolished.

Many times a party that has been wronged but is not able to prove significant damages will sue for nominal damages. This is particularly common in the United States in cases involving alleged violations of constitutional rights, such as freedom of speech. Until 2021 there was a circuit split as to whether nominal damages could be awarded if a constitutional violation had occurred that had since been rendered moot. The Supreme Court of the United States decided 8–1 in Uzuegbunam v. Preczewski that nominal damages are an appropriate means to redress a violation of rights that had been rendered moot.

=== Contemptuous damages ===
Contemptuous damages are a form of damage award available in some jurisdictions. They are similar to nominal damages as they are given when the plaintiff's suit is trivial, used only to settle a point of honor or law. Awards are usually of the smallest denomination of currency, such as one cent or one half penny (as awarded in England in Dering v Uris and the case of the "spanking colonel" John Elliott Brooks). (Note: Brooks, who was actually a lieutenant-colonel rather than a full colonel (as well as a former mayor and a solicitor), sued IPC Newspapers after its Sunday People title accused him of being "a menace to young girls" by luring young women onto his cabin cruiser under the pretext that they would get to crew it and then assaulting them; one woman who appeared in the article said that Brooks had spanked her bare bottom thirty times. Brooks admitted that he was inviting women onto his boat for his personal enjoyment, spanking included, but denied beating them and insisted that they had given their full consent.) The key distinction between nominal and contemptuous damages is that in jurisdictions that follow the principle that the losing party pays the winner's legal fees, the losing claimant in a contemptuous damages case may be required to pay their own fees. Court costs are not awarded.

== Punitive damages (non-compensatory) ==
Generally punitive damages, termed exemplary damages in the United Kingdom, are not awarded in order to compensate the plaintiff but in order to reform or deter the defendant and similar persons from pursuing a course of action such as that which damaged the plaintiff. Punitive damages are awarded only in special cases where conduct was egregiously insidious and are over and above the amount of compensatory damages, such as in the event of malice or intent. Great judicial restraint is expected to be exercised in their application. In the United States punitive damages awards are subject to the limitations imposed by the due process of law clauses of the Fifth and Fourteenth Amendments to the United States Constitution.

In England and Wales, exemplary damages are limited to the circumstances set out by Lord Devlin in the leading case of Rookes v. Barnard. They are:

1. Oppressive, arbitrary or unconstitutional actions by the servants of government.
2. Where the defendant's conduct was 'calculated' to make a profit for himself.
3. Where a statute expressly authorises the same.

Rookes v Barnard has been much criticized and has not been followed in Canada or Australia or by the Privy Council.

Punitive damages awarded elsewhere may not be recognised by a European court, where punitive damages are likely to be considered to violate ordre public.

=== Aggravated damages ===
Some jurisdictions recognize "aggravated damages", similar to punitive or exemplary damages but in cases where the injury has been aggravated by the wrongdoer's behaviour, for example, by cruelty. Aggravated damages are not often awarded.

== Restitutionary or disgorgement damages ==
In certain areas of the law another head of damages has long been available, whereby the defendant is made to give up the profits made through the civil wrong in restitution. Doyle and Wright define restitutionary damages as being a monetary remedy that is measured according to the defendant's gain rather than the plaintiff's loss. The plaintiff thereby gains damages which are not measured by reference to any loss sustained. In some areas of the law this heading of damages is uncontroversial; most particularly intellectual property rights and breach of fiduciary relationship. The basis for restitutionary damages is much debated, but is usually seen as based on denying a wrongdoer any profit from his wrongdoing. It is challenging to determine and codify which kinds of wrongs are suitable for the application of this remedy.

In England and Wales the House of Lords case of Attorney-General v. Blake opened up the possibility of restitutionary damages for breach of contract. In this case the profits made by a defecting spy, George Blake, for the publication of his book, were awarded to the British Government for breach of contract. The case has been followed in English courts, but the situations in which restitutionary damages will be available remain unclear.

== Legal costs ==
In addition to damages, the successful party is often entitled to be awarded their reasonable legal costs that they spent during the case. This is the rule in most countries other than the United States. In the United States, a party generally is not entitled to its attorneys' fees or for hardships undergone during trial unless the parties agreed in a contract that attorney's fees should be covered or a specific statute or law permits recovery of legal fees, such as discrimination.

== See also ==
- Arbitration award
- Bad faith
- Fine (penalty)
- Hand formula
- Measure of Damages (under English law)
- Non-economic damages caps
- Restorative justice
- Subrogation
- Reparations (transitional justice)
- Legal remedy
- Reparation (legal)
- Reparations
- War reparations
- Reparations for slavery
