= Ruxley Electronics and Construction Ltd v Forsyth =

1995 English contract law case

Ruxley Electronics Ltd v Forsyth
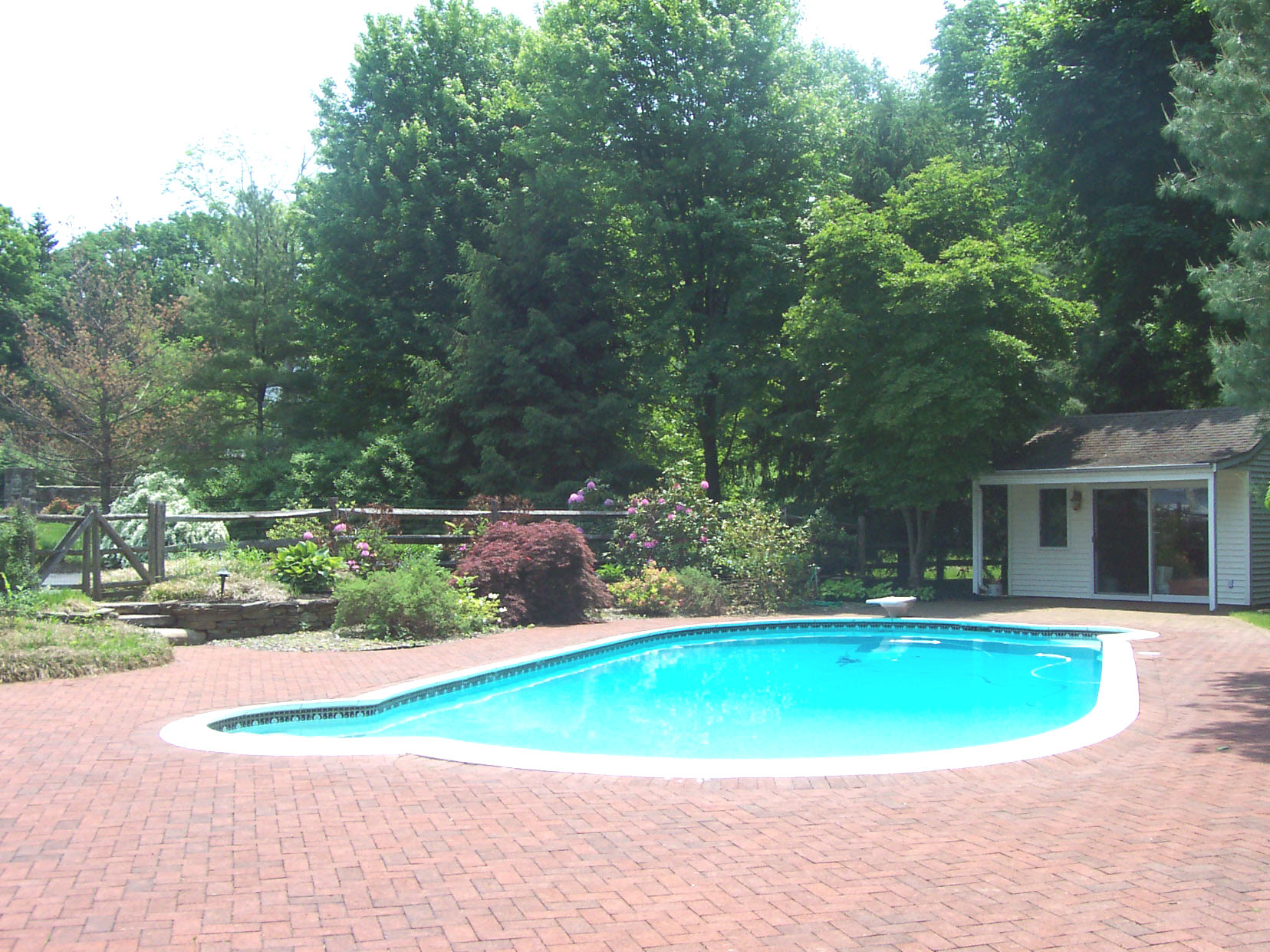
- Court: House of Lords
- Decided: 29 June 1995
- Citations: [1995] UKHL 8, [1996] AC 344

Court membership
- Judges sitting: Lord Keith of Kinkel, Lord Bridge of Harwich, Lord Jauncey of Tullichettle, Lord Mustill, Lord Lloyd of Berwick

Keywords
- Loss of amenity, cost of cure

Ruxley Electronics and Construction Ltd v Forsyth [1995] UKHL 8 is an English contract law case, concerning the choice between an award of damages for the cost of curing a defect in a building contract or (when that is unreasonable) for awarding damages for loss of "amenity".

== Facts ==
Ruxley agreed to build a swimming pool in Forsyth's garden. The contract specified that the pool would have a diving area seven feet, six inches deep. When constructed, the diving area was only six feet deep. This was still a safe depth for diving and one which did not affect value of the pool. Forsyth was not happy, however, and he brought an action for breach of contract claiming the cost of having a pool demolished and rebuilt (the cost of cure), a sum of £21,540.

At first instance the judge rejected the claim for 'cost of cure' damages on the ground that it was an unreasonable claim in the circumstances, but awarded Forsyth 'loss of amenity damages' of £2,500. This award was reversed by the Court of Appeal which held that damages should be awarded at the amount required to place Forsyth in the same position as he would have been in had the contract been performed, which in the circumstances was the cost of rebuilding the pool. Ruxley appealed to the House of Lords.

== Judgment ==
The House of Lords allowed the appeal and upheld the judge's award of £2,500 for loss of amenity. Lord Mustill said ‘the law must cater for those occasions where the value of the promise to the promisee exceeds the financial enhancement of his position which full performance will secure.’ So ‘consumer surplus’ was recognised in an award for breach of contract. To award them nothing would be to say the promise was illusory, and that was unsatisfactory. But correcting was too expensive, and too much for the loss of Mr Forsyth. It would be contrary to ‘common sense’ and unreasonable. So we must look to ‘the loss truly suffered by the promisee’.

a common feature of small building works performed on residential property that the cost of the work is not fully reflected by an increase in the market value of the house, and that comparatively minor deviations from specification or sound workmanship may have no direct financial effect at all.

Lord Lloyd said that though courts do not care what damages will be used for, the intention of the innocent party for what he does with them may be relevant to the issue of reasonableness in awarding damages.

== See also ==
- English contract law
- Addis v Gramophone Co Ltd [1909] AC 488
- Jarvis v Swans Tours Ltd [1973] QB 233, [1973] 1 All ER 71, where purpose of contract to obtain some mental satisfaction
- Jackson v Horizon Holidays Ltd, [1975] 3 All ER 92
- Johnson v Gore Wood & Co [2002] 2 AC 1, 49, (a case actually concerning "reflective loss" in UK company law) it was said contract breaking is an ‘incident of commercial life which players in the game are expected to meet with mental fortitude’
- Peevyhouse v. Garland Coal & Mining Co., 382 P.2d 109 (Okl. 1962)
- Tito v Waddell (No 2) [1977] Ch 106
