= Addis v Gramophone Co Ltd =

English contract law and UK labour law case

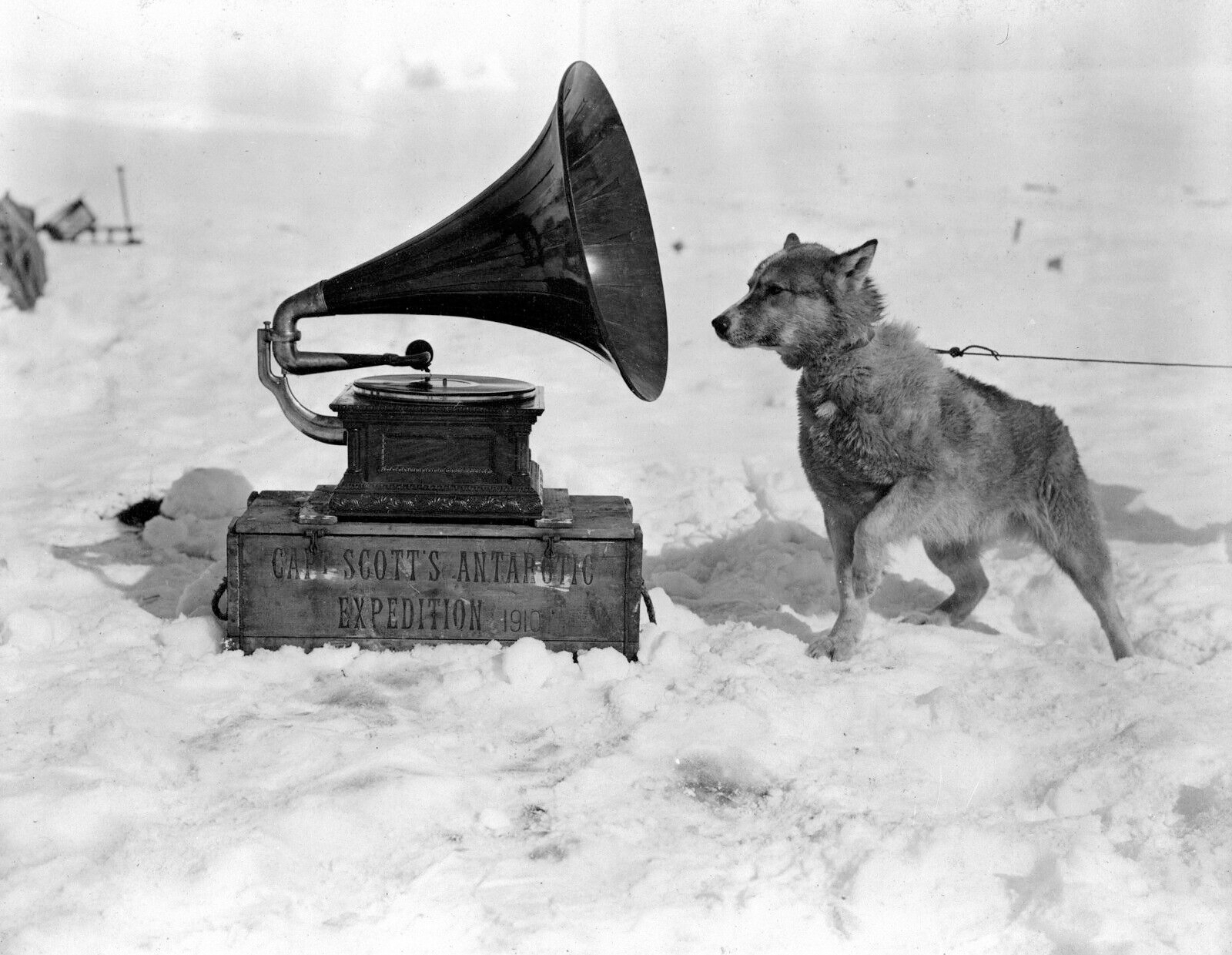
- Court: House of Lords
- Decided: 26 July 1909
- Citation: [1909] UKHL 1, [1909] AC 488
- Transcript: Full text of judgment

Court membership
- Judges sitting: Lord Loreburn LC; Lord James of Hereford; Lord Atkinson; Lord Collins; Lord Gorell; Lord Shaw of Dunfermline

Keywords
- breach of contract; wrongful dismissal

Addis v Gramophone Co Ltd [1909] AC 488 is an old English contract law and UK labour law case, which used to restrict damages for non-pecuniary losses for breach of contract.

== Facts ==
Mr Addis was Gramophone’s manager in Calcutta. In October 1905, he was given six months' notice of dismissal as legally required and a successor was appointed. However, Gramophone also immediately took steps during this six-month period to prevent Addis acting as manager, resulting in Addis leaving his job two months later and returning to England. This was humiliating. The jury awarded Addis £340 for loss of commissions and £600 for wrongful dismissal. Could there be damages for the manner of dismissal?

The Court of Appeal had allowed damages for the manner of the dismissal.

=== Submissions ===
Duke KC and Groser, for the appellant.

The appellant was wrongfully dismissed, and the jury in awarding damages were entitled to take into consideration the circumstances of the dismissal. There has been a development of the law in respect of the measure of damages. In Marzetti v Williams the action was for the dishonour of a cheque and the plaintiff was held entitled only to nominal damages, but Lord Tenterden C.J. said: "It is a discredit and therefore injurious in fact to have a draft refused payment for so small a sum." In Rolin v Steward the damages awarded in a similar case were "not nominal or excessive damages, but reasonable and temperate damages." Emmens v Elderton was a case of wrongful dismissal of a solicitor whom a company engaged "to retain and employ" at 100l. a year. It was held that the engagement was for not less than a year. In French v Brookes the engagement was for three years with a right to dismiss on one year's notice, and the damages were assessed at one year's salary. In Maw v Jones an apprentice who was engaged at weekly wages was summarily dismissed. The damages were held not to be confined to one week's wages. The measure of the damages is the whole loss sustained by the appellant, and the verdict of the jury in this case was reasonable.

Lush KC (Schiller with him), for the respondents.

There was in fact no wrongful dismissal, but if there were, the damages could not exceed the immediate pecuniary loss which the plaintiff sustained by the breach of contract. No damages can be awarded for loss of reputation or for hurt feelings or for the difficulty in finding employment caused by the dismissal. The case of a banker refusing to honour a cheque when he has funds is peculiar and not relevant to the point here raised. So with actions for breach of promise to marry. Maw v Jones is contrary to established principles and was wrongly decided.

== Judgment ==
Lord Loreburn held that £600 was not allowed, that he could only recover his six-month salary and no more. At 491 he said,

If there be a dismissal without notice the employer must pay an indemnity; but that indemnity cannot include compensation either for the injured feelings of the servant...

Lord Collins dissented. Lord Atkinson said the case was in fact about libel.

Lord Loreburn LC

My Lords, this is a most unfortunate litigation, in which the costs must far exceed any sum there may be at stake. A little common sense would have settled all these differences in a few minutes.

The plaintiff was employed by the defendants as manager of their business at Calcutta at 15l. per week as salary, and a commission on the trade done. He could be dismissed by six months' notice.

In October, 1905, the defendants gave him six months' notice, but at the same time they appointed Mr. Gilpin to act as his successor, and took steps to prevent the plaintiff from acting any longer as manager. In December, 1905, the plaintiff came back to England.

The plaintiff brought this action in 1906, claiming an account and damages for breach of contract. That there was a breach of contract is quite clear. If what happened in October, 1905, did not amount to a wrongful dismissal, it was, at all events, a breach of the plaintiff's right to act as manager during the six months and to earn the best commission he could make.

When the action came to trial it was agreed to refer the matters of account to arbitration. The causes of action for breach of contract were tried by Darling J. and a jury. The jury found for the plaintiff in respect of wrongful dismissal 600l., and 340l. in respect of excess commission over and above what was earned by the plaintiff's successor between October, 1905, and April, 1906.

The Court of Appeal by a majority held that upon their view of the facts there was (apart from the account which must be taken) no cause of action, and they entered judgment for the defendants.

As to the damages of 600l. for wrongful dismissal a variety of controversies arose. Did what happened entitle the plaintiff to treat the breach of contract as a wrongful dismissal? If yes, then did he elect to treat the contract of service as still continuing? Was it open to the defendants to raise the point having regard to the pleadings and the amendments to the pleadings, and the way the case was conducted al the trial, and the contents of the notice of appeal to the Court of Appeal? A subsidiary dispute was raised as to the way in which the case had been in fact conducted at the trial, as to which eminent counsel did not agree. A further controversy ensued, whether the 600l. was intended to include salary for the six months, or merely damages because of the abrupt and oppressive way in which the plaintiff's services were discontinued, and the loss he sustained from the discredit thus thrown upon him. And, finally, a question of law was argued, whether or not such damages could be recovered in law.

My Lords, it is difficult to imagine a better illustration of the way in which litigation between exasperated litigants can breed barren controversies and increase costs in a matter of itself simple enough.

To my mind it signifies nothing in the present case whether the claim is to be treated as for wrongful dismissal or not. In any case there was a breach of contract in not allowing the plaintiff to discharge his duties as manager, and the damages are exactly the same in either view. They are, in my opinion, the salary to which the plaintiff was entitled for the six months between October, 1905, and April, 1906, together with the commission which the jury think he would have earned had he been allowed to manage the business himself. I cannot agree that the manner of dismissal affects these damages. Such considerations have never been allowed to influence damages in this kind of case. An expression of Lord Coleridge CJ has been quoted as authority to the contrary (Maw v Jones). I doubt if the learned Lord Chief Justice so intended it. If he did I cannot agree with him.

If there be a dismissal without notice the employer must pay an indemnity; but that indemnity cannot include compensation either for the injured feelings of the servant, or for the loss he may sustain from the fact that his having been dismissed of itself makes it more difficult for him to obtain fresh employment. The cases relating to a refusal by a banker to honour cheques when he has funds in hand have, in my opinion, no bearing. That class of case has always been regarded as exceptional. And the rule as to damages in wrongful dismissal, or in breach of contract to allow a man to continue in a stipulated service, has always been, I believe, what I have stated. It is too inveterate to be now altered, even if it were desirable to alter it.

Accordingly I think that so much of the verdict of 600l. as relates to that head of damages cannot be allowed to stand. As there is an additional dispute how much of it does relate to that head of damages, the best course will be to disallow the 600l. altogether, and to state in the order that plaintiff is entitled to be credited, in the account which is to be taken, with salary from October, 1905, to April, 1906.

As to the 340l. I think there was evidence on which the jury were entitled to find that the plaintiff could have earned more commission if he had been allowed to remain as manager.

In the result I respectfully advise your Lordships to order judgment for the plaintiff for 340l., with a declaration that he is entitled to be credited, in the account now under investigation, with salary from October, 1905, to April, 1906, and with all commission on business actually done during that period which he would have been entitled to receive if he had been acting as manager.

In regard to costs, both sides have raised points which ought not to have been raised, but I think the defendants acted oppressively in detaining the plaintiff's securities. The plaintiff has succeeded in recovering a substantial sum, and the judgment in his favour should be with costs here and below.

Lord James of Hereford.

My Lords, I concur in the entirety of the judgment delivered by my noble and learned friend on the woolsack, but I wish to add a few words as to the claim for damages on the ground that there has been an aggravation of the injury in consequence of the manner of dismissal.

My Lords, that raises a question whether in an action of contract there can be such damages as those to which I have referred. The reason I wish to add one or two words is because I know that my noble and learned friend (Lord Collins) entertains the view that such damages are recoverable. As to that I must say that I regret I cannot join with him in that view. I have read the judgment of my noble and learned friend and endeavoured to give the fullest consideration to it, and yet I do not see, either from authority or from the reasoning which is to be found in that judgment, that such damages can be recovered in an action of contract.

My Lords, I may say if I had arrived at a different conclusion I should have been subjected to some feeling of remorse, because during many years when I was a junior at the Bar, when I was drawing pleadings, I often strove to convert a breach of contract into a tort in order to recover a higher scale of damages, it having been then as it is now, I believe, the general impression of the profession that such damages cannot be recovered in an action of contract as distinguished from tort, and therefore it was useless to attempt to recover them in such a case. That view, which I was taught early to understand was the law in olden days, remains true to this day. Therefore I feel bound to say, for the reason I have given, that I concur in that portion of the Lord Chancellor's judgment as well as the rest.

Lord Atkinson.

My Lords, I entirely concur with the judgment of my noble and learned friend on the woolsack. Much of the difficulty which has arisen in this case is due to the unscientific form in which the pleadings, as amended, have been framed, and the loose manner in which the proceedings at the trial were conducted.

The rights of the plaintiff, disembarrassed of the confusing methods by which they were sought to be enforced, are, in my opinion, clear. He had been illegally dismissed from his employment. He could have been legally dismissed by the six months' notice, which he, in fact, received, but the defendants did not wait for the expiry of that period. The damages plaintiff sustained by this illegal dismissal were (1.) the wages for the period of six months during which his formal notice would have been current; (2.) the profits or commission which would, in all reasonable probability, have been earned by him during the six months had he continued in the employment; and possibly (3.) damages in respect of the time which might reasonably elapse before he could obtain other employment. He has been awarded a sum possibly of some hundreds of pounds, not in respect of any of these heads of damage, but in respect of the harsh and humiliating way in which he was dismissed, including, presumably, the pain he experienced by reason, it is alleged, of the imputation upon him conveyed by the manner of his dismissal. This is the only circumstance which makes the case of general importance, and this is the only point I think it necessary to deal with.

I have been unable to find any case decided in this country in which any countenance is given to the notion that a dismissed employee can recover in the shape of exemplary damages for illegal dismissal, in effect damages for defamation, for it amounts to that, except the case of Maw v Jones.

In that case Mathew J, as he then was, during the argument, while counsel was urging, on the authority of Hartley v Harman, that the measure of damages for the improper dismissal of an ordinary domestic servant was a month's wages and nothing more, no doubt interjected in the shape of a question the remark, "Have you ever heard that principle applied to a case where a false charge of misconduct has been made?" But the decision was that the direction of the judge at the trial was right.

Now, what was the character of that direction? The defendant had power to dismiss his apprentice, the plaintiff, on a week's notice, and had also power to dismiss him summarily if he should shew a want of interest in his work. He dismissed the apprentice summarily without notice, assigning as a reason that he had been guilty of frequent acts of insubordination and that he had gone out at night without leave.

The judge at the trial told the jury that they were not bound to limit the damages to the week's notice he had lost, but that they might take into consideration the time the plaintiff would require to get new employment—the difficulty he would have as a discharged apprentice in getting employment elsewhere—and it was on this precise ground the direction was upheld. I do not think that this case is any authority whatever for the general proposition that exemplary damages may be recovered for wrongful dismissal, still less, of course, for breach of contract generally; but, such as it is, it is the only authority in the shape of a decided case which can be found upon the first-mentioned point.

I have always understood that damages for breach of contract were in the nature of compensation, not punishment, and that the general rule of law applicable to such cases was that in effect stated by Cockburn CJ in Engel v Fitch in these words:

"By the law of England as a general rule a vendor who from whatever cause fails to perform his contract is bound, as was said by Lord Wensleydale in the case referred to, to place the purchaser, so far as money will do it, in the position he would have been in if the contract had been performed. If a man sells a cargo of goods not yet come to hand, but which he believes to have been consigned to him from abroad, and the goods fail to arrive, it will be no answer to the intended purchaser to say that a third party who had engaged to consign the goods to the seller has deceived or disappointed him. The purchaser will be entitled to the difference between the contract price and the market price."

In Sikes v Wild Lord Blackburn says:

"I do not sea how the existence of misconduct can alter the rule of law by which damages for breach of contract are to be assessed. It may render the contract voidable on the ground of fraud or give a cause of action for deceit, but surely it cannot alter the effect of the contract itself."

There are three well-known exceptions to the general rule applicable to the measure of damages for breach of contract, namely, actions against a banker for refusing to pay a customer's cheque when he has in his hands funds of the customer's to meet it, actions for breach of promise of marriage, and actions like that in Flureau v Thornhill, where the vendor of real estate, without any fault on his part, fails to make title. I know of none other.

The peculiar nature of the first two of these exceptions justified their existence. Ancient practice upholds the last, though it has often been adversely criticized, as in Bain v Fothergill. If there be a tendency to create a fourth exception it ought, in my view, to be checked rather than stimulated; inasmuch as to apply in their entirety the principles on which damages are measured in tort to cases of damages for breaches of contract would lead to confusion and uncertainty in commercial affairs, while to apply them only in part and in particular cases would create anomalies, lead occasionally to injustice, and make the law a still more "lawless science" than it is said to be.

For instance, in actions of tort motive, if it may be taken into account to aggregate damages, as it undoubtedly may be, may also be taken into account to mitigate them, as may also the conduct of the plaintiff himself who seeks redress. Is this rule to be applied to actions of breach of contract? There are few breaches of contract more common than those which arise where men omit or refuse to repay what they have borrowed, or to pay for what they have bought. Is the creditor or vendor who sues for one of such breaches to have the sum he recovers lessened if he should be shewn to be harsh, grasping, or pitiless, or even insulting, in enforcing his demand, or lessened because the debtor has struggled to pay, has failed because of misfortune, and has been suave, gracious, and apologetic in his refusal? On the other hand, is that sum to be increased if it should be shewn that the debtor could have paid readily without any embarrassment, but refused with expression of contempt and contumely, from a malicious desire to injure his creditor?

Few parties to contracts have more often to complain of ingratitude and baseness than sureties. Are they, because of this, to be entitled to recover from the principal, often a trusted friend, who has deceived and betrayed them, more than they paid on that principal's behalf? If circumstances of aggravation are rightly to be taken into account in actions of contract st all, why should they not be taken into account in the case of the surety, and the rules and principles applicable to cases of tort applied to the full extent?

In many other cases of breach of contract there may be circumstances of malice, fraud, defamation, or violence, which would sustain an action of tort as an alternative remedy to an action for breach of contract. If one should select the former mode of redress, he may, no doubt, recover exemplary damages, or what is sometimes styled vindictive damages; but if he should choose to seek redress in the form of an action for breach of contract, he lets in all the consequences of that form of action: Thorpe v Thorpe. One of these consequences is, I think, this: that he is to be paid adequate compensation in money for the loss of that which he would have received had his contract been kept, and no more.

I can conceive nothing more objectionable and embarrassing in litigation than trying in effect an action of libel or slander as a matter of aggravation in an action for illegal dismissal, the defendant being permitted, as he must in justice be permitted, to traverse the defamatory sense, rely on privilege, or raise every point which he could raise in an independent action brought for the alleged libel or slander itself.

In my opinion, exemplary damages ought not to be, and are not according to any true principle of law, recoverable in such an action as the present, and the sums awarded to the plaintiff should therefore be decreased by the amount at which they have been estimated, and credit for that item should not be allowed in his account.

Lord Collins.

My Lords, the question which at the close of the argument I desired time to consider was whether in an action for wrongful dismissal the jury, in assessing the damages, are debarred from taking into their consideration circumstances of harshness and oppression accompanying the dismissal and any loss sustained by the plaintiff from the discredit thus thrown upon him. The jury in this case obviously did take these circumstances into consideration, for they assessed the damages at 600l. The contention of the defendants is that the damages must be limited to the salary to which the plaintiff was entitled for the six months between October, 1905, and April, 1906, together with the commission which the jury should think he would have earned had he been allowed to manage the business himself; that the manner of the dismissal itself has never been allowed and ought not to be allowed to influence damages in this kind of case. This contention goes the length of affirming that in cases of wrongful dismissal it is beyond the competence of a jury to give what are called exemplary or vindictive damages, and it was this point that I desired to consider further.

No English case was cited which in terms decides this point against the plaintiff, and I have been unable to find one myself, though I am aware that Mr. Sedgwick, in his treatise on Damages (8th ed.), contends for that view. It is, however, quite clear, I think, and Mr. Sedgwick apparently does not dispute it, that at one time it was competent for juries to give such damages. "In one case as late as the reign of James the First," he says at s. 19, "it is said ‘the jury are chancellors’ and they can give such damages as ‘the case requires in equity’ as if they had the absolute control of the subject." At ss. 348, 349, he goes on, "Until comparatively recent times juries were as arbitrary judges of the amount of the damages as of the facts." "This principle applied as well to actions of contract as of tort." "Even as late as the time of Lord Mansfield it was possible for counsel to state the law to be that the Court cannot measure the ground on which the jury find damages." He says, in s. 351, in breach of promise of marriage cases the jury were told that they could give damages "for example's sake to prevent such offences in future." He says, in s. 352, vindictive damages or smart money could be given whether the form of action were trespass or case. At s. 354, on the right to give such damages, he says:

"The doctrine is to be supported mainly on the grounds of authority and convenience. The historical facts shew that it has its roots in that jealousy of the exercise of arbitrary and malicious power to which the jury in our system of law has always been so keenly alive, and if it is an anomalous survival of a part of the old rule that the jury were judges of the damages, it must be inferred that it has survived because of its inherent usefulness."

Having thus explained and vindicated the right of juries to give exemplary damages, "for example's sake and to prevent such offences in future," he nevertheless in other parts of his work seeks to put upon it an arbitrary and illogical limitation by confining it to actions in form of tort, as though a breach of contract, which of course is in itself an actionable wrong, might not be committed with accompanying circumstances just as deserving the reprobation of a jury as those which might accompany the commission of a trespass. The rule with regard to remoteness of damage is precisely the same in actions of contract or of tort: see Pollock on Torts, 8th ed., p. 558, citing Brett M.R. in the Notting Hill Case.

But it is from the standpoint of a difference in principle in the measure of damages in cases of contract and of tort that he ventures to impugn the position taken up by the late Mr. Chitty in the early editions of his well-known work on Contracts, a position which has been adopted by all subsequent editors, and is again asserted in the last (the 14th) edition of 1904. In the 1834 edition Mr. Chitty says: "There are instances in which the defendant may be regarded in the light of a wrong-doer in breaking his contract, and in such cases a greater latitude is allowed to the jury in assessing the damages." And he cites Lord Sondes v Fletcher, decided in 1822. There the plaintiff had presented the defendant to the living of Kettering, taking from him a bond to resign it when either of two named persons should be capable of taking the same. The defendant, although requested, refused to resign. The defendant's life interest was worth ten years' purchase. The life interest of one of the two persons named, whom the plaintiff intended to appoint, was worth fourteen years' purchase. At the trial before Abbott C.J. the jury found a verdict for the latter amount. On motion for a new trial, on the ground that the measure of damages was the amount by which the plaintiff was prejudiced in the value of the advowson, i.e., the value of the defendant's life interest, and that in estimating the annual value of the living the curate's stipend ought to have been deducted, the Court held that the defendant, having entered into a bond to do a particular thing which he had refused to do, was a wrongdoer, and that he was not to be permitted to estimate the value of the living as if he were the purchaser of it, and that they were not prepared to say that the jury had formed a wrong estimate of the damages. The judges who usually sat in banc at that time were Abbott C.J. and Bayley, Holroyd, and Best JJ. Thus we have the opinion of four eminent English judges as late as 1822, notwithstanding the fact that in form the action was for breach of contract only, sanctioning the award of exemplary damages.

It is true that Mr. Sedgwick impugns Mr. Chitty's position, but he has to admit that the Courts of North and South Carolina, whose high authority he acknowledges, have laid the law down in a sense contrary to his (Mr. Sedgwick's) contention. Again, as late as 1849, on a question whether the damages given by a jury in a case of wrongful dismissal were excessive, no less distinguished a judge than Maule J., with whose judgment Cresswell J. and Wilde C.J. expressly concurred, said: "I also think there is no ground for saying the damages were mis-computed. It must be borne in mind that embezzlement was imputed to the plaintiff." Doubtless there are other dicta to the same effect scattered through the reports, some of which were cited by Mr. Duke; indeed, it could hardly fail to be so in view of the authorities which I have cited and the absence of any decided case to the contrary; at the same time it was quite possible that the strong opinion of so distinguished a text-writer as Mr. Sedgwick might lead casual readers to forget that the law of England was once clearly established to the contrary. But it does so happen that the only authority in recent times on the point is the case of Maw v Jones, decided in 1890, which in terms decides that a false charge may aggravate the damages in a case of wrongful dismissal.

This case has the authority of Manisty J, as well as of Lord Coleridge CJ and Mathew J., by whom his ruling to that effect was upheld. Lord Coleridge CJ pointed out that dismissal with an imputation might well be thought by a jury to hurt the plaintiff's prospects of finding another situation, and on that ground alone might give a legal claim to consequential damages within the ordinary rule.

Counsel for the defendant argued that this case stood alone and was quite an exception in our law and ought to be overruled; and the like observation was made as to the exceptional character of actions for breach of promise of marriage where it is admitted that such damages may be properly given. Dealing with this incident of breach of promise cases, Sir Frederick Pollock in his Treatise on the Law of Torts, 8th ed., 1908, says at p. 560, "like results might conceivably follow in the case of other breaches of contract accompanied with circumstances of wanton injury or contumely"; and see the observations of Willes J. in Bell v Midland Ry Co But when the law of damages is traced backwards, it will be found that the so-called exceptions, including that of dishonoured cheques, are merely recurrences to the old rule, which, it may be through the deference paid by our own text-writers to Mr. Sedgwick's opinion, has been sometimes forgotten or ignored. But, for the reason I have given, I think we are not bound to disallow such damages in this case, and I am not disposed, unless compelled by authority to do so, to curtail the power of the jury to exercise what, as Mr. Sedgwick points out, is a salutary power, which has justified itself in practical experience, to redress wrongs for which there may be, as in this case, no other remedy. Such discretion, when exercised by a jury, would be subject to the now unquestioned rights of the Courts to supervise, just as is done every day, where the form of action is tort. That a trespass carrying with it an imputation may be the subject of exemplary damages swelled by the fact of the imputation was decided by Lord Ellenborough in Bracegirdle v Orford, overruling the contention that the imputation could only be brought into consideration as the subject for a separate count for slander.

In all other respects I agree in the opinion of the Lord Chancellor.

Lord Gorell.

My Lords, in this case the legal point arises whether in the plaintiff's action for breach of contract to employ him the defendants can be made liable, in addition to damages for the loss to the plaintiff of the benefit of the contract, for damages for the manner in which the contract has been put an end to. The general rule is clear that damages in contract must be such as flow naturally from the breach, or such as may be supposed to have been in the contemplation of the parties as the result of the breach. The latter branch of the rule is inapplicable to the facts of this case, for it was not even suggested that there were any consequential damages within the contemplation of the parties. Under the first branch of this rule the plaintiff recovers the net benefit of having the contract performed. He is therefore to be put in the same position as if the contract had been performed. If it had been performed, he would have had certain salary and commission. He loses that, and must be compensated for it. But I am unable to find either authority or principle for the contention that he is entitled to have damages for the manner in which his discharge took place. According to my view, none of the cases which counsel for the appellant cited established the proposition for which he contended.

The case of Maw v Jones, which was relied on, does not, when examined, support the contention. The plaintiff has attempted to suggest that the manner of his dismissal has cast a slur upon his character, and has really endeavoured to claim damages for defamation and to turn the action for the loss of the benefit of the contract into an action of tort, with the result of attempting to give the jury a discretion uncontrolled by the true consideration, namely, what is the money loss to the plaintiff of losing the benefit of the contract?

I consider, further, that there was nothing in the manner of the plaintiff's dismissal which was different in any legal sense from what would have been the case if his employment had been terminated at the end of the six months. At that time his authority as agent and at the bank would have come to an end and been notified, and his successor would take his place. This was done six months sooner than the defendants had a right to act.

In my opinion the verdict for 600l. cannot in the circumstances stand.

With regard to the 340l. for extra commission, the plaintiff's right to this depends upon whether there was evidence which the jury were entitled to consider to shew that had he remained agent for the six months he would have been able to earn more profits for the agency than were actually earned. Having studied the evidence with care, I have come to the conclusion that there was some evidence upon the point, and I think the jury were entitled to act upon it if they thought fit.

As to the remaining points I do not think it necessary to add anything to the observations of the Lord Chancellor, and I concur in the judgment which he proposes.

Lord Shaw of Dunfermline.

My Lords, it is impossible to deny the impressiveness and value of the citation of authority made by my noble and learned friend Lord Collins, and I am much moved by his definite opinion that the verdict is consistent with the practice of the law of England. But as the rest of your Lordships do not agree that the matter is concluded by authority or practice, I am willing and free to state my reckoning of the question as one of principle. So considered, the matter appears to me to stand in the following position. There can be no doubt that wrongful dismissal may be effected in circumstances and accompanied by words and acts importing an obloquy and causing an injury, any reasonable estimate of which in money would far outreach the balance of emolument due under the contract. This is within the range of ordinary as well as professional experience. And I admit the highest regard for that judicial opinion which leans towards such a perfecting of the legal instrument as to enable it to provide a remedy in complete equation with the wrong suffered. There, however, my concurrence with that opinion stops, and I cannot carry it forward to what, in my view, would be a disregard of the limitations of the instrument itself. The present type of case—wrongful dismissal—provides a convenient illustration of both aspects of the position. Suppose, my Lords, that slander or libel accompanies the dismissal, nothing, as I understand, is here decided to the effect that the slander or libel, which is cognizable by law as a good and separate ground of action, suffers either merger or extinction by reason of proceedings in respect of the breach of contract which such slander or libel accompanied. The law still provides a remedy. This seems perfectly just and very elementary, and I only state it because judges and text-writers appear not infrequently to have forgotten it. In the very decisions cited by Lord Collins in England the award of damages in respect of breach of the contract of service seems to have been improperly inflated by allowances made for "false charges," even a charge of embezzlement. I looked for possible assistance on this subject to the law of Scotland, but the same fallacy has taken some root in that country, a most eminent text-writer remarking, "In aggravated circumstances, e.g., where the master has calumniated the servant's character or injured his reputation, and so prevented his getting a new situation, damages to a much greater amount (than the whole emoluments, etc, due under the contract) might be given." My Lords, it is sufficient for me in answer to such dicta to repeat that slanders, and the like, which are in themselves cognizable by law as grounds of action, do not undergo the merger indicated, a merger which might produce prejudice and confusion; nor do they suffer extinction; the remedies therefore remain unaffected, and also separately available at law. I may add that I do not think that the citation from Pothier made by the last-named author strengthens his position, for when that great jurist says that, in addition to payment to the servant of the "whole year" of his services, the master "peut être condamné aux dommages et intérêts du domestique," he may only be referring to those commission perquisites and allowances which go to make up the full emoluments of the servant.

There remains, however, my Lords, a class of cases in which the injury accompanying the dismissal arises from causes less tangible, but still very real, circumstances involving harshness, oppression, and an accompaniment of obloquy. In these cases, unhappily, the limitations of the legal instrument do appear; these cases would not afford separate grounds of action because they are not cognizable by law. The very instance before your Lordships' House may afford an illustration. Here a successor to the plaintiff in a responsible post in India was appointed in this country, without previous notice given by the defendants; the successor enters the business premises to take, by their authority, out of the hands of the plaintiff those duties with which the defendants have by contract charged him, and he does so almost simultaneously with the notice of the defendants bringing the contract to a sudden termination; while, even before this notice reached his hands, the defendants' Indian bankers had been informed of the termination of the plaintiff's connection with and rights as representing their firm. Undeniably all this was a sharp and oppressive proceeding, importing in the commercial community of Calcutta possible obloquy and permanent loss. Yet, apart from the wrongful dismissal, and on the hypothesis that the defendants are to be held liable in the full amount of all the emoluments and allowances which would have been earned by the plaintiff but for the breach of contract, there seems nothing in these circumstances, singly or together, which would be recognized by the law as a separate ground of action. If there should be, it will, on the principle I have referred to, remain; but if there be not, I cannot see why acts otherwise non-actionable should become actionable or relevant as an aggravation of a breach of contract which, ex hypothesi, is already fully compensated. A certain regret which accompanies the conclusion which I have reached on the facts of this particular case is abated by the consciousness that the settlement by your Lordships' House of the important question of principle and practice may go some length in preventing the intrusion of not a few matters of prejudice hitherto introduced for the inflation of damages in cases of wrongful dismissal and now definitely declared to be irrelevant and inadmissible on that issue.

I concur in the judgment proposed by the Lord Chancellor.

== Significance ==
The case was met with immediate disapproval in a number of quarters. Sir Frederick Pollock, contrasted "an artificial rule or mere authority" to "the rationale of the matter":

In the case of wrongful dismissal, a harsh and humiliating way of doing it, by the imputation which such a dismissal conveys, may make it very difficult for the servant to obtain a new situation. That was how the court looked at it in Maw v Jones; not as a mere personal slight or affront. So in Addis v Gramophone Co Ltd the plaintiff was dismissed summarily from an important post in India, and the whole management taken out of his hands in a way which could not but import obloquy among the commercial community of India, and as a result permanent loss. It was no mere rudeness or want of consideration. But the majority of the House of Lords thought the damages in question were really for defamation, and could be recovered only in a separate action.

In 1997, Lord Steyn explained the current jurisprudence relating to the ratio of Addis in his judgment in Malik v Bank of Credit and Commerce International SA:

I would accept, however, that ... the majority apparently thought they were applying a special rule applicable to awards of damages for wrongful dismissal. It is, however, far from clear how far the ratio of Addis extends. It certainly enunciated the principle that an employee cannot recover exemplary or aggravated damages for wrongful dismissal. That is still sound law. The actual decision is only concerned with wrongful dismissal. It is therefore arguable that as a matter of precedent the ratio is so restricted. But it seems to me unrealistic not to acknowledge that Addis is authority for a wider principle. There is a common proposition in the speeches of the majority. That proposition is that damages for breach of contract may only be awarded for breach of contract, and not for loss caused by the manner of the breach. No Law Lord said that an employee may not recover financial loss for damage to his employment prospects caused by a breach of contract. And no Law Lord said that in breach of contract cases compensation for loss of reputation can never be awarded, or that it can only be awarded in cases falling in certain defined categories. Addis simply decided that the loss of reputation in that particular case could not be compensated because it was not caused by a breach of contract. So analysed Addis does not bar the claims put forward in the present case.

In 2001, Farley v Skinner further distinguished Addis, in holding that "the plaintiff's claim is not for injured feelings caused by the breach of contract. Rather it is a claim for damages flowing from the surveyor's failure to investigate and report, thereby depriving the buyer of the chance of making an informed choice whether or not to buy resulting in mental distress and disappointment."

== See also ==
Contract law cases

- Jarvis v Swans Tours Ltd [1973] 1 All ER 71
- Jackson v Horizon Holidays Ltd [1975] 3 All ER 92
- Ruxley Electronics Ltd v Forsyth [1995] UKHL 8
- Farley v Skinner [2000] UKHL 49
- Johnson v Gore Wood & Co [2002] 2 AC 1, 49, (a case actually concerning "reflective loss" in UK company law) it was said contract breaking is an ‘incident of commercial life which players in the game are expected to meet with mental fortitude’

Labour law cases

- Malik and Mahmud v Bank of Credit and Commerce International SA [1997] UKHL 23, [1998] AC 20; [1997] 3 All ER 1, [1997] IRLR 462, [1997] 3 WLR 95, [1997] ICR 606
- Johnson v Unisys Ltd [1998] EWCA Civ 1913, [2001] UKHL 13
- Eastwood v Magnox Electric plc [2002] EWCA Civ 463
