= Disappointment =

Feeling of dissatisfaction following the failure of an expectation to manifest

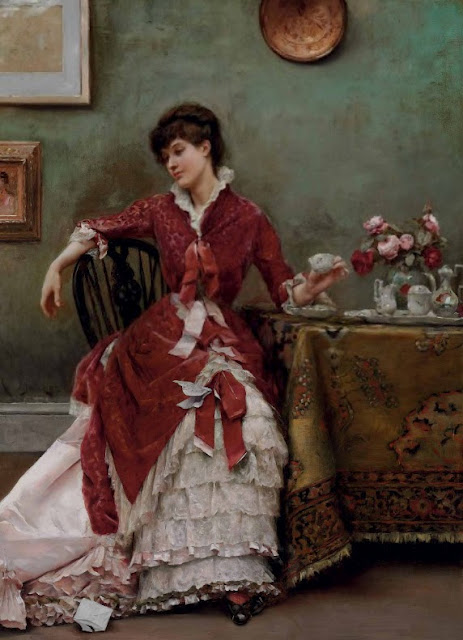
Disappointment (1882), by Julius LeBlanc Stewart

Disappointment is the feeling of dissatisfaction that follows the failure of expectations or hopes to manifest. Similar to regret, it differs in that a person who feels regret focuses primarily on the personal choices that contributed to a poor outcome, while a person feeling disappointment focuses on the outcome itself. It is a source of psychological stress. The study of disappointment—its causes, impact, and the degree to which individual decisions are motivated by a desire to avoid it—is a focus in the field of decision analysis, as disappointment is, along with regret, one of two primary emotions involved in decision-making.

== Etymology ==
Disappoint is traced to the Middle English disappointen by way of the Old French desapointer. In literal meaning, it is to remove from office. Its use in the sense of general frustration traces to the late 15th century, and it first appears recorded in English as an emotional state of dejection in the middle 18th century.

== Psychology ==
Disappointment is a subjective response related to anticipated rewards. Disappointment recovery time depends on the intensity of the disappointment, as well as the person experiencing the disappointment. For some it can take a few minutes while for others the same disappointment can take a few days.

Disappointment, and an inability to prepare for it, has also been hypothesized as the source of occasional immune system compromise in optimists. While optimists by and large exhibit better health, they may alternatively exhibit less immunity when under prolonged or uncontrollable stress, a phenomenon which researchers have attributed to the "disappointment effect". The "disappointment effect" posits that optimists do not utilize "emotional cushioning" to prepare for disappointment and hence are less able to deal with it when they experience it. This disappointment effect has been challenged since the mid-1990s by researcher Suzanne Segerstrom, who has published, alone and in accord, several articles evaluating its plausibility. Her findings suggest that, rather than being unable to deal with disappointment, optimists are more likely to actively tackle their problems and experience some immunity compromise as a result.

In 1994, psychotherapist Ian Craib published the book The Importance of Disappointment, in which he drew on the works of Melanie Klein and Sigmund Freud in advancing the theory that disappointment-avoidant culture—particularly therapy culture—provides false expectations of perfection in life and prevents people from achieving a healthy self-identity. Craib offered as two examples litigious victims of medical mistakes, who once would have accepted accidents as a course of life, and grieving people following the death of a loved one who, he said, are provided a false stage model of recovery that is more designed to comfort bereavement therapists than the bereaved.

Lacanians considered childhood disappointment essential to entry into the symbolic world of culture; disappointment in adulthood - the frustration of our demands by the world - as key to discovering who in fact we are.

== Law ==
Where goods or services have been purchased in the hope of some enjoyment and the delivery of the goods or services fails to generate the anticipated result, customers have at times sought damages for breach of contract on the grounds of disappointment and distress. Such damages are not generally allowed by the courts, but there are cases where an award for damages has been considered and agreed. English law cases include Jarvis v Swans Tours Ltd (1972) and Farley v Skinner (2001).

Milner v Carnival (2010) is another example where customers, in this case Mr and Mrs Milner, who took an extended cruise on the Cunard ship Queen Victoria, had expectations of a benefit which did not materialise and for which damages were sought both for "diminution of value" (the quantifiable difference between the payment made and the value derived) and for "distress and disappointment". Judge Simon Tuckey gave permission for an appeal against the trial ruling on damages, noting that this case "may provide the opportunity to give authoritative guidance on the appropriate measure of damages in 'holiday' cases" where disappointment is an issue.

== Theory ==
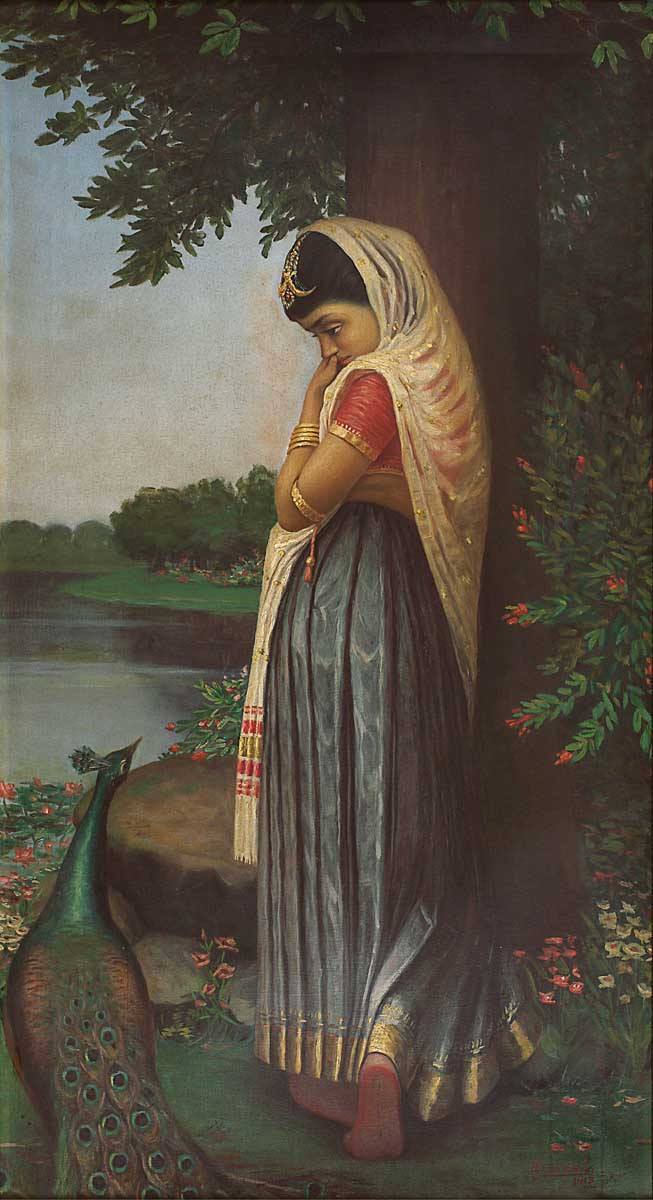
Untitled - Woman with a peacock (1919), by Jogesh Chandra Seal

Disappointment theory, pioneered in the mid-1980s by David E. Bell with further development by Graham Loomes and Robert Sugden, revolves around the notion that people contemplating risks are disappointed when the outcome of the risk is not evaluated as positively as the expected outcome. Disappointment theory has been utilized in examining such diverse decision-making processes as return migration, taxpayer compliance and customer willingness to pay. David Gill and Victoria Prowse have provided experimental evidence that people are disappointment averse when they compete.

Disappointed individuals focus on "upward counterfactuals"—alternative outcomes that would have been better than the one actually experienced—to the point that even positive outcomes may result in disappointment. One example, supplied by Bell, concerns a lottery win of $10,000.00, an event which will theoretically be perceived more positively if that amount represents the highest possible win in the lottery than if it represents the lowest. Decision analysts operate on the assumption that individuals will anticipate the potential for disappointment and make decisions that are less likely to lead to the experience of this feeling. Disappointment aversion has been posited as one explanation for the Allais paradox, a problematic response in expected utility theory wherein people prove more likely to choose a certain reward than to risk a greater reward while at the same time being willing to attempt a greater reward with lower probability when both options include some risk.

While earlier developers of disappointment theory focused on anticipated outcomes, more recent examinations by Philippe Delquié and Alessandra Cillo of INSEAD have focused on the impact of later disappointment resulting when an actual outcome comes to be regarded negatively based on further development; for example, if a person receives higher than expected gains in the stock market, they may be elated until they discover a week later that they could have gained much more profit if they had waited a few more days to sell. This experience of disappointment may influence subsequent behavior, and, the analysts state, an incorporation of such variables into disappointment theory may enhance the study of behavioral finance. Disappointment is, along with regret, measured by direct questioning of respondents.

== See also ==
- Anticipation
- Paris syndrome
- Disenchantment
