= Marex =

Marex may refer to:

== Medicine ==
- Marex, or Terbutaline, used as a "reliever" inhaler in the management of asthma symptoms among other uses

== Companies ==
- Marex (British company) UK-based tech-enabled liquidity hub
  - Sevilleja v Marex Financial Ltd 2020 Supreme Court of the United Kingdom
- Marex telemetry Location-based service (Nasdaq: MRXX)
- Marex, Miami Florida shipwreck recovery company established 1982 Wreck of the Titanic
- MarEx (The Maritime Executive), news service, Florida established 1997
- Marex Petroleum Juan de Nova Island
