= Framfield =

Village in East Sussex, England

Coordinates: 50.96°N 0.13°E

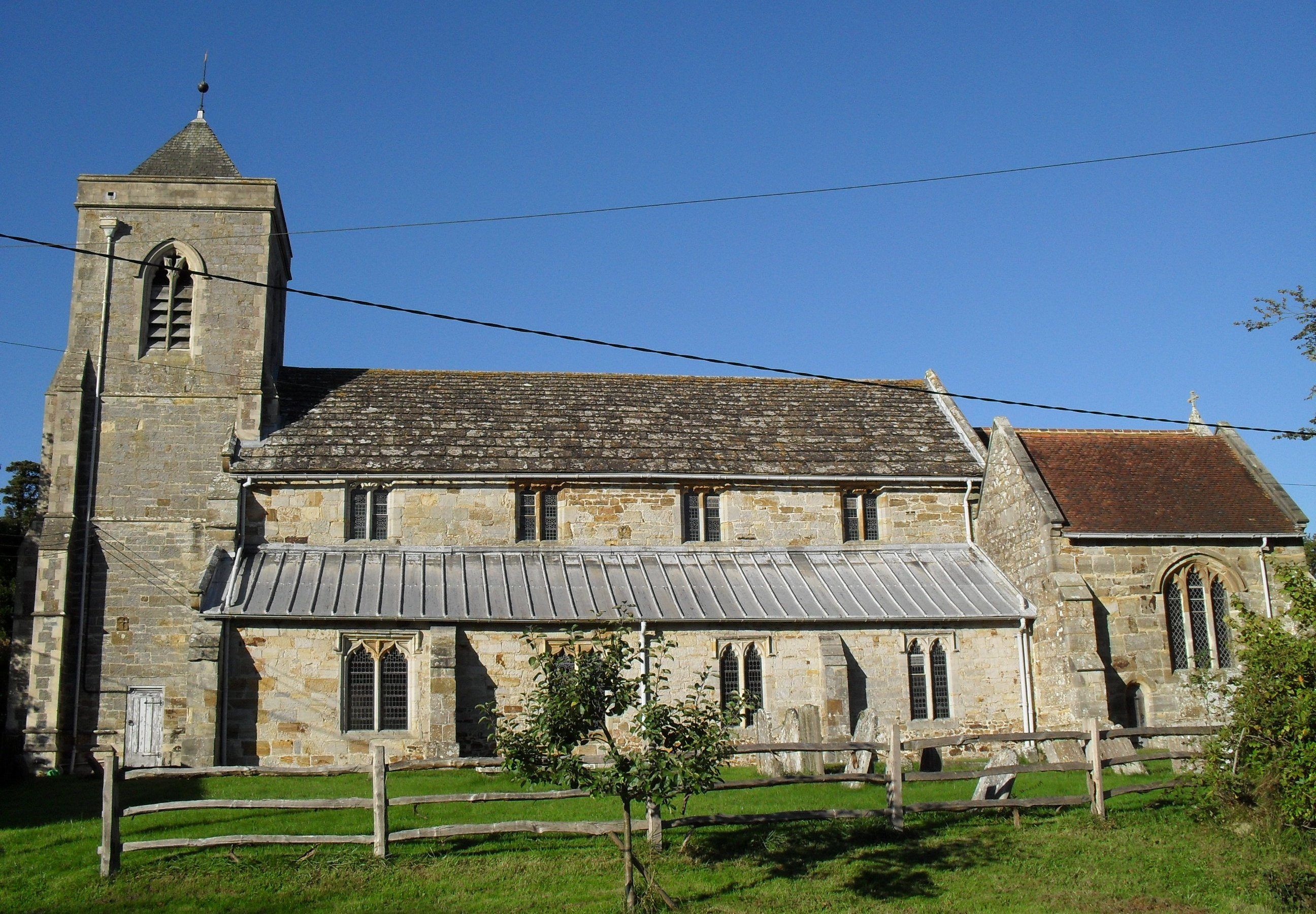
- St Thomas a Becket's Church

- Location within East Sussex
- Area: 19.8 km^{2} (7.6 sq mi)
- Population: 1,983 (2011)
  - Density: 243/sq mi (94/km^{2})
- OS grid reference: TQ494203
  - London: 39 miles (63 km) NNW
- District: Wealden
- Shire county: East Sussex
- Region: South East
- Country: England
- Sovereign state: United Kingdom
- Post town: UCKFIELD
- Postcode district: TN22
- Dialling code: 01825
- Police: Sussex
- Fire: East Sussex
- Ambulance: South East Coast
- UK Parliament: Wealden

Framfield is a village and civil parish in the Wealden district of East Sussex, England. The village is located two miles (3 km) east of Uckfield; the settlements of Blackboys and Palehouse form part of the parish area of 6,700 acres (2,706 ha).

== History ==
It is likely that Framfield came into existence in the 9th century. Saxon invaders established many settlements along the Weald: the final -field in its name means a clearing in the forest to build such a place. The village is mentioned in the Domesday Book (Framelle); part of the church has Norman stonework.

John Levett died holding the manor of Framfield in 1552. He was succeeded by his son Laurence. By 1590 the manor of Framfield, which had been in the Levett family for centuries, came to Bromley and Branthwaite by letters patent in the reign of Queen Elizabeth I. Within several years it was in the hands of Thomas Sackville, Lord Buckhurst and through marriage ultimately came to John Tufton, 2nd Earl of Thanet. Richard Sackville, 5th Earl of Dorset subsequently purchased the manor of Framfield from the Earls Thanet.

== Governance ==
An electoral ward in the same name exists. This ward had a population taken at the 2011 census of 2,741.

== Geography ==
Framfield parish lies on the southern part of the Weald. An ancient trackway, probably used by the Saxons during their invasions, passes to the north of the village. Like many other such places, it was involved in the Wealden iron industry: there are many small streams (including Framfield Stream) which are tributaries of the River Ouse (Sussex) on which the mills stood.

== The Framfield and Blackboys Summer Show ==
Each year in the village, a fête is held at the Framfield recreation ground and memorial hall. It is a big event for Framfield. The summer show is held on the third Saturday of August and includes the traditional vegetable, fruit and flower exhibits along with flower arranging, children's and adult handicrafts, cookery and photographic sections. While overseen by the Framfield and Blackboys Horticultural Society, the summer show organisation has now passed to the local show committee, initially chaired by Phil Day and later by Terry Everitt. The show returned in 2022 after a two year break due to the Covid pandemic.

== Blackboys ==
Blackboys is a local village within the same parish as Framfield. There a number of theories about the source of the name Blackboys. The most interesting theory relates to the ancient industry of charcoal burning.

The Blackboys Inn was founded in the 14th century as a coaching establishment. It is possible that the inn was also founded as an overnight lodge for the drivers transporting charcoal from the local woods to Lewes and other towns. In the 1950s it was owned by the comedian and actor Ronald Shiner.

Riverside House, and its exposure to noise from aircraft operations at Gatwick Airport, was the subject of a House of Lords legal ruling in 2001 (Farley v Skinner).

Located near Blackboys is Tickerage Mill, which was once the home of Vivien Leigh. After her death, her ashes were scattered on the mill pond..

The composer Ruth Gipps lived, in later years, at Tickerage Castle, now a large detached house.

== Religion ==
There is a 13th-century church, dedicated to Thomas Becket, which is thought to have superseded a wooden Saxon one. In the 9th century it passed from the crown to the Archbishop of Canterbury, assuming its nomination as a peculiar. In 1509 a fire burned all the wooden parts of the church. The tower collapsed in the 17th century. In 1891 the church, including the tower, was restored and the bells were rehung.

There is also a Baptist chapel, and there was a Methodist church at Blackboys. However, this has now been converted into houses.

== Education ==
Education is provided by two Church of England primary schools: Framfield and Blackboys.

== Leisure and sport ==
There are two inns in the parish: the Hare and Hounds in Framfield and the Blackboys Inn in Blackboys.

Blackboys Cricket Club is based at the Blackboys recreation ground.

Framfield and Blackboys Football Club is based at Framfield recreation ground, as is AFC Uckfield's youth team.

== Economy ==
The main charcoal business of the parish stopped in the early 19th century when the iron industry moved north to the Midlands with their large deposits of coal.
