= Suzanne Segerstrom =

American clinical psychologist

- Occupations: Professor of Human Development and Family Sciences
- Awards: Templeton Positive Psychology Prize (2002)

Academic background
- Education: Lewis and Clark College; University of California, Los Angeles; University of Kentucky

Suzanne C. Segerstrom is a professor of human development and family sciences at Oregon State University, where she holds the Jo Anne Leonard Petersen Endowed Chair for Gerontology and Family Studies. She is also Professor Emerita of Psychology at the University of Kentucky, where she was a professor from 1997 to 2023. She is known for her clinical research on optimism and pessimism in relation to health, stress, and general well-being.

Segerstrom was the 2002 first prize recipient of the Templeton Positive Psychology Prize for her work "aimed at understanding the processes behind optimistic dispositions and beliefs and, in particular, how these processes relate to the functioning of the immune system". She is Editor-in-chief of Psychosomatic Medicine. She previously served as president of the American Psychosomatic Society. Segerstrom is a Fellow of the Association for Psychological Science.

== Biography ==
Segerstrom was born in Boston, MA and grew up in Oregon. She attended Lewis and Clark College where she received a bachelor's degree in psychology and music in 1990. Segerstrom went on to complete M.A. and Ph.D. degrees in clinical psychology at UCLA (1997), and a clinical internship in psychology at Vancouver Hospital and Health Sciences Center (University of British Columbia). She subsequently earned a M.P.H. degree in biostatistics from the University of Kentucky (2017).

Segerstrom was a professor of psychology at the University of Kentucky from 1997 to 2023, and was named Professor Emerita of Psychology there in July 2023. She joined Oregon State University in June 2023.

At Oregon State University, she is the Jo Anne Leonard Petersen Endowed Chair for Gerontology and Family Studies and directs the Center for Healthy Aging Research.

As a graduate student at UCLA, Segerstrom worked under the supervision of Shelley E. Taylor, Margaret Kemeny, and Michelle Craske. Her dissertation titled "Optimism is associated with mood, coping, and immune change in response to stress" received the American Psychological Association Martin E. P. Seligman Award for Outstanding Dissertation Research on the Science of Optimism and Hope.

Segerstrom's research has been funded by the National Institutes of Health's National Institute on Aging.

== Research ==
Segerstrom's research examines individual differences in cognition, emotion, and personality factors (e.g., dispositional optimism) in relation to psychological well-being, health, and physiological functions (e.g., immune system). This includes studies of the effects of disappointment and emotional approach coping on health. Her collaborative research with Sandra Sephton has explored how law students' expectations for their future affect their immune response, and suggests that optimism yields health benefits, including protection against viral infections. Such findings align with other work indicating that people who have positive attitudes have better health outcomes.

Segerstrom is the author of Breaking Murphy's Law: How Optimists Get What They Want and Pessimists Can Too and the editor of The Oxford Handbook of Psychoneuroimmunology.

== Selected works ==
- Nes, L. S., & Segerstrom, S. C. (2006). Dispositional optimism and coping: A meta-analytic review. Personality and Social Psychology Review, 10(3), 235–251.
- Segerstrom, S. C. (2007). Optimism and resources: Effects on each other and on health over 10 years. Journal of Research in Personality, 41(4), 772–786.
- Segerstrom, S. C., & Miller, G. E. (2004). Psychological stress and the human immune system: A meta-analytic study of 30 years of inquiry. Psychological Bulletin, 130(4), 601–630.
- Segerstrom, S. C., & Nes, L. S. (2007). Heart rate variability reflects self-regulatory strength, effort, and fatigue. Psychological Science, 18(3), 275–281.
- Segerstrom, S. C., Taylor, S. E., Kemeny, M. E., & Fahey, J. L. (1998). Optimism is associated with mood, coping, and immune change in response to stress. Journal of Personality and Social Psychology, 74(6), 1646–1655.
- Segerstrom, S. C., Tsao, J. C., Alden, L. E., & Craske, M. G. (2000). Worry and rumination: Repetitive thought as a concomitant and predictor of negative mood. Cognitive Therapy and Research, 24(6), 671–688.
