= Woodar Investment Development Ltd v Wimpey Construction UK Ltd =

English contract law case

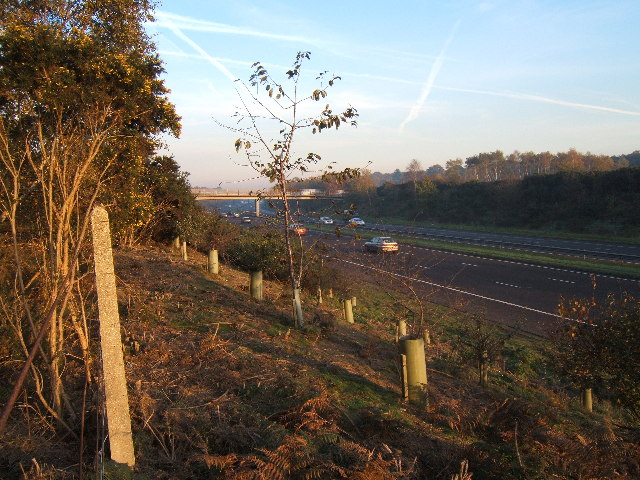
- This contract related to 14 acres of land at Cobham, Surrey. Of importance to the factual decision, the Esher by-pass was built nearby soon afterwards
- Court: House of Lords
- Citations: [1980] 1 WLR 277 [1980] 1 All ER 571, HL(E) [1980] UKHL 11
- Transcript

Case history
- Prior actions: One previous appeal, decided in the alternative on the question of fact, similarly on the question of law

Court membership
- Judges sitting: Lord Wilberforce, Lord Salmon, Lord Russell of Killowen, Lord Keith of Kinkel, Lord Scarman

Case opinions
- Lord Wilberforce

Keywords
- Privity; frustration in contracts for the sale/purchase of land; right to rescind reserved; alleged repudiation.

Woodar Investment Development Ltd v Wimpey Construction UK Ltd [1980] 1 WLR 277 is an English contract law case notable for its pronouncements on the doctrine of privity, since modified by the Contracts (Rights of Third Parties) Act 1999.

== Facts and questions of law ==
Between 1970 and 1973, Wimpey Construction UK Ltd entered into extensive negotiations to purchase 14 acres of land owned by Ronald Cornwall near a proposed motorway bypass near Esher. However, the land was eventually sold by the vendor to Woodar Investment Development Ltd, who in turn entered into a sale contract with Wimpey Ltd for £850,000 (equivalent to £9,200,000 in 2025). As well as to complete the purchase, Wimpey would be obliged to pay a further £150,000 to a third party, Transworld Trade Ltd. (Note: See now, largely superseding statute, Contracts (Rights of Third Parties) Act 1999 s 1(1)(b)) Transworld was a Hong Kong based company linked to the original landowner, Ronald Cornwall.

However, the contract contained several termination clauses, with the relevant clause being that the contract would terminate if the government started compulsory purchase action for this land; and 8 months later, the government gave Woodar formal notice of its intention to compulsory acquire 2.3 acres of the land.

In the following year, in 1974, with a drop in land prices, with the land original purchased for £70,000, Wimpey's solicitors wrote to Woodar informing them that they were rescinding the contract based on the compulsory acquisition clause, but also offering to purchase the land again for the reduced price of £48,000 per acre.

Woodars solicitors' response was to inform them that this was wrongful rescission, as the rescission clause only allowed compulsory acquisition commenced after the date of the contract, pointing out that the government had started the acquisition process before the sale date, including public advertising and holding public meetings on the matter.

Woodar sued for damages and in the High Court it was awarded £462,000 damages, subsequently reduced on appeal by the Court of Appeal to £272,943.

Separately, the claimant, Woodar, argued that Jackson v Horizon Holidays Ltd should be followed, so they could claim the full £1m, passing on the £150,000 element of this, the overage sum envisaged as due directly to a third party by the contract (a non-signatory to the contract).

== Judgment ==
=== Court of Appeal ===
The panel sitting, Buckley, Lawton and Goff LLJ, found no entitlement to terminate and held reluctantly that they were bound by Jackson v Horizon Holidays Ltd into holding that the additional £150,000 could be recovered.

=== House of Lords ===
The Judicial Committee held by a majority (Lords Salmon and Russell dissenting) that there had in fact been no repudiatory breach as Wimpey, as they had calculated, were entitled to rescind following the intervening compulsory purchase affecting the site.

As obiter dicta the Lords discussed where the Court of Appeal was right that if Woodar did have a good claim for breach of contract, they could claim damages on behalf of Transworld Trade Ltd. Lord Wilberforce said that Jackson could be supported on its special facts, as a type of contract including family holidays, ordering meals in restaurants and hiring a taxi for a group. But here "the factual situation [was] quite different". He added:

Whether in a situation such as the present – [namely] where it is not shown that Woodar was agent or trustee for Transworld, or that Woodar itself sustained any loss, Woodar can recover any damages at all, or any but nominal damages, against Wimpey, and on what principle, is, in my opinion, a question of great doubt and difficulty – no doubt open in this House – but one on which I prefer to reserve my opinion.

== Cases cited ==
=== Disapproved for generalised use – distinguished ===
- Jackson v Horizon Holidays Ltd [1975], CA

=== Considered ===
- Federal Commerce & Navigation Co Ltd v Molena Alpha Inc [1979], HL(E)
- Sweet & Maxwell Ltd v Universal News Services Ltd [1964], CA
- Spettabile Consorzio Veneziano di Armamento v Northumberland Shipbuilding Co Ltd (1919), CA
- Shaffer (James) Ltd v Findlay Durham & Brodie [1953], CA

== See also ==
- English contract law
