= Sevilleja v Marex Financial Ltd =

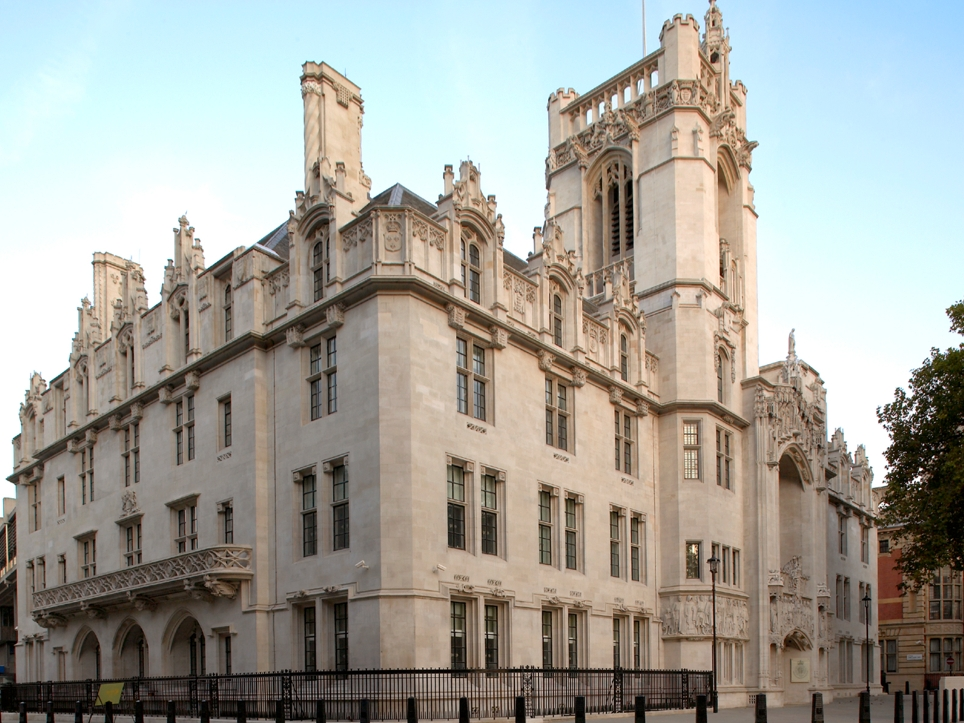
- The Supreme Court
- Court: Supreme Court
- Full case name: Carlos Sevilleja Garcia v Marex Financial Ltd
- Decided: 15 July 2020
- Citation: [2020] UKSC 31
- Transcripts: BAILII; UKSC

Case history
- Appealed from: [2018] EWCA Civ 1468

Court membership
- Judges sitting: Lady Hale; Lord Reed; Lord Hodge; Lady Black; Lord Lloyd-Jones; Lord Kitchin; Lord Sales

Case opinions
- Decision by: Lord Reed (with whom Lady Black, Lord Lloyd-Jones agreed)
- Concurrence: Lord Hodge
- Dissent: Lord Sales (with whom Lady Hale and Lord Kitchin agreed)

Keywords
- reflective loss; fraudulent conveyance; insolvency; rule in Foss v Harbottle

Sevilleja v Marex Financial Ltd [2020] UKSC 31 is a judicial decision of the Supreme Court of the United Kingdom relating to company law and the rule against reflective loss.

The issue which the court had to resolve was whether the creditors of a company could claim against a third party who had asset-stripped the company, or whether their claims were barred by the fact that the company was proper plaintiff under the rule in Foss v Harbottle and thus their claim should be barred as reflective loss. All seven judges agreed that the rule against reflective loss did not apply to creditors and that the claim could proceed.

However "the bulk of the judgment" related to the proper application of the rule against reflective loss. On this issue the court split, 4:3. The minority simply wanted to abolish the rule, but the majority were content to reform the rule, disapproving or overruling various statements which had been made in Johnson v Gore Wood & Co [2002] 2 AC 1 and subsequent cases. In particular the majority held that the subsequent decisions in Giles v Rhind [2003] Ch 618, Perry v Day [2004] EWHC 3372 and Gardner v Parker [2004] EWCA Civ 781 were all wrongly decided.

== Background ==
The rule against reflective loss broadly provides that the proper claimant for a wrong done to a company is the company itself, and that a shareholder does not enjoy a separate cause of action for the diminution in the value of their shares or the failure to receive dividends as a result. The shareholder's loss is merely a "reflection" of the loss suffered by the company itself. However the case law evolved to raise the possibility that the rule against reflective loss should extend more widely, beyond shareholders’ claims to claims by other parties. In Johnson v Gore Wood [2002] 2 AC 1, Lord Millett made some obiter dictum comments that the rule would apply to claims brought by the claimant shareholder in his capacity as employee, rather than his capacity as shareholder. And in Garner v Parker [2004] EWCA Civ 781 Neuberger LJ had stated that it was hard to see why the rule against reflective loss should not also apply to creditors generally. This expansion in the scope of the rule attracted comment and a certain degree of criticism, and the central issue before the Supreme Court was the proper extent of the rule.

== Facts ==
The judgment was given on the basis of a preliminary issue - an application to set aside the granting of leave to serve outside the jurisdiction on the basis that the claim disclosed no sustainable cause of action. Accordingly, for the purposes of the appeal, the court assumed that all of the facts as pleaded by Marex were correct. But the court noted that Mr Sevilleja did in fact dispute those facts.

The assumed facts were as follows: Mr Sevilleja was the owner and controller of two British Virgin Islands companies (called "the Companies" in the decision). The Companies were used as vehicles for foreign exchange trading. Marex obtained a judgment against the Companies for more than US$5.5m for unpaid sums due under those contracts (as well as an award of costs). In those proceedings Field J provided the parties with a confidential draft of his judgment on 19 July 2013, the judgment being officially handed down and orders for payment made on 25 July 2013. But, starting on or shortly after 19 July 2013, Mr Sevilleja procured that more than US$9.5m was transferred offshore from the Companies' accounts and placed under his personal control. By the end of August 2013, the Companies assets were a mere US$4,329.48. The object of the transfers (on the assumed facts) was to ensure that Marex did not receive payment of the amounts owed by the Companies.

The Companies were placed into insolvent voluntary liquidation in the British Virgin Islands by Mr Sevilleja in December 2013, with alleged debts exceeding US$30m owed to Mr Sevilleja and other entities associated with or controlled by him. Marex was the only non-insider creditor. The liquidator was paid a retainer, and was indemnified against his fees and expenses, by an entity controlled by Mr Sevilleja. The company liquidation process has effectively been on hold, and the liquidator has not taken any steps to investigate the Companies' missing funds or to investigate the claims submitted to him, including claims submitted by Marex. Nor had the liquidator issued any proceedings against Mr Sevilleja to trace the funds which were removed.

In related proceedings in New York, the court held described it as "the most blatant effort to hinder, delay and defraud a creditor this Court has ever seen".

== Judgments ==
Mr Sevilleja applied to strike out the claims as disclosing no cause of action because the rule against reflective loss should apply to company creditors as well as company shareholders. In the Court of Appeal he succeeded, in a decision which attracted a great deal of comment. Marex then appealed to the Supreme Court, and the All Party Parliamentary Group on Fair Business Banking were invited to make representations to the court as amicus curiae.

In the Supreme Court three judges gave what were referred to as "dense judgments".

=== Lord Reed ===
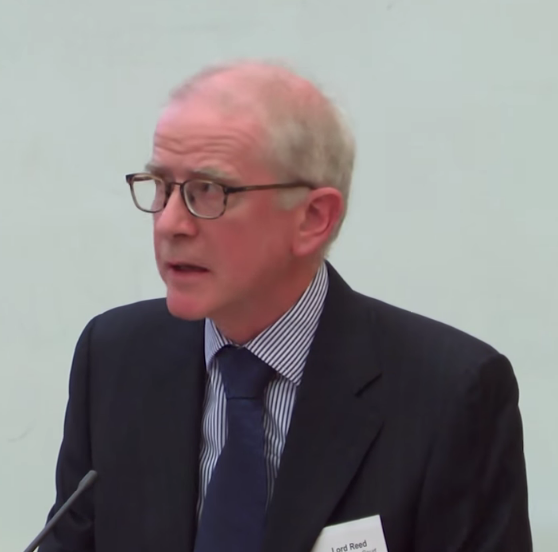
Lord Reed.

Lord Reed gave the leading judgment. In a long and densely written judgment, he summarised the history of the law relating to concurrent claims and the modern development of the rule against reflective loss in Prudential Assurance Co Ltd v Newman Industries Ltd (No 2) [1982] Ch 204. He restated the basic principle that "a claim by the shareholder is barred by the principle of company law known as the rule in Foss v Harbottle (1843) 2 Hare 461: a rule which (put shortly) states that the only person who can seek relief for an injury done to a company, where the company has a cause of action, is the company itself."

He then reviewed the decision in Johnson v Gore Wood & Co, noting that the Supreme Court had been invited to depart from that case and overrule certain decisions which followed it. He frankly acknowledged the difficulties with the case, noting that the "most obvious difficulty with the avoidance of double recovery, as an explanation of the judgment in Prudential, is perhaps its unrealistic assumption that there is a universal and necessary relationship between changes in a company's net assets and changes in its share value. Another serious problem is its inability to explain why the shareholder cannot be permitted to pursue a claim against a wrongdoer where the company has declined to pursue its claim or has settled it at an undervalue, and the risk of double recovery is therefore eliminated in whole or in part." But he noted that the rule had been followed and applied in Australia, the Cayman Islands, Ireland, Jersey and Singapore.

Lord Reed then distinguished between (1) cases where claims are brought by a shareholder in respect of loss that was suffered in that capacity (i.e. a diminution in share value or in distributions which is caused by loss sustained by the company, in respect of which the company has a cause of action against the same wrongdoer), and (2) cases where claims are brought by a shareholder (or by anyone else) in respect of loss which does not fall within that description, but where the company has a concurrent right of action in respect of substantially the same loss. Actions in respect of the losses which fall under (2) therefore, are distinct and separate from a company's loss. He then summarily dismissed the situation of creditors as being entirely different to shareholders (which was sufficient to deal with the main issue between the parties.

Lord Reed accordingly affirmed the approach taken by the Court of Appeal in Prudential, but concluded that the same did not apply in the current case as: "The rule in Prudential is limited to claims by shareholders that, as a result of actionable loss suffered by their company, the value of their shares, or of the distributions they receive as shareholders, has been diminished. Other claims, whether by shareholders or anyone else, should be dealt with in the ordinary way." He concluded: "It follows that Giles v Rhind, Perry v Day and Gardner v Parker were wrongly decided.

=== Lord Hodge ===
Lord Hodge noted that the court was unanimous that the appeal should be allowed, but that "there is a division of view as to whether a shareholder can recover damages for the diminution in value of its shareholding in a company or for the loss of distributions which the company would have paid to it in circumstances where a wrong has been done both to the company and to the shareholder". He expressed his support for the majority, that the rule against reflective loss should continue (albeit in modified form) for shareholders, but not creditors. He then undertook a careful exposition of the nature of a shareholder's interest in a limited liability company, and the nature of the rights that a share confers in and against a company, and concluded that as a matter of principle the rule against reflective loss should continue to apply to shareholders.

It may well be, as Lord Sales reasons, that the law can achieve some protection of those interests by other means such as case management and equitable subrogation. But the creation of a bright line legal rule, as the Court of Appeal did in the Prudential case, is principled. That judgment has stood for almost 39 years; it was upheld by the House of Lords in Johnson v Gore Wood & Co [2002] 2 AC 1; and it has been adopted in other common law countries. We should not depart from it now.

=== Lord Sales ===
Lord Sales indicated that he agreed with the outcome of the majority's decision, but dissented with the reasons for their decision, stating: "I have come to the same conclusion as Lord Reed and the majority that Marex's appeal should be allowed. But my reasoning differs from theirs." Lady Hale and Lord Kitchin supported his dissent, splitting the court 4:3 on the relevant issues. In essence, Lord Sales (and the judges who joined with him) thought that the rule against reflective loss should simply be abolished entirely. He felt that concerns about double recovery and concurrent claims could be dealt with effectively through case management.

He expressed the view that "the reasoning in Johnson, in so far as it endorses the reflective loss principle as a principle debarring shareholders from recovery of personal loss which is different from the loss suffered by the company, ought not to be followed." As a matter of principal he expressed the view that it was wrong for "a bright line rule to be introduced in the common law as a matter of policy to preclude what are otherwise, according to ordinary common law principles, valid causes of action" and that the rule "gives undue priority to the interests of other shareholders and creditors of the company in circumstances where the claimant shareholder is not subject to any obligation to subordinate his interest in vindicating his personal rights to their interests"

== Reception ==
=== Academic Journals ===
The case was reviewed in the Modern Law Review by Jonathan Hardman, who broadly supported the decision but argued "the majority judgment did not go far enough."

In the Law Quarterly Review the case was reviewed by Professor Andrew Tettenborn, who praised the decision effusively, saying the outcome "it is submitted, is something to be welcomed. It enormously simplifies the law of obligations; furthermore, the position it adopts is both doctrinally correct and rational in outcome."

=== Practitioners ===
The decision has received broad support and is recognised as a fundamentally important one for company law. One commentator noted that "The importance of the decision cannot be overstated."

Another commentator noted: "There can be no doubt that this will have an important impact in practice", adding: "The Judgment makes clear that if a principle of reflective loss does exist, it is narrowly confined to shareholder claims – whether automatically in each case in which a shareholder and a company have a concurrent and reflective claim against the same third party, as per Lord Reed and Lord Hodge – or whether determined according to the specific loss suffered by the shareholder in the particular circumstances, as per Lord Sales."

Other commentators expressed greater sympathy with the minority position, but accepted that "for the time being at least, the doctrine of reflective loss lives to fight another day, but in truncated form."
