= Jarvis v Swans Tours Ltd =

English contract law case

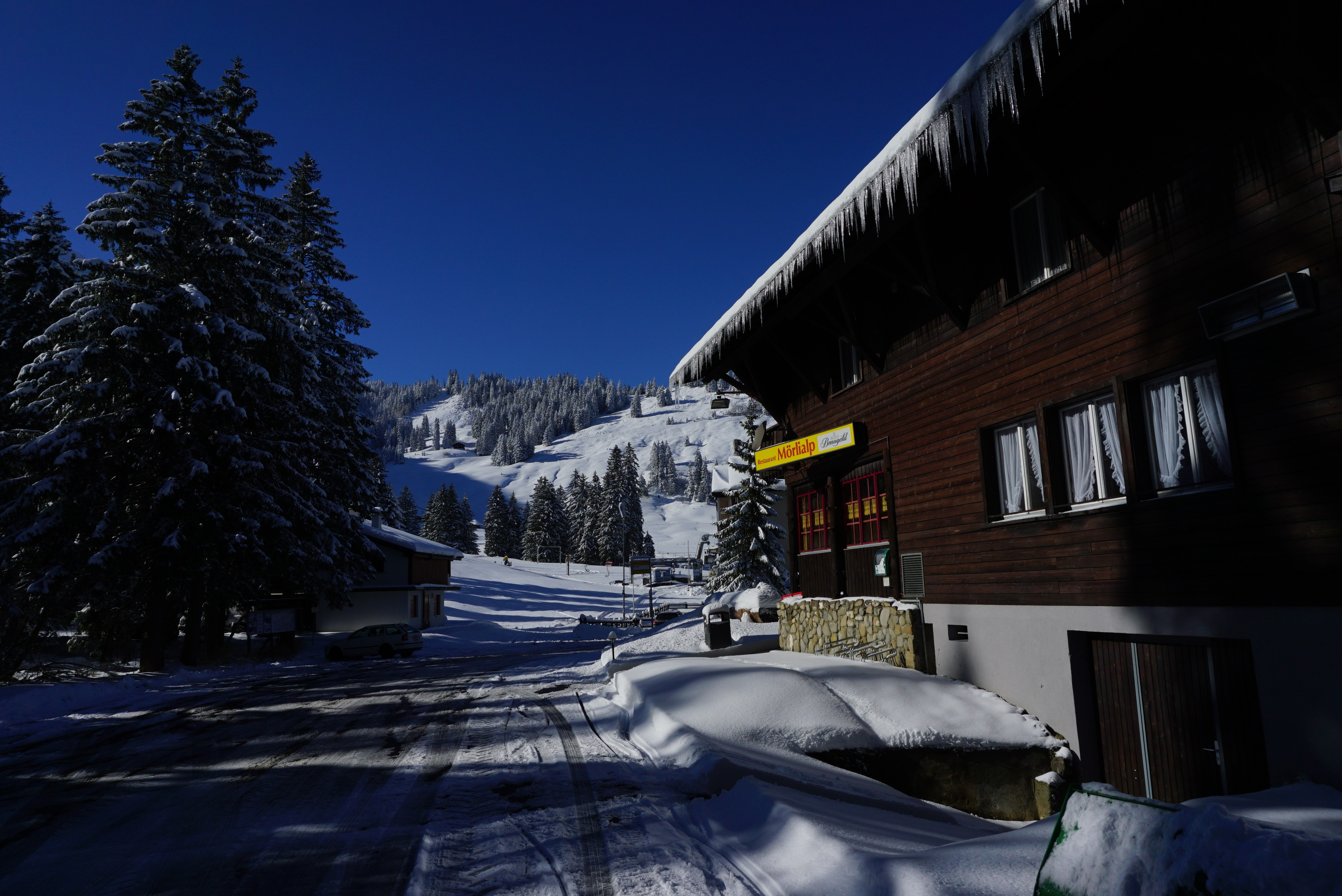
- Ski resort Mörlialp
- Court: Court of Appeal
- Citations: [1972] EWCA Civ 8, [1973] QB 233; [1973] 1 All ER 71
- Transcript: Full text of judgment on Bailii

Case opinions
- Lord Denning MR, Edmund Davies LJ and Stephenson LJ

Keywords
- Non pecuniary damages

Jarvis v Swans Tours Ltd [1972] EWCA 8 is an English contract law case on the measure of damages for disappointing breaches of contract.

== Facts ==
Mr. Jarvis was a solicitor for Barking Council. He chose to go for a Christmas holiday to Switzerland. The brochure from Swan Tours Ltd advertising a holiday in Mörlialp, Giswil described the attractions as follows:

House Party Centre with special resident host. ... Mörlialp is a most wonderful little resort on a sunny plateau ... Up there you will find yourself in the midst of beautiful alpine scenery, which in winter becomes a wonderland of sun, snow and ice, with a wide variety of fine ski-runs, a skating rink and exhilarating toboggan run ... Why did we choose the Hotel Krone ... mainly and most of all because of the 'Gemütlichkeit' and friendly welcome you will receive from Herr and Frau Weibel. ... The Hotel Krone has its own Alphütte Bar which will be open several evenings a week. ... No doubt you will be in for a great time, when you book this houseparty holiday ... Mr. Weibel, the charming owner, speaks English.

In a yellow highlighted box it added:

Swans House Party in Mörlialp. All these House Party arrangements are included in the price of your holiday. Welcome party on arrival. Afternoon tea and cake for 7 days. Swiss dinner by candlelight. Fondue party. Yodeler evening. Chali farewell party in the 'Alphütte Bar'. Service of representative.

It also stated, "Hire of Skis, Sticks and Boots ... Ski Tuition ... 12 days £11.10." Mr Jarvis booked 15 days with a ski pack in August 1969 for £63.45, including a Christmas supplement. He found that the "house party" was only 13 people in the first week and none in the second week. Mr Weibel could not speak English. The judge, Lord Denning MR said:

So there was Mr. Jarvis, in the second week, in this hotel with no house party at all, and no one could speak English, except himself. He was very disappointed, too, with the ski-ing. It was some distance away at Giswil. There were no ordinary length skis. There were only mini-skis, about 3 ft. long. So he did not get his ski-ing as he wanted to. In the second week he did get some longer skis for a couple of days, but then, because of the boots, his feet got rubbed and he could not continue even with the long skis. So his ski-ing holiday, from his point of view, was pretty well ruined.

There were also no Swiss cakes, just crisps and little dry nut cakes. The "yodeler" was a local man who came in work clothes and sang four or five songs quickly. The "Alphütte Bar" was empty and only open one evening.

Mr Jarvis sued for breach of contract. The trial judge awarded £31.72, as the difference between the value paid and the value of the service received (half of what was paid for). Mr Jarvis appealed for more.

== Judgment ==
Lord Denning MR held that Mr Jarvis could recover damages for the cost of his holiday, but also damages for "disappointment, the distress, the upset and frustration caused by the breach." He said old limitations on damages for distress and disappointment are "out of date". Accordingly, £125 was awarded.

What is the legal position? I think that the statements in the brochure were representations or warranties. The breaches of them give Mr. Jarvis a right to damages. It is not necessary to decide whether they were representations or warranties: because since the Misrepresentation Act 1967, there is a remedy in damages for misrepresentation as well as for breach of warranty.

The one question in the case is: What is the amount of damages? The judge seems to have taken the difference in value between what he paid for and what he got. He said that he intended to give "the difference between the two values and no other damages" under any other head. He thought that Mr. Jarvis had got half of what he paid for. So the judge gave him half the amount which he had paid, namely, £31.72. Mr. Jarvis appeals to this court. He says that the damages ought to have been much more.

There is one point I must mention first. Counsel together made a very good note of the judge's judgment. They agreed it. It is very clear and intelligible. It shows plainly enough the ground of the judge's decision: but, by an oversight, it was not submitted to the judge, as it should have been: see Bruen v. Bruce (Practice Note) [1959] 1 WLR 684. In some circumstances we should send it back to the judge for his comments. But I do not think we need do so here. The judge received the notice of appeal and made notes for our consideration. I do not think he would have wished to add to them. We will, therefore, decide the case on the material before us.

What is the right way of assessing damages? It has often been said that on a breach of contract damages cannot be given for mental distress. Thus in Hamlin v. Great Northern Railway Co. (1856) 1 H.& N 408, 411 Pollock C.B. said that damages cannot be given "for the disappointment of mind occasioned by the breach of contract." and in Hobbs v. London & South Western Railway Co. (1875) LR 10 QB 111, 122, Mellor J. said that

for the mere inconvenience, such as annoyance and loss of temper, or vexation, or for being disappointed in a particular thing which you have set your mind upon, without real physical inconvenience resulting, you cannot recover damages.

The courts in those days only allowed the plaintiff to recover damages if he suffered physical inconvenience, such as having to walk five miles home, as in Hobbs' case; or to live in an over-crowded house, Bailey v. Bullock [1950] 2 All ER 1167.

I think that those limitations are out of date. In a proper case damages for mental distress can be recovered in contract, just as damages for shock can be recovered in tort. One such case is a contract for a holiday, or any other contract to provide entertainment and enjoyment. If the contracting party breaks his contract, damages can be given for the disappointment, the distress, the upset and frustration caused by the breach. I know that it is difficult to assess in terms of money, but it is no more difficult than the assessment which the courts have to make every day in personal injury cases for loss of amenities. Take the present case. Mr. Jarvis has only a fortnight's holiday in the year. He books it far ahead, and looks forward to it all that time. He ought to be compensated for the loss of it.

A good illustration was given by Edmund Davies L.J. in the course of the argument. He put the case of a man who has taken a ticket for Glyndebourne. It is the only night on which he can get there. He hires a car to take him. The car does not turn up. His damages are not limited to the mere cost of the ticket. He is entitled to general damages for the disappointment he has suffered and the loss of the entertainment which he should have had. Here, Mr. Jarvis's fortnight's winter holiday has been a grave disappointment. It is true that he was conveyed to Switzerland and back and had meals and bed in the hotel. But that is not what he went for. He went to enjoy himself with all the facilities which the defendants said he would have. He is entitled to damages for the lack of those facilities, and for his loss of enjoyment.

A similar case occurred in 1951. It was Stedman v. Swan's Tours (1951) 95 SJ 727. A holiday-maker was awarded damages because he did not get the bedroom and the accommodation which he was promised. The county court judge awarded him £13.15. This court increased it to £50.

I think the judge was in error in taking the sum paid for the holiday £63.45 and halving it. The right measure of damages is to compensate him for the loss of entertainment and enjoyment which he was promised, and which he did not get.

Looking at the matter quite broadly, I think the damages in this case should be the sum of £125. I would allow the appeal, accordingly.

Edmund Davies, Baron Edmund-Davies|Edmund Davies LJ and Stephenson LJ concurred.

== Commentary ==
Jarvis v Swans Tours Ltd has been called "the Donoghue v Stevenson of Tourism Law".

== See also ==
- Measure of damages in English law
- Addis v Gramophone Co Ltd [1909] AC 488
- Jackson v Horizon Holidays Ltd [1975] 3 All ER 92
- Farley v Skinner [2001] UKHL 49
