= Reflective loss =

In United Kingdom company law, reflective loss is the loss of individual shareholders that is inseparable from general loss of the company. The rule against recovery of reflective loss states that there should be no double recovery, so a shareholder can only bring a derivative action for losses of the company, and may not allege suffering a loss in a personal capacity for a personal right.

Where a company suffers loss caused by a breach of duty owed to it, only the company may sue in respect of that loss. No action lies at the suit of a shareholder suing in that capacity and no other to make good a diminution in the value of the shareholder's shareholding where that merely reflects the loss suffered by the company.
— Lord Bingham of Cornhill, Johnson v Gore Wood & Co [2002] 2 AC 1 at 19.

Reflective loss extends beyond the diminution of the value of the shares; it extends to the loss of dividends (specifically mentioned in Prudential Assurance v Newman Industries Ltd) and all other payments which the shareholder might have obtained from the company if it had not been deprived of its funds. All transactions or putative transactions between the company and its shareholders must be disregarded.

In Sevilleja v Marex Financial Ltd [2020] UKSC 31 the Supreme Court of the United Kingdom restricted (but declined to abolish) the doctrine, but disapproved many of the statements made previously in Johnson v Gore Wood & Co, describing Lord Millet's speech in particular as a "wrong turn". Commentators have indicated of the decision is Sevilleja: "The importance of the decision cannot be overstated."

== Legal development ==
- Prudential Assurance v Newman Industries Ltd [1982] Ch 204
- Johnson v Gore Wood & Co [2002] 2 AC 1
- Giles v Rhind [2002] EWCA Civ 1428
- Gardner v Parker [2004] 2 BCLC 554
- Sevilleja v Marex Financial Ltd [2020] UKSC 31

== See also ==
- United Kingdom company law
- Derivative action
