= Jackson v Horizon Holidays Ltd =

English contract law case concerning the doctrine of privity

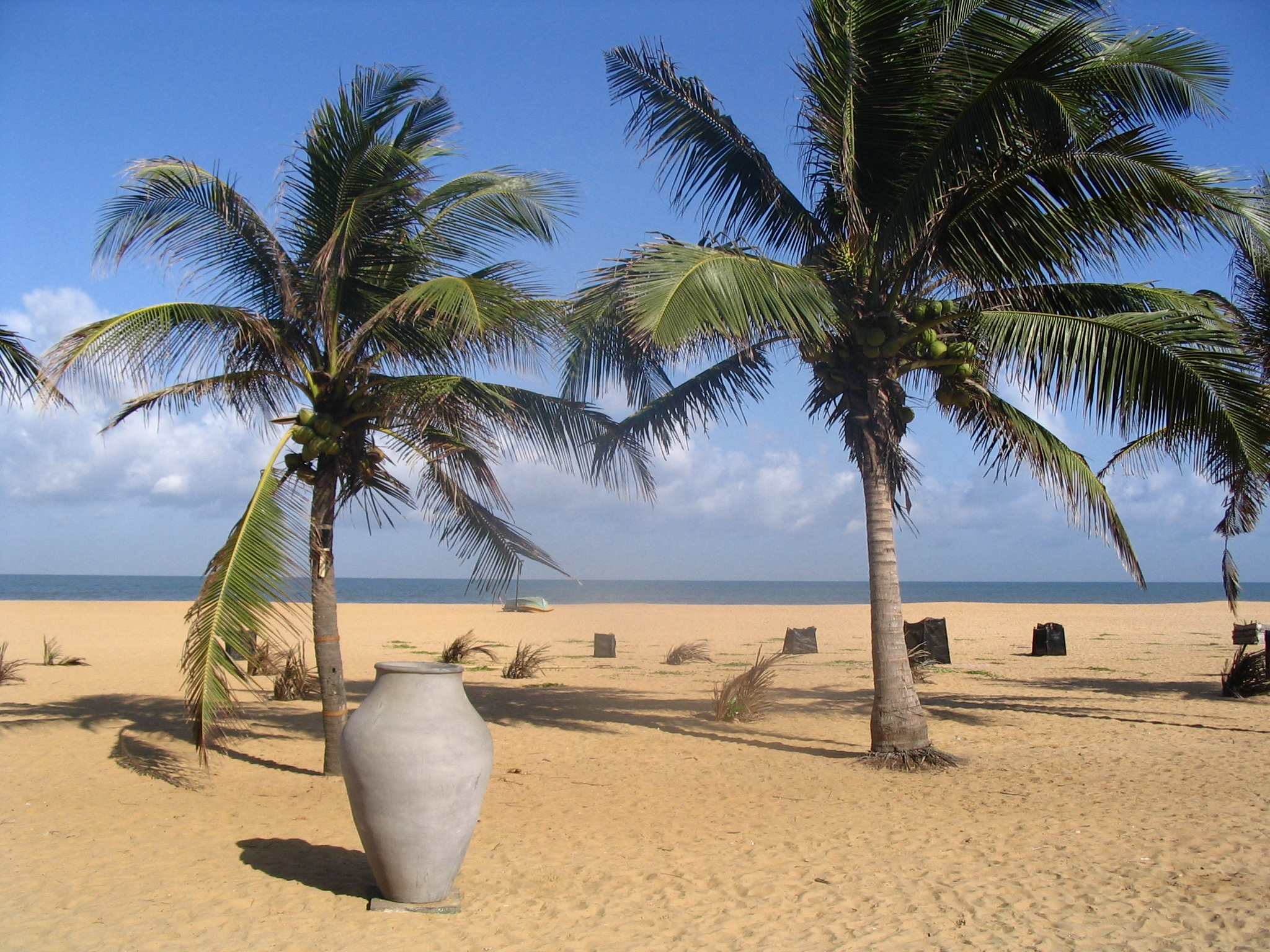
- Court: Court of Appeal of England and Wales
- Full case name: Anthony Jackson v Horizon Holidays Ltd
- Decided: February 5, 1974
- Citations: [1974] EWCA Civ 12, [1975] 1 WLR 1468

Court membership
- Judges sitting: Lord Denning MR, James LJ and Orr LJ

Keywords
- Privity

Jackson v Horizon Holidays Ltd [1975] 1 WLR 1468 is an English contract law case, concerning the doctrine of Privity. The case would now be partly resolved by the Contracts (Rights of Third Parties) Act 1999 section 1(1)(b), allowing a third party to claim independently. Some of the reasoning of Lord Denning MR was disapproved in Woodar Investment Development Ltd v Wimpey Construction UK Ltd, which held that the decision is limited to a confined category of cases involving consumers.

== Facts ==
Mr Jackson got a holiday through Horizon Holidays Ltd to the Brown Beach Hotel, Hendala Point, in Ceylon (now Sri Lanka) for himself and his family. He paid £1200. When they arrived, the facilities were substandard, and not at all as promised. As Lord Denning MR recounted,

they were greatly disappointed. Their room had not got a connecting door with the room for the children at all. The room for the children was mildewed - black with mildew, at the bottom. There was fungus growing on the walls. The toilet was stained. The shower was dirty. There was no bath. They could not let the children sleep in it. So for the first three days they had all the family in one room. The two children were put into one of the single beds and the two adults in the other single bed. After the first three days they were moved into what was said to be one of the best suites in the hotel. Even then, they had to put the children in to sleep in the sitting room and the parents in the bedroom. There was dirty linen upon the bed. There was no private bath but only a shower; no mini-golf course; no swimming pool, no beauty saloon, no hairdressers' saloon. Worst of all was the cooking. There was no choice of dishes. On some occasions, however, curry was served as an alternative to the main dish. They found the food very distasteful. It appeared to be cooked in coconut oil. There was a pervasive taste because of its manner of cooking. They were so uncomfortable at Brown's Hotel, that after a fortnight they moved to the Pegasus Reef Hotel.

The judge followed Jarvis v Swans Tours Ltd and awarded damages of £1100 for distress. The defendant appealed against the damages awarded to Mr Jackson's wife and children, who were not parties to the contract.

== Judgment ==
Lord Denning MR held that Mr Jackson could recover damages of £600 for defective performance and £500 for disappointment or ‘mental distress’ for himself and his family.

It would be a fiction to say that the contract was made by all the family… and that he was only an agent for them. Take this very case. It would be absurd to say that the twins of three years old were parties to the contract or that the father was making the contract on their behalf as if they were principals.’ Or trust, and the truth was that he was making a contract for their benefit. He quoted Lush LJ in Lloyd’s v Harper (1880) 16 ChD 290, 321 and said that although there were suggestions that he meant you can sue for a disappointed benefit to a third party if you are a trustee, he ‘did not think so… I think they should be accepted as correct, at any rate so long as the law forbids the third persons themselves from suing for damages. It is the only way in which a just result can be achieved.’ [Otherwise] ‘is no one to recover from them except the one who made the contract for their benefit? He should be able to recover the expense to which he has been put, and pay it over to them. Once recovered it will money had and received to their use.

Lord Denning MR also held that the family might even, if desired, be joined as plaintiffs, that the initial award of £1100 was ‘about right’, and opined that other instances where a good claim may exist include a vicar contracting for a coach trip for the choir and a host booking a restaurant dinner for himself and his friends.

James LJ and Orr LJ concurred with Denning LJ's judgement, without adding further comments.

== See also ==
- English contract law
