= Johnson v Gore Wood & Co =

- Court: House of Lords
- Full case name: Johnson v Gore Wood & Co
- Decided: 14 December 2000
- Citations: [2002] 2 A.C. 1; [2001] 1 All E.R. 481; [2001] 2 W.L.R. 72; [2000] UKHL 65

Case history
- Appealed from: [2004] EWCA Civ 14 [2003] EWCA Civ 1728

Court membership
- Judges sitting: Lord Bingham of Cornhill; Lord Goff of Chieveley; Lord Cooke of Thorndon; Lord Hutton; Lord Millett

Keywords
- abuse of process; res judicata; estoppel by convention; reflective loss

Johnson v Gore Wood & Co [2000] UKHL 65 is a leading UK company law decision of the House of Lords concerning (1) abuse of process relating to litigating issues which have already been determined in prior litigation or by way of settlement, (2) estoppel by convention, and (3) reflective loss of a shareholder with respect to damage which was done to the company in which he holds shares.

== Facts ==
Mr Johnson was a director and majority shareholder in a number of companies, including Westway Homes Limited (referred to in the judgment as "WWH"). Gore Wood & Co were a firm of solicitors who acted for the companies and also occasionally for Mr Johnson in his personal capacity. In 1998 Gore Wood were acting for WWH and served notice under an option to acquire land from a third party upon the solicitors for that third party. The third party alleged that this was not proper service, and refused to convey the land. Legal proceedings ensued and ultimately WWH succeeded. However, because the third party was impecunious and funded by legal aid WWH was unable to recoup the full amount of its losses and legal costs. Accordingly, WWH issued proceedings against Gore Wood for professional negligence alleging, broadly, that their losses would have been averted entirely if Gore Wood had properly served the original notice on the third party instead of on the third party's solicitors.

Gore Wood ultimately settled those claims, and the settlement agreement included two provisions which were later to prove important. Firstly, it included a clause stating that any amount which Mr Johnson wished subsequently to claim against Gore Wood in his personal capacity would be limited to £250,000 excluding interest and costs. Secondly, the confidentiality clause contained an except which permitted the settlement agreement to be referred to in any action which Mr Johnson might bring against Gore Wood.

Mr Johnson then subsequently issued proceedings against Gore Wood in his personal name, and Gore Wood made applications to strike out some or all of the claims on the basis that (i) it was an abuse of process to seek to relitigate issues which had already been compromised in the settlement agreement, and (ii) some or all of the claims which Mr Johnson was making were for losses sustained by WWH, and his personal claims should be disallowed as reflective loss.

At first instance Mr Johnson succeeded, as Pumfrey J in the High Court held that Gore Wood was estopped by convention from contending that the claims were an abuse of process as both parties had tacitly agreed that such claims could be brought when they entered into the settlement agreement. The Court of Appeal held that there was no estoppel by convention, and that the proceedings were an abuse under the rule in Henderson v Henderson (1843) 3 Hare 100. The Court of Appeal held that just one of Mr Johnson's claims should be struck out for reflective loss.

== Judgment ==
The leading judgment was given by Lord Bingham, although all five Law Lords gave speeches of varying lengths.

=== Abuse of process ===
Their Lordships considered at some length previous decisions of the English courts in relation to abuse of process, and stressing that the courts strive to find a balance between proper administration of justice and avoiding defendants being vexed by duplicative litigation, and the need to ensure that persons with a proper claim were able to have those claims heard and determined. The court stressed that what was known as "the rule in Henderson v Henderson" had now actually evolved a very long way from the original judgment after which it was named. The rule against abuse of process was similar to rule relating to cause of action estoppel (or res judicata) and issue estoppel, but they were not the same. However both were concerned with the same underlying public interest. The court was reluctant to set down hard and fast rules as to what would amount to abuse of process when claims which might conveniently have been brought at an earlier were only made at a later time. Courts need to be mindful not to confuse the fact that a litigant could have brought his claims at an earlier stage with the proposition that he should have done so. Only in the latter case would it be an abuse of process to subsequently litigate those claims.

In this case Mr Johnson had given a number of reasons why he did not pursue his personal claims at an earlier time, including impecuniosity, the availability of legal aid, and personal circumstances. The court indicated that impecuniosity was not normally a good ground, although in this case the impecuniosity was alleged to have been caused by the defendant. The court also noted that Mr Johnson had from a very early stage made clear his intention of bringing a personal claim separate from the claim of WWH. Taken as a whole their Lordships was satisfied that there was no abuse, although they declined to lay down a definitive test. Their Lordships felt that the courts should take a broad, merit-based approach to account for the public and private interests involved (including a citizen's right of access to the court).

=== Estoppel by convention ===
The House of Lords felt that the point relating to estoppel by convention (i.e. that the parties had contemplated such further action might be brought in the earlier settlement agreement) was tied up in the issue of abuse of process. They noted that the litigation between Mr Johnson and Gore Wood had been ongoing for nearly four and half years before the defendant firm of solicitors sought to strike out the claims on this basis, which was reflective of the parties common understanding that those claims might be pursued, and during that time pleadings had been considerably advanced and they had even made a payment into court. Their Lordships determined that the key issues was whether (i) the settlement of WWH's action proceeded on the basis of an underlying assumption that Mr Johnson would be bringing further claims, and (ii) whether it would be unfair or unjust to now allow Gore Wood to go back on that assumption. Their Lordships held that both grounds were made out.

=== Reflective loss ===
In relation to the issue of reflective loss, Lord Bingham summarised the existing case law in three key propositions:

1. Where a company suffers loss caused by a breach of duty owed to it, only the company may sue in respect of that loss. No action lies at the suit of a shareholder suing in that capacity and no other to make good a diminution in the value of the shareholder's shareholding where that merely reflects the loss suffered by the company.
2. Where a company suffers loss but has no cause of action to sue to recover that loss, the shareholder in the company may sue in respect of it.
3. Where a company suffers loss caused by a breach of duty to it, and a shareholder suffers a loss separate and distinct from that suffered by the company caused by breach of a duty independently owed to the shareholder, each may sue to recover the loss caused to it by breach of the duty owed to it but neither may recover loss caused to the other by breach of the duty owed to that other.

Applying these tests, the House of Lords held that one of Mr Johnson's claimed heads of loss should be struck-out (diminution in the value of his shareholding in WWH, and amounts which WWH would otherwise have paid into his pension), and the remaining claims were allowed to proceed (these included the cost of personal borrowing by Mr Johnson to fund his outgoings and those of his business, the value of shares lost when the bank foreclosed upon security which he provided, and additional tax liability). The court held that the claims for cost of borrowing would need to be scrutinised carefully at trial to ensure that they were not merely claims for lost dividends (which were not allowable) in disguise. The court also allowed a claim for losses on other investments which Mr Johnson made based upon advice from Gore Wood. The court also struck out claims for mental distress and aggravated damages on other grounds. The rule against reflective loss is justified by the need both to prevent double recovery and to provide protection for the company's creditors, who might be prejudiced if the shareholder's claim were to succeed.

== See also ==
- Abuse of process
